= List of International Congresses of Mathematicians Plenary and Invited Speakers =

This is a list of International Congresses of Mathematicians Plenary and Invited Speakers. Being invited to talk at an International Congress of Mathematicians has been called "the equivalent, in this community, of an induction to a hall of fame." The current list of Plenary and Invited Speakers presented here is based on the ICM's post-WWII terminology, in which the one-hour speakers in the morning sessions are called "Plenary Speakers" and the other speakers (in the afternoon sessions) whose talks are included in the ICM published proceedings are called "Invited Speakers". In the pre-WW II congresses the Plenary Speakers were called "Invited Speakers".

== Overview ==
- During the 1900 Congress in Paris, France, David Hilbert announced his famous list of Hilbert's problems.
- At the 1954 Congress of Mathematicians in Amsterdam, Richard Brauer announced his program for the classification of finite simple groups.
- Alexander Grothendieck in his plenary lecture at the 1958 Congress outlined his programme "to create arithmetic geometry via a (new) reformulation of algebraic geometry, seeking maximal generality."
- At the 1962 Congress in Stockholm Kiyosi Itô lectured on how to combine differential geometry and stochastic analysis, and this led to major advances in the 60s and 70s.

== Speakers ==
=== 1897, Zürich ===
- Jules Andrade
- Léon Autonne
- Émile Borel
- Francesco Brioschi
- Hermann Brunn
- Nikolai Bugaev
- Cesare Burali-Forti
- Charles Jean de la Vallée Poussin
- Gustaf Eneström
- Federigo Enriques
- Gino Fano
- Zoel García de Galdeano
- Francesco Gerbaldi
- Paul Gordan
- Jacques Hadamard
- Adolf Hurwitz
- Felix Klein
- Gino Loria
- Wilhelm Franz Meyer
- Giuseppe Peano
- Ivan Pervushin
- Émile Picard
- Salvatore Pincherle
- Henri Poincaré
- Gusztáv Rados
- Karl Reuschle
- Theodor Reye
- Ernst Schröder
- Cyparissos Stephanos
- Ludwig Stickelberger
- Aurel Stodola
- H. Weber
- Hieronymus Georg Zeuthen
- Nikolay Yegorovich Zhukovsky

=== 1900, Paris ===
- Federico Amodeo
- Léon Autonne
- Ivar Otto Bendixson
- Jean Boccardi
- Émile Borel
- Moritz Cantor
- Alfredo Capelli
- Élie Cartan
- Zoel García de Galdeano
- Leonard Eugene Dickson
- Philbert Maurice d'Ocagne
- Jules Drach
- Erik Ivar Fredholm
- Rikitaro Fujisawa
- Ángel Gallardo
- Jacques Hadamard
- Harris Hancock
- David Hilbert
- Pierre Adolphe Issaly
- Eugen Jahnke
- Victor Jamet
- Helge von Koch
- Léopold Leau
- Edgar Odell Lovett
- Alexander Macfarlane
- Edmond Maillet
- Artemas Martin
- Charles Méray
- Gösta Mittag-Leffler
- Henri Padé
- Alessandro Padoa
- Raoul Perrin
- Henri Poincaré
- Cyparissos Stephanos
- Irving Stringham
- G. K. Suslov
- Matvej Tichomandrickij
- F. J. Vaes
- Giuseppe Veronese
- Vito Volterra

=== 1904, Heidelberg ===
- Jules Andrade
- Léon Autonne
- Émile Borel
- Anton Börsch
- Pierre Boutroux
- Anton von Braunmühl
- Alexander von Brill
- Max Brückner
- Moritz Cantor
- Alfredo Capelli
- Nikolai Delaunay
- Samuel Dickstein
- Gustaf Eneström
- Henri Fehr
- Johannes Finsterbusch
- Sebastian Finsterwalder
- Robert Fricke
- Robert William Genese
- Paul Gordan
- Alfred George Greenhill
- Claude Guichard
- Alf Victor Guldberg
- August Gutzmer
- Jacques Hadamard
- David Hilbert
- Franc Hočevar
- Alfred Kempe
- Felix Klein
- Johannes Knoblauch
- Gyula Kőnig (Julius König)
- Leo Königsberger
- Tullio Levi-Civita
- Reinhold von Lilienthal
- Alfred Loewy
- Gino Loria
- Francis Sowerby Macaulay
- Wilhelm Franz Meyer
- Hermann Minkowski
- Gösta Mittag-Leffler
- Emil Müller
- Paul Painlevé
- Ludwig Prandtl
- Karl Rohn
- Georg Scheffers
- Ludwig Schlesinger
- Arthur Moritz Schoenflies
- Heinrich Schotten
- Corrado Segre
- Maximilian Simon
- Arnold Sommerfeld
- Antonín Václav Šourek
- Paul Stäckel
- Cyparissos Stéphanos
- Eduard Study
- Heinrich Suter
- Paul Tannery
- Hermann Thieme
- Giovanni Vailati
- Vito Volterra
- Georgy Voronoy
- Heinrich Martin Weber
- Julius Weingarten
- Hermann Wiener
- Ernest Julius Wilczynski
- Edwin Bidwell Wilson
- Anders Wiman
- Wilhelm Wirtinger
- Hieronymus Georg Zeuthen
- Konrad Zindler

=== 1908, Rome ===
- Max Abraham
- Federico Amodeo
- Jules Andrade
- Friedrich Simon Archenhold
- Léon Autonne
- Giuseppe Bagnera
- Emanuel Beke
- Felix Bernstein
- Luigi Bianchi
- Giovanni Boccardi
- Tommaso Boggio
- Georg Bohlmann
- Émile Borel
- Pierre Boutroux
- L. E. J. Brouwer
- Max Brückner
- George H. Bryan
- Silvio Canevazzi
- Alfredo Capelli
- Giuseppe Casazza
- it:Alberto Conti
- Robert d'Adhémar
- Gaston Darboux
- George Darwin
- Miles Menander Dawson
- Michele de Franchis
- Zoel García de Galdeano
- Fernando de Helguero
- Robert de Montessus de Ballore
- Leonard Eugene Dickson
- Friedrich Dingeldey
- Maurice d'Ocagne
- Pierre Duhem
- Walther von Dyck
- William Palin Elderton
- Arnold Emch
- Federigo Enriques
- Henri Fehr
- Thomas Claxton Fidler
- Johannes Finsterbusch
- Andrew Forsyth
- Giovanni Frattini
- Ivar Fredholm
- Guido Fubini
- Generoso Gallucci
- Antonio Garbasso
- Robert William Genese
- Raffaele Giacomelli
- Corrado Gini
- Paul Gordan
- George Greenhill
- August Gutzmer
- Jacques Hadamard
- Gerhard Hessenberg
- Gregorius Itelson
- Paul Koebe
- G. V. Kolosoff
- Arthur Korn
- Traian Lalesco
- Horace Lamb
- Giuseppe Lauricella
- Charles Lembourg
- Beppo Levi
- Tullio Levi-Civita
- Hendrik Lorentz
- Gino Loria
- Luigi Luiggi
- Alexander Macfarlane
- Lucien March
- Roberto Marcolongo
- Gösta Mittag-Leffler
- Domenico Montesano
- E. H. Moore
- Simon Newcomb
- Onorato Nicoletti
- Max Noether
- Luciano Orlando
- Marino Pannelli
- Ernesto Pascal
- Annibale Pastore
- Mihailo Petrović
- Georgii Pfeiffer
- Émile Picard
- Georg Pick
- Salvatore Pincherle
- Laura Pisati
- Giulio Pittarelli
- Paolo Pizzetti
- Henri Poincaré
- John Henry Poynting
- Giuseppe Pucciano
- Albert Quiquet
- Gusztáv Rados
- Georges Rémoundos
- Frigyes Riesz
- Nikolai Saltykow
- Ludwig Schlesinger
- Corrado Segre
- Francesco Severi
- Carlo Severini
- Maximilian Simon
- David Eugene Smith
- Carlo Somigliana
- Arnold Sommerfeld
- Cyparissos Stéphanos
- Carl Størmer
- Richard Suppantschitsch
- George F. Swain
- Orazio Tedone
- Guido Toja
- Gheorghe Tzitzéica
- Giovanni Vailati
- Vladimir Varićak
- Giuseppe Veronese
- Vito Volterra
- William Henry Young
- Stanisław Zaremba
- Ernst Zermelo
- Panagiotis Zervos
- Hieronymus Georg Zeuthen

=== 1912, Cambridge (UK) ===
- Max Abraham
- Luigi Amoroso
- Harry Bateman
- Hans Albrecht von Beckh-Widmanstetter
- Geoffrey Thomas Bennett
- Sergei Natanovich Bernstein
- Wilhelm Blaschke
- Otto Blumenthal
- Maxime Bôcher
- Enrico Bompiani
- Émile Borel
- Selig Brodetsky
- Thomas John I'Anson Bromwich
- L. E. J. Brouwer
- Ernest William Brown
- Max Brückner
- George Edward St. Lawrence Carson
- Henry Louis Le Châtelier
- Alfred Denizot
- John Dougall
- Jules Drach
- Walther von Dyck
- Francis Ysidro Edgeworth
- Luther P. Eisenhart
- Edwin Bailey Elliott
- Gustaf Eneström
- Federigo Enriques
- Paul Peter Ewald
- Henri Fehr
- John Charles Fields
- Johannes Finsterbusch
- Ludwig Föppl
- André Gérardin
- Marcel Grossmann
- Jacques Hadamard
- Johann Georg Hagen
- Percy John Harding
- G. H. Hardy
- Nikolaos J. Hatzidakis
- Micaiah John Muller Hill
- Bohuslav Hostinský
- Hilda Phoebe Hudson
- Edward Vermilye Huntington
- Gregorius Itelson
- Zygmunt Janiszewski
- Philip Jourdain
- Theodore von Kármán
- Edward Kasner
- Helge von Koch
- Dénes Kőnig
- József Kürschák
- Horace Lamb
- Edmund Landau
- Joseph Larmor
- Robert Alfred Lehfeldt
- Armin Otto Leuschner
- John Edensor Littlewood
- Gino Loria
- Augustus Edward Hough Love
- Alexander Macfarlane
- E. H. Moore
- Frank Morley
- Forest Ray Moulton
- Robert Franklin Muirhead
- Eric Harold Neville
- Thomas Percy Nunn
- Alessandro Padoa
- Giuseppe Peano
- William Peddie
- Johannes Hendrikus Peek
- Mihailo Petrovitch
- Albert Quiquet
- Georges Rémoundos
- Ferdinand Rudio
- Carl David Tolmé Runge
- Nikolai Saltykow
- Ralph Allen Sampson
- Ludwig Schlesinger
- Pieter Hendrik Schoute
- William Fleetwood Sheppard
- Ludwik Silberstein
- David Eugene Smith
- Marian Smoluchowski
- Carlo Somigliana
- Duncan Sommerville
- Johan Frederik Steffensen
- Cyparissos Stéphanos
- Robert von Sterneck
- Eduard Study
- Richard Suppantschitsch
- Esteban Terrades
- J. J. Thomson
- Herbert Hall Turner
- Gheorghe Tzitzéica
- Giovanni Vacca
- Vito Volterra
- Roland Weitzenböck
- Alfred North Whitehead
- E. T. Whittaker
- Michael Marlow Umfreville Wilkinson
- Ernst Zermelo
- Panagiotis Zervos

=== 1920, Strasbourg ===
- Johan Antony Barrau
- Farid Boulad Bey
- Jean Boccardi
- Pierre Boutroux
- Louis Marcel Brillouin
- Henri Brocard
- Bohumil Bydzowsky
- Élie Cartan
- Albert Châtelet
- Francisco Miranda da Costa Lobo
- Percy John Daniell
- Théophile de Donder
- Charles Jean de la Vallée-Poussin
- Arnaud Denjoy
- Jacques Deruyts
- Leonard Eugene Dickson
- Maurice d'Ocagne
- Jules Drach
- L. Gustave du Pasquier
- Luther P. Eisenhart
- Rudolf Fueter
- André Gérardin
- Alfred George Greenhill
- Marcel Grossmann
- Édouard Guillaume
- Alf Victor Guldberg
- Jacques Hadamard
- Nikolaos J. Hatzidakis
- Bohuslav Hostinský
- Camille Jordan
- Gabriel Koenigs
- Joseph Larmor
- Solomon Lefschetz
- Louis Maillard
- Niels Erik Nørlund
- Kinnosuke Ogura
- František Rádl
- Georges Rémoundos
- Julio Rey Pastor
- Dimitri Riabouchinsky
- Nilos Sakellariou
- Émile Schwoerer
- Jan Sobotka
- Simion Stoilow
- Carl Størmer
- Teiji Takagi
- Alfred Ungerer
- Georges Valiron
- Henri Louis Vanderlinden
- Theodoros Varopoulos
- Vito Volterra
- Joseph Leonard Walsh
- Rolin Wavre
- Pierre Weiss
- Norbert Wiener
- William Henry Young
- Stanisław Zaremba
- Panagiotis Zervos

=== 1924, Toronto ===
- Jules Andrade
- Robert W. Angus
- R. W. Bailey
- Johan Antony Barrau
- Louis Agricola Bauer
- Eric Temple Bell
- Benjamin Abram Bernstein
- Abram Besicovitch
- Richard Birkeland
- Vilhelm Bjerknes
- Gilbert Ames Bliss
- Tommy Bonnesen
- Ettore Bortolotti
- Arthur Lyon Bowley
- Louis Charles Breguet
- Lyman James Briggs
- Léon Brillouin
- Ernest William Brown
- Daniel Buchanan
- Bohumil Bydzovsky
- Florian Cajori
- George Ashley Campbell
- John Renshaw Carson
- Élie Cartan
- Sydney Chapman
- Prosper Charbonnier
- Jean Chazy
- Robert H. Coats
- Arthur Byron Coble
- B. M. Coïalowitsch
- Ernest George Coker
- Arthur W. Conway
- Patrick Peter Cormack
- Francisco Miranda da Costa Lobo
- Louis Jacques Crelier
- Louise Duffield Cummings
- David Raymond Curtiss
- Haroutune Mugurditch Dadourian
- Boris Delaunay
- Alphonse Demoulin
- Leonard Eugene Dickson
- Alfred Cardew Dixon
- Jules Drach
- L. Gustave du Pasquier
- Herbert Bristol Dwight
- Arthur Eddington
- John Arndt Eiesland
- William Palin Elderton
- Alfred Errera
- Griffith Conrad Evans
- Henri Fehr
- Grigorii Fichtenholz
- John Charles Fields
- Ronald Fisher
- Arthur Percy Morris Fleming
- Walter Burton Ford
- R. M. Foster
- Ralph H. Fowler
- Maurice Fréchet
- Thornton Carle Fry
- Guido Fubini
- Rudolf Fueter
- William Frederick Gerhardt
- Giuseppe Gianfranceschi
- Albert Henry Stewart Gillson
- Corrado Gini
- Giovanni Giorgi
- Oliver Edmunds Glenn
- James Waterman Glover
- Lucien Godeaux
- James Gordon Gray
- Alfred George Greenhill
- Jules Haag
- Bernard Parker Haigh
- Mellen Woodman Haskell
- Olive Clio Hazlett
- Nicholas Hunter Heck
- Earle Raymond Hedrick
- James Blacklock Henderson
- Robert Henderson
- Einar Hille
- G. W. O. Howe
- William Jackson Humphreys
- F. R. W. Hunt
- John Irwin Hutchinson
- Samuel Jacob Jacobsohn
- Maurice Janet
- Charles Frewen Jenkin
- Miloš Kössler
- Willem Kapteyn
- Louis Charles Karpinski
- Arthur Edwin Kennelly
- Cassius Jackson Keyser
- Louis Vessot King
- Gabriel Koenigs
- Alfred Korzybski
- Vladimir Aleksandrovich Kostitzin
- Mikhail Kravchuk
- Nikolay Mitrofanovich Krylov
- Joseph Larmor
- Jean-Marie Le Roux
- Horace Clifford Levinson
- Cristóbal de Losada y Puga
- Murdoch Campbell MacLean
- Percy Alexander MacMahon
- Lucien March
- George Francis McEwen
- Émile Merlin
- George Abram Miller
- Edward C. Molina
- Frank Morley
- Francis Dominic Murnaghan
- Forrest Hamilton Murray
- Øystein Ore
- Charles Algernon Parsons
- John Patterson
- Giuseppe Peano
- Mihailo Petrovitch
- Lars Edvard Phragmén
- James P. Pierpont
- Salvatore Pincherle
- Michel Plancherel
- Henry Crozier Plummer
- Jean-Baptiste Pomey
- Gorakh Prasad
- Umberto Puppini
- C. V. Raman
- Andrea Razmadze
- Lowell J. Reed
- Gregorio Ricci-Curbastro
- Paul Reece Rider
- Henry Louis Rietz
- René Risser
- Joseph Fels Ritt
- William Henry Roever
- James Harvey Rogers
- Thomas Reeve Rosebrugh
- Charles Edward St. John
- Axel Frey Samsioe
- Pio Scatizzi
- Clément Servais
- Francesco Severi
- Napier Shaw
- William Fleetwood Sheppard
- James Alexander Shohat
- Wacław Sierpiński
- Ludwik Silberstein
- Chester Snow
- Carl Størmer
- Johan Frederik Steffensen
- Vladimir Steklov
- Charles Thompson Sullivan
- William Francis Gray Swann
- John Lighton Synge
- Jacob Tamarkin
- D'Arcy Wentworth Thompson
- Leonida Tonelli
- Jacques Touchard
- Gheorghe Tzitzéica
- J. V. Uspensky
- Willem van der Woude
- Henri Louis Vanderlinden
- Harry Schultz Vandiver
- Theodoros Varopoulos
- John Alexander Low Waddell
- James Henry Weaver
- A. Harry Wheeler
- Albert Wurts Whitney
- Raymond Louis Wilder
- Thomas Russell Wilkins
- Walter Francis Willcox
- William Lloyd Garrison Williams
- Edwin Bidwell Wilson
- Hugh Herbert Wolfenden
- Julius Wolff
- William Henry Young
- George Udny Yule
- Stanisław Zaremba

=== 1928, Bologna ===
- Nicholas Wladimir Akimoff
- Giacomo Albanese
- Giuseppe Albenga
- Pavel Alexandrov
- Luigi Amoroso
- Dániel Arany
- Raymond Clare Archibald
- Emilio Artom
- José Babini
- Richard Baldus
- Stefan Banach
- Paul Jean Joseph Barbarin
- Nina Bary
- Sergei Natanovich Bernstein
- Ludwig Berwald
- Cornelis Benjamin Biezeno
- Anton Bilimovič
- George David Birkhoff
- Juan Blaquier
- Wilhelm Blaschke
- André Blondel
- Harald Bohr
- Enrico Bompiani
- Tommy Bonnesen
- Émile Borel
- Enea Bortolotti
- Ettore Bortolotti
- Farid Boulad Bey
- Max Brückner
- Louis Marcel Brillouin
- Ugo Broggi
- Thomas John I'Anson Bromwich
- Daniel Buchanan
- Adolphe Buhl
- Pietro Burgatti
- Bohumil Bydzowsky
- Angelina Cabras
- Renato Caccioppoli
- Giacomo Candido
- Francesco Paolo Cantelli
- Élie Cartan
- Giuseppe Casazza
- Ugo Cassina
- Guido Castelnuovo
- Ettore Cavalli
- Eduard Čech
- Jean Chazy
- Salvatore Cherubino
- P'ei-Yuan Chou
- Leon Chwistek
- Louis Crelier
- Stephan Cohn-Vossen
- Richard Courant
- Georges Darmois
- Boris Delaunay
- Bruno de Finetti
- Béla Kerékjártó
- Paul Clément Delens
- Alfred Denizot
- Alfred Cardew Dixon
- Wilhelm Dobbernack
- Jules Drach
- L. Gustave du Pasquier
- Karel Dusl
- Arnold Emch
- Federigo Enriques
- Gino Fano
- Luigi Fantappiè
- John Charles Fields
- Ronald Fisher
- Paul Flamant
- Maurice Fréchet
- Abraham Fraenkel
- Guido Fubini
- Rudolf Fueter
- André Gérardin
- Harald Geppert
- Giuseppe Gianfranceschi
- Oliver Edmunds Glenn
- Lucien Godeaux
- Stanisław Gołąb
- Ferdinand Gonseth
- Aleksander Grużewski
- Alf Victor Guldberg
- Emil Julius Gumbel
- Nikolai Günther
- Alfréd Haar
- Jacques Hadamard
- Hasso Härlen
- Karl-Gustaf Hagstroem
- Mellen Woodman Haskell
- Nikolaos J. Hatzidakis
- Olive Hazlett
- Poul Heegaard
- Heinrich Hencky
- David Hilbert
- Václav Hlavatý
- Bohuslav Hostinský
- William Hovgaard
- Pierre Humbert
- Károly Jordan
- Christian Juel
- Gaston Maurice Julia
- Gustave Juvet
- Theodore von Kármán
- Gottfried Köthe
- Stefan Kaczmarz
- Sōichi Kakeya
- Joseph Kampé de Fériet
- Jovan Karamata
- Louis Charles Karpinski
- Edward Kasner
- Bronislaw Knaster
- Paul Koebe
- G. V. Kolosoff
- Mikhail Kravchuk
- Nikolay Mitrofanovich Krylov
- Rodion Kuzmin
- Paul Pierre Lévy
- Joseph Larmor
- Mikhail Lavrentieff
- Franciszek Leja
- Marcello Lelli
- Josef Lennertz
- Jean-Marie Le Roux
- Tullio Levi-Civita
- Harry Levy
- Hans Lewy
- Leon Lichtenstein
- Antonio Loperfido
- Gino Loria
- Jan Łukasiewicz
- Nicolas Lusin
- Lazar Aronovich Lusternik
- Giorgina Madia
- Gian Antonio Maggi
- Szolem Mandelbrojt
- Lucien March
- Roberto Marcolongo
- Arturo Maroni
- Pierre Massé
- Stefan Mazurkiewicz
- Albert Joseph McConnell
- Birger Meidell
- Ernst Meissner
- Karl Menger
- Dmitrii Menshov
- Paul Mentré
- Augustin Mesnage
- Wilhelm Franz Meyer
- Gaspare Mignosi
- L. M. Milne-Thomson
- Edward Charles Molina
- Johannes Mollerup
- Louis J. Mordell
- Francis D. Murnaghan
- Pekka Juhana Myrberg
- Trygve Nagell
- Pia Nalli
- Otto E. Neugebauer
- Rolf Nevanlinna
- Jerzy Neyman
- Władysław Nikliborc
- Otto M. Nikodym
- Vittorio Nobile
- Emmy Noether
- Niels Erik Norlund
- Nikola Obrechkoff
- Octav Onicescu
- Øystein Ore
- Alessandro Padoa
- C. Papaioannou
- Nikolai Nikolaevich Parfentiev
- Mario Pascal
- Oskar Perron
- Mihailo Petrovitch
- Georgii Pfeiffer
- Mauro Picone
- Salvatore Pincherle
- Enrico Pistolesi
- Michel Plancherel
- George Arthur Plimpton
- George Pólya
- Kyrille Popoff
- Constantin C. Popovici
- Umberto Puppini
- Gorakh Prasad
- Albert Quiquet
- Tibor Radó
- Hans Rademacher
- George Yuri Rainich
- Kurt Reidemeister
- Julio Rey Pastor
- Dimitri Riabouchinsky
- Frigyes Riesz
- René Risser
- Vsevolod Ivanovich Romanovsky
- Alfred Rosenblatt
- Alberto E. Sagastume Berra
- Nilos Sakellariou
- Stanislaw Saks
- Gustavo Sannia
- Giovanni Sansone
- Francesco Sbrana
- Gerrit Schaake
- Emil Schoenbaum
- Jan Arnoldus Schouten
- Beniamino Segre
- Francesco Severi
- Filippo Sibirani
- Wacław Sierpiński
- Louis Lazarus Silverman
- Charles Herschel Sisam
- Eugen Slutsky
- James John Smith
- Alexander Smurov
- Virgil Snyder
- Carlo Somigliana
- Andreas Speiser
- Luigi Stabilini
- Hugo Steinhaus
- Alexander William Stern
- Simion Stoilow
- Ellis Bagley Stouffer
- Paolo Straneo
- Giulio Supino
- Richard Suppantschitsch
- Otto Szász
- Ralph Tambs Lyche
- Alfred Tarski
- Alessandro Terracini
- Gerhard Thomsen
- Georges César Tiercy
- Stephen Timoshenko
- it:Sebastiano Timpanaro
- Leonida Tonelli
- Antonio Torroja i Miret
- Francesco Tricomi
- Herbert Westren Turnbull
- Friedrich Maria Urban
- R. Vaidyanathaswamy
- Georges Valiron
- Henri Louis Vanderlinden
- Vladimir Varićak
- Oswald Veblen
- Quido Vetter
- Tirukkannapuram Vijayaraghavan
- Giuseppe Vitali
- Otto Volk
- Vito Volterra
- Jacob Evert de Vos van Steenwijk
- Gheorghe Vranceanu
- Alwin Walther
- Gleb Wataghin
- Rolin Wavre
- Alexander Weinstein
- Hermann Weyl
- E. T. Whittaker
- Sven Dag Wicksell
- Dorothy Wrinch
- William Henry Young
- Oscar Zariski
- Panagiotis Zervos
- Ziauddin Ahmad
- Rihard Zupančič
- Antoni Zygmund
- Eustachy Żyliński

=== 1932, Zürich ===
- Lars Valerian Ahlfors
- M. Akimoff
- James Waddell Alexander
- P. Alexandroff
- Franz Alt
- Luigi Amoroso
- Arschanikoff
- Radu Bădescu
- Séverin Bays
- Giuseppe Belardinelli
- C. Belhôte
- Maurits Joost Belinfante
- Stefan Bergman
- Paul Bernays
- Sergei Bernstein
- Ludwig Berwald
- Ludwig Bieberbach
- Mieczysław Biernacki
- Antoine Bilimovitch
- Karl Bögel
- Nicolas Bogoliúboff
- Harald Bohr
- Karol Borsuk
- Farid Boulad Bey
- Heinrich Brandt
- Adolphe Buhl
- Giacomo Candido
- Constantin Carathéodry
- Torsten Carleman
- Sauveur Carrus
- Élie Cartan
- Henri Cartan
- Mary Lucy Cartwright
- Giuseppe Casazza
- Wilhelm Cauer
- Eduard Čech
- Georges Cerf
- Lamberto Cesari
- Ljubomir Chakaloff
- Marie Charpentier
- Jules Chuard
- Silvio Cinquini
- James Andrew Clarkson
- Annibale Comessatti
- Arthur William Conway
- Elizabeth Buchanan Cowley
- Hubert Cremer
- Umberto Crudeli
- Louise Duffield Cummings
- Karl Dürr
- Robert d'Adhémar
- Francisco Miranda da Costa Lobo
- David van Dantzig
- Georges de Rham
- Adolfo Del Chiaro
- Paul Delens
- Jean Delsarte
- Basile Demtchenko
- L. Des Lauriers
- Max Deuring
- Jacques Devisme
- Odette Mongeaud-Devisme
- Lloyd Lyne Dines
- Pierre Dive
- Gustav Doetsch
- Jules Drach
- Paul Drumaux
- L. Gustave du Pasquier
- Samuel Dumas
- Karel Dusl
- Alfred Errera
- A. Establier
- Luigi Fantappiè
- Henri Fehr
- Lucien Féraud
- Bruno Finzi
- Jonas Fjeldstad
- Alfred Leon Foster
- Adolf Fraenkel
- Rudolf Fueter
- Godofredo Garcia
- Harald Geppert
- André Gérardin
- Giovanni Giambelli
- Giovanni Giorgi
- Oliver Edmunds Glenn
- Lucien Godeaux
- Stanislaw Golab
- Karl Goldziher
- Ferdinand Gonseth
- Édouard Guillaume
- Alf Victor Guldberg
- N. Gunther
- Max Gut
- Jules Haag
- Jacques Hadamard
- Hans Ludwig Hamburger
- Georg Hamel
- G. H. Hardy
- Helmut Hasse
- Nikolaos J. Hatzidakis
- Arend Heyting
- Einar Hille
- Nikolaus Hofreiter
- Temple Rice Hollcroft
- Heinz Hopf
- Zdeněk Horák
- Hans Hornich
- Gustav Hössjer
- Bohuslav Hostinský
- Witold Hurewicz
- fr:Édouard Husson
- Filadelfo Insolera
- Alexandre Ivanoff
- Maurice Janet
- Wenceslas S. Jardetzky
- Vojtěch Jarník
- Børge Jessen
- Ingebrigt Johansson
- Gaston Julia
- Gustave Juvet
- László Kalmár
- Joseph Kampé de Fériet
- Jovan Karamata
- Edward Kasner
- Boris Kaufmann
- Alfred Kienast
- Ludwig Friedrich Wilhelm August Kiepert
- Bronislaw Knaster
- Ervand Kogbetliantz
- Ernst Kolman
- Arthur Korn
- Gottfried Köthe
- M. Kourensky
- Giulio Krall
- Mikhail Kravchuk
- H. Krebs
- Wolfgang Krull
- Nikolay Mitrofanovich Krylov
- Casimir Kuratowski
- L. Laboccetta
- J. Le Roux
- Franciszek Leja
- Josef Lense
- Paul Lévy
- Edward Hubert Linfoot
- John Edensor Littlewood
- M. Long
- Gino Loria
- Irmgard Lotz
- Kurt Mahler
- Wilhelm Erwin Otto Maier
- Lucien Malavard
- Szolem Mandelbrojt
- A. Marchand
- Karl Menger
- Paul Mentré
- A. Meyer-Jaccoud
- Henri Milloux
- L. M. Milne-Thomson
- Yukio Mimura
- Silvio Minetti
- Richard von Mises
- Edward Charles Molina
- Charles Napoleon Moore
- Louis J. Mordell
- Marston Morse
- Christian Moser
- Ali Moustafa Mosharafa
- Otto Mühlendyck
- Wilhelm Müller
- Chaim Herman Müntz
- Trygve Nagell
- Rolf Nevanlinna
- Eric Harold Neville
- Miron Nicolesco
- Emmy Noether
- Øystein Ore
- Raymond Edward Alan Christopher Paley
- C.P. Papaïoannou
- Wolfgang Pauli
- Joseph Pérès
- Hans Petersson
- Mihailo Petrovitch
- Georgii Pfeiffer
- Sophie Piccard
- Mauro Picone
- Rózsa Politzer
- Hilda Pollaczek-Geiringer
- Lev Pontrjagin
- Kyrille Popoff
- Rodolphe Nicolas Raclis
- H. Rafael
- George Yuri Rainich
- Franz Rellich
- Arnold Reymond
- Dimitri Riabouchinsky
- Carlo Luigi Ricci
- Giovanni Ricci
- Paul Riebesell
- Frédéric Riesz
- René Risser
- Vsevolod Romanovsky
- Alfred Rosenblatt
- Charles Henry Rowe
- Edgar Bonsak Schieldrop
- Hermann Schlichting
- Harry Schmidt
- Jan Arnoldus Schouten
- Günther Schulz
- Herbert Seifert
- Petre Sergescu
- Francesco Severi
- Wacław Sierpiński
- David Eugene Smith
- J.J. Smith
- Virgil Snyder
- Andreas Speiser
- Julius Stenzel
- Wolfgang Sternberg
- Carl Størmer
- Ellis Bagley Stouffer
- Paolo Straneo
- Karl Strubecker
- John Lighton Synge
- Jacob David Tamarkin
- Gerhard Thomsen
- William Threlfall
- Georges Tiercy
- Leonida Tonelli
- Angelo Tonolo
- Francesco Tricomi
- L. Tschakaloff
- S. Tschapligin
- N. Tschebotaröw
- Georges Tzitzéica
- Stanislaw Ulam
- Egon Ullrich
- Georges Valiron
- Quido Vetter
- Paul Félix Vincensini
- Tullio Viola
- Enrico Volterra
- Gheorghe Vrânceanu
- G. N. Watson
- Rolin Wavre
- Ernst August Weiss
- Rudolf Weyrich
- J. H. C. Whitehead
- Norbert Wiener
- Witold Wilkosz
- C.E. Winn
- Julius Wolff
- Dorothy Wrinch
- Alexander Wundheiler
- Stanisław Zaremba
- Marie Zervos
- Antoni Zygmund

=== 1936, Oslo ===
- Leifur Ásgeirsson
- Lars Valerian Ahlfors
- Franz Alt
- Raymond Clare Archibald
- Radu Bădescu
- Stefan Banach
- Dan Barbilian
- Isaac Albert Barnett
- Harry Bateman
- Heinrich Adolph Behnke
- Harald Bergström
- George David Birkhoff
- Garrett Birkhoff
- Vilhelm Bjerknes
- Wilhelm Blaschke
- Carl Böhm
- Émile Borel
- Karol Borsuk
- Farid Boulad Bey
- Arthur Lyon Bowley
- Marcel Brelot
- Hendrik Bremekamp
- Viggo Brun
- Johann Jakob Burckhardt
- Bohumil Bydžovský
- Élie Cartan
- Mary Lucy Cartwright
- Jean Cavaillès
- Arthur William Conway
- Arthur Herbert Copeland
- Johannes van der Corput
- Richard Courant
- Harald Cramér
- David van Dantzig
- Jules Drach
- Paul Drumaux
- Karel Dusl
- Samuel Eilenberg
- Paul Erdős
- Alfred Errera
- Robert Arthur Fairthorne
- Willy Feller
- Werner Fenchel
- Paul Flamant
- Maurice Fréchet
- Hans Freudenthal
- Ragnar Frisch
- Otto Frostman
- Rudolf Fueter
- Fujiwara Matsusaburo
- Solomon Gandz
- Alexander Gelfond
- Harald Geppert
- Joseph E. Gillis
- Wallace Givens
- Lucien Godeaux
- Stanislaw Golab
- Rolf Harald Gran Olsson
- Emil Julius Gumbel
- Max Gut
- Johannes Haantjes
- Gerhard Haenzel
- Georg Hamel
- Douglas Rayner Hartree
- Helmut Hasse
- Erich Hecke
- Poul Heegaard
- Kurt August Hirsch
- Václav Hlavatý
- Nikolaus Hofreiter
- Zdeněk Horák
- Witold Hurewicz
- Maurice Janet
- Vojtěch Jarník
- József Jelitai
- Arvo Junnila
- Gottfried Köthe
- Stefan Kaczmarz
- Jovan Karamata
- Boris Kaufmann
- Béla Kerékjártó
- Aleksandr Khinchin
- Vladimir Kořínek
- Ervand Kogbetliantz
- Maurice Kraitchik
- Franciszek Leja
- Georges Lemaître
- Théophile Lepage
- Arthur Linder
- Louis Locher
- Salomon Lubelski
- Eugene Lukacs
- Kurt Mahler
- Szolem Mandelbrojt
- Frédéric Marty
- Karl Mayr
- Stanisław Mazur
- William Hunter McCrea
- Edward James McShane
- Birger Meidell
- Clifford William Mendel
- Karl Menger
- Émile Merlin
- Albert Metral
- Henri Milloux
- Edward Arthur Milne
- Edward Charles Molina
- Louis Joel Mordell
- Robert Edouard Moritz
- Frank Morley
- Marston Morse
- Theodore Motzkin
- Hugh P. Mulholland
- John Rogers Musselman
- Trygve Nagell
- Paul Nemenyi
- Otto E. Neugebauer
- Bernhard Hermann Neumann
- M. H. A. Newman
- Jakob Nielsen
- Fritz Noether
- Evert Johannes Nyström
- Nikola Obrechkoff
- Albert Cyril Offord
- Rufus Oldenburger
- Octav Onicescu
- Øystein Ore
- Wladyslaw Roman Orlicz
- Carl Wilhelm Oseen
- Rózsa Péter
- George Pólya
- Veikko Paatero
- C. P. Papaioannou
- Alexandru Pantazi
- Fred William Perkins, Jr.
- Ernst Peschl
- Sophie Piccard
- José María Planas Corbella
- Lev Semyonovich Pontrjagin
- Maurice Potron
- Hans Przibram
- Rodolphe Raclis
- Richard Rado
- Erich Reissner
- Tonio Rella
- Paul Reece Rider
- Paul Riebesell
- Marcel Riesz
- Harold Stanley Ruse
- Nilos Sakellariou
- Ricardo San Juan
- Juliusz Schauder
- Jan Arnoldus Schouten
- Henrik Selberg
- Raziuddin Siddiqui
- Carl Ludwig Siegel
- Waclaw Sierpinski
- Avadhesh Narayan Singh
- Thoralf Albert Skolem
- Virgil Snyder
- Andreas Speiser
- Otto Spiess
- Carl Størmer
- Wolfgang Sternberg
- Simion Stoilow
- Marshall Harvey Stone
- cs:Jindřich Svoboda
- John Lighton Synge
- Edward Szpilrajn
- Sven Täcklind
- Ralph Tambs-Lyche
- Olga Taussky-Todd
- L. Tchakaloff
- Victor Thébault
- John Todd
- Charles Chapman Torrance
- Gheorghe Tzitzéica
- Egon Ullrich
- Victor Vâlcovici
- Manuel Sandoval Vallarta
- Oswald Veblen
- Kurt Vogel
- Buzz M. Walker
- Rolin Wavre
- Tadeusz Wazewski
- Alexander Weinstein
- Hermann Weyl
- J. H. C. Whitehead
- David Vernon Widder
- Norbert Wiener
- Herman Wold
- Laurence Chisholm Young
- Kazimierz Zarankiewicz
- Stanisław Zaremba

=== 1950, Cambridge (USA) ===
- Pedro Abellanas
- Abraham Adrian Albert
- Howard Wright Alexander
- Aldo Andreotti
- Richard Arens
- Cahit Arf
- Iacopo Barsotti
- Stefan Bergman
- Peter Gabriel Bergmann
- Harald Bergström
- Arne Beurling
- R. H. Bing
- Garrett Birkhoff
- Salomon Bochner
- Harald Bohr
- Raj Chandra Bose
- Alfred T. Brauer
- Florent Bureau
- Alberto Pedro Calderon
- Henri Cartan
- Mary Lucy Cartwright
- Richard Eliot Chamberlin
- Shiing Shen Chern
- Sarvadaman Chowla
- Alfred Hoblitzelle Clifford
- Edward Foyle Collingwood
- Charles Galton Darwin
- Harold Davenport
- Arnaud Denjoy
- Richard James Duffin
- Albert Edrei
- Paul Erdős
- Gaetano Fichera
- Nathan Jacob Fine
- Ronald Martin Foster
- Ralph Fox
- Kurt Gödel
- Abe Gelbart
- Dario Graffi
- Jacques Hadamard
- Fritz Herzog
- Edwin Hewitt
- Kurt August Hirsch
- W. V. D. Hodge
- Eberhard Hopf
- Heinz Hopf
- Sze-Tsen Hu
- Witold Hurewicz
- Kenkichi Iwasawa
- Shizuo Kakutani
- Stephen Cole Kleene
- Hendrik Douwe Kloosterman
- Paul Lévy
- Hans Lewy
- Kurt Mahler
- Szolem Mandelbrojt
- Marston Morse
- George Polya
- Hans Rademacher
- Franz Rellich
- Joseph Fels Ritt
- Abraham Robinson
- Adolphe Rome
- Samarendra Nath Roy
- Luis Antonio Santalo
- Laurent Schwartz
- Beniamino Segre
- Atle Selberg
- Thoralf Skolem
- Alfred Tarski
- John von Neumann
- Abraham Wald
- André Weil
- Hassler Whitney
- Norbert Wiener
- Raymond Louis Wilder
- Oscar Zariski

=== 1954, Amsterdam ===
- P. S. Alexandrov
- J. Barkley Rosser
- Heinrich Adolph Louis Behnke
- David Blackwell
- Karol Borsuk
- Richard Brauer
- Florent Bureau
- Mary Lucy Cartwright
- Lamberto Cesari
- K. S. Chandrasekharan
- Lothar Collatz
- H. S. M. Coxeter
- Harold Davenport
- Jean Dieudonné
- Joseph L. Doob
- Beno Eckmann
- Paul Erdős
- Arthur Erdélyi
- Gaetano Fichera
- Robert Fortet
- Hans Freudenthal
- Israel Gelfand
- Sydney Goldstein
- Harish Chandra
- Walter Kurt Hayman
- Magnus Rudolph Hestenes
- Einar Hille
- Edmund Hlawka
- Nathan Jacobson
- Børge Jessen
- Joseph Kampé de Fériet
- Kunihiko Kodaira
- A. N. Kolmogorov
- Đuro Kurepa
- André Lichnerowicz
- Paul Lorenzen
- Deane Montgomery
- Andrzej Mostowski
- Pekka Juhana Myrberg
- André Néron
- Jerzy Neyman
- S. M. Nikolskii
- Douglas Geoffrey Northcott
- Christian Yvon Pauc
- Franz Rellich
- Beniamino Segre
- Jean-Pierre Serre
- Eduard Stiefel
- James Johnston Stoker
- Alfred Tarski
- Edward Charles Titchmarsh
- David van Dantzig
- John von Neumann
- Tadeusz Wazewski
- André Weil
- Alexander Weinstein
- Kentaro Yano
- Kosaku Yosida
- Antoni Zygmund

=== 1958, Edinburgh ===
- A. D. Alexandrov
- V. I. Arnold
- Lipman Bers
- Evert Willem Beth
- N. N. Bogolyubov
- Raoul Bott
- Henri Cartan
- S. S. Chern
- Claude Chevalley
- Kai Lai Chung
- Max Deuring
- Samuel Eilenberg
- William Feller
- Lars Gårding
- B. V. Gnedenko
- Hans Grauert
- Alexander Grothendieck
- Maurice Heins
- Graham Higman
- Friedrich Hirzebruch
- Joseph Ehrenfried Hofmann
- Stephen Cole Kleene
- Antoni Kosinski
- Georg Kreisel
- Đuro Kurepa
- Cornelius Lanczos
- Derrick Henry Lehmer
- Yuri Linnik
- Jacques-Louis Lions
- Andrey Markov Jr.
- Teruhisa Matsusaka
- Dmitrii Menshov
- John Willard Milnor
- Subbaramiah Minakshisundaram
- John Coleman Moore
- Masayoshi Nagata
- Albert Nijenhuis
- C. D. Papakyriakopoulos
- L. S. Pontryagin
- Alfréd Rényi
- Peter Roquette
- Klaus Friedrich Roth
- Heinz Rutishauser
- Pierre Samuel
- Leonard Jimmie Savage
- Menahem Max Schiffer
- Beniamino Segre
- Goro Shimura
- Norman Earl Steenrod
- Béla Szőkefalvi-Nagy
- George Frederick James Temple
- René Thom
- G. E. Uhlenbeck
- Adriaan van Wijngaarden
- V. S. Vladimirov
- Hsien Chung Wang
- Helmut Wielandt

=== 1962, Stockholm ===
- John Frank Adams
- Shmuel Agmon
- Aldo Andreotti
- Michael Francis Atiyah
- Maurice Auslander
- Walter Lewis Baily, Jr.
- Marcel Berger
- R. H. Bing
- Armand Borel
- Lennart Carleson
- J. W. S. Cassels
- Gustave Choquet
- Alonzo Church
- Paul Joseph Cohen
- Albrecht Dold
- Bernard Dwork
- E. B. Dynkin
- Beno Eckmann
- Leon Ehrenpreis
- Edwin E. Floyd
- Tudor Ganea
- I. M. Gelfand
- Harold Grad
- Hans Grauert
- Peter K. Henrici
- Heisuke Hironaka
- Lars Hörmander
- Gilbert Agnew Hunt
- Jun Igusa
- Kiyosi Itô
- James Allister Jenkins
- Jean-Pierre Kahane
- Miroslav Katetov
- Michel Kervaire
- Martin Kneser
- A. N. Kolmogorov
- A. I. Kostrikin
- Masatake Kuranishi
- Jean Leray
- Yuri Linnik
- Jerzy Łoś
- Paul Malliavin
- John Milnor
- Jürgen Moser
- David Mumford
- Leopoldo Nachbin
- Raghavan Narasimhan
- M. H. A. Newman
- Louis Nirenberg
- P. S. Novikov
- I. I. Pjateckii-Sapiro
- Andrzej Pliś
- Valentin Poénaru
- I. R. Shafarevich
- Dana Scott
- Atle Selberg
- Jean-Pierre Serre
- G. E. Silov
- Yakov Sinai
- Stephen Smale
- Yuri Mikhailovich Smirnov
- John Robert Stallings, Jr.
- Guido Stampacchia
- Elias M. Stein
- Michio Suzuki
- Béla Szőkefalvi-Nagy
- John Tate
- John Griggs Thompson
- Jacques Tits
- John Wermer
- G. W. Whitehead
- Arthur Strong Wightman

=== 1966, Moscow ===
- Shreeram Shankar Abhyankar
- John Frank Adams
- Mark Aronovich Aizerman
- D. V. Anosov
- V. I. Arnold
- Michael Artin
- Michael Francis Atiyah
- Hyman Bass
- Richard Bellman
- Bryan John Birch
- Errett Albert Bishop
- A. A. Borovkov
- William Browder
- Alberto Pedro Calderon
- Lennart Carleson
- Jean Cerf
- Paul Joseph Cohen
- Ennio De Giorgi
- Jacques Dixmier
- Adrien Douady
- N. V. Efimov
- Peter Elias
- Ju. L. Ersov
- Paul R. Garabedian
- Frederick William Gehring
- V. M. Glushkov
- E. S. Golod
- A. A. Goncar
- Mark Iosifovich Graev
- Hans Grauert
- Ulf Grenander
- André Haefliger
- Jack K. Hale
- Harish-Chandra
- Morris William Hirsch
- I. A. Ibragimov
- Fritz John
- Adolf P. Juskevic
- Wilhelm Klingenberg
- Joseph John Kohn
- Ellis Robert Kolchin
- M. G. Krein
- Olga Ladyzhenskaya
- Peter David Lax
- Olli Lehto
- Bernard Malgrange
- A. I. Malzev
- Yuri I. Manin
- G. I. Marchuk
- Louis Michel
- B. S. Mitjagin
- N. N. Moiseev
- André Néron
- Sergei P. Novikov
- T. Ono
- V. P. Palamodov
- Georges Papy
- Aleksander Pełczyński
- Ilya Piatetski-Shapiro
- V. I. Ponomarev
- Aleksei Georgievich Postnikov
- Reinhold Remmert
- Hugo E. Rossi
- J. Schröder
- Kurt Schütte
- Irving Ezra Segal
- Goro Shimura
- A. B. Sĭdlovsky
- Stephen Smale
- Sergei L. Sobolev
- Charles M. Stein
- Robert Steinberg
- Volker Strassen
- John Trevor Stuart
- John Griggs Thompson
- A. N. Tikhonov
- V. A. Toponogov
- Gregory S. Tseytin
- Kazimierz Urbanik
- Robert Lawson Vaught
- Edoardo Vesentini
- I. M. Vinogradov
- M. I. Vishik
- A. G. Vitushkin
- C. T. C. Wall
- James Hardy Wilkinson
- Erik Christopher Zeeman

=== 1970, Nice ===
- S. I. Adjan
- Shmuel Agmon
- Vladimir Mikhailovich Alekseev
- Frederick J. Almgren, Jr.
- S. A. Amitsur
- Donald Werner Anderson
- Richard Davis Anderson
- Michel André
- Aldo Andreotti
- Anatoli N. Andrianov
- N. U. Arakelyan
- Huzihiro Araki
- Alexander Arhangelskii
- Michael Artin
- Michael Francis Atiyah
- James Ax
- Alan Baker
- Michael Barr
- Oleg V. Besov
- Andrei V. Bitsadze
- Jean-Michel Bony
- Raoul Bott
- Louis Boutet de Monvel
- Richard Brauer
- Egbert Brieskorn
- Felix E. Browder
- William Browder
- François Bruhat
- Donald L. Burkholder
- Pierre Cartier
- J. W. S. Cassels
- A. V. Černavskii
- Rafael Van Severen Chacon
- Shiing-Shen Chern
- Nikolai Chudakov
- Kai Lai Chung
- Paul Moritz Cohn
- Charles Cameron Conley
- John Horton Conway
- Ivan Ilich Danilyuk
- Pierre Deligne
- Aryeh Dvoretzky
- Eugene Dynkin
- David Gregory Ebin
- David Albert Edwards
- James Eells
- J. V. Egorov
- Kenneth David Elworthy
- Ju. L. Ersov
- F. Thomas Farrell
- Solomon Feferman
- Walter Feit
- J. M. G. Fell
- Ciprian Foias
- Frank Forelli
- Otto Forster
- Bent Fuglede
- Harry Furstenberg
- Lars Gårding
- Israel Gelfand
- Ronald Kay Getoor
- Jean Giraud
- George Glauberman
- Daniel Gorenstein
- Phillip Griffiths
- Pierre Grisvard
- Detlef Gromoll
- M. L. Gromov
- Alexander Grothendieck
- Victor Vasilievich Grushin
- Victor Guillemin
- Robert Clifford Gunning
- Günter Harder
- Walter Kurt Hayman
- Zdeněk Hedrlín
- Sigurdur Helgason
- Henry Helson
- Donald Gordon Higman
- Peter Hilton
- Heisuke Hironaka
- Lars Hörmander
- Wu-Chung Hsiang
- Richard Allen Hunt
- Yasutaka Ihara
- Kenkichi Iwasawa
- Zvonimir Janko
- Richard V. Kadison
- Max Karoubi
- Tosio Kato
- Nicholas Michael Katz
- Howard Jerome Keisler
- Harry Kesten
- Reinhardt Kiehl
- Robion Cromwell Kirby
- Steven Lawrence Kleiman
- Shoshichi Kobayashi
- Max Koecher
- Bertram Kostant
- A. I. Kostrikin
- Tomio Kubota
- Nicolaas Hendrik Kuiper
- Masatake Kuranishi
- Shige Toshi Kuroda
- Robert Phelan Langlands
- Richard Lashof
- Francis William Lawvere
- Peter David Lax
- Jerome Paul Levine
- B. M. Levitan
- Joram Lindenstrauss
- Jacques-Louis Lions
- Stanislaw Lojasiewicz
- Santiago Lopez de Medrano
- Ian G. Macdonald
- George Whitelaw Mackey
- Yuri I. Manin
- G. I. Marchuk
- Jerrold Eldon Marsden
- André Martineau
- Yu. V. Matijasevic
- Yves Meyer
- V. M. Millionščikov
- Mario Miranda
- A. S. Mishchenko
- B. G. Moishezon
- Gabriel Mokobodzki
- Paul Monsky
- John Coleman Moore
- Charles B. Morrey, Jr.
- George Daniel Mostow
- David Mumford
- Béla Szőkefalvi-Nagy
- M. A. Naimark
- M. S. Narasimhan
- Bernhard Hermann Neumann
- Sergei P. Novikov
- Olga Oleinik
- Donald S. Ornstein
- Richard Sheldon Palais
- A. N. Paršin
- Bill Parry
- Jaak Peetre
- Franklin Paul Peterson
- Albrecht Pfister
- Frédéric Pham
- Ralph Saul Phillips
- A. V. Pogorelov
- Lev Pontryagin
- Charles C. Pugh
- Lajos Pukánszky
- Daniel Quillen
- Michael Oser Rabin
- M. S. Raghunathan
- Michel Raynaud
- Daniel Rider
- Abraham Robinson
- Helmut Röhrl
- Colin P. Rourke
- Walter Rudin
- Gerald Enoch Sacks
- Mikio Sato
- V. V. Sazonov
- Andrzej Schinzel
- Wolfgang M. Schmidt
- Robert Thomas Seeley
- G. B. Segal
- I. E. Segal
- James Serrin
- C. S. Seshadri
- Igor Shafarevich
- Goro Shimura
- A. N. Shiryayev
- Laurent Siebenmann
- Yakov Sinai
- Maurice Sion
- Donald Clayton Spencer
- V. G. Sprindzuk
- John R. Stallings
- Guido Stampacchia
- Harold Mead Stark
- Elias M. Stein
- Anatoly Mikhailovich Stepin
- Dennis Sullivan
- Michio Suzuki
- Richard G. Swan
- Masamichi Takesaki
- John Tate
- René Thom
- John Griggs Thompson
- Jacques Tits
- Jean-Claude Tougeron
- François Trèves
- Paul Turán
- P. L. Uljanov
- Nina Uraltseva
- Nicholas Varopoulos
- Petr Vopěnka
- C. T. C. Wall
- Robert Fones Williams
- Zvonimir Janko

=== 1974, Vancouver ===
- Norbert A'Campo
- William K. Allard
- R. V. Ambartzumian
- D. V. Anosov
- S. J. Arakelov
- V. I. Arnold
- Claudio Baiocchi
- M. Salah Baouendi
- Wolf Barth
- Kenneth Jon Barwise
- Ja. M. Barzdin
- Hyman Bass
- Heinz Bauer
- Alain Bensoussan
- George Mark Bergman
- Mikhail Shlemovich Birman
- Enrico Bombieri
- Armand Borel
- Rufus Bowen
- James Henry Bramble
- Haim Brezis
- Victor Buchstaber
- Thomas Ashland Chapman
- Jeff Cheeger
- E. W. Cheney
- Zbigniew Ciesielski
- Charles Herbert Clemens
- Alfred Hoblitzelle Clifford
- Jean-Michel Combes
- Alain Connes
- Michael Grain Crandall
- Gerard Debreu
- Pierre Deligne
- Vladimir F. Demyanov
- Roland Dobrushin
- Richard Mansfield Dudley
- G. F. D. Duff
- Michel Duflo
- J. J. Duistermaat
- E. B. Dynkin
- M. M. Dzrbasjan
- David Eisenbud
- Per Enflo
- Jacques Faraut
- Charles Fefferman
- V. V. Filippov
- William J. Firey
- A. T. Fomenko
- Albrecht Fröhlich
- Eberhard Freitag
- Avner Friedman
- Harvey Friedman
- Howard Garland
- Frederick William Gehring
- Stephen M. Gersten
- James Glimm
- B. V. Gnedenko
- András Hajnal
- Thomas Hawkins
- Henry Hermes
- Horst Herrlich
- Alan J. Hoffman
- Christopher Hooley
- Roger Evans Howe
- Wu-Yi Hsiang
- Peter J. Huber
- Masahisa Inoue
- Bjarni Jónsson
- Hervé Jacquet
- A. A. Karacuba
- David Kazhdan
- David Kinderlehrer
- Victor Klee
- Daniel J. Kleitman
- Anthony W. Knapp
- Nikolai Pavlovich Korneichuk
- Heinz-Otto Kreiss
- Wolfgang Krieger
- Harold J. Kushner
- Oscar Lanford
- H. Blaine Lawson
- Jacqueline Lelong-Ferrand
- A. F. Leontiev
- Elliott H. Lieb
- Rolf Lindner
- Jacques-Louis Lions
- George Lusztig
- G. A. Margulis
- Lawrence Markus
- André Martin
- Bernard Maskit
- John N. Mather
- Geoffrey Matthews
- Bernard Maurey
- Barry Mazur
- V. D. Mazurov
- Kevin McCrimmon
- Peter McMullen
- Albert R. Meyer
- R. James Milgram
- Eric Charles Milner
- Hugh Lowell Montgomery
- P. A. P. Moran
- Yiannis N. Moschovakis
- N. N. Nehorosev
- Edward Nelson
- Jacques Neveu
- Louis Nirenberg
- Michael Stewart Paterson
- V. K. Patodi
- Mauricio Matos Peixoto
- Ted Petrie
- Vladimir Petrovich Platonov
- Daniel Quillen
- Richard Rado
- C. R. Rao
- John Robert Ringrose
- Claude Ambrose Rogers
- H. L. Royden
- Mary Ellen Rudin
- S. S. Ryshkov
- A. A. Samarski
- Winfried Scharlau
- Wolfgang M. Schmidt
- Paul A. Schweitzer
- Saharon Shelah
- Jack Silver
- Barry Simon
- Isadore Manuel Singer
- Andrei A. Slavnov
- Frank Spitzer
- Erling Størmer
- Vytautas Statulevičius
- S. A. Stepanov
- Hans J. Stetter
- Gilbert Strang
- Volker Strassen
- Kurt Strebel
- A. I. Subbotin
- Dennis Sullivan
- Aleksei Georgievich Sveshnikov
- Moss Eisenberg Sweedler
- Endre Szemerédi
- Joseph L. Taylor
- William Thurston
- Jacques Tits
- Clifford Truesdell
- John Wilder Tukey
- V. S. Varadarajan
- A. N. Varchenko
- Anatoly Vershik
- M. I. Vishik
- A. G. Vitushkin
- Valentin Evgenyevich Voskresenskii
- Bertram Walsh
- John Walsh
- Benjamin Weiss
- James Hardy Wilkinson
- Philip Wolfe
- C. E. Mike Yates
- Vladimir E. Zakharov
- Erik Christopher Zeeman
- Dmitry Petrovich Zhelobenko

=== 1978, Helsinki ===
- Lars Valerian Ahlfors
- Frederick J. Almgren, Jr.
- Huzihiro Araki
- Michael Aschbacher
- Michael Francis Atiyah
- Robert J. Aumann
- Albert Baernstein II
- Thomas Francis Banchoff
- William Beckner
- I. N. Bernshtein
- Spencer Bloch
- F. A. Bogomolov
- O. I. Bogoyavlensky
- Jerry Bona
- A. A. Borovkov
- Sergei Viktorovich Bochkarev
- Kenneth Stephen Brown
- A. D. Bruno
- Pavol Brunovsky
- Alberto Pedro Calderon
- James Weldon Cannon
- Sylvain Edward Cappell
- William Casselman
- A. J. Casson
- G. V. Chudnovsky
- Francis H. Clarke
- John H. Coates
- Robert Connelly
- Alain Connes
- John Horton Conway
- Carl R. de Boor
- Claude Dellacherie
- Jacques Dixmier
- Manfredo P. do Carmo
- Roland Dobrushin
- Ronald George Douglas
- V. G. Drinfeld
- Robert Duncan Edwards
- Ivar Ekeland
- L. D. Faddeev
- Bernd Fischer
- Ciprian Foias
- Jürg Fröhlich
- Dmitry Fuks
- Masatoshi Fukushima
- Adriano Mario Garsia
- David Gieseker
- Daniel Gorenstein
- Phillip A. Griffiths
- M. L. Gromov
- Wolfgang Haken
- Leo Harrington
- Allen Edward Hatcher
- Michael Robert Herman
- Melvin Hochster
- Ju. S. Ilyashenko
- Victor Ivrii
- Henryk Iwaniec
- S. V. Jablonskii
- Arthur Jaffe
- V. G. Kac
- Masaki Kashiwara
- Nicholas Michael Katz
- George Kempf
- V. M. Kharlamov
- A. A. Kirillov
- Boris Korenblum
- Nikolai N. Krasovskii
- Nicolai V. Krylov
- R. P. Langlands
- David G. Larman
- James Lepowsky
- James P. Lin
- Eduard Looijenga
- Angus J. Macintyre
- Ib Madsen
- G. S. Makanin
- John Mallet-Paret
- Yuri I. Manin
- Sibe Mardesic
- A. I. Markushevich
- Donald A. Martin
- Richard McGehee
- Henry P. McKean
- Richard Burt Melrose
- Jürgen Moser
- E. M. Nikishin
- N. K. Nikolskii
- Joachim A. Nitsche
- Sergei P. Novikov
- Robert Osserman
- Jacob Palis
- Roger Penrose
- Ilya Piatetski-Shapiro
- V. P. Platonov
- Claudio Procesi
- Paul H. Rabinowitz
- S. Ramanan
- Douglas Conner Ravenel
- Pierre-Arnaud Raviart
- Pal Revesz
- Andrei Vladimirovich Roiter
- Gian-Carlo Rota
- Grzegorz Rozenberg
- Shoichiro Sakai
- A. A. Samarski
- Wilfried Schmid
- Goro Shimura
- Katsuhiro Shiohama
- A. N. Shiryayev
- Charles Coffin Sims
- Yakov Sinai
- Yum-Tong Siu
- Johannes Sjöstrand
- Henri Skoda
- Robert Irving Soare
- Andrei Suslin
- H. J. Sussmann
- Vidar Thomee
- William Paul Thurston
- Robert Tijdeman
- Kenji Ueno
- Dietmar Uhlig
- Jussi Väisälä
- Wilberd van der Kallen
- S. R. S. Varadhan
- Robert Charles Vaughan
- Nolan Russell Wallach
- André Weil
- Alan Weinstein
- Alexander D. Wentzell
- J. E. West
- Gavin C. Wraith
- Shing-Tung Yau
- Gregg Jay Zuckerman

=== 1983, Warsaw ===
- Michael Aizenman
- Antonio Ambrosetti
- Anatoli N. Andrianov
- V. I. Arnold
- James Arthur
- Richard Askey
- John MacLeod Ball
- Wolf Barth
- Alexander Beilinson
- Jean-Michel Bony
- Jean Bourgain
- David R. Brillinger
- Roger Ware Brockett
- V. S. Buslaev
- Luis Caffarelli
- Shiu-Yuen Cheng
- Gregory L. Cherlin
- D. M. Chibisov
- Frederick Ronald Cohen
- Ralph Louis Cohen
- B. E. J. Dahlberg
- Ennio De Giorgi
- Simon Kirwan Donaldson
- Bjorn Engquist
- Paul Erdős
- Gregory Eskin
- Tadeusz Figiel
- Wendell Helms Fleming
- Dominique Foata
- Jean-Marc Fontaine
- John Erik Fornaess
- Michael Hartley Freedman
- Hans Freudenthal
- William Fulton
- Jean-Yves Girard
- Roland Glowinski
- Gene Howard Golub
- R. L. Graham
- Robert Griess
- M. L. Gromov
- Joe Harris
- F. Reese Harvey
- D. R. Heath-Brown
- Gennadi M. Henkin
- Nigel James Hitchin
- Christopher Hooley
- Wu-Chung Hsiang
- Shigeru Iitaka
- Vasilii Alekseevich Iskovskikh
- R. S. Ismagilov
- Tadeusz Iwaniec
- Jens Carsten Jantzen
- Peter Wilcox Jones
- Anthony Joseph
- Feng Kang
- Richard Karp
- B. S. Kašin
- G. G. Kasparov
- Anatole Katok
- Steven Paul Kerckhoff
- Harry Kesten
- L. G. Khachiyan
- A. G. Khovanskii
- Sergiu Klainerman
- Hans-Wilhelm Knobloch
- Nancy Kopell
- A. B. Kurzanskii
- Yuri A. Kuznetsov
- Olga Ladyzhenskaya
- Andrzej Lasota
- Peter David Lax
- A. A. Letichevsky
- Wen-Hsiung Lin
- Pierre-Louis Lions
- Peter Albert Loeb
- László Lovász
- George Lusztig
- Robert Duncan MacPherson
- Andrew Majda
- Paul Malliavin
- Benoit B. Mandelbrot
- Petr Mandl
- Ricardo Mane
- V. P. Maslov
- David William Masser
- Barry Mazur
- Yves Meyer
- Charles Anthony Micchelli
- Michal Misiurewicz
- Shigefumi Mori
- Werner Müller
- Arthur Ogus
- Alexander Yu. Olshanskii
- Toshio Oshima
- Konrad Osterwalder
- Rajagopalan Parthasarathy
- Boris Pavlov (mathematician)
- Aleksander Pełczyński
- Sergey Pinchuk
- Gilles Pisier
- Gordon Plotkin
- A. V. Pogorelov
- M. J. D. Powell
- Michael O. Rabin
- Kenneth Alan Ribet
- Claus Michael Ringel
- R. T. Rockafellar
- David Ruelle
- Mikio Sato
- Wolfgang M. Schmidt
- Richard M. Schoen
- George Roger Sell
- James Serrin
- Julius L. Shaneson
- Saharon Shelah
- Richard Arnold Shore
- Leon Simon
- Yum-Tong Siu
- A. O. Slisenko
- Christophe Soulé
- Richard P. Stanley
- Daniel W. Stroock
- Yuri M. Svirezhev
- Leon Takhtajan
- Robert Tarjan
- Bernard Teissier
- René Thom
- Karen Uhlenbeck
- Leslie Gabriel Valiant
- J. H. van Lint
- Pierre van Moerbeke
- A. B. Venkov
- Michèle Vergne
- E. B. Vinberg
- Oleg Yanovich Viro
- Dan-Virgil Voiculescu
- Jean-Loup Waldspurger
- Shinzo Watanabe
- S. L. Woronowicz
- Jerzy Zabczyk
- Vladimir E. Zakharov
- Efim Zelmanov
- B. I. Zilber

=== 1986, Berkeley ===
- A. B. Aleksandrov
- Hans Wilhelm Alt
- Taivo Arak
- Enrico Arbarello
- Maurice Auslander
- Tadeusz Balaban
- Hans Werner Ballmann
- Isabella Bashmakova
- Arnaud Beauville
- József Beck
- G. V. Belyi
- Jean-Michel Bismut
- Anders Björner
- Manuel Blum
- Walter Borho
- Mikhail V. Borovoi
- H. J. M. Bos
- Jean Bourgain
- Franco Brezzi
- Michel Broué
- Robert Bryant
- Gunnar Carlsson
- A. J. Casson
- David Catlin
- Sun-Yung Alice Chang
- Jeff Cheeger
- Alexandre Joel Chorin
- Herbert Clemens
- Laurent Clozel
- Yves Colin de Verdière
- Jean-Louis Colliot-Thelene
- Alain Connes
- Germund Dahlquist
- Guy David
- Alexander Munro Davie
- M. H. A. Davis
- Louis de Branges
- Corrado De Concini
- Ronald J. DiPerna
- Simon Kirwan Donaldson
- Adrien Douady
- V. G. Drinfeld
- Jean-Pierre Eckmann
- Edward George Effros
- G. P. Egorychev
- Yakov Eliashberg
- Lawrence Craig Evans
- Gerd Faltings
- Jürg Fröhlich
- Péter Frankl
- Igor Frenkel
- Pierre Gabriel
- Giovanni Gallavotti
- John B. Garnett
- Krzysztof Gawedzki
- Frederick William Gehring
- Stuart Geman
- Mariano Giaquinta
- Vitaly Ginzburg
- Efim D. Gluskin
- S. K. Godunov
- Dorian Goldfeld
- A. A. Gonchar
- J. V. Grabiner
- Christine Graffigne
- D. Yu. Grigor'ev
- M. L. Gromov
- Benedict Hyman Gross
- Uffe Haagerup
- Richard S. Hamilton
- R. M. Hardt
- Thomas W. Hawkins, Jr.
- Dennis Arnold Hejhal
- Haruzo Hida
- Werner Hildenbrand
- Alexander Holevo
- Victor Ivrii
- Henryk Iwaniec
- M. V. Jakobson
- V. F. R. Jones
- Jürgen Jost
- Jean-Pierre Kahane
- Narendra Karmarkar
- David Kazhdan
- Alexander S. Kechris
- Carlos Eduardo Kenig
- H. V. Koch
- V. V. Kozlov
- R. E. Krichevsky
- N. G. Kruzhilin
- A. V. Kryazhimskii
- Nicolai V. Krylov
- Hiroshi Kunita
- Ivan A. K. Kupka
- Philip Caesar Kutzko
- Alistair H. Lachlan
- Oscar Lanford
- László Lempert
- Hendrik Willem Lenstra
- Thomas Milton Liggett
- Menachem Magidor
- Nikolai G. Makarov
- Yuri I. Manin
- John N. Mather
- William Hamilton Meeks, III
- Alexander Merkurjev
- Jean-François Mertens
- Haynes Miller
- Vitali Milman
- Tetsuji Miwa
- John Willard Morgan
- V. V. Nikulin
- Andrew Michael Odlyzko
- Alexander M. Olevskii
- Steven Alan Orszag
- George C. Papanicolaou
- L. A. Pastur
- Mikhail G. Peretyatkin
- Yakov Pesin
- Nicholas Pippenger
- Vladimir L. Popov
- Frank Quinn
- A. A. Razborov
- John Rinzel
- Ernst Alfred Ruh
- Arnold Schönhage
- Vladimir Scheffer
- Richard Melvin Schoen
- Alexander Schrijver
- Jacob T. Schwartz
- Zbigniew Semadeni
- Caroline Series
- Paul D. Seymour
- Peter B. Shalen
- Adi Shamir
- Micha Sharir
- Saharon Shelah
- V. V. Shokurov
- A. V. Skorokhod
- Stephen Smale
- V. A. Solonnikov
- Thomas Spencer
- Elias M. Stein
- Charles Joel Stone
- Dennis Sullivan
- A. A. Suslin
- Floris Takens
- Clifford Taubes
- Tammo Tom Dieck
- Anthony Joseph Tromba
- Nina Uraltseva
- Eckart Viehweg
- David Alexander Vogan
- Gisbert Wüstholz
- Henry Christian Wente
- Alex Wilkie
- R. L. Wilson
- Edward Witten
- Thomas Hartwig Wolff
- Scott Andrew Wolpert
- W. Hugh Woodin
- Wu Wen-Tsun
- Victor Yakhot
- Don Zagier
- Eduard Zehnder
- Robert Jeffrey Zimmer

=== 1990, Kyoto ===
- Noga Alon
- Marcel Bökstedt
- László Babai
- Dan Barbasch
- Martin T. Barlow
- Rodney James Baxter
- Eric Douglas Bedford
- Spencer Bloch
- Lenore Blum
- Francis Bonahon
- César Camacho
- Peter J. Cameron
- Lennart Carleson
- Jon F. Carlson
- Alexandre L. Chistov
- Michael Christ
- Demetrios Christodoulou
- Ronald Raphael Coifman
- Stephen Arthur Cook
- Jean-Michel Coron
- Joachim Cuntz
- Persi Diaconis
- Roland L. Dobrushin
- Sergio Doplicher
- Richard Timothy Durrett
- Jean Écalle
- Boris L. Feigin
- Joel Feldman
- Andreas Floer
- Kenji Fukaya
- Hillel Furstenberg
- Matthias Günther
- David Gabai
- Étienne Ghys
- Henri Gillet
- Shafi Goldwasser
- Thomas G. Goodwillie
- Cameron Gordon
- Rostislav Grigorchuk
- Karsten Grove
- Günter Harder
- Ami Harten
- Helmut Hofer
- Philip Holmes
- Annick Horiuchi
- Ehud Hrushovski
- Craig Huneke
- Martin Huxley
- Kiyoshi Igusa
- Yasutaka Ihara
- Mitsuru Ikawa
- Ju. S. Ilyashenko
- Alexander A. Ivanov
- Michio Jimbo
- Lowell E. Jones
- Vaughan F. R. Jones
- William Morton Kahan
- Alexander V. Karzanov
- Masaki Kashiwara
- Kazuya Kato
- Yujiro Kawamata
- Alexander R. Kemer
- János Kollár
- Victor Kolyvagin
- Shinichi Kotani
- Robert Krasny
- Igor Krichever
- Peter B. Kronheimer
- Antti Kupiainen
- Shigeo Kusuoka
- Jesper Lützen
- Gérard Laumon
- Robert Kendall Lazarsfeld
- Lucien Marie Le Cam
- Gilles Lebeau
- Fang-Hua Lin
- Pierre-Louis Lions
- László Lovász
- Sylvia Chin-Pi Lu
- George Lusztig
- Colette Moeglin
- Andrew Joseph Majda
- Yuri I. Manin
- Grigory Margulis
- Olivier Mathieu
- Toshihiko Matsuki
- Dusa McDuff
- Curt McMullen
- Richard Burt Melrose
- Yves F. Meyer
- John J. Millson
- Masayasu Mimura
- Stanislav A. Molchanov
- Masatake Mori
- Shigefumi Mori
- Shigeyuki Morita
- Henri Moscovici
- Takafumi Murai
- Haruo Murakami
- Anatoly I. Neishtadt
- Yuri Valentinovich Nesterenko
- Sheldon E. Newhouse
- Adrian Ocneanu
- Takeo Ohsawa
- Michael V. Pimsner
- Sorin Popa
- Gopal Prasad
- David Preiss
- Vojtěch Rödl
- Stephen Rallis
- Mary Rees
- James Renegar
- Nicolai Reshetikhin
- Paul Calvin Roberts
- Klaus Wilhelm Roggenkamp
- Kyoji Saito
- Morihiko Saito
- Leslie Saper
- Peter Clive Sarnak
- Pierre Schapira
- Albert Schwarz
- Graeme Segal
- Tetsuji Shioda
- Eugenii I. Shustin
- Nessim Sibony
- Israel Michael Sigal
- Carlos Tschudi Simpson
- Yakov Sinai
- Georges Skandalis
- Theodore Allen Slaman
- John R. Steel
- Joseph H. M. Steenbrink
- Michael Struwe
- Toshikazu Sunada
- Kanehisa Takasaki
- Michel Talagrand
- Éva Tardos
- Luc Tartar
- Michael E. Taylor
- Robert W. Thomason
- Carsten Thomassen
- Gang Tian
- Akihiro Tsuchiya
- Vladimir Turaev
- Karen Uhlenbeck
- Lou van den Dries
- Alexandre Varchenko
- Nicholas Theodore Varopoulos
- Paul Vojta
- Alexander Volberg
- Avi Wigderson
- S. L. Woronowicz
- Jean-Christophe Yoccoz
- Marc Yor
- Efim Zelmanov

=== 1994, Zürich ===
- Jeffrey Adams
- Andrei A. Agrachev
- Henning Haahr Andersen
- Michael T. Anderson
- Marco Avellaneda
- László Babai
- Victor Bangert
- Richard F. Bass
- James E. Baumgartner
- J. Thomas Beale
- Jean Bellissard
- A. A. Bolibruch
- Sergey V. Bolotin
- Richard Ewen Borcherds
- Jean Bourgain
- Michel Brion
- Marc Burger
- Colin J. Bushnell
- Kung Ching Chang
- Jean-Yves Chemin
- Fan R. K. Chung
- Philippe G. Ciarlet
- Phillip Colella
- Peter Constantin
- John Horton Conway
- Kevin Corlette
- Constantine Michael Dafermos
- Wolfgang Dahmen
- S. G. Dani
- Ingrid Daubechies
- Donald Andrew Dawson
- Jean-Pierre Demailly
- David L. Donoho
- David Drasin
- Noam Elkies
- George A. Elliott
- Gerd Faltings
- Giovanni Felder
- Hans Föllmer
- Jürg Fröhlich
- John Franks
- Edward Frenkel
- John B. Friedlander
- Zoltán Füredi
- Jürgen Gärtner
- Alexander Givental
- Oded Goldreich
- Gene H. Golub
- Robert Ernest Gompf
- Alexander Goncharov
- William Timothy Gowers
- Andrew Granville
- Manoussos G. Grillakis
- David Harbater
- Jan P. Hogendijk
- Michael Jerome Hopkins
- Deborah Hughes Hallett
- Uwe Jannsen
- David Jerison
- Mark Jerrum
- Jeffry Kahn
- Gil Kalai
- Nikolaos Kapouleas
- Joseph B. Keller
- Eugene Khruslov
- Eberhard Kirchberg
- Frances Kirwan
- Maxim Kontsevich
- Olga Ladyzhenskaya
- Jean Lannes
- H. Blaine Lawson
- Claude LeBrun
- François Ledrappier
- Tom Leighton
- Leonid Levin
- Jian-Shu Li
- Jun Li
- Elliott H. Lieb
- Pierre-Louis Lions
- Peter Littelmann
- Roberto Longo
- Alain Louveau
- Alexander Lubotzky
- John Edwin Luecke
- Mikhail Lyubich
- Zhi-Ming Ma
- Ricardo Mane
- Howard Masur
- Hiroshi Matano
- David W. McLaughlin
- Joyce R. McLaughlin
- Jean-François Mestre
- Yoichi Miyaoka
- Ngaiming Mok
- Greg Moore (physicist)
- David R. Morrison
- Tomasz Mrowka
- Charles M. Newman
- Noam Nisan
- Madhav Vithal Nori
- Edward Wilfred Odell, Jr.
- Stanley Osher
- George Oster
- Étienne Pardoux
- Raman Parimala
- Karen Hunger Parshall
- K. R. Parthasarathy (probabilist)
- Grigori Perelman
- Edwin Arend Perkins
- Bernadette Perrin-Riou
- Benoit Perthame
- Duong Hong Phong
- Anand Pillay
- Carl Pomerance
- Pavel Pudlak
- Jean-Pierre Quadrat
- Michael Rapoport
- Marina Ratner
- Eliyahu Rips
- Raoul Robert
- Vladimir Rokhlin, Jr.
- Joachim H. Rubinstein
- Alexei N. Rudakov
- Dietmar Arno Salamon
- Jesús María Sanz-Serna
- Joel Schneider
- Erhard Scholz
- Gerald W. Schwarz
- Stephen W. Semmes
- Paul Seymour
- Julius L. Shaneson
- Jalal Shatah
- Mitsuhiro Shishikura
- Gordon Douglas Slade
- Wolfgang Soergel
- Christopher Donald Sogge
- Eduardo D. Sontag
- Panagiotis E. Souganidis
- Joel Spencer
- Joel Spruck
- John Stillwell
- Stephan Stolz
- Andrei Suslin
- Vladimir Sverak
- Hiroshi Tanaka
- Clifford Taubes
- Richard Taylor
- Eugene Trubowitz
- Pekka Tukia
- Michel Van den Bergh
- S. R. S. Varadhan
- Victor A. Vassiliev
- Anatoly M. Vershik
- Marcelo Viana
- Claude Viterbo
- Dan-Virgil Voiculescu
- Claire Voisin
- Jean-Loup Waldspurger
- Antony Wassermann
- Sidney M. Webster
- Shmuel Weinberger
- Andrew Wiles
- Mariusz Wodzicki
- Jean-Christophe Yoccoz
- Lai-Sang Young

=== 1998, Berlin ===
- Miklós Ajtai
- David Aldous
- George E. Andrews
- James Arthur
- Michèle Artigue
- Paul S. Aspinwall
- Kari Astala
- Marco Avellaneda
- Victor V. Batyrev
- Bonnie Berger
- Vladimir G. Berkovich
- Joseph Bernstein
- Fabrice Bethuel
- Gregory Beylkin
- Jean-Michel Bismut
- Eugene Bogomolny
- Béla Bollobás
- Maury Bramson
- Detlev Buchholz
- Dmitri Burago
- Maria G. Bartolini Bussi
- Jennifer Tour Chayes
- Karine Chemla
- Ivan Cherednik
- F. Michael Christ
- Tobias Colding
- Pierre Collet
- Pierre Colmez
- William Cook
- Maurizio Cornalba
- Joseph Dauben
- Miguel De Guzman
- Aise Johan de Jong
- Welington de Melo
- Percy Deift
- Christopher Deninger
- Persi Diaconis
- Robbert Dijkgraaf
- Simon Donaldson
- A.N. Dranishnikov
- Andreas Dress
- Boris Dubrovin
- William Duke
- William G. Dwyer
- Yakov Eliashberg
- L. Håkan Eliasson
- Björn Engquist
- Alex Eskin
- Joan Feigenbaum
- Ronald Fintushel
- Matthew Foreman
- András Frank
- Michael Freedman
- Mark Freidlin
- Eric Friedlander
- Giovanni Gallavotti
- Sylvestre Gallot
- Jayanta Ghosh
- Antonio Giorgilli
- Michel Goemans
- Friedrich Götze
- Yury Grabovsky
- Gian Michele Graf
- François Gramain
- Jeremy Gray
- Mark Green
- Leslie Greengard
- Ulf Grenander
- Wolfgang Hackbusch
- Peter Hall
- Johan Håstad
- Shuhei Hayashi
- Frédéric Hélein
- Michael Herman
- Nigel Higson
- Greg Hjorth
- Bernard R. Hodgson
- Helmut Hofer
- Frank Hoppensteadt
- Thomas Hou
- Ehud Hrushovski
- Gerhard Huisken
- Gérard Iooss
- Sergei V. Ivanov
- Robert R. Jensen
- Iain M. Johnstone
- Dominic Joyce
- William Kantor
- Mikhail Kapranov
- Yuri Kifer
- Robert Kottwitz
- Sergei B. Kuksin
- Krystyna Kuperberg
- François Labourie
- Michael Lacey
- Laurent Lafforgue
- Alain Lascoux
- Jean-François Le Gall
- Donald John Lewis
- Hans Lindblad
- Joachim Lohkamp
- Ian G. Macdonald
- Matei Machedon
- Mark Mahowald
- Stéphane Mallat
- Gunter Malle
- Jiří Matoušek
- Pertti Mattila
- Barry M. McCoy
- Dusa McDuff
- Curtis T. McMullen
- Loïc Merel
- Frank Merle
- Vitali Milman
- Graeme Milton
- Tetsuji Miwa
- Shinichi Mochizuki
- Cathleen Synge Morawetz
- Jürgen Moser
- Shahar Mozes
- Detlef Müller
- Stefan Müller
- Ludomir Newelski
- Harald Niederreiter
- Mogens Niss
- Jorge Nocedal
- Tomotada Ohtsuki
- Hisashi Okamoto
- Bob Oliver
- George Papanicolaou
- Charles S. Peskin
- Sergey Pinchuk
- Ulrich Pinkall
- Gilles Pisier
- Toniann Pitassi
- Leonid Polterovich
- Gustavo Ponce
- Aleksandr V. Pukhlikov
- William R. Pulleyblank
- Rolf Rannacher
- Idun Reiten
- Jeremy Rickard
- Aline Robert
- Yongbin Ruan
- Mikhail V. Safonov
- Peter Sarnak
- Hans Peter Schlickewei
- Roberto H. Schonmann
- Alexander Schrijver
- Kristian Seip
- Vera Serganova
- Aner Shalev
- Peter Shor
- David Siegmund
- Karl Sigmund
- Neil Sloane
- Feodor A. Smirnov
- David A. Smith
- Hart F. Smith
- Hans-Georg Steiner
- Ronald J. Stern
- James W. Stigler
- Jan-Olov Strömberg
- Madhu Sudan
- Grzegorz Swiatek
- Alain-Sol Sznitman
- Michel Talagrand
- Clifford Taubes
- Joseph A. Thas
- Stevo Todorčević
- Nicole Tomczak-Jaegermann
- Lloyd N. Trefethen
- Boris Tsirelson
- Takeshi Tsuji
- Gunther Uhlmann
- Cumrun Vafa
- Marcelo Viana
- Vinicio Villani
- Kari Vilonen
- Vladimir Voevodsky
- Stephen Wainger
- Minoru Wakimoto
- Emo Welzl
- Alex Wilkie
- Jan Camiel Willems
- Ruth J. Williams
- Thomas Hartwig Wolff
- Zhihong Xia
- Dmitri Yafaev
- Horng-Tzer Yau
- Andrei Zelevinsky
- Shou-Wu Zhang
- Joachem Zowe

=== 2002, Beijing ===
- Semyon Alesker
- Noga Alon
- Luigi Ambrosio
- Ben Andrews
- Douglas N. Arnold
- Sanjeev Arora
- Hajer Bahouri
- Deborah Loewenberg Ball
- Imre Bárány
- Robert Bartnik
- Gérard Ben Arous
- Michael Benedicks
- Jean Bertoin
- Mladen Bestvina
- Philippe Biane
- Peter J. Bickel
- Stephen Bigelow
- Paul Biran
- Dietmar Bisch
- Aart Blokhuis
- Erwin Bolthausen
- Christian Bonatti
- Alexei Bondal
- Umberto Bottazzini
- Élisabeth Bouscaren
- Hubert Bray
- Yann Brenier
- Alberto Bressan
- Jean Bricmont
- Lawrence D. Brown
- Luis Caffarelli
- Sun-Yung Alice Chang
- Yu. V. Chekanov
- Jean-Yves Chemin
- Mu-Fa Chen
- Xiuxioung Chen
- Alain Chenciner
- James W. Cogdell
- Albert Cohen
- Henri Cohen
- Gérard Cornuéjols
- Patrick Delorme
- James Demmel
- Jan Denef
- Weiyue Ding
- David Donoho
- Jean-Luc Dorier
- Michael R. Douglas
- Weinan E
- Jean-Pierre Eckmann
- Moritz Epple
- Alexandre Eremenko
- Hélène Esnault
- Pavel Etingof
- Ludvig Faddeev
- Uriel Feige
- Eduard Feireisl
- Bernold Fiedler
- Philippe Flajolet
- Jean-Marc Fontaine
- Giovanni Forni
- Dan Freed
- Mikio Furuta
- Dennis Gaitsgory
- Liming Ge
- Emmanuel Giroux
- Moti Gitik
- Shafi Goldwasser
- Lothar Göttsche
- Lei Guo
- Uffe Haagerup
- Thomas Hales
- Vagn Lunsgaard Hansen
- Michael Harris
- Juha Heinonen
- Lars Hesselholt
- Jiaxing Hong
- Michael Hopkins
- Kentaro Hori
- Celia Hoyles
- Hesheng Hu
- A. Huber
- Russell Impagliazzo
- Eleny-Nicole Ionel
- Hans Niels Jahnke
- Svetlana Jitomirskaya
- Kurt Johansson
- Victor Kac
- Gabriele Kaiser
- Ravindran Kannan
- Nicole El Karoui
- Kazuya Kato
- Carlos E. Kenig
- Harry Kesten
- Tero Kilpeläinen
- Guido Kings
- Frances Kirwan
- Alexander Klyachko
- Toshiyuki Kobayashi
- Nancy Kopell
- Stephen S. Kudla
- Laurent Lafforgue
- Vincent Lafforgue
- Daniel Lascar
- Rafael Latala
- Greg Lawler
- Nicolas Lerner
- Frederick Leung
- Marc Levine
- Peter Wai-Kwong Li
- YanYan Li
- Nati Linial
- Kefeng Liu
- Tai-Ping Liu
- Yiming Long
- Mitchell Luskin
- Vladimir Mazya
- Michael Liam McQuillan
- Vikram Bhagvandas Mehta
- Eckhard Meinrenken
- Alexander Mielke
- Nitsa Movshovitz-Hadar
- Shigeru Mukai
- David Mumford
- Bruno Nachtergaele
- Hiraku Nakajima
- Maxim Nazarov
- Nikita A. Nekrasov
- Masatoshi Noumi
- Dmitri Olegovich Orlov
- Felix Otto
- Rahul Pandharipande
- Yuval Peres
- Anton Petrunin
- Ilya Piatetski-Shapiro
- Richard Pink
- Agoston Pisztora
- Cheryl Praeger
- Enrique Pujals
- Anjing Qu
- Alfio Quarteroni
- Rolf Rannacher
- Ran Raz
- Bruce Reed
- Miles Reid
- Y. Ritov
- Tristan Rivière
- Tom Romberg
- Xiaochun Rong
- Markus Rost
- Karl Rubin
- Daniel J. Rudolph
- Tobias Rydén
- Vadim Schechtman
- Christoph Schwab
- Richard Schwartz
- Paul Seidel
- Zlil Sela
- James Sethian
- Freydoon Shahidi
- Leonid Pavlovich Shilnikov
- Yum-Tong Siu
- John Smillie
- Terry Speed
- Daniel Spielman
- J.T. Stafford
- Eitan Tadmor
- Dmitry Tamarkin
- Daniel Tătaru
- Richard Taylor
- Peter Teichner
- Christoph Thiele
- Gang Tian
- Ulrike Tillmann
- Burt Totaro
- Craig A. Tracy
- Dmitrii Treschev
- Emmanuel Ullmo
- Marie-France Vignéras
- Schicheng Wang
- Xu-Jia Wang
- Brian Cabell White
- Peter Winkler
- Edward Witten
- Maciej P. Wojtkowski
- W. Hugh Woodin
- Trevor Wooley
- Sijue Wu
- Shutie Xiao
- Zhouping Xin
- Jia-An Yan
- Ivan Yaschenko
- Andrei Yurevich Zaitsev
- Ofer Zeitouni
- Steve Zelditch
- Weiping Zhang
- Xiangyu Zhou
- Günter M. Ziegler
- Maciej Zworski

=== 2006, Madrid ===
- Oleg N. Ageev
- Ian Agol
- Manindra Agrawal
- Valery Alexeev
- Michèle Artigue
- Franck Barthe
- Alexander Barvinok
- Vitaly Bergelson
- Roman Bezrukavnikov
- Manjul Bhargava
- Stefano Bianchini
- Mario Bonk
- Vivek Borkar
- Jean-Benoît Bost
- Mireille Bousquet-Mélou
- Anton Bovier
- Stephen P. Boyd
- Alexander Braverman
- Simon Brendle
- Tom Bridgeland
- Martin Bridson
- Russel E. Caflisch
- Emmanuel Candès
- Vicent Caselles
- Alberto S. Cattaneo
- Raphaël Cerf
- Ching-Li Chai
- Zhiming Chen
- Shiu-Yuen Cheng
- Yvonne Choquet-Bruhat
- Leo Corry
- William Crawley-Boevey
- Henri Darmon
- Rafael de la Llave
- Jan de Lange
- Ehud de Shalit
- Percy Deift
- Jean-Pierre Demailly
- Amir Dembo
- Bernard Derrida
- Ronald DeVore
- Dmitry Dolgopyat
- Peter Donnelly
- Rod Downey
- Marcus du Sautoy
- Ricardo G. Durán
- Nira Dyn
- Lawrence Ein
- Yakov Eliashberg
- K. David Elworthy
- Oleg Yu. Emanouilov
- Jianqing Fan
- Kazuhiro Fujiwara
- Patrick Gérard
- Bert Gerards
- Robert Ghrist
- Étienne Ghys
- François Golse
- Martin Grötschel
- Tom Graber
- Gian Michele Graf
- Ben Green
- Michael Griebel
- Ian Grojnowski
- Fritz Grunewald
- Niccolò Guicciardini
- Alice Guionnet
- Max Gunzburger
- Matthew Gursky
- Mark Haiman
- Richard S. Hamilton
- Guy Henniart
- Steve Hofmann
- Alexander Holevo
- Ko Honda
- Jun-Muk Hwang
- Hitoshi Ishii
- Henryk Iwaniec
- Iain M. Johnstone
- Vadim Kaloshin
- Michael Kapovich
- Kazuya Kato
- Bernhard Keller
- Petar Kenderov
- Mikhail Khovanov
- Jeong Han Kim
- Boáz Klartag
- Jon Kleinberg
- Bruce Kleiner
- Robert V. Kohn
- Sergei Konyagin
- Bryna Kra
- Steven Lalley
- François Lalonde
- Gérard Laumon
- Claude Le Bris
- Patrice Le Calvez
- Yves Le Jan
- Peng Yee Lee
- Randall J. LeVeque
- David Levermore
- Elon Lindenstrauss
- Xiaobo Liu
- Tomasz Łuczak
- Toshiki Mabuchi
- Yvon Maday
- Ib Madsen
- Jean-Michel Maillet
- Marcos Marito
- Peter McCullagh
- Philippe Michel
- Grigory Mikhalkin
- William Minicozzi II
- Yair Minsky
- Nicolas Monod
- Fabien Morel
- Bienvenido Nebres
- Itay Neeman
- Arkadi Nemirovski
- Ngô Bảo Châu
- Wiesława Nizioł
- Martin Nowak
- David Nualart
- Yong-Geun Oh
- Andrei Okounkov
- Kaoru Ono
- E.M. Opdam
- Konrad Osterwalder
- Narutaka Ozawa
- Peter Ozsváth
- Dominique Picard
- Sorin Popa
- Mario Pulvirenti
- Alfio Quarteroni
- Anthony Ralston
- Michael Rathjen
- Omer Reingold
- Igor Rodnianski
- Mikael Rørdam
- Antonio Ros
- Linda Preiss Rothschild
- Tim Roughgarden
- Raphaël Rouquier
- Ronitt Rubinfeld
- Imre Z. Ruzsa
- Francisco Santos
- Mark Sapir
- Ovidiu Savin
- Thomas Scanlon
- William Schmidt
- Peter Schneider
- Oded Schramm
- Christoph Schweigert
- Akos Seress
- Sylvia Serfaty
- Yehuda Shalom
- Michael Shub
- Alan Siegel
- Christopher Skinner
- Stanislav Smirnov
- Agata Smoktunowicz
- Avraham Soffer
- David Soudry
- Birgit Speh
- T. A. Springer
- Olof Staffans
- Richard P. Stanley
- Emil Straube
- Endre Süli
- Zoltán Szabó
- Stanisław Szarek
- Anders Szepessy
- Terence Tao
- Vladimir Temlyakov
- Tomohide Terasoma
- Chuu-Lian Terng
- Robin Thomas
- Simon Thomas
- Xavier Tolsa
- Luca Trevisan
- Neil Trudinger
- Yuri Tschinkel
- Eric Urban
- Juan Luis Vázquez
- Arjan Van der Schaft
- Vinayak Vatsal
- Luis Vega
- Juan J. L. Velázquez
- Michèle Vergne
- Cédric Villani
- Karen Vogtmann
- Wendelin Werner
- Paul Wiegmann
- Avi Wigderson
- Burkhard Wilking
- Jaroslaw Wlodarczyk
- Hung-Hsi Wu
- Guoliang Yu
- Anton Zorich
- Enrique Zuazua

=== 2010, Hyderabad ===
- Jill Adler
- Dorit Aharonov
- David Aldous
- Marie-Claude Arnaud
- Denis Auroux
- Artur Avila
- Peter Bürgisser
- Ellen Baake
- Ramachandran Balasubramanian
- Paul Balmer
- Prakash Belkale
- Itai Benjamini
- David J Benson
- Patrick Bernard
- Louis Billera
- Alexei Borodin
- Arup Bose
- Christophe Breuil
- Xavier Buff
- Nicolas Burq
- Probal Chaudhuri
- Shuxing Chen
- Chong-Qing Cheng
- Arnaud Chéritat
- Bernardo Cockburn
- Fernando Codá Marques
- Henry Cohn
- Gonzalo Contreras
- Jean-Michel Coron
- Kevin Costello
- Marianna Csörnyei
- E.N. Dancer
- Camillo De Lellis
- Manuel del Pino
- Freddy Delbaen
- Frank den Hollander
- Nils Dencker
- Irit Dinur
- Cynthia Dwork
- Manfred Einsiedler
- Anna Erschler
- Alex Eskin
- Steven Neil Evans
- Isabel Fernández
- Sergey Fomin
- Hélène Frankowska
- Jixiang Fu
- Hillel Furstenberg
- Nicola Fusco
- David Gabai
- Damien Gaboriau
- Sara van de Geer
- William Goldman
- Iain Gordon
- Ralph Greenberg
- Jesper Grodal
- Venkatesan Guruswami
- Larry Guth
- Christopher Hacon
- Ursula Hamenstädt
- Roger Heath-Brown
- Thomas J.R. Hughes
- Michael Hutchings
- Daniel Huybrechts
- Alexander R. Its
- Sergei Ivanov
- Satoru Iwata
- Masaki Izumi
- Lech Tadeusz Januszkiewicz
- Peter Jones
- Dmitry Kaledin
- Anton Kapustin
- Nikita Karpenko
- Kiran Kedlaya
- Carlos Kenig
- Chandrashekhar Khare
- Subhash Khot
- Mark Kisin
- Tinne Hoff Kjeldsen
- Pekka Koskela
- Arno Kuijlaars
- Shrawan Kumar
- Karl Kunisch
- Antti Kupiainen
- Wolfgang Lück
- Marc Lackenby
- Sergey Lando
- Erez Lapid
- Yoram Last
- Bernard Leclerc
- Chiu-Chu Melissa Liu
- Ivan Losev
- Jacob Lurie
- Xiaonan Ma
- Philip K. Maini
- Matilde Marcolli
- Peter A. Markowich
- Gaven Martin
- Vieri Mastropietro
- Brendan McKay
- James McKernan
- Pablo Mira
- Maryam Mirzakhani
- Justin Tatch Moore
- Sophie Morel
- Alexander Nabutovsky
- Nikolai Nadirashvili
- Assaf Naor
- Fedor Nazarov
- Jaroslav Nešetřil
- Yurii Nesterov
- Claudia Neuhauser
- Ngô Bảo Châu
- Andre Nies
- Ricardo Horatio Nochetto
- Hee Oh
- Stanley Osher
- Frank Pacard
- Raman Parimala
- Jongil Park
- Pablo A. Parrilo
- A.N. Parshin
- Mihai Paun
- Peng Shige
- Ya'acov Peterzil
- Kim Plofker
- Jeremy Quastel
- Eric Rains
- Zinovy Reichstein
- Idun Reiten
- Nicolai Reshetikhin
- Oliver Riordan
- Federico Rodriguez Hertz
- Mark Rudelson
- Shuji Saito
- Takeshi Saito
- Omri Sarig
- Norbert Schappacher
- Richard Schoen
- Frank-Olaf Schreyer
- Christof Schuette
- Gregory Seregin
- Nimish A. Shah
- Qi-Man Shao
- Alexander Shapiro
- Scott Sheffield
- Zuowei Shen
- Dimitri Shlyakhtenko
- Alexander Shnirelman
- Mikhail Sodin
- Kannan Soundararajan
- Daniel Spielman
- Herbert Spohn
- Vasudevan Srinivas
- Sergei Starchenko
- András Stipsicz
- Catharina Stroppel
- Benny Sudakov
- Suresh Venapally
- Richard Thomas
- Tatiana Toro
- Nizar Touzi
- Dmitry Turaev
- Salil Vadhan
- Stefaan Vaes
- Benno Van Dalen
- Aad Van der Vaart
- S. R. Srinivasa Varadhan
- T. N. Venkataramana
- Akshay Venkatesh
- Roman Vershynin
- Claire Voisin
- Robert Weismantel
- Jean-Yves Welschinger
- Katrin Wendland
- Mary Wheeler
- Amie Wilkinson
- Jean-Pierre Wintenberger
- W. Hugh Woodin
- Jinchao Xu
- Zongben Xu
- Takao Yamaguchi
- Xu Zhang
- Xunyu Zhou

=== 2014, Seoul ===
- Rémi Abgrall
- Mohammed Abouzaid
- Ian Agol
- Anton Alekseev
- Nicolás Andruskiewitsch
- Konstantin Ardakov
- James Arthur
- Joseph Ayoub
- Viviane Baladi
- Weizhu Bao
- Boaz Barak
- Kai Behrend
- Mikhail Belolipetsky
- Georgia Benkart
- Yves Benoist
- Manjul Bhargava
- Olivier Biquard
- Alexei Borodin
- Andrea Braides
- Mark Braverman
- Emmanuel Breuillard
- Franco Brezzi
- Francis Brown
- Jonathan Brundan
- Annalisa Buffa
- Andrei Bulatov
- Eric Cancès
- Emmanuel Candès
- Sourav Chatterjee
- Zoé Chatzidakis
- Luigi Chierchia
- Demetrios Christodoulou
- Maria Chudnovsky
- Julia Chuzhoy
- David Conlon
- Guillermo Cortinas
- Ivan Corwin
- Sylvain Crovisier
- Mihalis Dafermos
- Panagiota Daskalopoulos
- Bertrand Duplantier
- Yalchin Efendiev
- Friedrich Eisenbrand
- Matthew Emerton
- Michael Entov
- László Erdős
- Bertrand Eynard
- Fuquan Fang
- Ilijas Farah
- Benson Farb
- Albert Fathi
- Alessio Figalli
- Vladimir Fock
- Jacob Fox
- Alan M. Frieze
- Alexander Furman
- Søren Galatius
- Isabelle Gallagher
- Wee Teck Gan
- Craig Gentry
- Anton Gerasimov
- Étienne Ghys
- Anna C. Gilbert
- Daniel Goldston
- Ben Green
- Geoffrey Grimmett
- Mark Gross
- Robert Guralnick
- Seung-Yeal Ha
- Martin Hairer
- Michael Harris
- Harald Helfgott
- Michael Hill
- Nancy Hingston
- Kengo Hirachi
- Jun-Muk Hwang
- Tuomas Hytönen
- Robert Jerrard
- Jeremy Kahn
- Seok-Jin Kang
- Martin Kassabov
- Nets Katz
- Rinat Kedem
- Olga Kharlampovich
- Bumsig Kim
- Byunghan Kim
- Alexander Kleshchev
- János Kollár
- Michael Krivelevich
- Daniela Kühn
- Takashi Kumagai
- Alexander Kuznetsov
- Izabella Łaba
- Kenneth Lange
- Monique Laurent
- Jean-François Le Gall
- Michel Ledoux
- Ki-Ahm Lee
- Adrian Lewis
- Tao Li
- Chang-Shou Lin
- François Loeser
- Russell Lyons
- Terry Lyons
- Mikhail Lyubich
- Andrea Malchiodi
- Adam W. Marcus
- Jens Marklof
- Vladimir Markovic
- Fernando Codá Marques
- Davesh Maulik
- Robert J. McCann
- Frank Merle
- Alexei Miasnikov
- John Milnor
- Maryam Mirzakhani
- Takurō Mochizuki
- Antonio Montalbán
- Carlos Gustavo Moreira
- Jean-Michel Morel
- Mircea Mustaţă
- Aaron Naber
- André Neves
- Barbara Niethammer
- Marc Noy
- Ryan O'Donnell
- Keiji Oguiso
- Grigori Olshanski
- Hinke Osinga
- Deryk Osthus
- Victor Ostrik
- Yaron Ostrover
- János Pach
- Sandrine Péché
- Benoit Perthame
- Jonathan Pila
- János Pintz
- Gabriella Pinzari
- Jill Pipher
- Mark Pollicott
- Han Qi
- Pierre Raphael
- Andrei S. Rapinchuk
- Batmanathan Dayanand Reddy
- Bertrand Rémy
- Nicolas Ressayre
- Charles Rezk
- Hans Ringström
- Luc Robbiano
- Vojtěch Rödl
- John Rognes
- Pierre Rouchon
- Zeev Rudnick
- Laure Saint-Raymond
- Tom Sanders
- Thomas Schick
- Wilhelm Schlag
- Peter Scholze
- Robert Seiringer
- Timo Seppäläinen
- Vera Serganova
- Nataša Šešum
- Samson Shatashvili
- Weixiao Shen
- Chi-Wang Shu
- Vladas Sidoravicius
- Bernd Siebert
- Reinhard Siegmund-Schultze
- Luis Silvestre
- Karen E. Smith
- Sasha Sodin
- Slawomir Solecki
- Roland Speicher
- Daniel Spielman
- Nikhil Srivastava
- Angelika Steger
- Andrew Stuart
- Jérémie Szeftel
- Gábor Székelyhidi
- László Székelyhidi
- Denis Talay
- Constantin Teleman
- Jörg Teschner
- Yukinobu Toda
- Bertrand Toën
- Peter Topping
- Dominique Tournes
- Masato Tsujii
- Alexandre Tsybakov
- Sebastian van Strien
- Michela Varagnolo
- Éric Vasserot
- András Vasy
- Mikhail Verbitsky
- Bálint Virág
- Van H. Vu
- Martin Wainwright
- Jean-Loup Waldspurger
- Juncheng Wei
- Stefan Wenger
- Ryan Williams
- Daniel Wise
- Trevor Wooley
- Sergey Yekhanin
- Cem Yıldırım
- Jiongmin Yong
- Shih-Hsien Yu
- Ya-xiang Yuan
- Umberto Zannier
- Thaleia Zariphopoulou
- Yitang Zhang
- Günter M. Ziegler
- Tamar Ziegler

=== 2018, Rio de Janeiro ===
- Dan Abramovich
- Andris Ambainis
- Luigi Ambrosio
- Nalini Anantharaman
- Fabrizio Andreatta
- Yves André
- Tomoyuki Arakawa
- Carolina Araujo
- Spiros Argyros
- Sanjeev Arora
- Matthias Aschenbrenner
- László Babai
- József Balogh
- Arthur Bartels
- Alexander Belavin
- Nicolas Bergeron
- Bo Berndtsson
- Andrea Bertozzi
- Caucher Birkar
- Christopher J. Bishop
- Jairo Bochi
- Marianna Bosch
- Sem Borst
- Sébastien Boucksom
- Paul Bourgade
- Lewis Bowen
- Peter Bühlmann
- Raimund Bürger
- Serge Cantat
- Lucia Caporaso
- Manuel Castro
- Dmitry Chelkak
- Jungkai Alfred Chen
- Meng Chen
- Ronald Coifman
- Diego Córdoba
- Pierre Degond
- Jean-Marc Delort
- Laura DeMarco
- Ciprian Demeter
- Lorenzo J. Díaz
- Simon Donaldson
- Lou van den Dries
- Qiang Du
- Hugo Duminil-Copin
- Tobias Ekholm
- Selim Esedoglu
- María J. Esteban
- Ruy Exel
- Mouhamed Moustapha Fall
- Bassam Fayad
- Laurent Fargues
- Michael Finkelberg
- Philippe Di Francesco
- Koji Fujiwara
- Vyacheslav Futorny
- Josselin Garnier
- Christof Geiß
- Tsachik Gelander
- Yoshikazu Giga
- Mike Giles
- Catherine Goldstein
- Sébastien Gouëzel
- Massimiliano Gubinelli
- Colin Guillarmou
- Paul Hacking
- Richard Haydon
- Xuhua He
- Joris van der Hoeven
- Michael Hochman
- Umberto Hryniewicz
- June Huh
- Piotr Indyk
- Adrian Ioana
- Adrian Iovita
- Osamu Iyama
- Pierre-Emmanuel Jabin
- Stephen Jackson
- Richard James
- Shi Jin
- Bill Johnson
- Bernardo Uribe Jongbloed
- Michael I. Jordan
- Gil Kalai
- Yael Tauman Kalai
- Noureddine El Karoui
- Rinat Kashaev
- Fanny Kassel
- Neeraj Kayal
- Yasuyuki Kawahigashi
- Sean Keel
- Peter Keevash
- Richard Kenyon
- Moritz Kerz
- Jong Hae Keum
- Konstantin Khanin
- Alexander Kiselev
- Jochen Koenigsmann
- Ulrich Kohlenbach
- Vladimir Koltchinskii
- Andrés Koropecki
- Raphaël Krikorian
- Peter B. Kronheimer
- Wojciech Kucharz
- Krzysztof Kurdyka
- Vincent Lafforgue
- Claudio Landim
- Matti Lassas
- Jean Bernard Lasserre
- Greg Lawler
- Elizaveta Levina
- Robert Lipshitz
- Carlangelo Liverani
- Alexander Logunov
- Helena J. Nussenzveig Lopes
- Christian Lubich
- Alexander Lubotzky
- Aleksander Madry
- Mohamed Majdoub
- Eugenia Malinnikova
- Maryanthe Malliaris
- Ciprian Manolescu
- Yvan Martel
- Nader Masmoudi
- András Mathé
- Kaisa Matomäki
- James Maynard
- Svitlana Mayboroda
- Jason P. Miller
- Siddhartha Mishra
- Mahan Mj
- Martin Möller
- Andrea Montanari
- Carlos Gustavo Moreira
- Robert Morris
- Clément Mouhot
- Tomasz Mrowka
- Ritabrata Munshi
- Emmy Murphy
- Assaf Naor
- Meysam Nassiri
- Sonia Natale
- Andrés Navas
- András Némethi
- Stéphane Nonnenmacher
- Andrei Okounkov
- Denis Osin
- Igor Pak
- Rahul Pandharipande
- Ivan Panin
- Georgios Pappas
- John Pardon
- Byeong Park
- Stefanie Petermichl
- Mamokgethi Phakeng
- Guido De Philippis
- Vincent Pilloni
- Jan von Plato
- Alexei Poltoratski
- Bjorn Poonen
- Mihnea Popa
- Alexander Postnikov
- Rafael Potrie
- Dipendra Prasad
- Feliks Przytycki
- Luis Radford
- Maksym Radziwill
- Prasad Raghavendra
- Alan Reid
- Benjamin Rossman
- Tatiana Roque
- David E. Rowe
- Claudia Sagastizábal
- Pedro Salomão
- Wojciech Samotij
- Sucharit Sarkar
- Olivier Schiffmann
- Benjamin Schlein
- Peter Scholze
- Sylvia Serfaty
- Mariya Shcherbina
- Amit Singer
- Allan Sly
- Ivan Smith
- David Steurer
- Song Sun
- Balázs Szegedy
- Yūji Tachikawa
- Tao Tang
- Gábor Tardos
- Jonathan Taylor
- Andreas Thom
- Rekha R. Thomas
- Jack Thorne
- Dinh Tien-Cuong
- Pham Huu Tiep
- Philippe Toint
- Fabio Toninelli
- Anna-Karin Tornberg
- Bálint Tóth
- Emmanuel Trélat
- Jacob Tsimerman
- Virginia Vassilevska Williams
- Akshay Venkatesh
- Maryna Viazovska
- Eva Viehmann
- Miguel Walsh
- Simone Warzel
- Anna Wienhard
- Geordie Williamson
- Thomas Willwacher
- Wilhelm Winter
- Barbara Wohlmuth
- Nick Wormald
- Chenyang Xu
- Jiangong You
- Lai-Sang Young
- Zhiwei Yun
- Pingwen Zhang
- Wei Zhang

=== 2022, virtual ===
- Miklós Abert
- Mina Aganagić
- Nikolai Andreev
- Federico Ardila
- Aravind Asok
- Francis Bach
- Jinho Baik
- Maria-Florina Balcan
- Keith Ball
- Richard Bamler
- Nikhil Bansal
- Gang Bao
- June Barrow-Green
- Roland Bauerschmidt
- Arend Bayer
- Jacob Bedrossian
- Marsha Berger
- Robert Berman
- Mladen Bestvina
- Raphaël Beuzart-Plessis
- Bhargav Bhatt
- Gai Binyamini
- Thierry Bodineau
- Julia Böttcher
- Mark Braverman
- Aaron Brown
- Regina S. Burachik
- Martin Burger
- Kevin Buzzard
- Danny Calegari
- Frank Calegari
- Pierre-Emmanuel Caprace
- Ana Caraiani
- Pierre Cardaliaguet
- Coralia Cartis
- Jon Chaika
- Jennifer Tour Chayes
- Kai Cieliebak
- Tobias Colding
- Benoit Collins
- Yu Hong Dai
- Samit Dasgupta
- Mikael de la Salle
- Camillo De Lellis
- Francois Delarue
- Mark Demers
- Jian Ding
- Natasha Dobrinen
- Bin Dong
- Xiumin Du
- Julien Dubedat
- Romain Dujardin
- Hugo Duminil-Copin
- Cynthia Dwork
- Semyon Dyatlov
- Weinan E
- Alexander Efimov
- Ronen Eldan
- Alison Etheridge
- Barbara Fantechi
- Jean Fasel
- Evgeny Feigin
- David Fisher
- Irene Fonseca
- Rupert Frank
- Ehud Friedgut
- Tadahisa Funaki
- Ofer Gabber
- Alexander Gamburd
- Craig B. Gentry
- Penka Georgieva
- Alessandro Guiliani
- Patricia Gonçalves
- Georges Gonthier
- Clara Grima Ruiz
- Alice Guionnet
- Neena Gupta
- Larry Guth
- Ewain Gwynne
- Philipp Habegger
- Matthew Hastings
- Tamás Hausel
- Jan S. Hesthaven
- Nicholas J. Higham
- Peter Hintz
- Gustav Holzegel
- Jennifer Hom
- Cyril Houdayer
- June Huh
- Atsushi Ichino
- Annette Imhausen
- Alexandru D. Ionescu
- Hiroshi Iritani
- Stefanie Jegelka
- Svetlana Jitomirskaya
- Mahesh Kakde
- Tasho Kaletha
- Joel Kamnitzer
- Hyeonbae Kang
- Syu Kato
- Tali Kaufman
- David Kazhdan
- Bruce Kleiner
- Bruno Klinger
- Allen Knutson
- Zico Kolter
- Dimitris Koukoulopoulos
- Karol Kozlowski
- Igor Krichever
- Gitta Kutyniok
- Alexander Kuznetsov
- Hubert Lacoin
- Michael J. Larsen
- Mariusz Lemańczyk
- Oleg Lepski
- Marc Levine
- Mathieu Lewin
- Chi Li
- Huijia (Rachel) Lin
- Gang Liu
- Yi Liu
- David Loeffler
- Michael Loss
- Qi Lu
- Gabor Lugosi
- Jonathan Luk
- Emanuele Macrì
- Kathryn Mann
- Andrew Marks
- James A. Maynard
- Mark Mclean
- Sylvie Méléard
- Roman Mikhailov
- Amir Mohammadi
- Elchanan Mossel
- Kenji Nakanishi
- Alexander I. Nazarov
- Amnon Neeman
- Jelani Nelson
- Richard Nickl
- Thomas Nikolaus
- Sergey Norin
- Isabella Novik
- Dmitry Novikov
- Yoshiko Ogata
- Asuman Özdağlar
- Dmitry Panchenko
- Irena Peeva
- Galina Perelman
- Lillian Pierce
- Aaron Pixton
- Malabika Pramanik
- Frans Pretorius
- Michela Procesi
- Yuri Prokhorov
- Kavita Ramanan
- Krishnamurthi Ramasubramanian
- Oscar Randal-Williams
- Jacob Rasmussen
- Oded Regev
- Shmuel Safra
- Amit Sahai
- Laure Saint-Raymond
- Yiannis Sakellaridis
- Laurent Saloff-Coste
- Mathias Schacht
- Gideon Schechtman
- Bernhard Schölkopf
- Richard Schwartz
- Alexander Scott
- Anna Sfard
- Peng Shan
- Asaf Shapira
- Scott Sheffield
- Sug Woo Shin
- Pablo Shmerkin
- David Silver
- Joseph Silverman
- Charles Smart
- Jan Philip Solovej
- Kannan Soundararajan
- Catharina Stroppel
- Bernd Sturmfels
- Binyong Sun
- Ola Svensson
- Iskander Taimanov
- Gabriella Tarantello
- Ye Tian
- Konstantin Tikhomirov
- Marius Tucsnak
- Corinna Ulcigrai
- Michel van den Bergh
- Eric Vanden-Eijnden
- Peter P. Vazirani
- Maryna Viazovska
- Vlad Vicol
- Thomas Vidick
- Marie-France Vignéras
- Nathalie Wahl
- Guozhen Wang
- Lu Wang
- Weiqiang Wang
- Rachel Ward
- Barak Weiss
- Stuart White
- Avi Wigderson
- Lauren Williams
- George Willis
- Olivier Wittenberg
- Melanie Wood
- Zhouli Xu
- Lexing Ying
- Keita Yokoyama
- Robert J Young
- Bin Yu
- Sarah Zerbes
- Cun Hui Zhang
- Zhifei Zhang
- Tianyi Zheng
- Xin Zhou
- Chen-Bo Zhu
- Xiaohua Zhu
- Xinwen Zhu
- Dmitriy Zhuk
- Peter Zograf

== Most invited ==
This list inventories the mathematicians who were the most invited to speak to an ICM.

Rank	Name	#	Years	Nationality
1	Jacques Hadamard	9	1897, 1900, 1904, 1908, 1912, 1920, 1928, 1932, 1950	France
2	Émile Borel	7	1897, 1900, 1904, 1908, 1912, 1928, 1936	France
2	Jules Drach	7	1900, 1912, 1920, 1924, 1928, 1932, 1936	France
4	Elie Cartan	6	1900, 1920, 1924, 1928, 1932, 1936	France
4	Gino Loria	6	1897, 1904, 1908, 1912, 1928, 1932	Italy
4	Vito Volterra	6	1900, 1904, 1908, 1912, 1920, 1928	Italy
7	Henri Fehr	5	1904, 1908, 1912, 1924, 1932	Switzerland
7	Rudolf Fueter	5	1920, 1924, 1928, 1932, 1936	Switzerland
7	Yuri Manin	5	1966, 1970, 1978, 1986, 1990	Russia Germany
7	Mihailo Petrović	5	1908, 1912, 1924, 1928, 1932	Serbia
7	Cyparissos Stephanos	5	1897, 1900, 1904, 1908, 1912	Greece
7	Carl Størmer	5	1908, 1920, 1924, 1932, 1936	Norway
7	Gheorghe Țițeica	5	1908, 1912, 1924, 1932, 1936	Romania
7	Stanisław Zaremba	5	1908, 1920, 1924, 1932, 1936	Poland
