= Giorgina Madìa =

Italian physicist and electrical engineer

- Born: 27 December 1904; Naples, Italy
- Occupations: Physicist and electrical engineer

Giorgina Madìa (born 27 December 1904 in Naples, Italy) was an Italian physicist and electrical engineer, specializing in electrical communications, and a member of the Italian resistance during World War II.

== Biography ==
Her parents were Ernesto and Olga Ferrari.

She worked at the National Research Council and later as a professor at the Università degli studi di Napoli. She was also a professor of physics at nautical institutes and in charge of electrical engineering in the University of Bari. Her principal area of expertise was in electromagnetism and communications. electric.

She was an invited speaker at the International Congress of Mathematicians in 1928 at Bologna, Italy, and gave a talk titled I trasformatori telefonici.

During World War II, she worked in a telephone office in Milan, where she joined the Italian resistance movement. She built and operated a radio station that sent intelligence on German troop movements to other parts of the resistance in southern Italy.

== Selected publications ==
- Madia, Giorgina. "Le forze elettromotrici nella teoria dinamica dell’elettromagnetismo." Il Nuovo Cimento (1924-1942) 4.1 (1927): 289–295.
- Madia, Giorgina. "La Teoria Dinamica Dell’elettroma-Gnetismo Nei Riguardi delle Forze Ponderomotrici." Il Nuovo Cimento (1924-1942) 5.1 (1928): 108–113.
- Madia, Giorgina. "I trasformatori telefonici." Atti del Congresso Internazionale dei Matematici: Bologna from 3 to 10 September 1928. 1929.
- Madia, Giorgina. "Le Zworykine system." Interciné, VIIe année, n ° 2, February 1935, p. 99-101.
- Madia, Giorgina. "Applicazione Della Teoria Di Cauer Ai Filtri a Scala Campbell-Zobel." (1940). Print.
- Madia, Giorgina. Elettronica. Udine: Del Bianco, 1963. Print. The Italian textbook Elettronica.
- Madia, Giorgina. Fondamenti Fisico Matematici Della Teoria Dei Semiconduttori. Roma: Dets, 1967. Print.

== External sources ==
- Beltrami, Giuliana, and Alloisio, Mirella. Volontarie della libertà: 8 settembre 1943-25 aprile 1945. Italy, Mazzota, 1981. (Volunteers of freedom September 8, 1943 - April 25, 1945)
