= Sylvia Chin-Pi Lu =

Taiwanese-American mathematician

- Born: 1928
- Died: 2014 (aged 85–86)
- Education: Pennsylvania State University (PhD)
- Scientific career
- Fields: Commutative algebra
- Workplaces: University of Colorado Denver
- Doctoral advisor: Raymond Ayoub

Sylvia Chin-Pi Lu (1928–2014) was a Taiwanese-American mathematician specializing in commutative algebra who was an invited speaker at the 1990 International Congress of Mathematicians in Kyoto. Less than 5% of ICM speakers in algebra and number theory have been women, placing Lu in a rarefied group in this "hall of fame for mathematics". Lu's most highly cited papers are on the properties of prime submodules.

== Education ==
Lu received her dissertation from The Pennsylvania State University in 1963, under the direction of Raymond Ayoub.
