= Percy John Harding =

English mathematician

Percy John Harding (15 June 1845, London – 1943?) was an English mathematician, noteworthy as an invited speaker at the International Congress of Mathematicians in 1912.

The elder son of William Harding, a surgeon in London, Percy J. Harding received his B.A. in 1869 and his M.A. in 1874 from Cambridge University. He became a lecturer at University College, London and Bedford College, London. On 1 March 1906 at Bedford College, London, he gave a talk The History and Human Side of Mathematics with lantern illustrations. Using lantern slides, he gave a talk The history and evolution of arithmetic division at the ICM at 9 PM on 22 August 1912 in Cambridge, England.
