= Max Gut =

Swiss mathematician

Max Gut (1898–1988) was a Swiss mathematician, specializing in algebraic number theory and group theory.

After completing his secondary education at the canton school in Zürich, Gut spent one semester studying law and business at the University of Geneva, but then followed his inclinations to study mathematics. He studied mathematics at the University of Zürich and ETH Zürich and then spent a year studying theoretical physics in Berlin. He received his promotion (Ph.D.) in 1924 from the University of Zürich under Rudolf Fueter. Gut received his habilitation qualification in the summer of 1929 from the University of Zürich, and was appointed there Titularprofessor in 1938.

Gut served a two-year term from 1946 to 1947 as president of the Swiss Mathematical Society. He was an Invited Speaker of the ICM in 1932 at Zürich and in 1936 at Oslo.

== Selected publications ==
- with Rudolf Fueter: Vorlesungen über die singulären Moduln und die komplexe Multiplikation der elliptischen Funktionen. Vol. 41. BG Teubner, 1927.
- "Die Zetafunktion, die Klassenzahl und die Kronecker'sche Grenzformel eines beliebigen Kreiskörpers." Commentarii Mathematici Helvetici 1, no. 1 (1929): 160-226. doi:10.1007/BF01208364
- "Über die Gradteilerzerlegung in gewissen relativ-ikosaedrischen Zahlkörpern." Commentarii Mathematici Helvetici 7, no. 1 (1934): 103-130. doi:10.1007/BF01292712
- "Weitere Untersuchungen über die Primidealzerlegung in gewissen relativ-ikosaedrischen Zahlkörpern." Commentarii Mathematici Helvetici 6, no. 1 (1934): 47-75. doi:10.1007/BF01297322
- "Über Erweiterungen von unendlichen algebraischen Zahlkörpern." Commentarii Mathematici Helvetici 9, no. 1 (1936): 136–155. doi:10.1007/BF01258182
- "Folgen von Dedekindschen Zetafunktionen." Monatshefte für Mathematik 48, no. 1 (1939): 153–160. doi:10.1007/BF01696173
- "Zur Theorie der Klassenkörper der Kreiskörper, insbesondere der Strahlklassenkörper der quadratisch imaginären Zahlkörper." Commentarii Mathematici Helvetici 15, no. 1 (1942): 81-119. doi:10.1007/BF02565635
- "Zur Theorie der Strahlklassenkörper der quadratisch reellen Zahlkörper." Commentarii Mathematici Helvetici 16, no. 1 (1943): 37–59. doi:10.1007/BF02568563
- "Zur Theorie der Normenreste einer relativ-zyklischen Erweiterung von ungeradem Primzahlgrade." Vierteljahrsschrift der Naturforschenden Gesellschaft in Zürich 91 (1946): 17–36.
- "Eulersche Zahlen und grosser Fermat’scher Satz." Commentarii Mathematici Helvetici 24, no. 1 (1950): 73-99. doi:10.1007/BF02567027
