= Clément Servais =

Belgian geometer (1862–1935)

Clément Joseph Servais (16 October 1862, Huy – 9 October 1935, Brussels) was a Belgian mathematician, specializing in geometry.

Servais attended secondary school at the Athénée royal de Huy. In 1881 he matriculated at the Normal School of Sciences of Ghent University. In 1884 he graduated there and passed the agrégation for teaching upper secondary classes. He then became a teacher in Ypres and in the following year he taught at the Athénée royal de Bruxelles but after a short time he was appointed a docent for teaching mathematical courses at the School of Civil Engineering of Ghent University. In 1886 he received his Ph.D. at Ghent University. He became in 1887 a docent, in 1890 a professor extraordinarius, and in 1894 a professor ordinarius at the Faculty of Sciences of Ghent University. In 1932 he retired there as a professor emeritus.

On 15 December 1919 he was elected to the Royal Academies for Science and the Arts of Belgium. He was an Invited Speaker of the ICM in 1924 in Toronto.

== Selected publications ==
- "Sur la courbure des biquadratiques gauches de première espèce." Nouvelles annales de mathématiques: journal des candidats aux écoles polytechnique et normale 11 (1911): 289–302.
- "Extension des théorèmes de Frégier aux courbes et aux surfaces algébriques." Nouvelles annales de mathématiques: journal des candidats aux écoles polytechnique et normale 12 (1912): 145–156.
- "Sur les axes de l'indicatrice et les centres de courbure principaux en un point d'une surface du second ordre." Nouvelles annales de mathématiques: journal des candidats aux écoles polytechnique et normale 14 (1914): 193–218.
- "Sur les surfaces tétraédrales symétriques." Nouvelles annales de mathématiques: journal des candidats aux écoles polytechnique et normale 19 (1919): 456–468.
- "Un théorème général sur les complexes." Nouvelles annales de mathématiques: journal des candidats aux écoles polytechnique et normale 20 (1920): 347–355.

== Bibliography ==
- Lembrechts, A. "Clément Servais (1862–1935)" (PDF). ugent.be. (list of publications by C. Servais)
