= Wolfgang Sternberg =

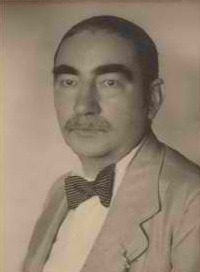
Sternberg in 1935

Wolfgang Sternberg (1887–1953) was a German-American mathematician.

He completed his doctoral dissertation in 1912 at the University of Breslau and his habilitation in 1920 at Heidelberg University.

He was a professor at Heidelberg from 1920 to 1927 and in Breslau from 1927 to 1933.

In 1935 Sternberg was dismissed by the non-Aryan laws from his post at Breslau He briefly went to Palestine. However, in Palestine he was unhappy, due to various factors, such as "Jewish nationalism", lack of knowledge of Hebrew, and bad climate. He worked at the Hebrew University without remuneration, and actively sought possibilities to emigrate to other places, including the United States and the Soviet Union. He wrote to Richard Courant in 1936:

The value of [Palestinian] citizenship is, however, dubious. It is also dependent on whether the rather unpredictable English policies remain friendly to the Jews or not. I admit that an American citizenship would be much preferable to me.

Eventually, Sternberg left Palestine for Prague. From 1935 to 1939, he was a member of the faculty of the Prague German University.

In 1939 he managed to reach the United States where he had great difficulty finding employment despite help from Courant. He was living in New York City in 1942. Eventually, he went through a number of temporary jobs at the Cornell University and other places, until his early retirement in 1948.

Sternberg made contributions to potential theory, integral equations, and probability theory. Sternberg's two volume book Potentialtheorie I and Potentialtheorie II was published by Walter de Gruyter. Later he published The Theory of Potential and Spherical Harmonics with Turner Smith. Jaroslav Lukeš, Ivan Netuka, and Jiří Veselý describe his "well-known work on the Perron method for the heat equation, "Über die Gleichung der Wärmeleitung" as "often quoted in treatises on modern potential theory."
