= Florent Bureau =

Belgian mathematician

Florent-Joseph Bureau (1906–1999) was a Belgian mathematician born in Jemeppe-sur-Sambre. He was a professor at the Faculty of Sciences of the University of Liège. He worked on algebraic and differential geometry and the theory of analytical functions. In 1952, he was awarded the Francqui Prize on Exact Sciences.
