= Wojciech Kucharz =

Polish mathematician

Prof. dr. hab. Wojciech Janusz Kucharz (born January 2, 1952) is a Polish mathematician, full professor at the Department of Real Functions of the Institute of Mathematics, Faculty of Mathematics and Computer Science of the Jagiellonian University.

== Awards ==
- 2022: Knight's Cross of the Order of Polonia Restituta
- 2020: Nicolaus Copernicus Scientific Award
- 2020: Jagiellonian Laurel Award
- 2018: Stefan Banach Award
