= Albert Quiquet =

Albert Quiquet (1862 – 22 August 1934) was a French actuary and statistician, perhaps best known for his role in transcribing and editing the lectures given by Henri Poincaré and published under the title Calcul des probabilités.

Quiquet graduated from the École Normale Supérieure in 1883. He became in 1886 an actuary at one of the largest French insurance companies, La Nationale Compagnie d'Assurances sur la vie, and later became the chief actuary there, a position he held for nearly 30 years. He became a full member of the Institute of Actuaries of France in 1893.

He published many papers in the journal of the Institute of Actuaries of France and in several other statistical and mathematical journals. He participated in 1895 in the first International Congress of Actuaries and in the subsequent congresses.

Quiquet was an Invited Speaker of the ICM in 1908 at Rome, in 1912 at Cambridge UK, and in 1928 at Bologna.
