= Alexander Dranishnikov =

Russian-American mathematician

Alexander Nikolaevich Dranishnikov (Александр Николаевич Дранишников; born 5 February 1958) is a Russian-American mathematician, focusing in geometry and topology, currently a distinguished professor at the University of Florida. In 1998 he was an Invited Speaker at the International Congress of Mathematicians in Berlin. In 2012 he became one of the inaugural fellows of the American Mathematical Society.
