= Johannes Finsterbusch =

German mathematician

Johannes F. Finsterbusch (1 June 1855, Colditz – 1921) was a German mathematician, known for his work on projective geometry.

Finsterbusch studied from 1873 to 1880 at Dresden and Leipzig. From 1882 to 1900 he taught as a schoolmaster (Oberlehrer) at the Realschule in Werdau. From 1900 he taught as a professor (Gymnasialprofessor) at the Gymnasium in Zwickau. He was an Invited Speaker of the ICM in 1904 at Heidelberg, in 1908 at Rome, and in 1912 at Cambridge UK.

In 1889 he married Marie Emma Sophie Gräszer; the marriage produced five children.
