= Enrico Volterra =

Italian engineer (1905–1973)

Enrico Volterra (11 June 1905, Rome – 29 June 1973) was an Italian engineer.

== Biography ==
A son of the famous mathematician Vito Volterra, Enrico Volterra received in 1928 his degree in civil engineering from the Sapienza University of Rome and, in the same year, his professional qualification (abilitazione) in bridges and roads from the Polytechnic School of Engineering in Naples. He became in Rome an academic assistant to the Chair of Marine Construction and then in Paris a researcher in photoelastic methods at the École Nationale des Ponts et Chausées, before returning in Rome to start work as a civil engineer.

In 1932 he was an Invited Speaker at the ICM in Zürich.

In January 1933, he obtained the libera docenza in the science of structures from the University of Rome. Awarded an Italian government fellowship for study abroad, Volterra spent 1933 in Switzerland, where he worked in Professor Mirko Ros's materials testing laboratory at the Swiss Federal Institute of Technology (ETH) in Zurich, doing research on concrete and reinforced concrete. He also collaborated with Ros that year testing the structures for the new Palace of Nations in Geneva, the headquarters of the League of Nations. Following his return to Rome in January 1934, Volterra became Levi-Civita's assistant. He also served as lecturer in graphical statics (1934-1938) and rational mechanics (1936-1938) for engineering students at Rome, and lectured on structures (1937-1938) as well in the university's school of architecture. Volterra remained active as a project engineer during these years, working on road construction in Sicily and various Egyptian construction projects in Alexandria.

After the Mussolini regime promulgated the 1938 racial laws, which prohibited Jews from teaching, Enrico lost his position. The following year, he left Italy for Cambridge, England, where he earned a PhD in engineering. When Italy entered World War II on the German side, Enrico was imprisoned in an internment camp on the Isle of Man, where he learned of his father's death. Released through the efforts of well-placed British scientists notably Archibald V. Hill, Enrico spent the rest of the war years in England, working on plastic and rubber materials under G. I. Taylor and for the British Admiralty.

In 1948 he joined the faculty of the Illinois Institute of Technology in Chicago, then the Rensselaer Polytechnic Institute in Troy, New York, and in 1957 the University of Texas at Austin.

Professor Volterra specialized in the theory of vibrations, strength of materials, the mathematical theory of elasticity, and experimental stress analysis. He held a National Science Foundation grant to study vibrations of curved bars. He was also awarded a Fulbright fellowship, which took him to the Technion-Israel Institute of Technology to lecture. Professor Volterra published nearly 100 papers.

He married and was the father of two daughters.

== Selected publications ==
=== Articles ===
- Volterra, Enrico (1961). "Second approximation of method of internal constraints and its applications". International Journal of Mechanical Sciences. 3 (1): 47–67. doi:10.1016/0020-7403(61)90038-8.
- with T.-C. Chang: Chang, Tish-Chun; Volterra, Enrico (1969). "Upper and lower bounds for frequencies of elastic arcs". The Journal of the Acoustical Society of America. 46 (5B): 1165–1174. Bibcode:1969ASAJ...46.1165C. doi:10.1121/1.1911837.

=== Books ===
- with E. C. Zachmanoglou: Dynamics of Vibrations. C. E. Merrill Books. 1965.
- with J. H. Gaines: Advanced Strength of Materials. Prentice-Hall. 1971.
