= Huijia (Rachel) Lin =

Chinese-American cryptographer

Huijia (Rachel) Lin is a Chinese-American computer scientist whose research in cryptography includes work on indistinguishability obfuscation and non-interactive zero-knowledge proofs. She is an associate professor and Paul G. Allen Career Development Professor in the Paul G. Allen School of Computer Science & Engineering at the University of Washington.

== Education and career ==
Lin has a bachelor's degree in computer science from Zhejiang University in China, and a Ph.D. from Cornell University, completed in 2011. Her dissertation, Concurrent Security, was supervised by Rafael Pass.

After postdoctoral research at the Massachusetts Institute of Technology and Boston University, she became an assistant professor at the University of California, Santa Barbara in 2013. She took her present position at the University of Washington in 2018.

== Recognition ==
Several of Lin's conference papers have won best paper awards. She was an invited speaker at the 2022 (virtual) International Congress of Mathematicians.
