= Paul Drumaux =

Belgian engineer (1883–1954)

Paul Drumaux (1883, in Hasselt – 1954, in Brussels) was a Belgian engineer who wrote on electricity, electrical engineering, and related subjects.

Paul Drumaux received from the University of Liège a degree in mining engineering in 1905 and a degree in electrical engineering in 1908. In 1907 Drumaxu became a supervising engineer at Belgium's PTT (Post, Telegraaf, Telefonie) and in 1919 a docent at Ghent University. He was an Invited Speaker of the ICM in 1932 in Zurich and in 1936 in Oslo.

His brother Leon Drumaux (1879–1942) became director-general of the Ministry of Agriculture of Belgium. His sister Angela Drumaux (1881–1959) was an artist who was a student of Adrien de Witte at the academy of Liège and received in 1913 the triennial prize for painting; she exhibited in 1952 at the Hasseltse Galerie Artes and in 1953 at the Scherpesteen gallery.

== Selected publications ==
- La théorie corpusculaire de l’électricité. Les électrons et les ions (1911, publication awarded the Prix de la Fondations Montefiore) 166 pages
- La théléphonie à grande distance et la télephonie sans fils (1913, publication awarded the Prix de l’Association des Ingénieurs de Liège)
- Les circuits téléphonique à longue portée comparées aux lignes de transport de force (1913)
- L’évidence de la théorie d’Einstein (1923), 72 pages
- Sur l’énergie gravifique (1925)
- La théorie des quanta (1927).
