= Fernando de Helguero =

Italian mathematician (1880–1908)

Fernando de Helguero (1 November 1880, Pelago – 28 December 1908, Messina) was an Italian mathematician, statistician and pioneer of biostatistics.

Fernando de Helguero was born near Florence. He studied mathematics at the University of Rome. After receiving his licentiate degree in 1903, he taught mathematics while he studied natural sciences, biology, statistics, and biometry. He was an Invited Speaker of the ICM in Rome in April 1908. However, he died later the same year in the 1908 Messina earthquake.

His collected papers were published in 1972.

According to Adelchi Azzalini and Antonella Capitanio:

The tragic end of de Helguero's life prevented the development of his innovative ideas, and the whole formulation passed unnoticed for the rest of the 20th century. It appears that his contribution has re-emerged only in the discussion of Azzalini (2005), thanks to a personal communication of D. M. Cifarelli. ...
The formulation is distinctly one step ahead of the mainstream approach of data fitting of those years: probability distributions must not simply be devised to provide a numerical fit to observed frequencies, but they must also help to understand how the non-normal distribution has been generalized. This goal can be achieved by a formulation which relates perturbation of normality to the effect of some external mechanism.

== Selected publications ==
- De Helguero, Fernando (1904). "Sui massimi delle curve dimorfiche". Biometrika. 3 (1): 84–98. doi:10.2307/2331524. JSTOR 2331524.
- "Variazioni del numero di fiori ligulari del Bellis perennis". Bullettino dell'Orto Botanico di Napoli. 2 (1): 133–144. 1904.
- De Helguero, Fernando (1905). "Per la risoluzione delle curve dimorfiche". Biometrika. 4 (1/2): 230–231. doi:10.2307/2331538. JSTOR 2331538.
- De Helguero, Fernando (1906). "Variazione ed Omotiposi nelle Inflorescenze di Cichorium Intybus L." Biometrika. 5 (1/2): 184–189. doi:10.2307/2331658. JSTOR 2331658.
- De Helguero, Fernando (1907). "Sulla determinazione dei parahethi di alcune funzioni per mezzo dei dati sperimentali". Il Nuovo Cimento. 13 (1): 175–181. Bibcode:1907NCim...13..175D. doi:10.1007/bf02717229. S2CID 122336758.
- "Dell'influenza del gozzo sulle statistiche della statura". Atti della Società Romana di Antropologia. 14 (1): 61–69. 1908.
- De Helguero, Fernando (1909). "Sulla rappresentazione analitica delle curve statistiche". Giornale degli Economisti. Serie seconda. 38 (Anno 20): 241–265. JSTOR 23221976.
