= Paul Flamant =

French mathematician

Paul Flamant (1892–1940) was a French mathematician, known as the transcriber and editor of Gaston Julia's lectures published in the important monograph Leçons sur les Fonctions Uniformes à Point Singulier Essentiel Isolé (1924). According to Joseph Ritt, "Julia's monograph is probably one of the finest in the Borel collection."

Paul Flamant matriculated in 1913 at the École Normale Supérieure (ENS) as the highest-rated student, but before graduation went to the front in World War I as a second lieutenant in the French army. He was wounded at Charleroi and taken prisoner. He spent almost four years as a prisoner-of-war, then returned to the ENS and passed his agrégation (and was the highest-rated student for that year of examinations). He received his doctorate from the University of Strasbourg in 1924.. His doctoral thesis, Sur une équation différentielle fonctionnelle linéaire (80 pp.), dealt with linear functional differential equations and was supervised at Strasbourg during his recovery from the health effects of his imprisonment. The thesis is available through the Numdam digital archive of French mathematical publications. He became a mathematics professor at the University of Strasbourg but his health was impaired for the rest of his life. At the beginning of World War II, as a captain in the reserves, he was stationed in the damp, cold bunkers of the Maginot Line. His health deteriorated and he soon died.

He was an Invited Speaker of the ICM in 1928 in Bologna and in 1936 in Oslo.

== Selected publications ==
- "Agrégation des sciences mathématiques (session de 1924)." Nouvelles annales de mathématiques : journal des candidats aux écoles polytechnique et normale, Série 5 : Volume 3 (1924): 342–343.
- "Complément à la note de MH Hildebrandt." Annales de la Société Polonaise de Mathématique T. 5 (1926) (1927).
- "Le développement d’une transmutation linéaire par rapport à la différentiation finie." Rendiconti del Circolo Matematico di Palermo (1884-1940) Volume 54, no. 1 (1930): 371–413. doi:10.1007/BF03021202
