= Anders Szepessy =

Swedish mathematician

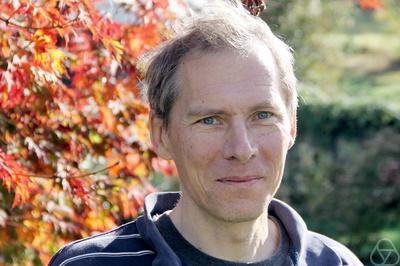
Anders Szepessy

Anders Szepessy (born 1960) is a Swedish mathematician.

Szepessy received his PhD in 1989 from Chalmers University of Technology with thesis Convergence of the streamline diffusion finite element method for conservation laws under the supervision of Claes Johnson. Szepessy is now a professor of mathematics and numerical analysis at KTH Royal Institute of Technology.

His research area is applied mathematics, especially partial differential equations.

Szepessy was an invited speaker at the International Congress of Mathematicians in 2006 in Madrid. He was elected a member of the Royal Swedish Academy of Sciences in 2007.

== Selected publications ==
- Johnson, Claes; Szepessy, Anders (1987). "On the convergence of a finite element method for a nonlinear hyperbolic conservation law". Mathematics of Computation. 49 (180): 427. doi:10.1090/S0025-5718-1987-0906180-5.
- Szepessy, Anders (1989). "An existence result for scalar conservation laws using measure valued solutions". Communications in Partial Differential Equations. 14 (10): 1329–1350. doi:10.1080/03605308908820657.
- Szepessy, Anders (1989). "Measure-valued solutions of scalar conservation laws with boundary conditions". Archive for Rational Mechanics and Analysis. 107 (2): 181–193. Bibcode:1989ArRMA.107..181S. doi:10.1007/BF00286499. S2CID 120515809.
- Szepessy, Anders (1989). "Convergence of a shock-capturing streamline diffusion finite element method for a scalar conservation law in two space dimensions". Mathematics of Computation. 53 (188): 527–545. Bibcode:1989MaCom..53..527S. doi:10.1090/S0025-5718-1989-0979941-6.
- Johnson, Claes; Szepessy, Anders; Hansbo, Peter (1990). "On the convergence of shock-capturing streamline diffusion finite element methods for hyperbolic conservation laws". Mathematics of Computation. 54 (189): 107. Bibcode:1990MaCom..54..107J. doi:10.1090/S0025-5718-1990-0995210-0.
- Hansbo, Peter; Szepessy, Anders (1990). "A velocity-pressure streamline diffusion finite element method for the incompressible Navier-Stokes equations". Computer Methods in Applied Mechanics and Engineering. 84 (2): 175–192. Bibcode:1990CMAME..84..175H. doi:10.1016/0045-7825(90)90116-4.
- Szepessy, Anders; Xin, Zhouping (1993). "Nonlinear stability of viscous shock waves". Archive for Rational Mechanics and Analysis. 122 (1): 53–103. Bibcode:1993ArRMA.122...53S. doi:10.1007/BF01816555. S2CID 122130129.
- Goodman, Jonathan; Szepessy, Anders; Zumbrun, Kevin (1994). "A Remark on the Stability of Viscous Shock Waves". SIAM Journal on Mathematical Analysis. 25 (6): 1463–1467. doi:10.1137/S0036141092239648. ISSN 0036-1410.
- Johnson, Claes; Szepessy, Anders (1995). "Adaptive finite element methods for conservation laws based on a posteriori error estimates". Communications on Pure and Applied Mathematics. 48 (3): 199–234. doi:10.1002/cpa.3160480302.
- Jaffre, J.; Johnson, C.; Szepessy, A. (1995). "Convergence of the Discontinuous Galerkin Finite Element Method for Hyperbolic Conservation Laws". Mathematical Models and Methods in Applied Sciences. 05 (3): 367–386. doi:10.1142/S021820259500022X.
- Szepessy, Anders; Zumbrun, Kevin (1996). "Stability of rarefaction waves in viscous media". Archive for Rational Mechanics and Analysis. 133 (3): 249–298. doi:10.1007/BF00380894. S2CID 18558122.
- Szepessy, Anders; Tempone, Raúl; Zouraris, Georgios E. (2001). "Adaptive weak approximation of stochastic differential equations". Communications on Pure and Applied Mathematics. 54 (10): 1169–1214. doi:10.1002/cpa.10000. ISSN 0010-3640. S2CID 7182000.
