= Valery Alexeev (mathematician) =

American mathematician

Valery Alexeev (born 1964) is an American mathematician who is currently the David C. Barrow Professor at University of Georgia, and an Elected Fellow of the American Mathematical Society. He received his PhD from Lomonosov Moscow State University in 1990.
