= John Arndt Eiesland =

Norwegian-American mathematician

Johan "John" Arndt Eiesland (27 January 1867, Ny-Hellesund, Norway – 11 March 1950, Morgantown, West Virginia) was a Norwegian-American mathematician, specializing in differential geometry.

Eiesland immigrated to the US in 1888 after completing his secondary education in Christiansand. He received his bachelor's degree from the University of South Dakota in 1891. He was a mathematics professor from 1895 to 1903 at Thiel College in Pennsylvania. On a leave of absence, he studied mathematics as a Johns Hopkins Scholar (1897–1898) at Johns Hopkins University, where he received his Ph.D. in 1898. From 1903 to 1907 he was a mathematics instructor at the United States Naval Academy. In 1907 he became a professor of mathematics at West Virginia University and the chair of the mathematics department from 1907 to 1938, when he retired as professor emeritus.

Eiesland was elected a Fellow of the American Association for the Advancement of Science in 1903. He was an Invited Speaker of the ICM in 1924 in Toronto.

He married in 1904.

At West Virginia University, Eiesland Hall is named in his honor, and in 1994 his heirs established the John Arndt Eiesland Visiting Professorship of Mathematics.

== Selected publications ==
- On Nullsystems in space of five dimensions and their relation to ordinary space. American Journal of Mathematics 26, no. 2 (1904): 103–148.
- On a certain system of conjugate lines on a surface connected with Euler's transformation. Trans. Amer. Math. Soc. 6 (1905) 450–471. doi:10.1090/S0002-9947-1905-1500721-9
- On a certain class of algebraic translation-surfaces. American Journal of Mathematics 29, no. 4 (1907): 363–386.
- On Translation-Surfaces Connected with a Unicursal Quartic. American Journal of Mathematics 30, no. 2 (1908): 170–208.
- On minimal lines and congruences in four-dimensional space. Trans. Amer. Math. Soc. 12 (1911) 403–428. doi:10.1090/S0002-9947-1911-1500898-8
- The group of motions of an Einstein space. Trans. Amer. Math. Soc. 27 (1925), 213–245. doi:10.1090/S0002-9947-1925-1501308-7
- The ruled V^{4}_{4} in S_{5} associated with a Schläfli hexad. Trans. Amer. Math. Soc. 36 (1934) 315–326. doi:10.1090/S0002-9947-1934-1501745-6
