= Shih-Hsien Yu =

Taiwanese mathematician

Shih-Hsien Yu is a Taiwanese mathematician at the National University of Singapore (NUS). He is known for his work on hyperbolic conservation laws and kinetic equations.

== Biography ==
Yu attended Taichung first senior high School. He did his undergraduate studies and master courses at National Taiwan University, followed by graduate studies at Stanford University, working under Tai-Ping Liu and obtaining his PhD in 1994. He was subsequently a postdoc fellow at University of Minnesota (1994–1995), faculty member at University of California, Los Angeles (1995–1999), Osaka University (1999–2000), City University of Hong Kong (2000–2007), before moving to the National University of Singapore in 2007.

== Contributions ==
With Tai-Ping Liu, Yu has solved several basic problems in conservation laws and kinetic equations such as the existence of discrete shock wave for Lax-Friedrichs scheme, and the positive-valued function property of the Boltzmann shock profile, pointwise structure of the Green’s functions for linearized Boltzmann equation, and invariant manifolds for stationary Boltzmann flows.

== Selected works ==
1. Liu, Tai-Ping; Yu, Shih-Hsien (1999). "Continuum shock profiles for discrete conservation laws II: Stability". Communications on Pure and Applied Mathematics. 52 (9). Wiley: 1047–1073. doi:10.1002/(sici)1097-0312(199909)52:9<1047::aid-cpa1>3.0.co;2-4. ISSN 0010-3640.
2. Liu, Tai-Ping; Yu, Shih-Hsien (1 March 2004). "Boltzmann Equation: Micro-Macro Decompositions and Positivity of Shock Profiles". Communications in Mathematical Physics. 246 (1). Springer Science and Business Media LLC: 133–179. Bibcode:2004CMaPh.246..133L. doi:10.1007/s00220-003-1030-2. ISSN 0010-3616. S2CID 120673062.
3. Liu, Tai-Ping; Yu, Shih-Hsien (2004). "The Green's function and large-time behavior of solutions for the one-dimensional Boltzmann equation". Communications on Pure and Applied Mathematics. 57 (12). Wiley: 1543–1608. doi:10.1002/cpa.20011. ISSN 0010-3640. S2CID 122820345.
4. Yu, Shih-Hsien (24 May 2010). "Nonlinear wave propagations over a Boltzmann shock profile". Journal of the American Mathematical Society. 23 (4). American Mathematical Society (AMS): 1041–1118. doi:10.1090/s0894-0347-2010-00671-6. ISSN 0894-0347.
5. Liu, Tai-Ping; Yu, Shih-Hsien (17 May 2013). "Invariant Manifolds for Steady Boltzmann Flows and Applications". Archive for Rational Mechanics and Analysis. 209 (3). Springer Science and Business Media LLC: 869–997. Bibcode:2013ArRMA.209..869L. doi:10.1007/s00205-013-0640-x. ISSN 0003-9527. S2CID 253717347.

== Awards and honors ==
Yu was an invited speaker at the International Congress of Mathematicians(ICM) in 2014 (Partial Differential Equations section).
