= Marino Pannelli =

Italian mathematician

Marino Pannelli (16 November 1855, Macerata – 16 April 1934, Macerata) was an Italian mathematician, specializing in algebraic geometry.

== Education and career ==
After receiving his laurea from the Sapienza University of Rome, Pannelli became at the University of Pavia a libero docente of projective geometry and from 1893 to 1899 a libero docente of descriptive geometry. Later he taught at the Istituto Tecnico di Roma and held academic positions there. Francesco Severi stated that Pannelli was one of the best of those Italian algebraic geometers who were not appointed to a professorial chair. Some of Pannelli's publications in algebraic geometry received the ministerial prize of the Accademia dei Lincei.

In 1908 he was an Invited Speaker of the ICM in Rome.

== Selected publications ==
- "Sulla costruzione della superficie del 3. o ordine individuata da 19 punti." Annali di Matematica Pura ed Applicata (1867–1897) 22, no. 1 (1894): 237–260.
- "Sulla riduzione delle singolarità di una superficie algebrica per mezzo di trasformazioni birazionali dello spazio." Annali di Matematica Pura ed Applicata (1867–1897) 25, no. 1 (1897): 67–138.
- "Sui sistemi lineari triplamente infiniti di curve tracciati sopra una superficie algebrica." Rendiconti del Circolo Matematico di Palermo (1884–1940) 20, no. 1 (1905): 34–48.
- "Sulle reti di superficie algebriche." Rendiconti del Circolo Matematico di Palermo (1884–1940) 20, no. 1 (1905): 160–172.
- "Sopra un carattere di una varieté algebrica a tre dimensioni." Rendiconti del Circolo Matematico di Palermo (1884–1940) 32, no. 1 (1911): 1–47.
- "Sul numero delle superficie di un fascio dotate di un punto doppio." Rendiconti del Circolo Matematico di Palermo (1884–1940) 36, no. 1 (1913): 345–367.
