= Richard F. Bass =

American mathematician

Richard Franklin Bass is an American mathematician, the Board of Trustees Distinguished Professor Emeritus of Mathematics at the University of Connecticut. He is known for his work in probability theory.

Bass earned his Ph.D. from the University of California, Berkeley in 1977 under the supervision of Pressley Millar. He taught at the University of Washington before moving to Connecticut.

Bass is a fellow of the Institute of Mathematical Statistics. In 2012 he became a fellow of the American Mathematical Society.

== Books ==
Bass is the author of:

- Probabilistic Techniques in Analysis (Springer, 1995)
- Diffusions and Elliptic Operators (Springer, 1997)
- Stochastic Processes (Cambridge University Press, 2011)
- Bass, Richard Franklin (2013) [2011]. Real analysis for graduate students (Second ed.). Createspace Independent Publishing. ISBN 978-1-4818-6914-0.
