= Francesco Sbrana =

Italian mathematician (1891–1958)

Francesco Sbrana (10 June 1891, Portoferraio, Elba – 23 October 1958, Genoa) was an Italian applied mathematician and mathematical physicist.

Sbrana received in 1914 his laurea from the University of Genova, where he became an assistant in rational mechanics to Orazio Tedone. After Tedone's death in 1922, Sbrana taught the academic courses formerly taught by Tedone and in 1931 became the successor to the professorial chair of rational mechanics, where he continued until his death in 1958. Sbrana did research in mathematical analysis, geometry, and especially rational mechanics and mathematical physics, including the theory of perfect fluids, elastic deformations, and the metodo simbolico introduced by Giovanni Giorgi.

Sbrana was an Invited Speaker of the ICM in 1928 in Bologna.
