= Georges Tiercy =

Swiss astronomer

- Born: May 9, 1886; Geneva
- Died: October 18, 1955 (aged 69); Geneva
- Scientific career
- Fields: Astronomy
- Institutions: University of Geneva; University of Lausanne

Georges César Tiercy (1886–1955) was a Swiss astronomer and the 7th director of the Observatoire de Genève from 1928 to 1956.

Tiercy received his bachelor of science degree in 1913 from the University of Paris and his Ph.D. in science and mathematics from the University of Geneva in 1915. He was a master in a private college in Ouchy from 1908 to 1912. He taught mathematics in various schools in Geneva from 1913 to 1927 and was a privat-docent at the University of Geneva from 1915. After an internship at the observatories of Hamburg in 1927 and of Arcetri in Florence in 1927–1928, Tiercy became director of the observatory of Geneva in 1928. At the University of Geneva he was professor ordinarius of astronomy from 1928 to 1950 and rector from 1948 to 1950. At the University of Lausanne he was professor extraordinarius of astronomy from 1936 to 1953 and professor ordinarius from 1953 to 1955. He was the author or co-author of more than 250 papers.

Tiercy was an Invited Speaker of the ICM in 1928 at Bologna and in 1932 at Zürich. He was president in 1931 of the Société de Physique et d'Histoire Naturelle (S.P.H.N.) of Geneva and was one of the founders in 1952 of the Swiss National Science Foundation.

He did research on theoretical physics, astrophysics, geodesy, meteorology and chronometry.

== Selected publications ==
- "Sur les courbes orbiformes. Leur utilisation en mecánique". Tôhoku Mathematical Journal. 18: 90–115. 1920.
- "Sur les surfaces sphériformes". Tôhoku Mathematical Journal. 19: 149–163. 1921.
- Tiercy, Georges (1935). "Équilibre radiatif dans les étoiles". Publications of the Observatoire Genève, Series A. 27: 243–254. Bibcode:1935PGenA..27..243T.
- Tiercy, Georges (1939). "La théorie de la relativité dite générale et les observations astronomiques". Publications of the Observatoire Genève, Series A. 34: 455–492. Bibcode:1939PGenA..34..455T.
- Le ciel et ses énigmes. éditions du Mont-Blanc. 1944.
