= Palais theorem =

In mathematics, Palais theorem, named after Richard Palais, may refer to:

- Lie–Palais theorem about vector fields
- Mostow–Palais theorem
- Morse–Palais lemma
