= Ferran Sunyer i Balaguer Prize =

Mathematics award

The Ferran Sunyer i Balaguer Prize is a prize in mathematics, first awarded in 1993. It honors mathematician Ferran Sunyer i Balaguer (1912–1967), a self-taught Catalan mathematician who, despite significant physical disability, was very active in research in classical analysis. This award acknowledges an outstanding mathematical monograph of an expository nature, presenting the latest developments in an active area of mathematics research. The annually awarded prize consists of €15,000 as of 2017. The winning monograph is also published in Birkhauser-Verlag's series Progress in Mathematics. It is awarded by the Ferran Sunyer i Balaguer Foundation.

== Recipients ==
Every recipient ever of the Ferran Sunyer i Balaguer Prize are:

- 1993: Alexander Lubotzky
- 1994: Klaus Schmidt
- 1995: Not awarded
- 1996: V. Kumar Murty, M. Ram Murty
- 1997: Albrecht Böttcher, Y. I. Karlovich
- 1998: Juan J. Morales-Ruiz
- 1999: Patrick Dehornoy
- 2000: Juan-Pablo Ortega, Tudor Ratiu
- 2001: Martin Golubitsky, Ian Stewart
- 2002: Alexander Lubotzky, Dan Segal
- 2002: André Unterberger
- 2003: Fuensanta Andreu-Vaillo, José M. Mazón
- 2004: Guy David
- 2005: Antonio Ambrosetti, Andrea Malchiodi
- 2005: José Seade
- 2006: Xiaonan Ma, George Marinescu
- 2007: Rosa M. Miró-Roig
- 2008: Luis Barreira
- 2009: Tim Browning
- 2010: Carlo Mantegazza
- 2011: Jayce Getz and Mark Goresky
- 2012: Angel Cano, Juan Pablo Navarrete, José Seade.
- 2013: Xavier Tolsa
- 2014: Veronique Fischer, Michael Ruzhansky
- 2015: Not awarded
- 2016: Vladimir Turaev, Alexis Virelizier
- 2017: Antoine Chambert-Loir, Johannes Nicaise, Julien Sebag
- 2018: Michael Ruzhansky, Durvudkhan Suragan
- 2019: Not awarded
- 2020: Urtzi Buijs, Giovanni Catino, Yves Félix, Paolo Mastrolia, Aniceto Murillo, Daniel Tanré
- 2021 Tim Browning
- 2022 Pascal Auscher, Moritz Egert
- 2023 Xavier Fernandez-Real, Xavier Ros-Oton
- 2024 Antonio Córdoba
- 2025 Ferran Cedó, Leandro Vendramin

== See also ==
- List of mathematics awards
