= Guy David (mathematician) =

French mathematician

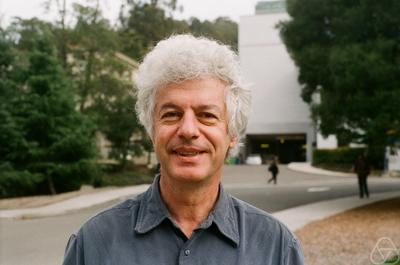
- David in 2014
- Born: 1 June 1957 (age 68); Saint-Omer
- Education: École normale supérieure Université Paris-Sud
- Awards: Salem Prize (1987)
- Scientific career
- Fields: Mathematics
- Doctoral advisor: Yves Meyer

Guy David (born 1957) is a French mathematician, specializing in analysis.

== Biography ==
David studied from 1976 to 1981 at the École normale supérieure, graduating with Agrégation and Diplôme d'études approfondies (DEA). At the University of Paris-Sud (Paris XI) he received in 1981 his doctoral degree (Thèse du 3ème cycle) and in 1986 his higher doctorate (Thèse d'État) with thesis Noyau de Cauchy et opérateurs de Caldéron-Zygmund supervised by Yves Meyer. David was from 1982 to 1989 an attaché de recherches (research associate) at the Centre de mathématiques Laurent Schwartz of the CNRS. At the University of Paris-Sud he was from 1989 to 1991 a professor and from 1991 to 2001 a professor first class, and is since 1991 a professor of the Classe exceptionelle.

David is known for his research on Hardy spaces and on singular integral equations using the methods of Alberto Calderón. In 1998 David solved a special case of a problem of Vitushkin. Among other topics, David has done research on Painlevé's problem of geometrically characterizing removable singularities for bounded functions; Xavier Tolsa's solution of Painlevé's problem is based upon David's methods. With Jean-Lin Journé he proved in 1984 the T(1) Theorem, for which they jointly received the Salem Prize. The T(1) Theorem is of fundamental importance for the theory of singular integral operators of Calderón-Zygmund type. David also did research on the conjecture of David Mumford and Jayant Shah in image processing and made contributions to the theory of Hardy spaces; the contributions were important for Jones' traveling salesman theorem in $\mathbb{R}^2$. David has written several books in collaboration with Stephen Semmes.

== Awards and honors ==
- 1986 — Invited Speaker, International Congress of Mathematicians, Berkeley, California
- 1987 — Salem Prize
- 1990 — Prix IBM France
- 1999 — Foreign Honorary Member of the American Academy of Arts and Sciences
- 2001 — Silver medal of the CNRS
- 2004 — Ferran Sunyer i Balaguer Prize for the article Singular sets of minimizers for the Mumford-Shah functional.
- 2004 — Prix Servant

== Articles ==
- David, Guy (1982), "Courbes corde-arc et espaces de Hardy généralisés", Annales de l'Institut Fourier, 32 (3): 227–239, doi:10.5802/aif.886
- David, Guy (1984), "Opérateurs intégraux singuliers sur certaines courbes du plan complexe" (PDF), Annales Scientifiques de l'École Normale Supérieure, Série 4, 17: 157–189, doi:10.24033/asens.1469
- with Ronald Coifman and Yves Meyer: Coifman, R.R; David, G.; Meyer, Y. (1983), "La solution des conjectures de Calderón" (PDF), Advances in Mathematics, 48 (2): 144–148, doi:10.1016/0001-8708(83)90084-1
- David, Guy (1988), "Morceaux de graphes lipschitziens et intégrales singulières sur une surface", Revista Matemática Iberoamericana, 4 (1): 73–114, doi:10.4171/RMI/64
- with Jean-Lin Journé and Stephen Semmes: David, Guy; Journé, Jean-Lin; Semmes, Stephen (1985), "Opérateurs de Calderon-Zygmund, fonctions para-accrétives et interpolation", Revista Matemática Iberoamericana, 1 (4): 1–56, doi:10.4171/RMI/17
- with Jean-Lin Journé: David, Guy; Journé, Jean-Lin (1984), "A boundedness criterion for generalized Calderón-Zygmund operators", Annals of Mathematics, Second Series, 120 (2): 371–397, doi:10.2307/2006946, JSTOR 2006946
- "$C^1$-arcs for minimizers of the Mumford-Shah functional", SIAM Journal on Applied Mathematics, 56 (3): 783–888, 1996, doi:10.1137/s0036139994276070
- David, Guy (1998), "Unrectifiable 1-sets have vanishing analytic capacity", Revista Matemática Iberoamericana, 14 (2): 369–479, doi:10.4171/RMI/242
- with Pertti Mattila: David, Guy; Mattila, Pertti (2000), "Removable sets for Lipschitz harmonic functions in the plane", Revista Matemática Iberoamericana, 16 (1): 137–215, doi:10.4171/RMI/272
- Fefferman, Charles; Ionescu, Alexandru D.; Phong, Duong Hong; Wainger, Stephen, eds. (2014), "Should we solve Plateau's problem again?", Advances in Analysis: The Legacy of Elias M. Stein, Princeton University Press, pp. 108–145, ISBN 978-0-691-15941-6
- with Tatiana Toro: David, G.; Toro, T. (2015), "Regularity of almost minimizers with free boundary", Calculus of Variations and Partial Differential Equations, 54: 455–524, arXiv:1306.2704, doi:10.1007/s00526-014-0792-z

=== Books ===
- with Stephen Semmes: Analysis of and on uniformly rectifiable sets, Mathematical Surveys and Monographs 38. American Mathematical Society, Providence, RI, 1993.
- with Stephen Semmes: Uniform rectifiability and quasiminimizing sets of arbitrary codimension, Memoirs AMS 2000
- with Stephen Semmes: Singular integrals and rectifiable sets in R^{n} : au-delà des graphes lipschitziens, Astérisque 193, 1991
- with Stephen Semmes: Fractured fractals and broken dreams. Self-similar geometry through metric and measure, Oxford Lecture Series in Mathematics and its Applications 7, Clarendon Press, Oxford 1997
- with Alexis Bonnet, Cracktip is a global Mumford-Shah minimizer, Astérisque 274, 2001
- Wavelets and singular integrals on curves and surfaces, Lecture notes in mathematics 1465, Springer 1991
- Singular sets of minimizers for the Mumford-Shah functional, Progress in Mathematics, Birkhäuser 2005
- with Tatiana Toro: Reifenberg parameterizations for sets with holes, Memoirs of the AMS 215, 2012
- with M. Filoche, D. Jerison, S. Mayboroda: A free boundary problem for the localization of eigenfunctions, Astérisque 392, 2017, arXiv:1406.6596
- Local regularity properties of almost- and quasiminimal sets with a sliding boundary condition, Astérisque 411, 2019, arXiv:1401.1179
