= Xavier Tolsa =

Spanish mathematician

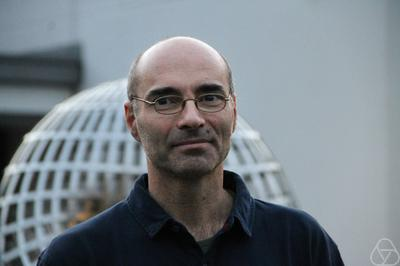
- Tolsa at Oberwolfach in 2015
- Born: 1966 (age 59–60)
- Occupation: Mathematician
- Awards: Salem Prize (2002); EMS Prize (2004); Ferran Sunyer i Balaguer Prize (2013); Rey Jaime I Award (2019)

Xavier Tolsa (born 1966) is a Spanish mathematician, specializing in analysis.

Tolsa is a professor at the Autonomous University of Barcelona and at the Institució Catalana de Recerca i Estudis Avançats (ICREA), the Catalan Institute for Advanced Scientific Studies.

Tolsa does research on harmonic analysis (Calderón-Zygmund theory), complex analysis, geometric measure theory, and potential theory. Specifically, he is known for his research on analytic capacity and removable sets. He solved the problem of A. G. Vitushkin about the semi-additivity of analytic capacity. This enabled him to solve an even older problem of Paul Painlevé on the geometric characterization of removable sets. Tolsa succeeded in solving the Painlevé problem by using the concept of so-called curvatures of measures introduced by Mark Melnikov in 1995. Tolsa's proof involves estimates of Cauchy transforms. He has also done research on the so-called David-Semmes problem involving Riesz transforms and rectifiability.

In 2002 he was awarded the Salem Prize. In 2006 in Madrid he was an Invited Speaker at the ICM with talk Analytic capacity, rectifiability, and the Cauchy integral. He received in 2004 the EMS Prize and was an Invited Lecturer at the 2004 ECM with talk Painlevé's problem, analytic capacity and curvature of measures. In 2013 he received the Ferran Sunyer i Balaguer Prize for his monograph Analytic capacity, the Cauchy transform, and non-homogeneous Calderón-Zygmund theory (Birkhäuser Verlag, 2013}. In 2019 he received the Rei Jaume I prize for his contributions to Mathematics.

== Selected publications ==
- Tolsa, Xavier (2000). "Principal Values for the Cauchy Integral and Rectifiability". Proceedings of the American Mathematical Society. 128 (7): 2111–2119. doi:10.1090/S0002-9939-00-05264-3. JSTOR 119706.
- Tolsa, Xavier (2003). "Painlevé's problem and the semiadditivity of analytic capacity". Acta Mathematica. 190: 105–149. arXiv:math/0204027. doi:10.1007/BF02393237.
- Nazarov, Fedor; Tolsa, Xavier; Volberg, Alexander (2014). "On the uniform rectifiability of AD-regular measures with bounded Riesz transform operator: the case of codimension 1". Acta Mathematica. 213 (2): 237–321. arXiv:1212.5229. doi:10.1007/s11511-014-0120-7. ISSN 0001-5962.
