= Analytic capacity =

Concept in complex analysis

In the mathematical discipline of complex analysis, the analytic capacity of a compact subset K of the complex plane is a number that denotes "how big" a bounded analytic function on C \ K can become. Roughly speaking, γ(K) measures the size of the unit ball of the space of bounded analytic functions outside K.

It was first introduced by Lars Ahlfors in the 1940s while studying the removability of singularities of bounded analytic functions.

== Definition ==
Let K ⊂ C be compact. Then its analytic capacity is defined to be

$$\gamma(K) = \sup \{|f'(\infty)|;\ f\in\mathcal{H}^\infty(\mathbf{C}\setminus K),\ \|f\|_\infty\leq 1,\ f(\infty)=0\}$$

Here, $\mathcal{H}^\infty (U)$ denotes the set of bounded analytic functions U → C, whenever U is an open subset of the complex plane. Further,

$$f'(\infty):= \lim_{z\to\infty}z\left(f(z)-f(\infty)\right)$$
$$f(\infty):= \lim_{z\to\infty}f(z)$$

Note that $f'(\infty) = g'(0)$, where $g(z) = f(1/z)$. However, usually $f'(\infty)\neq \lim_{z\to\infty} f'(z)$.

Equivalently, the analytic capacity may be defined as

$$\gamma(K)=\sup \left|\frac1{2\pi} \int_C f(z)dz\right|$$

where C is a contour enclosing K and the supremum is taken over f satisfying the same conditions as above: f is bounded analytic outside K, the bound is one, and $f(\infty)=0.$

If A ⊂ C is an arbitrary set, then we define

$$\gamma(A) = \sup \{ \gamma(K) : K \subset A, \, K \text{ compact} \}.$$

== Removable sets and Painlevé's problem ==
The compact set K is called removable if, whenever Ω is an open set containing K, every function which is bounded and holomorphic on the set Ω \ K has an analytic extension to all of Ω. By Riemann's theorem for removable singularities, every singleton is removable. This result motivated Paul Painlevé to pose the question in 1880: "Which subsets of C are removable?"

It is easy to see that K is removable if and only if γ(K) = 0. However, analytic capacity is a purely complex-analytic concept, and much more work needs to be done in order to obtain a more geometric characterization.

== Ahlfors function ==
For each compact K ⊂ C, there exists a unique extremal function, i.e. $f\in\mathcal{H}^\infty(\mathbf{C}\setminus K)$ such that $\|f\|\leq 1$, f(∞) = 0 and f′(∞) = γ(K). This function is called the Ahlfors function of K. Its existence can be proved by using a normal family argument involving Montel's theorem.

== Analytic capacity in terms of Hausdorff dimension ==
Let dim_{H} denote Hausdorff dimension and H^{1} denote 1-dimensional Hausdorff measure. Then H^{1}(K) = 0 implies γ(K) = 0 while dim_{H}(K) > 1 guarantees γ(K) > 0. However, the case when dim_{H}(K) = 1 and H^{1}(K) ∈ (0, ∞] is more difficult.

=== Positive length but zero analytic capacity ===
Given the partial correspondence between the 1-dimensional Hausdorff measure of a compact subset of C and its analytic capacity, it might be conjectured that γ(K) = 0 implies H^{1}(K) = 0. However, this conjecture is false. A counterexample was first given by A. G. Vitushkin, and a much simpler one by John B. Garnett in his 1970 paper. This latter example is the linear four corners Cantor set, constructed as follows:

Let K_{0} := [0, 1] × [0, 1] be the unit square. Then, K_{1} is the union of 4 squares of side length 1/4 and these squares are located in the corners of K_{0}. In general, K_{n} is the union of 4^{n} squares (denoted by $Q_n^j$) of side length 4^{−n}, each $Q_n^j$ being in the corner of some $Q_{n-1}^k$. Take K to be the intersection of all K_{n} then $H^1(K)=\sqrt{2}$ but γ(K) = 0.

=== Vitushkin's conjecture ===
Let K ⊂ C be a compact set. Anatoli Vitushkin conjectured that

$$\gamma(K)=0\ \iff \ \int_0^\pi \mathcal H^1(\operatorname{proj}_\theta(K)) \, d\theta = 0$$

where $\operatorname{proj}_\theta(x,y) = x \cos \theta + y\sin\theta$ denotes the orthogonal projection in direction θ. By the results described above, Vitushkin's conjecture is true when dim_{H}K ≠ 1.

Guy David published a proof in 1998 of Vitushkin's conjecture for the case dim_{H}K = 1 and H^{1}(K) < ∞. In 2002, Xavier Tolsa proved that analytic capacity is countably semiadditive. That is, there exists an absolute constant C > 0 such that if K ⊂ C is a compact set and $K = \bigcup_{i=1}^\infty K_i$, where each K_{i} is a Borel set, then $\gamma(K) \leq C \sum_{i=1}^\infty\gamma(K_i)$.

David's and Tolsa's theorems together imply that Vitushkin's conjecture is true when K is H^{1}-sigma-finite.

In the non H^{1}-sigma-finite case, Pertti Mattila proved in 1986 that the conjecture is false, but his proof did not specify which implication of the conjecture fails. Subsequent work by Jones and Muray produced an example of a set with zero Favard length and positive analytic capacity, explicitly disproving one of the directions of the conjecture. As of 2023 it is not known whether the other implication holds but some progress has been made towards a positive answer by Chang and Tolsa.

== See also ==
- Capacity of a set – In Euclidean space, a measure of that set's "size"
- Conformal radius
