= Paul Rabinowitz =

Paul H. Rabinowitz
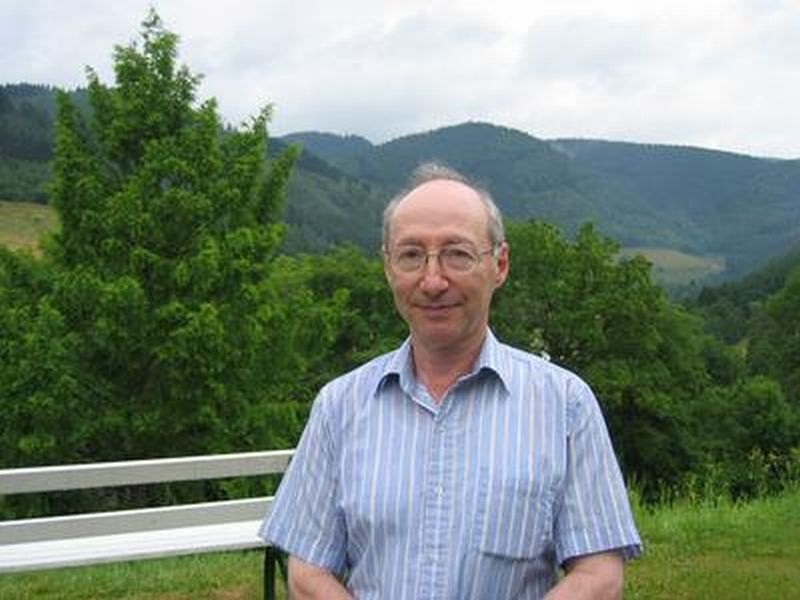
- Born: 1939 (age 86–87)
- Education: New York University
- Scientific career
- Fields: Mathematics
- Workplaces: University of Wisconsin, Madison
- Thesis: Periodic Solutions of Nonlinear Hyperbolic Differential Equations (1966)
- Doctoral advisor: Jürgen Moser

Paul H. Rabinowitz (born 1939) is the Edward Burr Van Vleck Professor of Mathematics and a Vilas Research Professor at the University of Wisconsin, Madison. He received a Ph.D. from New York University in 1966 under the direction of Jürgen Moser. From 1966 to 1969 he held a position as assistant professor at Stanford University. He has visited many mathematical institutions all over the world (among them universities at Aarhus, Pisa, Paris and ETH in Zurich). In 1978 Paul Rabinowitz became a fellow of the John Simon Guggenheim Memorial Foundation.

He works in the fields of partial differential equations and nonlinear analysis. He is best known for his global bifurcation theorem and the mountain pass theorem, the latter done jointly with Antonio Ambrosetti. However also the linking and saddle point theorems, results concerning the existence of periodic solutions to hamiltonian systems, variational methods in the theory of critical points of strongly indefinite functional, in collaboration with Vieri Benci, and under the absence of compactness conditions of the Palais–Smale type. Many other achievements of Paul Rabinowitz have found their place in the history of mathematics.

He is the recipient of numerous honors and awards, including the George David Birkhoff Prize in 1998. He was elected as a member of the United States National Academy of Sciences in 1998. In 2012 he became a fellow of the American Mathematical Society. In 2014 Paul Rabinowitz was awarded with the Juliusz Schauder Medal, the prize established by the Juliusz Schauder Center for Nonlinear Studies at the Nicolaus Copernicus University in Toruń, Poland, in recognition of his important contribution in the field of topological methods in nonlinear analysis.
