= Collectanea Mathematica =

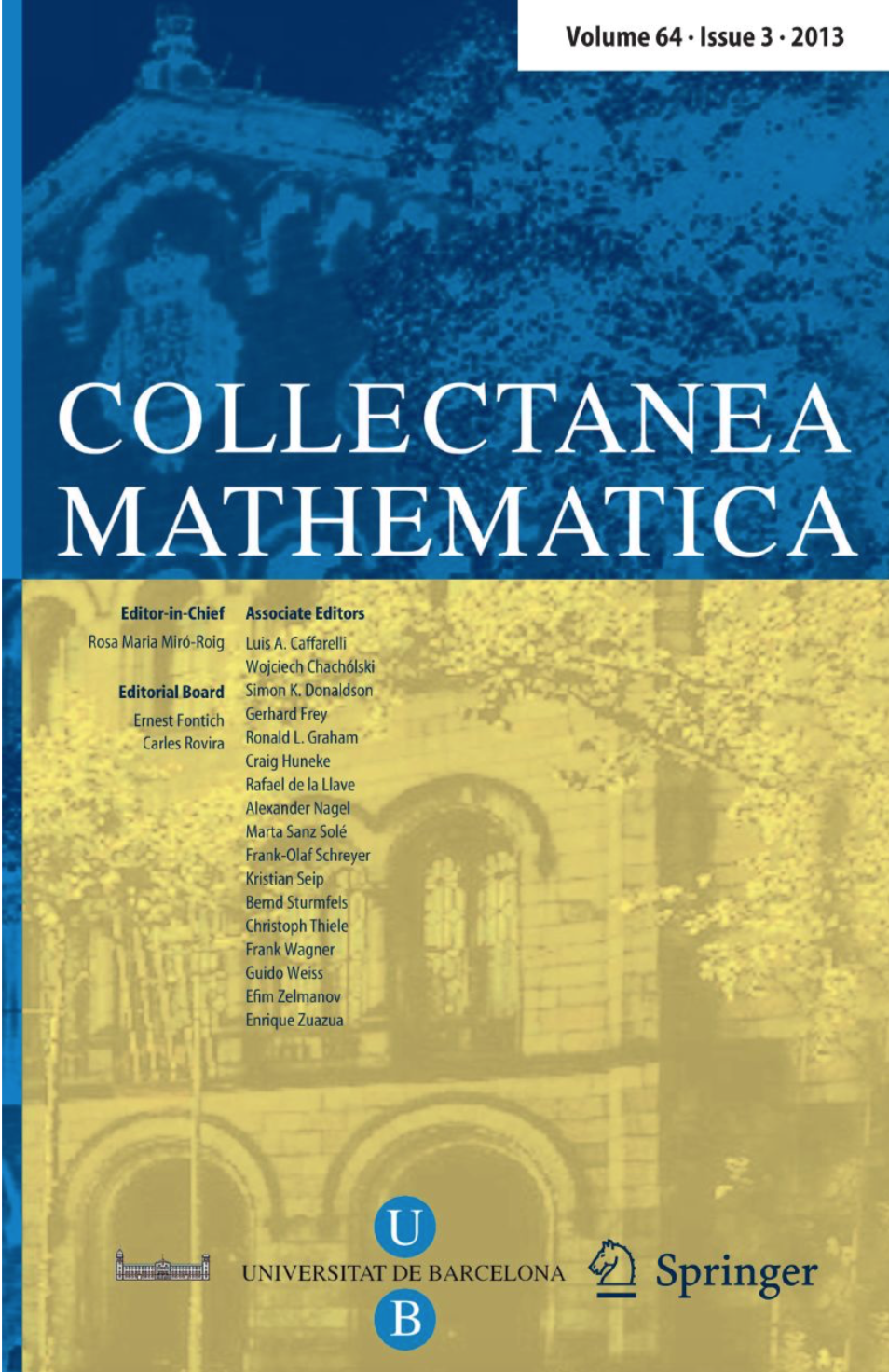
- Discipline: Mathematics
- Language: English

Publication details
- History: 1948–present
- Publisher: Springer Nature on behalf of the Institute of Mathematics of the University of Barcelona (Spain)
- Frequency: Triannual
- Open access: Hybrid
- Impact factor: 1.349 (2021)

Standard abbreviations
- ISO 4: Collect. Math.
- MathSciNet: Collect. Math.

Indexing
- CODEN: COLMBA
- ISSN: 0010-0757 (print); 2038-4815 (web)
- LCCN: 55033512

Links
- Journal homepage

Collectanea Mathematica (Collect. Math.) is a mathematical journal of the Institute of Mathematics of the University of Barcelona (IMUB), published by Springer since 2011, with a periodicity of three issues per year. It publishes original research papers in all fields of pure and applied mathematics.

== History ==
Collectanea Mathematica was founded in 1948 by José M. Orts (it is the oldest mathematical journal in Spain). Thanks to the contribution of some relevant mathematicians in Catalonia, like Ferran Sunyer Balaguer, and eminent international collaborators (Wilhelm Blaschke, Hugo Hadwiger, Gaston Julia or Ernst Witt), the journal reached a central role in the Spanish scientific publications, under the direction of Enrique Linés (1969-1971), who was also president of the Real Sociedad Matemática Española, and specially with Josep Teixidor (1971-1986), president of the Societat Catalana de Ciències Físiques, Químiques i Matemàtiques (1968-1973). During the period 1987–2007, with Joan Cerdà as the Main Editor, the journal took several steps forward to further improve its scientific quality. In 2003, the recently created Institute of Mathematics of the University of Barcelona started to be in charge of its publication, providing Collectanea Mathematica with a stable economic and scientific support. As a consequence, coverage of Collectanea Mathematica by the Journal Citation Reports (JCR) began with the 2005 volume and 2007 was its first impact factor in JCR. In 2008 Rosa Maria Miró Roig became editor-in-chief. In this period the journal has changed its editorial policy and Springer is the new publisher since 2011. Since 2021 the current editor-in-chief is Carlos D'Andrea.

== Abstracting and indexing ==
Collectanea Mathematica is indexed in databases such as Current Contents (Physical Chemical and Earth Sciences) and ISI Web of Science, MathSciNet, Zentralblatt MATH, and Scopus.
