= Chuu-Lian Terng =

Taiwanese-American mathematician

- 滕楚蓮
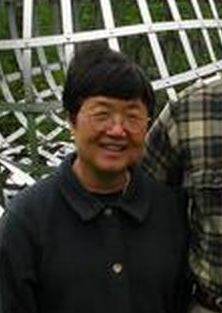
- Terng in 2010
- Born: 1949 (age 76–77); Hualien City
- Occupation: Mathematician
- Years active: 1976–present
- Spouse: Richard Palais

Academic background
- Education: National Taiwan University (BS); Brandeis University (PhD)
- Thesis: Natural Vector Bundles and Natural Differential Operators (1976)
- Doctoral advisor: Richard Palais

Chuu-Lian Terng (Chinese: 滕楚蓮; pinyin: Téng Chǔlián; born 1949) is a Taiwanese-American mathematician. Her research areas are differential geometry and integrable systems, with particular interests in completely integrable Hamiltonian partial differential equations and their relations to differential geometry, the geometry and topology of submanifolds in symmetric spaces, and the geometry of isometric actions.

== Education and career ==
She received her B.S. from National Taiwan University in 1971 and her Ph.D. from Brandeis University in 1976 under the supervision of Richard Palais, whom she later married. She was a postdoctoral researcher at the University of California, Berkeley from 1976 to 1978, an assistant professor at Princeton University from 1978 to 1982, and was faculty at Northeastern University from 1982 to 2004. She was the first female assistant professor in mathematics at Princeton University. She is currently a professor emerita at the University of California, Irvine, which she joined in 2004. She also spent two years at the Institute for Advanced Study (IAS) in Princeton and two years at the Max-Planck Institute in Bonn, Germany.

Terng has been an active member of the Association for Women in Mathematics (AWM). She served as AWM President from 1995 to 1997, chaired the Julia Robinson Celebration of Women in Math Conference, which was held July 1–3, 1996, and chaired the Michler Prize and Travel/Mentoring Grant Committees.

Terng has served on the editorial boards of the Transactions of the AMS, the Taiwanese Journal of Mathematics, Communications of Analysis and Geometry, the Proceedings of the AMS, and the Journal of Fixed Point Theory and its Applications.

In 1999, she was selected as the AWM/MAA Falconer Lecturer. Her citation reads:

Her early research concerned the classification of natural vector bundles and natural differential operators between them. She then became interested in submanifold geometry. Her main contributions are developing a structure theory for isoparametric submanifolds in $\mathbb{R}^n$ and constructing soliton equations from special submanifolds. Recently, Terng and Karen Uhlenbeck (University of Texas at Austin) have developed a general approach to integrable PDEs that explains their hidden symmetries in terms of loop group actions. She is co-author of the book Submanifold Geometry and Critical Point Theory and an editor of the Journal of Differential Geometry survey volume 4 on "Integrable systems". Professor Terng served as president of the Association for Women in Mathematics (AWM) from 1995 to 1997 and as Member-at-Large of the Council of the American Mathematical Society (AMS) from 1989 to 1992. She is currently on the Advisory Board of the National Center for Theoretical Sciences in Taiwan, the Steering Committee of the Institute for Advanced Study Park City Summer Institute, and the Editorial Board of the Transactions of the AMS.

In 2006, she was an Invited Speaker at the International Congress of Mathematicians in Madrid. In 2011, she gave an AMS-MAA Invited Address at the Joint Mathematics Meeting in New Orleans.

== Honors ==
- Sloan Fellowship in 1980.
- Humboldt Senior Scientist Award in 1997.
- AWM/MAA Falconer Lecturer in 1999
- Fellow of the American Mathematical Society, 2012.
- Fellow of the Association for Women in Mathematics, 2018 (inaugural class).

== Recognition ==
With Sun-Yung Alice Chang, Fan Chung, Winnie Li, Jang-Mei Wu, and Mei-Chi Shaw, Terng is one of a group of six women mathematicians from National Taiwan University called by Shiing-Shen Chern "a miracle in Chinese history; the glory of the Chinese people".
