= Tula Suvorov Military School =

Military educational institution of secondary education in Russia

- Тульское суворовское военное училище
- Emblem of the School
- Type: boarding school
- Established: 1944 (first time); 2016 (recreation)
- Founders: Soviet Government
- Affiliations: Ministry of Defense
- Rector: Colonel Dmitry Sakseev
- Students: 400
- Location: Tula, Russia
- Language: Russian
- Website: http://tlsvu.mil.ru/

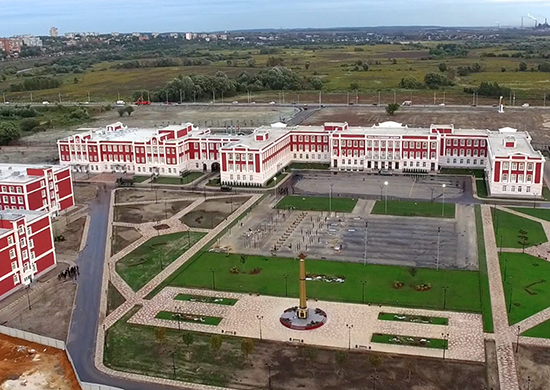
Suvorov Military School (2016).

The Tula Suvorov Military School (TlSVU) (Note: Russian: Тульское суворовское военное училище, romanized: Tulskoye suvorovskoye voyennoye uchilishche) is a military educational institution of secondary education of the Ministry of Defense of Russia. It was the second Suvorov Military School to be founded in the Soviet Union. It is primarily geared towards the Russian Air Force.

== Early history ==
The first head of the school was Major General Ivan Khokhlov, appointed on 7 July 1944. Its formation came three days after the foundation of the Moscow Suvorov Military School. On 7 November 1944, on the occasion of the 27th anniversary of the 1917 Great October Socialist Revolution, the school was officially opened. The Suvorov Military School was a notable participant in the Moscow Victory Parade of 1945 on Red Square. The first graduation of cadets took place in 1949. On 24 June 1960, on the 15th anniversary of its participation in the military parade in Moscow, the school was disbanded by order of the Council of Ministers of the Soviet Union. More than 400 students were assigned to other affiliated military schools in Voronezh, Moscow, and Minsk. It was replaced by the educational and material base boarding school, which was active until August 2001.

== Recreation ==
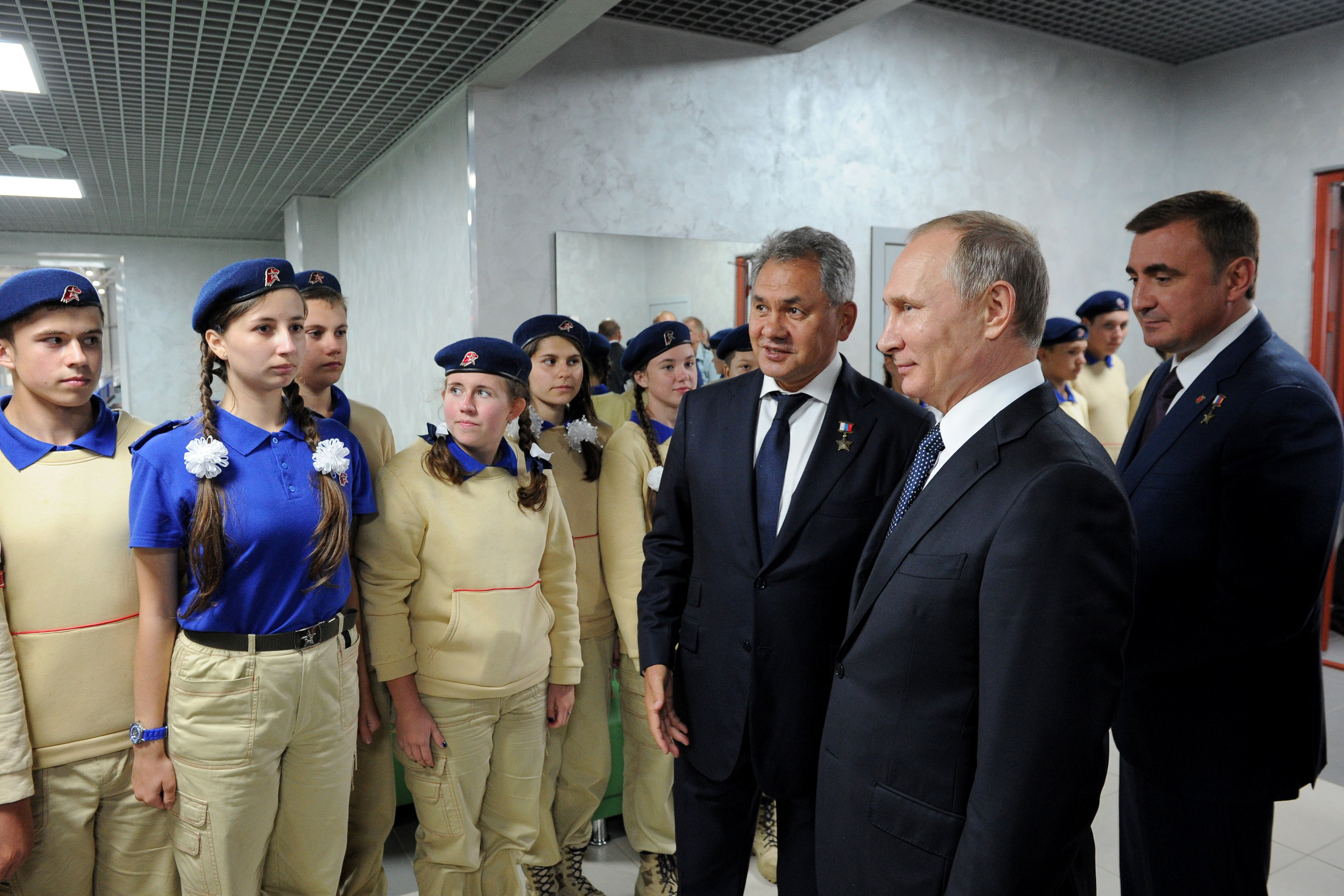
Alexey Dyumin, Sergei Shoigu and Vladimir Putin at the Suvorov Military School on 8 September 2016

In March 2016, Alexey Dyumin, the governor of Tula Oblast (and a former lieutenant general in the Russian military himself) recommended to President Vladimir Putin that the school should be revived. Following Dyumin's recommendations, he ordered the following month that construction begin on new educational buildings in the Eastern Bypass of Tula.

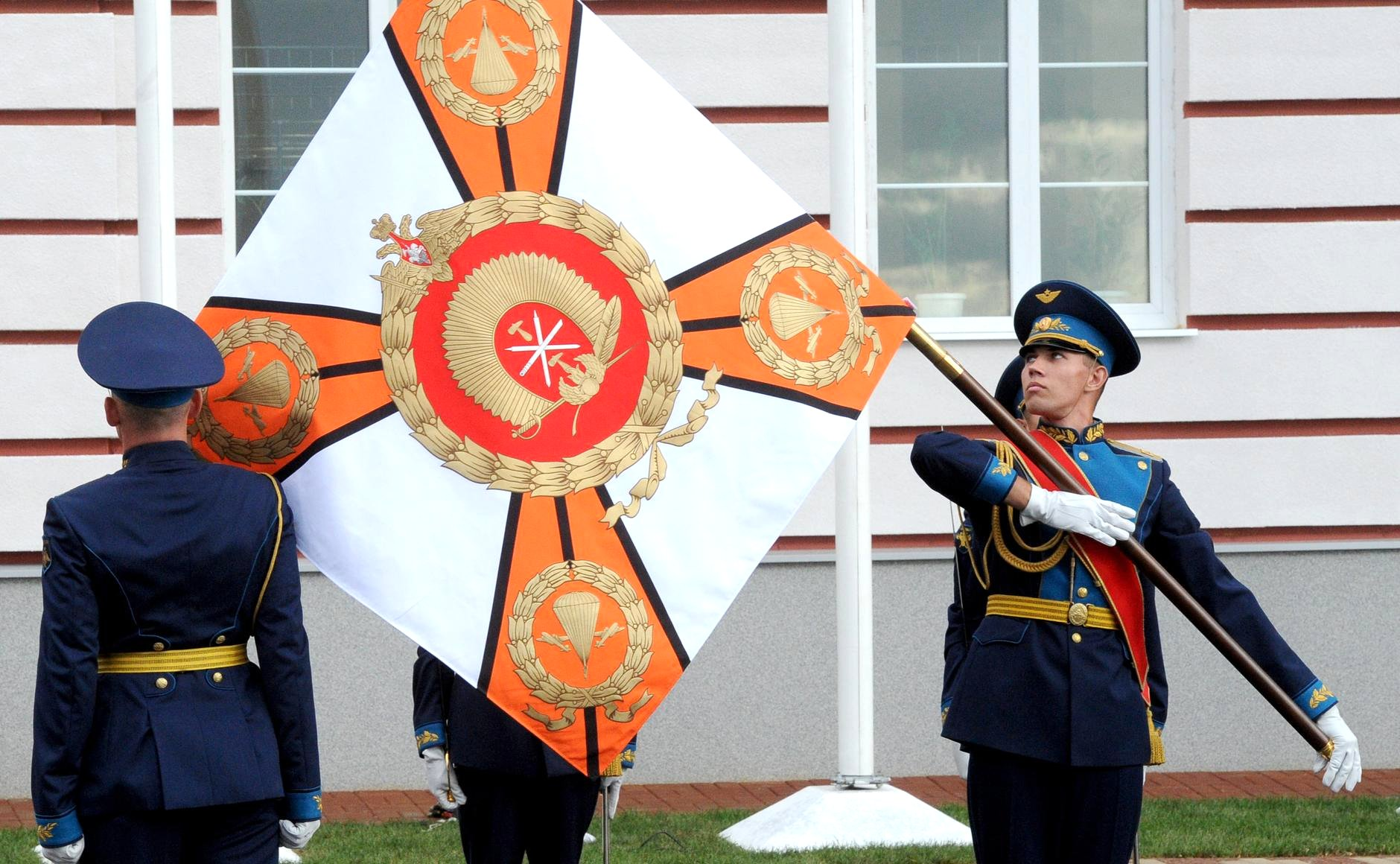
The school colour

On 1 September 2016, the original 240 students began to study at the school, beginning the 2016-2017 school year. President Vladimir Putin visited the reinstated school on 8 September 2016, participating in the presentation ceremony of the school colours. In the spring of the following year, the second phase of construction at the school began. The school was decided to be subordinate to the Commander-in-Chief of Russian Airborne Forces

== Alumni ==
- Anatoli Georgievich Vitushkin — Soviet mathematician who notably worked on the theory of analytic capacity.
