= Wang Qiming =

Chinese mathematician (1941–1989)

- 王启明
- Born: June 4, 1941; Yan'an, Shaanxi, China
- Died: April 7, 1989 (aged 47); United States
- Education: University of Science and Technology of China
- Scientific career
- Fields: Mathematics
- Workplaces: Institute of Mathematics, the Chinese Academy of Sciences

Wang Qiming (simplified Chinese: 王启明; traditional Chinese: 王啓明; pinyin: Wáng Qǐmíng; June 4, 1941 – April 7, 1989) was a Chinese mathematician who was known for his work in differential geometry. He was considered as one of the best differential geometers in China of the time.

== Biography ==
Wang Qiming was born in Yan'an, Shaanxi. In 1960, he graduated from Beijing 101 Middle School and was admitted to the five-year bachelor's degree programme of the Department of Mathematics of the University of Science and Technology of China. In 1965, he entered the Institute of Mathematics of the Chinese Academy of Sciences to study under Wu Wenjun. Once Wang pointed out a mistake that Wu made in a lesson and told Wu the German book upon which he based. Wu was greatly impressed.

After the institute had recovered in early 1970s from the disruption of the Cultural Revolution, Wang worked intensely in differential geometry and topology.

After mainland China had reopened to the world, Wang actively engaged in international research cooperations. He was one of the first Chinese visiting scholars to the United States in 1978 when he visited the University of California at Berkeley for two years. Later, he also visited the IHES, Max-Planck-Institut, the CIME in Italy and University of Texas at Austin.

== Academic career ==
Wang was a senior researcher of the Institute of Mathematics of the Chinese Academy of Sciences, a member of its academic committee and the person in charge of graduate student affairs. Wang had also been the acting deputy director of the institute. Since 1988, Wang had been the deputy editor-in-chief of the Chinese mathematics journal 数学进展 (Advances in Mathematics (China)). He was a committee member of the International Centre for Theoretical Physics in Italy.

== Death ==
On April 7, 1989, Wang was killed in a car accident. He was a passenger in a car whose driver was Shing-Tung Yau, and the accident occurred when Yau was making a turn. Wang had just arrived in the United States the day before and planned to visit Harvard University for several months. He would likely have become the director of the Institute of Mathematics had he returned to China after this visit. His teacher Wu Wenjun thought that Wang would certainly have been a leader of Chinese mathematics if the accident had not had happened. A memorial service was held in Beijing on July 20 that year.

== Research ==
Wang Qiming worked on differential geometry and symmetric spaces. He made a number of important contributions to isoparametric functions and minimal hypersurfaces.
