= Numerosity =

Numerosity may refer to:

== Cognitive science ==
- Numerical cognition, a subdiscipline of cognitive science that studies the cognitive, developmental and neural bases of numbers and mathematics.

== Mathematics ==
- Numerosity (mathematics), a theory for counting the number of elements of sets having infinite elements. It is a theory that refines Cantor's cardinality.

== Psychology ==
- Number sense, a term used for the hypothesis that some animals, particularly humans, have a biologically determined ability that allows them to represent and manipulate large numerical quantities.
