= Dehornoy order =

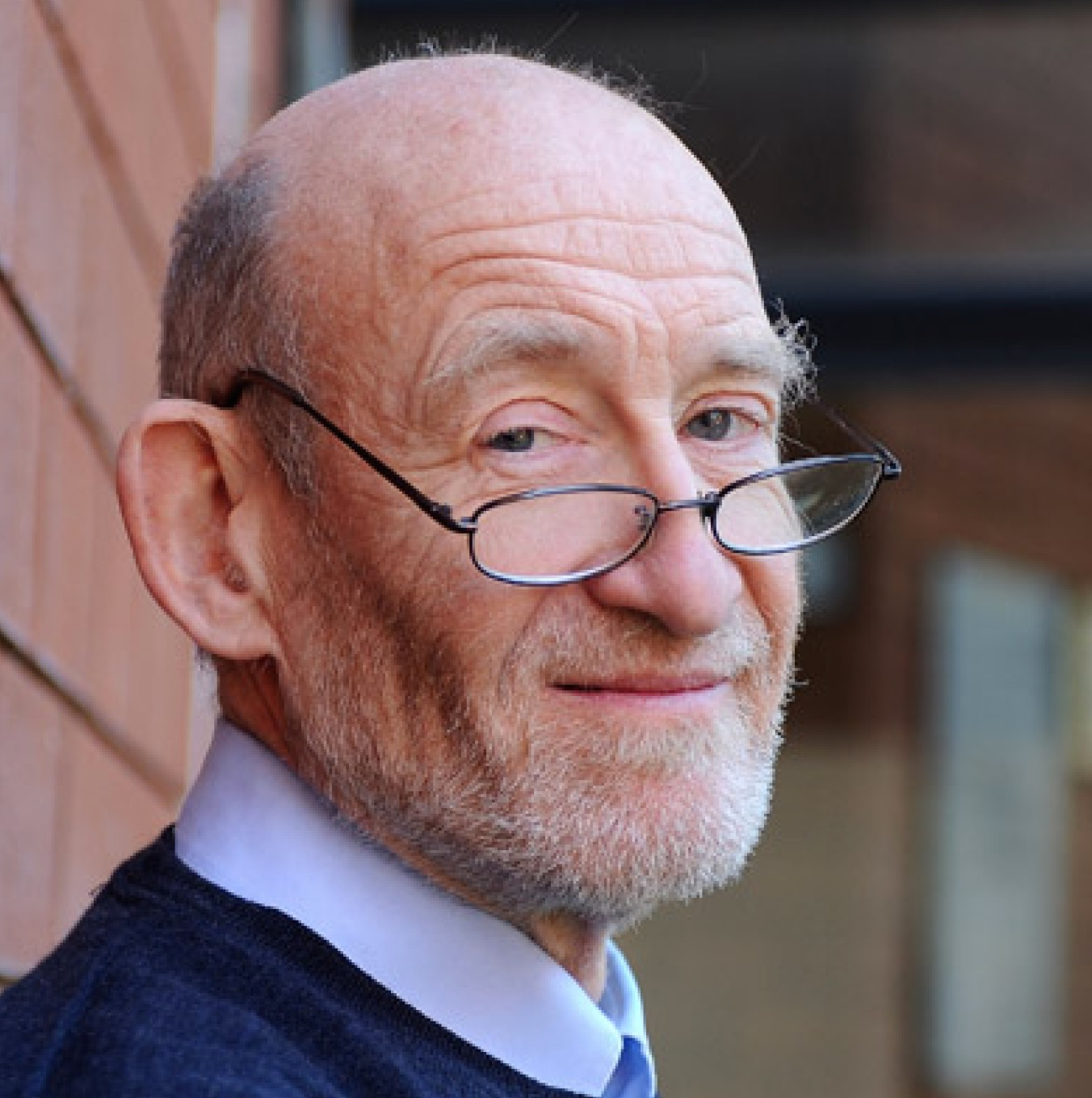
Patrick Dehornoy in 2012

In the mathematical area of braid theory, the Dehornoy order is a left-invariant total order on the braid group, found by Patrick Dehornoy. Dehornoy's original discovery of the order on the braid group used huge cardinals, but there are now several more elementary constructions of it.

== Definition ==
Suppose that $\sigma_1, \ldots, \sigma_{n-1}$ are the usual generators of the braid group $B_n$ on $n$ strings. Define a $\sigma_i$-positive word to be a braid that admits at least one expression in the elements $\sigma_1, \ldots, \sigma_{n-1}$ and their inverses, such that the word contains $\sigma_i$, but does not contain $\sigma_i^{-1}$ nor $\sigma_j^{\pm 1}$ for $j<i$.

The set $P$ of positive elements in the Dehornoy order is defined to be the elements that can be written as a $\sigma_i$-positive word for some $i$. We have:

- $PP \subseteq P;$
- $P, \{1\}$ and $P^{-1}$ are disjoint ("acyclicity property");
- the braid group is the union of $P, \{1\}$ and $P^{-1}$ ("comparison property").

These properties imply that if we define $a < b$ as $a^{-1}b \in P$ then we get a left-invariant total order on the braid group. For example, $\sigma_1 < \sigma_2 \sigma_1$ because the braid word $\sigma_1^{-1} \sigma_2 \sigma_1$ is not $\sigma_1$-positive, but, by the braid relations, it is equivalent to the $\sigma_1$-positive word $\sigma_2\sigma_1 \sigma_2^{-1}$, which lies in $P$.

== History ==
Set theory introduces the hypothetical existence of various "hyper-infinity" notions such as large cardinals. In 1989, it was proved that one such notion, axiom $I_3$, implies the existence of an algebraic structure called an acyclic shelf which in turn implies the decidability of the word problem for the left self-distributivity law $LD: x(yz)=(xy)(xz),$ a property that is a priori unconnected with large cardinals.

In 1992, Dehornoy produced an example of an acyclic shelf by introducing a certain groupoid $\mathcal{G}_{LD}$ that captures the geometrical aspects of the $LD$ law. As a result, an acyclic shelf was constructed on the braid group $B_\infty$, which happens to be a quotient of $\mathcal{G}_{LD}$, and this implies the existence of the braid order directly. Since the braid order appears precisely when the large cardinal assumption is eliminated, the link between the braid order and the acyclic shelf was only evident via the original problem from set theory.

== Properties ==
- The existence of the order shows that every braid group $B_n$ is an orderable group and that, consequently, the algebras $\Z B_n$ and $\C B_n$ have no zero-divisor.
- For $n \geqslant 3$, the Dehornoy order is not invariant on the right: we have $\sigma_2 < \sigma_1$ and $\sigma_2 \sigma_1 > \sigma_1^2$. In fact no order of $B_n$ with $n \geqslant 3$ may be invariant on both sides.
- For $n \geqslant 3$, the Dehornoy order is neither Archimedean, nor Conradian: there exist braids $\beta_1, \beta_2$ satisfying $\beta_1^p < \beta_2$ for every $p$ (for instance $\beta_1 = \sigma_2$ and $\beta_2 = \sigma_1$), and braids $\beta_1, \beta_2$ greater than $1$ satisfying $\beta_1 > \beta_2 \beta_1^p$ for every $p$ (for instance, $\beta_1 = \sigma_2^{-1} \sigma_1$ and $\beta_2 = \sigma_2^{-2} \sigma_1$).
- The Dehornoy order is a well-ordering when restricted to the positive braid monoid $B_n^+$ generated by $\sigma_1, \ldots, \sigma_{n-1}$. The order type of the Dehornoy order restricted to $B_n^+$ is the ordinal $\omega^{\omega^{n - 2}}$.
- The Dehornoy order is also a well-ordering when restricted to the dual positive braid monoid $B_n^{*+}$ generated by the elements $\sigma_i \dots \sigma_{j-1} \sigma_{j} \sigma_{j-1}^{-1}\dots \sigma_i^{-1}$ with $1 \leqslant i < j \leqslant n$, and the order type of the Dehornoy order restricted to $B_n^{*+}$ is also $\omega^{\omega^{n - 2}}$.
- As a binary relation, the Dehornoy order is decidable. The best decision algorithm is based on Dynnikov's tropical formulas, see Chapter XII of; the resulting algorithm admits a uniform complexity $O(\ell^2)$.

== Connection with knot theory ==
- Let $\Delta_n$ be Garside's fundamental half-turn braid. Every braid $\beta$ lies in a unique interval $[\Delta_n^{2m}, \Delta_n^{2m + 2})$; call the integer $m$ the Dehornoy floor of $\beta$, denoted $\lfloor \beta \rfloor$. Then the link closure of braids with a large floor behave nicely, namely the properties of $\widehat{\beta}$ can be read easily from $\beta$. Here are some examples.
- If $\vert \lfloor \beta \rfloor \vert > 1$ then $\widehat{\beta}$ is prime, non-split, and non-trivial.
- If $\vert \lfloor \beta \rfloor \vert > 1$ and $\widehat{\beta}$ is a knot, then $\widehat{\beta}$ is a toric knot if and only if $\beta$ is periodic, $\widehat{\beta}$ is a satellite knot if and only if $\beta$ is reducible, and $\widehat{\beta}$ is hyperbolic if and only if $\beta$ is pseudo-Anosov.
