= Mountain pass theorem =

Mathematical theorem

The mountain pass theorem is an existence theorem from the calculus of variations, originally due to Antonio Ambrosetti and Paul Rabinowitz. Given certain conditions on a function, the theorem demonstrates the existence of a saddle point. The theorem is unusual in that there are many other theorems regarding the existence of extrema, but few regarding saddle points.

== Statement ==
The assumptions of the theorem are:

- $I$ is a functional from a Hilbert space H to the reals,
- $I\in C^1(H,\mathbb{R})$ and $I'$ is Lipschitz continuous on bounded subsets of H,
- $I$ satisfies the Palais–Smale compactness condition,
- $I[0]=0$,
- there exist positive constants r and a such that $I[u]\geq a$ if $\Vert u\Vert =r$, and
- there exists $v\in H$ with $\Vert v\Vert >r$ such that $I[v]\leq 0$.

If we define:

$$\Gamma=\{\mathbf{g}\in C([0,1];H)\,\vert\,\mathbf{g}(0)=0,\mathbf{g}(1)=v\}$$

and:

$$c=\inf_{\mathbf{g}\in\Gamma}\max_{0\leq t\leq 1} I[\mathbf{g}(t)],$$

then the conclusion of the theorem is that c is a critical value of I.

== Visualization ==
The intuition behind the theorem is in the name "mountain pass." Consider I as describing elevation. Then we know two low spots in the landscape: the origin because $I[0]=0$, and a far-off spot v where $I[v]\leq 0$. In between the two lies a range of mountains (at $\Vert u\Vert =r$) where the elevation is high (higher than a>0). In order to travel along a path g from the origin to v, we must pass over the mountains—that is, we must go up and then down. Since I is somewhat smooth, there must be a critical point somewhere in between. (Think along the lines of the mean-value theorem.) The mountain pass lies along the path that passes at the lowest elevation through the mountains. Note that this mountain pass is almost always a saddle point.

For a proof, see section 8.5 of Evans.

== Weaker formulation ==
Let $X$ be Banach space. The assumptions of the theorem are:

- $\Phi\in C(X,\mathbf R)$ and have a Gateaux derivative $\Phi'\colon X\to X^*$ which is continuous when $X$ and $X^*$ are endowed with strong topology and weak* topology respectively.
- There exists $r>0$ such that one can find certain $\|x'\|>r$ with

$$\max\,(\Phi(0),\Phi(x'))<\inf\limits_{\|x\|=r}\Phi(x)=:m(r)$$.

- $\Phi$ satisfies weak Palais–Smale condition on $\{x\in X\mid m(r)\le\Phi(x)\}$.

In this case there is a critical point $\overline x\in X$ of $\Phi$ satisfying $m(r)\le\Phi(\overline x)$. Moreover, if we define

$$\Gamma=\{c\in C([0,1],X)\mid c\,(0)=0,\,c\,(1)=x'\}$$

then

$$\Phi(\overline x)=\inf_{c\,\in\,\Gamma}\max_{0\le t\le 1}\Phi(c\,(t)).$$

For a proof, see section 5.5 of Aubin and Ekeland.
