= Jill P. Mesirov =

American mathematician

Jill Mesirov
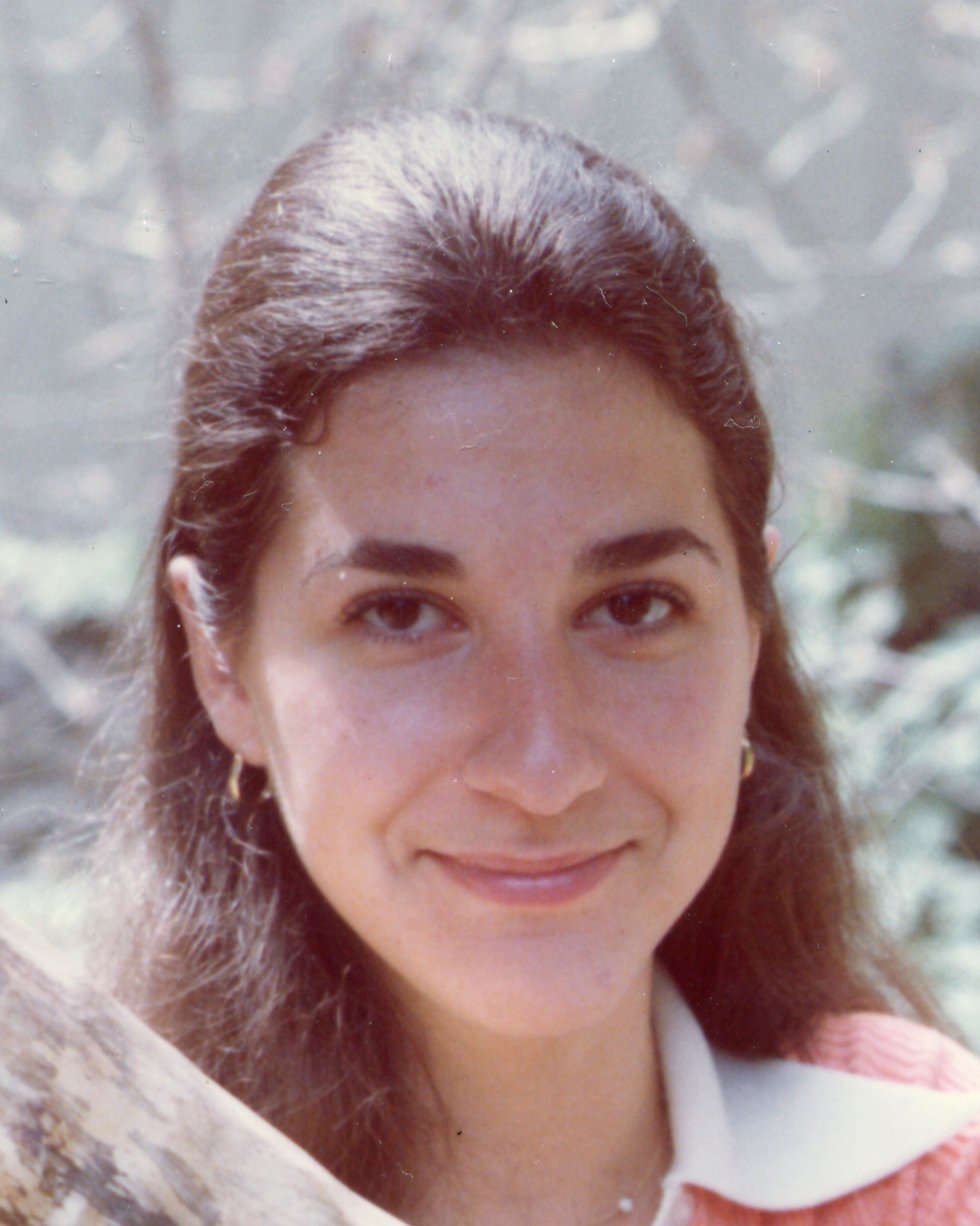
- Born: Jill P. Mesirov
- Other name: Jill P. Mesirov-Kazdan
- Education: University of Pennsylvania (BA); Brandeis University (PhD)
- Spouse: Benedict Gross (m. 1982; died 2025)
- Children: 2
- Awards: ISCB Fellow (2012)
- Scientific career
- Workplaces: University of California, San Diego; Broad Institute; Boston University
- Thesis: Perturbation theory for the existence of critical points in the calculus of variations (1974)
- Doctoral advisor: Richard Palais
- Website: medschool.ucsd.edu/about/leadership/Pages/jill-mesirov.aspx

Jill P. Mesirov (also published as Jill P. Mesirov-Kazdan) is an American mathematician, computer scientist, and computational biologist who is the Associate Vice Chancellor for Computational Health Sciences at the University of California, San Diego. She previously held an adjunct faculty position at Boston University and was the associate director and chief informatics officer at the Eli and Edythe L. Broad Institute of MIT and Harvard.

== Education ==
Mesirov did her undergraduate studies at the University of Pennsylvania, and earned a doctorate in mathematics from Brandeis University in 1974, under the supervision of Richard Palais.

== Research and career ==
Her research concerns high-performance computing. Effective July 1, 2015, she has been appointed Associate Vice Chancellor for Computational Health Sciences and Professor of Medicine at the University of California, San Diego School of Medicine and Moores Cancer Center.

She has worked at the University of California, Berkeley, the American Mathematical Society, Thinking Machines Corporation, and IBM before joining the Whitehead Institute of MIT in 1997, which eventually became part of the Broad Institute. She was president of the Association for Women in Mathematics from 1989 to 1991. She served on the Board of Trustees for the Institute for Computational and Experimental Research in Mathematics (ICERM) from 2017 to 2021.

== Awards and honors ==
Mesirov became a fellow of the American Association for the Advancement of Science in 1996. In 2012, she was elected an ISCB Fellow by the International Society for Computational Biology in 2012, and one of the inaugural fellows of the American Mathematical Society. In 2017, she was selected as a fellow of the Association for Women in Mathematics in the inaugural class.

== Personal life ==
Mesirov first met her husband Benedict Gross at a party hosted by Robert Langlands. They married in 1982 and had two sons. Gross died on December 19, 2025.

== Publications ==
- (co-ed.) Mathematical Approaches to Biomolecular Structure and Dynamics. The IMA Volumes in Mathematics and its Applications, avec Klaus Schulten et De Witt Sumners, Springer, 254p. ISBN 1461284856
- (coll.) Research in Computational Molecular Biology, 9th Annual International Conference, RECOMB 2005, Cambridge, MA, USA, May 14–18, 2005, Proceedings (Lecture Notes in Computer Science), Springer, 632p. ISBN 3540258663
- Very Large Scale Computing in the 21st Century, Society for Industrial & Applied Mathematics, 1991, 345p. ISBN 0898712793
