= Patrick Dehornoy =

French mathematician (1952–2019)

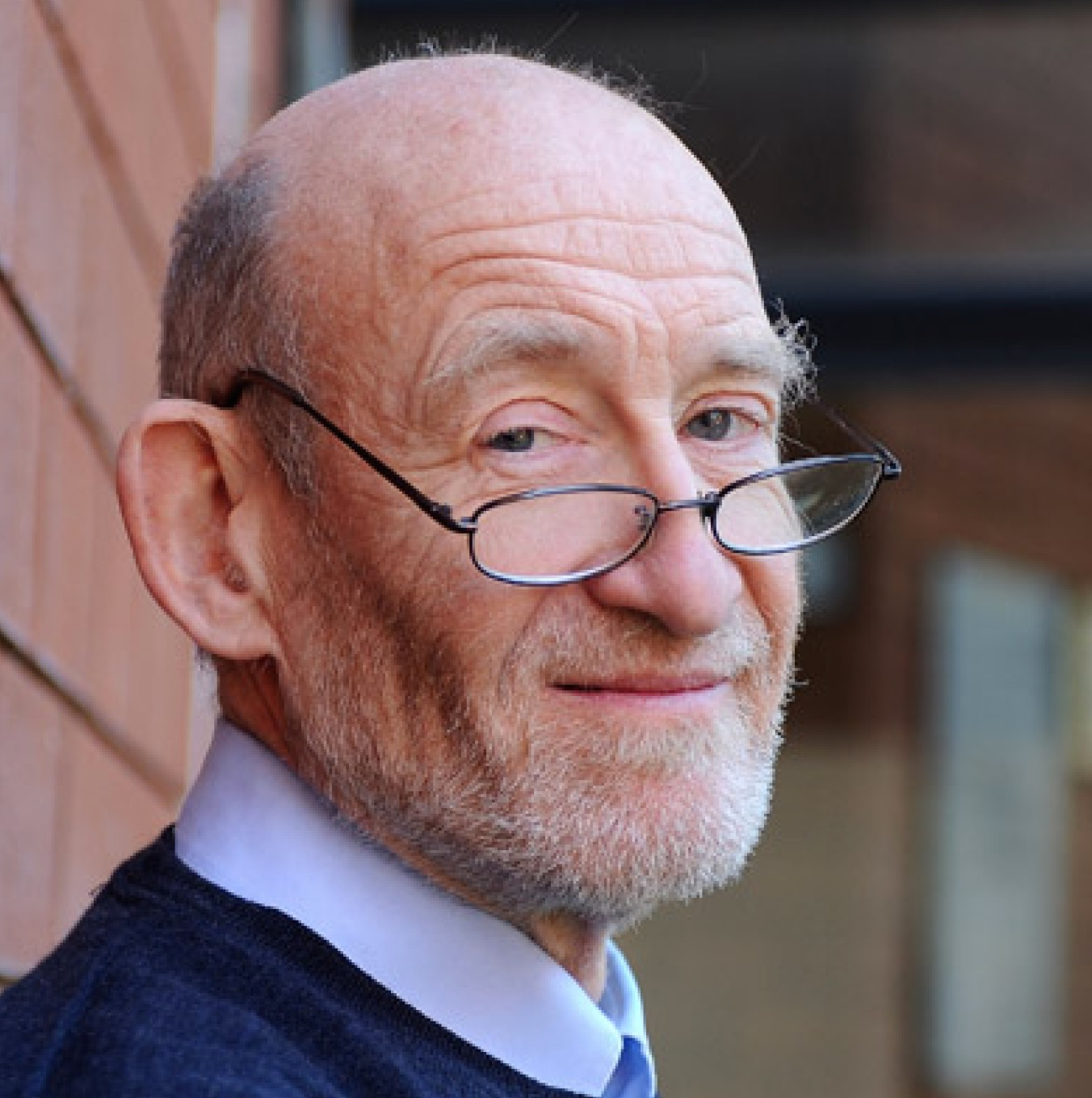
- Dehornoy in 2013
- Born: 11 September 1952; Rouen, France
- Died: 4 September 2019 (aged 66); Villejuif, France
- Education: University of Paris; École normale supérieure
- Awards: Ferran Sunyer i Balaguer Prize (1999); Senior member of the Institut Universitaire de France (2002); Prix Langevin (2005); EMS Monograph Award (2014)
- Scientific career
- Fields: Mathematics
- Workplaces: University of Caen Normandy; French National Centre for Scientific Research
- Doctoral advisor: Kenneth Walter McAloon

Patrick Dehornoy (11 September 1952 – 4 September 2019) was a mathematician at the University of Caen Normandy who worked on set theory and group theory.

== Early life and education ==
Dehornoy was born on 11 September 1952 in Rouen, France. He graduated from the Lycée Pierre-Corneille in 1971. He studied at the École normale supérieure from 1971 to 1975 and completed his Ph.D. in 1978 at the University of Paris, with a thesis written under the direction of Kenneth Walter McAloon.

== Career ==
Dehornoy was a researcher at the French National Centre for Scientific Research (CNRS) from 1975 to 1982. He was at the University of Caen Normandy as a Professor from 1983 to 2017 and as an Emeritus Professor from 2017 until his death. From 2009 to 2013, he was an adjunct scientific director of the Institut national des sciences mathématiques et de leurs interactions (INSMI) at the CNRS. Dehornoy died on 4 September 2019 in Villejuif, France at the age of 66.

== Research ==
Dehornoy found one of the first applications of large cardinals to algebra by constructing a certain left-invariant total order, called the Dehornoy order, on the braid group. In his later career, he was a major contributor to the theory of braid groups, including creating a fast algorithm for comparing braids, and was one of the main contributors to the development of Garside methods.

== Awards ==
In 1999, Dehornoy received the Ferran Sunyer i Balaguer Prize. In 2002, he was elected a senior member of the Institut Universitaire de France (renewed in 2007). In 2005, he received the Prix Langevin of the French Academy of Sciences. In 2014, he received the EMS Monograph Award for his book Foundations of Garside Theory.

== Selected publications ==
- Dehornoy, Patrick (1994), "Braid groups and left distributive operations", Transactions of the American Mathematical Society, 345 (1): 115–150, doi:10.2307/2154598, ISSN 0002-9947, JSTOR 2154598, MR 1214782
- Dehornoy, Patrick (1995), "From large cardinals to braids via distributive algebra", Journal of Knot Theory and Its Ramifications, 4 (1): 33–79, doi:10.1142/S0218216595000041, ISSN 0218-2165, MR 1321290
- Dehornoy, Patrick; Dynnikov, Ivan; Rolfsen, Dale; Wiest, Bert (2008), Ordering braids, Mathematical Surveys and Monographs, vol. 148, Providence, R.I.: American Mathematical Society, ISBN 978-0-8218-4431-1, MR 2463428
- Dehornoy, Patrick; Digne, François; Godelle, Eddy; Krammer, Daan; Michel, Jean (2015), Foundations of Garside theory, EMS Tracts in Mathematics, vol. 22, Zürich: European Mathematical Society, ISBN 978-3-03719-139-2, MR 3362691
- Dehornoy, Patrick (2017), "Multifraction reduction (II): conjectures for Artin–Tits groups", Journal of Combinatorial Algebra, 1 (3): 229–287, arXiv:1606.08995, doi:10.4171/JCA/1-3-1, ISSN 2415-6302, MR 3681576, S2CID 119604700
