= Edward Bierstone =

Canadian mathematician

- Born: December 21, 1946 (age 79)
- Citizenship: Canadian
- Education: Brandeis University
- Awards: Fellow of the Royal Society of Canada 1992; Jeffery–Williams Prize 2005; Fellow of the American Mathematical Society 2012; David Borwein Award 2026
- Scientific career
- Fields: Mathematics
- Institutions: Fields Institute; University of Toronto
- Doctoral advisor: Richard Sheldon Palais

Edward Bierstone FRSC (born December 21, 1946) is a Canadian mathematician who specializes in singularity theory, analytic geometry, and differential analysis. He is professor emeritus at the University of Toronto.

== Education and career ==
He received his B.Sc. from the University of Toronto and his Ph.D. at Brandeis University in 1972. He was a visiting scholar at the Institute for Advanced Study in the summer of 1973. He served as the Director of the Fields Institute from 2009 to 2013.

== Recognition ==
Bierstone was elected a member of the Royal Society of Canada in 1992 and, together with Pierre Milman, received the Jeffery–Williams Prize in 2005. In 2012, he became a fellow of the American Mathematical Society. In 2018, the Canadian Mathematical Society listed him in their inaugural class of fellows.
