= George Marinescu (mathematician) =

Romanian mathematician

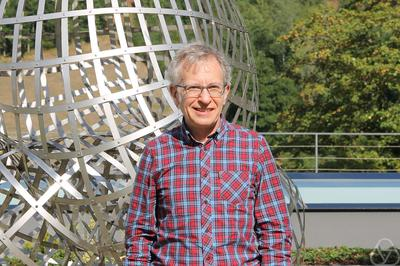
Marinescu at Oberwolfach in 2022

George Marinescu (born 22 June 1965, Brașov) is a Romanian mathematician, specializing in complex geometry, global analysis, and spectral theory.

Marinescu received from the University of Bucharest in 1988 his baccalaureate degree and in 1989 his master's degree. He graduated in 1994 with Ph.D. from Paris Diderot University (University of Paris 7) with thesis under the supervision of Louis Boutet de Monvel. Marinescu was a postdoc from 1997 to 1998 at the University of Edinburgh, from 1998 to 1999 at the Institut de mathématiques de Jussieu, and from 1999 to 2000 at the Humboldt University of Berlin, completing there his habilitation qualification in 2005. He was at the Humboldt University of Berlin an assistant researcher from 2000 to 2005 and is since 2006 a professor at the University of Cologne.

He was awarded, jointly with Xiaonan Ma, the Ferran Sunyer i Balaguer Prize in 2006 for their book "Holomorphic Morse inequalities and Bergman kernels". Marinescu was awarded the Romanian Academy's 2012 Simion Stoilow Prize (with the formal ceremony in 2014).

His son is the scholar of ancient philosophy, Rareș I. Marinescu.
