= Vieri Benci =

Italian mathematician

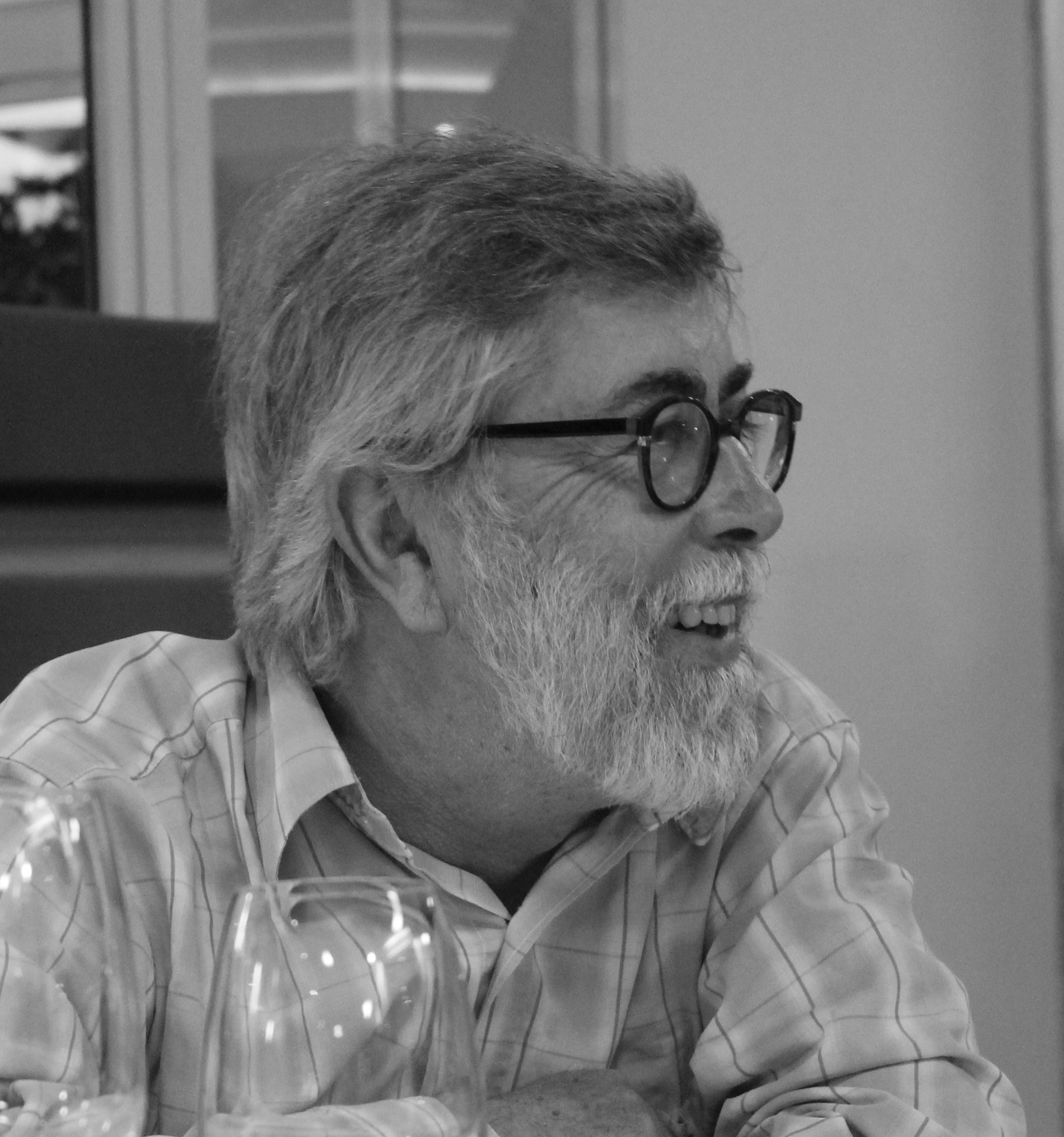
- Born: May 9, 1949 (age 77); Florence
- Education: Scuola Normale Superiore
- Scientific career
- Fields: Mathematics
- Workplaces: University of Pisa; University of Bari
- Doctoral advisor: Guido Stampacchia
- Website: sites.google.com/site/vieribenci2/

Vieri Benci (born May 9, 1949) is an Italian mathematician who worked at the University of Pisa. He has contributed to various fields of mathematics such as the partial differential equations (PDEs), mathematical physics, Hamiltonian dynamics, soliton theory, the geometry of general relativity, nonstandard analysis and the foundations of mathematics. In the latter two disciplines he introduced, in collaboration with M. Di Nasso and M. Forti, a theory of numerosity that refines the cantorian theory of cardinality; he has also worked on applications of nonstandard analysis to probability.

== Education and career ==
After winning the admission competition to the Scuola Normale Superiore in Pisa in 1968, ranking first, he graduated in mathematics in 1972 under the guidance of Guido Stampacchia at the University of Pisa, at the same time obtaining the diploma as a normalist. He continued his studies at the University of Paris VI (1972-74) and at Courant Institute of Mathematical Sciences, New York University (1976-78).

In 1998 he founded the Centro Interdipartimentale per lo Studio dei Sistemi Complessi, which he directed until 2004 when he took over as head of the University's Department of Applied Mathematics (2004-2007).

== Scientific Activity ==
In the field of partial derivative equations, he has contributed to the application of variational and topological methods to find solutions by identifying them as critical points of associated energy functionals. Using tools from topology and functional analysis, he has provided new techniques to prove the existence of multiple solutions of nonlinear partial differential equations, in particular elliptic equations.

These methods have also been applied to certain issues in mathematical physics such as the existence of periodic solutions for Hamiltonian systems and the study of the Schroedinger equation, including work with P. H. Rabinowitz and D. Fortunato. Topological techniques have also been applied to the study of the geometry of space-time in General Relativity. Also in the field of mathematical physics, Benci studied the existence and stability of solitons in nonlinear wave equations and their interaction with Maxwell's equations.

In the field of mathematical foundations, Benci developed a theory of numerosities as an alternative to the traditional set-theoretic approach to infinite sets. This theory aims to assign a ‘size’ to infinite sets in a way that aligns more closely with our intuition of finite sets. The theory of numerosity has also opened up philosophical questions, some of which have been addressed in collaboration with philosophers.

Finally, Benci has been a populariser of Nonstandard Analysis in both theory and engineering applications.

== Awards and honors ==
- 2024 Included in the list of top 100 italian scientists, section: mathematics.
- 2009 Premio Amerio, gold medal, assigned by Istituto Lombardo, Accademia di Scienze e Lettere.
- 2004 Università di Genova Prize, conferred on 5 Novembre 2004, "for having raised the level of recognition of the italian scientific research in the World".
- 2002 Appeared in the ISI Highly Cited List, as one of the most cited researchers.
- 1994 Ordine del Cherubino, title conferred by the University of Pisa.

== Major publications ==
- Variational methods in nonlinear field equations, Benci, Vieri; Fortunato, Donato. Springer, Cham, 2014.
- Modelli e realtà. Una riflessione sulle nozioni di spazio e tempo; Benci, Vieri; Freguglia, Paolo. Bollati Boringhieri, 2011.
- Alla scoperta dei numeri infinitesimi. Lezioni di analisi matematica esposte in un campo non-archimedeo, Benci, Vieri. Aracne, 2018.
- How to measure the infinite, Benci, Vieri; Di Nasso, Mauro. World Scientific, Hackensack, NJ, 2019.
- La matematica e l'infinito. Storia e attualità di un problema, Benci, Vieri; Freguglia, Paolo. Carocci, 2019.

== See also ==
- Nonstandard Analysis
- Numerosity (mathematics)
- Cardinality
