= Xiaonan Ma =

Chinese mathematician

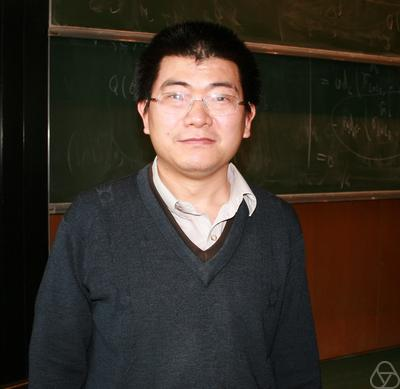
- Born: 1972 (age 53–54); Zhejiang, China
- Education: Wuhan University (BS); Paris-Sud University (PhD)
- Awards: Ferran Sunyer i Balaguer (with George Marinescu), 2006; Sophie Germain Prize, 2017; Gay-Lussac–Humboldt Prize, 2022
- Scientific career
- Fields: Mathematics
- Workplaces: Paris Diderot University; University of California, Santa Cruz; Humboldt University of Berlin
- Doctoral advisor: Jean-Michel Bismut

Xiaonan Ma (Chinese: 麻小南; pinyin: Má Xiǎonán; born 1972) is a Chinese mathematician working in global analysis and local index theory.

== Early life and education ==
Ma was born in 1972 in Zhejiang, China. He graduated high school with a maths score of 117 out of 120.

Ma obtained his bachelor degree from Wuhan University. He then received his Ph.D. in 1998 under the direction of Jean-Michel Bismut at Paris-Sud University with a thesis entitled Formes de torsion analytique et familles de submersions.

== Career ==
Ma was a researcher at the French National Centre for Scientific Research from 2001 to 2007, working at the Centre de mathématiques Laurent-Schwartz of École Polytechnique. After the habilitation in 2005 (Théorie de l'indice local et applications) he became a professor at the University Paris VII (Denis Diderot) in 2007.

Ma had a postdoctoral position in the group of Jochen Brüning at the Humboldt University of Berlin and was visiting Professor at the University of California, Santa Cruz. He was junior member of the Institut universitaire de France from 2009 to 2014. He is member of the international Faculty of the University of Cologne.

In October 2024, it was reported that Ma would join Nankai University where he will serve as chair professor at the Chern Institute of Mathematics.

== Research ==
The research themes of Ma encompass global analysis and local Atiyah–Singer–index theory (analytic Ray–Singer torsion, Eta forms, elliptic genera), Bergman kernels and geometric quantization. He is editor of Science in China A (Mathematics) and of International Journal of Mathematics.

== Awards ==
Ma was awarded together with George Marinescu the Ferran Sunyer i Balaguer Prize in 2006 for the book "Holomorphic Morse inequalities and Bergman kernels". He was an invited speaker at the International Congress of Mathematicians in Hyderabad 2010 (Geometric quantization on Kähler and symplectic Manifolds). Ma received in 2017 the Sophie Germain Prize. He received in 2022 the Gay-Lussac-Humboldt Prize

== Works ==
=== Books ===
- with G. Marinescu: Holomorphic Morse inequalities and Bergman kernels, Birkhäuser, Progress in Mathematics 254, 2007. ISBN 978-3-7643-8096-0
- with W. Zhang: Bergman kernels and symplectic reduction, Astérisque, tome 318, 2008. ISBN 978-2-85629-255-6
- editor with X. Dai, R. Léandre, W. Zhang: From Probability to Geometry. Volume in honor of the 60th birthday of Jean-Michel Bismut, 2 vols., Astérisque 327, 328, 2009. ISBN 978-2-85629-288-4
- editor with Jean-Benoit Bost, Helmut Hofer, Francois Labourie, Yves Le Jan, Weiping Zhang: Geometry, analysis and probability – in honor of Jean-Michel Bismut, Progress in Mathematics 310, Birkhäuser 2017. ISBN 978-3-319-49638-2

=== Articles ===
- Ma, X. (1999). "Formes de torsion analytique et familles de submersions". Bulletin de la Société Mathématique de France. 127 (4): 541–562. doi:10.24033/bsmf.2360.
- Liu, K.; Ma, X. (1999). "On family rigidity theorems, I". Duke Mathematical Journal. 102 (3): 451–474. arXiv:math/9910047. Bibcode:1999math.....10047L. doi:10.1215/S0012-7094-00-10234-7. S2CID 12977793.
- Ma, X. (2005). "Orbifolds and analytic torsions". Transactions of the American Mathematical Society. 357 (6): 2205–2234. doi:10.1090/S0002-9947-05-03847-X.
- Dai, X.; Liu, K.; Ma, X. (2006). "Asymptotic expansion of the Bergman kernel". Journal of Differential Geometry. 72: 1–41. arXiv:math/0404494. doi:10.4310/jdg/1143593124.
- Brüning, J.; Ma, X. (2006). "An anomaly formula for Ray–Singer metrics on manifolds with boundary". Geometric and Functional Analysis. 16 (4): 767–837. doi:10.1007/s00039-006-0574-7. S2CID 122144793.
- Ma, X.; Marinescu, G. (2004). "Generalized Bergman kernels on symplectic manifolds". Advances in Mathematics. 217 (4): 1756–1815. arXiv:math/0411559. doi:10.1016/j.aim.2007.10.008. S2CID 14191452.
- Ma, X.; Marinescu, G. (2008). "Toeplitz operators on symplectic manifolds". Journal of Geometric Analysis. 18 (2): 565–611. arXiv:0806.2370. doi:10.1007/s12220-008-9022-2. S2CID 17309660.
- Ma, X.; Marinescu, G. (2012). "Berezin-Toeplitz quantization on Kähler manifolds". Journal für die Reine und Angewandte Mathematik. 662: 1–56. arXiv:1009.4405. doi:10.1515/CRELLE.2011.133. S2CID 119605192.
