= Timothy Browning =

British mathematician

Timothy Daniel Browning
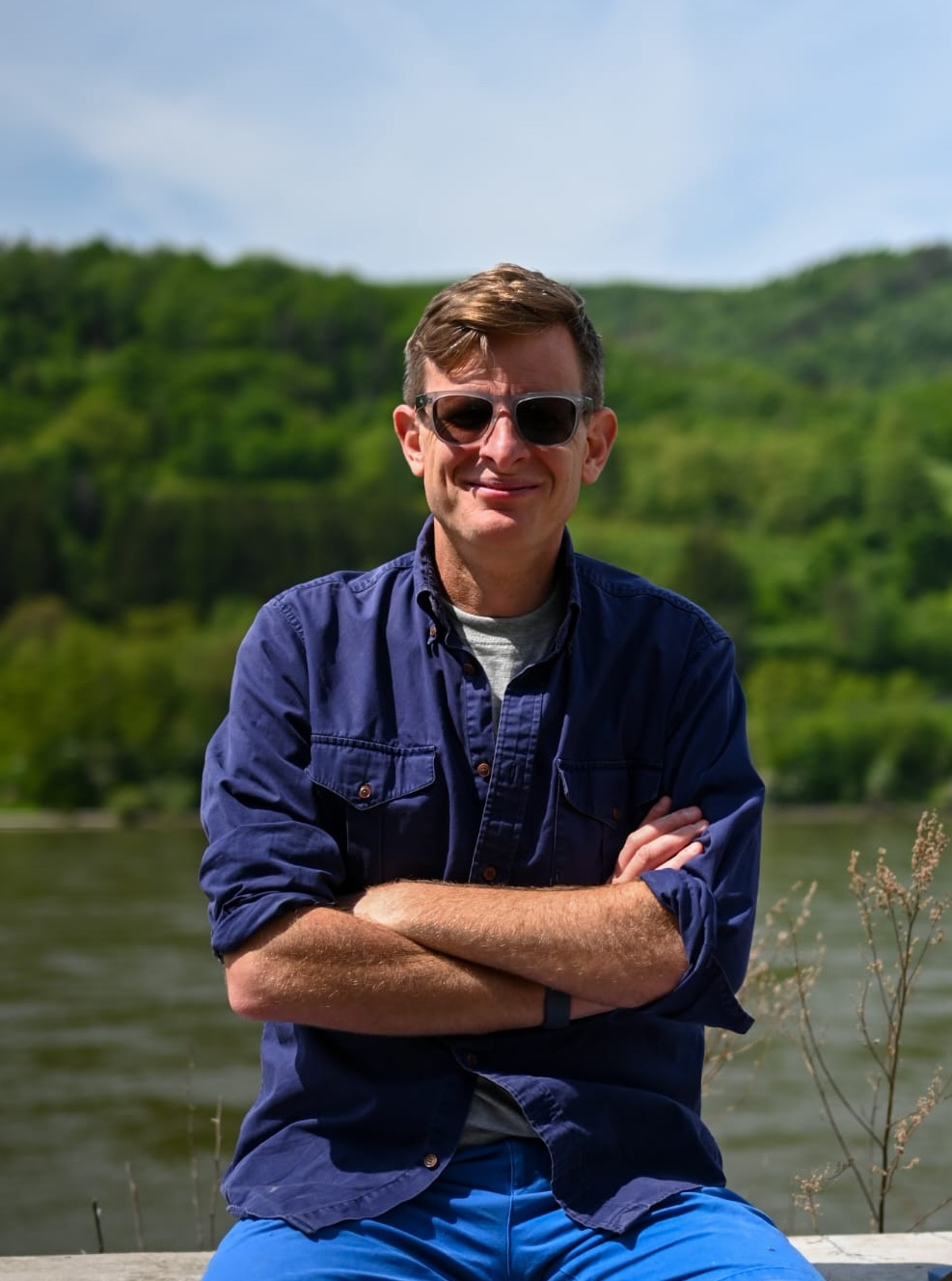
- Browning in 2024
- Born: 28 February 1976 (age 50); Kingston-upon-Thames, England
- Education: University of Oxford
- Awards: Whitehead Prize (2008); Leverhulme Prize; Ferran Sunyer i Balaguer Prize
- Scientific career
- Fields: Mathematics
- Workplaces: Institute of Science and Technology Austria
- Thesis: Counting rational points on curves and surfaces (2002)
- Doctoral advisor: Roger Heath-Brown

Tim Browning MAE is a mathematician working in number theory, examining the interface of analytic number theory and Diophantine geometry. Browning is currently a Professor of number theory at the Institute of Science and Technology Austria (ISTA) in Klosterneuburg, Austria.

== Awards ==
In 2008, Browning was awarded the Whitehead Prize by the London Mathematical Society for his significant contributions on the interface of analytic number theory and arithmetic geometry concerning the number and distribution of rational and integral solutions to Diophantine equations.

In 2009 and in 2021, Browning won the Ferran Sunyer i Balaguer Prize. The prize is awarded for a mathematical monograph of an expository nature presenting the latest developments in an active area of research in Mathematics, in which the applicant has made important contributions. Browning won the prize for his monograph Quantitative Arithmetic of Projective Varieties in 2009 and for the book Cubic forms and the circle method in 2021.

In 2010, Browning was awarded the Leverhulme Mathematics Prize for his work on number theory and diophantine geometry.

In 2022, Browning was elected a member of the Academia Europaea.

== Publications ==
- "MathSciNet".
- "ArXiv".
- Browning, Tim. "Publications".
