= Rosa M. Miró-Roig =

Spanish mathematician and professor

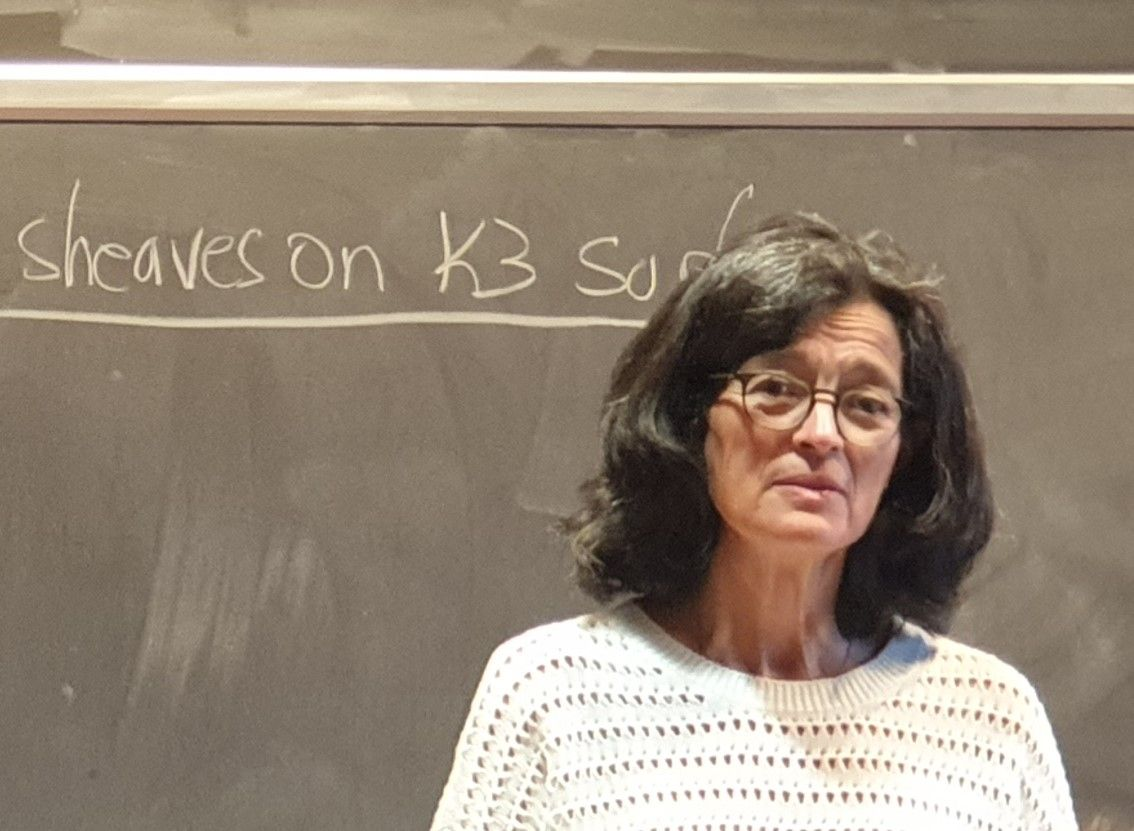
Image of Rosa Maria Miró-Roig

Rosa M. Miró-Roig (born August 6, 1960) is a professor of mathematics at the University of Barcelona, specializing in algebraic geometry and commutative algebra. She did her graduate studies at the University of Barcelona, earning a Ph.D. in 1985 under the supervision of Sebastià Xambó-Descamps with the thesis Haces reflexivos sobre espacios proyectivos.

== Books and editing ==
Miró-Roig has authored and co-authored three mathematics research volumes. Most recently, she co-authored On the Shape of a Pure O-sequence (American Mathematical Society 2012) with Mats Boij, Juan C. Migliore, Uwe Nagel, and Fabrizio Zanello. Previously, she authored the research text Determinantal Ideals (Birkhäuser 2007) and co-authored the monograph Gorenstein Liaison, Complete Intersection Liaison Invariants and Unobstructedness (American Mathematical Society 2001) with Jan O. Kleppe, Juan C. Migliore, Uwe Nagel, and Chris Peterson.

Miró-Roig is the editor-in-chief of the mathematics research journal Collectanea Mathematica (Springer).

She co-edited the mathematics research volumes Projective Varieties with Unexpected Properties (De Gruyter 2008) with Ciro Ciliberto, Antony V. Geramita, Brian Harbourne, and Kristian Ranestad, European Congress of Mathematics: Barcelona, July 10–14, 2000 (Birkhäuser 2001) two volumes with Carles Casacuberta, Joan Verdera, and Sebastià Xambó-Descamps, Six Lectures on Commutative Algebra (Birkhäuser 1998) with J. Elias, J. M. Giral, and S. Zarzuela, and Complex Analysis and Geometry (Chapman and Hall/CRC 1997) with V. Ancona, E. Ballico, and A. Silva.

== Recognition ==
In 2007, Miró-Roig was awarded the Ferran Sunyer i Balaguer Prize for her work "Determinantal Ideals (Birkhäuser, 2007)".
