= Capacity of a set =

In Euclidean space, a measure of that set's "size"

In mathematics, the capacity of a set in Euclidean space is a measure of the "size" of that set. Unlike, say, Lebesgue measure, which measures a set's volume or physical extent, capacity is a mathematical analogue of a set's ability to hold electrical charge. More precisely, it is the capacitance of the set: the total charge a set can hold while maintaining a given potential energy. The potential energy is computed with respect to an idealized ground at infinity for the harmonic or Newtonian capacity, and with respect to a surface for the condenser capacity.

== Historical note ==
The notion of capacity of a set and of "capacitable" set was introduced by Gustave Choquet in 1950: for a detailed account, see reference (Choquet 1986).

== Definitions ==
=== Condenser capacity ===
Let Σ be a closed, smooth, (n − 1)-dimensional hypersurface in n-dimensional Euclidean space $\mathbb{R}^n$, n ≥ 3; K will denote the n-dimensional compact (i.e., closed and bounded) set of which Σ is the boundary. Let S be another (n − 1)-dimensional hypersurface that encloses Σ: in reference to its origins in electromagnetism, the pair (Σ, S) is known as a condenser. The condenser capacity of Σ relative to S, denoted C(Σ, S) or cap(Σ, S), is given by the surface integral

$$C(\Sigma, S) = - \frac1{(n - 2) \sigma_{n}} \int_{S'} \frac{\partial u}{\partial \nu}\,\mathrm{d}\sigma',$$

where:

- u is the unique harmonic function defined on the region D between Σ and S with the boundary conditions u(x) = 1 on Σ and u(x) = 0 on S;
- S′ is any intermediate surface between Σ and S;
- $\nu$ is the outward unit normal field to S′ and

$$\frac{\partial u}{\partial \nu} (x) = \nabla u (x) \cdot \nu (x)$$

is the normal derivative of u across S′; and

- σ_{n} = 2π ^{n/2} / Γ(n / 2) is the surface area of the unit sphere in $\mathbb{R}^n$.

C(Σ, S) can be equivalently defined by the volume integral

$$C(\Sigma, S) = \frac1{(n - 2) \sigma_{n}} \int_{D} | \nabla u |^{2}\mathrm{d}x.$$

The condenser capacity also has a variational characterization: C(Σ, S) is the infimum of the Dirichlet's energy functional

$$I[v] = \frac1{(n - 2) \sigma_{n}} \int_{D} | \nabla v |^{2}\mathrm{d}x$$

over all continuously differentiable functions v on D with v(x) = 1 on Σ and v(x) = 0 on S.

=== Harmonic capacity ===
Heuristically, the harmonic capacity of K, the region bounded by Σ, can be found by taking the condenser capacity of Σ with respect to infinity. More precisely, let u be the harmonic function in the complement of K satisfying u = 1 on Σ and u(x) → 0 as x → ∞. Thus u is the Newtonian potential of the simple layer Σ. Then the harmonic capacity or Newtonian capacity of K, denoted C(K) or cap(K), is then defined by

$$C(K) = \int_{\mathbb{R}^n\setminus K} |\nabla u|^2\mathrm{d}x.$$

If S is a rectifiable hypersurface completely enclosing K, then the harmonic capacity can be equivalently rewritten as the integral over S of the outward normal derivative of u:

$$C(K) = \int_S \frac{\partial u}{\partial\nu}\,\mathrm{d}\sigma.$$

The harmonic capacity can also be understood as a limit of the condenser capacity. To wit, let S_{r} denote the sphere of radius r about the origin in $\mathbb{R}^n$. Since K is bounded, for sufficiently large r, S_{r} will enclose K and (Σ, S_{r}) will form a condenser pair. The harmonic capacity is then the limit as r tends to infinity:

$$C(K) = \lim_{r \to \infty} C(\Sigma, S_{r}).$$

The harmonic capacity is a mathematically abstract version of the electrostatic capacity of the conductor K and is always non-negative and finite: 0 ≤ C(K) < +∞.

The Wiener capacity or Robin constant W(K) of K is given by

$$C(K) = e^{-W(K)}$$

=== Logarithmic capacity ===
In two dimensions, the capacity is defined as above, but dropping the factor of $(n-2)$ in the definition:

$$C(\Sigma, S)
= - \frac1{2\pi} \int_{S'} \frac{\partial u}{\partial \nu}\,\mathrm{d}\sigma'
= \frac1{2\pi} \int_{D} | \nabla u |^{2}\mathrm{d}x$$

This is often called the logarithmic capacity, the term logarithmic arises, as the potential function goes from being an inverse power to a logarithm in the $n\to 2$ limit. This is articulated below. It may also be called the conformal capacity, in reference to its relation to the conformal radius.

== Properties ==
The harmonic function u is called the capacity potential. It is called the Newtonian potential when $n \ge 3$ and called the logarithmic potential when $n=2$. It can be obtained via a Green's function G as

$$u(x)=\int_S G(x-y)d\mu(y)$$

with x a point exterior to S, where G is defined as

$$G(x-y)=\frac1{|x-y|^{n-2}}$$

when $n\ge 3$ and

$$G(x-y)=\log\frac1{|x-y|}$$

for $n=2$.

The measure $\mu$ is called the capacitary measure or equilibrium measure. It is generally taken to be a Borel measure. It is related to the capacity as

$$C(K)=\int_Sd\mu(y)=\mu(S)$$

The variational definition of capacity over the Dirichlet energy can be re-expressed as

$$C(K)=\left[\inf_\lambda E(\lambda)\right]^{-1}$$

with the infimum taken over all positive Borel measures $\lambda$ concentrated on K, normalized so that $\lambda(K)=1$ and with $E(\lambda)$ is the energy integral

$$E(\lambda)=\int\int_{K\times K} G(x-y) d\lambda(x) d\lambda(y)$$

== Generalizations ==
The characterization of the capacity of a set as the minimum of an energy functional achieving particular boundary values, given above, can be extended to other energy functionals in the calculus of variations.

=== Divergence form elliptic operators ===
Solutions to a uniformly elliptic partial differential equation with divergence form

$$\nabla \cdot ( A \nabla u ) = 0$$

are minimizers of the associated energy functional

$$I[u] = \int_D (\nabla u)^T A (\nabla u)\,\mathrm{d}x$$

subject to appropriate boundary conditions.

The capacity of a set E with respect to a domain D containing E is defined as the infimum of the energy over all continuously differentiable functions v on D with v(x) = 1 on E; and v(x) = 0 on the boundary of D.

The minimum energy is achieved by a function known as the capacitary potential of E with respect to D, and it solves the obstacle problem on D with the obstacle function provided by the indicator function of E. The capacitary potential is alternately characterized as the unique solution of the equation with the appropriate boundary conditions.

== See also ==
- Analytic capacity – Concept in complex analysis
- Conformal radius
- Capacitance – Ability of a body to store an electrical charge
- Newtonian potential – Green's function for Laplacian
- Potential theory – Harmonic functions as solutions to Laplace's equation
- Choquet theory – Area of functional analysis and convex analysis
