= Serena Dipierro =

Italian mathematician

Serena Dipierro is an Italian mathematician whose research involves partial differential equations, the regularity of their solution, their phase transitions, nonlocal operators, and free boundary problems, with applications including population dynamics, quantum mechanics, crystallography, and mathematical finance. She is a professor in the School of Physics, Mathematics and Computing at the University of Western Australia, where she heads the department of mathematics and statistics.

== Education and career ==
After earning a laurea at the University of Bari in 2006, and a master's degree with Lorenzo D’Ambrosio at the same university in 2008, Dipierro finished a Ph.D. in mathematics at the International School for Advanced Studies in Trieste in 2012. Her dissertation, Concentration phenomena for singularly perturbed elliptic problems and related topics, was supervised by Andrea Malchiodi.

She was a postdoctoral researcher at the University of Chile and University of Edinburgh, and a Humboldt Fellow, and a faculty member at the University of Melbourne and University of Milan before taking her present position at the University of Western Australia in 2018.

== Book ==
With María Medina de la Torre and Enrico Valdinoci, Dipierro is a coauthor of the monograph Fractional Elliptic Problems with Critical Growth in the Whole of $\mathbb{R}^n$ (arXiv:1506.01748; Edizioni Della Normale, 2017).

== Recognition ==
- 2021 Australian Mathematical Society Medal.
- 2024 Christopher Heyde Medal, Australian Academy of Science
