= Morse–Palais lemma =

In mathematics, the Morse–Palais lemma is a result in the calculus of variations and theory of Hilbert spaces. Roughly speaking, it states that a smooth enough function near a critical point can be expressed as a quadratic form after a suitable change of coordinates.

The Morse–Palais lemma was originally proved in the finite-dimensional case by the American mathematician Marston Morse, using the Gram–Schmidt orthogonalization process. This result plays a crucial role in Morse theory. The generalization to Hilbert spaces is due to Richard Palais and Stephen Smale.

== Statement of the lemma ==
Let $(H, \langle \cdot ,\cdot \rangle)$ be a real Hilbert space, and let $U$ be an open neighbourhood of the origin in $H.$ Let $f : U \to \R$ be a $(k+2)$-times continuously differentiable function with $k \geq 1;$ that is, $f \in C^{k+2}(U; \R).$ Assume that $f(0) = 0$ and that $0$ is a non-degenerate critical point of $f;$ that is, the second derivative $D^2 f(0)$ defines an isomorphism of $H$ with its continuous dual space $H^*$ by $H \ni x \mapsto \mathrm{D}^2 f(0) (x, -) \in H^*.$

Then there exists a subneighbourhood $V$ of $0$ in $U,$ a diffeomorphism $\varphi : V \to V$ that is $C^k$ with $C^k$ inverse, and an invertible symmetric operator $A : H \to H,$ such that $f(x) = \langle A \varphi(x), \varphi(x) \rangle \quad \text{ for all } x \in V.$

== Corollary ==
Let $f : U \to \R$ be $f \in C^{k+2}$ such that $0$ is a non-degenerate critical point. Then there exists a $C^k$-with-$C^k$-inverse diffeomorphism $\psi : V \to V$ and an orthogonal decomposition $H = G \oplus G^{\perp},$ such that, if one writes $\psi (x) = y + z \quad \mbox{ with } y \in G, z \in G^{\perp},$ then $f (\psi(x)) = \langle y, y \rangle - \langle z, z \rangle \quad \text{ for all } x \in V.$

== See also ==
- Fréchet derivative – Derivative defined on normed spaces
