= Palais–Smale compactness condition =

The Palais–Smale compactness condition, named after Richard Palais and Stephen Smale, is a hypothesis for some theorems of the calculus of variations. It is useful for guaranteeing the existence of certain kinds of critical points, in particular saddle points. The Palais-Smale condition is a condition on the functional that one is trying to extremize.

In finite-dimensional spaces, the Palais–Smale condition for a continuously differentiable real-valued function is satisfied automatically for proper maps: functions which do not take unbounded sets into bounded sets. In the calculus of variations, where one is typically interested in infinite-dimensional function spaces, the condition is necessary because some extra notion of compactness beyond simple boundedness is needed. See, for example, the proof of the mountain pass theorem in section 8.5 of Evans.

== Strong formulation ==
A continuously Fréchet differentiable functional $I\in C^1(H,\mathbb{R})$ from a Hilbert space H to the reals satisfies the Palais–Smale condition if every sequence $\{u_k\}_{k=1}^\infty\subset H$ such that:

- $\{I[u_k]\}_{k=1}^\infty$ is bounded, and
- $I'[u_k]\rightarrow 0$ in H

has a convergent subsequence in H.

== Weak formulation ==
Let X be a Banach space and $\Phi\colon X\to\mathbf R$ be a Gateaux differentiable functional. The functional $\Phi$ is said to satisfy the weak Palais–Smale condition if for each sequence $\{x_n\}\subset X$ such that

- $\sup |\Phi(x_n)|<\infty$,
- $\lim\Phi'(x_n)=0$ in $X^*$,
- $\Phi(x_n)\neq0$ for all $n\in\mathbf N$,

there exists a critical point $\overline x\in X$ of $\Phi$ with

$$\liminf\Phi(x_n)\le\Phi(\overline x)\le\limsup\Phi(x_n).$$
