= Pertti Mattila =

Finnish mathematician (born 1948)

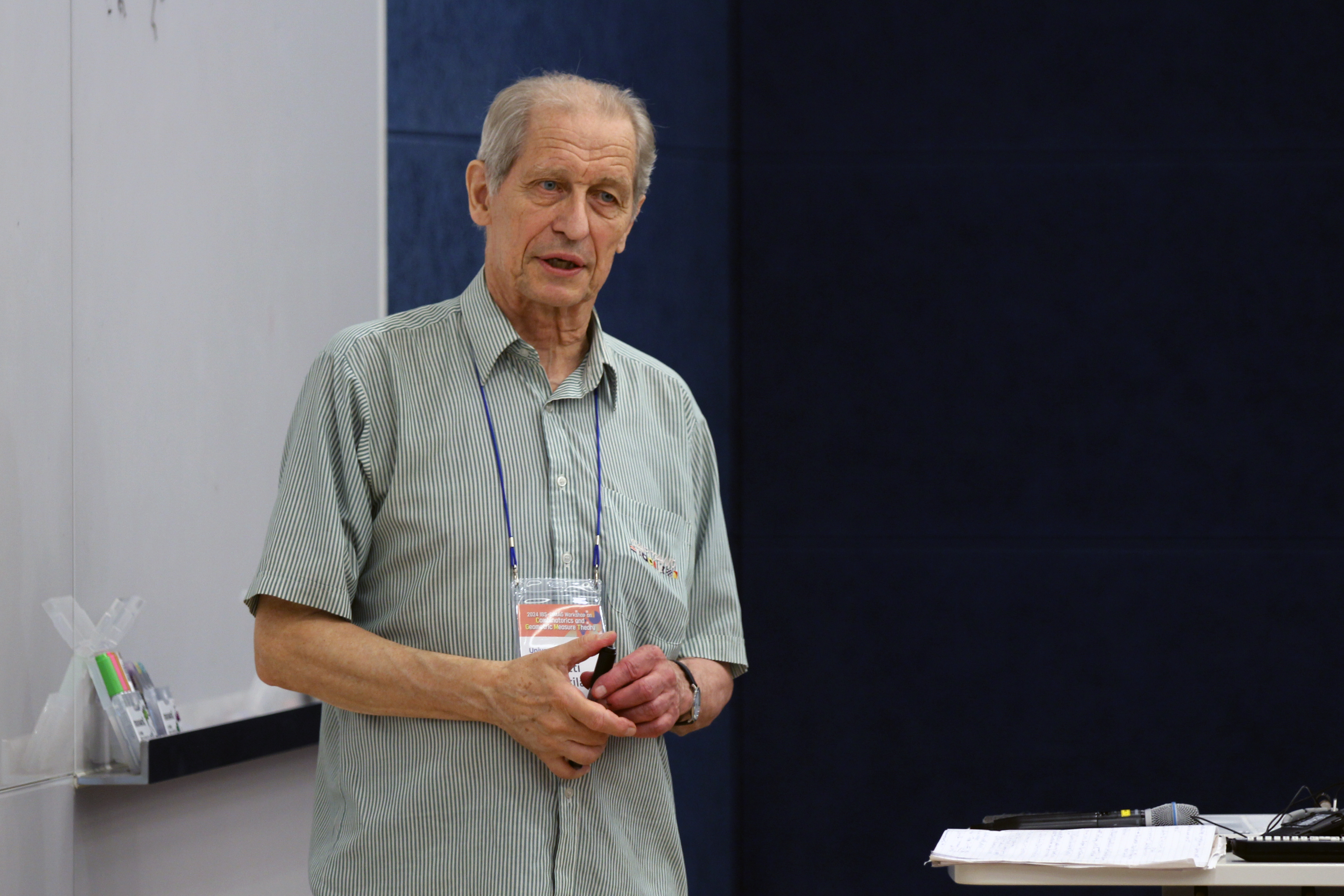
- Born: 28 March 1948 (age 78); Kuusankoski, Finland
- Education: University of Helsinki
- Known for: Geometric measure theory
- Awards: Magnus Ehrnrooth Foundation Prize (2000)
- Scientific career
- Fields: Mathematics
- Workplaces: Princeton University, University of Jyväskylä, University of Helsinki
- Thesis: Integration in a Space of Measures (1973)
- Doctoral advisor: Jussi Väisälä
- Doctoral students: 16 Ph.D. students

Pertti Esko Juhani Mattila (born 28 March 1948) is a Finnish mathematician working in geometric measure theory, complex analysis and harmonic analysis. He is Professor of Mathematics in the Department of Mathematics and Statistics at the University of Helsinki, Finland.

He is known for his work on geometric measure theory and in particular applications to complex analysis and harmonic analysis. His work include a counterexample to the general Vitushkin's conjecture and with Mark Melnikov and Joan Verdera he introduced new techniques to understand the geometric structure of removable sets for complex analytic functions which together with other works in the field eventually led to the solution of Painlevé's problem by Xavier Tolsa.

His book Geometry of Sets and Measures in Euclidean Spaces: Fractals and Rectifiability is now a widely cited and a standard textbook in this field. Mattila has been the leading figure on creating the geometric measure theory school in Finland and the Mathematics Genealogy Project cites he has supervised so far 15 PhD students in the field.

He obtained his PhD from the University of Helsinki under the supervision of Jussi Väisälä in 1973. He worked at the Institute for Advanced Study at the Princeton University for postdoctoral research in 1979 and from 1989 as Professor of Mathematics at the University of Jyväskylä, until appointed as Professor of Mathematics at the University of Helsinki in 2003. In 1998 he was an Invited Speaker of the International Congress of Mathematicians in Berlin. Mattila was the director of the Academy of Finland funded Centre of Excellence of Geometric Analysis and Mathematical Physics from 2002 to 2007 and currently part of the Centre of Excellence in Analysis and Dynamics Research in the University of Helsinki.

== Bibliography ==
- Mattila, Pertti (1995). Geometry of Sets and Measures in Euclidean Spaces: Fractals and Rectifiability. Cambridge University Press.
