= Isoparametric manifold =

Topological space

In Riemannian geometry, an isoparametric manifold is a type of (immersed) submanifold of Euclidean space whose normal bundle is flat and whose principal curvatures are constant along any parallel normal vector field. The set of isoparametric manifolds is stable under the mean curvature flow.

== Examples ==
A straight line in the plane is an obvious example of isoparametric manifold. Any affine subspace of the Euclidean n-dimensional space is also an example since the principal curvatures of any shape operator are zero. Another simplest example of an isoparametric manifold is a sphere in Euclidean space.

Another example is as follows. Suppose that G is a Lie group and G/H is a symmetric space with canonical decomposition

$$\mathbf{g} = \mathbf{h}\oplus\mathbf{p}$$

of the Lie algebra g of G into a direct sum (orthogonal with respect to the Killing form) of the Lie algebra h or H with a complementary subspace p. Then a principal orbit of the adjoint representation of H on p is an isoparametric manifold in p. Non principal orbits are examples of the so-called submanifolds with principal constant curvatures. Actually, by Thorbergsson's theorem any complete, full and irreducible isoparametric submanifold of codimension > 2 is an orbit of a s-representation, i.e. an H-orbit as above where the symmetric space G/H has no flat factor.

The theory of isoparametric submanifolds is deeply related to the theory of holonomy groups. Actually, any isoparametric submanifold is foliated by the holonomy tubes of a submanifold with constant principal curvatures i.e. a focal submanifold. The paper "Submanifolds with constant principal curvatures and normal holonomy groups" is a very good introduction to such theory. For more detailed explanations about holonomy tubes and focalizations see the book Submanifolds and Holonomy.

== See also ==
- Isoparametric function
