= Richard Palais =

American mathematician (1931–2026)

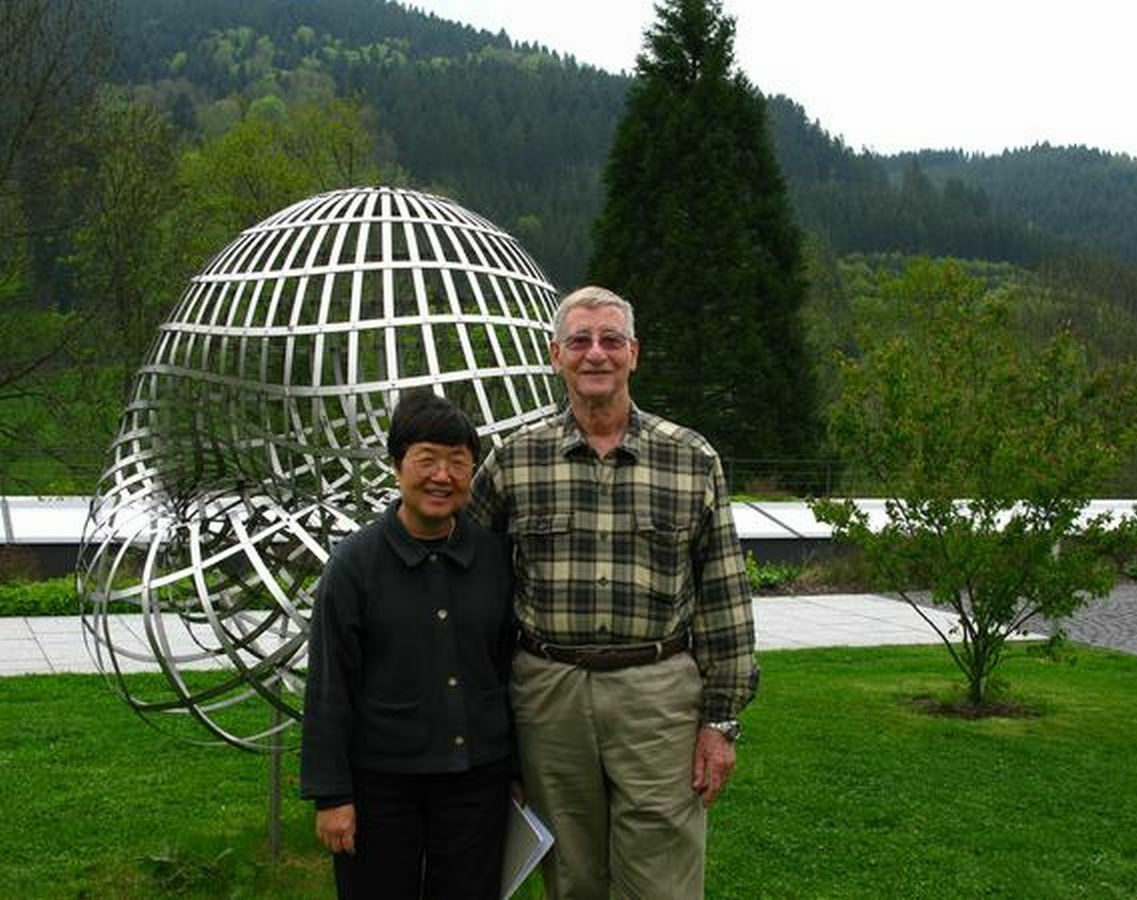
- Palais (right) and Chuu-Lian Terng (left) at Oberwolfach, 2010
- Born: May 22, 1931; Lynn, Massachusetts, U.S.
- Died: May 13, 2026 (aged 94); Irvine, California, U.S.
- Education: Harvard University (BA, MA, PhD)
- Known for: Mostow–Palais theorem Lie–Palais theorem Morse–Palais lemma Palais–Smale compactness condition
- Spouse: Chuu-Lian Terng
- Awards: Sloan Research Fellowship (1965); Lester R. Ford Award (2010)
- Scientific career
- Workplaces: Brandeis University; University of California, Irvine
- Thesis: A Global Formulation of the Lie Theory of Transformation Groups (1956)
- Doctoral advisor: Andrew Gleason; George Mackey
- Doctoral students: Edward Bierstone; Leslie Lamport; Jill P. Mesirov; Chuu-lian Terng; Karen Uhlenbeck

Richard Sheldon Palais (May 22, 1931 – May 13, 2026) was an American mathematician working in differential geometry.

== Education and career ==
Palais studied at Harvard University, where he obtained a B.A. in 1952, an M.A. in 1954 and a Ph.D. in 1956. His PhD thesis, entitled A Global Formulation of the Lie Theory of Transformation Groups, was supervised by Andrew M. Gleason and George Mackey.

Palais was a postdoctoral researcher at University of Chicago from 1956 to 1958 and at the Institute for Advanced Study from 1958 to 1960. He moved then to Brandeis University, where he worked as assistant professor in 1960–1962, as associate professor in 1962-1965 and as full professor from 1965 until his retirement in 2003. From 2004 he was an adjunct professor at the University of California, Irvine.

Palais was awarded a Sloan Fellowship in 1965. In 1970, he was an invited speaker at the International Congress of Mathematicians in Nice. From 1965 to 1982 he was an editor for the Journal of Differential Geometry and from 1966 to 1969 an editor for the Transactions of the American Mathematical Society. In 1979 he co-founded the TeX Users Group and became its first president.

In 1980, Palais was elected a fellow of the American Association for the Advancement of Science and in 2012 a fellow of the American Mathematical Society. In 2006 he was awarded the first prize, together with Luc Bénard, for the NSF/Science Visualization Challenge and in 2010 he received a Lester R. Ford Award.

Palais died on May 13, 2026, at the age of 94.

== Research ==
Palais' research interests included differential geometry, the theory of compact differentiable groups of transformations, the geometry of submanifolds, Morse theory and non-linear global analysis. In particular, he is known for the principle of symmetric criticality, the Mostow–Palais theorem, the Lie–Palais theorem, the Morse–Palais lemma, and the Palais–Smale compactness condition. Since the 1990s he worked on the theory of solitons and mathematical visualization.

His doctoral students include Edward Bierstone, Leslie Lamport, Jill P. Mesirov, Chuu-lian Terng, and Karen Uhlenbeck.

== Selected publications ==
=== Books ===
As editor:

- Seminar on the Atiyah-Singer Index Theorem, Annals of Mathematics Studies, no. 4, Princeton Univ. Press, 1964

As author:

- A Global Formulation of the Lie Theory of Transformation Groups, Memoirs AMS 1957
- The classification of G-Spaces, Memoirs AMS 1960
- Foundations of Global Nonlinear Analysis, Benjamin 1968
- The geometrization of physics, Tsinghua University Press 1981
- Real algebraic differential topology, Publish or Perish 1981
- with Chuu-Lian Terng: Critical point theory and submanifold geometry, Lecture Notes in Mathematics, vol.1353, Springer 1988
- with Robert A. Palais: Differential Equations, Mechanics, and Computation, AMS 2009

=== Articles ===
- Richard Palais and Stephen Smale, A generalized Morse theory, Research Announcement, Bulletin of the American Mathematical Society 70 (1964), 165–172
- R. Palais, Morse Theory on Hilbert Manifolds, Topology 2 (1963), 299–340.
- R. Palais, Linear and Nonlinear Waves and Solitons, in The Princeton Companion to Mathematics, T. Gower Ed., Princeton Univ. Press 2008, 234-239 ()
- R. Palais, The Symmetries of Solitons, Bulletin. Amer. Math. Soc., New Series 34, No. 4, 339-403 (1997) [ISSN 0273-0979], ()
- R. Palais, The Visualization of Mathematics: Towards a Mathematical Exploratorium, Notices Amer. Math. Soc., 46, No. 6 (June–July 1999, ()
- R. Palais, A Simple Proof of the Banach Contraction Principle, The Journal for Fixed Point Theory and its Applications, 2 (2007) 221–223, ()

A nearly complete list of all papers authored or co-authored by Richard Palais is available for downloading as PDF files at his website.
