= Lie–Palais theorem =

Theorem in differential geometry

In differential geometry, a field of mathematics, the Lie–Palais theorem is a partial converse to the fact that any smooth action of a Lie group induces an infinitesimal action of its Lie algebra. Palais (1957) proved it as a global form of an earlier local theorem due to Sophus Lie.

== Statement ==
Let $\mathfrak{g}$ be a finite-dimensional Lie algebra and $M$ a closed manifold, i.e. a compact smooth manifold without boundary. Then any infinitesimal action $a: \mathfrak{g} \to \mathfrak{X}(M)$ of $\mathfrak{g}$ on $M$ can be integrated to a smooth action of a finite-dimensional Lie group $G$, i.e. there is a smooth action $\Phi: G \times M \to M$ such that $a (\alpha) = d_e \Phi (\cdot,x) (\alpha)$ for every $\alpha \in \mathfrak{g}$.

If $M$ is a manifold with boundary, the statement holds true if the action $a$ preserves the boundary; in other words, the vector fields on the boundary must be tangent to the boundary.

== Counterexamples ==
The example of the vector field $d/dx$ on the open unit interval shows that the result is false for non-compact manifolds.

Similarly, without the assumption that the Lie algebra is finite-dimensional, the result can be false. Milnor (1984, p. 1048) gives the following example due to Omori: consider the Lie algebra $\mathfrak{g}$ of vector fields of the form $f(x,y) \partial/\partial x + g(x,y) \partial/\partial y$ acting on the torus $M = \mathbb{R}^2/\mathbb{Z}^2$ such that $g (x,y) = 0$ for $0 \leq x \leq 1/2$. This Lie algebra is not the Lie algebra of any group.

== Infinite-dimensional generalization ==
Pestov (1995) gives an infinite-dimensional generalization of the Lie–Palais theorem for Banach–Lie algebras with finite-dimensional center.
