= Isoparametric function =

In differential geometry, an isoparametric function is a function on a Riemannian manifold whose level surfaces are parallel and of constant mean curvatures. They were introduced by Cartan (1938).

== See also ==
- Isoparametric manifold
