= T(1) theorem =

In mathematics, the T(1) theorem, first proved by David & Journé (1984), describes when an operator T given by a kernel can be extended to a bounded linear operator on the Hilbert space L^{2}(R^{n}). The name T(1) theorem refers to a condition on the distribution T(1), given by the operator T applied to the function 1.

== Statement ==
Suppose that T is a continuous operator from Schwartz functions on R^{n} to tempered distributions, so that T is given by a kernel K which is a distribution. Assume that the kernel is standard, which means that off the diagonal it is given by a function satisfying certain conditions. Then the T(1) theorem states that T can be extended to a bounded operator on the Hilbert space L^{2}(R^{n}) if and only if the following conditions are satisfied:

- T(1) is of bounded mean oscillation (where T is extended to an operator on bounded smooth functions, such as 1).
- T^{*}(1) is of bounded mean oscillation, where T^{*} is the adjoint of T.
- T is weakly bounded, a weak condition that is easy to verify in practice.
