= Numerosity (mathematics) =

Concept relating to infinite sets

The numerosity of an infinite set, as initially introduced by the Italian mathematician Vieri Benci and later on extended with the help of Mauro Di Nasso and Marco Forti, is a concept that develops Cantor’s notion of cardinality. While Cantor’s classical cardinality classifies sets based on the existence of a one-to-one correspondence with other sets (defining, for example, $\aleph_0$ for countable sets, $\aleph_1$ and so on for larger infinities), the idea of numerosity aims to provide an alternative viewpoint, linking to the common Euclidean notion that "the whole is greater than the part". All of this naturally leads to the hypernatural numbers.

In short, Benci and his collaborators propose associating with an infinite set a numerical value that more directly reflects its “number of elements”, without resorting solely to one-to-one correspondences. This approach uses tools from logic and analysis, seeking to give an operational meaning to the notion of “counting” even when dealing with infinite sets. Numerosity thus proves useful for the study of certain problems in discrete mathematics and is the subject of research within alternative (or complementary) theories to traditional Cantorian cardinality.

== Main axioms ==
In simplified terms, to define a numerosity one assumes the following:

- A set (or class) of “labelled” sets:
  - The labelling of a set $A$ is a function $\ell : A \to \mathbb{N}$ that is finite-to-one.
  - For every $n \in \mathbb{N}$, the $n$-th approximation of $A$ is the cardinality of the set $A_n = \{a \in A \mid \ell(a) \le n\}$.
- An ordered set (or class) of “numbers” (the possible numerosity values).
- A surjective map $\mathrm{num}$ that assigns to each set its numerosity value, obeying four fundamental principles:
1. Union Principle: if $\mathrm{num}(A)=\mathrm{num}(A')$ and $\mathrm{num}(B)=\mathrm{num}(B')$ and the domains of $A$ and $B$ (as well as those of $A'$ and $B'$) are disjoint, then $\mathrm{num}(A \cup B)=\mathrm{num}(A' \cup B')$.
2. Cartesian Product Principle: if $\mathrm{num}(A)=\mathrm{num}(A')$ and $\mathrm{num}(B)=\mathrm{num}(B')$, then $\mathrm{num}(A \times B)=\mathrm{num}(A' \times B')$.
3. Zermelo's Principle (ZP): $\mathrm{num}(A) < \mathrm{num}(B)$ if and only if there exists a proper subset $A' \subset B$ with $\mathrm{num}(A') = \mathrm{num}(A)$.
4. Asymptotic Principle (AP): if for all $n$ the $n$-th approximation of $A$ is less than or equal to that of $B$, then $\mathrm{num}(A) \le \mathrm{num}(B)$.

From these principles follow various properties, including the definition of “sum of numerosities” (as the disjoint union of sets) and “product of numerosities” (as the Cartesian product).

== Examples: countably infinite sets ==
A classic example is the set of positive natural numbers $\mathbb{N^+}$, which in this approach is associated with an “infinite number”,
often denoted by $\alpha$:

$$\mathrm{num}(\mathbb{N^+}) = \alpha$$;

If one considers the set of even numbers, in Cantor’s theory this set is equipotent to $\mathbb{N}$, but in the numerosity approach of Vieri Benci and his collaborators it has the value $\alpha/2$, so that it is “half” of the naturals (and thus preserving the principle that the set of even numbers is a proper subset of $\mathbb{N}$ and therefore must have a smaller numerosity).

Naturally, $\alpha/2$ is not a standard real number but an element of a non-Archimedean set that extends the naturals.

With similar considerations, we can obtain the numerosity of the following infinite sets

$$\mathrm{num}(\mathbb{Z}) = 2\alpha + 1$$
$$\mathrm{num}(\mathbb{Q^+}) = \alpha^2$$
$$\mathrm{num}(\mathbb{Q}) = 2\alpha^2 + 1$$

== Connection with nonstandard analysis ==
The ideas underlying numerosity also connect with Robinson’s Nonstandard Analysis: one obtains numerical systems that include infinities and infinitesimals “coherent” with the operations of addition and multiplication. The infinity $\alpha$ that expresses the numerosity of $\mathbb{N}$ can be treated as a non-standard element, larger than all finite numbers, thus allowing proofs and methods typical of non-Archimedean analysis.

== Applications and ongoing research ==
Research on numerosity has been applied or discussed in:

- Alternative classifications of set sizes in certain discrete or combinatorial contexts.
- Rigorous exploration of properties akin to measures, straddling the fields of measure theory and cardinal arithmetic.
- Investigations into the foundations of mathematics, particularly concerning the nature of infinity.
- Probability and the philosophy of science.

Although it is relatively niche, the theory continues to be studied and extended by a small group of mathematicians interested in foundational issues or in building a bridge between finite intuitions and infinite contexts.

== See also ==
- Cardinality
- Cardinal Number
- Natural density
- Nonstandard Analysis
- Hyperreal number
- Ordinal Number
- Cantor's Theorem
- Surreal number
