= Conformal radius =

In mathematics, the conformal radius is a way to measure the size of a simply connected planar domain D viewed from a point z in it. As opposed to notions using Euclidean distance (say, the radius of the largest inscribed disk with center z), this notion is well-suited to use in complex analysis, in particular in conformal maps and conformal geometry.

A closely related notion is the transfinite diameter or (logarithmic) capacity of a compact simply connected set D, which can be considered as the inverse of the conformal radius of the complement E = D^{c} viewed from infinity.

== Definition ==
Given a simply connected domain D ⊂ C, and a point z ∈ D, it then follows from the Riemann mapping theorem that there exists a unique conformal homeomorphism f : D → D onto the open unit disk (usually referred to as the uniformizing map) with f(z) = 0 ∈ D and f′(z) ∈ R_{+}. The conformal radius of D from z is then defined as

$$\operatorname{rad}(z,D) := \frac{1}{f'(z)}\,.$$

The simplest example is that the conformal radius of the disk of radius r viewed from its center is also r, shown by the uniformizing map x ↦ x/r. See below for more examples.

One reason for the usefulness of this notion is that it behaves well under conformal maps: if φ: D → D′ is a conformal bijection and z in D, then $\operatorname{rad}(\varphi(z),D') = |\varphi'(z)|\operatorname{rad}(z,D)$.

The conformal radius can also be expressed as $\exp(\xi_x(x))$ where $\xi_x(y)$ is the harmonic extension of $\log(|x-y|)$ from $\partial D$ to $D$.

== A special case: the upper-half plane ==
Let K ⊂ H be a subset of the upper half-plane such that D:= H\K is connected and simply connected, and let z ∈ D be a point. (This is a usual scenario, say, in the Schramm–Loewner evolution). By the Riemann mapping theorem, there is a conformal bijection g: D → H. Then, for any such map g, a simple computation gives that

$$\operatorname{rad}(z,D) = \frac{2\operatorname{Im}(g(z))}{|g'(z)|}\,.$$

For example, when K = ∅ and z = i, then g can be the identity map, and we get rad(i, H) = 2. Checking that this agrees with the original definition: the uniformizing map f : H → D is

$$f(z)=i\frac{z-i}{z+i},$$

and then the derivative can be easily calculated.

== Relation to inradius ==
That it is a good measure of radius is shown by the following immediate consequence of the Schwarz lemma and the Koebe 1/4 theorem: for z ∈ D ⊂ C,

$$\frac{\operatorname{rad}(z,D)}{4} \leq \operatorname{dist} (z,\partial D) \leq \operatorname{rad}(z,D),$$

where dist(z, ∂D) denotes the Euclidean distance between z and the boundary of D, or in other words, the radius of the largest inscribed disk with center z.

Both inequalities are best possible:

The upper bound is clearly attained by taking D = D and z = 0.

The lower bound is attained by the following “slit domain”: D = C\R_{+} and z = −r ∈ R_{−}. The square root map φ takes D onto the upper half-plane H, with $\varphi(-r) = i\sqrt{r}$ and derivative $|\varphi'(-r)|=\frac{1}{2\sqrt{r}}$. The above formula for the upper half-plane gives $\operatorname{rad}(i\sqrt{r},\mathbb{H})=2\sqrt{r}$, and then the formula for transformation under conformal maps gives rad(−r, D) = 4r, while, of course, dist(−r, ∂D) = r.

== Version from infinity: transfinite diameter and logarithmic capacity ==
When D ⊂ C is a connected, simply connected compact set, then its complement E = D^{c} is a connected, simply connected domain in the Riemann sphere that contains ∞, and one can define

$$\operatorname{rad}(\infty,D) := \frac{1}{\operatorname{rad}(\infty,E)} := \lim_{z\to\infty} \frac{f(z)}{z},$$

where f : C\D → E is the unique bijective conformal map with f(∞) = ∞ and that limit being positive real, i.e., the conformal map of the form

$$f(z)=c_1z+c_0 + c_{-1}z^{-1} + \cdots, \qquad c_1\in\mathbf{R}_+.$$

The coefficient c_{1} = rad(∞, D) equals the transfinite diameter and the (logarithmic) capacity of D; see Chapter 11 of Pommerenke (1975) and Kuz′mina (2002).

The coefficient c_{0} is called the conformal center of D. It can be shown to lie in the convex hull of D; moreover,

$$D\subseteq \{z: |z-c_0|\leq 2 c_1\}\,,$$

where the radius 2c_{1} is sharp for the straight line segment of length 4c_{1}. See pages 12–13 and Chapter 11 of Pommerenke (1975).

== The Fekete, Chebyshev and modified Chebyshev constants ==
We define three other quantities that are equal to the transfinite diameter even though they are defined from a very different point of view. Let

$$d(z_1,\ldots,z_k):=\prod_{1\le i<j\le k} |z_i-z_j|$$

denote the product of pairwise distances of the points $z_1,\ldots,z_k$ and let us define the following quantity for a compact set D ⊂ C:

$$d_n(D):=\sup_{z_1,\ldots,z_n\in D} d(z_1,\ldots,z_n)^{1\left/\binom n 2\right.}$$

In other words, $d_n(D)$ is the supremum of the geometric mean of pairwise distances of n points in D. Since D is compact, this supremum is actually attained by a set of points. Any such n-point set is called a Fekete set.

The limit $d(D):=\lim_{n\to\infty} d_n(D)$ exists and it is called the Fekete constant.

Now let $\mathcal P_n$ denote the set of all monic polynomials of degree n in C[x], let $\mathcal Q_n$ denote the set of polynomials in $\mathcal P_n$ with all zeros in D and let us define

$\mu_n(D):=\inf_{p\in\mathcal P_n} \sup_{z\in D} |p(z)|$ and $\tilde{\mu}_n(D):=\inf_{p\in\mathcal Q_n} \sup_{z\in D} |p(z)|$

Then the limits

$\mu(D):=\lim_{n\to\infty} \mu_n(D)^{1/n}$ and $\mu(D):=\lim_{n\to\infty} \tilde{\mu}_n(D)^{1/n}$

exist and they are called the Chebyshev constant and modified Chebyshev constant, respectively. Michael Fekete and Gábor Szegő proved that these constants are equal.

== Applications ==
The conformal radius is a very useful tool, e.g., when working with the Schramm–Loewner evolution. A beautiful instance can be found in Lawler, Schramm & Werner (2002).
