= Stephen Semmes =

American mathematician

Stephen William Semmes (born 26 May 1962) is the Noah Harding Professor of Mathematics at Rice University. He is known for contributions to analysis on metric spaces, as well as harmonic analysis, complex variables, partial differential equations, and differential geometry. He received his B.S. at the age of 18, a Ph.D. at 21 from Washington University in St. Louis and became a full professor at Rice at 25.

== Awards ==
Semmes was awarded a Sloan Fellowship in 1987. In 1994, he gave an invited talk at the International Congress of Mathematicians.

== Publications ==
- Coifman, R.; Lions, P.-L.; Meyer, Y.; Semmes, S.: Compensated compactness and Hardy spaces. J. Math. Pures Appl. (9) 72 (1993), no. 3, 247–286.
- David, Guy; Semmes, Stephen: Analysis of and on uniformly rectifiable sets. Mathematical Surveys and Monographs, 38. American Mathematical Society, Providence, RI, 1993.
- David, G.; Journé, J.-L.; Semmes, S.: Opérateurs de Calderón-Zygmund, fonctions para-accrétives et interpolation. [Calderón-Zygmund operators, para-accretive functions and interpolation] Rev. Mat. Iberoamericana 1 (1985), no. 4, 1–56.
- David, Guy; Semmes, Stephen: Fractured fractals and broken dreams. Self-similar geometry through metric and measure. Oxford Lecture Series in Mathematics and its Applications, 7. The Clarendon Press, Oxford University Press, New York, 1997.
- MR1414889 (97j:46033) Semmes, S. Finding curves on general spaces through quantitative topology, with applications to Sobolev and Poincaré inequalities. Selecta Math. (N.S.) 2 (1996), no. 2, 155–295.
- Stephen Semmes. "Appendix B: Metric spaces and mappings seen at many scales" (pp. 401–518). In Gromov, Misha: Metric Structures for Riemannian and Non-Riemannian Spaces. Based on the 1981 French original. With appendices by M. Katz, P. Pansu and S. Semmes. Translated from the French by Sean Michael Bates. Progress in Mathematics, 152. Birkhäuser Boston, Inc., Boston, MA, 1999. xx+585 pp. ISBN 0-8176-3898-9
