= Mostow–Palais theorem =

Equivariant version of the Whitney embedding theorem

In mathematics, the Mostow–Palais theorem is an equivariant version of the Whitney embedding theorem. It states that if a manifold is acted on by a compact Lie group with finitely many orbit types, then it can be embedded into some finite-dimensional orthogonal representation. It was introduced by Mostow (1957) and Palais (1957).
