= Anatoli Vitushkin =

Russian mathematician (1931–2004)

Anatoli Georgievich Vitushkin
- Born: June 25, 1931; Moscow, Soviet Union
- Died: May 9, 2004 (aged 72); Moscow, Russia
- Education: Moscow State University
- Known for: Contributions to mathematical analysis
- Awards: Kolmogorov Prize (2003)
- Scientific career
- Fields: Mathematician
- Workplaces: Steklov Institute
- Doctoral advisor: Andrey Kolmogorov
- Doctoral students: Victor Pan

Anatoli Georgievich Vitushkin (Russian: Анато́лий Гео́ргиевич Виту́шкин) (June 25, 1931 – May 9, 2004) was a Soviet mathematician noted for his work on analytic capacity and other parts of mathematical analysis.

== Early life ==
Anatoli Georgievich Vitushkin was born on 25 June 1931 in Moscow. He was blind.

== Career ==
He entered Moscow State University in 1949 after graduating from the Tula Suvorov Military School where mathematics was taught as part of a broader education for potential officers. He graduated in 1954. He studied under Andrey Kolmogorov and benefited from participation in Alexander Kronrod's circle.

He joined the Steklov Institute of Mathematics staff in 1965.

For many years he was a member of the editorial board of the Russian journal; Mathematical Notes.

He died, at the age of 72, in Moscow on 9 May 2004.

== Bibliography ==
- Vitushkin, Anatoli G. (2004). "On Hilbert's thirteenth problem and related questions". Russian Mathematical Surveys. 51 (1): 11–25. Bibcode:2004RuMaS..59...11V. doi:10.1070/RM2004v059n01ABEH000698. S2CID 250837749.
- Vitushkin, A. G.; Chirka, E.M.; Khenkin, G.M.; Dolbeault, P. (November 1, 1997). Introduction to Complex Analysis. Springer-Verlag. ISBN 978-3-540-63005-0.
- Vitushkin, A. G. (1988). "Uniform approximation of functions by holomorphic functions". Proc. Steklov Inst. Math. (Mathematical Physics and Complex Analysis) (3): 301–308.
- Vitushkin, A. G. (1983). "Global normalization of a real-analytic surface along a chain". Soviet Math. Dokl. (27): 270–273.
- Vitushkin, A. G. (1983). "Holomorphic extension of mappings of compact hypersurfaces". Math. USSR Izvestiya. 20 (1): 27–33. Bibcode:1983IzMat..20...27V. doi:10.1070/IM1983v020n01ABEH001337.
- Vitushkin, Anatoli G. (May 1, 1976). "Uniform approximations by holomorphic functions" [Uniform approximations by holomorphic functions]. Journal of Mathematical Sciences (in Russian). 5 (5). New York: Springer: 607–611. doi:10.1007/BF01091907.
- Vitushkin, A. G. (1974). Coding of signals with finite spectrum and sound recording problems. Proc. International Congress of Mathematicians. Vol. 1. Vancouver. pp. 221–226.
- Vitushkin, A. G.; Henkin, G.M. (1967). "Linear superpositions of functions". Uspekhi Mat. Nauk. 22 (1(133)): 77–124. Bibcode:1967RuMaS..22...77V. doi:10.1070/RM1967v022n01ABEH001204. S2CID 250845714.
- Vitushkin, A. G. (1954). "On Hilbert's thirteenth problem". Dokl. Akad. Nauk SSSR (in Russian). 96: 701.
- Vitushkin, A. G. (1954). "[On certain estimates of variations of sets]". Dokl. Akad. Nauk SSSR (in Russian). 95: 433.
