= Ferran Sunyer i Balaguer =

Spanish mathematician (1912–1967)

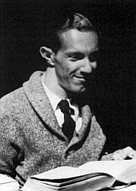
- Born: 6 February 1912
- Died: 27 December 1967 (aged 55)
- Occupation: Mathematician
- Known for: Mathematics

Ferran Sunyer i Balaguer (6 February 1912 – 27 December 1967) was a Catalan mathematician who is the namesake of the Ferran Sunyer i Balaguer Prize. He was born with almost complete physical disabilities and never went to school because his doctor advised that Ferran should not be subjected to such stress. He was homeschooled by his mother and developed great interests in mathematics.

It wasn't until 9 December 1967, 18 days prior to his death, that his confirmation as a scientific member was made public by the Divisió de Ciencias Matemá, Médicas y de Naturaleza of the Council.
