= Arlette =

Arlette (pronounced [aʁlɛt]) is a French feminine given name. Notable people with the name include:

- Arlette or Herleva (c. 1005 – c. 1050), the mother of William the Conqueror
- Arlette Alcock (born 1958), Métis-Canadian folk musician
- Arlette Amuli (born 1995), American content creator, social media personality, and producer
- Arlette Ben Hamo (born 1930), French track and field athlete
- Arlette Broil (1922–1989), known as Bessie Griffin, American gospel singer
- Marie-Arlette Carlotti (born 1952), French politician and Member of the European Parliament for the south-east of France
- Arlette Chabot (born 1951), French journalist and political commentator
- Arlette Contreras (born 1990), Peruvian lawyer and activist
- Arlette Conzemius (born 1956), Luxembourgish ambassador
- Arlette Cousture (born 1948), Canadian writer
- Arlette Dagnon Vignikin (born 1951), ambassador of Benin
- Arlette Dorgère (1880–1965), French actress, dancer and singer
- Arlette Elkaïm-Sartre (1935–2016), French translator and editor
- Arlette Faidiga (1938–2023), Italian swimmer
- Arlette Farge (born 1941), French historian of the 18th century
- Arlette Fortin (1949–2009), Canadian writer
- Arlette Franco (1939–2010), member of the National Assembly of France
- Arlette Gondrée (born c. 1940), French café owner
- Arlette Grosso (born 1937), French alpine skier
- Arlette Grosskost (born 1953), member of the National Assembly of France
- Arlette Halff (1908–2007), French tennis player
- Arlette Holsters (born 1961), Belgian equestrian
- Arlette Jouanna (1936–2022), French historian and academic
- Arlette Laguiller (born 1940), French politician
- Arlette Langmann (born 1946), French screenwriter, film editor and production designer
- Arlette Lefebvre (born 1947), Canadian child psychiatrist at the Hospital for Sick Children in Toronto
- Arlette Leroi-Gourhan (1913–2005), French archaeologist
- Arlette Lucero, American visual artist, educator and illustrator
- Arlette Mafuta (born 1989), Congolese footballer
- Arlette Marchal (1902–1984), French film actress
- Arlette Merry (1918–2015), French actress and singer
- Arlette Renee Morlan (1958–2016), American author
- Arlette Ivette Muñoz Cervantes (born 1983), Mexican politician
- Arlette Nougarède (born 1930), French cell biologist
- Arlette Poirier (1926–2012), French actress
- Arlette Racineux (born 1961), French wheelchair tennis player
- Arlette Ramaroson (born 1944), Malagasy judge
- Perri Arlette Reid (born 1964), known as Pebbles, American musician, producer and pastor
- Arlette Roxburgh, Trinidadian-American singer and songwriter
- Arlette Rujel (born 1999), Peruvian model, etiquette teacher and image consultant
- Chrystelle-Arlette Sahuc (born 1975), French rhythmic gymnast
- Arlette Schneiders, Luxembourgish architect
- Arlette Sombo-Dibélé (born 1958), Central African lawyer and politician
- Arlette Soudan-Nonault, Congolese journalist and politician, Minister of Tourism and Environment
- Arlette Sterckx (born 1964), Belgian television actress
- Arlette Thomas (1927–2015), French actress
- Alette Varda (1928–2019), known as Agnès Varda, French filmmaker
- Arlette Vassy (1913-2000), French geophysicist, 1961 identified a hole in the ozone layer
- Arlette Wilmes (born 1950), Luxembourgish swimmer
- Arlette Zakarian, French and Austrian lawyer
- Arlette Zola (born 1949), singer who represented Switzerland in the Eurovision Song Contest 1982
- Arletty (1898–1992), formerly Arlette, French actress, singer and fashion model

== See also ==
- Arlette (musical), 1917 operetta with songs by Ivor Novello
- Arlette (1997 film), a 1997 French film
- Arlette (2022 film), a 2022 Canadian film
- Arlette, a French cinnamon-flavoured palmier biscuit
- Arlette Truffaut or Murmur, a Marvel character
- Arlette Van der Valk, a fictional character by Nicolas Freeling
- 164586 Arlette, a minor planet
- Naughty Arlette, 1949 British film
- Tropical Disturbance Arlette (1964)
