= Annie Raoult =

French applied mathematician

Annie Raoult (born 14 December 1951) is a French applied mathematician specializing in the mathematical modeling of cell membranes, graphene sheets, and other thin nanostructures. She is vice president of the Centre International de Mathématiques Pures et Appliquées and professor emerita at Paris Descartes University, where she directed the laboratory for applied mathematics.

== Education and career ==
Raoult was a student from 1971 to 1974 at the École normale supérieure de Fontenay-aux-Roses, and a maître de conférences at Pierre and Marie Curie University from 1975 to 1992, earning a third-cycle doctorate there in 1980 and a state doctorate in 1988. She became a professor at Joseph Fourier University in Grenoble in 1992, and remained there until 2005, also serving as deputy director of the computer science and applied mathematics laboratories UFR and UJF from 1996 to 2001. In 2005 she came to Paris Descartes University as a professor, and from 2009 to 2014 she directed the laboratory for applied mathematics (MAP5) at Paris Descartes University. In 2017 she became vice president of the Centre International de Mathématiques Pures et Appliquées (CIMPA), and later the same year retired from Paris Descartes University to become a professor emerita.

== Recognition ==
In 2000, Raoult won the Prix Paul Doistau–Émile Blutet of the French Academy of Sciences in the area of mechanical and computational sciences.
