= Ramis =

Ramis may refer to:

== Surname ==
- Harold Ramis (1944–2014), American actor, director and screenwriter
- Iván Ramis (born 1984), Spanish footballer
- Jean-Pierre Ramis (born 1943), French mathematician
- Juan Ramis (1746–1819), Spanish historian
- Jonathan Ramis (born 1989), Uruguayan footballer
- Llucia Ramis (born 1977), Spanish writer and journalist
- Luis Miguel Ramis (born 1970), Spanish footballer
- Magali García Ramis (born 1946), Puerto Rican writer
- Victorio Ramis (born 1994), Argentine footballer

== Other ==
- Ramis, Armenia, ancient settlement in Goghtn Region of Armenia
- RAMIS (software) fourth-generation programming language
