= Arlette (disambiguation) =

Arlette is a French feminine given name.

Arlette may also refer to:

- Arlette (1997 film), a French comedy-romance film
- Arlette (2022 film), a Canadian political satire comedy-drama film
- Arlette (musical), a 1917 operetta
