= Guazzelli =

Guazzelli is a surname. Notable people with this name include:

- Élisabeth Guazzelli (born 1955), French physicist
- Eloar Guazzelli (1922–1994), Brazilian politician
- François Guazzelli (1954–2009), French gangster
- Giuliano Guazzelli (1934–1992), Italian carabinieri marshal, killed by mafia
- Sinval Guazzelli (1930–2001), Brazilian politician, governor of Rio Grande do Sul and minister of agriculture
- Victor Guazzelli (1920–2004), British Catholic bishop
