= Lian-Ping Wang =

Mechanical engineer and academic

- Born: 1965 (age 60–61); Linhai, Zhejiang, China
- Occupations: Mechanical engineer and academic

Academic background
- Education: BS., Applied Mathematics and Engineering Mechanics; PhD., Mechanical Engineering
- Alma mater: Zhejiang University; Washington State University
- Thesis: On the dispersion of heavy particles by turbulent motion (1990)
- Doctoral advisor: David E. Stock

Lian-Ping Wang is a mechanical engineer and academic, most known for his work on computational fluid dynamics, turbulence, particle-laden flow, and immiscible multiphase flow, and their applications to industrial and atmospheric processes. He is the chair professor of mechanics and aerospace engineering at the Southern University of Science and Technology in China, professor of mechanical engineering, and joint professor of physical ocean science and engineering at University of Delaware.

Wang's research primarily focuses on fundamental physics in turbulent multiphase flows, utilizing computational fluid dynamics (CFD) modeling for intricate flows across various systems, including industrial, natural, and biological contexts. He developed traditional Navier-Stokes-based CFD methods and mesoscopic Boltzmann-equation based methods, like the lattice Boltzmann method and discrete unified gas kinetic scheme, as direct numerical simulation tools for complex turbulent and multiphase flows. He also devised numerical methods for studying complex fluid flow and transport in fuel cells and soil porous media, as well as the transport and retention of colloids and nanoparticles in the subsurface environment.

Wang is an elected Fellow of the American Society of Mechanical Engineers and the American Physical Society. He was named in the World's Top 2% Scientists list by Stanford University in 2023 and in the Most Cited Chinese Researchers list by Elsevier in 2021 and 2022. In addition, he is an associate editor of the Journal of Fluid Mechanics and Theoretical and Applied Mechanics Letters, as well as a member of the Editorial Advisory Board for the International Journal of Multiphase Flow.

== Education ==
Wang received a bachelor's degree in mechanics in 1984 from Zhejiang University, before going to the US for PhD study, and subsequently obtained a PhD in mechanical engineering from Washington State University in 1990. During his PhD, he developed a theoretical model predicting the turbulent dispersion of sedimenting inertial particles, concurrently developing an empirical correlation for the integral time scale of fluid velocity observed by such particles, which came to be known as the Wang and Stock correction in multiphase flow literature.

== Career and research ==
During his postdoctoral tenure with Martin Maxey, they authored a paper on particle-laden turbulent flows, utilizing DNS to reveal novel effects of small-scale turbulence structure on particle behavior. At Penn State, he conducted a study on Kolmogorov refined similarity using high-resolution DNS flows, measuring various quantities related to the intermittency and scaling dynamics of fine-scale turbulence.

In 1994, Wang joined the University of Delaware as an assistant professor of mechanical engineering, later becoming an associate professor in 2001 and professor in 2009. He serves as a chair professor of mechanics and aerospace engineering and director of the Center for Computational Science and Engineering at the Southern University of Science and Technology in China, professor of mechanical engineering, and joint professor of physical ocean science and engineering at the University of Delaware.

During the period of 1998 to 2013, Wang's research concentrated on the turbulent collision rate and collision efficiency of inertial particles, where he played a role in establishing a theoretical foundation for the collision kernel, generating rigorous collision rate data from DNS, providing an analytical parameterization of the turbulent collision kernel, and studying the impact of turbulent collision on warm rain initiation. In 2012, he investigated the transport and retention of colloids and nanoparticles in porous media, considering the effects of physicochemical interaction forces. Using the lattice Boltzmann method and Lagrangian particle tracking, he explored multiscale reversible particle retention near grain surfaces, with factors like flow speed, ionic strength, and surface characteristics influencing the retention rate.

In recent years, Wang developed a lattice Boltzmann-based particle-resolving simulation tool to study turbulence modulation by finite-size solid particles, revealing size-dependent characteristics. His group improved lattice Boltzmann method implementation for moving boundaries, enhancing numerical stability and computational efficiency, including the first DNS of turbulent pipe flow using the lattice Boltzmann method. He also developed lattice-Boltzmann models fully consistent with Navier-Stokes equations, such as the use of 2D rectangular or 3D cuboid lattices, and introduced a new D3Q27 lattice Boltzmann model enabling mesoscopic computation of local fluid vorticity, derived through an inverse design approach using hydrodynamic equations. Wang further applied the particle-resolving simulation tool to study the enhancement of particle drag in a turbulent background flow and dynamics of non-spherical particles.

== Awards and honors ==
- 1998 – Francis Alison Young Scholars Award, University of Delaware
- 2006 – Distinguished Overseas Young Investigator Award, National Natural Science Foundation of China
- 2011 – Fellow, American Physical Society
- 2016 – Fellow, American Society of Mechanical Engineers
- 2016-2017 – Invitation Fellow, Japan Society for the Promotion of Science
- 2021, 2022 – Most Cited Chinese Researchers, Elsevier
- 2022 – Best Mechanical and Aerospace Engineering Scientists in China by Research.com

== Selected articles ==
- Wang, L. P., & Maxey, M. R. (1993). Settling velocity and concentration distribution of heavy particles in homogeneous isotropic turbulence. Journal of fluid mechanics, 256, 27–68.
- Wang, L. P., & Stock, D. E. (1993). Dispersion of heavy particles by turbulent motion. Journal of Atmospheric Sciences, 50(13), 1897–1913.
- Wang, L. P., Wexler, A. S., & Zhou, Y. (2000). Statistical mechanical description and modelling of turbulent collision of inertial particles. Journal of Fluid Mechanics, 415, 117–153.
- Devenish, B. J., Bartello, P., Brenguier, J. L., Collins, L. R., Grabowski, W. W., IJzermans, R. H. A., ... & Warhaft, Z. (2012). Droplet growth in warm turbulent clouds. Quarterly Journal of the Royal Meteorological Society, 138(667), 1401–1429.
- Grabowski, W. W., & Wang, L. P. (2013). Growth of cloud droplets in a turbulent environment. Annual review of fluid mechanics, 45, 293–324.
- Peng, C., Ayala, O.M., & Wang, L. P. (2019). A direct numerical investigation of two-way interactions in a particle-laden turbulent channel flow, Journal of fluid mechanics, 875, 1096–1144.
- Zhang, C., Guo, Z., & Wang, L. P. (2023). A thermodynamically consistent diffuse interface model for multi-component two-phase flow with partial miscibility. Computers & Mathematics with Applications, 150, 22–36.
