= Prix Paul Doistau–Émile Blutet =

French Academy of Sciences award in mathematics, physics, and biology

The Prix Paul Doistau–Émile Blutet is a biennial prize awarded by the French Academy of Sciences in the fields of mathematics and physical sciences since 1954. Each recipient receives 3000 euros. The prize is also awarded quadrennially in biology. The award is also occasionally awarded in other disciplines.

== List of laureates ==
=== Mathematics ===
- 1958 Marc Krasner
- 1980 Jean-Michel Bony
- 1982 Jean-Pierre Ramis
- 1982 Gérard Maugin
- 1985 Dominique Foata
- 1986 Pierre-Louis Lions
- 1987 Pierre Bérard
- 1987 Lucien Szpiro
- 1999 Wendelin Werner
- 2001 Hélène Esnault
- 2004 Laurent Stolovitch
- 2006 Alice Guionnet
- 2008 Isabelle Gallagher
- 2010 Yves André
- 2012 Serge Cantat
- 2014 Sébastien Boucksom
- 2016 Hajer Bahouri
- 2018 Colin Guillarmou

=== Physical sciences ===
- 2002 Jérôme Bouvier
- 2005 Mustapha Besbes
- 2007 Jean-Pascal Cogné
- 2009 Hasnaa Chennaoui-Aoudjehane
- 2011 Henri-Claude Nataf
- 2013 Jean-François Cardoso
- 2015 Philippe André
- 2019 Bruno Sicardy

=== Integrative biology ===
- 2000 Jérôme Giraudat
- 2004 Marie-Claire Verdus
- 2008 Hélène Barbier-Brygoo
- 2012 Olivier Hamant

=== Mechanical and computational science ===
- 2000 Annie Raoult
- 2002 Gilles Francfort
- 2002 Jean-Jacques Marigo
- 2006 Hubert Maigre
- 2006 Andreï Constantinescu
- 2008 Pierre Comte
- 2010 Nicolas Triantafyllidis
- 2012 Élisabeth Guazzelli
- 2014 Jacques Magnaudet
- 2019 Denis Sipp

=== Other disciplines ===
- 1967 Jacques Blamont
- 1975 Bernard Fauconnier
- 1976 Martial Ducloy
- 1976 Arlette Nougarède
- 1981 Christian Bordé
- 1988 Jean-Loup Chenot
- 2021 Martha Cecilia Bustamante
