= Élisabeth Guazzelli =

French physicist (born 1955)

- Born: January 17, 1955
- Education: École normale supérieure de Fontenay-aux-Roses; Paris-Sud University; University of Provence
- Known for: Mobile particulate systems Sedimenting suspensions
- Awards: Member of the Istituto Veneto di Scienze, Lettere ed Arti; Fellow of the American Physical Society (2008); Fluid Mechanics Fellow of the European Mechanics Society (EUROMECH) (2010); Knight of the Legion of Honour (2012); Prix Paul Doistau–Émile Blutet of the French Academy of Sciences (2012); EUROMECH Fluid Mechanics Prize (2016); Member of the National Academy of Engineering (2021)
- Scientific career
- Fields: Fluid mechanics
- Doctoral advisor: Étienne Guyon; R. Blanc

Élisabeth Guazzelli (born 17 January 1955) is a French experimental physicist whose research concerns fluid mechanics, suspensions of particles in liquids, and particle-laden flows. She is a director of research for the French National Centre for Scientific Research (CNRS), affiliated with the Laboratoire Matière et Systèmes Complexes at the University of Paris. Currently, Guazzelli serves as the editor of the Journal of Fluid Mechanics Rapid edited by Cambridge University Press.

== Education and career ==
Guazzelli was a student from 1974 to 1979 at the École normale supérieure de Fontenay-aux-Roses, while earning bachelor's and master's degrees in physics through Paris-Sud University in 1974 and 1979 respectively. She earned a doctorate of the third cycle in 1981 at Paris-Sud University under the supervision of Étienne Guyon, and a state doctorate in 1986 at the University of Provence under the supervision of R. Blanc.

She joined CNRS in 1982, became a director of research in 1996, and in 2015 was promoted to exceptional-class director of research. She was deputy director of the Institut Universitaire des Systèmes Thermiques Industriels (IUSTI) at Aix-Marseille University from 2008 to 2011, and since 2012 has been rector of the International Centre for Mechanical Sciences (CISM), a non-profit scientific organization based in Udine, Italy.

== Book ==
Guazzelli is the coauthor with Jeffrey F. Morris of the book A Physical Introduction to Suspension Dynamics (Cambridge University Press, 2012).

== Recognition ==
Guazzelli is a member of the Istituto Veneto di Scienze, Lettere ed Arti. In 2008 she was elected a Fellow of the American Physical Society (APS), after a nomination from the APS Division of Fluid Dynamics, "for extensive and careful experiments revealing complex phenomena in mobile particulate systems". In 2010 the European Mechanics Society (EUROMECH) named her as a Fluid Mechanics Fellow, with the same commendation. In 2021, Guazzelli was elected a Member of the National Academy of Engineering, "for experiments and theory that enhance understanding of dispersed particulate systems".

She was named a knight of the Legion of Honour in 2012, and in the same year won the Prix Paul Doistau–Émile Blutet of the French Academy of Sciences in the area of mechanical and computational sciences. She was the 2016 winner of the EUROMECH Fluid Mechanics Prize, "in recognition of her ground-breaking experiments on sedimenting suspensions, demonstrating the origin of particle fluctuations and cluster formation, for her decisive guidance of theory through focused experiments, and for her important contributions to the European mechanics community". She was awarded with the Fluid Dynamics Prize of the American Physical Society in 2023. She received the 2024 Gay-Lussac-Humboldt Research Prize.
