= Bony–Brezis theorem =

Theorem in topology

In mathematics, the Bony–Brezis theorem, due to the French mathematicians Jean-Michel Bony and Haïm Brezis, gives necessary and sufficient conditions for a closed subset of a manifold to be invariant under the flow defined by a vector field, namely at each point of the closed set the vector field must have non-positive inner product with any exterior normal vector to the set. A vector is an exterior normal at a point of the closed set if there is a real-valued continuously differentiable function maximized locally at the point with that vector as its derivative at the point. If the closed subset is a smooth submanifold with boundary, the condition states that the vector field should not point outside the subset at boundary points. The generalization to non-smooth subsets is important in the theory of partial differential equations.

The theorem had in fact been previously discovered by Mitio Nagumo in 1942 and is also known as the Nagumo theorem.

== Statement ==
Let F be closed subset of a C^{2} manifold M and let X be a vector field on M which is Lipschitz continuous. The following conditions are equivalent:

- Every integral curve of X starting in F remains in F.
- (X(m),v) ≤ 0 for every exterior normal vector v at a point m in F.

== Proof ==
Following Hörmander (1983), to prove that the first condition implies the second, let c(t) be an integral curve with c(0) = x in F and dc/dt= X(c). Let g have a local maximum on F at x. Then g(c(t)) ≤ g (c(0)) for t small and positive. Differentiating, this implies that g '(x)⋅X(x) ≤ 0.

To prove the reverse implication, since the result is local, it is enough to check it in R^{n}. In that case X locally satisfies a Lipschitz condition

$$\displaystyle{|X(a)-X(b)|\le C|a-b|.}$$

If F is closed, the distance function D(x) = d(x,F)^{2} has the following differentiability property:

$$\displaystyle{D(x+h)=D(x) + \min_{z} 2h\cdot(x-z)  + o(|h|),}$$

where the minimum is taken over the closest points z to x in F.

To check this, let

$$\displaystyle{f_\varepsilon(h)=\min_{z} 2h\cdot(x- z),}$$

where the minimum is taken over z in F such that d(x,z) ≤ d(x,F) + ε.

Since f_{ε} is homogeneous in h and increases uniformly to f_{0} on any sphere,

$$\displaystyle{f_0(h) \ge f_\varepsilon(h) \ge f_0(h) - C(\varepsilon) |h|,}$$

with a constant C(ε) tending to 0 as ε tends to 0.

This differentiability property follows from this because

$$\displaystyle{D(x+h) \le |x+h-z|^2 \le |z-x|^2 +2h\cdot (x-z) + |h|^2 =D(x) +f_0(h) +|h|^2}$$

and similarly if |h| ≤ ε

$$\displaystyle{D(x+h) \ge D(x) + f_\varepsilon(h) + |h|^2.}$$

The differentiability property implies that

$$\displaystyle{\lim{\delta\downarrow 0} {D(c(t+\delta)) - D(c(t))\over \delta} =2\min_z X(c(t))\cdot (c(t)-z),}$$

minimized over closest points z to c(t). For any such z

$$\displaystyle{2X(c(t))\cdot (c(t)-z)= 2 X(z)\cdot (c(t)-z) - 2(X(z)-X(c(t)))\cdot (c(t)-z).}$$

Since −|y − c(t)|^{2} has a local maximum on F at y = z, c(t) − z is an exterior normal vector at z. So the first term on the right hand side is non-negative. The Lipschitz condition for X implies the second term is bounded above by 2C⋅D(c(t)). Thus the derivative from the right of

$$\displaystyle{e^{-2Ct}D(c(t))}$$

is non-positive, so it is a non-increasing function of t. Thus if c(0) lies in F, D(c(0))=0 and hence D(c(t)) = 0 for t > 0, i.e. c(t) lies in F for t > 0.

== Literature ==
- Nagumo, Mitio (1942), "Über die lage der integralkurven gewöhnlicher differentialgleichungen", Nippon Sugaku-Buturigakkwai Kizi Dai 3 Ki, 24: 551–559 (in German)
- Yorke, James A. (1967), "Invariance for ordinary differential equations", Mathematical Systems Theory, 1 (4): 353–372, doi:10.1007/BF01695169, S2CID 5973578
- Bony, Jean-Michel (1969), "Principe du Maximum, inégalité de Harnack et unicité du problème de Cauchy pour les opérateurs elliptiques dégénerés" (PDF), Annales de l'Institut Fourier, 19: 277–304, doi:10.5802/aif.319 (in French)
- Brezis, Haim (1970), "On a characterization of flow-invariant sets", Comm. Pure Appl. Math., 223 (2): 261–263, doi:10.1002/cpa.3160230211
- Redheffer, R. M. (1972), "The Theorems of Bony and Brezis on Flow-Invariant Sets", The American Mathematical Monthly, 79 (7): 740–747, doi:10.2307/2316263, JSTOR 2316263
- Crandall, Michael G. (1972), "A generalization of Peano's existence theorem and flow invariance", Proceedings of the American Mathematical Society, 36 (1): 151–155, doi:10.1090/S0002-9939-1972-0306586-2
- Volkmann, Peter (1974), "Über die positive Invarianz einer abgeschlossenen Teilmenge eines Banachschen Raumes bezüglich der Differentialgleichung u'= f (t, u)", Journal für die reine und angewandte Mathematik, 1976 (285): 59–65, doi:10.1515/crll.1976.285.59, S2CID 117740430 (in German)
- Hörmander, Lars (1983), Analysis of Partial Differential Operators I, Springer-Verlag, pp. 300–305, ISBN 3-540-12104-8, Theorem 8.5.11
- Blanchini, Franco (1999), "Survey paper: Set invariance in control", Automatica, 35 (11): 1747–1767, doi:10.1016/S0005-1098(99)00113-2
- Walter, Wolfgang (1998). Ordinary Differential Equations. Springer. ISBN 978-0387984599.

== See also ==
- Barrier certificate
