= Jean-Yves Chemin =

French mathematician (born 1959)

Jean-Yves Chemin (French pronunciation: [ʒɑ̃ iv ʃəmɛ̃]; born 23 April 1959 in Rouen) is a French mathematician, specializing in nonlinear partial differential equations.

== Education and career ==
Chemin studied from 1979 at the École normale supérieure de Cachan (now named the École normale supérieure Paris-Saclay) with licentiate in 1980 and agrégation in 1982. At Paris-Sud University (Paris XI) he graduated in 1983 with Diplôme d'études approfondies (DEA) and in 1986 with doctorate in mathematics. His doctoral dissertation Analyse microlocale précisée de solutions d’équations aux dérivées partielles non linéaires was supervised by Jean-Michel Bony. Chemin became in 1986 Attaché de recherche at the École Polytechnique and in 1988 Chargé de recherche at the CNRS. In 1989 he received his habilitation with a thesis on singularities of nonlinear hyperbolic partial differential equations. From 1991 to 1995 he was Maître de conférences at the École Polytechnique. At Pierre and Marie Curie University (Paris VI) in the Jacques-Louis Lions Laboratory, he was from 1993 to 2001 a professor and is since 2004 a professor. From 2001 to 2004 he was Professeur à temp plein (full-time non-tenured professor) at the École Polytechnique.

His research deals with nonlinear partial differential equations describing physical systems that evolve over time. He focuses particularly on the Navier-Stokes equations and also works on the semi-linear Schrödinger equation and analysis on the Heisenberg group.

In 2012 he was awarded the Grand Prix Servant of the French Academy of Sciences for his work on the Navier-Stokes equations.

From 1995 to 2001 he was a member of the Institut Universitaire de France. In 1995 he was awarded the Prix Langevin of the Académie des Sciences.

Chemin was an invited speaker in 1994 at the International Congress of Mathematicians (ICM) in Zürich and an invited speaker with Hajer Bahouri in 2002 at the ICM in Beijing.

Chemin's doctoral students include Isabelle Gallagher.

== Books ==
- Perfect Incompressible Fluids. Clarendon Press. 1998. ISBN 978-0-19-850397-2. (French original, Asterisque, tome 230, Societé Mathématiques de France, 1995)
- with Benoit Desjardins, Isabelle Gallagher, and Emmanuel Grenier: Mathematical Geophysics: An Introduction to Rotating Fluids and the Navier-Stokes Equations. Clarendon Press. 13 April 2006. ISBN 978-0-19-857133-9.
- with Hajer Bahouri and Raphaël Danchin: Bahouri, Hajer; Chemin, Jean-Yves; Danchin, Raphaël (2011). Fourier Analysis and Nonlinear Partial Differential Equations. Grundlehren der mathematischen Wissenschaften. Vol. 343. Berlin, Heidelberg: Springer. ISBN 978-3-642-16830-7. OCLC 704397128.
