= Arlette Dorgère =

French actress, dancer and singer

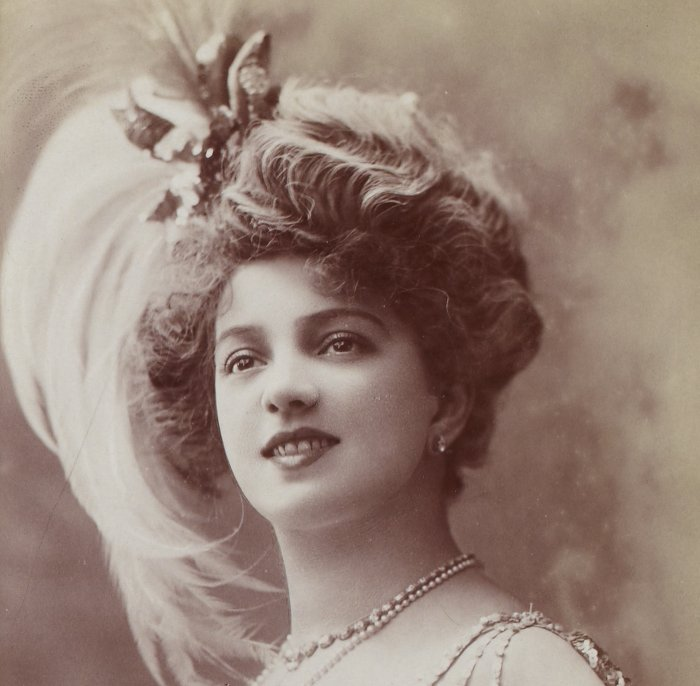
- Born: Anna Mathilde Irma Jouve; 8 June 1880; Paris, French Third Republic
- Died: 1965 (aged 84–85); Monaco
- Spouse: Louis Margerie (m.1958)

Arlette Dorgère (born Anna Mathilde Irma Jouve, 8 June 1880 – 1965) was a French actress, dancer, model, and singer, known internationally as a stage beauty before World War I.

== Early life ==
Anna Mathilde Irma Jouve was born in 1880, in the 8th arrondissement of Paris. Her father was a waiter.

== Career ==
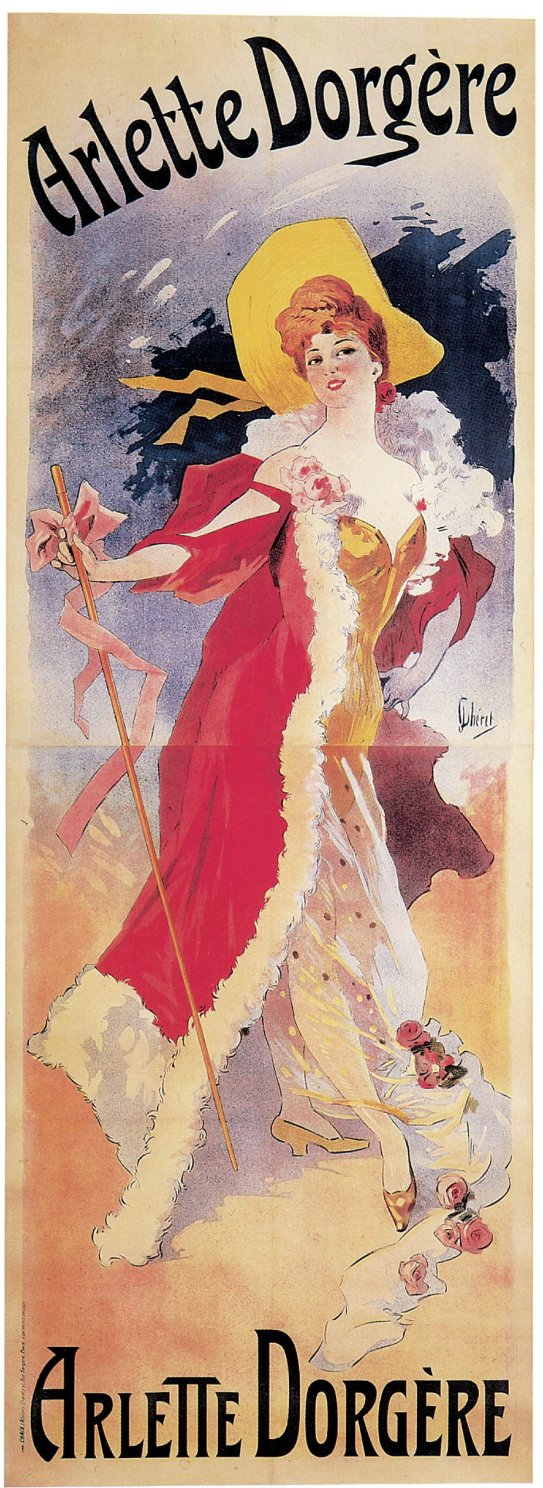
Arlette Dorgère poster by Jules Chéret, circa 1904

Dorgère began her stage career as a child, and she appeared in dozens of plays during her career. Her international celebrity was also focused on her beauty and off-stage activities. In 1907, she received $30,000 in damages when her legs were broken and her face was scratched in a traffic accident. She was billed as "the Parisian queen of Vaudeville" for her first London appearance in 1908. In 1909, her corseted waist was said to measure less than 20 inches. She made headlines again in 1911, when her reticule and jewelry were stolen in a Paris shop.

Dorgère was featured on a large number of postcards of the Belle Époque. She was a popular model for posters and in French magazines. Her clothing and hats were covered on fashion pages in newspapers. She was known for her love of perfumes; "It really is a sort of mania with me. I use perfume as perhaps no other woman of modern times uses it," she wrote in 1913. "Even my dog's fur is filled with sachet powder. My cats, my parrot and my horse all have their coats perfumed."

In 1914, she was among the Paris actresses who volunteered to care for French troops wounded in World War I. She was in an Paris parade celebrating the Armistice in 1918.

== Personal life ==
Dorgére was linked romantically with Grand Duke Boris Vladimirovich of Russia in 1910. Between 1904 and 1929, she owned the Vigneux-sur-Seine chateau, also called the "château Dorgère". She died in Monaco in 1965.

== Theatre appearances ==
Year	Title	Personnel	Theatre
1907	L'Ingénu libertin ou La Marquise et le marmiton	Louis Artus	Théâtre des Bouffes-Parisiens
1909	Les Deux Visages	Fernand Nozière	Théâtre Michel
1911	L'Amour en manœuvres d'André Mouëzy-Éon	André Mouëzy-Éon	Théâtre du Palais-Royal
1911	La Revue des X	Gaston Arman de Caillavet, Romain Coolus, Francis de Croisset, Albert Guinon, Max Maurey and Jacques Richepin	Théâtre des Bouffes-Parisiens
1912	La Part du feu d'André Mouëzy-Éon	Marcel Nancey	Théâtre des Bouffes-Parisiens
1913	Les Honneurs de la guerre	Maurice Hennequin	Théâtre du Vaudeville
