= Hajer Bahouri =

French-Tunisian mathematician

- Born: March 30, 1958; Tunis, Tunisia
- Education: University of Tunis; University Paris‑Sud
- Known for: Microlocal analysis; nonlinear wave equations; Fourier analysis
- Awards: Paul Doistau-Émile Blutet Prize (2016)
- Scientific career
- Fields: Partial differential equations
- Workplaces: École Polytechnique; University of Paris‑Sud; University of Rennes I; University of Tunis; CNRS / University Paris‑Est‑Créteil (LAMA)
- Doctoral advisor: Serge Alinhac

Hajer Bahouri (born 30 March 1958, in Tunis) is a Tunisian mathematician who is interested in partial differential equations. She is Director of Research at the National Center for Scientific Research and the Laboratory of Analysis and Applied Mathematics at the University Paris-Est-Créteil-Val-de-Marne.

== Career ==
From 1977, Bahouri studied mathematics at the University of Tunis, graduating in 1979; she then received the President's Award. She studied in Paris and obtained a Master of Advanced Studies in 1980 at the University Paris-Sud and a doctorate in 1982, under the direction of Serge Alinhac, with a thesis entitled Uniqueness and non-uniqueness of the Cauchy problem for real symbol operators. Then she devoted herself to research at École Polytechnique; from 1984 to 1988, she was a lecturer at the University of Paris-Sud and Rennes-I. In 1987, she obtained her doctoral degree (thesis) at the University of Paris-Sud (Uniqueness, non-uniqueness and Hölder continuity of the Cauchy problem for partial differential equations. Propagation of the wavefront Cρ for nonlinear equations).

Starting in 1988 she was a professor at the Tunis University, where she directed, from 2003, the laboratory of partial differential equations. From 2002 to 2004, she was also a lecturer at École Polytechnique. Since 2010, she has been Research Director of the National Center for Scientific Research at the University Paris-Est-Créteil-Val-de-Marne (Laboratory of Analysis and Applied Mathematics).

== Awards ==
In 2002, she was a guest speaker at the International Congress of Mathematicians in Beijing, with Jean-Yves Chemin (Quasilinear wave equations and microlocal analysis). In 2001, she received the Tunisian Medal of Merit and, in 2016, she won the Paul Doistau-Émile Blutet Prize.

== Selected publications ==
- " High Frequency Approximation of Solutions to Critical Nonlinear Wave Equations", 1997
- Bahouri, Hajer; Chemin, Jean-Yves; Danchin, Raphaël (2011). Fourier Analysis and Nonlinear Partial Differential Equations. Grundlehren der mathematischen Wissenschaften. Vol. 343. Berlin, Heidelberg: Springer. ISBN 978-3-642-16830-7. OCLC 704397128.
- "Phase-space Analysis and Pseudodifferential Calculus on the Heisenberg Group", 2012
