= Mitio Nagumo =

Japanese mathematician

- Born: 7 May 1905; Yamagata Prefecture, Japan
- Died: 6 February 1995 (aged 89); Koganei, Tokyo, Japan
- Education: University of Tokyo
- Known for: Nagumo theorem Nagumo’s uniqueness theorem Kolmogorov-Nagumo-de Finetti mean
- Scientific career
- Fields: Mathematics
- Workplaces: University of Osaka
- Doctoral advisor: Takuji Yosie
- Notable students: Jin Akiyama

Mitio (Michio) Nagumo (Japanese: 南雲 道夫; May 7, 1905 – February 6, 1995) was a Japanese mathematician, who specialized in the theory of differential equations. He gave the first necessary and sufficient condition for positive invariance of closed sets under the flow induced by ordinary differential equations (Nagumo/Bony-Brezis theorem).

== Biography ==
Mitio Nagumo graduated from the Department of Mathematics at the Imperial University of Tokyo in March 1928. In March 1931 he was appointed Lecturer in the Faculty of Technology at the Imperial University of Kyushu. In February 1932 he left Japan for an academic visit to Göttingen, where he remained for two years. Upon his return from Göttingen in March 1934, he was appointed Lecturer in the Department of Mathematics at the Imperial University of Osaka, and was promoted to Associate Professor in September that year, becoming Professor in the Faculty of Science in March 1936. In March 1937 Nagumo received a Doctor of Science degree from the Imperial University of Tokyo. In the 1960s he made a number of academic visits abroad, spending time at the Courant Institute of Mathematical Sciences (where he visited Kurt Friedrichs and other old acquaintances from his time at Göttingen) and the Federal University of Rio Grande do Sul in 1960, followed by a visit to the National Tsing Hua University in 1963-64. He retired from Osaka University in December 1966, after which he was granted the title of Honorary Professor. He was subsequently appointed Professor at Sophia University, from which he retired in March 1976, having reached mandatory retirement age.

Much of Nagumo's original work was published in Japanese and German, however his research and teaching have influenced numerous mathematicians (especially in Japan) who have since made many of his results available in English.

== Works ==
- Nagumo, Mitio (1937), "Über die Differentialgleichung y"= ƒ (x, y, y')", Nippon Sugaku-Buturigakkwai Kizi Dai 3 Ki, 19: 861–866 (in German)
- Nagumo, Mitio (1942), "Über die Lage der Integralkurven gewöhnlicher Differentialgleichungen", Nippon Sugaku-Buturigakkwai Kizi Dai 3 Ki, 24: 551–559 (in German)
- Nagumo, Mitio (1941), "Über das Anfangswertproblem Partieller Differentialgleichungen", Japanese Journal of Mathematics: Transactions and Abstracts, 8 (10), Mathematical Society of Japan (in German)
- Nagumo, Mitio (1977), "Quantities and real numbers", Osaka J. Math, 14: 1–10
- Nagumo, Mitio; Fukuhara, Masuo (1930), "On a condition of stability for a differential equation", Proceedings of the Imperial Academy, 6 (4): 131–132, doi:10.3792/pia/1195581383
- Nagumo, Mitio (1944), "On the periodic solution of an ordinary differential equation of second order", Zenkoku Shijou Suugaku Danwakai: 54–61
- Nagumo, Mitio (1961). Introduction to the theory of Banach space. Vol. 1. Editôra Meridional-"Emma".

== Literature ==
- Yamaguti, Masaya; Nirenberg, Louis; Mizohata, Sigeru; Sibuya, Yasutaka (1993). Mitio Nagumo Collected Papers. Springer Japan. ISBN 978-4431549338.
- Hsieh, Po-Fang; Sibuya, Yasutaka (June 1999). Basic Theory of Ordinary Differential Equations. Springer. ISBN 9781461215066.
