= Paraproduct =

In mathematics, a paraproduct is a non-commutative bilinear operator acting on functions that in some sense is like the product of the two functions it acts on. According to Svante Janson and Jaak Peetre, in an article from 1988, "the name 'paraproduct' denotes an idea rather than a unique definition; several versions exist and can be used for the same purposes." The concept emerged in J.-M. Bony’s theory of paradifferential operators.

This said, for a given operator $\Lambda$ to be defined as a paraproduct, it is normally required to satisfy the following properties:

- It should "reconstruct the product" in the sense that for any pair of functions $(f, g)$ in its domain,

$$fg = \Lambda(f, g) + \Lambda(g, f).$$

- For any appropriate functions $f$ and $h$ with $h(0)=0$, it is the case that $h(f) = \Lambda(f, h'(f))$.
- It should satisfy some form of the Leibniz rule.

A paraproduct may also be required to satisfy some form of Hölder's inequality.

== Further references ==
- Árpád Bényi, Diego Maldonado, and Virginia Naibo, "What is a Paraproduct?", Notices of the American Mathematical Society, Vol. 57, No. 7 (Aug., 2010), pp. 858–860.
