= Jacques Blamont =

French astrophysicist (1926–2020)

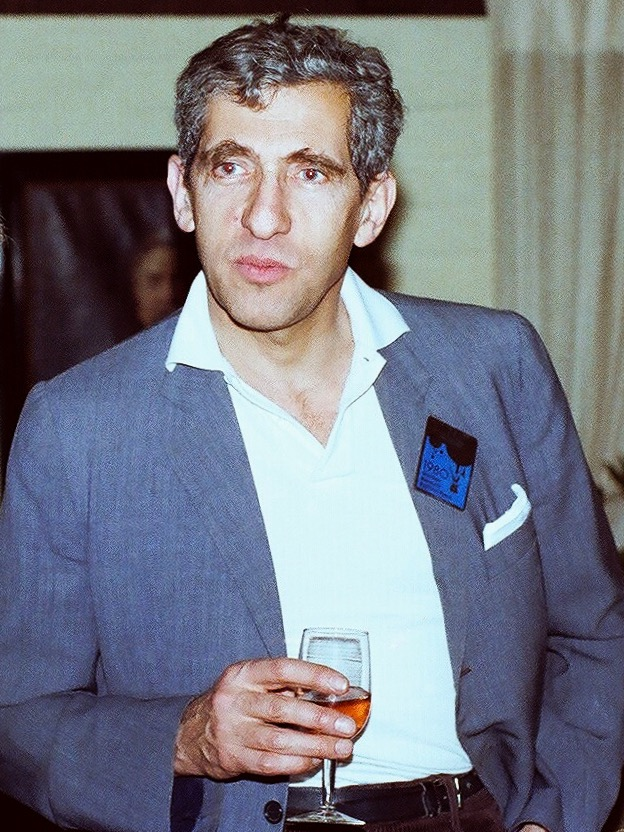
- Jacques Blamont in Rolling Hills, CA 1980
- Born: Jacques Émile Blamont; 13 October 1926; Paris, France
- Died: 13 April 2020 (aged 93); Châtillon, France
- Occupation: Astrophysicist
- Known for: Aerospace programmes
- Awards: Padma Shri; Commander of the Legion of Honour; Grand Officer of the National Order of Merit; Commander of the Academic Palms; Grand Cross of the National Order of Merit; Rovel H. Prize; Aimé Cotton Prize; Leon Grelaud Prize; CNES Vermeil Medal; Prix Paul Doistau–Émile Blutet; President's Silver Medal; Daniel and Florence Guggenheim Award; NASA Exceptional Scientific Achievement Medal; USSR Academy of Sciences Gagarin Medal; IAA Guggenheim Medal; Soviet Order of Friendship of Peoples; IAA Theodore von Karman Medal; ISRO Vikram Sarabhai Medal; Guiana Space Center Gold Medal; Spie prize French Roberval Prize; ISOE George N. Goddard Award; NASA Distinguished Service Medal; COSPAR Space Science Award

Jacques Émile Blamont (French pronunciation: [ʒak bla.mɔ̃]; 13 October 1926 – 13 April 2020) was a French astrophysicist, author and the founder scientific and technical director of National Centre for Space Studies (CNES-Centre national d'études spatiales), known to have contributed to the development of Veronique, the first rocket launched by France in 1957. He was an elected fellow of the French Academy of Technologies and a professor emeritus of the Pierre and Marie Curie University (University of Paris VI).

Blamont was a recipient of several national honours such as Commander of the Legion of Honour, the third highest French civilian honour, Grand Officer of the National Order of Merit, the second highest French civilian honour, Commander of the Academic Palms, Grand Cross of the National Order of Merit, the highest French civilian honour, President's Silver Medal, Soviet Order of Friendship of Peoples and Padma Shri, the fourth highest Indian civilian award.

== Biography ==
Jacques Blamont was born in Paris in France on 13 October 1926 and did his studies at the École Normale Supérieure where he came in contact with the Nobel laureate, Alfred Kastler, who was serving the institution as a professorial chair. He graduated from École Normale Supérieure in 1948 and continued his studies at the National Centre for Scientific Research (CNRS) as an associate of physical sciences. In 1952, he reunited with Alfred Kastler in research on atomic coherence phenomenon and secured his doctoral degree (Doctor of Science) under his guidance in 1956.

Blamont continued at CNRS for a year more as a research fellow and joined the Aeronomy Service of the institution in 1957 where he became the deputy director in 1958. In 1961, he was promoted as the director, a post he held till 1985. He worked in many capacities during his stay with CNES, as a Scientific and Technical Director (1962–1972), as Top Scientific Advisor (1972–1982) and as an advisor to the President of CNES from 1982. During this period, he served the Pierre and Marie Curie University as a professor without chair from 1957 to 1961, as a full professor from 1962 to 1996 and as a professor emeritus from there on. He also worked as a research director at École Militaire (Joint Defence College).

He was made the first Vikram Sarabhai professor at the Physical Research Laboratory in 1977, a visiting professor at the California Institute of Technology in 1985 and a distinguished visiting scientist at Jet Propulsion Laboratory during 1980–2001. He was a member of International Academy of Astronautics (1969), Indian National Science Academy (1978), National Academy of Sciences, USA (1980), Air and Space Academy (1983), Academia Europaea (1989), Academy of Technology (2000), French Academy of Sciences and the American Philosophical Society(2002). He was also a member of the advisory council of the Planetary Society.

Blamont died on 13 April 2020 in Châtillon, Hauts-de-Seine, aged 93.

== Legacy ==
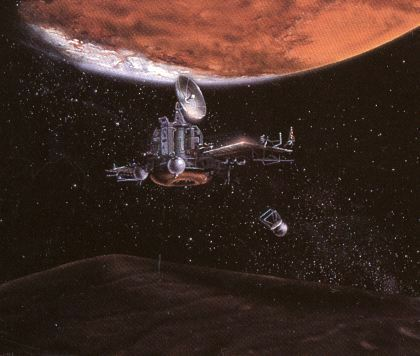
Phobos

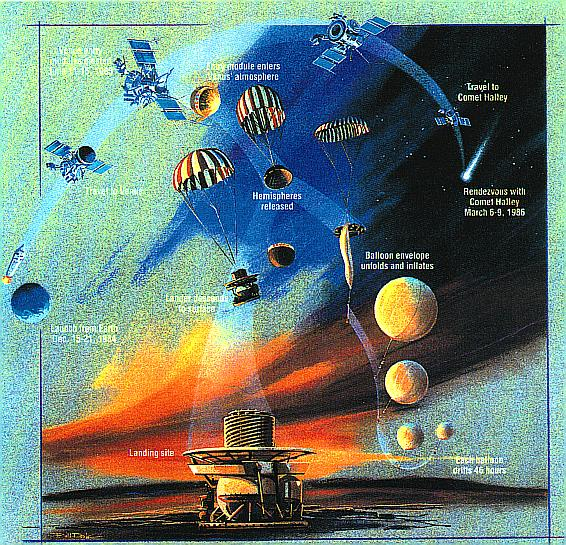
Vega mission

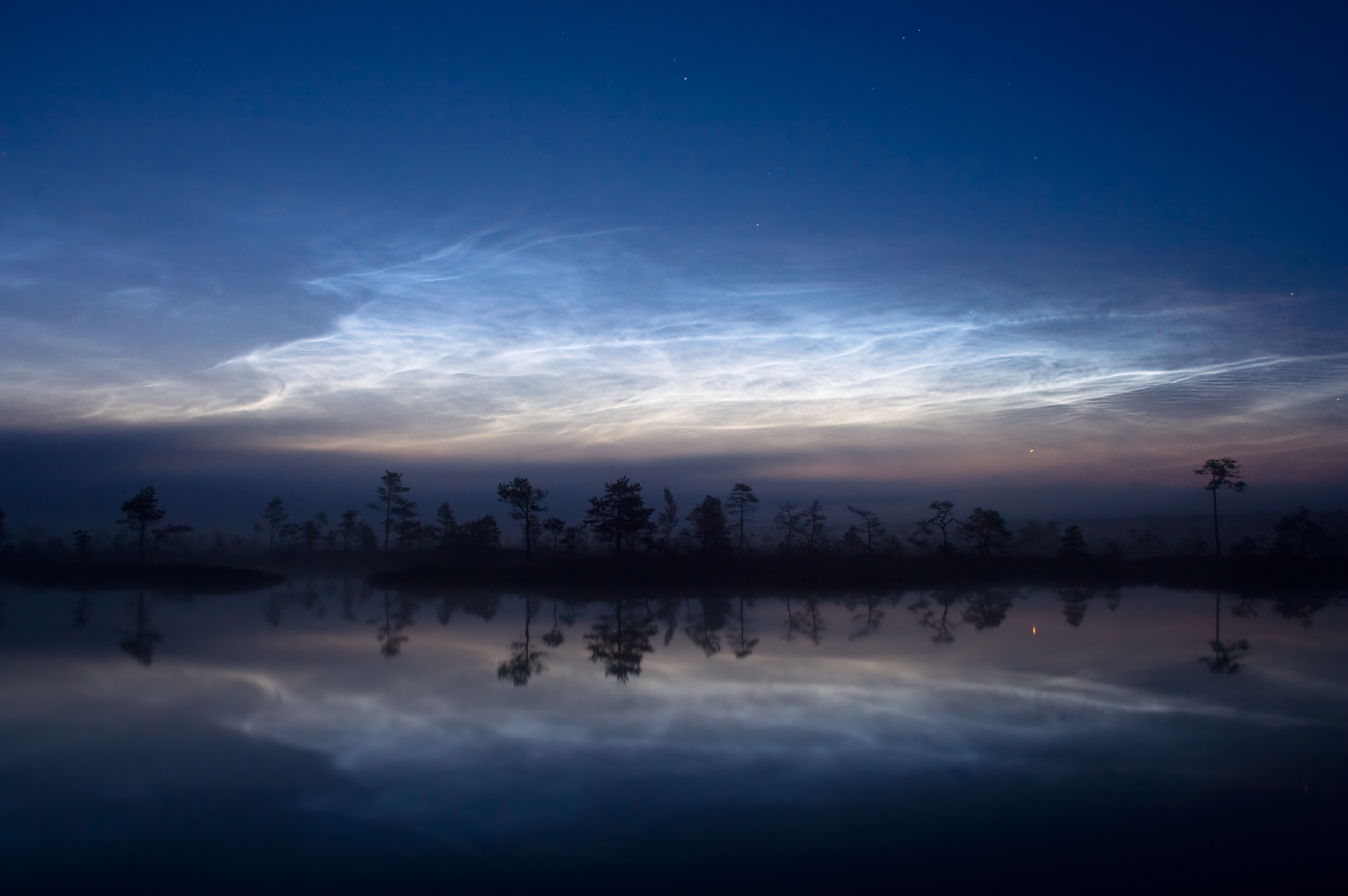
Noctilucent clouds

Blamont was one of the pioneers of French space programme and his efforts were reported in the establishment of CNES, the French Space Agency, in 1962. He was known to have contributed to the launch of the first French rocket, Véronique, in 1957. He was one of the founders of Service d’aéronomie du CNRS, (Aeronomy Service of Centre national de la recherche scientifique) and was its director from 1958 to 1985. He participated, as a member of the steering groups, in several global space missions such as the Voyager and Pioneer-Venus of NASA and Vega mission of the Soviet Union to Venus and Halley's Comet and acted as the chief investigator of the Phobos program of the USSR. He assisted Vikram Sarabhai in the establishment of the Indian National Committee for Space Research (INCOSPAR) which later grew to become the present day Indian Space Research Organization (ISRO) and played a part in providing the payload for the first two Indian rocket launches in 1963 and 1964.

Blamont was credited with the discovery of turbopause in 1959, the interstellar wind in 1970, the hydrogen envelope of comets in 1971 and the polar noctilucent clouds in 1973. He was known to have made the measurement of the temperature of the neutral atmosphere from 100 to 500 km, the dynamic parameters of the mesopause region, and Einstein's general relativity redshift on the Sun for the first time. He was the head of the group which introduced scientific ballooning and Lidar technology for atmospheric probing in Europe. The image compression device developed by Blamont is in use with various space agencies for planetary missions around the Moon, Mars and Titan. He also contributed to the establishment of a launch range, in Kourou, French Guiana.

Blamont, besides writing several articles on science, authored four books, viz. Vénus dévoilée, Voyage autour d'une planète (Venus Unveiled – 1987), Le Chiffre et le Songe, Histoire politique de la découverte (The Digit and the – 1993), Le Lion et le Moucheron, Histoire des Marranes de Toulouse (The Lion and the Midge – 2000) and Introduction au Siècle des Menaces (Introduction to the Age of Menaces – 2004). He also mentored 80 research scholars in their doctoral research.

== Awards and recognition ==
Blamont received three of the highest French civilian honours, Commander of the Legion of Honour, Grand Officer of the National Order of Merit and Grand Cross of the National Order of Merit apart from the honour of the Commander of the Order of Academic Palms and the Silver Medal from the President of the French Republic in 1967. He received the Soviet Order of Friendship of Peoples from the erstwhile Soviet Union in 1989 and the Government of India awarded him the fourth highest Indian civilian award of Padma Shri in 2015. He was a winner of NASA awards twice, NASA Exceptional Scientific Achievement Medal in 1972 and NASA Distinguished Service Medal in 2000 and the French Academy of Sciences honoured him two times, Leon Grelaud Prize in 1960 and Prix Paul Doistau–Émile Blutet in 1967. The Academy of Sciences of the USSR and the Indian Space Research Organization awarded him the Yuri Gagarin Medal in 1985 and the Vikram Sarabhai Medal in 1994 respectively. He won three awards from the International Academy of Astronautics, Daniel and Florence Guggenheim Award in 1967, Guggenheim Medal in 1986 and Von Karman Award in 1989. He was also a recipient of Rovel H. Prize from the Faculty of Paris in 1957, Aimé Cotton prize of the French Physical Society in 1960, CNES Vermeil medal in 1967, Spie prize, French Roberval Prize in 1993, Gold Medal of the Guiana Space Center in 1995, George N. Goddard Award from the International Society for Optical Engineering in 1997, Committee on Space Research (COSPAR) Space Science Award in 2004 and Prix International d'Astronautique (International Astronautics Prize), formerly known as Prix REP-Hirsch in 2019.

== Award gallery ==
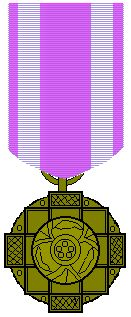
Padma Shri India

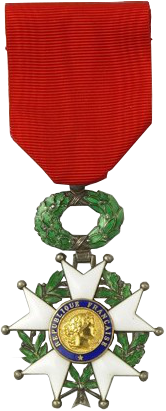
Commander of the Legion of Honour

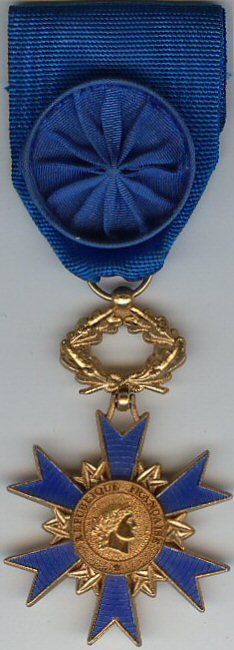
Grand Officer of the National Order of Merit

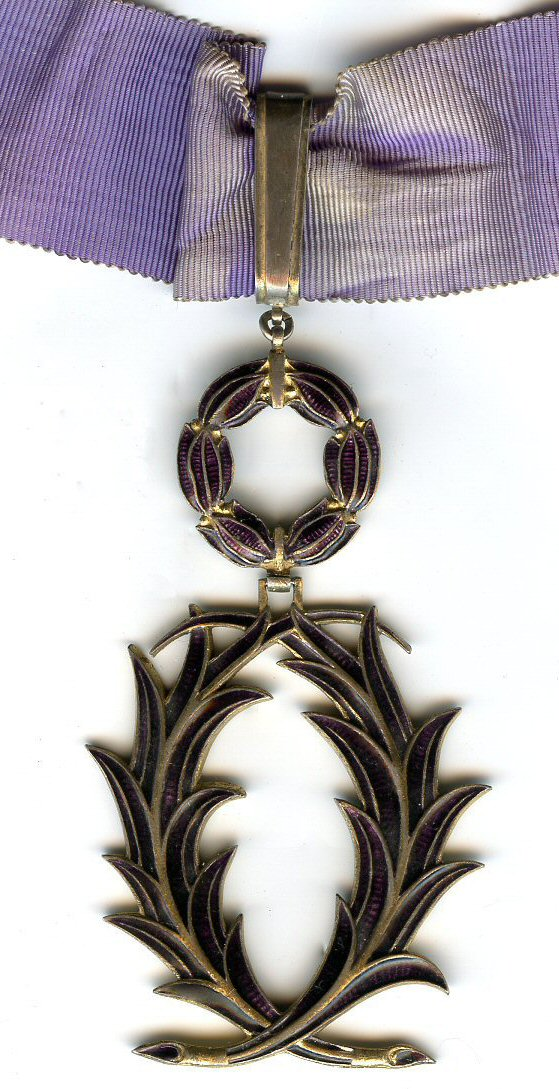
Commander of the Academic Palms

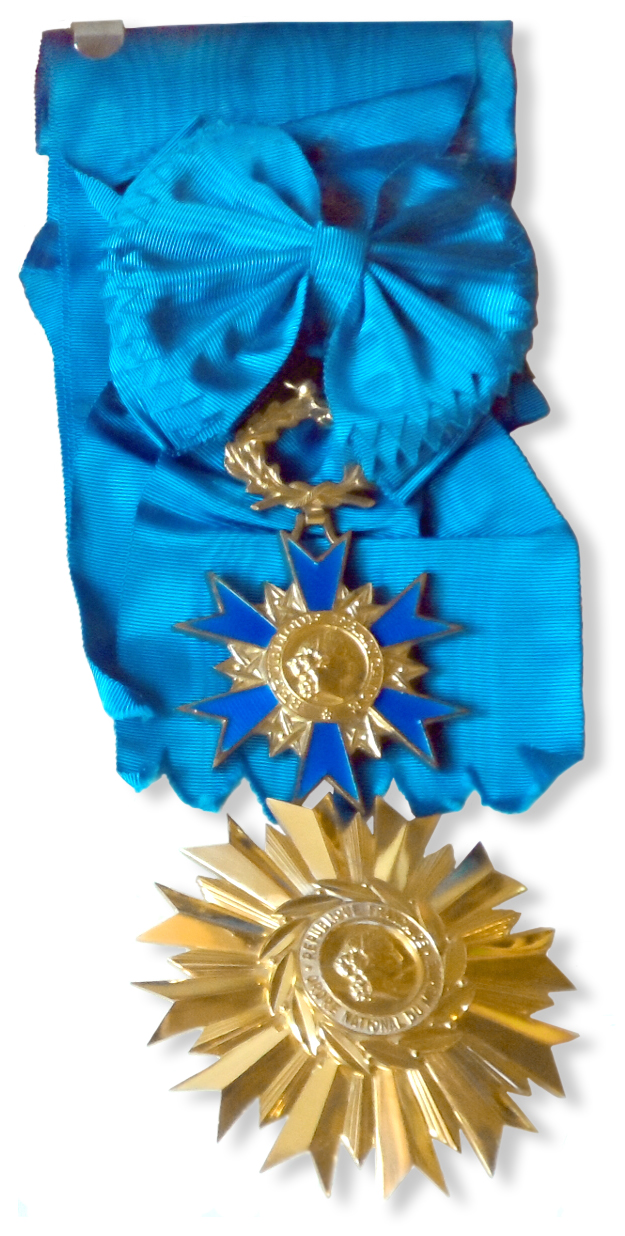
Grand Cross of the National Order of Merit

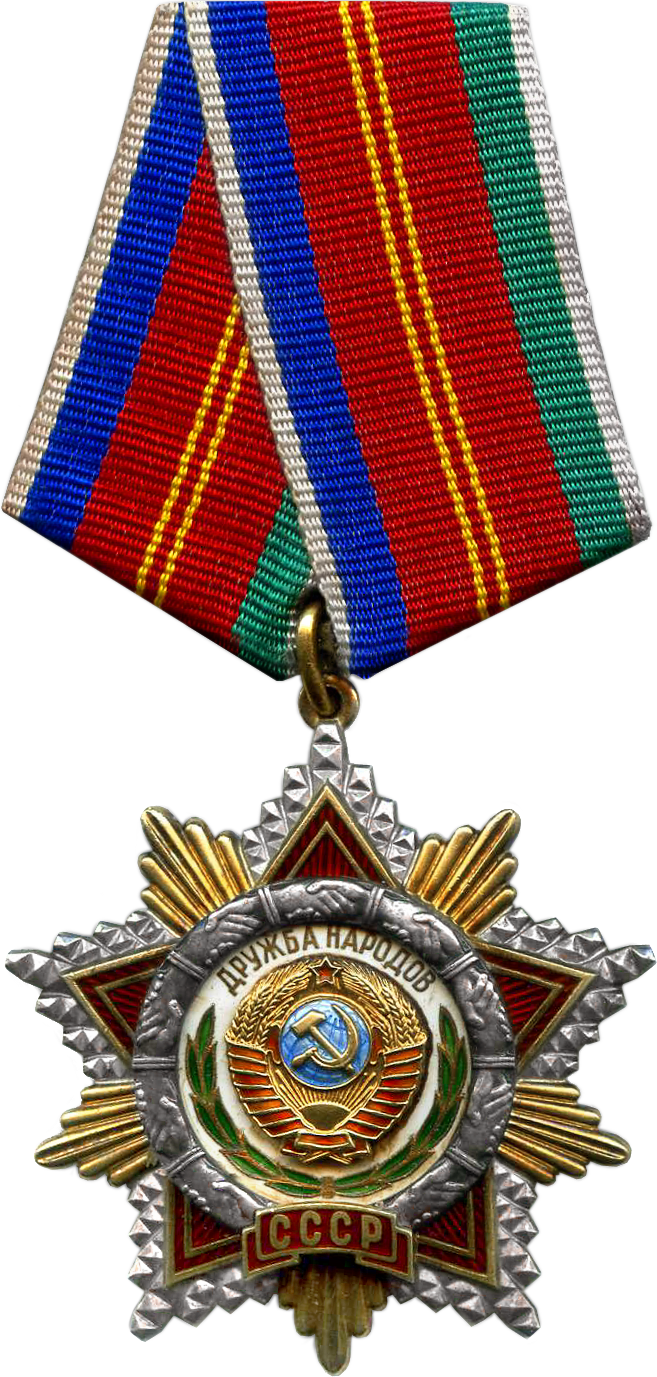
Soviet Order of Friendship of Peoples
