= Jean-Michel Bony =

French mathematician (born 1942)

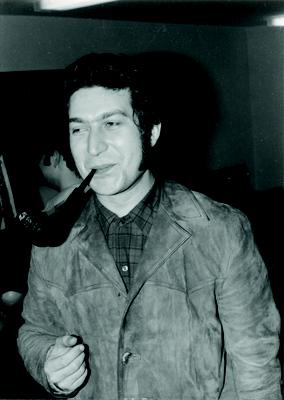
- Jean-Michel Bony
- Born: 1 February 1942; Paris, France
- Education: École Normale Supérieure (Paris)
- Known for: Bony's paraproduct Bony–Brezis theorem
- Awards: Prix Paul Doistau–Émile Blutet (1980); Peccot Lectures (1972/1973); ICM Speaker (1970, 1983)
- Scientific career
- Fields: Mathematics
- Workplaces: École polytechnique University of Paris
- Doctoral students: Jean-Yves Chemin

Jean-Michel Bony (French pronunciation: [ʒɑ̃ miʃɛl bɔni]; born 1 February 1942 in Paris) is a French mathematician, specializing in mathematical analysis. He is known for his work on microlocal analysis and pseudodifferential operators.

== Education and career ==
Bony completed his undergraduate and graduate studies at the École Normale Supérieure, where he received his Ph.D. in 1972 with thesis advisor Gustave Choquet. Bony became a professor at the University of Paris-Sud and is now a professor at the École Polytechnique.

His doctoral students include Jean-Yves Chemin.

== Research ==
Bony's research deals with microlocal analysis, partial differential equations and potential theory. In 1981 he published important results on paradifferential operators, extending the theory of pseudifferential operators published by Ronald Coifman and Yves Meyer in 1979. Bony applied his theory to the propagation of singularities in solutions of semilinear wave equations.

== Recognition ==
In 1980, Bony received the Prix Paul Doistau–Émile Blutet. He was elected a corresponding member and a full member of the French Academy of Sciences in 1990 and 2000 respectively.

He was an Invited Speaker at the ICM in 1970 in Nice and in 1983 in Warsaw.

== Selected publications ==
=== Articles ===
- with Philippe Courrège and Pierre Priouret: "Semi-groupes de Feller sur une variété à bord compacte et problèmes aux limites intégro-différentiels du second ordre donnant lieu au principe du maximum." In Annales de l'Institut Fourier, vol. 18, no. 2, pp. 369–521. Institut Fourier, 1968.
- "Principe du maximum, inégalité de Harnack et unicité du probleme de Cauchy pour les opérateurs elliptiques dégénérés." In Annales de l'Institut Fourier, vol. 19, no. 1, pp. 277–304. 1969.
- with Pierre Schapira: "Propagation des singularités analytiques pour les solutions des équations aux dérivées partielles." In Annales de l'Institut Fourier, vol. 26, no. 1, pp. 81–140. 1976.
- "Interaction des singularités pour les équations aux dérivées partielles non linéaires." Séminaire Équations aux dérivées partielles (Polytechnique) (1979): 1–11.
- with Nicolas Lerner: "Quantification asymptotique et microlocalisations d'ordre supérieur. I." In Annales Scientifiques de l'École Normale Supérieure, vol. 22, no. 3, pp. 377–433. 1989.
- with Jean-Yves Chemin: "Espaces fonctionnels associés au calcul de Weyl-Hörmander." Bulletin de la société Mathématique de France 122, no. 1 (1994): 77–118.

=== Books ===
- Cours d'analyse - Théorie des distributions et analyse de Fourier, Éditions de l'École Polytechnique 1992
- Méthodes mathématiques pour les sciences physiques, Èditions de l'École Polytechnique 2000

== Sources ==
- Gilles Lebeau (ed.): Autour de l’analyse microlocale: volume en l’honneur de Jean-Michel Bony, SMF, AMS 2003

== See also ==
- Bony–Brezis theorem
