= Arlette Dagnon Vignikin =

Ambassador of Benin

Arlette Claudine Kpèdétin Dagnon Vignikin
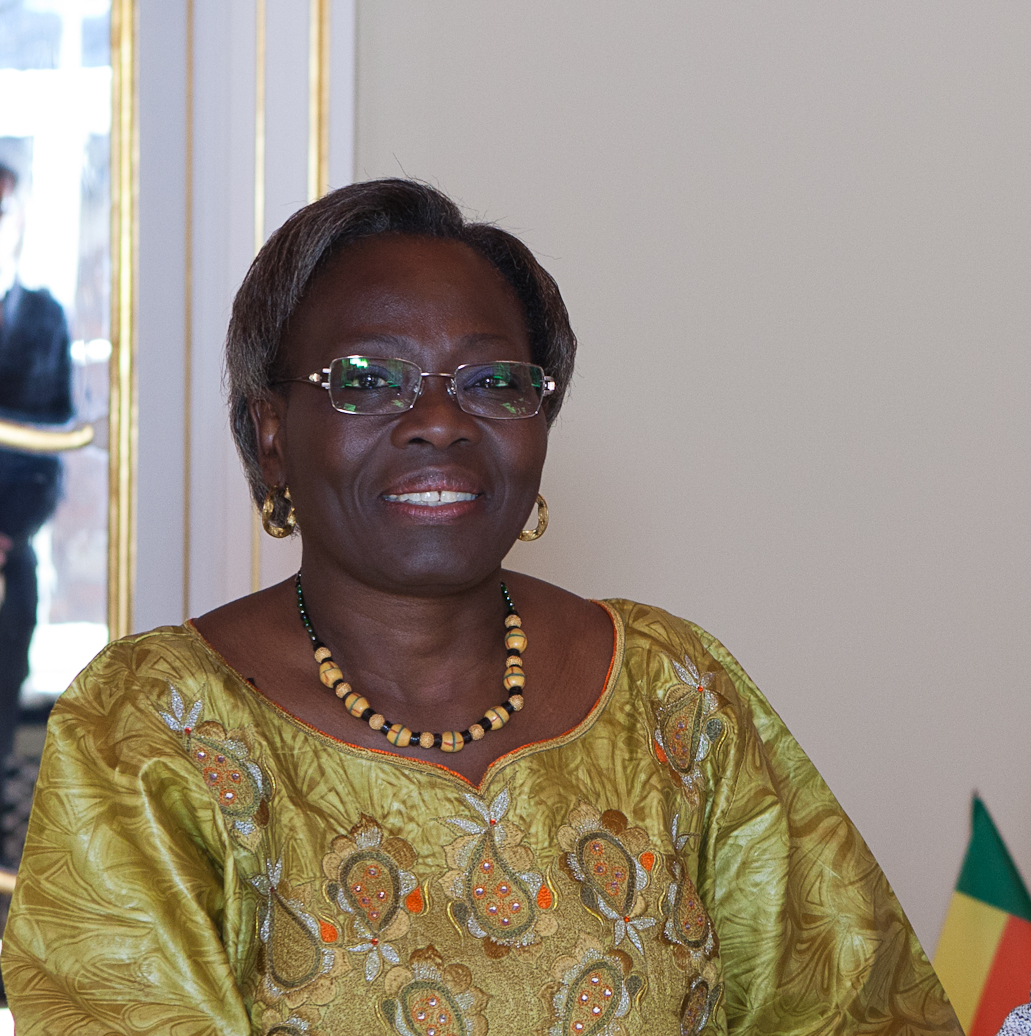
- Arlette Dagnon Vignikin, 2011
- Born: 17 November 1951 (age 74); Ouidah
- Education: ESCAE-University
- Occupation: Ambassador
- Children: 3

Arlette Claudine Kpèdétin Dagnon Vignikin (born 17 November 1951) is an ambassador of Benin. She has represented her country in the nations of Scandinavia and the Baltic.

== Life ==
Vignikin was born in Benin in the city of Ouidah in 1951. She was educated in international public law at ESCAE-University in Benin. She has a "Diplôme d'Etudes Supérieures Spécialisées (DESS)" in international law. She later studied French-Russian translation in Kyiv.

She is a career diplomat. She was the first woman to be an ambassador of Benin and posted abroad. She is a Plenipotentiary Minister of Foreign Affairs. Before she became an ambassador, Vignikin held high responsibilities in the Ministry of Foreign Affairs, as well as serving in Benin's Diplomatic missions abroad. She was: Head of the Department of America, Minister Counselor and Chargé d'Affaires of the Embassy of Benin in the People's Republic of China and at the Benin's Embassy in France.

In August 2008, she was appointed Extraordinary and Plenipotentiary Ambassador of the Republic of Benin to Denmark with jurisdiction over the other Scandinavian countries, the Baltic countries and the Republic of Iceland. On 12 February 2009 she was accredited to the Norwegian government in Oslo. On 30 April 2009 she was accredited to the Estonian government in Tallinn. She was accredited in Latvia on 19 April 2011. Benin had diplomatic relations with Latvia since 1997 but she was the first ambassador. She was later accredited in Sweden assisted by Sven Hirdman.

== Private life ==
Vignikin is married and is the mother of three children.
