= École Normale Supérieure de Fontenay-aux-Roses =

French higher education institution for women

École normale supérieure de Fontenay-aux-Roses
- Other name: ENS de Fontenay
- Motto: L'enseignement par la recherche, pour la recherche
- Motto in English: Teaching through research, for research
- Type: Public
- Active: 1880–10 July 1987
- Location: Fontenay-aux-Roses, France

The École normale supérieure de Fontenay-aux-Roses (ENS de Fontenay-aux-Roses or ENS de Fontenay), established by decree in 1880, was a French higher education institution reserved for women, aimed at training teachers and instructors for primary normal schools.

In 1981, coeducation was introduced and, in 1987, the center specialized in humanities and social sciences, renamed École normale supérieure de Fontenay-Saint-Cloud. The teaching of exact and applied sciences was transferred to the École Normale Supérieure de Lyon.

== History ==
A century after the creation of the first Normal School (later located on Rue Ulm in Paris), Jules Ferry, with Ferdinand Buisson and pastor Félix Pécaut, established the Higher Normal Schools of Fontenay-aux-Roses for girls (1880), and two years later in Saint-Cloud for boys (1882). Both were located in the Paris region, one in the national park of Saint-Cloud (Pavillon de Valois); the other in the town of Fontenay-aux-Roses, in a building constructed by a disciple of Henri Labrouste. Before the merger of the schools, students from the Saint-Cloud school were nicknamed «Cloutiers», while the girls were known under the name of «Fontenaisiennes».

The institution's primary mission was to train new generations of primary education teachers and the first inspectors of primary education. Under the Vichy regime, the schools were named National Preparatory Schools for Teaching in Colleges, and after the Liberation, they took the name Higher Normal Schools Preparatory for Secondary Education Teaching. In 1954, the teaching staff became civil servants, while like the other ENS, under the impetus of the Minister of National Education André Marie, they expanded their mission. From the early 1950s, they were authorized to prepare for the agrégation exam, and then, in 1966, their curriculum was reformed following the model of the École normale supérieure de Paris on Rue Ulm. Thus, they could also officially prepare their students for higher education teaching. In 1976, a profound restructuring of all the ENS took place. Some humanities sections like those of the École normale supérieure de Cachan were moved to Fontenay-aux-Roses and Saint-Cloud, which became coeducational in 1981.

On 10 July 1987, the humanities departments of the Fontenay and Saint-Cloud ENSs were merged into the Fontenay-Saint-Cloud ENS in Paris, while the scientific sections of the two dissolved ENSs were merged into the new École normale supérieure de Lyon, and were installed in the Gerland district. In 2000, the humanities sections also moved to Lyon, in the new buildings constructed in Gerland by architect Henri Gaudin.

== Directors ==
- Félix Pécaut (1880–1896);
  - Jeanne de Friedberg, delegate (1880–1890);
  - Lucie Saffroy, delegate (1890–1897);
- Jules Steeg, (1896–1898);
- Jeanne Dejean de La Bâtie, first delegate (1897–1898) then director (1898–1917);
- Anne-Marie Grauvogel (1917–1935);
- Marguerite Dard (1935–1943);
- Andrée Pardes (1943–1944);
- Marguerite Dard, (1945–1948);
- Louise Maugendre, director of the ENS de Fontenay-aux-Roses (1948–1961);
- Marguerite Cordier, director of the ENS de Fontenay-aux-Roses (1961–1974);
- Jacqueline Bonnamour, director of the ENS de Fontenay-aux-Roses (1974–1985).

== Tribute ==
The song Fontenay-aux-Roses by Maxime Le Forestier, from 1972, is a tribute to the normaliennes of the ENS of Fontenay-aux-Roses, where the singer lived for a period of his life.

== Bibliography ==
- Yvonne Oulhiou (1981). L'École normale supérieure de Fontenay-aux-Roses à travers le temps (1880-1980). Fontenay-aux-Roses: École normale supérieure de Fontenay-aux-Roses. pp. 312 + 16..
