= ESCAE-University, Benin =

Technology university in Cotonou, Benin

Coordinates: 6°26′12″N 2°20′23″E

Ecole Supérieure des Sciences, de Commerce et d'Administration des Entreprises

Location
- Porto novo, Djêgan kpêvi, Rue Ricos campos West Africa; Cotounou, Port Novo; Benin

Information
- School type: Private University
- Motto: E Pluribus Unum
- Founded: 2008
- Founders: Dr. MEHOBA D. Théodore
- Status: Active
- School code: EBU
- President: Dr. MEHOBA D. Théodore
- Campuses: Cotonou, Port Novo
- Nickname: ESCAE BENIN
- Accreditation: Ministère de l'Enseignement Supérieur et de la Recherche Scientifique
- Website: escaebenin.edu.bj

ESCAE - Benin (Ecole Supérieure de Commerce et d'Administration des Entreprises du Benin (ESCAE BENIN University) is a technology university in Benin.

ESCAE was established in October 2008 by Mehoba D. Théodore, Doctor in Economics and Management Science

ESCAE was granted accreditation by the Minister of Higher Education and officially inaugurated in October 2012.

ESCAE is recognized by the Directorate of Evaluation and Accreditation of Federal Ministry of Education Nigeria and other West African countries. ESCAE is also recognized by International Association of Universities
