= Café Gondrée =

Small coffeehouse in Bénouville, France

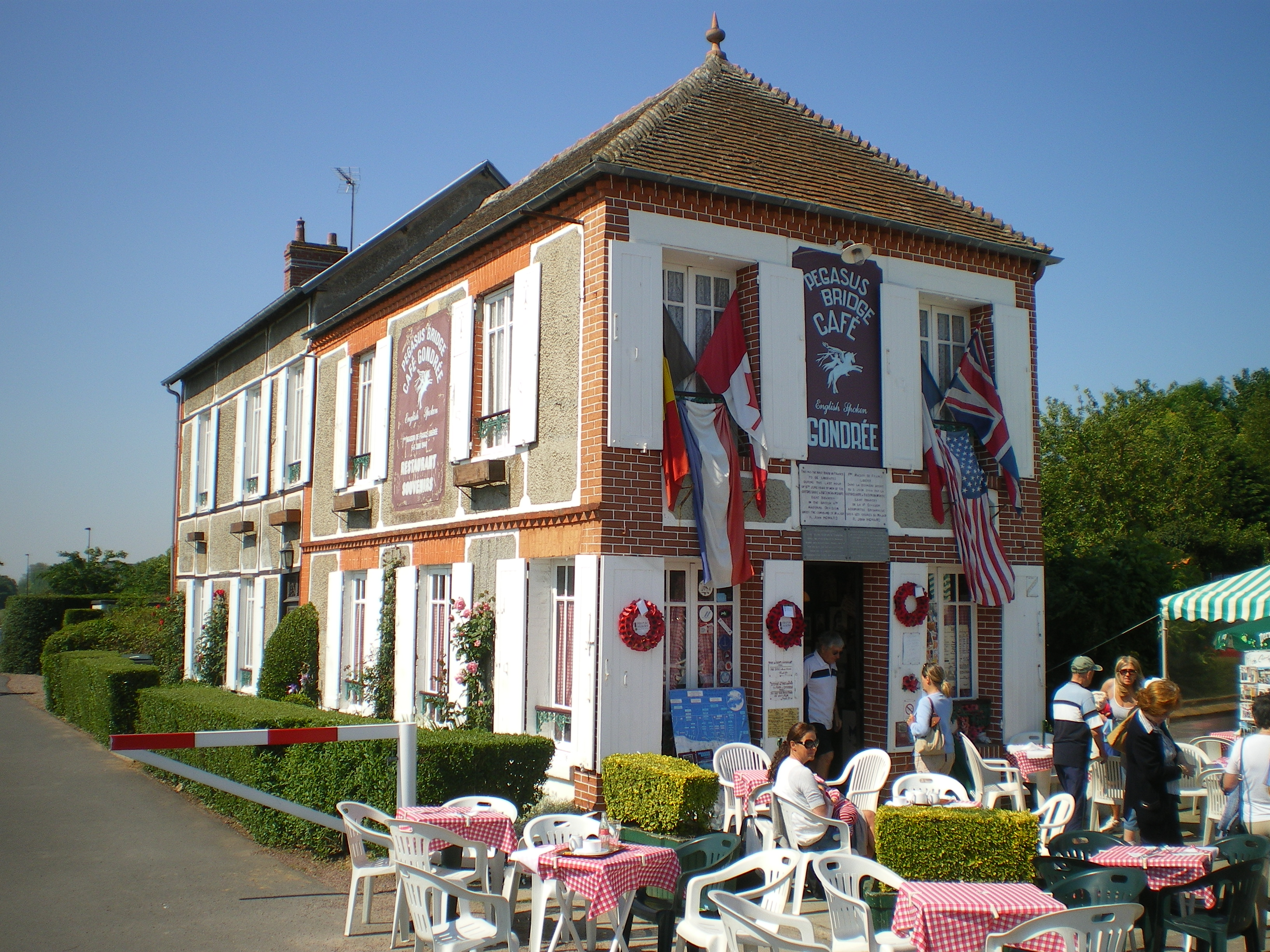
- The Café Gondrée in 2009
- Location: Bénouville
- Coordinates: 49°14′32.7″N 00°16′29.9″W
- Built: 1892

The Café Gondrée is a small coffeehouse in the French community of Bénouville. The cafe is located on the west bank of the Caen Canal, at the northwest end of the Bénouville Bridge, now commonly referred to as the Pegasus Bridge. The building was the site of first combat during the D-Day invasion, and is best known for its role commemorating those events.

== History ==
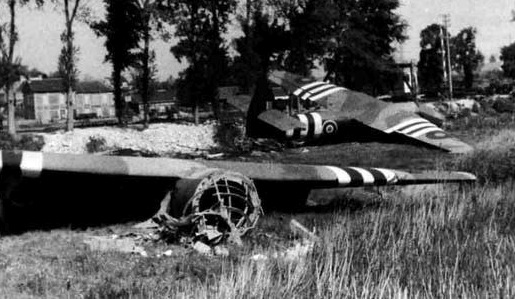
Howard's Horsa gliders landed a hundred yards from the bridge. The Café Gondrée can be seen in the background

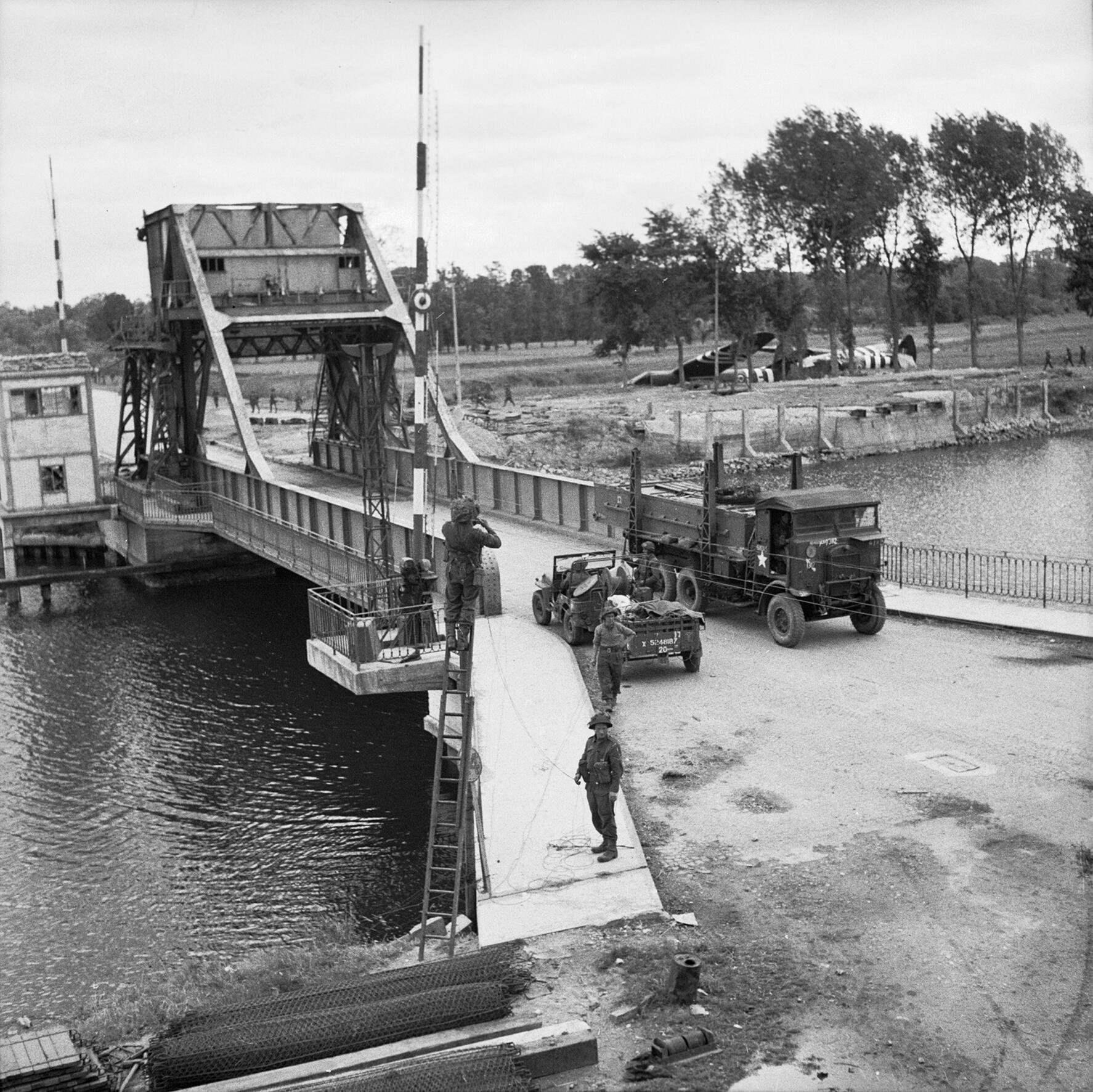
The Bénouville Bridge, 9 June 1944. Howard's wrecked gliders can be seen in the background

The two-story red brick building was built at the end of the 19th century. The nearby Bénouville Bridge was a key objective of the British 6th Airborne Division. A unit of Glider infantry of the division's 2nd Battalion was to land, take the bridge intact and hold it until relieved. The unit was led by Major John Howard. Howard and his men boarded three gliders. Released at 8,000 feet in the pitch black of a storm filled night, all three gliders managed to make a rough landing in a field almost directly on top of their objective. Leaving the broken gliders, the men engaged in a short, fierce firefight which ended with the British paratroopers in control of the bridge. The structure claims without certainty to be the first French house to be liberated, although in the book Commando du Pont Pegase, French historian Norbert Hugedé writes that the house owned by Mr Picot was liberated earlier. Detailed accounts of other historians, such as British 6th Airborne Division specialist Neil Barber (in his book The Pegasus And Orne Bridges) and French Battle of Normandy specialist Marc Laurenceau (in his book Historial du Jour J et de la bataille de Normandie), confirm that this house was not liberated at the start of the fighting, unlike other buildings such as the Picot cafe or the former tramway station (the latter no longer in existence).

At the time of these events the café was run by Georges and Thérèse Gondrée. They had been involved in the French Resistance, and had passed on information about the defences around the bridge to British intelligence through the French underground. Thérèse spoke Alsatian so was able to understand and pass on information from German soldiers talking in the café.

The successful taking of the bridge played an important role in limiting the effectiveness of a German counter-attack in the days and weeks following the Normandy invasion.

== After the war ==
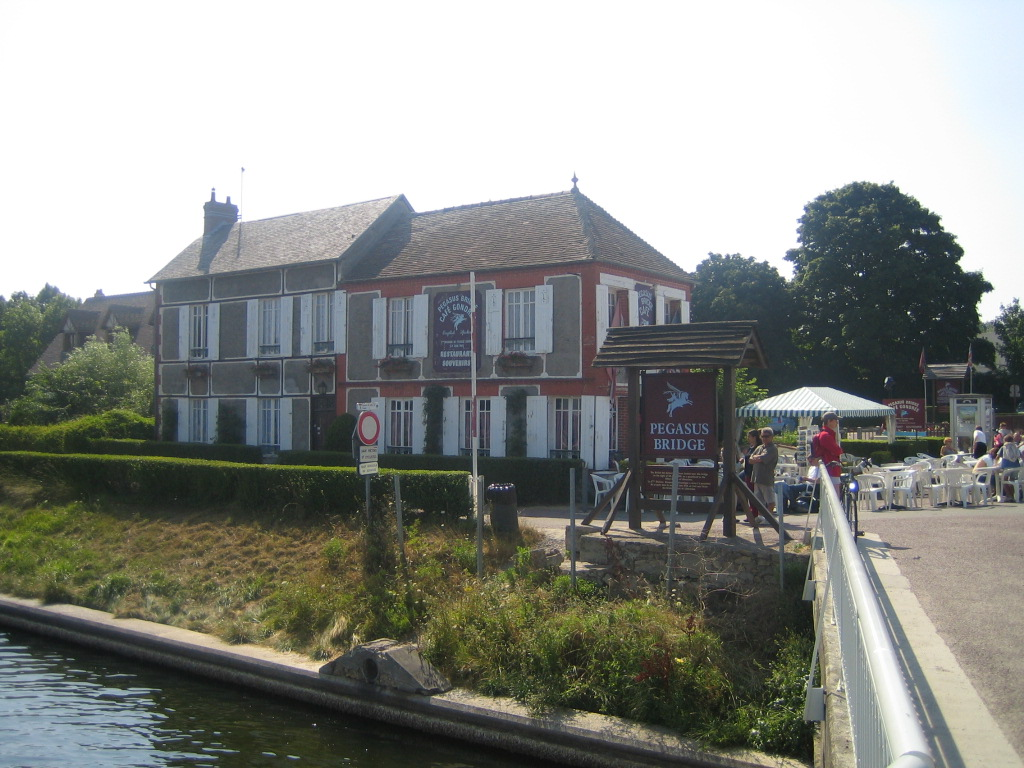
Café Gondrée as approached from the bridge

After the war the café became a place of honour for the men who came and fought in the Normandy campaign. British paratroopers celebrate the D-Day anniversary at the café every 5 June, with champagne offered to the veterans present at 11:16 pm. The walls of the café are decorated with shoulder patch badges, regimental insignia, old uniforms, helmets and photos of the leaders of the operation.

With the passing of the Gondrées, ownership was taken over by their daughter, Arlette Gondrée, who was four years old at the time of their liberation. In 2024 she was appointed a Chevalier of the Ordre national du Mérite for her work to commemorate the liberation.

The café was also a destination for speakers at the military lectures that the war colleges put on in Normandy in the summers each year. Officers involved in the Normandy battles were asked by the war colleges to return to Normandy and speak of their experiences fighting there, and included such men as Major General "Pip" Roberts, Brigadier David Stileman, Major John Howard (British Army officer) and Colonel Hans von Luck, an officer with the 21st Panzer Division. Because the owners were still severely anti-German, Howard covered for Luck by passing him off as Swedish.

The Café Gondrée still serves as a café, though it is now known as the Pegasus Bridge Café. On 5 June 1987 it was listed as an Historical Monument.
