= Félix Pécaut =

French educationalist (1828–1898)

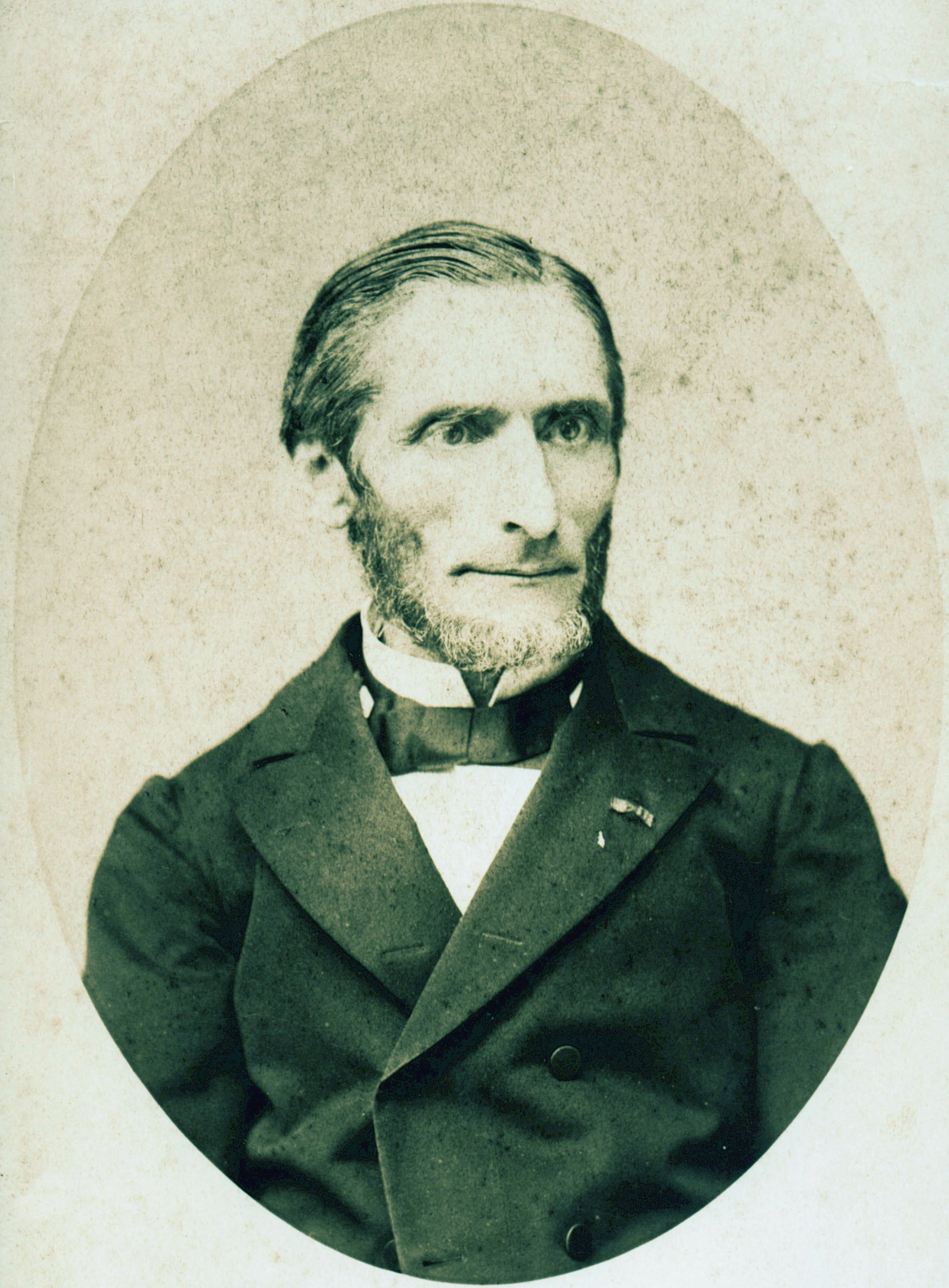
- Photograph of Pécaut
- Born: 1828; Salies-de-Béarn, Pyrénées-Atlantiques, France
- Died: 31 July 1898 (aged 69–70)
- Occupation: Educationalist
- Known for: Teaching

Félix Pécaut (1828 – 31 July 1898) was a French educationalist and a member of an old Huguenot family.

== Life ==
He was born at Salies-de-Béarn, Pyrénées-Atlantiques in 1828. He was for some months an evangelical pastor at Salies de Béarn, but he had no pretence of sympathy with ecclesiastical authority. He was consequently compelled to resign his pastorate, and for some years occupied himself by urging the claims of a liberal Christianity.

In 1879, he conducted a general inspection of primary education for the French government, and several similar missions followed. His fame chiefly rests in his successful organization of the training school for women teachers at Fontenay-aux-Roses, to which he devoted fifteen years of ceaseless toil. He died on 31 July 1898.

A summary of his educational views is given in his Public Education and National Life (1897).

He was a Christian pacifist.
