= Arlette Schneiders =

Luxembourgish architect

Arlette Schneiders is a Luxembourgish architect who in 1989 was the first female architect in Luxembourg to establish her own practice.

== Biography ==
Inspired by the work of Frank Lloyd Wright, Schneiders studied architecture at the Institut Saint-Luc in Brussels, graduating when she was just 25. She embarked on her career at Théo Worré's practice in Luxembourg. Two years later, she decided to continue her studies in Rome where she spent four years studying the restoration of old buildings. On her return to Luxembourg, she decided to work with Claude Schmitz but was frustrated by the difficulty she had in completing her projects in what in the late 1980s was still a man's world. As a result, she decided to set up her own business becoming the first women in Luxembourg to run a practice free of male influence.

After a number of fairly small assignments, she was successful in winning a social housing competition which in turn encouraged her to participate in a European competition in 1997. The selection committee awarded her first prize with a commission to carry out renovation work at the Fish Market in Luxembourg City. Her success in adding modern features to a group of old houses led to her winning the Luxembourg Architecture Prize in 2004. She went on to design a number of administrative buildings including the Plaza in the city centre, the E-Building in Munsbach, and two large buildings on Kirchberg, the Unico (12,000 m2) and the Axento (18,500 m2). In 2011, she won a competition for designing an even larger building in the same area, requiring a combination of office space and shopping facilities.

== Works ==
Arlette Schneiders' major works include:

- Fonds de compensation building, Kirchberg, Luxembourg: Luxembourg Architecture Prize, in collaboration with KCAP, May 2010, four volumes, 22,300 m2.
- Axento building, Kirchberg, Luxembourg City: two-volume administrative and commercial building, 12,200 m2, concrete, glazed facades, bronze-tinted aluminium, completed in 2009.
- Unico administrative building, Kirchberg, Luxembourg City: 8,928 m2, natural stone facade, some wood facing, completed 2007.
- Rénovation de l'Ilot B, rue du Palais de Justice, Luxembourg City: 5,000 m2, completed 2004.
- Plaza administrative building, Boulevard Grande Duchesse Charlotte, Luxembourg City: 4,850 m2, completed 2004.*Primary School, Eich-Mühlenbach, Luxembourg: 26,000 m2, 14 classrooms plus sports and ancillary rooms, granite-finished facade, completed in 2003.
