= Arlette Sombo-Dibélé =

Central African politician

Minister of the Environment, Sustainable Development, Water and Forests, Hunting and Fishing
- In office 11 April 2016 – 12 September 2017
- President: Faustin-Archange Touadéra
- Prime Minister: Simplice Sarandji
- Preceded by: Sébastien Wénézoui
- Succeeded by: Thierry Kamach

Personal details
- Born: 8 December 1958 (age 67)
- Education: University of Bangui
- Occupation: Lawyer; Politician

Arlette Sombo-Dibélé (born 8 December 1958) is a Central African lawyer and politician.

== Early life and education ==
Dibélé was born on 8 December 1958. She earned a law degree and continued her postgraduate education at the University of Bangui, taking a private law degree specializing in judicial careers.

== Judicial career ==
Dibélé joined and worked at the Central African Bar for over ten years. She was also employed at the Central African Constitutional Court for seven years and four months. After Touadera was declared as the winner of the 2020–21 Central African general election, she received appeals from 10 candidates over the election fraud and filed those pleas.

Throughout her judicial career, she has been a lawyer to Karim Meckassoua, Dieudonné Ndomaté, Juan Rémy Quignolot, Aurélien Simplice Zingas, Thierry Georges Vackat, Yvon Konaté, Thierry Savonarole Maleyombo, and Moussa Kitoko. In 2022, she managed to acquit Ludovic Ngaïfé, Maleyombo, Konaté, and Ndomate.

Apart from that, she is also the founder of a civil organization of the Group of Action of Civil Society Organizations for the Defense of the Constitution of March 30, 2016 (G-16).

On 15 June 2019, an alleged presidential guard personnel threw a grenade at her, and she survived an assassination attempt. Apart from that, she also received death threats from a Touadera supporter, Euloge Doctrouvé Koï, on 19 September 2022.

== Political career ==
Sarandji appointed Dibélé the Minister of the Environment, Sustainable Development, Water and Forests, Hunting and Fishing on 11 April 2016. As the environment minister, the Central African Republic sided with the Egypt-led group, which implored the industrialized countries' transparency and traceability in their contributions to financing climate change programs. She also endorsed the Paris Agreement. Other than that, in the Green Fund workshop that was held on 13 December 2016, she recommended to the private sector operators "to review their legal text and to give importance to acquiring procedures allowing them to access financing from the Green Fund."

Dibélé stepped down as minister on 12 September 2017 and was not included in the Sarandji II Cabinet. She claimed that her dismissal was due to her attempt to suppress the embezzlement.

== Recognition ==
Oubangui Medias named Dibélé one of the top 10 Central African women in 2022.
