= Albert Guinon =

French playwright

Albert Guinon (1863–1923) was a French playwright.

== Works ==
- Seul, two-act play;
- A qui la faute, one-act comedy, Paris: Paul Ollendorf, 1892
- Le bonheur; comédie en trois actes, par Albert Guinon ... [Paris, L’Illustration] c1911. 32 p. illus. 29 cm.
- Remarques autour de la guerre (1914-1915). Paris, Librairie théâtrale, artistique et littéraire, c1916. 156 p. 19 cm.
- Nouvelles remarques autour de la guerre (1916-1919), Paris, Librairie théâtrale, artistique & littéraire, 1920.
- Son père; comédie en quatre actes. [Paris] c. 1907.
- Décadence; Paris, Librairie théâtrale [1901?] 3 p. l., [ix]-x, [2], 268 p. 19 cm.
