= Jean-Pierre Ramis =

French mathematician

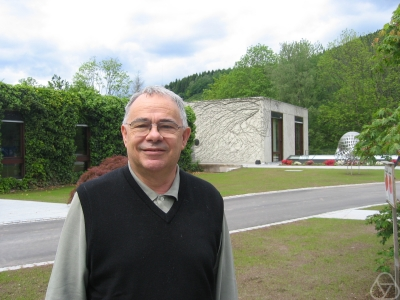
Jean-Pierre Ramis in Oberwolfach in 2008

Jean-Pierre Ramis, born in 1943, is a French mathematician and a member of the French Academy of Sciences.

His work concerns the dynamic systems of complex field functions, discrete (difference equations and q-differences) and continuous (differential equations), in particular the notions of integrability (Morales-Ramis theory) and the Galois differential theory.

In 1982, Ramis received the Prix Paul Doistau–Émile Blutet.

== Bibliography ==
- Mathématiques tout-en-un pour la Licence, Dunod, 2013 (Préface d'Alain Connes)
- Mathématiques tout-en-un pour la Licence 2, Dunod, 2014
- Mathématiques tout-en-un pour la Licence 3, Dunod, 2015
- Cours de Mathématiques pures et appliquées, De Boeck, 2010
