= Arlette Alcock =

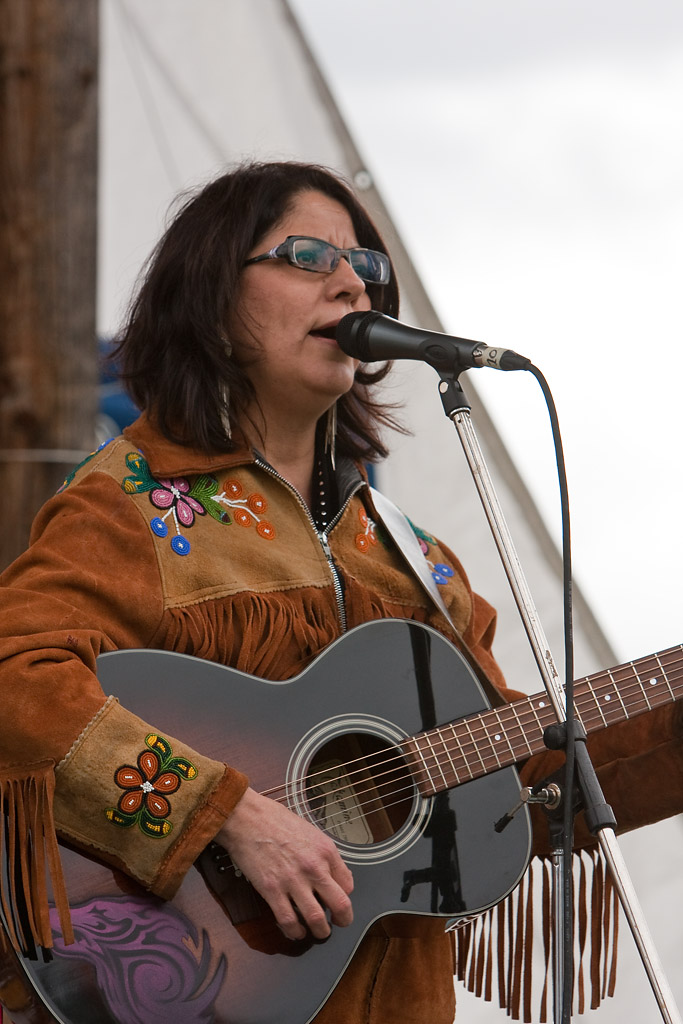
- Arlette Alcock Performing at the Nighthawk Aboriginal Arts and Music Festival in 2010

Background information
- Born: Arlette Christine Aida Brabant; 8 October 1958 (age 68); Trail, B.C., Canada
- Genres: Folk, Country
- Occupation: Singer-songwriter
- Instruments: Vocals, guitar
- Years active: 1997–present
- Website: www.arlettemusic.com

Arlette Alcock (born Arlette Christine Aida Brabant, 8 October 1958) is a Métis-Canadian folk musician, songwriter and social activist. Arlette is best known for performing her outspoken songs which detail the past and current challenges facing Métis and Indigenous people. Since 1997 she has released two full-length albums and two EPs of original music under the mononym Arlette. Her music has received extensive Aboriginal radio airplay in Canada and the United States. Arlette has been nominated for a variety of Aboriginal music awards in North America and won the Songwriter of the Year award at the Native-E Music Awards in Albuquerque, New Mexico, in 2008. Her songs Midnight Mass Graves (2021) and Kimowan (2023) both achieved positions within the top 20 on the Indigenous Music Countdown.

== Career ==
Arlette began writing poetry and playing guitar when she was a teenager, building a reputation as a songwriter. Her writing focuses on her Indigenous heritage, spirituality, racism and residential school abuse.

Her debut album Tribe of One was released in 1997. Her second album, Wolfgirl was produced by Grammy Award Nominee Gaye Delorme and released in 2007. Both albums received airplay on Aboriginal Radio stations in Canada and the United States, as well as the CBC National Radio in Canada.

In 2008 Arlette won the Songwriter of the Year award at the Native-E Music Awards, in Albuquerque, New Mexico. She was nominated for Best Folk Recording at the Native American Music Awards the same year, and her single "Her Suitcase" was an Honor Award Finalist for acoustic folk single in the 2008 Great American Song Contest.

Arlette has been featured on the Aboriginal Peoples Television Network show Beyond Words, is a member of the National Aboriginal Recording Industry Association and has collaborated with many other notable Métis Canadian musicians including Cheryl l'Hirondelle, Sandy Scofield, and Janet Panic. She has performed at many Aboriginal and Métis events, including the Night Hawk Aboriginal Music Festival, International Aboriginal Day and the Missing Women's March in Vancouver; and at National Aboriginal Day, Honouring Our Sisters and the Métis Rendezvouse in Kelowna.

In 2021 Arlette released a 5 song EP of new material, produced by Janet Panic. The title track ′Midnight Mass Graves′reached the #15 position on the Indigenous Music Countdown.

In 2022 Arlette released a second 5 song EP titled 'Birch Lake'. The single from this EP, 'Kimowan', remained within the top 40 on the Indigenous Music Countdown for 11 consecutive weeks climbing to the #10 position in December of 2023.

== Personal life ==
Arlette Alcock was born in Trail, British Columbia on 8 October 1958 to Roseline Chartrand, of the Pine Creek First Nation of Manitoba and Raymond Adam Brabant, of the Little Black Bear First Nation of Saskatchewan.

Arlette is a Métis descendant of Pine Creek Saulteaux Anishinaabe, and Irish lineage on her mother's side, together with Little Black Bear Cree and French ancestry on her father's side. Her parents were both Canadian residential school alumni.

In addition to her career as a musician, Arlette has also worked as a library technician for the Federation of Saskatchewan Indian Nations, the Union of BC Indian Chiefs, and the First Nations University of Canada in Prince Albert, Saskatchewan.

Arlette is a vocal advocate for many social justice issues in Canada including missing and murdered Indigenous women (MMIW), the protection of women's reproductive rights and people living with addictions in Vancouver's Downtown Eastside, where her mother died in 1988. Her mother's story is referenced in the lyrics of her song 'Roseline'.

== Discography ==
Year	Album
1997	Tribe of one
2007	Wolfgirl

Year	EP
2021	Midnight Mass Graves
2022	Birch Lake
