= Positively invariant set =

In mathematical analysis, a positively (or positive) invariant set is a set with the following properties:

Suppose $\dot{x}=f(x)$ is a dynamical system, $x(t,x_0)$ is a trajectory, and $x_0$ is the initial point. Let $\mathcal{O} := \left \lbrace x \in \mathbb{R}^n\mid \varphi (x) = 0 \right \rbrace$ where $\varphi$ is a real-valued function. The set $\mathcal{O}$ is said to be positively invariant if $x_0 \in \mathcal{O}$ implies that $x(t,x_0) \in \mathcal{O} \ \forall \ t \ge 0$

In other words, once a trajectory of the system enters $\mathcal{O}$, it will never leave it again.
