= Arlette Nougarède =

French cell biologist

Arlette Nougarède, wife Lance, born in 1930 in Narbonne, is a cell biologist specializing in plant development from embryogenesis to flowering. She was Professor Emeritus at Pierre and Marie Curie University from 1992 to 2013. She has been a corresponding member of the French Academy of sciences since 1987.

== Biography ==
After her graduate studies in Paris, she obtained, at the École Normale Supérieure (ENS, 1952), a DES, prepared under the direction of Professor Roger Buvat. She began her career at the CNRS (1953), passed her State thesis (February 1958) and became a supervisor at the ENS (1960), preparing for the agrégation, recruited her first thesis students and then became Professor (1964) at the University Pierre et Marie Curie, Paris, where she developed her laboratory of Experimental Cytology and Plant Morphogenesis (CEMV), directed the DEA of the same name and integrated new thesis students and numerous trainees. Arlette Nougarède taught in all cycles until 1992 when she ended her career as Professor Emeritus, exceptional class 2.

The CEMV laboratory has regularly welcomed renowned foreign Professors: G. Bernier (Belgium), E.M. Gifford (USA), P.E. Pilet (Switzerland), C. Sterling (USA), S. Tepfer (USA), D. Francis (England), N. Bagni (Italy), who have come for collaborative work or to adapt to their equipment the new technologies developed in the team.

After her retirement, Arlette Nougarède continues her activities in the laboratory of Professor Dominique Chriqui (proofreading of theses, critical review of articles, participation in various juries and commissions, including the Neology and Terminology Commission of the French Academy of sciences).

== Scientific Works ==
Arlette Nougarède's research focuses on the primary meristems of higher plants (structural and ultrastructural cytology; cytochemistry, DNA, RNA, proteins; functioning, cell cycle).

=== Caulinary meristem ===
After simple mitosis surveys for the vegetative point of Bean, quantitative methods are gradually being used to estimate mean cell, nuclear, nucleolar volumes and to evaluate mitotic and labelling indices, after incorporation, by the meristem, of tritiated precursors of DNA and RNA synthesis. For vegetative caulinary meristem, the notion of 3-component zonation is defended (axial apical zone, reserved territory, lateral leaf initiating zone, medullary meristem giving the pith), defined on cytological and functional criteria. The total duration of the cell cycle, in hours, and that of its phases (G1, S, G2, M) show that the axial apical zone has the longest cycle, the lateral zone the shortest cycle and the medullary meristem a cycle of intermediate duration. In this cycle, the duration of mitosis, M, is not very variable, depending on the zone, and the same is true for synthesis, S, and postsynthesis, G2. Only the presynthesis phase G1, by its lengthening in the axial zone, its shortening in the lateral zone and, to a lesser degree, in the medullary meristem, ensures the control of proliferation in the vegetative meristem.

=== Phases of development ===
There is evidence that the meristem of preferred or strict photoperiodic plants, constantly subjected to light conditions unfavourable to their flowering, evolves towards a new phase: the intermediate phase which is a preparation for flowering for preferred plants with increased yield, an ontogenic dead end for strict plants if favourable light conditions are not received. The following pre-flowering phase is characterized by the reactivation of the axial apical zone, the cessation of foliar initiation and the rapid differentiation of the cells of the medullary meristem. The quantitative and/or qualitative changes in polypeptides and the time at which they occur are specified for each of the phases of development and during initiation of the floral organs.

The cell cycle is stopped at G1 in the meristem of dormant buds, in that of the embryo contained in the seed or in the cotyledonary bud of the fully inhibited Pea. Arlette Nougarède shows, on the Pea model, that there is an increasing gradient of inhibition from the buds located in the axils of the youngest leaves to the cotyledonal bud; the events related to the reactivation of the buds are examined.

=== Root meristem. Geotropic reaction, Lentil, Corn ===
The very first data on the mechanism of the geotropic reaction are acquired - after experiments on starch lysis of statenchyma amyloplasts and - microsurgery of the cuff and meristem. It has been proven that the cap amyloplasts are the geoperceptors and that the curvature of the root, placed in a horizontal position, is achieved in the zone of maximum elongation by growth asymmetry on both sides of the root under the control of an inhibitor from the cap.

=== Rhizogenesis ===
Arlette Nougarède and her team identify, in the whole plant, regions of constant localization, differentiated into G1 and which possess organogenic capacities that neighbouring cells, which have become polyploid, have lost. Various types of rhizogenesis are compared (natural, auxin-induced or Agrobacterium rhizogenes).

Each era has its achievements. In the 20th century, histocytology and ontogenic examination made it possible to understand how plant meristems regularly form cells that differentiate into organ building tissues. These are indisputable data. In the 21st century, molecular biology and mutants are bringing new ideas that will be able to solve still unanswered problems.

== Honours and awards ==
- 1997: Chevalier of the Ordre National de la Légion d'Honneur
- 2014: Officier of the Ordre National de la Légion d'Honneur
- 2006: Officier in the Ordre National du Mérite
- 2018: Commandeur of the Palmes Académiques
- A. Nougarède is a Corresponding Member of the French Academy of sciences, Elected Member of the Botanical Society of America (1988) and listed among the pioneering women in Life Sciences, Plant Biology, by the American Society of Plant Biologists (2005).

== Prizes ==
- 1965: Ernest Dechelle Prize of the French Academy of sciences
- 1976: Paul Doistau - Emile Blutel Prize of the French Academy of sciences
