= Particle-laden flow =

Particle-laden flows refers to a class of two-phase fluid flow, in which one of the phases is continuously connected (referred to as the continuous or carrier phase) and the other phase is made up of small, immiscible, and typically dilute particles (referred to as the dispersed or particle phase). Fine aerosol particles in air is an example of a particle-laden flow; the aerosols are the dispersed phase, and the air is the carrier phase.

The modeling of two-phase flows has a tremendous variety of engineering and scientific applications: pollution dispersion in the atmosphere, fluidization in combustion processes, aerosol deposition in spray medication, along with many others.

== Governing equations ==
The starting point for a mathematical description of almost any type of fluid flow is the classical set of Navier–Stokes equations. To describe particle-laden flows, we must modify these equations to account for the effect of the particles on the carrier, or vice versa, or both - a suitable choice of such added complications depend on a variety of the parameters, for instance, how dense the particles are, how concentrated they are, or whether or not they are chemically reactive. In most real world cases, the particles are very small and occur in low concentrations, hence the dynamics are governed primarily by the continuous phase. A possible way to represent the dynamics of the carrier phase is by the following modified Navier-Stokes momentum equation:

$$\frac{\partial \rho u_i}{dt} + \frac{\partial \rho u_i u_j}{\partial x_j} = - \frac{\partial P}{\partial x_i} +  \frac{\partial \tau_{ij}}{\partial x_j} + S_i,$$

where $S_i$ is a momentum source or sink term, arising from the presence of the particle phase. The above equation is an Eulerian equation, that is, the dynamics are understood from the viewpoint of a fixed point in space. The dispersed phase is typically (though not always) treated in a Lagrangian framework, that is, the dynamics are understood from the viewpoint of fixed particles as they move through space. A usual choice of momentum equation for a particle is:

$$\frac{d v_i}{dt} = \frac{1}{\tau_p} (u_i - v_i),$$

where $u_i$ represents the carrier phase velocity and $v_i$ represents the particle velocity. $\tau_p$ is the particle relaxation time, and represents a typical timescale of the particle's reaction to changes in the carrier phase velocity - loosely speaking, this can be thought of as the particle's inertia with respect to the fluid with contains it. The interpretation of the above equation is that particle motion is hindered by a drag force. In reality, there are a variety of other forces which act on the particle motion (such as gravity, Basset history and added mass) – as described through for instance the Basset–Boussinesq–Oseen equation. However, for many physical examples, in which the density of the particle far exceeds the density of the medium, the above equation is sufficient. A typical assumption is that the particles are spherical, in which case the drag is modeled using Stokes drag assumption:

$$\tau_p = \frac{\rho_p d_p^2}{18 \mu}.$$

Here $d_p$ is the particle diameter, $\rho_p$, the particle density and $\mu$, the dynamic viscosity of the carrier phase. More sophisticated models contain the correction factor:

$$\tau_p = \frac{\rho_p d_p^2}{18 \mu} (1 + 0.15 Re_p^{0.687})^{-1},$$

where $Re_p$ is the particle Reynolds number, defined as:

$$Re_p = \frac{| \vec{u} - \vec{v} | d_p}{\nu}.$$

== Coupling ==
If the mass fraction of the dispersed phase is small, then one-way coupling between the phases is a reasonable assumption; that is, the dynamics of the particle phase are affected by the carrier phase, but the reverse is not the case. However, if the mass fraction of the dispersed phase is large, the interaction of the dynamics between the two phases must be considered - this is two-way coupling. For large mass fractions of particles in turbulent flows, particles are observed to remove energy from the large scales, and return it to the flow at the small scales.

A problem with the Lagrangian treatment of the dispersed phase is that once the number of particles becomes large, it may require a prohibitive amount of computational power to track a sufficiently large sample of particles required for statistical convergence. In addition, if the particles are sufficiently light, they behave essentially like a second fluid. In this case, an Eulerian treatment of the dispersed phase is sensible.

== Modeling ==
Like all fluid dynamics-related disciplines, the modelling of particle-laden flows is an enormous challenge for researchers - this is because most flows of practical interest are turbulent.

Direct numerical simulations (DNS) for single-phase flow, let alone two-phase flow, are computationally very expensive; the computing power required for models of practical engineering interest are far out of reach. Since one is often interested in modeling only large scale qualitative behavior of the flow, a possible approach is to decompose the flow velocity into mean and fluctuating components, by the Reynolds-averaged Navier-Stokes (RANS) approach. A compromise between DNS and RANS is large eddy simulation (LES), in which the small scales of fluid motion are modeled and the larger, resolved scales are simulated directly.

Experimental observations, as well as DNS indicate that an important phenomenon to model is preferential concentration. Particles (particularly those with Stokes number close to 1) are known to accumulate in regions of high shear and low vorticity (such as turbulent boundary layers), and the mechanisms behind this phenomenon are not well understood. Moreover, particles are known to migrate down turbulence intensity gradients (this process is known as turbophoresis). These features are particularly difficult to capture using RANS or LES-based models since too much time-varying information is lost.

Due to these difficulties, existing turbulence models tend to be ad hoc, that is, the range of applicability of a given model is usually suited toward a highly specific set of parameters (such as geometry, dispersed phase mass loading and particle reaction time), and are also restricted to low Reynolds numbers (whereas the Reynolds number of flows of engineering interest tend to be very high).

== Preferential migration ==
An interesting aspect of particle-laden flows is preferential migration of particles to certain regions within the fluid flow. This is often characterized by the Stokes number (St) of the particles. At low St, particles tend to act as tracers and are uniformly distributed. At high St, particles are heavy and are influenced less by the fluid and more by its inertia. At intermediate St, particles are affected by both the fluid motion and its inertia, which gives rise to several interesting behaviors. This is especially true in wall-bounded flows where there is a velocity gradient near the wall.

One of the earliest works describing preferential migration is the experimental work of Segre and Silberberg. They showed that a neutrally buoyant particle in a laminar pipe flow comes to an equilibrium position between the wall and the axis. This is referred to as the Segré–Silberberg effect. Saffman explained this in terms of the force acting on the particle when it experiences a velocity gradient across it. Feng et al. have studied this through detailed direct numerical simulations and have elaborated on the physical mechanism of this migration.

Recently it was found that even for non-neutrally buoyant particles similar preferential migration occurs . At low St, the particles tend to settle at an equilibrium position while for high St, the particles begin to oscillate about the center of the channel.

The behavior becomes even interesting in turbulent flows. Here, the turbophoretic force (transport of particles down gradients of turbulent kinetic energy) causes a high concentration of particles near the walls. Experimental and particle-resolved DNS studies have explained the mechanism of this migration in terms of the Saffman lift and the turbophoretic force . These preferential migration are of significant importance to several applications where wall-bounded particle-laden flows are encountered and is an active area of research.
