= Boutet de Monvel =

Boutet de Monvel or Monvel may refer to:

- Anne Boutet de Monvel, French mathematician, married to Louis
- Bernard Boutet de Monvel (1881–1949), French painter; son of Louis-Maurice
- Jacques Marie Boutet de Monvel (1745–1812), French actor and dramatist better known as Jacques Marie Boutet
- Louis Boutet de Monvel (1941–2014), French mathematician, married to Anne
- Louis-Maurice Boutet de Monvel (1851–1913), French painter and illustrator
- Roger Boutet de Monvel (1879–1951), French writer; son of Louis-Maurice
