= Monvel =

Monvel may refer to:

== Places ==
- Monvel, Gujarat, western India, a village on Saurashtra peninsula
- Monvel State, India, a former princely state in Sorath Prant of Kathiawar, with seat in the above town

== People ==
- Pseudonym of French actor and comic playwright Jacques Marie Boutet (1745–1812)
- Louis Boutet de Monvel, (1941–2014), French mathematician
- Louis-Maurice Boutet de Monvel (1850–1913), French painter and illustrator
