= Gilles Lebeau =

French mathematician

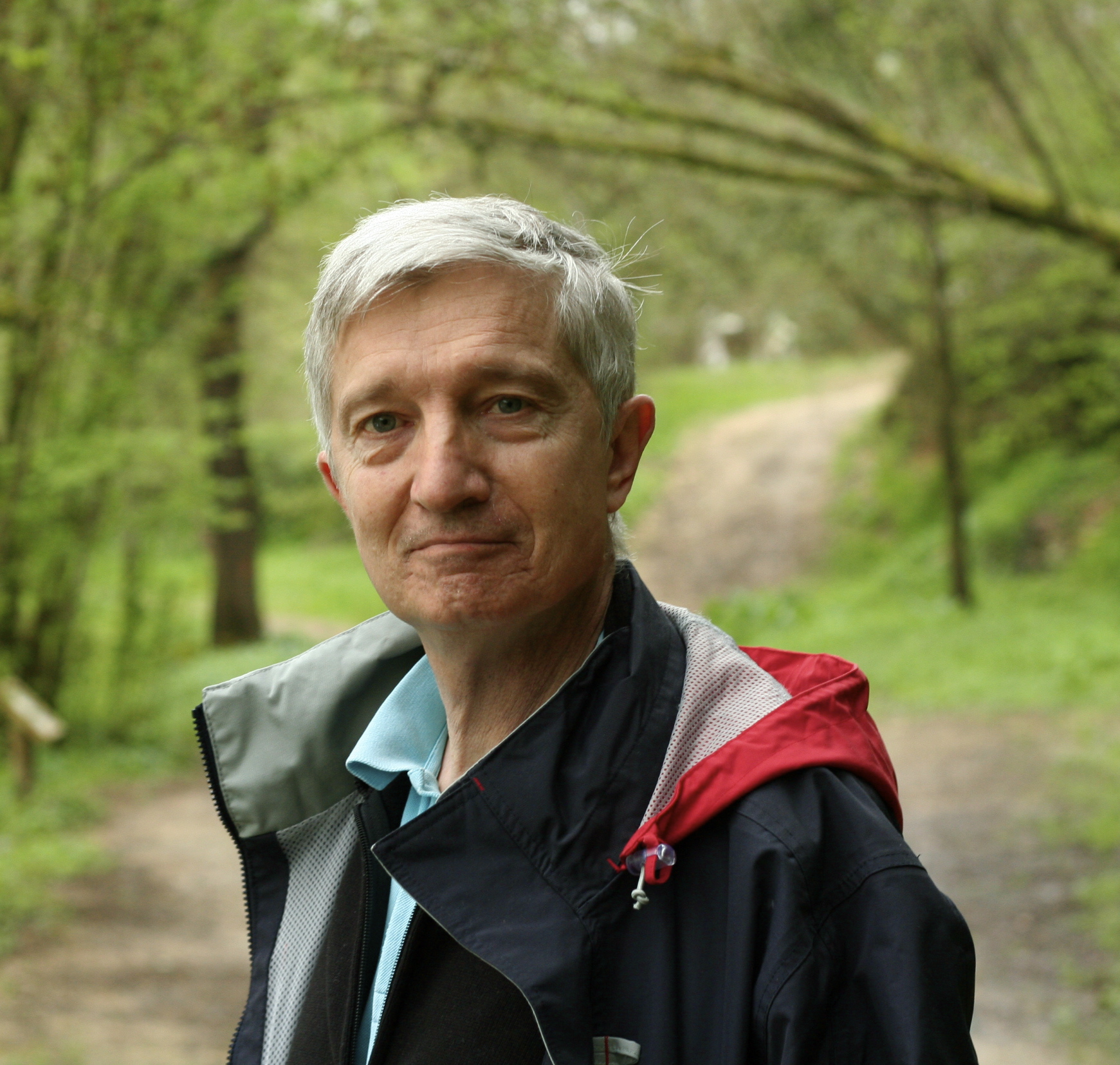
Gilles Lebeau

Gilles Lebeau is a French mathematician born on 17 November 1954, professor at the University of Nice Sophia-Antipolis (since 2001), member of the Institut universitaire de France (since 2003) and member of the Académie des sciences (since 2005).

== School career and teaching ==
Gilles Lebeau is a former student of the École normale supérieure (ENS) de la rue d'Ulm (class of S1974). Lebeau studied from 1974 to 1978 at the ENS with agrégation in 1976. There he graduated in 1978 with Thèse de troisième cycle and in 1983 with Thèse d'État under the supervision of Louis Boutet de Monvel. Lebeau has been a professor at the University of Orsay and at the École Polytechnique.

== Scientific awards and honours ==
- BM France Award (1988)
- Invited speaker at the International Congress of Mathematicians in Kyoto (1990)
- Silver medal of the CNRS (1992)
- Servant Prize of the Academy of Sciences (1992)
- Junior member of the Institut universitaire de France (1992–1997)
- Ampère Prize (Grand Prize of the Academy of Sciences) (2003)
