= Bernard Boutet de Monvel =

French artist (1881–1949)

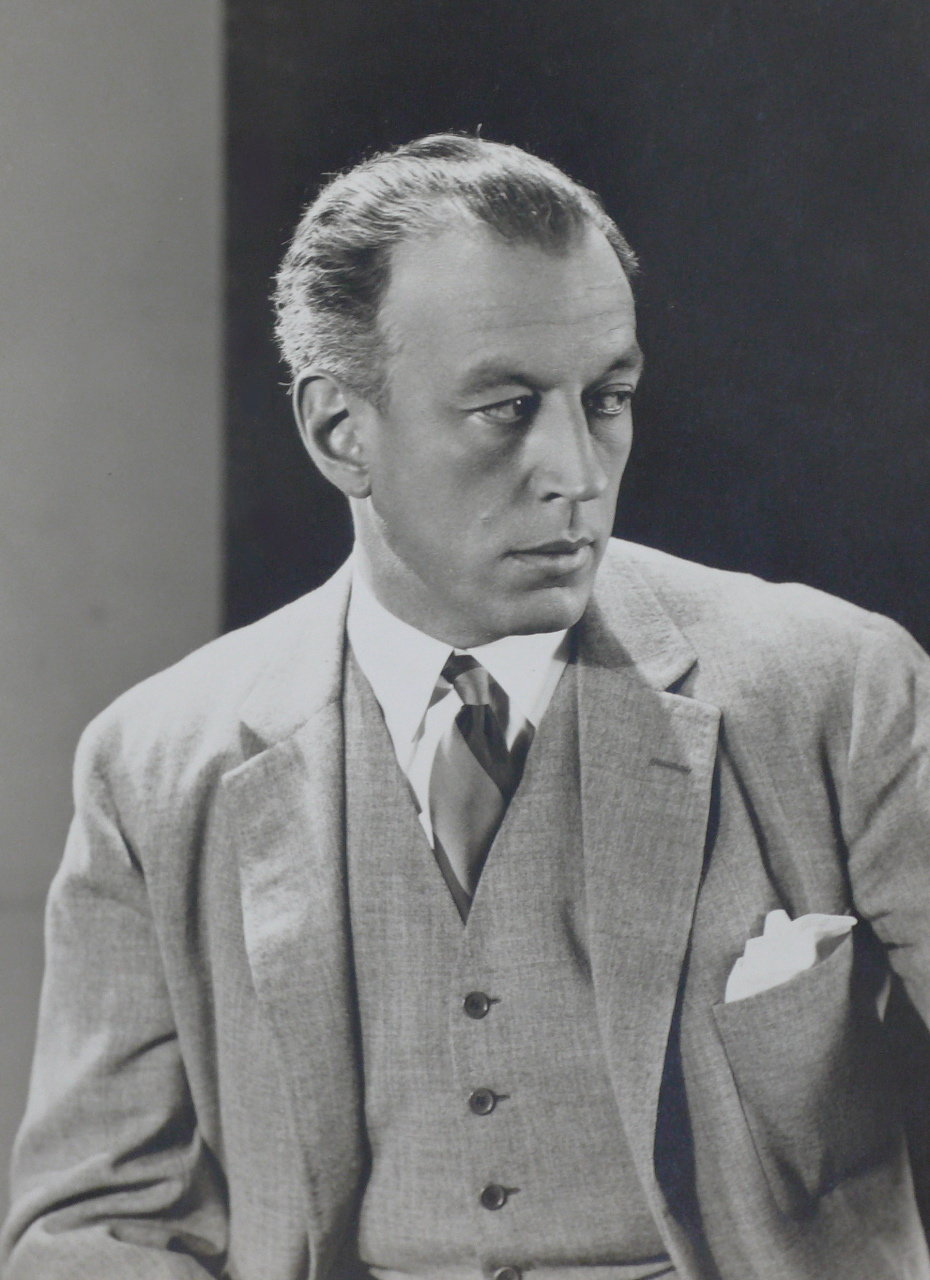
- Bernard Boutet de Monvel in 1926
- Born: Charles Louis André Bernard Boutet de Monvel; 9 August 1881; Paris, France
- Died: 28 October 1949 (aged 68); São Miguel, Açores, Portugal
- Known for: Painter, Illustrator, Decorator

Bernard Boutet de Monvel (9 August 1881 – 28 October 1949) was a French painter, sculptor, engraver, fashion illustrator and interior decorator. Although first known for his etchings, he earned notability for his paintings, especially his geometric paintings from the 1900s and his Moroccan paintings made during World War I. In both Europe and the United States, where he often traveled, he also became known as a portrait painter for high society clients.

== Early life and training ==
He was born in Paris's 4th district, the son of the painter and children's illustrator Louis-Maurice Boutet de Monvel. His brother Roger became a well-known writer. He was raised in both Paris and Nemours, and he set his sights on becoming a painter from the age of sixteen. Starting in 1897, he studied with Luc-Olivier Merson and Jean Dampt.

== Etchings ==
In 1898, he was introduced to etching by the American painter Louis McClellan Potter (1873–1912) and soon mastered the technique. Boutet de Monvel focused on colour etching using the 'au repérage' method, which required a separate plate for each colour. Some of his earliest etchings were of his brother Roger — L'habitué (The regular, 1902); L'homme aux chiens (Man with dogs, 1905) — and were stylistically reminiscent of James McNeill Whistler's work. He also made work celebrating as the citizens of Nemours and the riverbanks of the Loing; these include L'éclusière (The lock keeper, 1901); Les haleurs (The haulers, 1899); Le chaland (The lighter, 1899); and La péniche (The barge, 1899). The Studio devoted an article to these early works entitled "Coloured Etching in France" in 1901.

Following this, his etchings mainly revolved around dandies of the past. Examples include Le beau (The handsome, 1906); La merveilleuse (The marvellous, 1906); Le lion (The lion, 1907); and Les hortensias (The hydrangeas, 1911). He also took the countryside surrounding Nemours as a subject in works such as L'heure du repos (Hour of rest, 1908). In 1912, The Art Institute of Chicago devoted a retrospective to his colour prints.

== Paintings ==
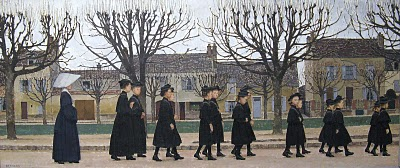
Le pensionnat de Nemours (1909) (Nemours' boarding school)

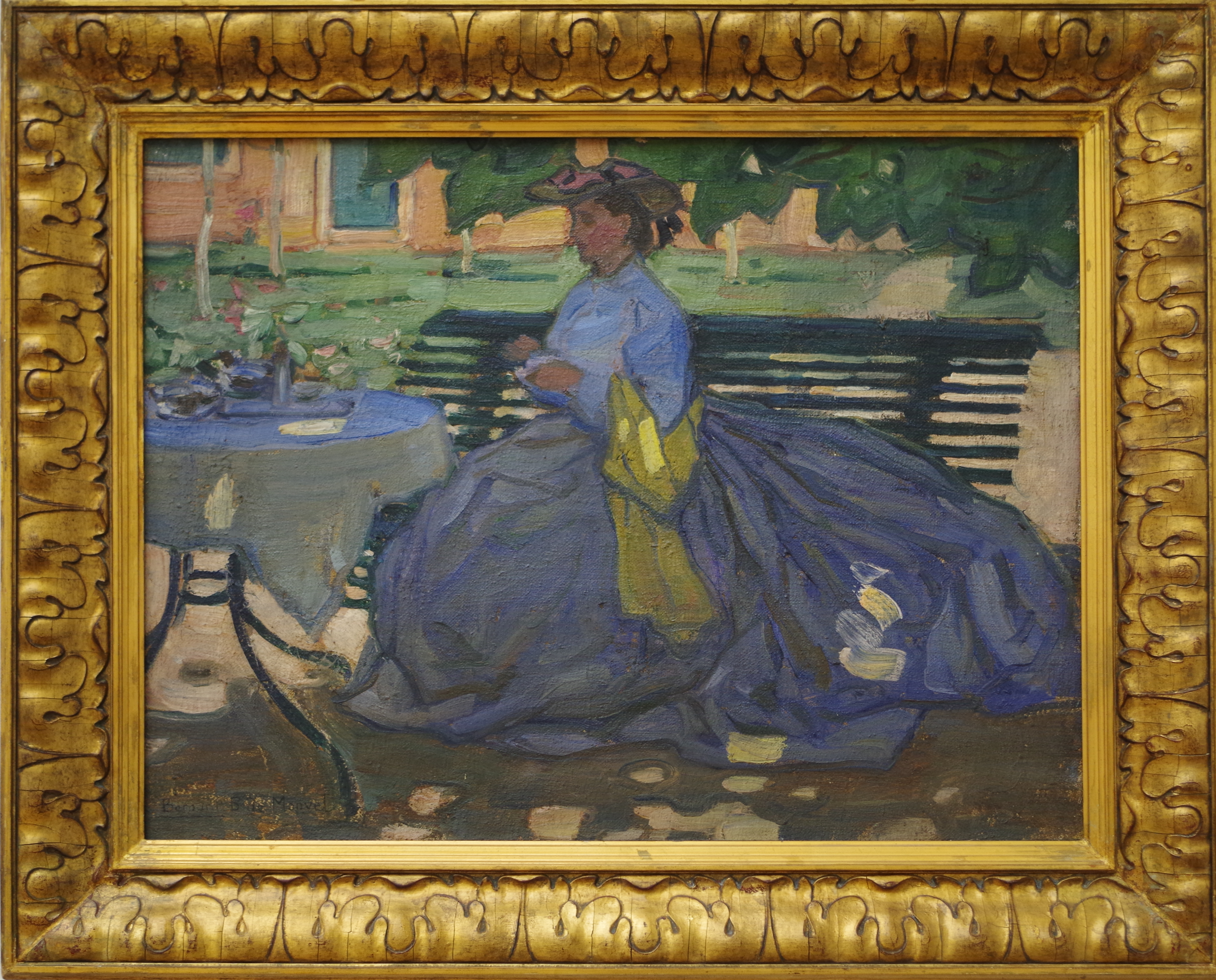
Femme à une table de jardin (1909) (Woman at a garden table)

Boutet de Monvel was simultaneously working in oil painting, especially portraits, which he began to exhibit at the Société Nationale des Beaux-Arts in 1903. He subsequently began sending works to the Salon d'Automne and the Salon des Indépendants as well. In 1907, he began to regularly send his works to exhibitions in the United States at the Carnegie Institute of Pittsburgh.

Early paintings like Les boucheries (Butcher's stalls, 1904) were starkly composed with bright pigments and strong blue shadows. In 1904, after a field trip to Florence, he suddenly shifted to a pointillist style. The light in the paintings became more vibrant and perspective disappeared. Examples of work in this style include Rita del Erido (1907) and Le Sophora (The Sophora tree, ca. 1907). His 1908 self-portrait entitled The Portrait, which showed him in the Nemours countryside on a stormy day flanked by two greyhounds, earned him critical recognition and nomination to membership in the Société Nationale des Beaux-Arts.

In 1909, Boutet de Monvel exhibited at Devambez Gallery a manifesto painting entitled Esquisse (Sketch, 1908), a portrait made using only a ruler and a pair of compasses. This geometric vision of a dandy drew critical censure and mockery of it as "rectilinear painting." Nonetheless, it laid the foundations for his signature style and helped to develop a path towards the later style known as Art Deco. Working with a refined geometric linearity, he reduced his palette to black and a few greys and earth tones handled as flat tints. He also tended to draw from a low perspective angle to accentuate the monumentality of his subjects. Works from this period include Comte Pierre de Quinsonas (1913); and MM. André Dunoyer de Segonzac and Jean-Louis Boussingault (1914).

== Illustrations ==
For financial reasons, Boutet de Monvel also contributed illustrations, especially fashion drawings, to magazines such as Fémina, Jardin des modes nouvelles, and Gazette du Bon Ton. Among those he worked closely with were the fashion designer Paul Poiret, who was an early admirer of his talent, and the illustrator Georges Barbier, who were cofounders of the Journal des Dames et des Modes. He was also associated with the Mortigny Circle, which included Pierre Brissaud, Lucien-Victor Guirand de Scevola, Pierre Troisgros, and others.

== First World War ==
When war broke out in 1914, Boutet de Monvel was called up as a reservist. He was injured during the Battle of the Marne. After a brief recovery he joined the 4th Bombardment Group as a bombardier. When the group disbanded in November 1915, he was appointed to the Orient Bombardment Group, based in Salonika, Macedonia. In June 1916, when this group disbanded in turn, he joined a new squadron, the C389. In September 1916, he and his pilot flew from Salonika to Bucharest, a feat that earned recognition in both France and Romania.

After several plane accidents, Boutet de Monvel left Macedonia in June 1917 with the Légion d'Honneur award and five commendations. He was transferred to Fez, where the 551st squadron was based, in October 1917. At the request of General Lyautey, who was the Resident-General of French Morocco, he began to paint again for the first time since war had been declared. Continuing in his rectilinear style, he painted the city of Fez and its inhabitants at all hours of the day. He also painted in Rabat and Marrakesh. In the year and a half before he was demobilized in March 1919, he created a singular and powerful vision of Morocco, whose austerity kept it far from orientalist cliché. His Moroccan paintings and his bas-reliefs, which Boutet de Monvel always considered his finest work, were exhibited in 1925 at the Henri Barbazanges gallery under the patronage of Marshal Lyautey. The introductory text to the catalogue, written by Jérôme and Jean Tharaud, ended with these words: “(In Morocco) Boutet de Monvel set down on paper the appearance of a day and forever, just at the point where this profound element is at risk of disappearing”.

During the war, he undertook the creation of an album, Les mois de la guerre (The war months, 1914–1918) that remains unpublished.

== Inter-war years ==
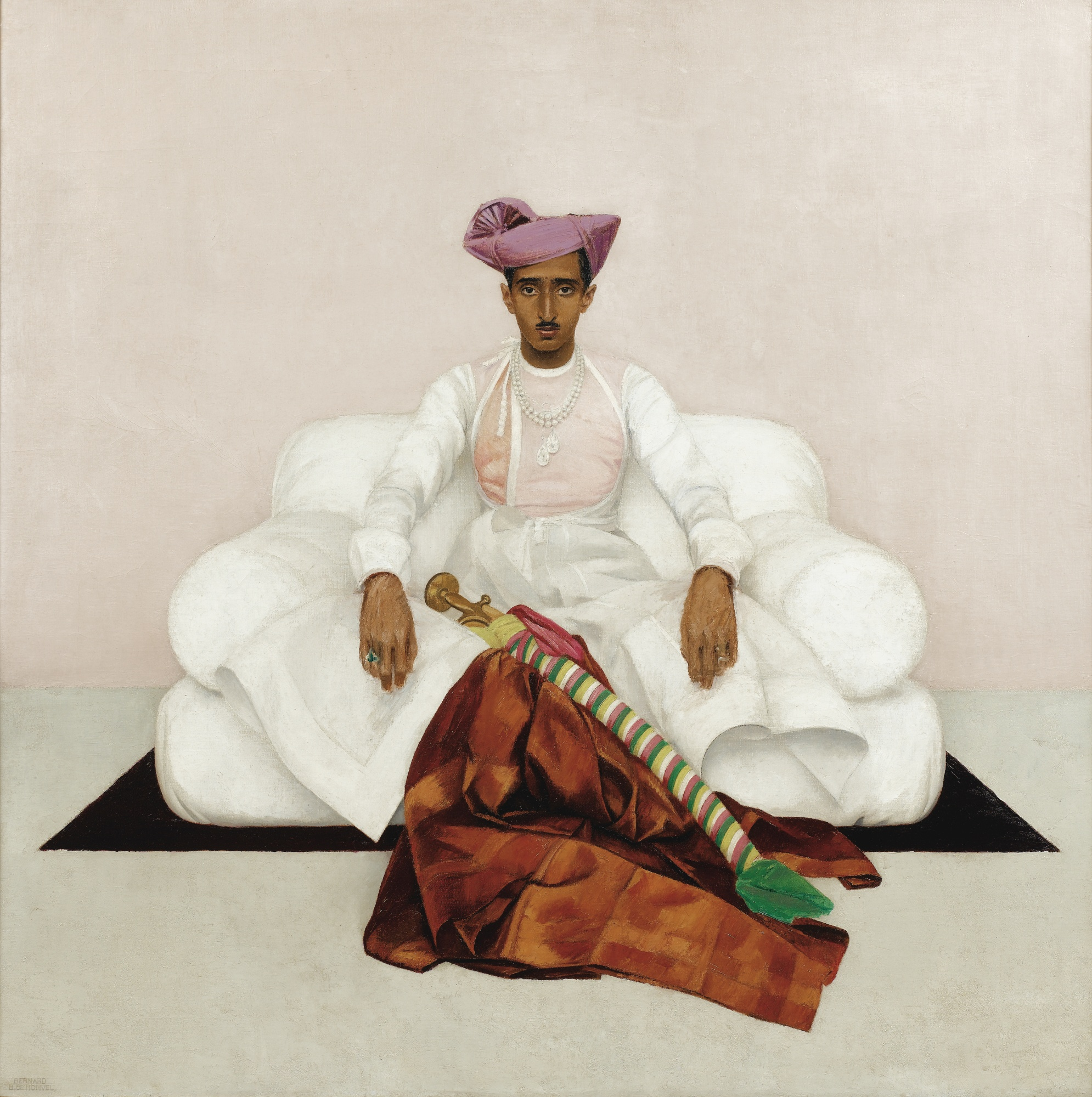
H.H. The Maharajah of Indore (1934)

When Boutet de Monvel returned to Paris, he took up his career as a painter again, especially as a portraitist of sportsmen and dandies. Works from this period include Portrait du Prince Sixte de Bourbon-Parme (Portrait of the Sixth Prince of Bourbon-Parma, 1921) and Portrait de Georges-Marie Haardt (Portrait of Georges-Marie Haardt, 1924). He also took up his collaboration with the Gazette du Bon Ton again, as well as with several fashion magazines, including Vogue. In 1926 he entered into an exclusivity agreement with Harper's Bazaar that lasted until 1933.

Books he illustrated included Général Bramble by André Maurois (1920) and La première traversée du Sahara (First crossing of the Sahara) by Georges Marie-Haardt and Louis Haudouin-Dubreuil (1924).

Finally, at Louis Süe's behest, he joined the design firm La Compagnie des Arts Français on its creation in 1919. Interior designs he participated in included Jean Patou's Parisian hotel (1923), actress Jane Renouardt's villa in Saint Cloud (1924–1925); and Mrs. Edeline Jacques' Biarritz dining room (1925).

A 1926 retrospective of his work at Anderson Gallery in New York was followed in 1927 by an exhibition of his paintings at the Baltimore Museum of Art. His first trips to the United States were made for these shows, and from then on, becoming very much in demand by American café society for his talents as a portraitist. His sitters included Henry Clay Frick, Payne Whitney, and members of the du Pont, Astor, and Vanderbilt families.

In 1929 he painted a series of New York cityscapes through which he endeavoured to capture the dehumanised modernity of a city under construction via a mixture of abstraction and photographic realism. Together with some similar views of a Chicago steelworks in 1928, these paintings bear comparison with work by major figures of the Precisionist movement such as Charles Sheeler.

In the 1930s, his portraits of the international elite included the Maharajah Yashwant Rao Holkar II and Maharani Sanyogita Devi of Indore in court dress (1934), Lady Charles Mendl (1936), and the Marquis de Cuevas (1938).

== Final years ==
Back in Paris when the Second World War was declared, he opted not to leave France, and his main work during the war involved a series on secondhand booksellers along the quays of the Seine.

In 1947, the Knoedler Gallery mounted a retrospective of his work. Boutet de Monvel got back into the habit of travelling to the United States to paint portraits like that of Millicent Rogers (1949). During one of these trips between Paris and New York in 1949, he was killed when his plane crashed on Sao Miguel Island in the Azores.

== Exhibitions and annual shows ==
=== Annual shows ===
- Société Nationale de Beaux-Arts: 1903–08, 1921.
- Salon d'Automne: 1905–07, 1909, 1920–22.
- Salon des Indépendants: 1905–06, and 1918.
- Société Moderne: 1910.
- Salon de la Société des Dessinateurs Humoristiques: 1911.
- Carnegie Institute at Pittsburgh (Pennsylvania): 1907–08, 1912–13, 1922–25, 1929, 1933–37, 1939–41, 1943–49.

=== Exhibitions ===
- 1908: Cinquante gravures en couleurs de Bernard Boutet de Monvel (Fifty colour etchings by Bernard Boutet de Monvel) – Devambez Gallery in Paris.
- 1909: Peintures, aquarelles et gravures par Bernard Boutet de Monvel, Jacques Brissaud, Pierre Brissaud, Maurice Tacquoy, sculptures par Philippe Besnard (Paintings, watercolours and etchings by Bernard Boutet de Monvel, Jacques Brissaud, Pierre Brissaud and Maurice Tacquoy, sculptures by Philippe Besnard) – Devambez Gallery in Paris.
- 1909: April Ausstellung – Die galerie Eduard Schulte in Berlin.
- 1911: Works by Bernard Boutet de Monvel, Georges Lepape, Jacques and Pierre Brissaud – Henri Barbazanges Gallery.
- 1913: Colour Etchings by Bernard Boutet de Monvel – Leicester Galleries in London.
- 1914: Exposition des collaborateurs de la Gazette du Bon Ton (Exhibition of contributors to the Gazette du Bon Ton magazine) – Levesque Gallery in Paris.
- 1915: The Panama Pacific International Exposition – San Francisco (California).
- 1918: Exposition "France – Maroc" (France – Morocco) – Excelsior Hotel in Casablanca.
- 1921: Exhibition by Pierre Brissaud and Bernard Boutet de Monvel – Belmaison Gallery in New York.
- 1924: Exposition de l'Association des peintres et sculpteurs du Maroc (Exhibition by the Morocco painters and sculptors Association) – Georges Petit Gallery in Paris.
- 1925: Morocco, Peintures et bas-reliefs de Bernard Boutet de Monvel (Paintings and bas-reliefs by Bernard Boutet de Monvel) – Henri Bargazanges Gallery in Paris.
- 1926: Société des Artistes Indépendants – Grand Palais in Paris.
- 1926: The Art of Bernard Boutet de Monvel – Anderson Gallery in New York.
- 1927: Exhibition of colour etchings by Bernard Boutet de Monvel – C. W. Kraushaar Galleries in New York.
- 1927: Exhibition of paintings, bas-reliefs and decorations by Bernard Boutet de Monvel – The Arts Club of Chicago (Illinois).
- 1932: Paintings by Bernard Boutet de Monvel – C. W. Kraushaar Galleries in New York.
- 1932: Bernard Boutet de Monvel – Reinhardt Gallery in New York.
- 1933–1934: A century of progress – Chicago World Fair (Illinois).
- 1934: Portraits by Bernard Boutet de Monvel – Wildenstein Gallery in New York.
- 1937: Bernard Boutet de Monvel – The Society of the Four Arts in Palm Beach (Florida).
- 1944–1945: Paris et ses peintres (Paris and its painters) – Galerie Charpentier in Paris.
- 1947: Profils Bernard Boutet de Monvel (Bernard Boutet de Monvel's Profiles) – Knoedler Gallery in New York.

=== Posthumous ===
- 1951: Retrospective Bernard Boutet de Monvel – Palais Galliera Museum in Paris.
- 1952: Portraits of Personalities – Portraits Inc in New York.
- 1975: Bernard Boutet de Monvel – Galerie du Luxembourg in Paris.
- 1976–1977: Cinquantenaire de l'exposition de 1925 (Fiftieth anniversary of the 1925 exhibition)- Musée des Arts Décoratifs in Paris.
- 1977: Tendenzen der Zwanziger Jahre – Neuen Nationalgalerie de Charlottenburg, Berlin (Germany).
- 1984: Images et imaginaires d'Architecture (Images and the imagination of Architecture) – Centre National d'Art et de Culture Georges Pompidou in Paris.
- 1987: Costumes of Royal India - The Metropolitan Museum of Art in New York.
- 1991: The 1920s Age of Metropolis – The Museum of Fine Art in Montreal.
- 1993: Bernard Boutet de Monvel – Verneuil-Saints-Pères Gallery in Paris.
- 1994–1995: Bernard Boutet de Monvel – Barry Friedman Ltd Gallery in New York.
- 1999: Maroc, les trésors du royaume – Petit palais à Paris
- 2001: Retrospective Bernard Boutet de Monvel – Mona Bismarck Foundation in Paris.
- 2001: Bernard Boutet de Monvel Décorateur (Interior decorator Bernard Boutet de Monvel) – Galerie du Passage in Paris.

== See also ==
- Boutet de Monvel
- Louis-Maurice Boutet de Monvel

== See also ==
- List of Orientalist artists
- Orientalism
