= Roger Boutet de Monvel =

French writer

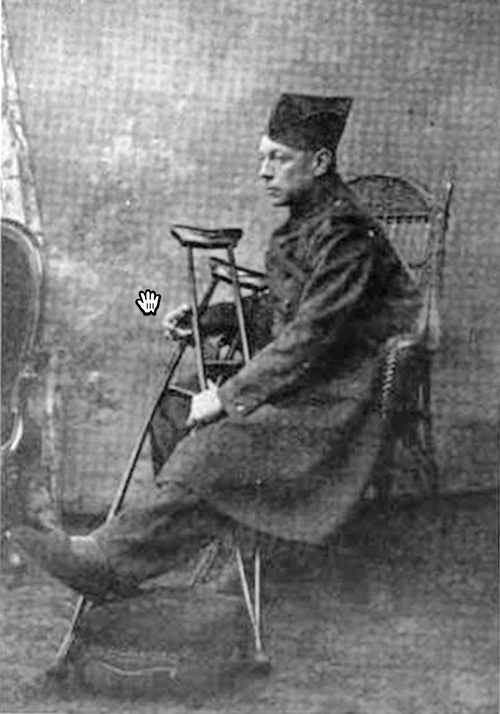
- Roger Boutet de Monvel recuperating from injuries received in the trenches of World War I, late 1915
- Born: 4 December 1879; Paris (France)
- Died: 25 December 1951 (aged 72); Paris (France)
- Occupation: Writer

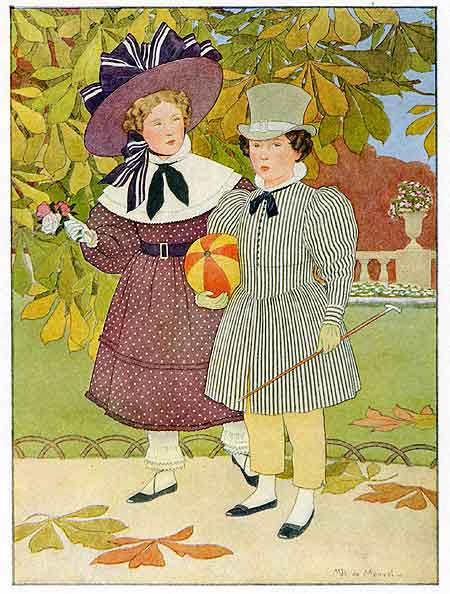
Drawing by Maurice Boutet de Monvel for Roger Boutet de Monvel's 1904 article "Children's Costumes in the Nineteenth Century".

Roger Boutet de Monvel (4 December 1879 – 25 December 1951) was a French writer of historical studies and magazine articles on fashion and other topics.

== Biography ==
Born in the 4th arrondissement of Paris, Roger Boutet de Monvel was the oldest son of Maurice Boutet de Monvel (1850–1913), a painter and illustrator of children's books. His brother was Bernard was also an artist. He was raised in Paris and in Nemours, where his maternal grandparents owned a house. He often served as a model for his father; for example, his silhouette appears in his father's illustrations for Anatole France's Nos enfants, which also has an entire chapter about him.

After he finished his education, Boutet de Monvel took a position as secretary to the director of the Imprimerie nationale. He began publishing articles in the early 1900s, at first usually in collaboration with his father or brother. His first major work, a historical study entitled Les variétés (The Variety Shows), was published in 1905 by Plon, which would remain his publisher for most of his career. Later historical studies took as their themes the upper social classes of France, the life of St. Francis of Assisi, and the writers Lord Byron and Miguel de Cervantes.

In 1911, he took a job at the Carnavalet Museum in conservation.

He joined the armed forces during the First World War but was discharged early on due to a leg injury. Beginning in 1917, he published several books with war-related themes, including Carnet d'un permissionnaire (Notebook from a Soldier on Leave, 1917), Le bon anglais (The Good Englishman, 1918) and Nos frères d'Amériques (Our American Brothers, 1918).

Something of a dandy, Boutet de Monvel was engaged with the fashion industry in various ways. In 1912, he began writing for the Gazette du Bon Ton, a leading fashion magazine of the day, and shortly became a regular contributor. In 1915 he attended the Panama–Pacific International Exposition in San Francisco as a representative from the French fashion industry. The following year, he wrote promotional copy for designer Paul Poiret. After the war, he returned to writing about fashion in Gazette du Bon Ton as well as in magazines like Vogue, Harper's Bazaar, and Monsieur.

He died in the 8th arrondissement of Paris on Christmas Day 1951. He left a set of unpublished memoirs that he had been working on since the late 1930s.

== Works ==
- "Children's Costumes in the Nineteenth Century", Century Magazine, 1904; with illustrations by Maurice Boutet de Monvel
- Les Variétés (The Variety Shows), 1905
- Georges Brummel and Georges IV, 1906. Translated as: Beau Brummel and His Times, 1908
- Les anglais à Paris, 1911. Translated as: Eminent English Men & Women in Paris, 1912
- Carnet d'un permissionnaire (Notebook from a Soldier on Leave), 1917
- Le bon anglais (The Good Englishman), 1918
- Nos frères d'Amériques (Our American Brothers), 1918
- Grands seigneurs et bourgeois d'Angleterre (The Great Lords and Bourgeoisie of England), Plon Publishers, 1918
- Une vie de Saint François d'Assise (Life of Saint Francis of Assisi), 1921; with illustrations by Maurice Boutet de Monvel
- La vie de Lord Byron (Life of Lord Byron), 1924
- La vie martial du Bailli de Suffren (The Martial Life of Bailli de Suffren), 1929
- Cerventès et les enchanteurs, 1933. Translated as: Cervantes and the Magicians, 1934
- Pérou et Chile (Peru and Chile), 1937
