= Monvel, Gujarat =

Human settlement in India

Monvel is a town and former princely state on Saurashtra peninsula, in Gujarat, western India.

== History ==
Monvel was a minor princely state, also comprising two more villages, in the Halar prant of Kathiawar. It was ruled by Kathi Chieftains.

It had a combined population of 1,967 in 1901, yielding a state revenue of 18,299 Rupees (1903–4, nearly all from land) and paying a tribute of 313 Rupees, to the Gaekwar Baroda State.

== External links and Sources ==
History

- Imperial Gazetteer, on dsal.uchicago.edu
