= Anne Boutet de Monvel =

French applied mathematician and mathematical physicist

Anne-Marie Boutet de Monvel (née Berthier, born 1948, also published as Anne-Marie Berthier and Anne-Marie Boutet de Monvel-Berthier) is a French applied mathematician and mathematical physicist, and a professor emerita in the University of Paris, affiliated with the Institut de mathématiques de Jussieu – Paris Rive Gauche.

== Books ==
Boutet de Monvel is the author of Spectral theory and wave operators for the Schrödinger equation (Pitman, 1982). With Werner Amrein and Vladimir Georgescu she is the co-author of Hardy type inequalities for abstract differential operators (American Mathematical Society, 1987) and $C_0$-groups, commutator methods and spectral theory of $N$-body Hamiltonians (Birkhäuser, 1996).

For many years she was co-editor-in-chief of the book series Progress in Mathematical Physics, following its relaunch by Birkhäuser in 1999.

== Recognition ==
She was named a Fellow of the American Mathematical Society, in the 2022 class of fellows, "for contributions to mathematical physics, particularly Schroedinger operator theory, and to the theory of integrable systems".

== Personal life ==
Boutet de Monvel was married to Louis Boutet de Monvel (1941–2014), also a mathematician.
