= Louis-Maurice Boutet de Monvel =

French painter and illustrator (1850–1913)

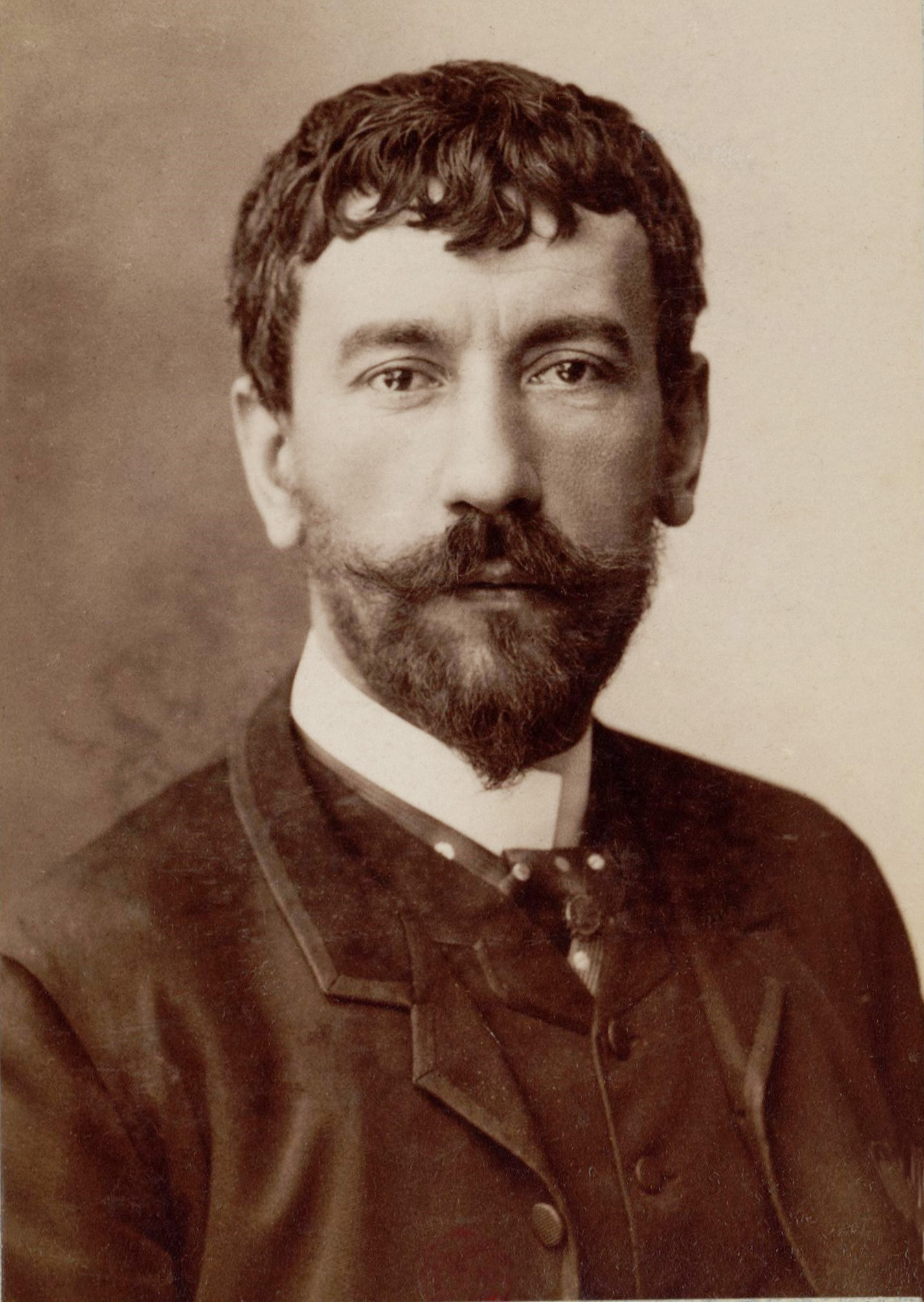
- Born: Louis-Maurice Boutet de Monvel; 18 October 1850; Orléans, France
- Died: 16 March 1913 (aged 62); Paris, France
- Education: Julian Academy
- Occupations: painter and illustrator
- Spouse: Jeanne Lebaigue
- Children: Roger, Bernard
- Writing career
- Genres: watercolors, illustrations for children's books
- Notable work: Joan of Arc (1895)
- Notable awards: Paris Salon, bronze medal (1878); silver medal (1880)

Louis-Maurice Boutet de Monvel (18 October 1850 – 16 March 1913) was a French painter and illustrator best known for his watercolours for children's books. He was a major figure in nineteenth-century children's book illustration.

== Early life and education ==
Boutet de Monvel was born in Orléans, the second of nine children; his father, Benjamin Boutet de Monvel (1820–1880), was a physics and chemistry professor. His maternal grandfather was the tenor Adolphe Nourrit (1802–1839), and there were other artists in the family. He lived mainly in Paris as a child.

He began attending the École nationale supérieure des Beaux-Arts in early 1870. During the Franco-Prussian War, he served in the French army. With the return of peace, he began attending the Académie Julian, where he worked with Gustave Boulanger and Jules Lefèbvre, both major influences on his early work. He also worked with Carolus-Duran.

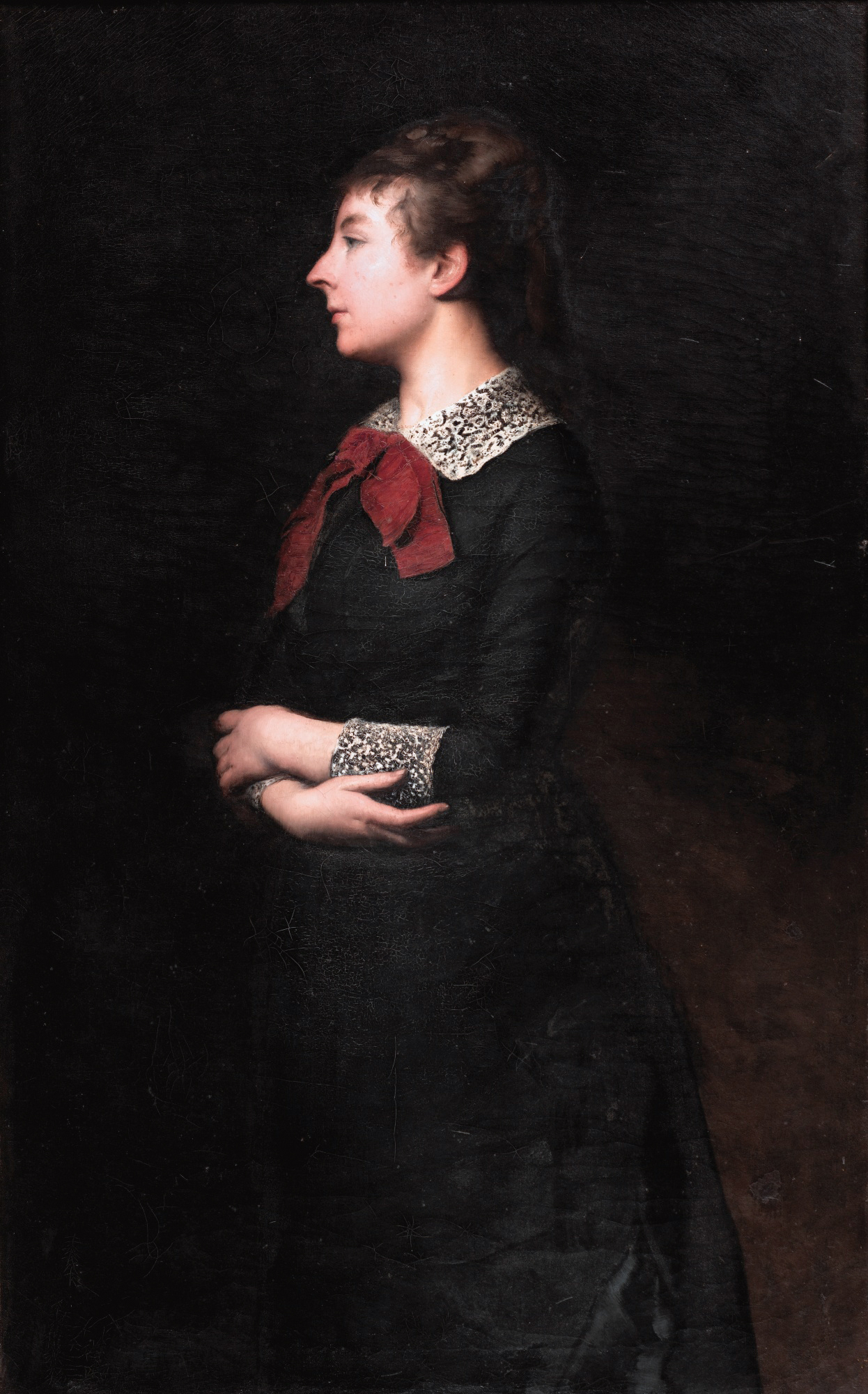
Jeanne Lebaigue, oil on canvas,1877–1878

== Paintings ==
In 1873 he exhibited for the first time at the Salon, showing a painting entitled Temptation. He won a bronze medal in 1878 for The Good Samaritan and a silver medal in 1880 for The Lesson Before the Sabbath.

Three trips to Algeria (1876, 1878, 1880) had a strong influence on his style as he responded to the quality of the light. He became a plein air painter and his palette shifted towards orange and blue as its base colors. In the Paris salon of 1880, he showed one of his Algerian paintings, On the High Plateaus.

In 1885, he exhibited The Rabble's Apotheosis, or the Triumph of Robert Macaire at an exhibition organized by the Society of French Artists. However, the painting's royalist theme so angered Edmond Turquet, then the Deputy Secretary of State for Fine Art, that it was removed just before the private viewing and moved to the premises of the newspaper Le Figaro.

He was an early member of the Society of French Watercolourists, which had recently been founded by Édouard Detaille. One of the first watercolours he sent to their exhibition was a portrait of a young woman in Renaissance clothing; its great success opened the door for a career as a portrait painter. His skill at capturing the moods of children gained him many commissions from upper middle class parents. He received so many commissions for portraits that at one time he contemplated giving up book illustration (see below).

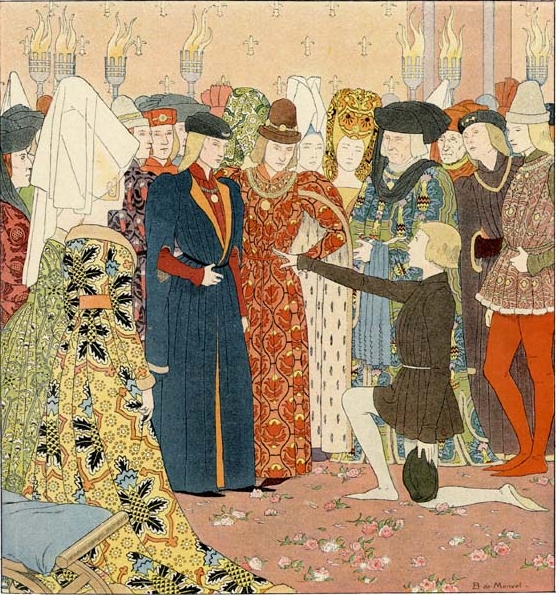
Illustration from Jeanne d'Arc (1896)

== Illustrations ==
In 1876, he married Jeanne Labaigue of Orléans, and their first child was born three years later. Their son Roger would become a writer, and their son Bernard would become a painter. The need to support his family pushed him into commercial illustration. In 1881, he illustrated a children's reader, and this opened further commissions to illustrate children's books. He also began contributing illustrations to the children's magazine St. Nicholas, continuing until 1890.

In 1895 he published an illustrated children's history of Joan of Arc that has been regarded as his masterpiece. The epic scenes for Joan of Arc show the influence of two late-medieval painters: Fra Angelico in the use of modeling and Paolo Uccello in the composition of battle scenes. Drawn with a strong line and clear, harmonious colors, his illustrations drew critical praise even though he himself was disappointed in the quality of the reproductions, which had been done by zincotype, a then-new photoengraving process. As one critic put it:

Boutet de Monvel's full-page illustrations have a nobility and grandeur akin to the great church frescoes of the Renaissance. Their pleasingly flat rendering combined with a sophisticated use of design elements...owe a debt to the Japanese prints so popular in the artist's day.

Joan of Arc was a huge success and brought him international recognition. In 1899, he participated in an exhibition organized by members of the Viennese Secession that focused on graphic art. That same year his work was shown in the United States at venues such as the Art Institute of Chicago, the Museum of Fine Arts, Boston, and the Pennsylvania Academy of the Fine Arts in Philadelphia. He went to Chicago for that exhibition but fell ill with a recurrence of a bronchial ailment contracted during the Franco-Prussian war.

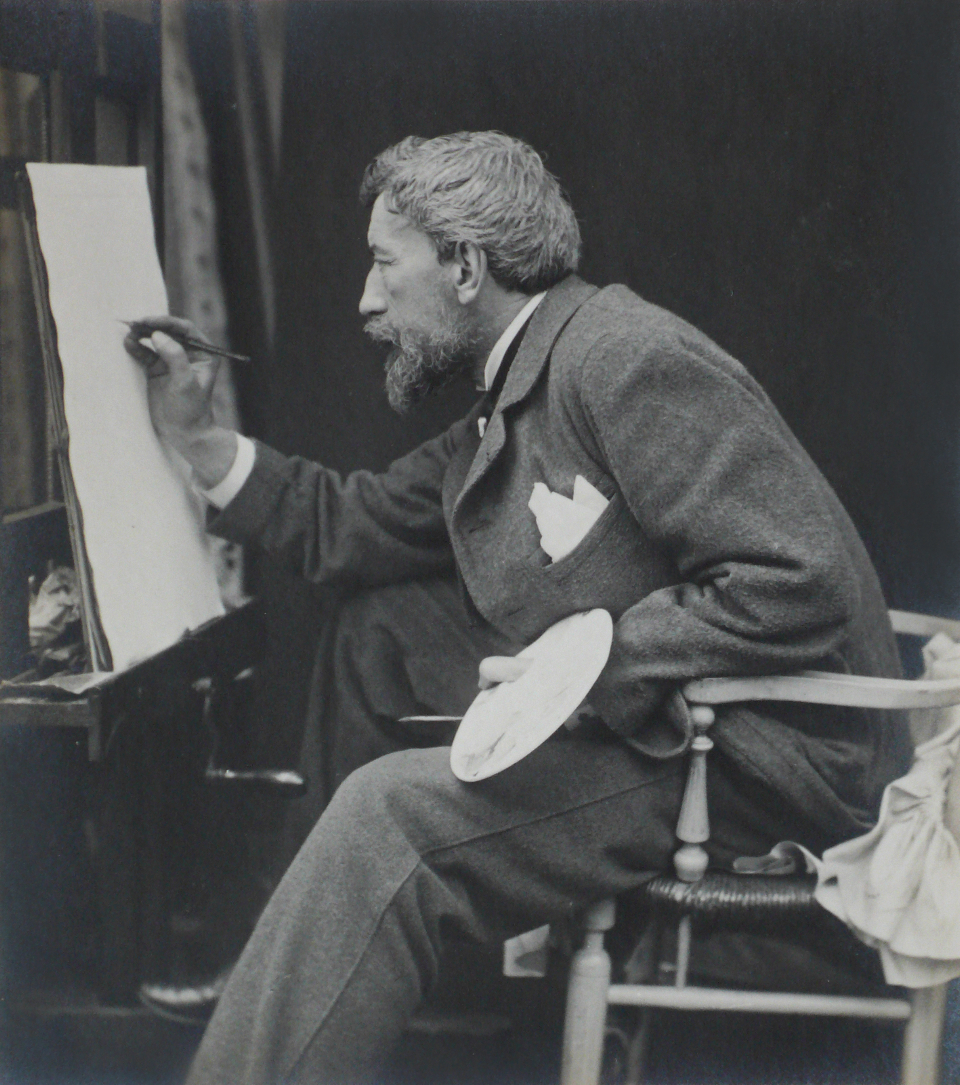
Boutet de Monvel at work

At the World's Fair of 1900, he received a gold medal for a panel entitled Joan at the Court of Chinon that was part of a commission for a new basilica in Donrémy. It was one of a set of five panels, but the other four were never finished, though a smaller-scale version was completed for senator William A. Clark, who donated it to the Corcoran Gallery of Art in Washington.

He died in Nemours in 1913. Not long afterwards, the Manzi et Joyant Gallery organised a retrospective of his work in Paris. Further retrospectives have followed, and a large traveling show was organized in the United States in 1987-88. Some of his work is held by museums.

Boutet de Monvel is still considered a master of the children's illustration genre for the originality of his work. His style has been praised for its lack of unnecessary detail, and it has been noted that his images provide "a revelation of a subject which the writer has treated only in a fragmentary and superficial manner." He has been ranked alongside Kate Greenaway and Randolph Caldecott as a leading figure of the 19th century's golden era of children's book illustration.

=== Selected books illustrated by de Monvel ===
- Vielles chansons et rondes pour les petits enfants (Old Songs and Rounds for Little Children, 1883)
- Chansons de France pour les petits français (Songs of France for French Children 1884)
- Quand j'étais petit by Lucien Briart (When I Was Young, 1886)
- La Farce de maître Pathelin (The Farce of Master Pathelin, 1887)
- Nos enfants, scènes de la ville et des champs by Anatole France (Our Children: Scenes from the Country and the Town, 1887)
- Fables de La Fontaine (Fables of La Fontaine, 1888)
- Xavière by Ferdinand Fabre (1890)
- Jeanne d'Arc (Joan of Arc, 1895)

== In popular culture ==
Boutet de Monvel was a mentor of the Dutch illustrator Henriette Willebeek le Mair, who studied with him informally over a number of years.

In A Moveable Feast, Ernest Hemingway mentions Boutet de Monvel's Joan of Arc Illustrations, likening Alice B. Toklas' hair to that of Joan of Arc's hair.

== Gallery ==
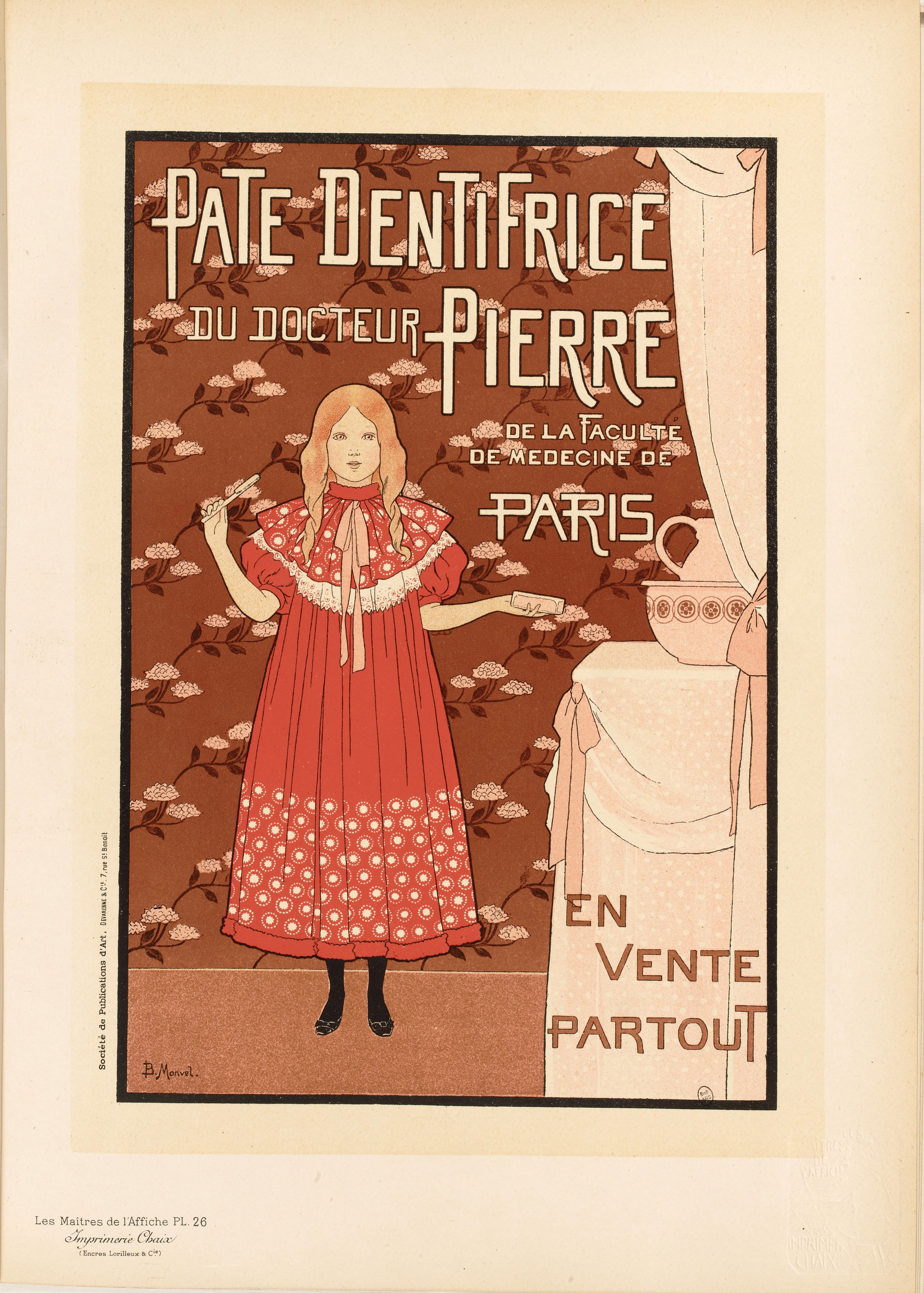
Poster for a toothpaste, published in Les Maîtres de l'Affiche

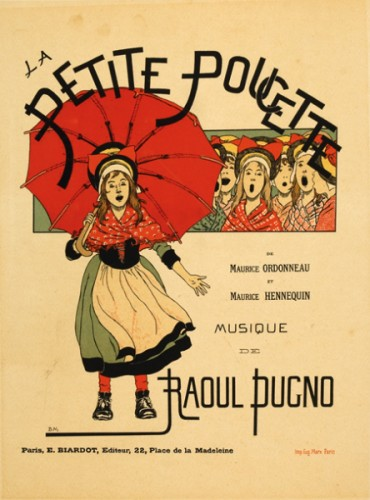
Poster for the operetta La Petite Poucette, c. 1891

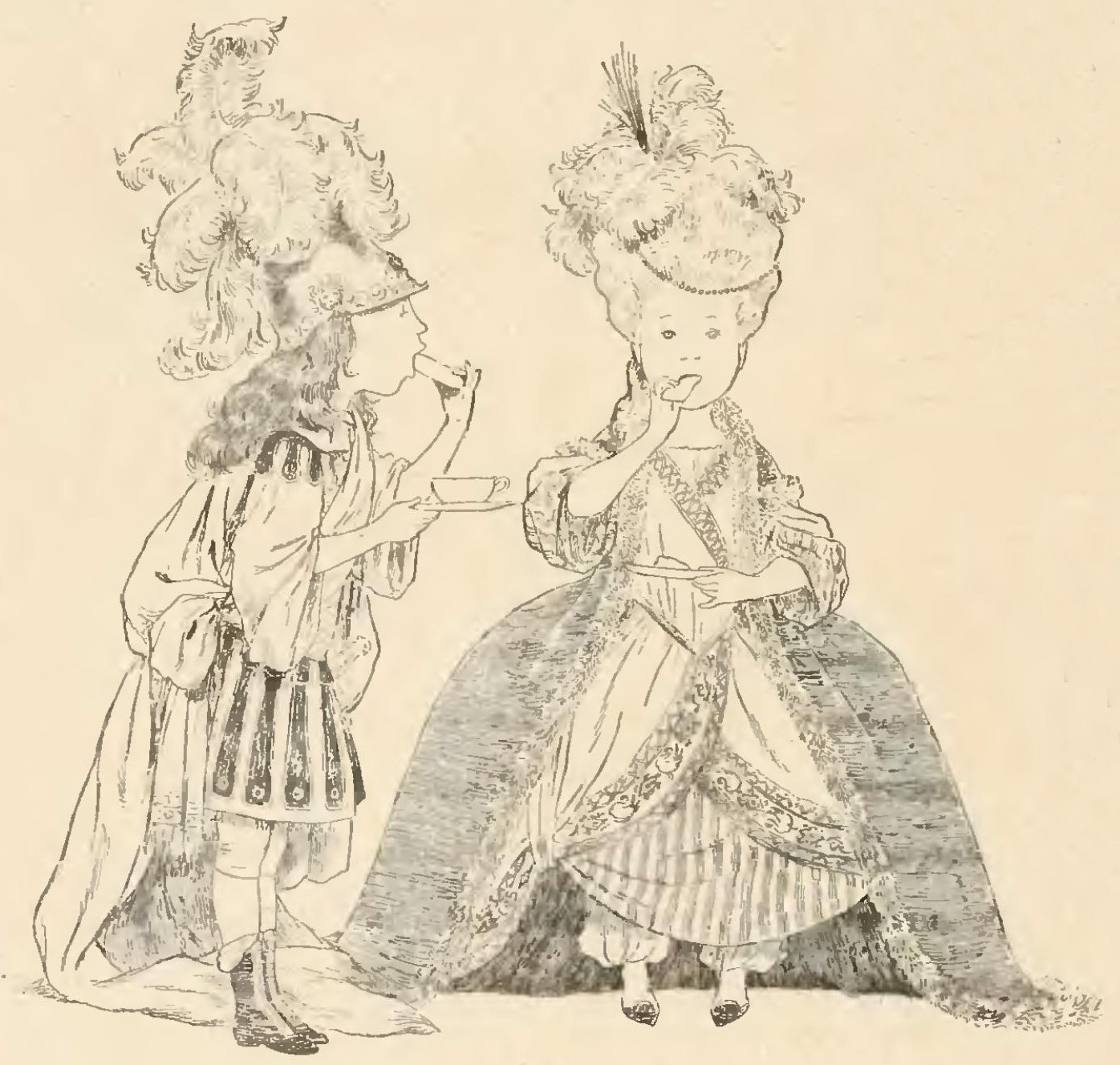
Drawing for Nos enfants (1887)

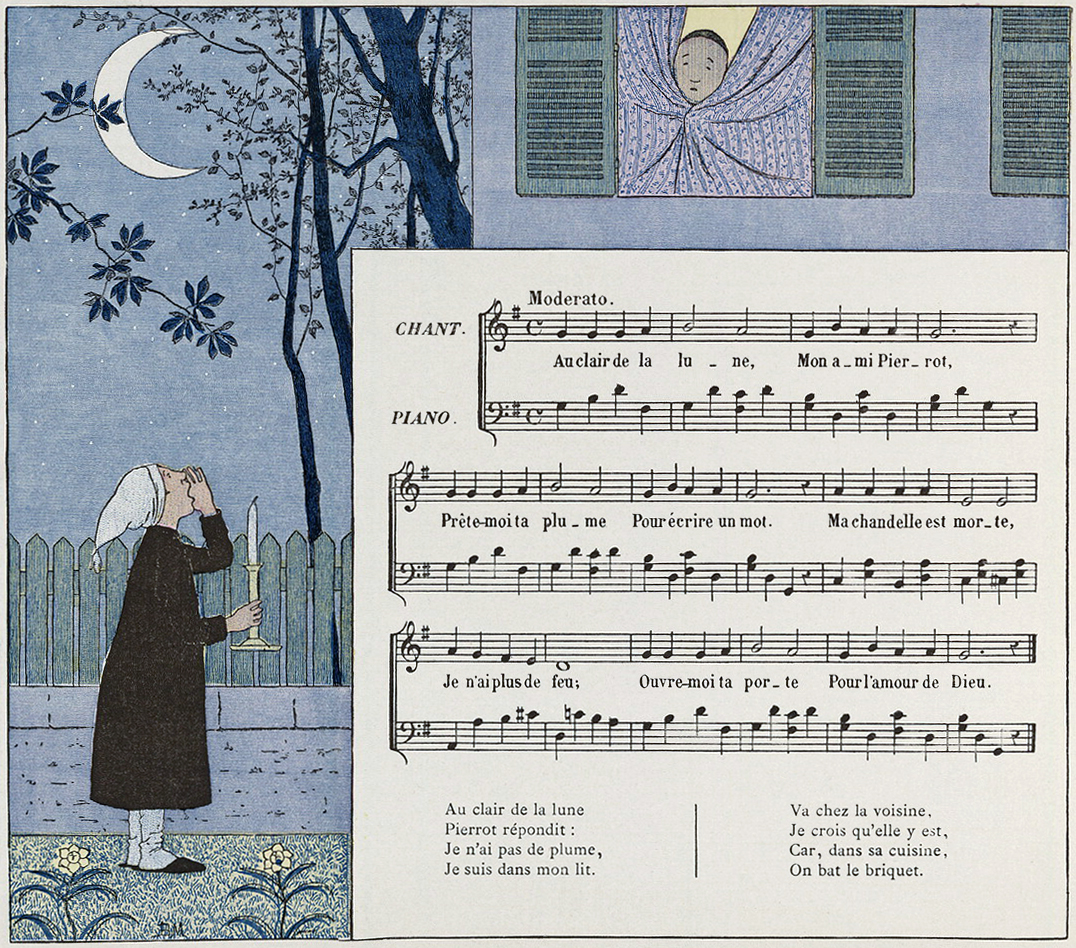
Illustration for the song "Au Clair de la Lune" (1883)

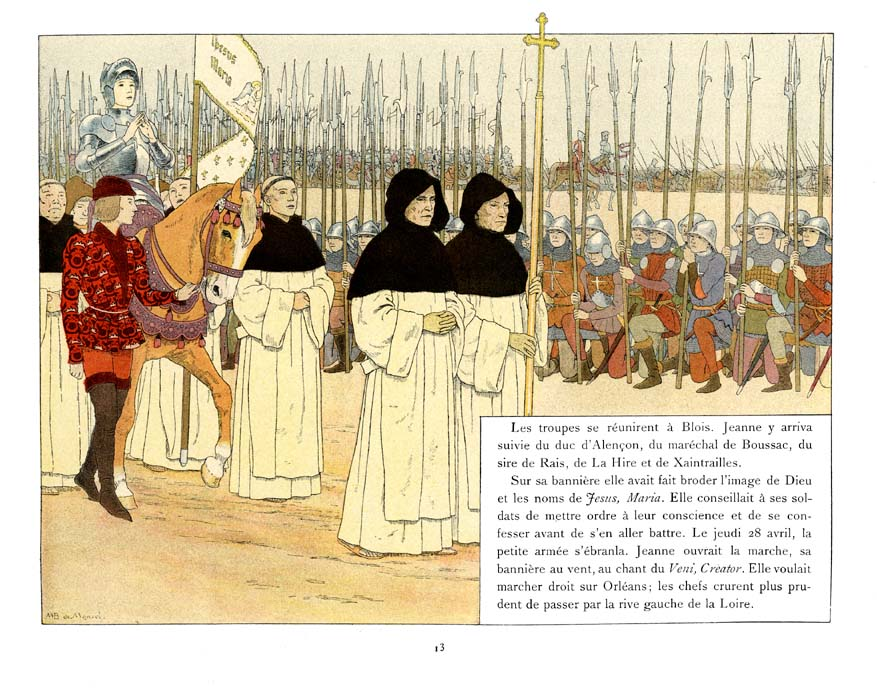
Double-page spread from Jeanne D'Arc (1895)

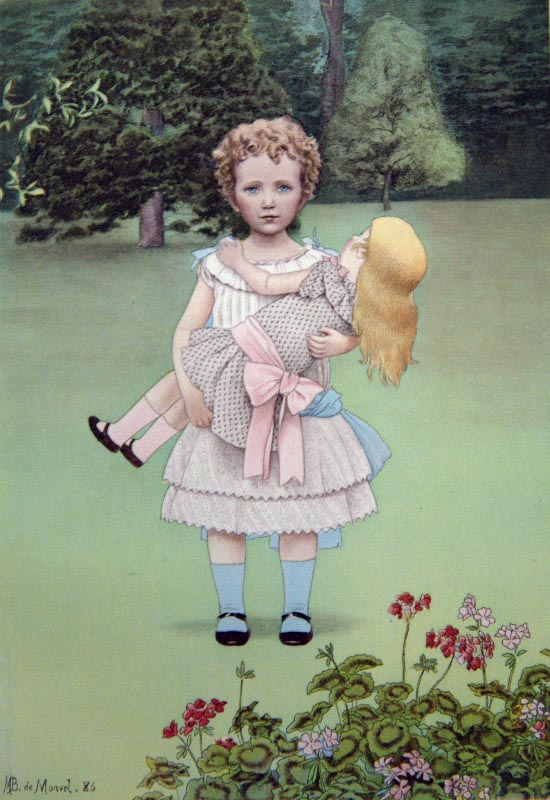
A commissioned child's portrait (1887)

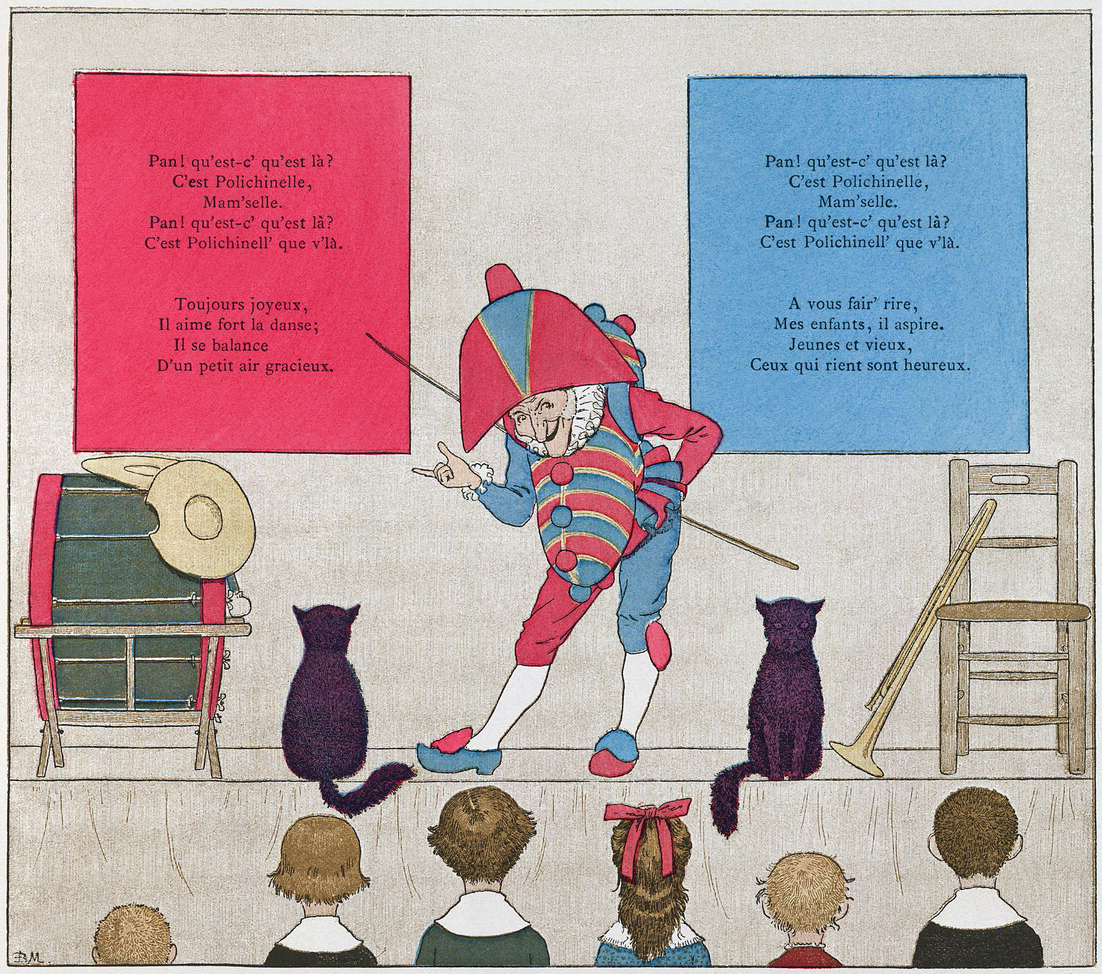
Page from Vielles Chansons et Rondes (1883)

=== Jeanne D'Arc series (1895-1913) ===
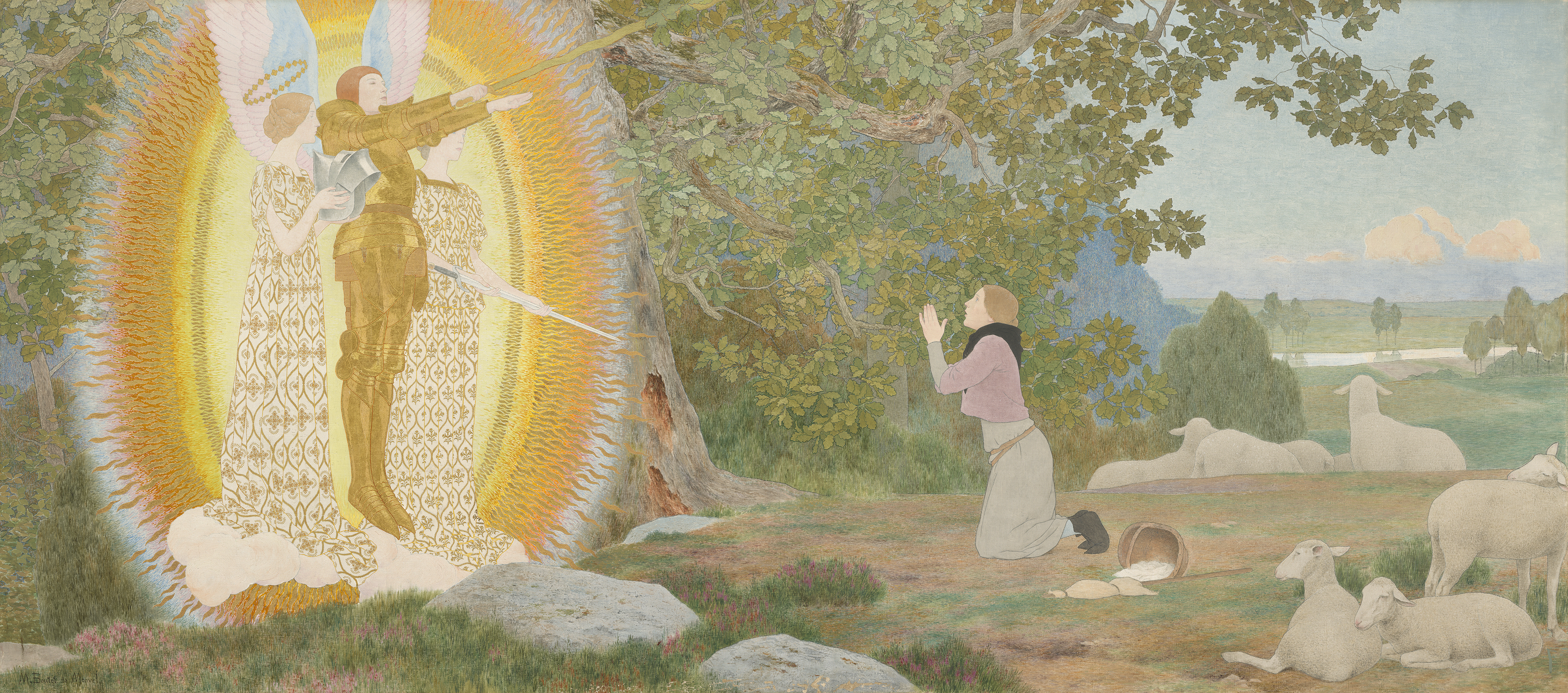
La vision et l'inspiration from Jeanne D'Arc (1895)

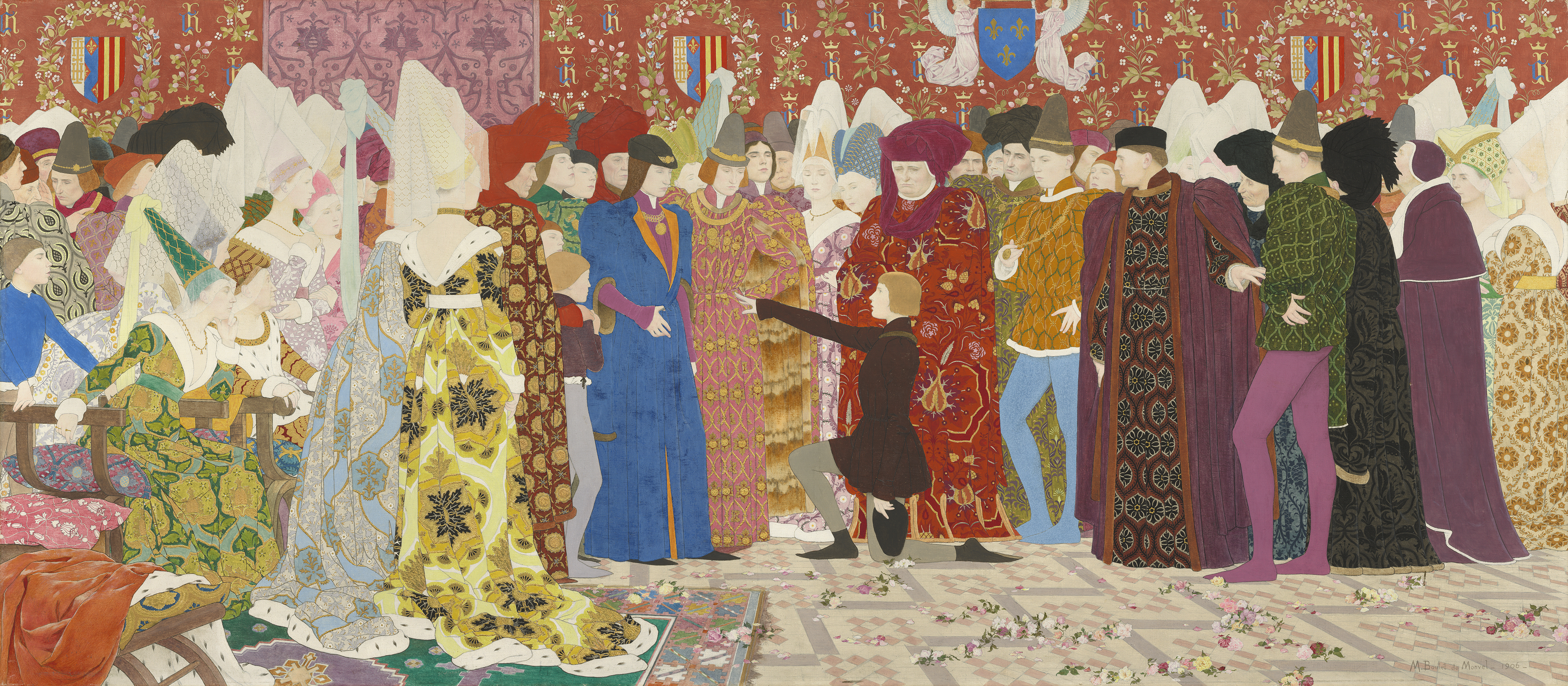
Her Appeal to the Dauphin from Jeanne D'Arc (1906)

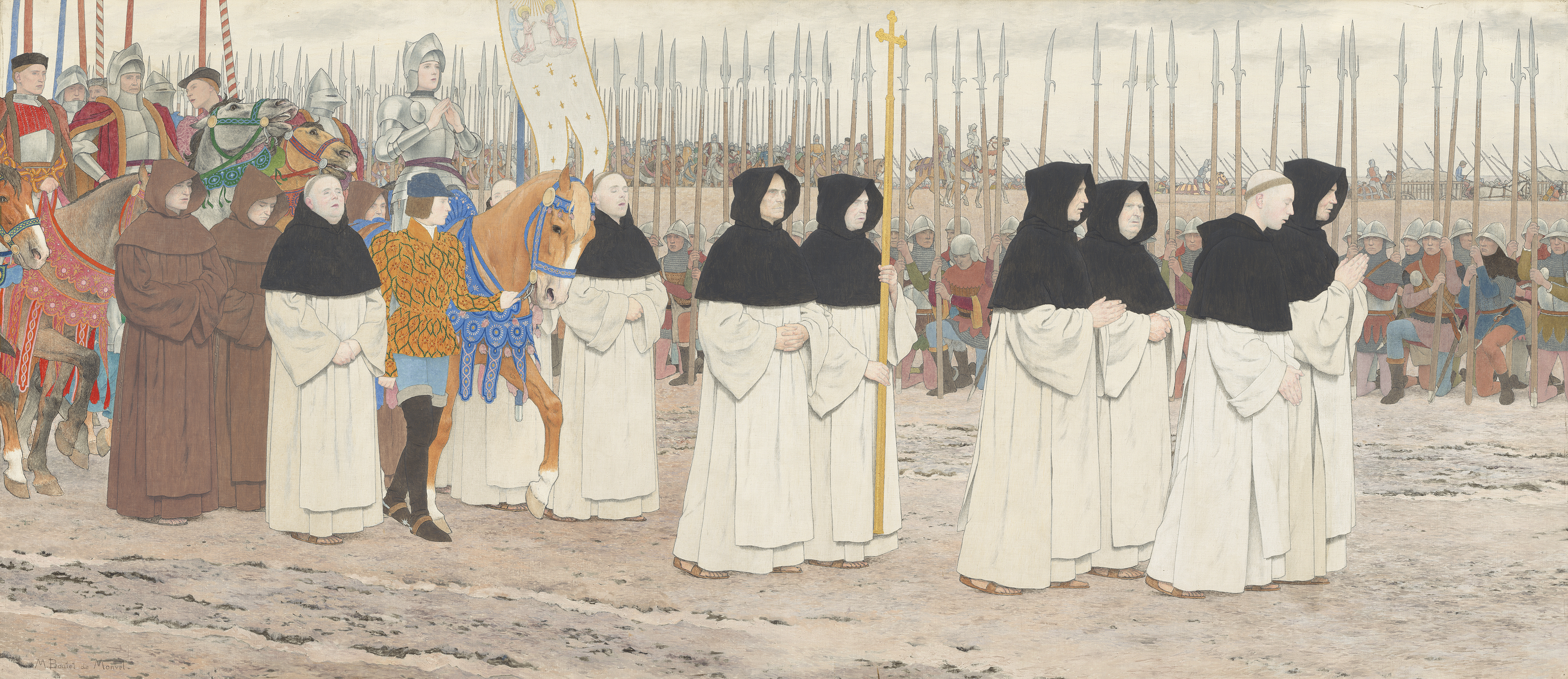
The Maid in Armor on Horseback from Jeanne D'Arc (1909)

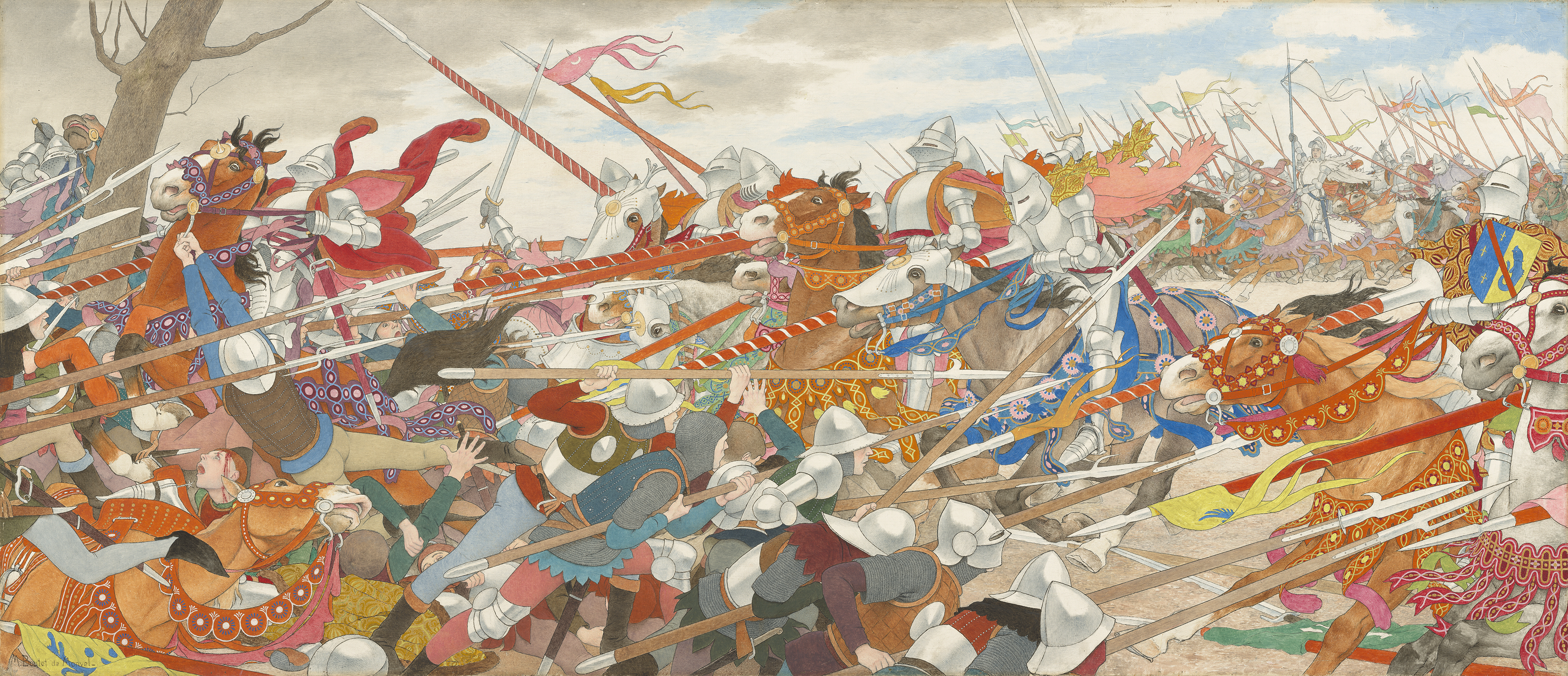
The Turmoil of Conflict from Jeanne D'Arc (1913)

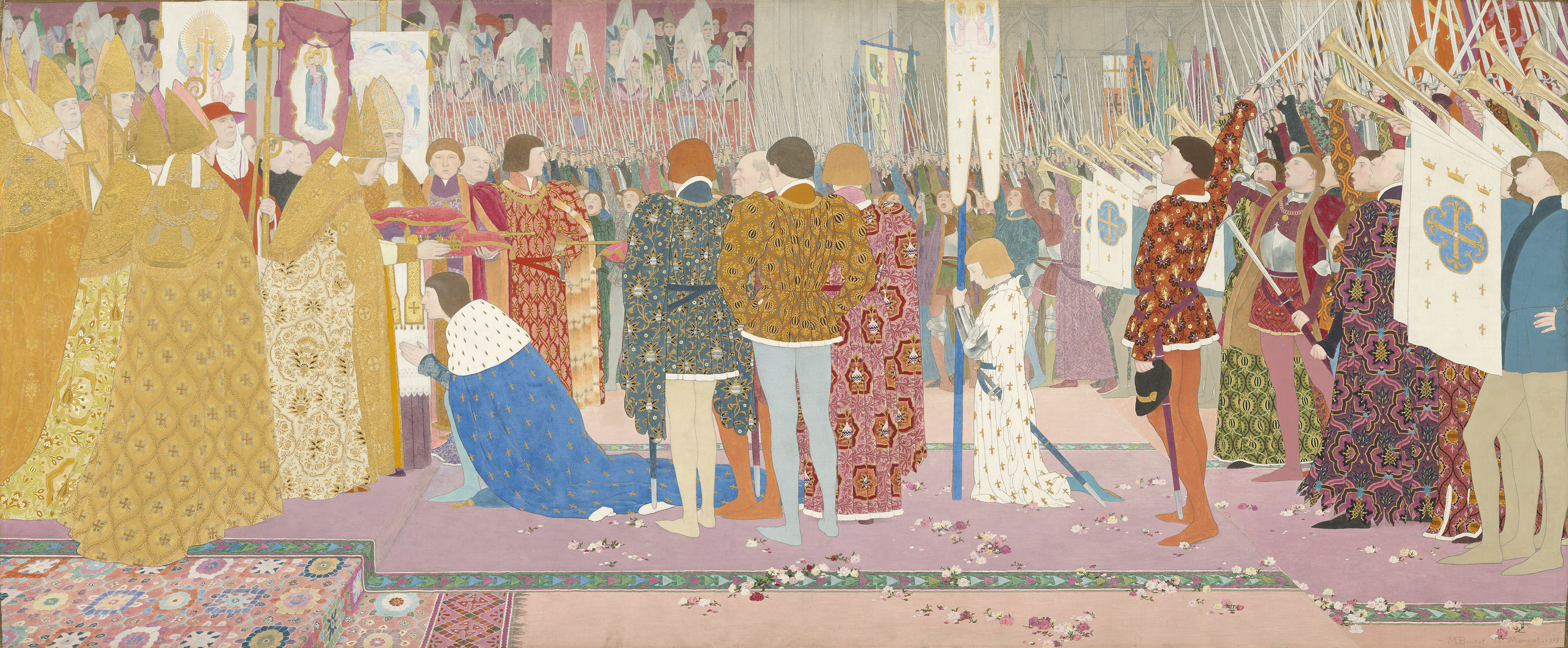
The Crowning at Rheims of the Dauphin Jeanne D'Arc (1907)

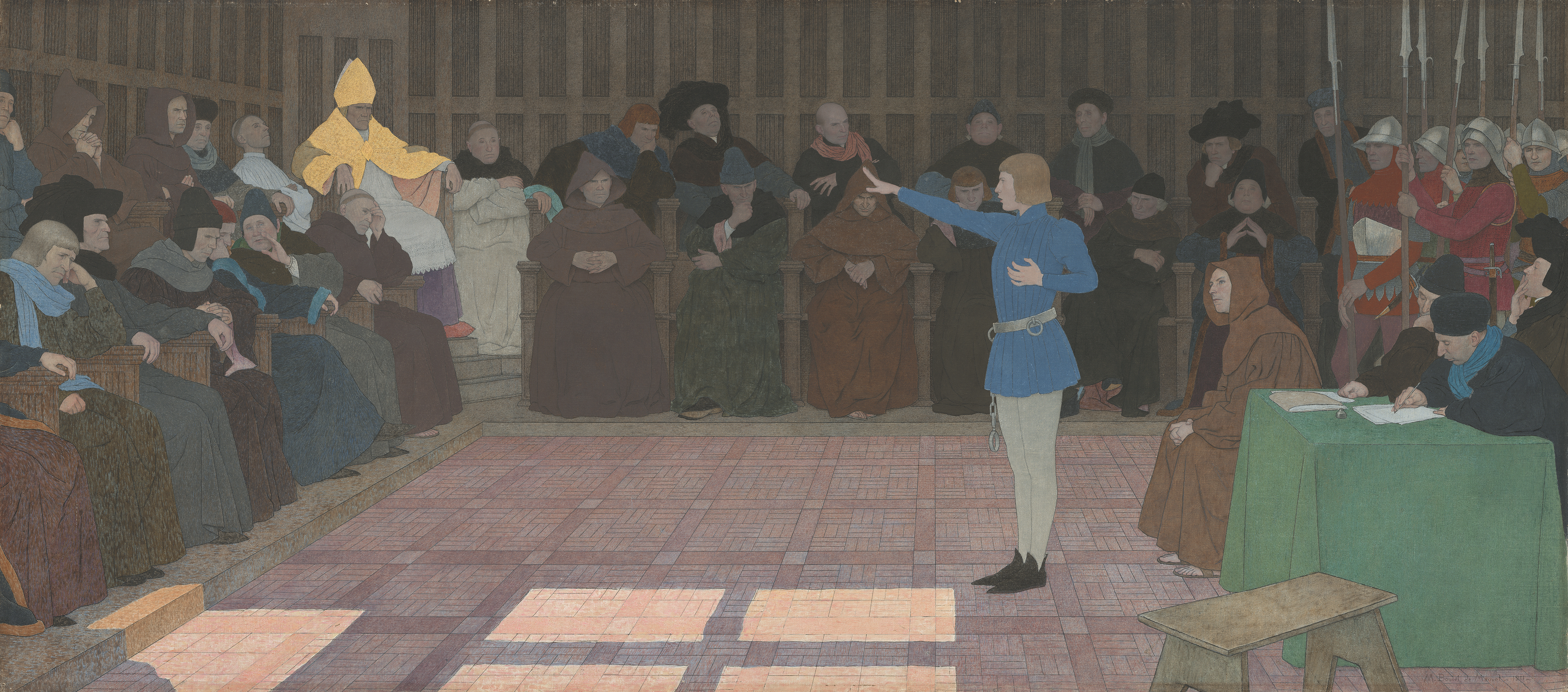
The Trial of Joan of Arc from Jeanne D'Arc (1909-1910)
