= Louis Boutet de Monvel =

French mathematician (1941–2014)

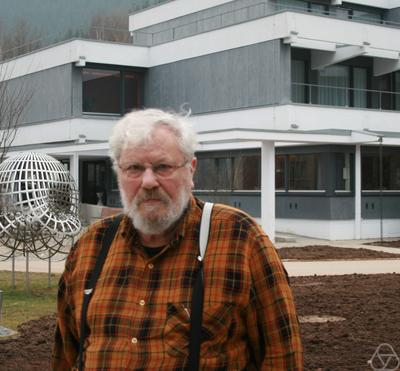
Boutet de Monvel at Oberwolfach in 2011

Louis Boutet de Monvel (22 June 1941 – 25 December 2014) was a French mathematician who worked on functional analysis.

He was a student of Laurent Schwartz in Paris and was professor at the Pierre and Marie Curie University. He was married to Anne Boutet de Monvel, also a mathematician.

In 2007, he was awarded the Émile Picard Medal of the French Academy of Sciences and in 2003 the Prix de l'État.

According to the Mathematics Genealogy Project his Ph.D. students are AbdelAli Attioui (1994), Jean-Marc Delort, Bernard Helffer (1976), Gilles Lebeau (1984), George Marinescu (1994), Philibert Nang (1996), Serge Lukasiewicz (1997), Alexander Rezounenko (1997).

== Publications ==
- "Publications de Louis Boutet de Monvel", Annales de l'Institut Fourier, 54 (5): 1141–1149, 2004, doi:10.5802/aif.2047, ISSN 0373-0956, MR 2127846
