= Geisser =

Geisser is a surname. Notable people with the surname include:

- Seymour Geisser (1929 – 2004), American statistician
- Thomas Geisser (born 1966), German mathematician
- Tobias Geisser (born 1999), Swiss professional ice hockey defenseman
- Vincent Geisser (born 1968), French sociologist and political scientist
- Walter Geisser (born 1950), Swiss former footballer
- Wilhelm Geisser (1889 –1964), Swiss footballer
