= Christopher Deninger =

German mathematician (born 1958)

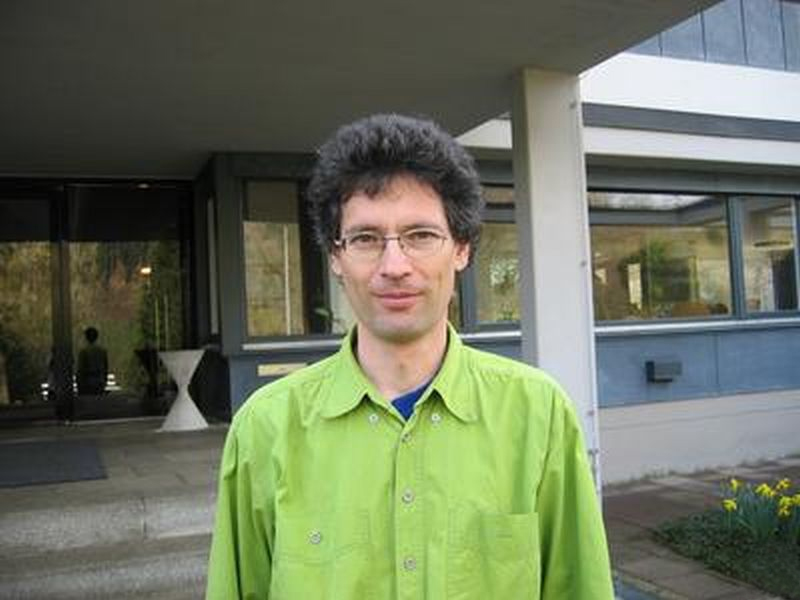
- Deninger at Oberwolfach, 2005
- Born: 8 April 1958 (age 68)
- Education: University of Cologne
- Scientific career
- Fields: Mathematics
- Workplaces: University of Münster
- Doctoral advisor: Curt Meyer
- Doctoral students: Guido Kings; Annette Huber-Klawitter; Annette Werner

Christopher Deninger (born 8 April 1958) is a German mathematician at the University of Münster. Deninger's research focuses on arithmetic geometry, including applications to L-functions.

== Career ==
Deninger obtained his doctorate from the University of Cologne in 1982, under the supervision of Curt Meyer. In 1992 he shared a Gottfried Wilhelm Leibniz Prize with Michael Rapoport, Peter Schneider and Thomas Zink. In 1998 he was a plenary speaker at the International Congress of Mathematicians in 1998 in Berlin. In 2012 he became a fellow of the American Mathematical Society.

== Mathematical work ==
=== Artin–Verdier duality ===
In a series of papers between 1984 and 1987, Deninger studied extensions of Artin–Verdier duality. Broadly speaking, Artin–Verdier duality, a consequence of class field theory, is an arithmetic analogue of Poincaré duality, a duality for sheaf cohomology on a compact manifold. In this parallel, the (spectrum of the) ring of integers in a number field corresponds to a 3-manifold. Following work of Mazur, Deninger (1984) extended Artin–Verdier duality to function fields. Deninger then extended these results in various directions, such as non-torsion sheaves (1986), arithmetic surfaces (1987), as well as higher-dimensional local fields (with Wingberg, 1986). The appearance of Bloch's motivic complexes considered in the latter papers influenced work of several authors including Geisser (2010), who identified Bloch's complexes to be the dualizing complexes over higher-dimensional schemes.

=== Special values of L-functions ===
Another group of Deninger's papers studies L-functions and their special values. A classical example of an L-function is the Riemann zeta function ζ(s), for which formulas such as

ζ(2) = π^{2} / 6

are known since Euler. In a landmark paper, Beilinson (1984) had proposed a set of far-reaching conjectures describing the special values of L-functions, i.e., the values of L-functions at integers. In very rough terms, Beilinson's conjectures assert that for a smooth projective algebraic variety X over Q, motivic cohomology of X should be closely related to Deligne cohomology of X. In addition, the relation between these two cohomology theories should explain, according to Beilinson's conjecture, the pole orders and the values of

L(h^{n}(X), s)

Any two of the three Borromean rings can be pulled apart, yet the three rings are linked. The Massey product of the three cohomology classes given by winding around each circle can be used to capture this phenomenon algebraically.

at integers s. Bloch and Beilinson proved essential parts of this conjecture for h^{1}(X) in the case where X is an elliptic curve with complex multiplication and s=2. In 1988, Deninger & Wingberg gave an exposition of that result. In 1989 and 1990, Deninger extended this result to certain elliptic curves considered by Shimura, at all s≥2. Deninger & Nart (1995) expressed the height pairing, a key ingredient of Beilinson's conjecture, as a natural pairing of Ext-groups in a certain category of motives. In 1995, Deninger studied Massey products in Deligne cohomology and conjectured therefrom a formula for the special value for the L-function of an elliptic curve at s=3, which was subsequently confirmed by Goncharov (1996). As of 2018, Beilinson's conjecture is still wide open, and Deninger's contributions remain some of the few cases where Beilinson's conjecture has been successfully attacked (surveys on the topic include Deninger & Scholl (1991), Nekovář (1994)).

=== L-functions via regularized determinants ===
The Riemann ζ-function is defined using a product of Euler factors

$$\zeta_p(s) := \frac 1 {1-p^{-s}}$$

for each prime number p. In order to obtain a functional equation for ζ(s), one needs to multiply them with an additional term involving the Gamma function:

$$\zeta_\infty(s) := 2^{-1/2} \pi^{-s/2} \Gamma(s/2).$$

More general L-functions are also defined by Euler products, involving, at each finite place, the determinant of the Frobenius endomorphism acting on l-adic cohomology of some variety X / Q, while the Euler factor for the infinite place are, according to Serre, products of Gamma functions depending on the Hodge structures attached to X / Q. Deninger (1991) expressed these Γ-factors in terms of regularized determinants and moved on, in 1992 and in greater generality in 1994, to unify the Euler factors of L-functions at both finite and infinite places using regularized determinants. For example, for the Euler factors of the Riemann zeta-function this uniform description reads

$$\zeta_p(s) = \det{}_\infty \left (\frac 1{2 \pi}(s - \Theta) | R_p ) \right)^{-1}.$$

Here p is either a prime number or infinity, corresponding to the non-Archimedean Euler factors and the Archimedean Euler factor respectively, and R_{p} is the space of finite real valued Fourier series on R/log(p)Z for a prime number p, and R_{∞} = R[exp(−2y)]. Finally, Θ is the derivative of the R-action given by shifting such functions. Deninger (1994) also exhibited a similar unifying approach for ε-factors (which express the ratio between completed L-functions at s and at 1−s).

=== The arithmetic site ===
These results led Deninger to propose a program concerning the existence of an "arithmetic site" Y associated to the compactification of Spec Z. Among other properties, this site would be equipped with an action of R, and each prime number p would correspond to a closed orbit of the R-action of length log(p). Moreover, analogies between formulas in analytic number theory and dynamics on foliated spaces led Deninger to conjecture the existence of a foliation on this site. Moreover, this site is supposed to be endowed with an infinite-dimensional cohomology theory such that the L-function of a motive M is given by

$$L(M, s) = \prod_{i=0}^2 \det{}_\infty \left (\frac 1 {2\pi}(s-\Theta)|H^i_c(Y, F(M)) \right ).$$

Here M is a motive, such as the motives h^{n}(X) occurring in Beilinson's conjecture, and F(M) is conceived to be the sheaf on Y attached to the motive M. The operator Θ is the infinitesimal generator of the flow given by the R-action. The Riemann hypothesis would be, according to this program, a consequence of properties parallel to the positivity of the intersection pairing in Hodge theory. A version of the Lefschetz trace formula on this site, which would be part of this conjectural setup, has been proven by other means by Deninger (1993). In 2010, Deninger proved that classical conjectures of Beilinson and Bloch concerning the intersection theory of algebraic cycles would be further consequences of his program.

This program was surveyed by Deninger in his talks at the European Congress of Mathematicians in 1992, at the International Congress of Mathematicians in 1998, and also by Leichtnam (2005). In 2002, Deninger constructed a foliated space which corresponds to an elliptic curve over a finite field, and Hesselholt (2016) showed that the Hasse-Weil zeta-function of a smooth proper variety over F_{p} can be expressed using regularized determinants involving topological Hochschild homology. In addition, the analogy between knots and primes has been fruitfully studied in arithmetic topology. However, as of 2018, the construction of a foliated space corresponding to Spec Z remains elusive.

=== Vector bundles on p-adic curves ===
A series of joint papers with Annette Werner examines vector bundles on p-adic curves. A classical result motivating this study is the Narasimhan–Seshadri theorem, a cornerstone of the Simpson correspondence. It asserts that a vector bundle on a compact Riemann surface X is stable if it arises from a unitary representation of the fundamental group π_{1}(X).

In Deninger & Werner (2005) established a p-adic analogue thereof: for a smooth projective algebraic curve over C_{p}, obtained by base change from $X / \overline \mathbf Q_p$, they constructed an action of the etale fundamental group π_{1}(X) on the fibers on certain vector bundles, including those of degree 0 and having potentially strongly semistable reduction. In another paper of 2005, they related the resulting representations of the fundamental group of the curve X with representations of the Tate module of the Jacobian variety of X. In 2007 and 2010 they continued this work by showing that such vector bundles form a Tannakian category which amounts to identifying this class of vector bundles as a category of representations of a certain group.

=== Foliations and the Heisenberg group ===
In several joint papers, Deninger and Wilhelm Singhof studied quotients of the n-dimensional Heisenberg group H by the standard lattice consisting of integer-valued matrices,

X = H / Γ,

from various points of view. In 1984, they computed the e-invariant of X in terms of ζ(−n), which leads to a construction of elements in the stable homotopy groups of spheres of arbitrarily large order. In 1988, they used methods of analytic number theory to give estimates on the dimension of the cohomology of nilpotent Lie algebras.

The classical fact from Hodge theory that any cohomology class on a Kähler manifold admits a unique harmonic had been generalized by Álvarez López & Kordyukov (2001) to Riemannian foliations. Deninger & Singhof (2001) show that foliations on the above space X, which satisfy only slightly weaker conditions, do not admit such Hodge theoretic properties. In another joint paper from 2001, they established a dynamical Lefschetz trace formula: it relates the trace of an operator on harmonic forms the local traces appearing at the closed orbits (on certain foliated spaces with an R-action). This result serves as a corroboration of Deninger's program mentioned above in the sense that it verifies a prediction made by this program on the analytic side, i.e., the one concerning dynamics on foliated spaces.

=== Entropy and Mahler measures ===
Another group of Deninger's papers revolves around the space

$$X_f := (\mathbf Z \Gamma / \mathbf Z \Gamma f)\widehat{\ }\ ,$$

where Γ is a discrete group, f is an element of its group ring ZΓ, and the hat denotes the Pontryagin dual. For Γ = Z^{n} and $f \in \mathbb Z[x_1^{\pm 1}, \dots, x_n^{\pm n}]$, Lind, Schmidt & Ward (1990) had shown that the entropy of the Γ-action on X_{f} is given by the Mahler measure

$$m(f) := (2 \pi i)^{-n} \int_{\mathbb R^n / \Gamma} \log |f(z_1, \dots, z_n)| \frac{ dz_1}{z_1} \dots \frac{ dz_n}{z_n}.$$

Moreover, it had been known that Mahler measures of certain polynomials were known to be expressible in terms of special values of certain L-functions. In 1997, Deninger observed that the integrand in the definition of the Mahler measure has a natural explanation in terms of Deligne cohomology. Using known cases of the Beilinson conjecture, he deduced that m(f) is the image of the symbol {f, t_{1}, ..., t_{n}} under the Beilinson regulator, where the variety is the complement in the n-dimensional torus of the zero set of f. This led to a conceptual explanation for the afore-mentioned formulas for Mahler measures. Besser & Deninger (1999) and Deninger later in 2009 carried over these ideas to the p-adic world, by replacing the Beilinson regulator map to Deligne cohomology by a regulator map to syntomic cohomology, and the logarithm appearing in the definition of the entropy by a p-adic logarithm.

In 2006 and 2007, Deninger and Klaus Schmidt pushed the parallel between entropy and Mahler measures beyond abelian groups, namely residually finite, countable discrete amenable groups Γ. They showed that the Γ-action on X_{f} is expansive if and only if f is invertible in the L^{1}-convolution algebra of Γ. Moreover, the logarithm of the Fuglede-Kadison determinant on the von Neumann algebra NΓ associated to Γ (which replaces the Mahler measure for Z^{n}) agrees with the entropy of the above action.

=== Witt vectors ===
Joachim Cuntz and Deninger worked together on Witt vectors. In two papers around 2014, they simplified the theory by giving a presentation of the ring of Witt vectors in terms of a completion of the monoid algebra ZR. This approach avoids the universal polynomials used in the classical definition of the addition of Witt vectors.

== Selected bibliography ==
=== Artin–Verdier duality ===
- Deninger, Christopher (1984), "On Artin–Verdier duality for function fields", Mathematische Zeitschrift, 188 (1): 91–100, doi:10.1007/BF01163876, MR 0767366, S2CID 123090400
- Deninger, Christopher (1986), "An extension of Artin–Verdier duality to nontorsion sheaves", J. Reine Angew. Math., 1986 (366): 18–31, doi:10.1515/crll.1986.366.18, MR 0833011, S2CID 116275426
- Deninger, Christopher; Wingberg, Kay (1986), "Artin–Verdier duality for n-dimensional local fields involving higher algebraic K-sheaves", Journal of Pure and Applied Algebra, 43 (3): 243–255, doi:10.1016/0022-4049(86)90066-6, MR 0868985
- Deninger, Christopher (1987), "Duality in the étale cohomology of one-dimensional proper schemes and generalizations", Mathematische Annalen, 277 (3): 529–541, doi:10.1007/BF01458330, MR 0891590, S2CID 120941469

=== L-functions and Beilinson's conjecture ===
- Deninger, Christopher; Wingberg, Kay (1988), "On the Beilinson conjectures for elliptic curves with complex multiplication", Beilinson's conjectures on special values of L-functions, Perspect. Math., vol. 4, Boston, MA: Academic Press, MR 0944996
- Deninger, Christopher (1989), "Higher regulators and Hecke L-series of imaginary quadratic fields. I", Inventiones Mathematicae, 96 (1): 1–69, Bibcode:1989InMat..96....1D, doi:10.1007/BF01393970, MR 0981737, S2CID 122586535
- Deninger, Christopher (1990), "Higher regulators and Hecke L-series of imaginary quadratic fields. II", Annals of Mathematics, Second Series, 132 (1): 131–158, doi:10.2307/1971502, JSTOR 1971502, MR 1059937
- Deninger, Christopher; Scholl, Anthony J. (1991), "The Beĭlinson conjectures", L-functions and arithmetic (Durham, 1989), London Math. Soc. Lecture Note Ser., vol. 153, Cambridge Univ. Press, pp. 173–209, doi:10.1017/CBO9780511526053.007, ISBN 9780521386197, MR 1110393
- Deninger, Christopher (1991), "On the Γ-factors attached to motives", Inventiones Mathematicae, 104 (2): 245–261, Bibcode:1991InMat.104..245D, doi:10.1007/BF01245075, MR 1098609, S2CID 123206613
- Deninger, Christopher (1992), "Local L-factors of motives and regularized determinants", Inventiones Mathematicae, 107 (1): 135–150, Bibcode:1992InMat.107..135D, doi:10.1007/BF01231885, MR 1135468, S2CID 120740473
- Deninger, Christopher (1993), "Lefschetz trace formulas and explicit formulas in analytic number theory", Journal für die reine und angewandte Mathematik, 1993 (441): 1–15, doi:10.1515/crll.1993.441.1, S2CID 116031228, Zbl 0782.11034
- Deninger, Christopher (1994a), "Motivic ε-factors at infinity and regularized dimensions", Indag. Math., New Series, 5 (4): 403–409, doi:10.1016/0019-3577(94)90015-9, MR 1307961
- Deninger, Christopher (1994b), "Motivic L-functions and regularized determinants", Motives (Seattle, WA, 1991), Proc. Sympos. Pure Math., vol. 55, Providence, RI: Amer. Math. Soc., MR 1265547
- Deninger, Christopher (1994c), "Evidence for a cohomological approach to analytic number theory", First European Congress of Mathematics, Vol. I (Paris, 1992), Progr. Math., vol. 119, Birkhäuser, Basel, pp. 491–510, MR 1341834
- Deninger, Christopher; Nart, Enric (1995), "On Ext^{2} of motives over arithmetic curves", Amer. J. Math., 117 (3): 601–625, doi:10.2307/2375082, JSTOR 2375082, MR 1333938
- Deninger, Christopher (1995), "Higher order operations in Deligne cohomology", Invent. Math., 120 (2): 289–315, Bibcode:1995InMat.120..289D, doi:10.1007/BF01241130, MR 1329043, S2CID 121481341
- Deninger, Christopher (1998), "Some analogies between number theory and dynamical systems on foliated spaces", Proceedings of the International Congress of Mathematicians, Vol. I (Berlin, 1998), Documenta Mathematica (Extra Vol. I), pp. 163–186, MR 1648030
- Deninger, Christopher (2002), "On the nature of the "explicit formulas" in analytic number theory---a simple example", Number theoretic methods (Iizuka, 2001), Dev. Math., vol. 8, Dordrecht: Kluwer Acad. Publ., pp. 97–118, arXiv:math/0204194, doi:10.1007/978-1-4757-3675-5_7, ISBN 978-1-4419-5239-4, MR 1974137, S2CID 17829739
- Deninger, Christopher (2010), "The Hilbert-Polya strategy and height pairings", Casimir force, Casimir operators and the Riemann hypothesis, Walter de Gruyter, Berlin, pp. 275–283, MR 2777722

=== p-adic vector bundles ===
- Deninger, Christopher; Werner, Annette (2005), "Vector bundles on p-adic curves and parallel transport", Annales Scientifiques de l'École Normale Supérieure, Quatrième Série, 38 (4): 553–597, arXiv:math/0403516, doi:10.1016/j.ansens.2005.05.002, MR 2172951, S2CID 8884837
- Deninger, Christopher; Werner, Annette (2005), "Line bundles and p-adic characters", Number fields and function fields–two parallel worlds, Progr. Math., vol. 239, pp. 101–131, arXiv:math/0407511, doi:10.1007/0-8176-4447-4_7, ISBN 978-0-8176-4397-3, MR 2176589, S2CID 119669442
- Deninger, Christopher; Werner, Annette (2007), "On Tannaka duality for vector bundles on p-adic curves", Algebraic cycles and motives. Vol. 2, London Math. Soc. Lecture Note Ser., vol. 344, pp. 94–111, MR 2187151
- Deninger, Christopher; Werner, Annette (2010), "Vector bundles on p-adic curves and parallel transport II", Algebraic and arithmetic structures of moduli spaces (Sapporo 2007), Adv. Stud. Pure Math., vol. 58, pp. 1–26, arXiv:0902.1437, doi:10.2969/aspm/05810001, ISBN 978-4-86497-008-2, MR 2676155

=== The Heisenberg group, Lie algebras, and foliations ===
- Deninger, Christopher; Singhof, Wilhelm (1984), "The e-invariant and the spectrum of the Laplacian for compact nilmanifolds covered by Heisenberg groups", Inventiones Mathematicae, 78 (1): 101–112, Bibcode:1984InMat..78..101D, doi:10.1007/BF01388716, MR 0762355, S2CID 119465585
- Deninger, Christopher; Singhof, Wilhelm (1988), "On the cohomology of nilpotent Lie algebras", Bull. Soc. Math. France, 116 (1): 3–14, doi:10.24033/bsmf.2087, MR 0946276
- Deninger, Christopher; Singhof, Wilhelm (2001), "A counterexample to smooth leafwise Hodge decomposition for general foliations and to a type of dynamical trace formulas", Ann. Inst. Fourier (Grenoble), 51 (1): 209–219, doi:10.5802/aif.1821, MR 1821074
- Deninger, Christopher; Singhof, Wilhelm (2001b), "A note on dynamical trace formulas", Dynamical, spectral, and arithmetic zeta functions (San Antonio, TX, 1999), Contemp. Math., vol. 290, AMS, pp. 41–55, doi:10.1090/conm/290/04572, ISBN 9780821820797, MR 1868467

=== Entropy ===
- Deninger, Christopher (1997), "Deligne periods of mixed motives, K-theory and the entropy of certain Z^{n}-actions", Journal of the American Mathematical Society, 10 (2): 259–281, doi:10.1090/S0894-0347-97-00228-2, MR 1415320
- Deninger, Christopher (2006), "Fuglede-Kadison determinants and entropy for actions of discrete amenable groups", Journal of the American Mathematical Society, 19 (3): 737–758, arXiv:math/0502233, doi:10.1090/S0894-0347-06-00519-4, MR 2220105, S2CID 7741105
- Deninger, Christopher; Schmidt, Klaus (2007), "Expansive algebraic actions of discrete residually finite amenable groups and their entropy", Ergodic Theory and Dynamical Systems, 27 (3): 769–786, arXiv:math/0605723, doi:10.1017/S0143385706000939, MR 2322178, S2CID 12803685
- Besser, Amnon; Deninger, Christopher (1999), "p-adic Mahler measures", Journal für die reine und angewandte Mathematik, 1999 (517): 19–50, doi:10.1515/crll.1999.093, MR 1728549
- Deninger, Christopher (2009), "p-adic entropy and a p-adic Fuglede-Kadison determinant", Algebra, arithmetic, and geometry: in honor of Yu. I. Manin. Vol. I, Progr. Math., vol. 269, Birkhäuser, pp. 423–442, arXiv:math/0608539, doi:10.1007/978-0-8176-4745-2_10, ISBN 978-0-8176-4744-5, MR 2641178, S2CID 6186513

=== Witt vectors ===
- Cuntz, Joachim; Deninger, Christopher (2015), "Witt vector rings and the relative de Rham Witt complex", Journal of Algebra, 440: 545–593, arXiv:1410.5249, doi:10.1016/j.jalgebra.2015.05.029, MR 3373405, S2CID 119171724
- Cuntz, Joachim; Deninger, Christopher (2014), "An alternative to Witt vectors", Münster Journal of Mathematics, 7 (1): 105–114, arXiv:1311.2774, Bibcode:2013arXiv1311.2774C, doi:10.1080/18756891.2013.858905, MR 3271241
