= Soliman shooting =

2007 Islamist attack in Tunisia

- Part of Insurgency in the Maghreb (2002–present)
Date	3 January 2007
Location	Near Soliman
Result	Tunisian government victory

Belligerents
Tunisia	GSPC

Commanders and leaders
	Lassaad Sassi

Units involved
Tunisian police forces	≈40 men of Assad ibn al-Furat's army, related to the GSPC

Casualties and losses
2 death	12 deaths 15 prisoners

The Soliman shooting was a shootout that occurred on January 3, 2007 in the Tunisian region of Soliman, south-east of Tunis. The national police forces fought an armed group calling itself "Asad ibn al-Furat's army" which had been initially labeled by the government as "dangerous criminals". A previous shooting involving this same group had taken place on December 23, 2006, placing it in a context of jihadist terrorism and anarchist, insurgent, Islamist militancy.

Presented at first as a case of great banditry, a phenomenon little known in the country, the international and Tunisian press quickly managed to pinpoint the group's connection with Salafist Islamist terrorism, established in the Maghreb post-9/11. This connection was found especially in the neighboring territory of Algeria, from where the group, composed mainly of Tunisians, infiltrated.

For the French political scientist Vincent Geisser, this emergence of violent international Islamism in Tunisia marked a separation from Tunisian political Islamism, repressed in the 1990s through the Ennahda movement. According to him, this development would be the result of the "strategic systematic repression of the opponents" that would develop on the sidelines of political parties while allowing the government to justify the security strategy in place to the Westerners.

Apart from the Ghriba synagogue bombing in spring 2002, the country had never been targeted by the Islamist movement. But, like other Arab societies, Tunisia is seeing the return of the hijab, the rise of religion, the success of religious programs and the enlistment of several hundred young Tunisians under the banner of Jihad in Iraq. Following the Tunisian revolution, members of the Assad ibn al-Furat's army were liberated, associating themselves with the Tunisian Salafist movement.

== Events ==
=== Preparation ===
It is in an Islamist maquis not far from Tébessa, in eastern Algeria, that Lassaad Sassi receives approval from leaders of the Salafist Group for Preaching and Combat (GSPC) to infiltrate Tunisia and create logistics support cells to recruit and train future terrorists. He managed to convince four fellow Tunisians (Mohamed Hedi Ben Khlifa, Zouhair Riabi, Mohamed Mahmoudi and Tarak Hammami) and a Mauritanian (Mohammadou Maqam Maqam aka "Chokri") to accompany him. The night of the 22 into the 23rd of April, 2006, the commando crossed the border, overtaking Jebel ech Chambi, after four days of walking.

The next day, Sassi and Ben Khlifa went to Kasserine for supplies. A few days later, Hammami and Mahmoudi went to Sfax to find a cache, but were arrested by security forces in Kasserine on April 27 for possession of grenades. Ben Khlifa then contacted is brother-in-law in Sidi Bouzid for shelter without success. The group then made contact with members of a Salafist cell in Tunis, went to the capital in early June and finally found a hideout near Hammam-Lif. During the summer and into autumn, the group of about twenty members changed hideouts several times, staying in a restricted area, and began manufacturing explosives, preferring to attack by car bomb as operating procedures against "vital infrastructures" of the Republic, "symbolic objectives" as well as "foreign interests" and "Tunisian and foreign personalities".

It was then that about fifteen members of a Salafist cell in Sousse, mostly aged 25 to 30, believing they had been found out by the police, took refuge in a cave located in the Ain Tbornog mountains, on the heights of Grombalia, at the end of November 2006. At the beginning of December, the various groups united and Sassi was proclaimed "emir" of the cell. The camp was set a five-hour walk from the nearest road with a handful of fighters guarding the hideout of Hammam Chott where explosives, food and money were stored.

=== First snap ===
According to the French paper Le Figaro, everything started on December 23 around six thirty at the entrance of Borj Cédria, a locality south of Tunis.

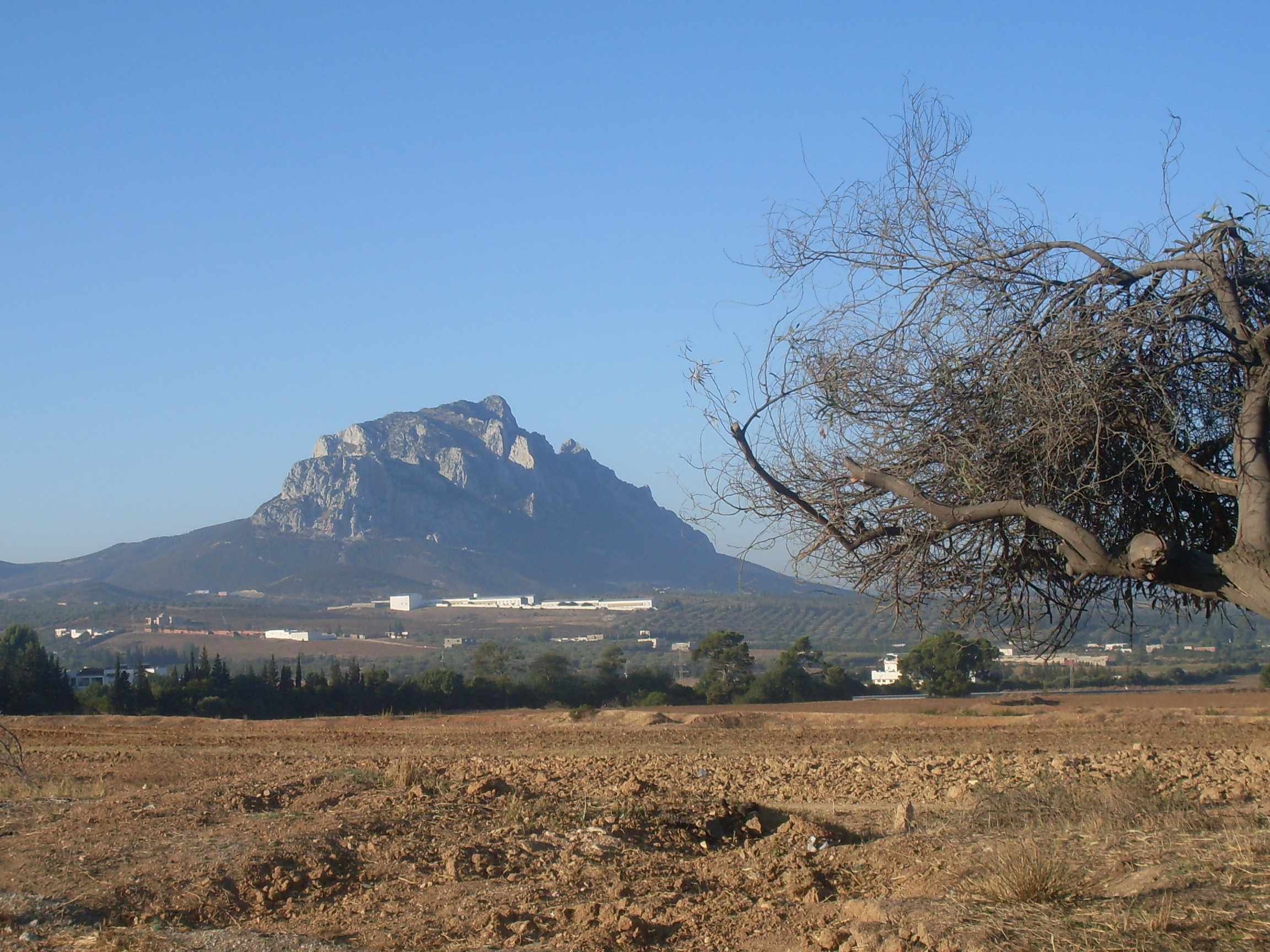
Djebel Ressas mountains where the group retreated at first

The occupants of a rental car refused to comply with a control of the National Guard, which started chasing the vehicle. The fugitives took refuge in a house in the locality of Bir El Bey, where they found armed companions. A first exchange of fire then took place: two members of the group were shot dead, and two others arrested while two law enforcement officers were wounded, one severely. According to a source close to the investigation, it would seem that it was the arrest of Osama Hajji, a Salafist linked to members of the Sousse cell, who put the police on the group's tail. The police then surrounded the hideout of Hammam Chott, where the militants opened fire.

After several hours of shooting, three policemen were wounded, two militants killed (including Zouhair Riabi), and a third arrested, while a last managed to flee. The other members of the armed group manage to escape, and fall back into the wooded mountain range of Djebel Ressas. Meanwhile, the police found an abundance of provisions and a stock of weapons in the abandoned house, called reinforcements, elite troops and armed forces, supported by helicopters, and began to rake the area.

At the same time, a special force, including police, the National Guard and the army, was deployed on the A1 motorway linking Tunis to the south of the country, and police checkpoints were set up at the entrances of major cities, to carry out checks. They were also positioned around sensitive establishments such as hotels. The following day, a dispatch from the official news agency Tunis Afrique Presse evoked a clash between police and "a gang of dangerous criminals". Most Tunisian newspapers, including Al Chourouk and Le Quotidien, immediately published a news item related to international arms or drug trafficking. But some private newspapers, including the dailies Essarih and Assabah, evoked the hypothesis of a terrorist group. The latter also being favored by the Tunisian opposition. For their part, sources close to power privately admitted that the clash involved Tunisian, Algerian and Mauritanian Islamists from Algeria. The daily Al-Hayat confirmed that "these armed men have infiltrated the country from Algeria".

=== Operation ===
On 28 December, the army launched an operation in the Ain Tbornog mountains. However, an alert was given and Sassi ordered his fighters to prepare to resist. They managed to repel the police until dusk while helicopters flying over the low-lying area could not locate them. As night fell, the group retreated to another mountain. The next day, assaulted again, Sassi decided to split his forces into four groups: the last two, a dozen men strong, had to fall back on Sousse and the first two, which counted also a dozen fighters, had to find refuge in Tunis. Inexperienced and unarmed, almost all members of the last three groups fell into the hands of the police forces in the hours or days that followed. One of them blew himself up at the time of his arrest, killing an army officer, while another was killed in unclear circumstances.

Further shots were also heard on the morning of December 31 at Bab Saadoun, near the Tunis court. According to sources of the Tunisian opposition, several police stations and barracks of the gendarmerie were the target of attacks in the region of Kairouan, the objective of the attackers being to recover arms. However, this information could not be confirmed later.

Only the members of Sassi's group managed to pass through the cracks and get to the village of Soliman after five days of running. Sassi was killed during a clash, probably at the dawn of January 3. Rabia Bacha accompanied by Chokri went around 4 o'clock in the morning June 1 to the district where his parents lived. As Bacha prepared to enter his home, police hiding in the house opposite opened fire. The exchange of fire lasted two or even three hours according to sources. Bacha and Chokri slain, police forces then launched a final assault against the rest of the group, Ben Khlifa, Sahbi El Masrouki, Makram Jrid, Mehdi El Mejri and Riadh Miri, who were waiting for the two men in a house in isolated construction at the entrance to the city. According to a testimony collected by Agence France-Presse, one of them was reported to have surrendered to this group of five men and four others were reportedly killed after violent clashes with the police, allegedly using a tank, according to an eyewitness speaking with anonymity. An amateur video taken during the events shows a Fiat 6614 of the Tunisian army which is a light transport vehicle.

The newspaper Al Chourouk attributed the intensity of the shootings to the group's possession of weapons including "machine guns and RPG-type rocket launchers" along with "the presence of well-trained or even combat-trained members and the use of weapons for some". In addition, the members of the group allegedly wore bullet-proof vests.

== Reactions ==
On January 12, for the first time since the shooting, Interior Minister Rafiq Belhaj Kacem officially spoke out and confirmed most of the information disclosed by the Tunisian press. He described the group as "Salafist Terrorists" and said that all activists were Tunisians with the exception of one Mauritanian. He explained that the police were monitoring this group, six of whom had infiltrated from Algeria, and had waited for the cell to assemble before going into action with the help of the police and army, which the Tunisian Embassy in France confirmed in January 2008. It also states that "explosives, embassy situation plans and names of foreign diplomats accredited in Tunisia were seized by the police". However, he did not indicate the identity of the diplomats or countries whose embassies were targeted. He finally reported two dead and three wounded police officers and soldiers who clashed with gang members. The police system set up around Cape Bon was gradually lightened, but many dams are maintained on the roads leading from Tunis to Hammamet.

The Secretary-General of the Tunisian League for Human Rights denounced this "gross manipulation of presenting terrorists as common criminals". The Communist Workers' Party of Tunisia, through its media outlet Al Badil, denounced the "black-out" media that "opened the door to all possible speculation around the identity of the armed group and provoked a mass panic with reports of other clashes across the city resulting in many deaths". It warned the regime to take advantage of these events, restricting travel via road checkpoints.

As of January 3, reports are circulating that the police have carried out dozens of arrests throughout the country. For the Progressive Democratic Party, these arrests were reported to have taken place in Soliman, in the southern suburbs of Tunis, Kef, Sidi Bouzid, Kasserine and Gafsa. In Bizerte, young men were reportedly arrested at some mosques, according to a statement from the local party. However, a government source denied this information on January 17, declaring it "irresponsible to indulge in unscrupulous speculation".

== Series of lawsuits ==
The alleged terrorists are charged on September 8 with the following charges:

- belonging to an organization that has made terrorism a means to achieve its purposes;
- participation in military training for the purpose of committing terrorist crimes
- possession, carrying and transport of weapons, ammunition and explosives;
- recruitment and training of a group of people in a terrorist enterprise;
- provision of weapons and explosives for the benefit of a terrorist organization;
- participation in an armed rebellion in the course of which officials were harmed and resulting in death;
- attempted intentional homicide with premeditation;
- inciting people to kill each other and to cause disorder and murder on Tunisian territory.

Ten charges are laid against 30 defendants aged between 22 and 42, of whom 29 faced the death penalty.

Following the fall of President Ben Ali in 2011, a general amnesty benefited the 30 members of the group sentenced. The reconstruction of the facts, following the release of jihadist members involved in the shooting of Soliman after the Tunisian Revolution, lent itself to forms of media manipulation of the public opinion in order to make the attempt of jihadist insurrection pass for "a staging of a heroic epic", thus preparing analogies with the propaganda of terrorist groups like the Islamic State.
