= Nizioł =

Nizioł is a Polish-language surname originated as a colloquial nickname for a person of short stature, from the adjective niski, 'low'. Archaic feminine forms: Niziołowa (by husband), Niziołówna (by father). An early record of the surname is dated by 1785. Notable people with the surname include:

- Bartek Niziol (born 1974), Polish violinist
- Wiesława Nizioł, Polish mathematician
