= Annette Werner =

German mathematician

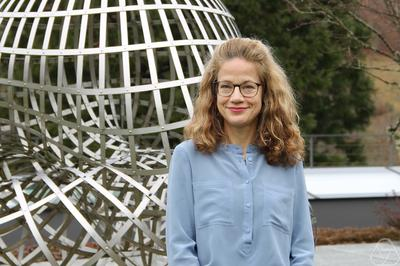
Werner at Oberwolfach in 2022

Annette Werner (born 1966) is a German mathematician. Her research interests include diophantine geometry and the algebraic geometry of non-Archimedean ordered fields, including the study of buildings, Berkovich spaces, and tropical geometry. She is a professor of mathematics at Goethe University Frankfurt.

== Education and career ==
Werner earned a diploma in mathematics from the University of Münster in 1991. She earned her Ph.D. at the same university in 1995, jointly supervised by Christopher Deninger and Siegfried Bosch; her dissertation was Local Heights on Uniformized Abelian Varieties and on Mumford Curves. She also completed her habilitation at Münster in 2000.

She worked as a postdoctoral researcher at the Max Planck Institute for Mathematics in Bonn in 1997–1998, and as an assistant at Münster from 1998 to 2003. She became a professor at the University of Siegen in 2004, but in the same year moved to the University of Stuttgart. She has been at the University of Frankfurt since 2007.

== Book ==
Werner is the author of a German-language book on elliptic curve cryptography, Elliptische Kurven in der Kryptographie (Springer, 2002).

== Recognition ==
Werner was Emmy Noether Lecturer of the German Mathematical Society in Munich in 2010.
