= Thomas Zink =

German mathematician (born 1949)

- Born: 14 April 1949 (age 76); Berlin
- Known for: Works on Shimura varieties and p-divisible formal groups
- Awards: Leibniz Prize (1992)
- Scientific career
- Fields: Mathematics
- Institutions: Bielefeld University

Thomas Zink (born 14 April 1949 in Berlin) is a German mathematician. He currently holds a chair for arithmetic algebraic geometry at Bielefeld University. He has been doing research at the Institute for Advanced Study in Princeton, at the University of Toronto and at the University of Bonn among others.

In 1992, he was awarded the Gottfried Wilhelm Leibniz Prize of the Deutsche Forschungsgemeinschaft joint with Christopher Deninger (Westfälische Wilhelms-Universität of Münster), Michael Rapoport (University of Wuppertal) and Peter Schneider (University of Cologne). The four researchers succeeded to apply modern methods of algebraic geometry to the solution of diophantine equations. Furthermore, he is a member of the German Academy of Sciences Leopoldina (Halle an der Saale).
