= Annette Huber-Klawitter =

German mathematician

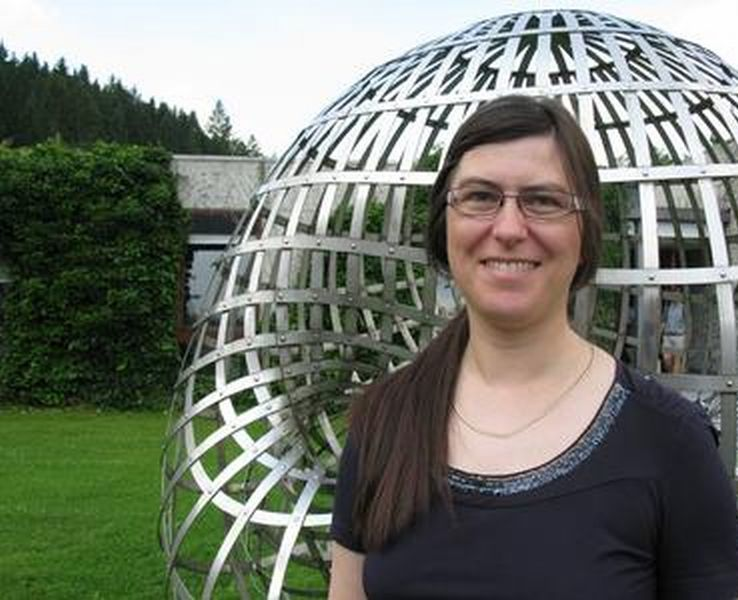
- Huber-Klawitter at Oberwolfach, 2009
- Born: 23 May 1967 (age 59); Frankfurt am Main, West Germany
- Education: University of Münster
- Awards: Heinz Maier-Leibnitz Prize (1995); EMS Prize (1996)
- Scientific career
- Fields: Mathematics
- Workplaces: University of Freiburg; University of Leipzig
- Doctoral advisor: Christopher Deninger

Annette Huber-Klawitter (née Huber, born 23 May 1967) is a German mathematician at the University of Freiburg. Her research interests includes algebraic geometry, in particular the Bloch–Kato conjectures.

== Early life and education ==
Annette Huber-Klawitter was born on 23 May 1967 in Frankfurt am Main. Between 1984 and 1986, she won the Bundeswettbewerb Mathematik, a national mathematics competition, three times in a row.

She began her academic career at the Goethe University Frankfurt and obtained her doctorate from the University of Münster in 1994. Her PhD dissertation was titled Realisierung von gemischten Motiven in derivierten Kategorien und ihre Kohomologie ("Realisation of mixed motives in derived categories and their cohomologies") and completed under the supervision of Christopher Deninger. From 1995 to 1996, she spent two years as a postdoctoral fellow at the University of California, Berkeley.

== Career ==
In 1995, Huber-Klawitter won the Heinz Maier-Leibnitz Prize, and in 1996, she won an EMS Prize.

She completed her Habilitation in 1999 at the University of Münster. In 2000, she became a professor of pure mathematics at the University of Leipzig. Since 2008, she is the chair of Number Theory at the University of Freiburg.

She was an invited speaker at the 2002 International Congress of Mathematicians in Beijing.

In 2008, she was elected a member of the German National Academy of Sciences Leopoldina. In 2012 she became a fellow of the American Mathematical Society.

== Selected publications ==
- Mixed Motives and their realization in derived categories, Lecture notes in Mathematics 1604, Springer 1995
- with J. Wildeshaus: Classical motivic polylogarithm according to Beilinson and Deligne. Doc. Math. 3 (1998), 27–133
- with Guido Kings: Degeneration of l-adic Eisenstein classes and of the elliptic polylog. Invent. Math. 135 (1999), no. 3, 545–594.
- Was wir über Gleichungen vom Grad 3 (nicht) wissen: Elliptische Kurven und die Vermutung von Birch und Swinnerton-Dyer, in Facettenreiche Mathematik. Einblicke in die moderne mathematische Forschung für alle, die mehr von Mathematik verstehen wollen, Vieweg/Teubner 2011, S. 215–236
- with de:Stefan Müller-Stach: Periods and Nori motives, Springer, Ergebnisse der Mathematik und ihrer Grenzgebiete, 2017
