= Curt Meyer =

German mathematician

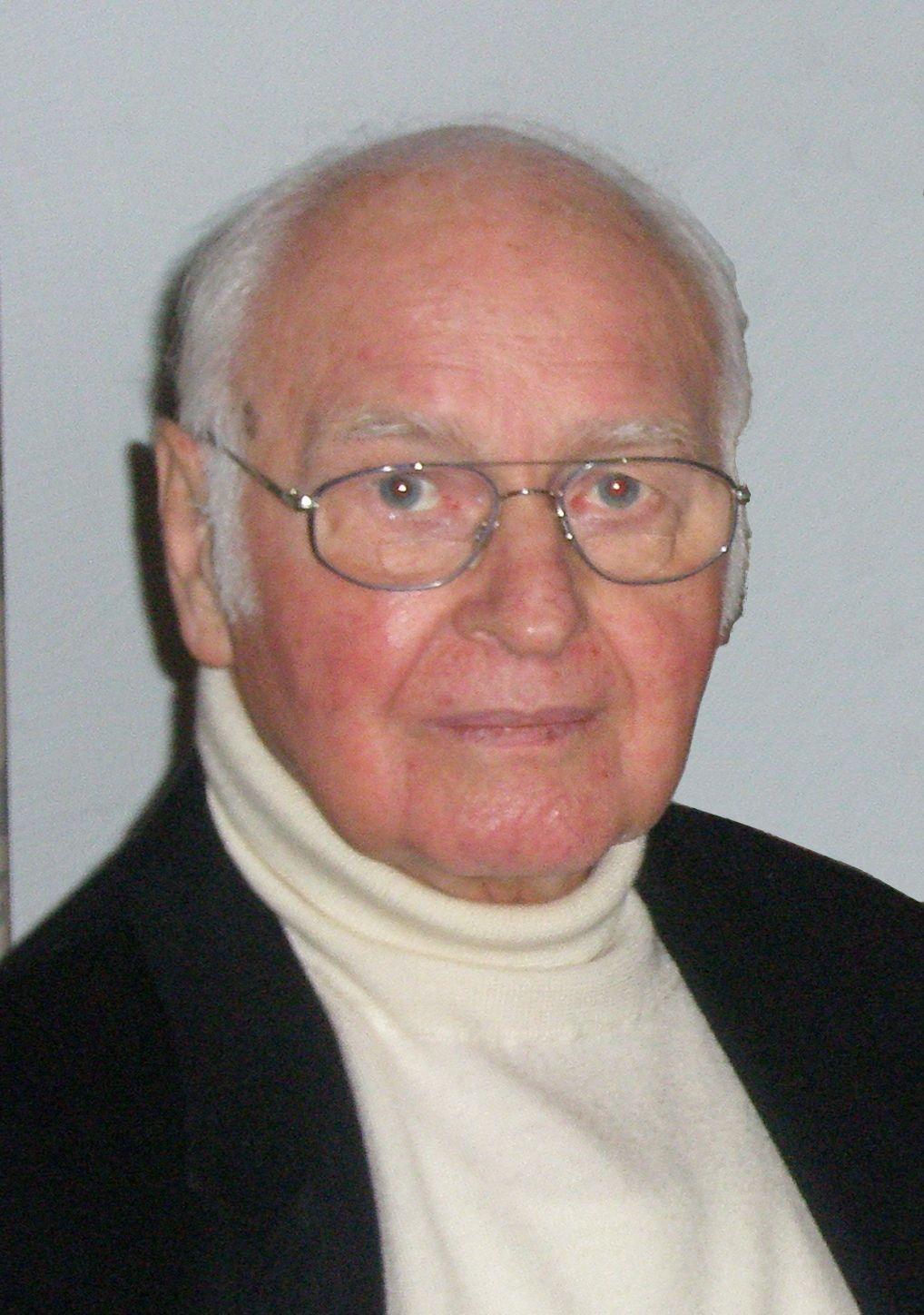
- Born: 19 November 1919; Bremerhaven, Germany
- Died: 18 April 2011 (aged 91); Bergisch Gladbach, Germany
- Education: Humboldt University of Berlin
- Scientific career
- Fields: Mathematics
- Workplaces: University of Cologne
- Doctoral advisor: Helmut Hasse
- Doctoral students: Christopher Deninger

Curt Meyer (19 November 1919 – 18 April 2011) was a German mathematician. He made notable contributions to number theory.

A native of Bremerhaven, Meyer obtained his doctorate from the Humboldt University of Berlin in 1950, under supervision of Helmut Hasse. In 1966 he became professor of mathematics at the University of Cologne, a position he held until 1985.

Among his most important results is an alternative solution to the class number 1 problem, building on the original Stark–Heegner theorem.

== Books by Meyer ==
- Die Berechnung der Klassenzahl abelscher Körper über quadratischen Zahlkörpern. Berlin: Akademie-Verlag. 1957.
- Zur Theorie und Praxis der elliptischen Einheiten. Saarbrücken: Fachbereich Mathematik, Universität des Saarlandes. 1995.
