= Peter Schneider (mathematician) =

German mathematician

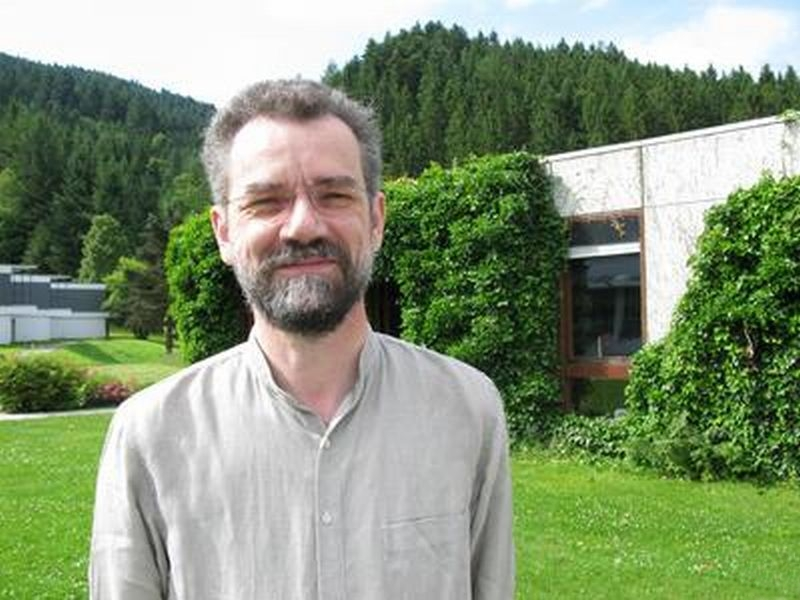
Schneider at Oberwolfach, 2009

Peter Bernd Schneider (born 9 January 1953 in Karlsruhe) is a German mathematician, specializing in the p-adic aspects of algebraic number theory, arithmetic algebraic geometry, and representation theory.

== Education and career ==
Peter Schneider studied mathematics in Karlsruhe and Erlangen. After his Diplom in 1977 from the University of Erlangen-Nuremberg, he was an assistant from 1977 to 1983 at the University of Regensburg. There he received in 1980 his PhD with advisor Jürgen Neukirch and dissertation Die Galoiscohomologie $p$-adischer Darstellungen über Zahlkörpern (The Galois cohomology of $p$-adic representations of number fields). Schneider habilitated in 1982 at the University of Regensburg. He was a postdoc at Harvard University for the academic year 1983–1984 and a C2-professor at Heidelberg University for the academic year 1984–1985. He was a C4-professor from 1985 to 1994 at the University of Cologne and is since 1994 a C-4 professor at the University of Münster.

His research includes Iwasawa theory, special values of $L$-functions. and $p$-adic representations (in the latter subject he has collaborated extensively with Jeremy Teitelbaum).

In 1992 Schneider, together with Christopher Deninger, Michael Rapoport and Thomas Zink, received the Gottfried Wilhelm Leibniz Prize for their work in using arithmetic-algebraic geometry to solve Diophantine equations. In 2006 he was an invited speaker with talk Continuous representation theory of p-adic Lie groups at the International Congress of Mathematicians in Madrid. In 2016 he was elected a member of the German National Academy of Sciences Leopoldina and the Academia Europaea.

== Selected publications ==
=== Articles ===
- with U. Stuhler: Schneider, P.; Stuhler, U. (1991), "The cohomology of $p$-adic symmetric spaces", Inventiones Mathematicae, 105 (1): 47–122, Bibcode:1991InMat.105...47S, doi:10.1007/BF01232257, S2CID 121926118
- with U. Stuhler: Schneider, Peter; Stuhler, Ulrich (1997), "Representation theory and sheaves on the Bruhat-Tits building" (PDF), Publications Mathématiques de l'Institut des Hautes Études Scientifiques, 85: 97–191, doi:10.1007/BF02699536
- with J. Teitelbaum: Schneider, P.; Teitelbaum, J. (2002), "Banach space representations and Iwasawa theory", Israel Journal of Mathematics, 127: 359–380, arXiv:math/0005066, doi:10.1007/BF02784538
- with J. Teitelbaum: Schneider, Peter; Teitelbaum, Jeremy (2003), "Algebras of $p$-adic distributions and admissible representations", Inventiones Mathematicae, 153 (1): 145–196, arXiv:math/0206056, Bibcode:2003InMat.153..145S, doi:10.1007/s00222-002-0284-1
- Schneider, Peter (2015), "Smooth representations and Hecke modules in characteristic $p$", Pacific Journal of Mathematics, 279 (1–2): 447–464, doi:10.2140/pjm.2015.279.447

=== Books ===
- Nonarchimedean Functional Analysis. Springer Science & Business Media. 20 November 2001. ISBN 978-3-540-42533-5.
- p-adic Lie groups, Grundlehren der mathematischen Wissenschaften, Springer Verlag, 2011
- Modular Representation Theory of Finite Groups. Springer Science & Business Media. 27 November 2012. ISBN 978-1-4471-4832-6.
- Galois Representations and (φ,Γ)-modules. Vol. 164. Cambridge University Press, 2017 ISBN 978-1-107-18858-7
- as editor, with Norbert Schappacher and Michael Rapoport: Beilinson’s conjectures on special values of L-functions, Academic Press, Boston 1988, ISBN 0-12-581120-9 (Oberwolfach-Tagung; Perspectives in Mathematics 4); 2014 reprint
- as editor, with John H. Coates, Sujatha Ramdorai, and Otmar Venjakob: Noncommutative Iwasawa Main Conjectures over Totally Real Fields: Münster, April 2011. Springer Science & Business Media. 19 October 2012. ISBN 978-3-642-32198-6.
