= Thomas Geisser =

German mathematician

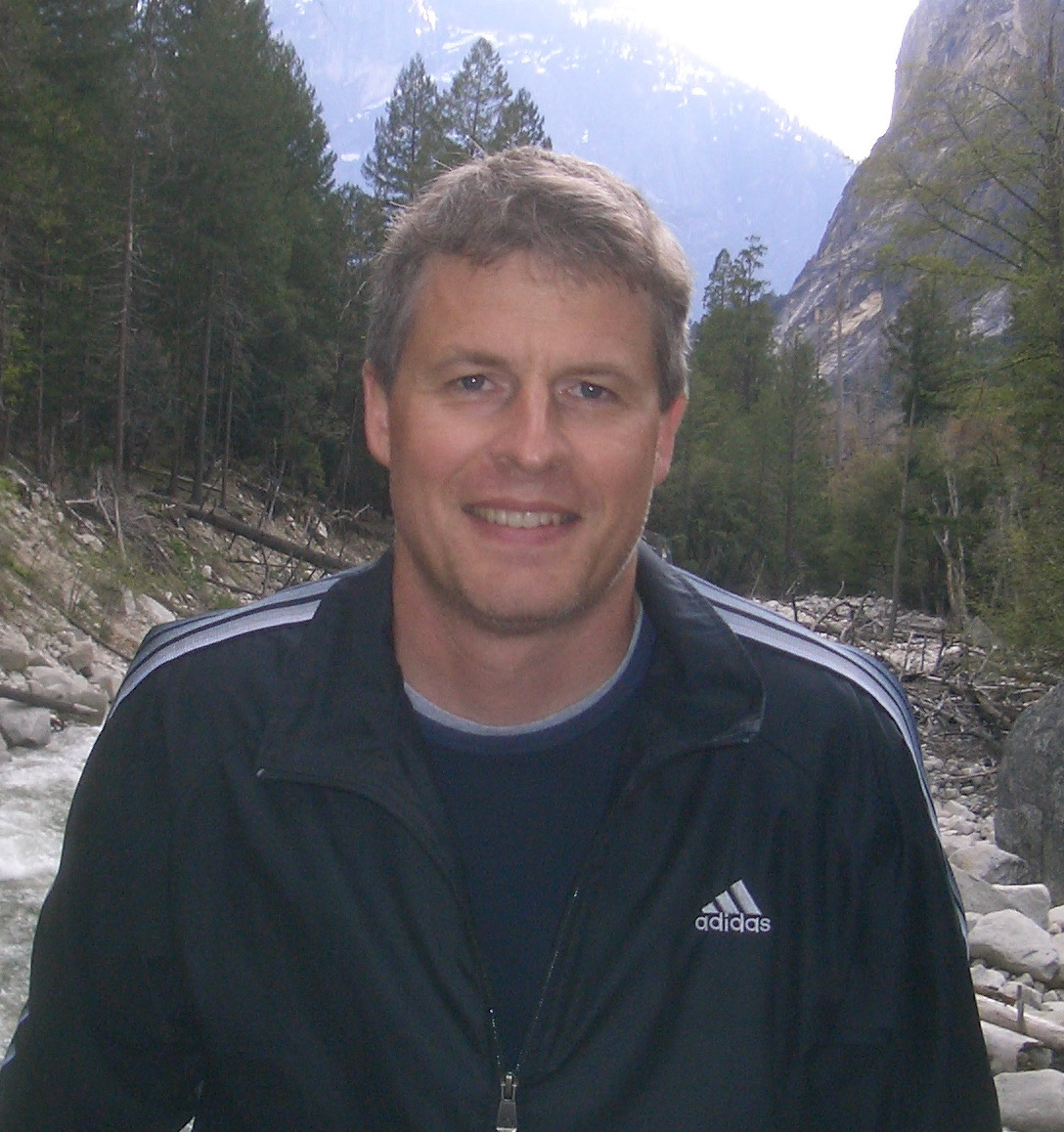
- Thomas Geisser in 2005
- Born: 28 February 1966 (age 60); Wuppertal
- Education: University of Münster
- Awards: Sloan Fellowship 2000, Humboldt Prize 2021
- Scientific career
- Fields: Mathematics
- Workplaces: Rikkyo University
- Thesis: A p-adic analog of Beilinson's conjectures for Hecke characters of imaginary quadratic fields (1994)
- Doctoral advisor: Christopher Deninger
- Website: https://www2.rikkyo.ac.jp/web/geisser/

Thomas Hermann Geisser (born February 28, 1966) is a German mathematician working at Rikkyo University in Tokyo, Japan. He works in the field of arithmetic geometry, motivic cohomology and algebraic K-theory.

== Education ==
From 1985 Geisser studied at Bonn University under the supervision of Günther Harder and obtained a master's degree in 1990. He continued to obtain a PhD under the supervision of Christopher Deninger at the University of Münster; the title of his thesis is "A p-adic analog of Beilinson's conjecture for Hecke characters of imaginary quadratic fields".

== Career ==
Geisser spent three years at Harvard University as a visiting scholar and visiting fellow, respectively. After further stays in Essen, University of Illinois, Urbana-Champaign and Tokyo University, he became assistant professor at the University of Southern California, and was promoted to associate professor in 2002 and professor in 2006.

After visiting Tokyo University again, he became a professor at Nagoya University in 2010, and moved to Rikkyo University in 2015.

He received a Sloan Research Fellowship (2000) and a Humboldt Prize (2021).

He is editor for Documenta Mathematica and managing editor for Commentarii Mathematici Universitatis Sancti Pauli.

== Selected publications ==
- "Algebraic 𝐾-Theory". Proceedings of Symposia in Pure Mathematics. Vol. 67. Providence, Rhode Island: American Mathematical Society. 1999. doi:10.1090/pspum/067. hdl:10852/39333. ISBN 978-0-8218-0927-3. ISSN 2324-707X.
- Geisser, Thomas; Levine, Marc (1 March 2000). "The K -theory of fields in characteristic p". Inventiones Mathematicae. 139 (3). Springer Science and Business Media LLC: 459–493. Bibcode:2000InMat.139..459G. doi:10.1007/s002220050014. ISSN 0020-9910. S2CID 5675613.
- Geisser, T.; Levine, M. (12 January 2001). "The Bloch-Kato conjecture and a theorem of Suslin-Voevodsky". Journal für die reine und angewandte Mathematik (Crelle's Journal). 2001 (530). Walter de Gruyter GmbH. doi:10.1515/crll.2001.006. ISSN 0075-4102.
- Geisser, Thomas (15 May 2006). "Arithmetic cohomology over finite fields and special values of ζ-functions". Duke Mathematical Journal. 133 (1). Duke University Press. arXiv:math/0405164. doi:10.1215/s0012-7094-06-13312-4. ISSN 0012-7094. S2CID 119678716.
- Geisser, Thomas; Hesselholt, Lars (13 May 2006). "Bi-relative algebraic K-theory and topological cyclic homology". Inventiones Mathematicae. 166 (2). Springer Science and Business Media LLC: 359–395. arXiv:math/0409122. Bibcode:2006InMat.166..359G. doi:10.1007/s00222-006-0515-y. ISSN 0020-9910. S2CID 12507964.
- Geisser, Thomas (9 August 2010). "Duality via cycle complexes". Annals of Mathematics. 172 (2): 1095–1127. arXiv:math/0608456. doi:10.4007/annals.2010.172.1095. ISSN 0003-486X. S2CID 59500496.
- Geisser, Thomas H.; Schmidt, Alexander (23 August 2018). "Poitou–Tate duality for arithmetic schemes". Compositio Mathematica. 154 (9): 2020–2044. arXiv:1709.06913. doi:10.1112/s0010437x18007340. ISSN 0010-437X. S2CID 119735104.
- Geisser, Thomas H. (19 July 2018). "COMPARING THE BRAUER GROUP TO THE TATE–SHAFAREVICH GROUP". Journal of the Institute of Mathematics of Jussieu. 19 (3). Cambridge University Press (CUP): 965–970. arXiv:1712.06249. doi:10.1017/s1474748018000294. ISSN 1474-7480. S2CID 119152180.
