= Wiesława Nizioł =

Polish mathematician

Wiesława Krystyna Nizioł
- Education: University of Warsaw; Princeton University
- Scientific career
- Workplaces: University of Utah

Wiesława Krystyna Nizioł (pronounced ['viɛswava 'krɨstɨna 'niziɔw]) is a Polish mathematician, director of research at CNRS, based at Institut mathématique de Jussieu. Her research concerns arithmetic geometry, and in particular p-adic Hodge theory, Galois representations, and p-adic cohomology.

== Education and career ==
Nizioł earned an M.S. in computer science from the University of Warsaw in 1984. She was employed as an assistant professor at the University of Warsaw from 1984 to 1988.

After beginning doctoral studies in computer science at Stanford University under the supervision of Andrew Yao, she followed him to Princeton University, but she switched to mathematics, and received her Ph.D. in 1991 from Princeton University under the supervision of Gerd Faltings.

Thereafter she held temporary positions at Harvard University, the University of Chicago and University of Minnesota before joining the University of Utah in 1996. More recently, she has spent time at the Institute for Advanced Study in 2010 as a visitor and in 2017 and 2024 as a member as well as at the Mathematical Sciences Research Institute in 2014, 2018 and 2023 as part of programs on perfectoid spaces, the homological conjectures and Euler systems, respectively.

She moved to France in 2012 as a directrice de recherches at CNRS, first in École normale supérieure de Lyon and, since 2020 at Institut mathématique de Jussieu in Paris.

== Mathematical work ==
She studies the cohomology of $p$-adic varieties. Her contributions include:

- Comparison theorems, via motivic methods, between de Rham and $p$-adic étale cohomologies of algebraic varieties over $p$-adic fields (proofs of the conjectures $C_{\mathrm{cris}}$ and $C_{\mathrm{st}}$ of Fontaine).
- A definition for $p$-adic algebraic varieties, of a $p$-adic analog (the syntomic cohomology) of the classical Deligne cohomology for algebraic varieties over the real numbers.
- A comparison theorem, via syntomic methods, for $p$-adic analytic varieties, and the computation of the $p$-adic étale cohomology of various $p$-adic symmetric spaces with applications to the $p$-adic local Langlands correspondence.

== Recognition ==
She was an Invited Speaker at the 2006 International Congress of Mathematicians, with a talk entitled "p-adic motivic cohomology in arithmetic". She was elected a member of Academia Europaea in 2021, and as a Fellow of the American Mathematical Society, in the 2025 class of fellows.. In 2025, she became the recipient of the Sierpiński Medal of the University of Warsaw and the Polish Mathematical Society.
