= Siegfried Bosch =

German mathematician

Siegfried Bosch is a German mathematician working in arithmetic geometry, focusing in particular on nonarchimedean analytic geometry.

He completed his Ph.D. in 1967 at the University of Göttingen with a dissertation entitled Endliche analytische Homomorphismen (Finite analytic homomorphisms), and received his habilitation degree in 1972. Since 1974 he has been a professor at the University of Münster.

Bosch is the author of several books in algebra and geometry.

== Books ==
- Bosch, S. (2014). Lectures on formal and rigid geometry. Cham [Switzerland]. ISBN 978-3-319-04417-0. OCLC 889288749.
- Bosch, S. (2013). Algebraic geometry and commutative algebra. London: Springer. ISBN 978-1-4471-4829-6. OCLC 821020969.
- "Algebra". Springer-Lehrbuch. Berlin, Heidelberg: Springer Berlin Heidelberg. 2009. doi:10.1007/978-3-540-92812-6. ISBN 978-3-540-92811-9. ISSN 0937-7433.
- Bosch, Siegfried (2014). Lineare Algebra (in German). Berlin, Heidelberg. ISBN 978-3-642-55260-1. OCLC 885833352.
- Baldassarri, F.; Bosch, S.; Dwork, Bernard M.; Centro internazionale per la ricerca matematica; Congress on "p-adic Analysis" (1990). P-adic analysis : proceedings of the international conference held in Trento, Italy, May 29-June 2, 1989. Berlin: Springer-Verlag. ISBN 978-3-540-46906-3. OCLC 298655850.
- Bosch, Siegfried; Lütkebohmert, Werner; Raynaud, M. (1990). Néron Models. Berlin, Heidelberg: Springer Berlin Heidelberg. ISBN 978-3-642-51438-8. OCLC 851822593.
- Bosch, Siegfried; Güntzer, Ulrich; Remmert, Reinhold (1984). Non-Archimedean analysis a systematic approach to rigid analytic geometry. Berlin. ISBN 3-540-12546-9. OCLC 230556221.
