= Guido Kings =

German mathematician (born 1965)

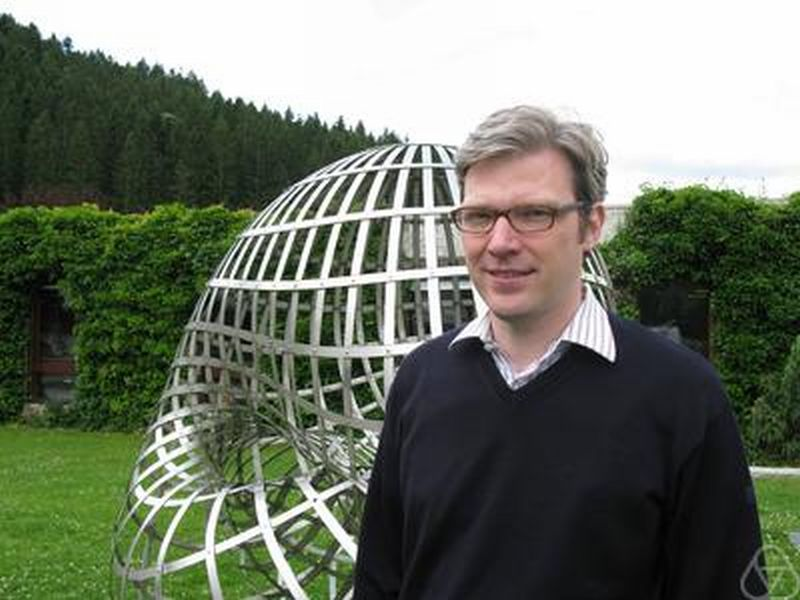
- Guido Kings in 2009 in Oberwolfach
- Born: 1965 (age 60–61)
- Education: University of Bonn, University of Münster
- Website: https://www.uni-regensburg.de/mathematik/mathematik-kings/startseite/index.html

Guido Kings (1965) is a German mathematician working in number theory.

== Education and career ==
Kings studied mathematics at the University of Bonn between 1984 and 1989. He received his doctorate in 1994 and habilitation in 2000 at the University of Münster. In 2001, he held a research professorship at the Max Planck Institute for Mathematics in Bonn. He has been a full professor at the University of Regensburg since 2001.

Kings has done research in arithmetic geometry, the theory of automorphic forms, Iwasawa theory, polylogarithms, and special values of L-functions.

He was the speaker of the research group Algebraic Cycles and L-Functions funded by the German Research Foundation (DFG). Since 2012, he has been the speaker of the collaborative research centre (SFB) Höhere Invarianten – Wechselwirkungen zwischen Arithmetischer Geometrie und Globaler Analysis, also funded by the DFG.

== Awards ==
Together with his coauthor Annette Huber-Klawitter, Kings was the recipient of the award of the Universitätsgesellschaft Münster for young scientists in 1999. Kings and Huber-Klawitter were also invited speakers at the International Congress of Mathematicians in Beijing in 2002.

Since 2012, he has been a Fellow of the American Mathematical Society.

In 2025, Kings and his former student Johannes Sprang received the Frontiers of Science Award for their joint paper Eisenstein-Kronecker classes, integrality of critical values of Hecke L-functions and p-adic interpolation, which appeared in Annals of Mathematics).
