= Vincent Geisser =

French sociologist and political scientist

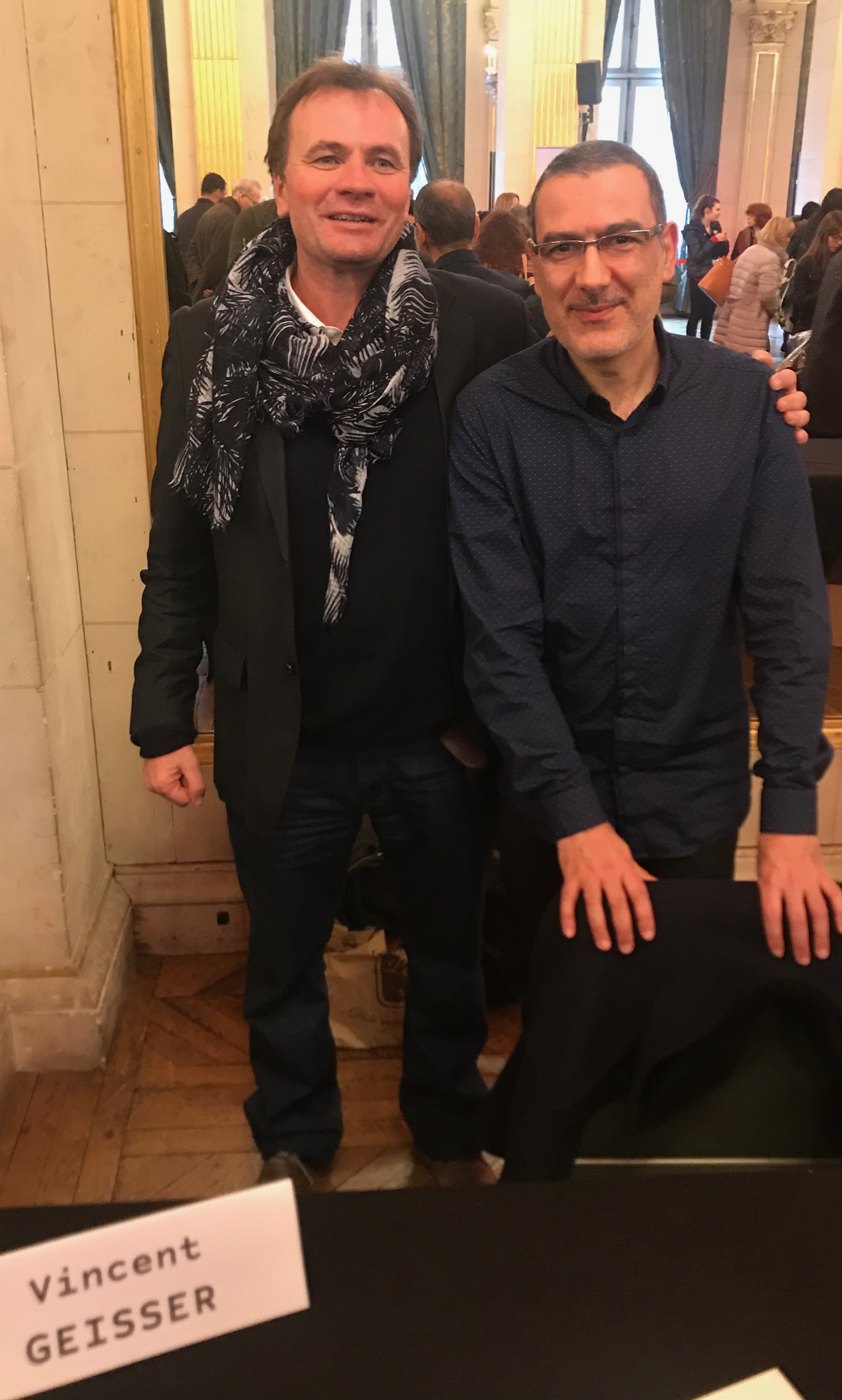
- Geisser to the left
- Born: 15 January 1968 (age 58); Saint-Mandé, France
- Education: Grenoble Institute of Political Studies
- Occupations: Sociologist, political scientist

Vincent Geisser (born 15 January 1968) is a French sociologist and political scientist.

Principal themes of his work and extensive written output include political questions in the Arab world, the role of Islam in France and in Europe more generally, and problems involving discrimination in the French political parties.

== Life ==
Geisser was born at Saint-Mandé, a prosperous quarter on the eastern side of Paris. His father, Robert Geisser (1936–2015), was a police officer: his mother, Geneviève Ourta, was a social worker. His maternal grandfather, Yves Ourta (1912–1989), achieved eminence as a commander of the French Republican Guard and co-director of the National Gendarmerie.

Vincent Geisser holds a diploma from the Grenoble Institute of Political Studies (1989), a doctorate in political science (1995), as well as degrees from the Aix-en-Provence Institute of Political Studies (1991 and 1995) and from the Tunis based International Academy of Constitutional Law (1991).

Between 1995 and 1999 he was sent by the French Ministry of Foreign Affairs to the Research Institute on the contemporary Maghreb "Institut de recherche sur le Maghreb contemporain" / IRMC), an institution sponsored by the French government but based in Tunis. Following this, he has become recognised as an expert on the political regime of President Ben Ali. Since 1999 he has been employed as a researcher by the National Centre for Scientific Research ("Centre national de la recherche scientifique" / CNRS), successively assigned to the Research and Studies Institute on the Arab and Muslim World ("Institut de recherches et d'études sur le monde arabe et musulman" / IREMAM) (1999–2011) based at Aix-en-Provence. After June 2011 he was based at the French Middle-East Institute based in Beirut. Since September 2015 he has been professionally reintegrated into the CNRS itself.

Geisser's public profile was raised in 2009 when he became involved in a dispute with Joseph Illand, a senior engineer at the CNRS. The matter became acrimonious and was picked up by the media, promoted in at least one headline to the status of a Grand Affair ("l'Affaire Geisser"). Intellectuals launched a major media storm, with positions increasingly polarised. The polemicist Caroline Fourest introduced an opinion piece on the matter with the assertion that Geisser was "known for his controversial position in support of radical Islam" ("... connu pour ses prises de position polémiques en faveur de l'islam radical"). Meanwhile, Geisser found himself called before a disciplinary council by the CRNS under circumstances which according to one side in the debate threatened his right to free speech. Parallels were drawn with Nazi book burnings in the 1930s and the 1950s senate hearings associated with Joseph McCarthy.

Geisser is regularly invited to participate in programmes on the broadcast media, notably in the talk show "Toutes les France" presented by Ahmed El Keiy on the France Ô channel. Other channels on which he appears regularly are France Culture and France Info radio channels and the France 24 and TV5Monde television channels. He writes regularly for the Oumma.com website. He is also much involved in public life in his home city by adoption, Marseille, where he participates in numerous debates on the theme of "living together".
