= Ahmed El Keiy =

French journalist

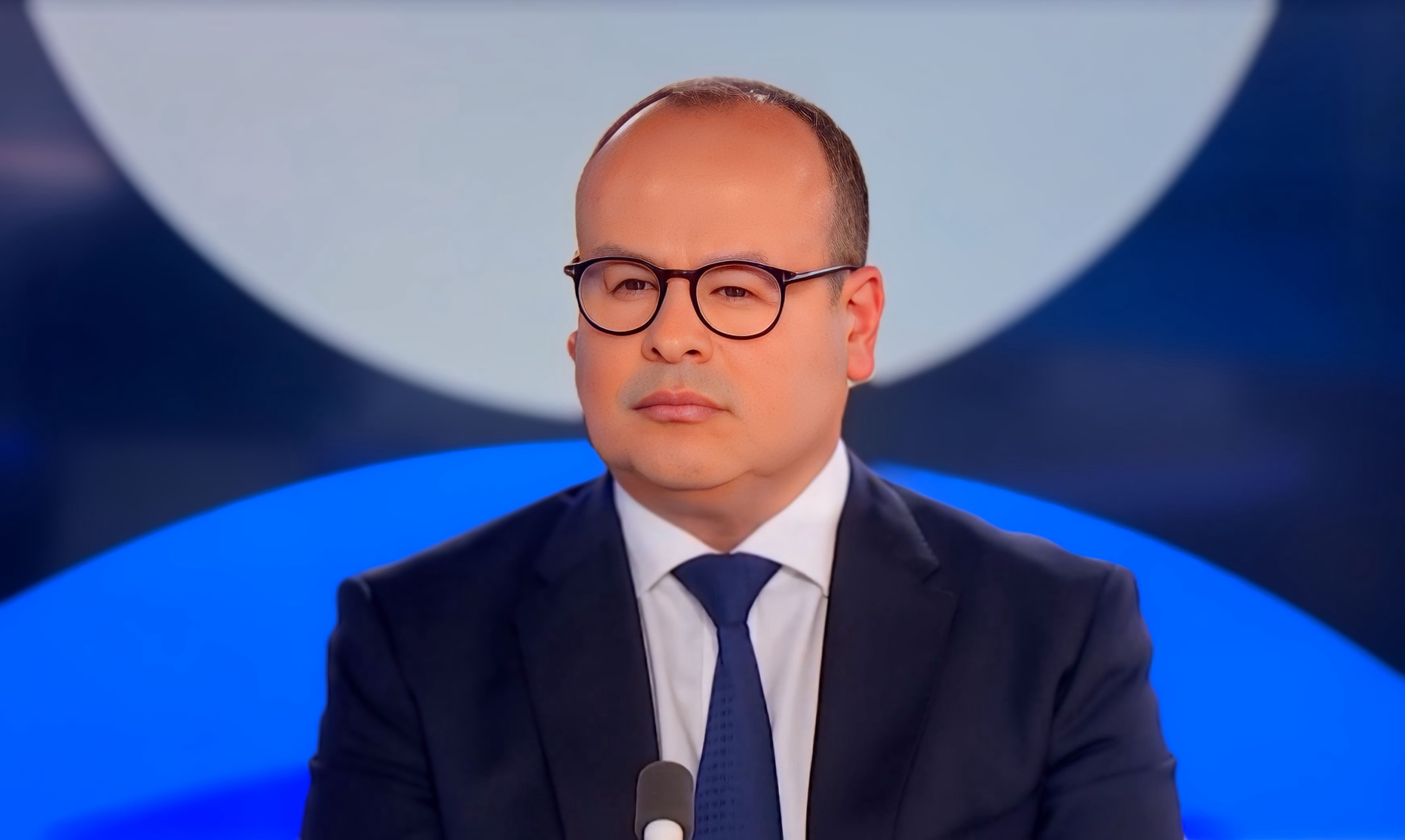
- Born: Cairo, Egypt
- Citizenship: French
- Education: Panthéon-Assas University
- Occupations: Television journalist, media expert, senior executive

Ahmed El Keiy is a Franco-Egyptian journalist and senior executive. Media expert.

== Early life ==
Ahmed El Keiy was born in Cairo and arrived in France at the age of five with his parents after his father was appointed as a senior international civil servant at UNESCO. He obtained the International Baccalauréat at the École Jeannine Manuel (school). He then studied political science and law and graduated from Panthéon-Assas University with a master's degree and an advanced postgraduate diploma in International Law ("diplôme de troisième cycle") in 1993 before joining an international law firm.

He is passionate about theatre and cinema. In 1995 he received an ADAMI "young talent" award at the Cannes International Film Festival. He played the lead role in La Corde ("The Rope"), a short film that won the jury prize at film festivals in Bastia and, outside France, Larissa. He also appeared as an actor in Imentet, un passage par l'Egypte, a production at the Paris Odéon Theatre. He has toured with theatre companies inside and outside France, and taken parts in plays by Chekhov, Goldoni, Beckett, Crommelynck, and others.

== Career ==
El Keiy began writing for various newspapers and magazines, including Le Nouvel Observateur (Paris) and Al-Ahram (Cairo). Fluent in French, English and Arabic, he regularly appears as an expert commentator on anglophone television news programmes, BBC and CNN, particularly during the 2005 riots in the French suburbs.

As a radio and TV journalist, he made his first appearance on French television in 2005. He produced and presented the daily political and social talk show Toutes les France, from 2007 until 2016 which aimed to reflect French diversity while covering and analysing the main national and international issues. During the 2011/12 TV season, with increased resources and larger audience, Toutes Les France transitioned from a daily to a weekly format and was filmed outdoors. Between 2002 and 2009, El Keiy created and hosted Le Forum-debat, the flagship prime-time news debate talk show on Beur FM radio. In 2005, he was appointed Chief Editor and Head of News at the station.

In 2011, he was appointed deputy director of the Arabic language content at the Audiovisuel Extérieur de la France (France 24 news channel and international French radio) and was also the Head of News of the French, English and Arab speaking channels of France 24.

Since 2016, El Keiy has worked as a senior consultant and media strategist. He has advised several national and international institutions. Part of his work is also devoted to media education and training programs in several countries.
