= Syntomic topology =

In algebraic geometry, the syntomic topology is a Grothendieck topology introduced by Fontaine & Messing (1987).

Mazur defined a morphism to be syntomic if it is flat and locally a complete intersection. The syntomic topology is generated by surjective syntomic morphisms of affine schemes.
