= Terence Tao =

Australian and American mathematician (born 1975)

Terence Tao AC FAA FRS
- 陶哲轩
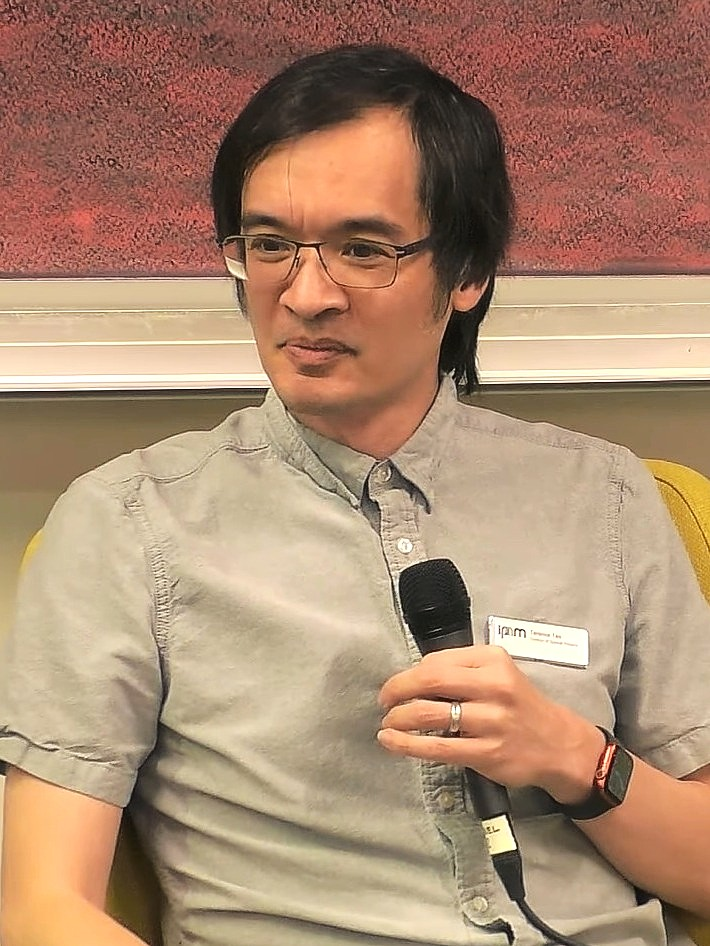
- Tao in 2026
- Born: Terence Chi-Shen Tao; 17 July 1975 (age 51); Adelaide, South Australia, Australia
- Citizenship: Australia; United States
- Education: Flinders University (BSc, MSc); Princeton University (PhD)
- Known for: Green–Tao theorem Erdős discrepancy problem Collatz conjecture Maynard–Tao theorem
- Spouse: Laura Tao
- Children: 2
- Awards: Fields Medal (2006) List: Salem Prize (2000); Bôcher Memorial Prize (2002); Clay Research Award (2003); Australian Mathematical Society Medal (2005); Ostrowski Prize (2005); Levi L. Conant Prize (2005); MacArthur Award (2006); SASTRA Ramanujan Prize (2006); Sloan Fellowship (2006); Fellow of the Royal Society (2007); Alan T. Waterman Award (2008); Onsager Medal (2008); King Faisal International Prize (2010); Nemmers Prize in Mathematics (2010); Pólya Prize (2010); Crafoord Prize (2012); Simons Investigator (2012); Breakthrough Prize in Mathematics (2014); Royal Medal (2014); PROSE Award (2015); Riemann Prize (2019); Princess of Asturias Award (2020); Bolyai Prize (2020); IEEE Jack S. Kilby Signal Processing Medal (2021); Grande Médaille (2023); Alexanderson Award (2023); Companion of the Order of Australia (2026)
- Scientific career
- Fields: Harmonic analysis Combinatorics; Number theory Statistics
- Workplaces: University of California, Los Angeles
- Thesis: Three Regularity Results in Harmonic Analysis (1996)
- Doctoral advisor: Elias M. Stein
- Doctoral students: Monica Vișan, Tim Austin
- Website: University site; Personal blog; Microblog site; YouTube channel

Terence Tao
- Traditional Chinese: 陶哲軒
- Simplified Chinese: 陶哲轩
Transcriptions
Standard Mandarin
- Hanyu Pinyin: Táo Zhéxuān
- IPA: [tʰǎʊ ʈʂɤ̌.ɕyán]
Wu
- Romanization: Dau2 Tseq4 Xi1 (Shanghainese)
Yue: Cantonese
- Yale Romanization: Tòuh Jit-hīn
- Jyutping: Tou4 Zit3 Hin1
- IPA: [tʰɔw˩ tsit̚˧.hin˥]

Terence Chi-Shen Tao AC FAA FRS (Chinese: 陶哲轩; pinyin: Táo Zhéxuān; born 17 July 1975) is an Australian-American mathematician known for his contributions to partial differential equations, combinatorics, harmonic analysis and additive number theory. He was awarded the Fields Medal in 2006 for his contributions to mathematical analysis, discrete mathematics and pure mathematics. He is regarded by many as "the finest mathematician of his generation".

Born to Chinese immigrant parents, Tao was raised in Adelaide, Australia. A child prodigy, he began competing in the International Mathematical Olympiad at age 10 and became the youngest gold medallist in the history of the competition in 1988 at age 13. After earning his doctorate from Princeton University at age 21, he became the youngest full professor in the history of the University of California, Los Angeles (UCLA), where he currently holds the James and Carol Collins Chair in Mathematics.

Tao has made significant contributions to several branches of mathematics, including his collaboration with Ben Green on the Green–Tao theorem, which established that the prime numbers contain arbitrarily long arithmetic progressions, and his work with Emmanuel Candès on the mathematical foundations of compressed sensing. His honours include a MacArthur Fellowship (2007), the Crafoord Prize (2012), the Royal Medal (2014), and the Breakthrough Prize in Mathematics (2015). He was elected a Fellow of the Royal Society in 2007 and appointed a Companion of the Order of Australia in 2026.

== Early life ==
Terence Chi-Shen Tao was born on 17 July 1975 in Adelaide, South Australia. His father, Billy Tao, (Note: Chinese: 陶象國; pinyin: Táo Xiàngguó; Shanghainese: Dau2 Zian3 Goh4) was a Chinese paediatrician from Shanghai, China, while his mother, Grace Leong, (Note: Chinese: 梁蕙蘭; Jyutping: Loeng4 Wai6 Laan4) was born in Hong Kong. His parents met while studying at the University of Hong Kong and emigrated to Australia in 1972. His mother received a first-class honours degree in mathematics and physics from the university. She taught science, physics, chemistry and mathematics at secondary schools in Hong Kong and Australia. Tao is the eldest of three sons, with two younger brothers: Trevor and Nigel. His younger brothers formerly represented Australia at the International Mathematical Olympiad.

=== Mathematics prodigy ===
A child prodigy, Tao exhibited extraordinary mathematical abilities when he was two years old. By the age of six, he had taught himself the programming language BASIC and had written computer programs involving Euclid's algorithm, Fibonacci numbers and prime numbers. He skipped five grades during primary school. He began attending Blackwood High School at age 7. His acceleration differed between academic subjects: at eight, he studied subjects such as English and physical education at Year 8 level, while his mathematics classes were at Year 11 or 12 level.

In July 1983, mathematician M. A. (Ken) Clements conducted an assessment of Tao's abilities and found that Tao could solve advanced algebraic and differential calculus problems despite being only seven years old at the time. Tao achieved a perfect score of 60 out of 60 on the Australian Council for Educational Research's Operations Test administered during the assessment. He then became one of only three children in the history of the Study of Exceptional Talent program at Johns Hopkins University to have achieved a score of 700 or greater on the SAT math section while only 8 years old; Tao scored a 760. Psychologist Julian Stanley, the director of the Study of Mathematically Precocious Youth, said that Tao had the greatest mathematical reasoning ability he had found in years of intensive searching.

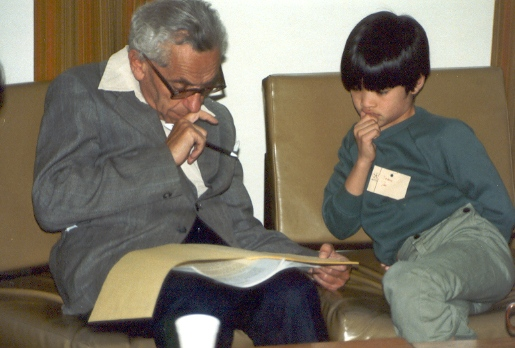
Tao at age 10 with mathematician Paul Erdős in 1985

During a visit to the United States when he was 9 years old, Tao was introduced to mathematicians Enrico Bombieri and Charles Fefferman at the Institute for Advanced Study in Princeton, New Jersey. The two mathematicians assessed his mathematical reasoning by presenting him with problems intended to test his ability to develop solutions independently. Fefferman later recalled being impressed by Tao's ability to propose ideas for unfamiliar mathematical problems. Tao also began participating in the International Mathematical Olympiad (IMO) at the age of ten, representing Australia in three consecutive competitions. He won a bronze medal in 1986, a silver medal in 1987 and a gold medal in 1988. His 1988 victory made him the youngest gold medallist in the competition's history.

=== Higher education ===
By age 9, Tao was already attending university-level mathematics classes at Flinders University. In 1989, at age 14, he began full-time undergraduate studies in mathematics there. In 1990, at age 15, he wrote his first mathematical book, Solving Mathematical Problems: A Personal Perspective, which was published in 1992. He graduated with his Bachelor of Science with honours from Flinders University in December 1991 under the direction of Garth Gaudry. He then earned a Master of Science from the university in August 1992, submitting a thesis titled, Convolution operators generated by right-monogenic and harmonic kernels. For his research, he was awarded its University Medal in 1992.

In 1992, at age 17, Tao was awarded a Fulbright Scholarship, becoming the youngest recipient in the history of the Australian program. He then moved to the United States to begin doctoral studies at Princeton University. As a doctoral student at Princeton, Tao studied under Elias Stein, whose research in harmonic analysis influenced his doctoral work. During his final year at Princeton, Tao received a Sloan Dissertation Fellowship. He earned his Ph.D. from Princeton in June 1996, at age 20. His doctoral dissertation was titled, Three regularity results in harmonic analysis.

== Academic career ==
In 1996, he joined the faculty of the University of California, Los Angeles. In 1999, when he was 24, he was promoted to full professor at UCLA and remains the youngest person ever appointed to that rank by the institution.

He became known for fruitful collaborations and working in multiple specializations; by 2006, Tao had co-authored publications with over 30 other researchers, reaching 68 co-authors by October 2015.

Tao has had a particularly extensive collaboration with British mathematician Ben J. Green; together they proved the Green–Tao theorem, which is well known among both amateur and professional mathematicians. This theorem states that there are arbitrarily long arithmetic progressions of prime numbers. The New York Times described it this way:

In 2004, Dr. Tao, along with Ben Green, a mathematician now at the University of Oxford in England, solved a problem related to the Twin Prime Conjecture by looking at prime number progressions—series of numbers equally spaced. (For example, 3, 7 and 11 constitute a progression of prime numbers with a spacing of 4; the next number in the sequence, 15, is not prime.) Dr. Tao and Dr. Green proved that it is always possible to find, somewhere in the infinity of integers, a progression of prime numbers of equal spacing and any length.

Many other results of Tao have received mainstream attention in the scientific press, including:

- his establishment of finite time blowup for a modification of the Navier–Stokes existence and smoothness Millennium Problem
- his 2015 resolution of the Erdős discrepancy problem, which used entropy estimates within analytic number theory
- his 2019 progress on the Collatz conjecture, in which he proved the probabilistic claim that almost all Collatz orbits attain almost bounded values.

Tao has also resolved or made progress on a number of conjectures. In 2012, Green and Tao announced proofs of the conjectured "orchard-planting problem," which asks for the maximum number of lines through exactly three points in a set of n points in the plane, not all on a line. In 2018, with Brad Rodgers, Tao showed that the de Bruijn–Newman constant, the nonpositivity of which is equivalent to the Riemann hypothesis, is nonnegative. In 2020, Tao proved Sendov's conjecture, concerning the locations of the roots and critical points of a complex polynomial, in the special case of polynomials with sufficiently high degree. In 2024 and 2025, Tao solved problems 121, 442, 135, 685, 69, and 1102 from the Erdős problems website.

=== Recognition ===
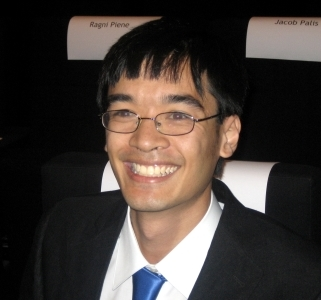
Tao at ICM 2006

Tao has won numerous awards and mathematician honours over the years. He was appointed a Companion of the Order of Australia in the 2026 King's Birthday Honours for "eminent service to the mathematical sciences, to the global mathematics community, and to tertiary education and academia". He is a Fellow of the Royal Society, the Australian Academy of Science (Corresponding Member), the National Academy of Sciences (Foreign member), the American Academy of Arts and Sciences, the American Philosophical Society, and the American Mathematical Society. In 2006 he received the Fields Medal; he was the first Australian, the first UCLA faculty member, and one of the youngest mathematicians to receive the award. He was also awarded the MacArthur Fellowship. In 2014, Tao was selected as one of the inaugural Breakthrough Prize laureates; he felt himself unqualified and unsuccessfully argued that the prize money be distributed among more researchers instead. After receiving the prize money, he used part of it to establish fellowships for students. In 2019, Tao was chosen as the inaugural winner of the Riemann Prize by the Riemann International School of Mathematics at the University of Insubria.

He has been featured in The New York Times, CNN, USA Today, Popular Science, and many other media outlets. Tao was a finalist to become Australian of the Year in 2007. In 2014, Tao received a CTY Distinguished Alumni Honor from Johns Hopkins Center for Gifted and Talented Youth in front of 979 attendees in 8th and 9th grade who were in the same program from which Tao graduated. In 2021, President Joe Biden announced Tao had been selected as one of 30 members of his President's Council of Advisors on Science and Technology, a body bringing together America's most distinguished leaders in science and technology.

As of 2026, Tao had published 560 articles, along with 19 books. He has an Erdős number of 2 and is a highly cited researcher.

Per the New York Times, "many regard Tao as the finest mathematician of his generation." An article by New Scientist writes of his ability:

Such is Tao's reputation that mathematicians now compete to interest him in their problems, and he is becoming a kind of Mr. Fix-it for frustrated researchers. "If you're stuck on a problem, then one way out is to interest Terence Tao," says Professor of Mathematics at Princeton University Charles Fefferman.

British mathematician and Fields medalist Timothy Gowers remarked on Tao's breadth of knowledge:

Tao's mathematical knowledge has an extraordinary combination of breadth and depth: he can write confidently and authoritatively on topics as diverse as partial differential equations, analytic number theory, the geometry of 3-manifolds, nonstandard analysis, group theory, model theory, quantum mechanics, probability, ergodic theory, combinatorics, harmonic analysis, image processing, functional analysis, and many others. Some of these are areas to which he has made fundamental contributions. Others are areas that he appears to understand at the deep intuitive level of an expert despite officially not working in those areas. How he does all this, as well as writing papers and books at a prodigious rate, is a complete mystery. It has been said that David Hilbert was the last person to know all of mathematics, but it is not easy to find gaps in Tao's knowledge, and if you do then you may well find that the gaps have been filled a year later.

== Research contributions ==
=== Dispersive partial differential equations ===
From 2001 to 2010, Tao was part of a collaboration with James Colliander, Markus Keel, Gigliola Staffilani, and Hideo Takaoka. They found a number of novel results, many to do with the well-posedness of weak solutions, for Schrödinger equations, KdV equations, and KdV-type equations.^{[C+03]}

Michael Christ, Colliander, and Tao developed methods of Carlos Kenig, Gustavo Ponce, and Luis Vega to establish ill-posedness of certain Schrödinger and KdV equations for Sobolev data of sufficiently low exponents.^{[CCT03]} In many cases these results were sharp enough to perfectly complement well-posedness results for sufficiently large exponents as due to Bourgain, Colliander−Keel−Staffilani−Takaoka−Tao, and others. Further such notable results for Schrödinger equations were found by Tao in collaboration with Ioan Bejenaru.^{[BT06]}

A particularly notable result of the Colliander−Keel−Staffilani−Takaoka−Tao collaboration established the long-time existence and scattering theory of a power-law Schrödinger equation in three dimensions.^{[C+08]} Their methods, which made use of the scale-invariance of the simple power law, were extended by Tao in collaboration with Monica Vișan and Xiaoyi Zhang to deal with nonlinearities in which the scale-invariance is broken.^{[TVZ07]} Rowan Killip, Tao, and Vișan later made notable progress on the two-dimensional problem in radial symmetry.^{[KTV09]}

An article by Tao in 2001 considered the wave maps equation with two-dimensional domain and spherical range.^{[T01a]} He built upon earlier innovations of Daniel Tataru, who considered wave maps valued in Minkowski space. Tao proved the global well-posedness of solutions with sufficiently small initial data. The fundamental difficulty is that Tao considers smallness relative to the critical Sobolev norm, which typically requires sophisticated techniques. Tao later adapted some of his work on wave maps to the setting of the Benjamin–Ono equation; Alexandru Ionescu and Kenig later obtained improved results with Tao's methods.^{[T04a]}

In 2016, Tao constructed a variant of the Navier–Stokes equations which possess solutions exhibiting irregular behavior in finite time.^{[T16]} Due to structural similarities between Tao's system and the Navier–Stokes equations themselves, it follows that any positive resolution of the Navier–Stokes existence and smoothness problem must take into account the specific nonlinear structure of the equations. In particular, certain previously proposed resolutions of the problem could not be legitimate. Tao speculated that the Navier–Stokes equations might be able to simulate a Turing complete system, and that as a consequence it might be possible to (negatively) resolve the existence and smoothness problem using a modification of his results. However, such results remain (as of 2025) conjectural.

=== Harmonic analysis ===
Bent Fuglede introduced the Fuglede conjecture in the 1970s, positing a tile-based characterisation of those Euclidean domains for which a Fourier ensemble provides a basis of L^{2}. Tao resolved the conjecture in the negative for dimensions larger than 5, based upon the construction of an elementary counterexample to an analogous problem in the setting of finite groups.^{[T04b]}

With Camil Muscalu and Christoph Thiele, Tao considered certain multilinear singular integral operators with the multiplier allowed to degenerate on a hyperplane, identifying conditions which ensure operator continuity relative to L^{p} spaces.^{[MTT02]} This unified and extended earlier notable results of Ronald Coifman, Carlos Kenig, Michael Lacey, Yves Meyer, Elias Stein, and Thiele, among others. Similar problems were analysed by Tao in 2001 in the context of Bourgain spaces, rather than the usual L^{p} spaces.^{[T01b]} Such estimates are used in establishing well-posedness results for dispersive partial differential equations, following famous earlier work of Jean Bourgain, Kenig, Gustavo Ponce, and Luis Vega, among others.

A number of Tao's results deal with "restriction" phenomena in Fourier analysis, which have been widely studied since the time of the articles of Charles Fefferman, Robert Strichartz, and Peter Tomas in the 1970s. Here one studies the operation which restricts input functions on Euclidean space to a submanifold and outputs the product of the Fourier transforms of the corresponding measures. It is of major interest to identify exponents such that this operation is continuous relative to L^{p} spaces. Such multilinear problems originated in the 1990s, including in notable work of Jean Bourgain, Sergiu Klainerman, and Matei Machedon. In collaboration with Ana Vargas and Luis Vega, Tao made some foundational contributions to the study of the bilinear restriction problem, establishing new exponents and drawing connections to the linear restriction problem. They also found analogous results for the bilinear Kakeya problem which is based upon the X-ray transform instead of the Fourier transform.^{[TVV98]} In 2003, Tao adapted ideas developed by Thomas Wolff for bilinear restriction to conical sets into the setting of restriction to quadratic hypersurfaces.^{[T03]} The multilinear setting for these problems was further developed by Tao in collaboration with Jonathan Bennett and Anthony Carbery; their work was extensively used by Bourgain and Larry Guth in deriving estimates for general oscillatory integral operators.^{[BCT06]}

=== Compressed sensing and statistics ===
In collaboration with Emmanuel Candes and Justin Romberg, Tao has made notable contributions to the field of compressed sensing. In mathematical terms, most of their results identify settings in which a convex optimisation problem correctly computes the solution of an optimisation problem which seems to lack a computationally tractable structure. These problems are of the nature of finding the solution of an underdetermined linear system with the minimal possible number of nonzero entries, referred to as "sparsity". Around the same time, David Donoho considered similar problems from the alternative perspective of high-dimensional geometry.

Motivated by striking numerical experiments, Candes, Romberg, and Tao first studied the case where the matrix is given by the discrete Fourier transform.^{[CRT06a]} Candes and Tao abstracted the problem and introduced the notion of a "restricted linear isometry," which is a matrix that is quantitatively close to an isometry when restricted to certain subspaces.^{[CT05]} They showed that it is sufficient for either exact or optimally approximate recovery of sufficiently sparse solutions. Their proofs, which involved the theory of convex duality, were markedly simplified in collaboration with Romberg, to use only linear algebra and elementary ideas of harmonic analysis.^{[CRT06b]} These ideas and results were later improved by Candes. Candes and Tao also considered relaxations of the sparsity condition, such as power-law decay of coefficients.^{[CT06]} They complemented these results by drawing on a large corpus of past results in random matrix theory to show that, according to the Gaussian ensemble, a large number of matrices satisfy the restricted isometry property.^{[CT06]}

In 2007, Candes and Tao introduced a novel statistical estimator for linear regression, which they called the "Dantzig selector." They proved a number of results on its success as an estimator and model selector, roughly in parallel to their earlier work on compressed sensing.^{[CT07]} A number of other authors have since studied the Dantzig selector, comparing it to similar objects such as the statistical lasso introduced in the 1990s. Trevor Hastie, Robert Tibshirani, and Jerome H. Friedman conclude that it is "somewhat unsatisfactory" in a number of cases. Nonetheless, it remains of significant interest in the statistical literature.

In 2009, Candes and Benjamin Recht considered an analogous problem for recovering a matrix from knowledge of only a few of its entries and the information that the matrix is of low rank. They formulated the problem in terms of convex optimisation, studying minimisation of the nuclear norm. Candes and Tao, in 2010, developed further results and techniques for the same problem.^{[CT10]} Improved results were later found by Recht. Similar problems and results have also been considered by a number of other authors.

=== Random matrices ===
In the 1950s, Eugene Wigner initiated the study of random matrices and their eigenvalues. Wigner studied the case of hermitian and symmetric matrices, proving a "semicircle law" for their eigenvalues. In 2010, Tao and Van Vu made a major contribution to the study of non-symmetric random matrices. They showed that if n is large and the entries of a n × n matrix A are selected randomly according to any fixed probability distribution of expectation 0 and standard deviation 1, then the eigenvalues of A will tend to be uniformly scattered across the disk of radius n^{1/2} around the origin; this can be made precise using the language of measure theory.^{[TV10]} This gave a proof of the long-conjectured circular law, which had previously been proved in weaker formulations by many other authors. In Tao and Vu's formulation, the circular law becomes an immediate consequence of a "universality principle" stating that the distribution of the eigenvalues can depend only on the average and standard deviation of the given component-by-component probability distribution, thereby providing a reduction of the general circular law to a calculation for specially-chosen probability distributions.

In 2011, Tao and Vu established a "four moment theorem", which applies to random hermitian matrices whose components are independently distributed, each with average 0 and standard deviation 1, and which are exponentially unlikely to be large (as for a Gaussian distribution). If one considers two such random matrices which agree on the average value of any quadratic polynomial in the diagonal entries and on the average value of any quartic polynomial in the off-diagonal entries, then Tao and Vu show that the expected value of a large number of functions of the eigenvalues will also coincide, up to an error which is uniformly controllable by the size of the matrix and which becomes arbitrarily small as the size of the matrix increases.^{[TV11]} Similar results were obtained around the same time by László, Erdős, Horng-Tzer Yau, and Jun Yin.

=== Analytic number theory and arithmetic combinatorics ===
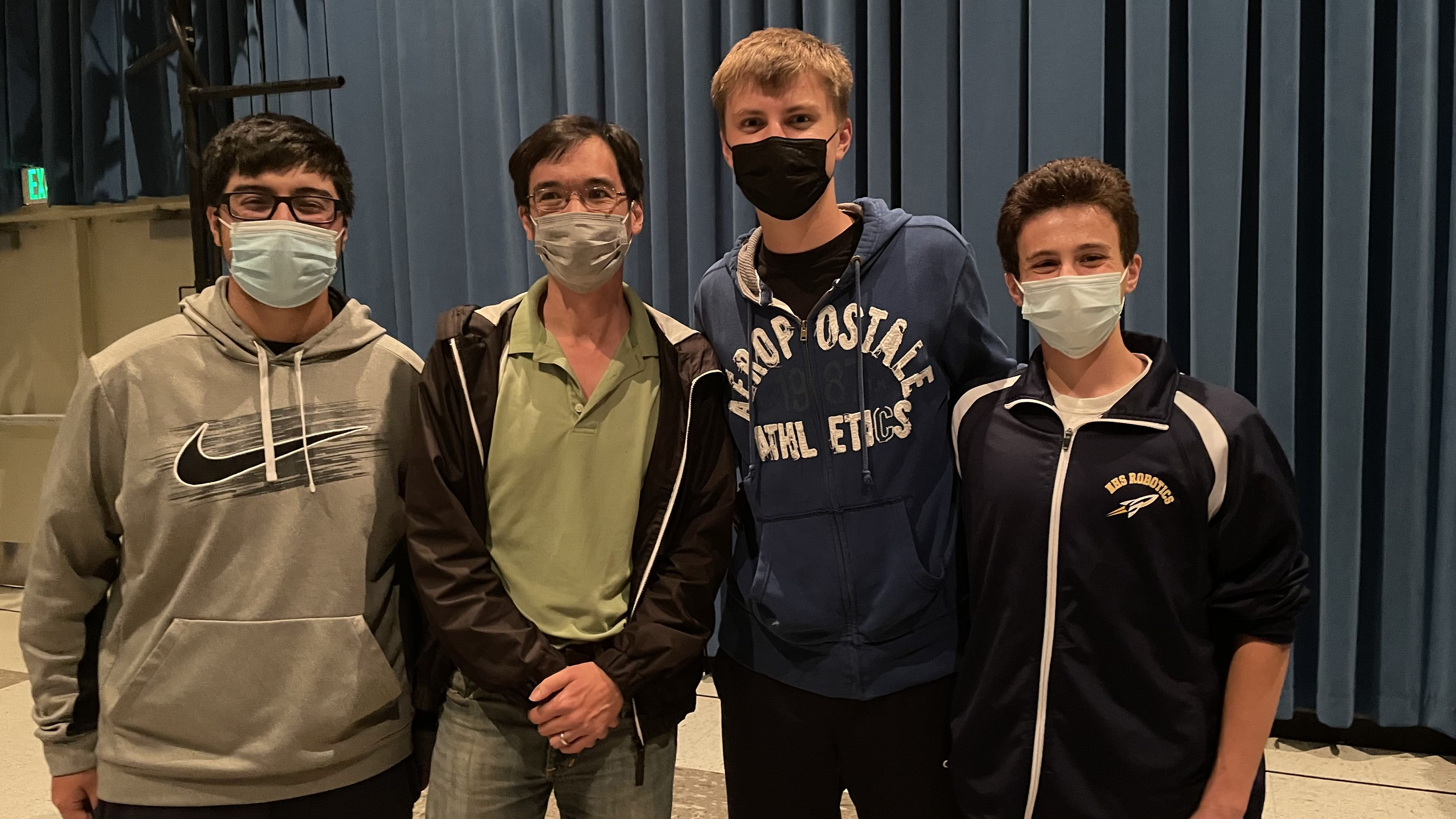
Tao (second from left) with UCLA undergraduate students in 2021

In 2004, Tao, together with Jean Bourgain and Nets Katz, studied the additive and multiplicative structure of subsets of finite fields of prime order.^{[BKT04]} It is well known that there are no nontrivial subrings of such a field. Bourgain, Katz, and Tao provided a quantitative formulation of this fact, showing that for any subset of such a field, the number of sums and products of elements of the subset must be quantitatively large, as compared to the size of the field and the size of the subset itself. Improvements of their result were later given by Bourgain, Alexey Glibichuk, and Sergei Konyagin.

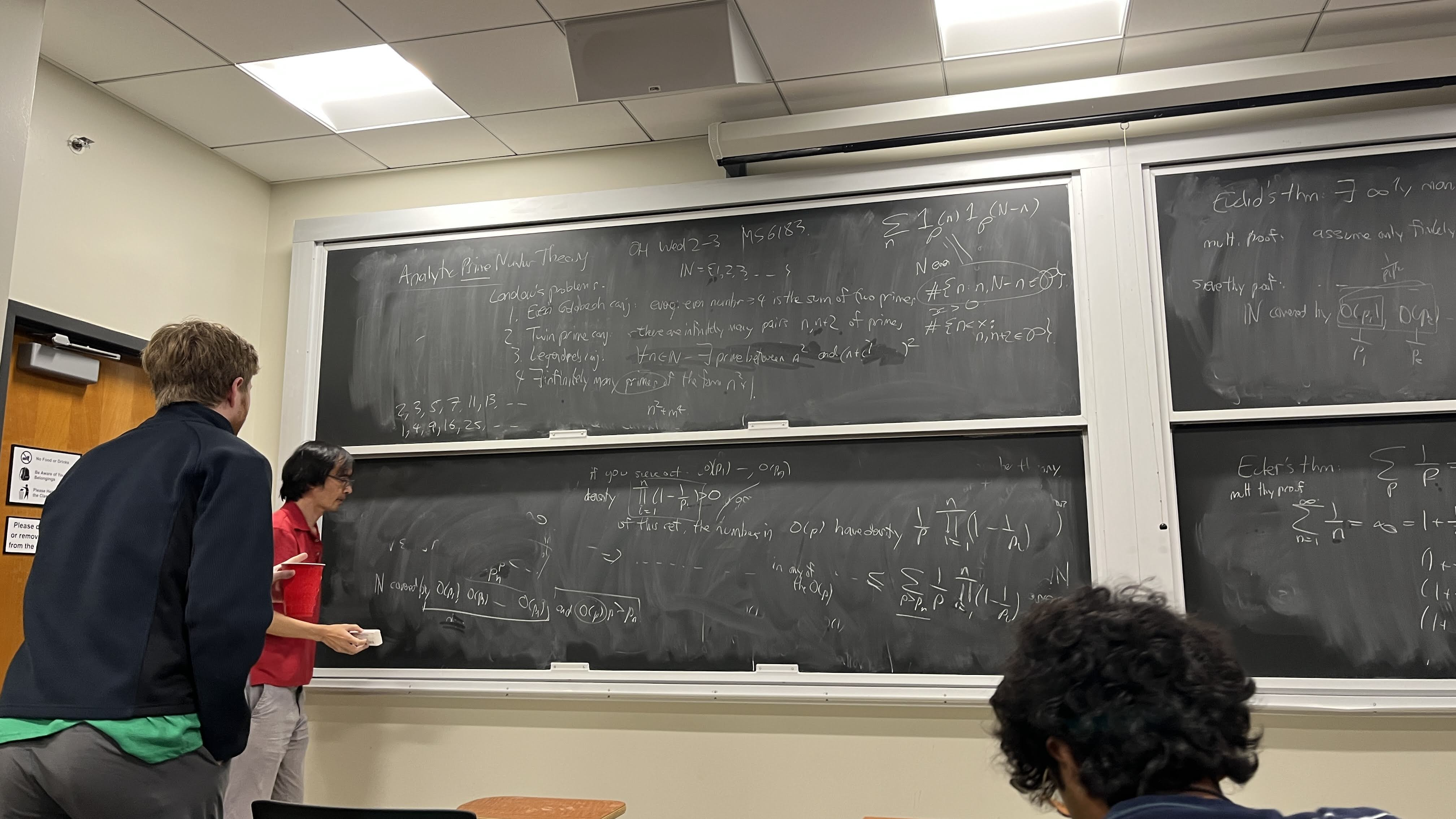
Tao teaching analytic number theory at UCLA in January 2025

Tao and Ben Green proved the existence of arbitrarily long arithmetic progressions in the prime numbers; this result is generally referred to as the Green–Tao theorem, and is among Tao's most well-known results.^{[GT08]} The source of Green and Tao's arithmetic progressions is Endre Szemerédi's 1975 theorem on existence of arithmetic progressions in certain sets of integers. Green and Tao showed that one can use a "transference principle" to extend the validity of Szemerédi's theorem to further sets of integers. The Green–Tao theorem then arises as a special case, although it is not trivial to show that the prime numbers satisfy the conditions of Green and Tao's extension of the Szemerédi theorem.

In 2010, Green and Tao gave a multilinear extension of Dirichlet's celebrated theorem on arithmetic progressions. Given a k × n matrix A and a k × 1 matrix v whose components are all integers, Green and Tao give conditions on when there exist infinitely many n × 1 matrices x such that all components of Ax + v are prime numbers.^{[GT10]} The proof of Green and Tao was incomplete, as it was conditioned upon unproven conjectures. Those conjectures were proved in later work of Green, Tao, and Tamar Ziegler.^{[GTZ12]}

== Views on artificial intelligence in mathematics ==
Tao has become one of the most prominent mathematicians writing and speaking about the use of artificial intelligence (AI) and proof assistants in mathematical research; Quanta Magazine has described him as an evangelist for machine-assisted mathematics. He surveyed the area in the expository article "Machine-Assisted Proof" in the Notices of the American Mathematical Society, has served since 2024 on the advisory committee of the XTX Markets Artificial Intelligence Mathematical Olympiad Prize, and co-chaired a working group on generative AI during his term on the President's Council of Advisors on Science and Technology.

=== Formalisation and large-scale collaboration ===
Having earlier led several Polymath Project collaborations, Tao concluded that open collaboration at scale was constrained by the need for a human organiser to check every contribution, and that automated verification could remove that bottleneck. He began learning the Lean proof assistant in late 2023, and in November of that year launched a crowdsourced formalisation of the polynomial Freiman–Ruzsa conjecture he had proved with Timothy Gowers, Ben Green and Freddie Manners; volunteers completed it in roughly three weeks, with Tao writing little of the Lean code himself.

In September 2024, he launched the Equational Theories Project, a pilot in machine-assisted collaboration that set out to determine every implication among the 4,694 simplest equational laws on magmas. Combining human-written and automatically generated proofs, all validated in Lean, the project resolved all 22,028,942 implications by April 2025 and turned up new magma constructions in the process. Tao regarded it less as a result in itself than as a demonstration of an "experimental" mode of mathematics analogous to experimental physics, in which large volumes of machine-checked work complement rather than replace conventional theory.

=== Assessments of AI capability ===
Tao's published assessments have shifted substantially over time. In September 2024, after testing OpenAI's o1 model on research problems, he likened it to a "mediocre, but not completely incompetent" graduate student that reached correct answers only under heavy prompting. Interviewed by The Atlantic the following month, he drew a sharper distinction: graduate students learn from correction, whereas a model told that its approach fails may adjust briefly and then revert. He nonetheless described a prospective "industrial-scale mathematics" in which AI acts less as an independent creative collaborator than as an accelerant for human hypotheses, and compared the situation to chess, where engines surpassed players without diminishing the game.

By 2026 he was reporting substantive assistance in his own research. His paper on local Bernstein theory and lower bounds for Lebesgue constants credits a language model with supplying a duality argument, based on the Nevanlinna two-constant theorem, for an inequality he had not been able to prove himself, and records that an AI system had earlier confirmed the inequality numerically. He has coupled this with a standing caution: because most mathematics is written informally rather than machine-checked, AI can produce arguments that read as polished while concealing an unsound step, and formal verification is the natural corrective.

=== Mathematics in the age of AI ===
Tao delivered a public lecture titled "Mathematics in the Age of AI" at the 2026 International Congress of Mathematicians in Philadelphia in July 2026, subsequently written up as an essay for the congress proceedings. Rather than debating how capable such tools will become, the essay conditions on the assumption that research-level capability will arrive and asks instead what the goals and values of mathematical research actually are, using problem solving as a case study.

Tao distinguished several stages of problem solving and argued that AI has affected them unevenly. Producing and verifying a proof is the stage machines already handle well; the difficulty arises at the stages that follow, in which a result must be explained clearly enough to be communicated, accepted and used by other mathematicians, and eventually canonicalised into textbooks—the point, he argued, at which a field becomes usable by engineers and physicists, and the very corpus on which AI systems were trained. He warned that machine-generated proofs running to a hundred thousand lines can be verified without anyone understanding them, including whoever wrote the prompt, and suggested that mathematicians will need to place more weight on describing process rather than letting outcomes speak for themselves, since outcomes are now automatable and current tools are opaque about how they reach them. He closed by urging the discipline to take the initiative in deciding where AI should be used: "We set the rules on what's acceptable or not", and not leave that to external actors.

=== Joint declaration on AI in mathematics ===
On 11 September 2026, Tao published on his blog What's new a joint declaration titled "A Severe Misalignment of AI in Mathematics", signed by 25 Fields Medallists spanning award years from 1978 to 2026, including Pierre Deligne, Maxim Kontsevich, Peter Scholze, Maryna Viazovska, James Maynard and Yu Deng. Tao wrote that the text grew out of roughly a week of discussion among the signatories, and that the group had forgone the broader consultative process used for the earlier Leiden declaration because it judged the situation urgent. The full text is hosted at mathandai.org, which invites further endorsements from academics.

The declaration accepts that the mathematical capabilities of large language models have improved sharply in recent months, to the point of settling significant open problems, but argues that the use of such problems as capability benchmarks by AI companies is detrimental to the discipline. It holds that problem solving is a proxy for mathematics' primary aim of conceptual understanding and insight, and that mass production of true-or-false statements at increasing speed risks displacing the slower human processes—talks, discussion, simplification and eventual textbook exposition—through which results enter the mathematical canon. It also raises attribution and plagiarism concerns about results announced before a proper writeup isolating new methods and citing prior work, and presents the situation as one instance of a broader misalignment confronting other scientific and creative professions.

The declaration followed reports days earlier that OpenAI had claimed a proof related to one of the Millennium Prize Problems, and was reported by The Economist.

== Views on U.S. research policy ==
On August 18, 2025, Terence Tao wrote an article to express his disapproval of United States president Donald Trump's policies cutting research funding, which greatly affected his mathematics research. As a result of such funding cuts, two of Terence Tao's research grants were suspended by the National Science Foundation as part of a broader federal action that affected his university, UCLA. One of the grants directly supported his research at UCLA, while another supported UCLA's Institute for Pure and Applied Mathematics (IPAM) where Tao oversees research projects.

Tao has argued that these cuts have serious consequences for the recruitment of academic talent and hinder research advancement. Although his research is in pure mathematics, it potentially could lay foundations in applied mathematics supporting developments in areas such as cryptography and cybersecurity. Also, previous collaborative research of Tao's in signal processing has greatly accelerated MRI scan speed.

== Personal life ==
Tao speaks Cantonese but cannot write Chinese. Tao is married to Laura Tao, an electrical engineer at NASA's Jet Propulsion Laboratory. They live in Los Angeles, California, and have two children.

== Notable awards ==
Terence Tao has won numerous awards for his work. He won the Fields Medal, one of the highest awards of mathematics, in 2006.

* 2000 – Salem Prize for:

"his work in L^{p} harmonic analysis and on related questions in geometric measure theory and partial differential equations."

- 2002 – Bôcher Memorial Prize for:

Global regularity of wave maps I. Small critical Sobolev norm in high dimensions. Internat. Math. Res. Notices (2001), no. 6, 299–328.
Global regularity of wave maps II. Small energy in two dimensions. Comm. Math. Phys. 2244 (2001), no. 2, 443–544.

in addition to "his remarkable series of papers, written in collaboration with J. Colliander, M. Keel, G. Staffilani, and H. Takaoka, on global regularity in optimal Sobolev spaces for KdV and other equations, as well as his many deep contributions to Strichartz and bilinear estimates."

- 2003 – Clay Research Award for:

his restriction theorems in Fourier analysis, his work on wave maps, his global existence theorems for KdV-type equations, and for his solution with Allen Knutson of Horn's conjecture

- 2005 – Levi L. Conant Prize (with Allen Knutson) for:

their expository article "Honeycombs and Sums of Hermitian Matrices" (Notices of the AMS. 48 (2001), 175–186.)

- 2006 – Fields Medal for:

"his contributions to partial differential equations, combinatorics, harmonic analysis and additive number theory"

- 2006 – SASTRA Ramanujan Prize
- 2007 – Fellow of the Royal Society
- 2008 – Alan T. Waterman Award for:

"his surprising and original contributions to many fields of mathematics, including number theory, differential equations, algebra, and harmonic analysis"

- 2008 – Onsager Medal for:

"his combination of mathematical depth, width and volume in a manner unprecedented in contemporary mathematics". His Lars Onsager lecture was entitled "Structure and randomness in the prime numbers" at NTNU, Norway.

- 2009 – Inducted into the American Academy of Arts and Sciences
- 2010 – King Faisal International Prize
- 2010 – Nemmers Prize in Mathematics
- 2010 – Polya Prize (with Emmanuel Candès)
- 2012 – Crafoord Prize
- 2012 – Simons Investigator
- 2015 – PROSE award in the category of "Mathematics" for:

"Hilbert's Fifth Problem and Related Topics" ISBN 978-1-4704-1564-8

- 2019 – Riemann Prize
- 2019 – The Carnegie Corporation of New York honored Tao with 2019 Great Immigrant Award.
- 2020 – Princess of Asturias Award for Technical and Scientific Research, with Emmanuel Candès, for their work on compressed sensing
- 2020 – Bolyai Prize
- 2021 – IEEE Jack S. Kilby Signal Processing Medal
- 2022 – Global Australian of the Year (Advance Global Australians; Advance.org)
- 2022 – Grande Médaille
- 2023 – Alexanderson Award (with Kaisa Matomäki, Maksym Radziwiłł, Joni Teräväinen, and Tamar Ziegler) for:

Higher uniformity of bounded multiplicative functions in short intervals on average. Annals of Mathematics, Second Series (2023), 197(2): 739–857.

- 2025 – James Madison medal
- 2026 – Companion of the Order of Australia

== Major publications ==
=== Textbooks ===
- — (2006). Solving mathematical problems. A personal perspective (Second edition of 1992 original ed.). Oxford University Press. ISBN 978-0-19-920560-8. MR 2265113. Zbl 1098.00006.
- — (2006). Nonlinear dispersive equations. Local and global analysis. CBMS Regional Conference Series in Mathematics. Vol. 106. Providence, RI: American Mathematical Society. doi:10.1090/cbms/106. ISBN 0-8218-4143-2. MR 2233925. Zbl 1106.35001.
- —; Vu, Van H. (2006). Additive combinatorics. Cambridge Studies in Advanced Mathematics. Vol. 105. Cambridge University Press. ISBN 978-0-521-85386-6. MR 2289012. Zbl 1127.11002.
- — (2008). Structure and randomness. Pages from year one of a mathematical blog. Providence, RI: American Mathematical Society. doi:10.1090/mbk/059. ISBN 978-0-8218-4695-7. MR 2459552. Zbl 1245.00024.
- — (2009). Poincaré's legacies, pages from year two of a mathematical blog. Part I. Providence, RI: American Mathematical Society. doi:10.1090/mbk/066. ISBN 978-0-8218-4883-8. MR 2523047. Zbl 1171.00003.
- — (2009). Poincaré's legacies, pages from year two of a mathematical blog. Part II. Providence, RI: American Mathematical Society. doi:10.1090/mbk/067. ISBN 978-0-8218-4885-2. MR 2541289. Zbl 1175.00010.
- — (2010). An epsilon of room, I: real analysis. Pages from year three of a mathematical blog. Graduate Studies in Mathematics. Vol. 117. Providence, RI: American Mathematical Society. doi:10.1090/gsm/117. ISBN 978-0-8218-5278-1. MR 2760403. Zbl 1216.46002.
- — (2010). An epsilon of room, II. Pages from year three of a mathematical blog. Providence, RI: [American Mathematical Society. doi:10.1090/mbk/077. ISBN 978-0-8218-5280-4. MR 2780010. Zbl 1218.00001.
- — (2011). An introduction to measure theory. Graduate Studies in Mathematics. Vol. 126. Providence, RI: American Mathematical Society. doi:10.1090/gsm/126. ISBN 978-0-8218-6919-2. MR 2827917. Zbl 1231.28001.
- — (2012). Topics in random matrix theory. Graduate Studies in Mathematics. Vol. 132. Providence, RI: American Mathematical Society. doi:10.1090/gsm/132. ISBN 978-0-8218-7430-1. MR 2906465. Zbl 1256.15020.
- — (2012). Higher order Fourier analysis. Graduate Studies in Mathematics. Vol. 142. Providence, RI: American Mathematical Society. doi:10.1090/gsm/142. ISBN 978-0-8218-8986-2. MR 2931680. Zbl 1277.11010.
- — (2013). Compactness and contradiction. Providence, RI: American Mathematical Society. doi:10.1090/mbk/081. ISBN 978-0-8218-9492-7. MR 3026767. Zbl 1276.00007.
- — (2014) [2006]. Analysis. I. Texts and Readings in Mathematics. Vol. 37 (3rd ed.). New Delhi: Hindustan Book Agency. ISBN 978-93-80250-64-9. MR 3309891. Zbl 1300.26002.
- — (2014) [2006]. Analysis. II. Texts and Readings in Mathematics. Vol. 38 (3rd ed.). New Delhi: Hindustan Book Agency. ISBN 978-93-80250-65-6. MR 3310023. Zbl 1300.26003.
- — (2014). Hilbert's fifth problem and related topics. Graduate Studies in Mathematics. Vol. 153. Providence, RI: American Mathematical Society. doi:10.1090/gsm/153. ISBN 978-1-4704-1564-8. MR 3237440. Zbl 1298.22001.
- — (2015). Expansion in finite simple groups of Lie type. Graduate Studies in Mathematics. Vol. 164. Providence, RI: American Mathematical Society. doi:10.1090/gsm/164. ISBN 978-1-4704-2196-0. MR 3309986. S2CID 118288443. Zbl 1336.20015.
- — (2022). Analysis I. Texts and Readings in Mathematics. Vol. 37 (4th ed.). Springer Singapore. ISBN 978-981-19-7261-4.
- — (2022). Analysis II. Texts and Readings in Mathematics. Vol. 38 (4th ed.). Springer Singapore. ISBN 978-981-19-7284-3.

=== Research articles ===
KT98.	Keel, Markus; Tao, Terence (1998). "Endpoint Strichartz estimates". American Journal of Mathematics. 120 (5): 955–980. Bibcode:1998AmJM..120..955K. doi:10.1353/ajm.1998.0039. JSTOR 25098630. MR 1646048. S2CID 13012479. Zbl 0922.35028.

TVV98.	Tao, Terence; Vargas, Ana; Vega, Luis (1998). "A bilinear approach to the restriction and Kakeya conjectures". Journal of the American Mathematical Society. 11 (4): 967–1000. arXiv:math/9807163. doi:10.1090/S0894-0347-98-00278-1. MR 1625056. Zbl 0924.42008.

KT99.	Knutson, Allen; Tao, Terence (1999). "The honeycomb model of $GL_n(\mathbb{C})$ tensor products. I. Proof of the saturation conjecture". Journal of the American Mathematical Society. 12 (4): 1055–1090. arXiv:math/9807160. doi:10.1090/S0894-0347-99-00299-4. MR 1671451. Zbl 0944.05097.

C+01.	Colliander, J.; Keel, M.; Staffilani, G.; Takaoka, H.; Tao, T. (2001). "Global well-posedness for Schrödinger equations with derivative". SIAM Journal on Mathematical Analysis. 33 (3): 649–669. arXiv:math/0101263. doi:10.1137/S0036141001384387. MR 1871414. Zbl 1002.35113.

T01a.	Tao, Terence (2001). "Global regularity of wave maps. II. Small energy in two dimensions". Communications in Mathematical Physics. 224 (2): 443–544. arXiv:math/0011173. Bibcode:2001CMaPh.224..443T. doi:10.1007/PL00005588. MR 1869874. S2CID 119634411. Zbl 1020.35046. (Erratum: )

T01b.	Tao, Terence (2001). "Multilinear weighted convolution of L^{2}-functions, and applications to nonlinear dispersive equations". American Journal of Mathematics. 123 (5): 839–908. arXiv:math/0005001. doi:10.1353/ajm.2001.0035. JSTOR 25099087. MR 1854113. S2CID 984131. Zbl 0998.42005.

C+02a.	Colliander, J.; Keel, M.; Staffilani, G.; Takaoka, H.; Tao, T. (2002). "A refined global well-posedness result for Schrödinger equations with derivative". SIAM Journal on Mathematical Analysis. 34 (1): 64–86. arXiv:math/0110026. doi:10.1137/S0036141001394541. MR 1950826. S2CID 9007785. Zbl 1034.35120.

C+02b.	Colliander, J.; Keel, M.; Staffilani, G.; Takaoka, H.; Tao, T. (2002). "Almost conservation laws and global rough solutions to a nonlinear Schrödinger equation". Mathematical Research Letters. 9 (5–6): 659–682. arXiv:math/0203218. doi:10.4310/MRL.2002.v9.n5.a9. MR 1906069. Zbl 1152.35491.

MTT02.	Muscalu, Camil; Tao, Terence; Thiele, Christoph (2002). "Multi-linear operators given by singular multipliers". Journal of the American Mathematical Society. 15 (2): 469–496. arXiv:math/9910039. doi:10.1090/S0894-0347-01-00379-4. MR 1887641. Zbl 0994.42015.

CCT03.	Christ, Michael; Colliander, James; Tao, Terrence (2003). "Asymptotics, frequency modulation, and low regularity ill-posedness for canonical defocusing equations". American Journal of Mathematics. 125 (6): 1235–1293. arXiv:math/0203044. doi:10.1353/ajm.2003.0040. MR 2018661. S2CID 11001499. Zbl 1048.35101.

C+03.	Colliander, J.; Keel, M.; Staffilani, G.; Takaoka, H.; Tao, T. (2003). "Sharp global well-posedness for KdV and modified KdV on $\mathbb{R}$ and $\mathbb{T}$". Journal of the American Mathematical Society. 16 (3): 705–749. arXiv:math/0110045. doi:10.1090/S0894-0347-03-00421-1. MR 1969209. Zbl 1025.35025.

T03.	Tao, T. (2003). "A sharp bilinear restrictions estimate for paraboloids". Geometric and Functional Analysis. 13 (6): 1359–1384. arXiv:math/0210084. doi:10.1007/s00039-003-0449-0. MR 2033842. S2CID 15873489. Zbl 1068.42011.

BKT04.	Bourgain, J.; Katz, N.; Tao, T. (2004). "A sum-product estimate in finite fields, and applications". Geometric and Functional Analysis. 14 (1): 27–57. arXiv:math/0301343. doi:10.1007/s00039-004-0451-1. MR 2053599. S2CID 14097626. Zbl 1145.11306.

C+04.	Colliander, J.; Keel, M.; Staffilani, G.; Takaoka, H.; Tao, T. (2004). "Global existence and scattering for rough solutions of a nonlinear Schrödinger equation on ℝ^{3}". Communications on Pure and Applied Mathematics. 57 (8): 987–1014. arXiv:math/0301260. doi:10.1002/cpa.20029. MR 2053757. S2CID 16423475. Zbl 1060.35131.

KTW04.	Knutson, Allen; Tao, Terence; Woodward, Christopher (2004). "The honeycomb model of $GL_n(\mathbb{C})$ tensor products. II. Puzzles determine facets of the Littlewood–Richardson cone". Journal of the American Mathematical Society. 17 (1): 19–48. arXiv:math/0107011. doi:10.1090/S0894-0347-03-00441-7. MR 2015329. Zbl 1043.05111.

T04a.	Tao, Terence (2004). "Global well-posedness of the Benjamin–Ono equation in H^{1}(ℝ)". Journal of Hyperbolic Differential Equations. 1 (1): 27–49. arXiv:math/0307289. doi:10.1142/S0219891604000032. MR 2052470. Zbl 1055.35104.

T04b.	Tao, Terence (2004). "Fuglede's conjecture is false in 5 and higher dimensions". Mathematical Research Letters. 11 (2–3): 251–258. arXiv:math/0306134. doi:10.4310/MRL.2004.v11.n2.a8. MR 2067470. Zbl 1092.42014.

CT05.	Candes, Emmanuel J.; Tao, Terence (2005). "Decoding by linear programming". IEEE Transactions on Information Theory. 51 (12): 4203–4215. arXiv:math/0502327. Bibcode:2005ITIT...51.4203C. doi:10.1109/TIT.2005.858979. MR 2243152. S2CID 12605120. Zbl 1264.94121.

BT06.	Bejenaru, Ioan; Tao, Terence (2006). "Sharp well-posedness and ill-posedness results for a quadratic non-linear Schrödinger equation". Journal of Functional Analysis. 233 (1): 228–259. arXiv:math/0508210. doi:10.1016/j.jfa.2005.08.004. MR 2204680. Zbl 1090.35162.

BCT06.	Bennett, Jonathan; Carbery, Anthony; Tao, Terence (2006). "On the multilinear restriction and Kakeya conjectures". Acta Mathematica. 196 (2): 261–302. arXiv:math/0509262. doi:10.1007/s11511-006-0006-4. MR 2275834. Zbl 1203.42019.

CRT06a.	Candès, Emmanuel J.; Romberg, Justin K.; Tao, Terence (2006). "Stable signal recovery from incomplete and inaccurate measurements". Communications on Pure and Applied Mathematics. 59 (8): 1207–1223. arXiv:math/0503066. doi:10.1002/cpa.20124. MR 2230846. S2CID 119159284. Zbl 1098.94009.

CRT06b.	Candès, Emmanuel J.; Romberg, Justin; Tao, Terence (2006). "Robust uncertainty principles: exact signal reconstruction from highly incomplete frequency information". IEEE Transactions on Information Theory. 52 (2): 489–509. arXiv:math/0409186. Bibcode:2006ITIT...52..489C. doi:10.1109/TIT.2005.862083. MR 2236170. S2CID 7033413. Zbl 1231.94017.

CT06.	Candes, Emmanuel J.; Tao, Terence (2006). "Near-optimal signal recovery from random projections: universal encoding strategies?". IEEE Transactions on Information Theory. 52 (12): 5406–5425. arXiv:math/0410542. Bibcode:2006ITIT...52.5406C. doi:10.1109/TIT.2006.885507. MR 2300700. S2CID 1431305. Zbl 1309.94033.

CT07.	Candes, Emmanuel; Tao, Terence (2007). "The Dantzig selector: statistical estimation when p is much larger than n". Annals of Statistics. 35 (6): 2313–2351. arXiv:math/0506081. doi:10.1214/009053606000001523. MR 2382644. Zbl 1139.62019.

TVZ07.	Tao, Terence; Visan, Monica; Zhang, Xiaoyi (2007). "The nonlinear Schrödinger equation with combined power-type nonlinearities". Communications in Partial Differential Equations. 32 (7–9): 1281–1343. arXiv:math/0511070. doi:10.1080/03605300701588805. MR 2354495. S2CID 15109526. Zbl 1187.35245.

C+08.	Colliander, J.; Keel, M.; Staffilani, G.; Takaoka, H.; Tao, T. (2008). "Global well-posedness and scattering for the energy-critical nonlinear Schrödinger equation in ℝ^{3}". Annals of Mathematics. Second Series. 167 (3): 767–865. arXiv:math/0402129. doi:10.4007/annals.2008.167.767. MR 2415387. Zbl 1178.35345.

GT08.	Green, Ben; Tao, Terence (2008). "The primes contain arbitrarily long arithmetic progressions". Annals of Mathematics. Second Series. 167 (2): 481–547. arXiv:math/0404188. doi:10.4007/annals.2008.167.481. MR 2415379. Zbl 1191.11025.

KTV09.	Killip, Rowan; Tao, Terence; Visan, Monica (2009). "The cubic nonlinear Schrödinger equation in two dimensions with radial data". Journal of the European Mathematical Society. 11 (6): 1203–1258. arXiv:0707.3188. doi:10.4171/JEMS/180. MR 2557134. Zbl 1187.35237.

CT10.	Candès, Emmanuel J.; Tao, Terence (2010). "The power of convex relaxation: near-optimal matrix completion". IEEE Transactions on Information Theory. 56 (5): 2053–2080. arXiv:0903.1476. Bibcode:2010ITIT...56.2053C. doi:10.1109/TIT.2010.2044061. MR 2723472. S2CID 1255437. Zbl 1366.15021.

GT10.	Green, Ben; Tao, Terence (2008). "The primes contain arbitrarily long arithmetic progressions". Annals of Mathematics. Second Series. 167 (2): 481–547. arXiv:math/0404188. doi:10.4007/annals.2008.167.481. MR 2415379. Zbl 1191.11025.

TV10.	Tao, Terence; Vu, Van (2010). "Random matrices: universality of ESDs and the circular law". Annals of Probability. 38 (5). With an appendix by Manjunath Krishnapur: 2023–2065. arXiv:0807.4898. doi:10.1214/10-AOP534. MR 2722794. Zbl 1203.15025.

TV11.	Tao, Terence; Vu, Van (2011). "Random matrices: universality of local eigenvalue statistics". Acta Mathematica. 206 (1): 127–204. arXiv:0908.1982. doi:10.1007/s11511-011-0061-3. MR 2784665. Zbl 1217.15043.

GTZ12.	Green, Ben; Tao, Terence; Ziegler, Tamar (2012). "An inverse theorem for the Gowers U^{s+1}[N]-norm". Annals of Mathematics. Second Series. 176 (2): 1231–1372. arXiv:1006.0205. doi:10.4007/annals.2012.176.2.11. MR 2950773. Zbl 1282.11007.

T16.	Tao, Terence (2016). "Finite time blowup for an averaged three-dimensional Navier–Stokes equation". Journal of the American Mathematical Society. 29 (3): 601–674. arXiv:1402.0290. doi:10.1090/jams/838. MR 3486169. Zbl 1342.35227.

== Six Math Essentials ==
The book Six Math Essentials, by Tao, was published in 2026 by Quanta Books.

== See also ==
- Cramer conjecture
- Erdős discrepancy problem
- Goldbach's weak conjecture
- Inscribed square problem
