= Alexanderson Award =

Mathematics award

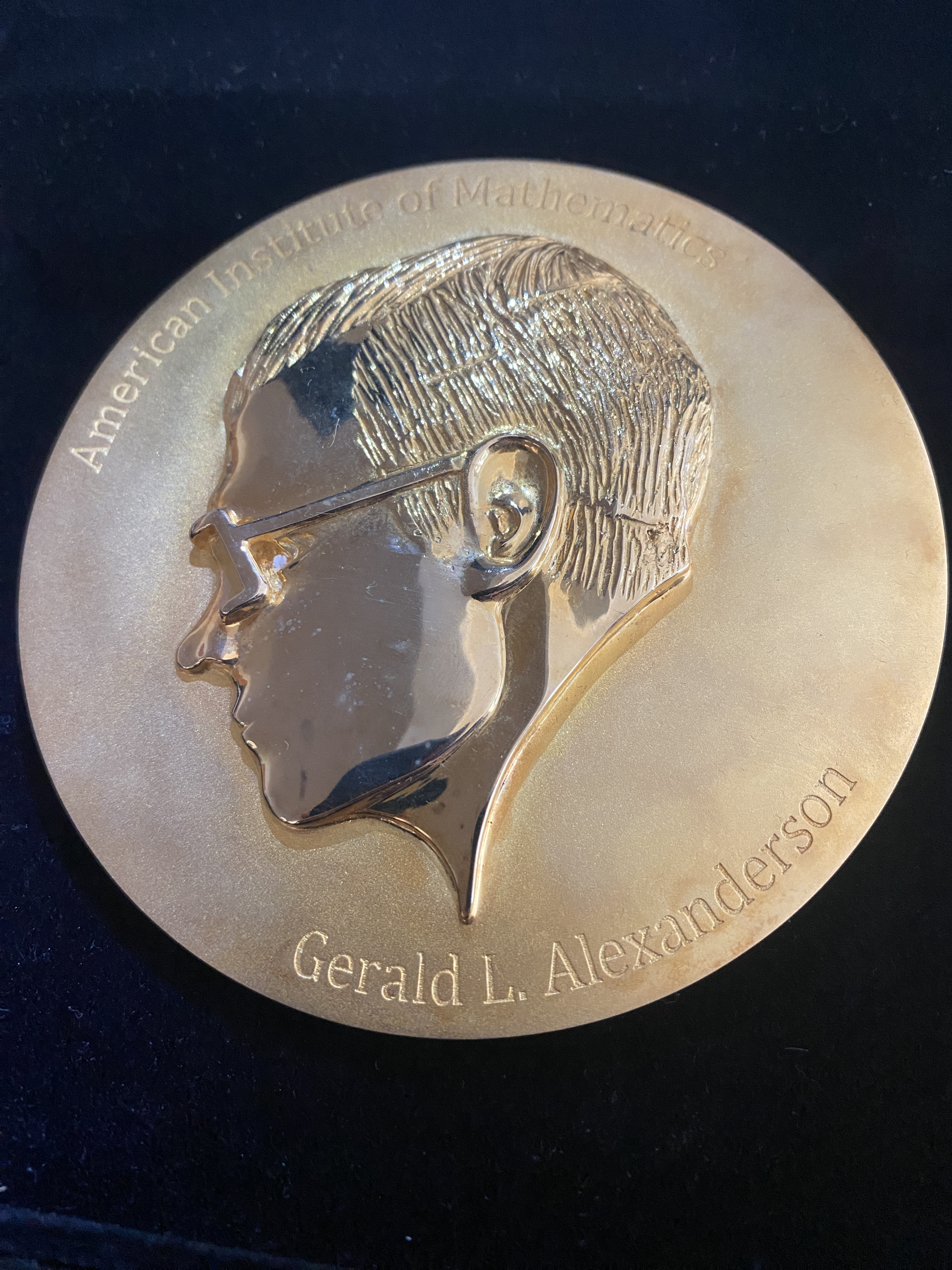
The Alexanderson Award Medal

The Alexanderson Award is given annually by the American Institute of Mathematics.

The award was instituted in 2018. It honors outstanding research articles arising from AIM research activities (workshop, research community, or SQuaRE) which have been published within the past three years.

== Motivation ==
The award was conceived of by John Fry in order to honor Gerald L. Alexanderson, Professor at Santa Clara University and founding chair of AIM's board of trustees.

== Prize ==
Winners of the Alexanderson Award are given a medal, a cash prize and a trip to Bock Cay in the Bahamas.

== Awardees ==
Year	Winners	Paper	AIM Activity
2018	Alexei Borodin, Ivan Corwin, and Patrik Ferrari	"Free energy fluctuations for directed polymers in random media in 1+1 dimensions".	October 2011 workshop, "The Kardar–Parisi–Zhang equation and universality class."
2019	Paul Bruillard, Siu-Hung Ng, Eric C. Rowell, and Zhenghan Wang	"Rank-finiteness for modular categories".	March 2012 workshop, "Classifying fusion categories."
2020	Laura DeMarco, Holly Krieger, and Hexi Ye	"Uniform Manin–Mumford for a family of genus 2 curves".	2016–2019 SQuaRE, "Dynamical Andre-Oort Questions."
2022	Jan Bruinier, Benjamin Howard, Stephen S. Kudla, Michael Rapoport, and Tonghai Yang	"Modularity of generating series of divisors on unitary Shimura varieties" and "Modularity of generating series of divisors on unitary Shimura varieties II: arithmetic applications".	2014–2016 SQuaRE, "Modularity of Generating Series for Special Cycles."
2023	Kaisa Matomäki, Maksym Radziwiłł, Terence Tao, Joni Teräväinen, and Tamar Ziegler	"Higher uniformity of bounded multiplicative functions in short intervals on average".	December 2018 workshop, "Sarnak's conjecture."
2024	Dmitriy Bilyk, Alexey Glazyrin, Ryan Matzke, Josiah Park, and Oleksandr Vlasiuk	"Energy on spheres and discreteness of minimizing measures".	September 2018 workshop, "Discrete geometry and automorphic forms."
2025	Raphaël Beuzart-Plessis, Yifeng Liu, Yichao Tian, Liang Xiao, Wei Zhang, and Xinwen Zhu	"Isolation of the cuspidal spectrum, with applications to the Gan–Gross–Prasad conjecture" and "On the Beilinson-Bloch-Kato conjecture for Rankin-Selberg motives”.	2014–2016 SQuaRE, "Geometry of Shimura varieties and arithmetic application to L-functions."

== See also ==
- List of mathematics awards
