= Prakash Belkale =

Indian-American mathematician

Prakash Belkale (born May 1973, Bangalore) is an Indian-American mathematician, specializing in algebraic geometry and representation theory.

== Education and career ==
Belkale received his Ph.D. in 1999 from the University of Chicago with thesis advisor Madhav Nori.

In 2003, together with Patrick Brosnan, Belkale disproved Maxim Kontsevich's Spanning-Tree Conjecture (first published in 1997).

Let G be a finite connected graph. The Kirchhoff polynomial of G is a certain homogeneous polynomial whose degree is equal to the first betti number of G. These polynomials appear in the study of electrical circuits and in the evaluation of Feynman amplitudes. Motivated by work of D. Kreimer and D. J. Broadhurst associating multiple zeta values to certain Feynman integrals, Kontsevich conjectured that the number of zeros of a Kirchhoff polynomial over the field with q elements is always a polynomial function of q. We show that this conjecture is false by relating the schemes defined by Kirchhoff polynomials to the representation spaces of matroids. Moreover, using Mnev's universality theorem, we show that these schemes essentially generate all arithmetic of schemes of finite type over the integers.

Belkale works on enumerative algebraic geometry, quantum cohomology and moduli spaces of vector bundles on curves (conformal blocks and strange duality), and the Schubert calculus and its connections to intersection theory and representation theory. He is a professor at the University of North Carolina at Chapel Hill.

In 2010 he was an invited speaker at the International Congress of Mathematicians in Hyderabad and gave a talk The tangent space to an enumerative problem. In December 2014 he was elected a Fellow of the American Mathematical Society.

== Selected publications ==
- Belkale, Prakash (2001). "Local systems on $\mathbb{P}^{1}$ – $S$ for $S$ a finite set". Compositio Mathematica. 129 (1): 67–86. doi:10.1023/A:1013195625868.
- Belkale, Prakash (2004). "Invariant Theory of GL(n) and intersection theory of Grassmannians". Int. Math. Res. Not. 2004 (69): 3709–3721. doi:10.1155/S107379280414155X.
- Belkale, Prakash; Brosnan, Patrick (2003). "Periods and Igusa Local Zeta functions". Int. Math. Res. Not. 2003 (49): 2655–2670. doi:10.1155/S107379280313142X.
- Belkale, Prakash; Kumar, Shrawan (2006). "Eigenvalue problem and a new product on cohomology of flag varieties". Invent. Math. 166 (1): 185–228. arXiv:math/0407034. Bibcode:2006InMat.166..185B. doi:10.1007/s00222-006-0516-x. S2CID 1825694.
- Belkale, Prakash (2008). "The strange duality conjecture for generic curves". J. Amer. Math. Soc. 21 (1): 235–258. arXiv:math/0602018. Bibcode:2008JAMS...21..235B. doi:10.1090/S0894-0347-07-00569-3. MR 2350055. S2CID 3096761.
- Belkale, Prakash (2008). "Quantum generalization of the Horn conjecture" (PDF). J. Amer. Math. Soc. 21 (2): 365–408. arXiv:math/0303013. Bibcode:2008JAMS...21..365B. doi:10.1090/S0894-0347-07-00584-X. S2CID 407064.
- Belkale, Prakash (2010). "The tangent space to an enumerative problem" (PDF). Proceedings of the International Congress of Mathematicians.
- Belkale, Prakash (2012). "Unitarity of the KZ/Hitchin connection on conformal blocks in genus 0 for arbitrary Lie algebras". J. Math. Pures Appl. 98 (4): 367–398. arXiv:1101.5846. doi:10.1016/j.matpur.2012.02.008. S2CID 119138383.
