= Riemann Prize =

Mathematics award

The Riemann Prize is a mathematics prize awarded every three years to outstanding mathematicians between 40 and 65 years of age, given by the Riemann International School of Mathematics in Italy. The award is named in honor of Bernhard Riemann. Established in 2019, it was first awarded to Terence Tao in 2020. It is co-sponsored by the regional government of Lombardy, all public and private universities in the region, and the municipality of Varese.

The winner of the Prize is selected by an international committee, the first one composed by: Enrico Bombieri (IAS), Daniele Cassani (RISM – University of Insubria), S.-Y. Alice Chang (Princeton University), Ron Donagi (University of Pennsylvania), Louis Nirenberg (CIMS – NYU, 1925–2020).

== Recipients ==
| Year | Name(s) | Notes |
|---|---|---|
| 2025 | Sylvia Serfaty | |
| 2022 | Luigi Ambrosio | |
| 2019 | Terence Tao | Inaugural winner. |

== See also ==
- List of mathematics awards
