= James Colliander =

American-Canadian mathematician

- Born: 22 June 1967 (age 59); El Paso, Texas
- Education: University of Illinois, Urbana-Champaign
- Known for: partial differential equations
- Awards: Sloan Fellowship (2003); McLean Award (2007)
- Scientific career
- Fields: Mathematics
- Workplaces: University of British Columbia
- Doctoral advisor: Jean Bourgain

James Ellis Colliander (born 22 June 1967) is an American-Canadian mathematician. He is currently Professor of Mathematics at University of British Columbia and served as Director of the Pacific Institute for the Mathematical Sciences (PIMS) during 2016-2021. He was born in El Paso, Texas, and lived there until age 8 and then moved to Hastings, Minnesota. He graduated from Macalester College in 1989. He worked for two years at the United States Naval Research Laboratory on fiber optic sensors and then went to graduate school to study mathematics. He received his PhD from the University of Illinois at Urbana–Champaign in 1997 and was advised by Jean Bourgain. Colliander was a postdoctoral fellow at the University of California, Berkeley and spent semesters at the University of Chicago, the Institute for Advanced Study and the Mathematical Sciences Research Institute.

== Research ==
Colliander's research mostly addresses dynamical aspects of solutions of Hamiltonian partial differential equations, especially non-linear Schrödinger equation.

Colliander is a collaborator with Markus Keel, Gigliola Staffilani, Hideo Takaoka, and Terence Tao, forming a group known as the "I-team". The name of this group has been said to come from a mollification operator used in the team's method of almost conserved quantities, or as an abbreviation for "interaction", referring both to the teamwork of the group and to the interactions of light waves with each other. The group's work was featured in the 2006 Fields Medal citations for group member Tao.

== Organization creation ==
Colliander is co-founder of the education technology company called Crowdmark.

Colliander, with colleagues from PIMS, created Syzygy, a project that provides interactive computing for students and teachers at universities across Canada. Syzygy operates on infrastructure provided by Compute Canada.

Colliander, with colleagues from PIMS and Cybera, created Callysto, a project designed to improve computational thinking for students and teachers in grades 5-12.

Colliander is co-founder of the International Interactive Computing Collaboration (2i2c).

== Major publications ==
- Colliander, J.; Keel, M.; Staffilani, G.; Takaoka, H.; Tao, T. Global well-posedness for Schrödinger equations with derivative. SIAM J. Math. Anal. 33 (2001), no. 3, 649–669.
- Colliander, J.; Keel, M.; Staffilani, G.; Takaoka, H.; Tao, T. A refined global well-posedness result for Schrödinger equations with derivative. SIAM J. Math. Anal. 34 (2002), no. 1, 64–86.
- Colliander, J.; Keel, M.; Staffilani, G.; Takaoka, H.; Tao, T. Almost conservation laws and global rough solutions to a nonlinear Schrödinger equation. Math. Res. Lett. 9 (2002), no. 5-6, 659–682.
- Christ, Michael; Colliander, James; Tao, Terence. Asymptotics, frequency modulation, and low regularity ill-posedness for canonical defocusing equations. Amer. J. Math. 125 (2003), no. 6, 1235–1293.
- Colliander, J.; Keel, M.; Staffilani, G.; Takaoka, H.; Tao, T. Sharp global well-posedness for KdV and modified KdV on $\mathbb{R}$ and $\mathbb{T}$. J. Amer. Math. Soc. 16 (2003), no. 3, 705–749.
- Colliander, J.; Keel, M.; Staffilani, G.; Takaoka, H.; Tao, T. Multilinear estimates for periodic KdV equations, and applications. J. Funct. Anal. 211 (2004), no. 1, 173–218.
- Colliander, J.; Keel, M.; Staffilani, G.; Takaoka, H.; Tao, T. Global existence and scattering for rough solutions of a nonlinear Schrödinger equation on $\mathbb{R}^3$. Comm. Pure Appl. Math. 57 (2004), no. 8, 987–1014.
- Colliander, J.; Keel, M.; Staffilani, G.; Takaoka, H.; Tao, T. (2008), "Global well-posedness and scattering for the energy-critical nonlinear Schrödinger equation in ℝ^{3}", Annals of Mathematics, Second Series, 167 (3): 767–865, arXiv:math/0402129, doi:10.4007/annals.2008.167.767, MR 2415387.
- Colliander, J.; Keel, M.; Staffilani, G.; Takaoka, H.; Tao, T. (2010), "Transfer of energy to high frequencies in the cubic defocusing nonlinear Schrödinger equation", Inventiones Mathematicae, 181 (1): 39–113, arXiv:0808.1742, Bibcode:2010InMat.181...39C, doi:10.1007/s00222-010-0242-2, hdl:1721.1/71665, MR 2651381.
