= Allen Knutson =

American mathematician

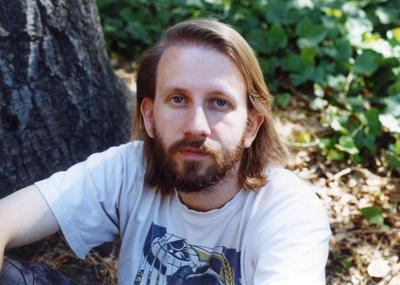
- Born: Allen Ivar Knutson

Academic background
- Education: California Institute of Technology (BS); Massachusetts Institute of Technology (PhD)

Academic work
- Discipline: Mathematics
- Institutions: University of California, Berkeley; University of California, San Diego; Cornell University

Allen Ivar Knutson is an American mathematician who is a professor of mathematics at Cornell University.

== Education ==
Knutson graduated from Stuyvesant High School and completed his undergraduate studies at the California Institute of Technology and received a Ph.D. from the Massachusetts Institute of Technology in 1996 under the joint advisorship of Victor Guillemin and Lisa Jeffrey.

== Career ==
He was on the faculty at the University of California, Berkeley before moving to the University of California, San Diego in 2005 and then to Cornell University in 2009. In 2005, he and Terence Tao won the Levi L. Conant Prize of the American Mathematical Society for their paper "Honeycombs and Sums of Hermitian Matrices". He was an invited speaker at the 2022 International Congress of Mathematicians.

Knutson is also known for his studies of the mathematics of juggling. For five years beginning in 1990, he and fellow Caltech student David Morton held a world record for passing 12 balls.

== Personal life ==
Knutson is the son of Donald Ivar Knutson, an American mathematician and financial executive at CBS.
