= Lisa Jeffrey =

Canadian mathematician

- Education: University of Oxford
- Awards: Krieger–Nelson Prize (2001); Coxeter–James Prize (2002)
- Scientific career
- Fields: Mathematics
- Workplaces: University of Toronto
- Thesis: On Some Aspects of Chern-Simons Gauge Theory (Gauge Theory, Path Integral) (1991)
- Doctoral advisor: Michael Atiyah
- Doctoral students: Allen Knutson
- Website: www.math.toronto.edu/jeffrey/

Lisa Claire Jeffrey FRSC is a Canadian mathematician, a professor of mathematics at the University of Toronto. In her research, she uses symplectic geometry to provide rigorous proofs of results in quantum field theory.

== Education and career ==
Jeffrey graduated from Princeton University in 1986. She was awarded the Marshall Scholarship and obtained her doctorate from the University of Oxford in 1991, under the supervision of Sir Michael Atiyah.

After working as postdoctoral researcher at the Institute for Advanced Study, she became an assistant professor at Princeton in 1992. She then moved to McGill University in 1995, and became full professor at the University of Toronto in 1997.

Jeffrey was the 2001 winner of the Krieger–Nelson Prize and the 2002 winner of the Coxeter–James Prize. In 2007 she became a fellow of the Royal Society of Canada, and in 2012 she became a fellow of the American Mathematical Society. She was chosen to give the Association for Women in Mathematics-American Mathematical Society 2017 Noether Lecture at the Joint Mathematics Meetings.

== Selected publications ==
- Quantum fields and strings: a course for mathematicians. Vol. 1, 2. Material from the Special Year on Quantum Field Theory held at the Institute for Advanced Study, Princeton, NJ, 1996–1997. Edited by Pierre Deligne, Pavel Etingof, Daniel S. Freed, Lisa C. Jeffrey, David Kazhdan, John W. Morgan, David R. Morrison and Edward Witten. American Mathematical Society, Providence, RI; Institute for Advanced Study (IAS), Princeton, NJ, 1999. Vol. 1: xxii+723 pp.; Vol. 2: pp. i–xxiv and 727–1501. ISBN 0-8218-1198-3, 81-06 (81T30 81Txx)
