= Nemmers Prize in Mathematics =

American mathematics award

The Frederic Esser Nemmers Prize in Mathematics is awarded biennially from Northwestern University. It was initially endowed along with a companion prize, the Erwin Plein Nemmers Prize in Economics, as part of a $14 million donation from the Nemmers brothers. They envisioned creating an award that would be as prestigious as the Nobel Prize. To this end, the majority of the income earned from the endowment is returned to the principal to increase the size of the award.

As of 2023, the award carries a $300,000 stipend and the scholar spends several weeks in residence at Northwestern University.

== Recipients ==
Following recipients received this award:

- 1994 Yuri I. Manin
- 1996 Joseph B. Keller
- 1998 John H. Conway
- 2000 Edward Witten
- 2002 Yakov G. Sinai
- 2004 Mikhail Gromov
- 2006 Robert Langlands
- 2008 Simon Donaldson
- 2010 Terence Tao
- 2012 Ingrid Daubechies
- 2014 Michael J. Hopkins
- 2016 János Kollár
- 2018 Assaf Naor
- 2020 Nalini Anantharaman
- 2022 Bhargav Bhatt
- 2024 Luigi Ambrosio
- 2026 Andrei Okounkov

== See also ==
- List of mathematics awards
- List of awards considered the highest in a field
