= Coxeter–James Prize =

Coxeter-James Prize
- Type: Mathematics
- Country: Canada
- Eligibility: Member of the Canadian mathematical community; Ph.D degree conferred within the past ten years
- Established: 1978
- Currently held by: Carlo Pegano
- Website: Canadian Mathematical Society Prizes and Awards

The Coxeter-James Prize is a mathematics award given by the Canadian Mathematical Society (CMS) to recognize outstanding contributions to mathematics by young mathematicians in Canada. First presented in 1978, the prize is named after two renowned Canadian mathematicians, Donald Coxeter and Ralph James.

The prize is awarded annually to a young Canadian mathematician who has made significant contributions to the field of mathematics. It is intended to recognize and encourage young mathematicians in Canada and to promote the development of mathematics in the country.

Recipients of the Coxeter-James Prize are selected by the CMS Research Committee and are typically honored at the Society's annual meeting.

The Coxeter-James Prize is one of several awards given by the Canadian Mathematical Society to recognize and encourage excellence in mathematics. Other awards given by the Society include the Jeffery–Williams Prize, the Krieger–Nelson Prize, and the Blair Spearman Doctoral Prize.

== Recipients of the Coxeter–James Prize ==
The Canadian Mathematical Society has awarded the Coxeter–James prize to the following recipients:

- 2026: Carlo Pegano
- 2025: Chris Kapulkin
- 2024: Michael Groechenig
- 2023: Robert Haslhofer
- 2022: Fabio Pusateri
- 2021: Luke Postle
- 2020: Jacopo De Simoi
- 2019: Jacob Tsimerman
- 2018: Maksym Radziwill
- 2017: Sabin Cautis
- 2016: Louigi Addario-Berry
- 2015: Dong Li
- 2014: Marco Gualtieri
- 2013: Balázs Szegedy
- 2012: Gregory Smith
- 2011: Iosif Polterovich
- 2010: Bálint Virág
- 2009: Patrick Brosnan
- 2008: Ravi Vakil
- 2007: Vinayak Vatsal
- 2006: Jim Geelen
- 2005: Robert McCann
- 2004: Izabella Łaba
- 2003: Jingyi Chen
- 2002: Lisa Jeffrey
- 2001: Kai Behrend
- 2000: Damien Roy
- 1999: Maciej Zworski
- 1998: Henri Darmon
- 1997: Michael Ward
- 1996: Nigel Higson
- 1995: Gordon Slade
- 1994: Mark Spivakovsky
- 1993: Jacques Hurtubise
- 1992: J.F. Jardine
- 1991: V. Kumar Murty
- 1990: Nassif Ghoussoub
- 1989: Alan Dow
- 1988: M. Ram Murty
- 1987: Jonathan Borwein
- 1986: Edwin A. Perkins
- 1985: Paul Selick
- 1984: Mark Goresky
- 1983: Man-Duen Choi
- 1982: John Mallet-Paret
- 1981: John James Millson
- 1980: Francis Clarke
- 1979: David W. Boyd
- 1978: Robert Moody

== See also ==
- List of mathematics awards
