= Monica Vișan =

Romanian mathematician

- Born: August 5, 1979 (age 47); Drobeta-Turnu Severin, Romania
- Education: University of California, Los Angeles
- Known for: Work on the nonlinear Schrödinger equation
- Awards: Sloan Research Fellowship (2010)
- Scientific career
- Fields: Mathematics: partial differential equations
- Institutions: University of California, Los Angeles
- Thesis: The Defocusing Energy-Critical Nonlinear Schrödinger Equation in Dimensions Five and Higher (2006)
- Doctoral advisor: Terence Tao
- Website: www.math.ucla.edu/~visan/

Monica Vișan (born August 5, 1979, in Drobeta-Turnu Severin, Romania) is a Romanian mathematician at the University of California, Los Angeles who specializes in partial differential equations and is well known for her work on the nonlinear Schrödinger equation.

== Education and career ==
Vișan earned a bachelor's degree at the University of Bucharest in 2002. She became a student of Terence Tao at the University of California, Los Angeles (UCLA), where she completed her doctorate in 2006. Her dissertation was titled The Defocusing Energy-Critical Nonlinear Schrödinger Equation in Dimensions Five and Higher.

After postdoctoral research at the Institute for Advanced Study, Vișan became an assistant professor in the mathematics department at the University of Chicago in 2008. She returned to UCLA as a faculty member in 2009 and (keeping her appointment at UCLA) spent 2010–2011 as Harrington Faculty Fellow at the University of Texas at Austin.

== Recognition ==
Vișan won a Sloan Research Fellowship in 2010. She was elected as a Fellow of the American Mathematical Society in the 2024 class of fellows.

== Selected publications ==
With Herbert Koch and Daniel Tătaru, Vișan is the author of the book Dispersive Equations and Nonlinear Waves: Generalized Korteweg–de Vries, Nonlinear Schrödinger, Wave and Schrödinger Maps.

Her research papers include:

- Ryckman, Eric; Vișan, Monica (2007), "Global well-posedness and scattering for the defocusing energy-critical nonlinear Schrödinger equation in $\mathbb{R}^{1+4}$", American Journal of Mathematics, 129 (1): 1–60, arXiv:math/0501462, doi:10.1353/ajm.2007.0004, MR 2288737, S2CID 19024265
- Vișan, Monica (2007), "The defocusing energy-critical nonlinear Schrödinger equation in higher dimensions", Duke Mathematical Journal, 138 (2): 281–374, arXiv:math/0508298, doi:10.1215/S0012-7094-07-13825-0, MR 2318286, S2CID 2427673
- Tao, Terence; Vișan, Monica; Zhang, Xiaoyi (2007), "The nonlinear Schrödinger equation with combined power-type nonlinearities", Communications in Partial Differential Equations, 32 (7–9): 1281–1343, arXiv:math/0511070, doi:10.1080/03605300701588805, MR 2354495, S2CID 15109526
- Killip, Rowan; Tao, Terence; Vișan, Monica (2009), "The cubic nonlinear Schrödinger equation in two dimensions with radial data", Journal of the European Mathematical Society, 11 (6): 1203–1258, arXiv:0707.3188, doi:10.4171/JEMS/180, MR 2557134
- Killip, Rowan; Vişan, Monica (2010), "The focusing energy-critical nonlinear Schrödinger equation in dimensions five and higher", American Journal of Mathematics, 132 (2): 361–424, arXiv:0804.1018, doi:10.1353/ajm.0.0107, MR 2654778, S2CID 1068572
- Killip, Rowan; Vişan, Monica (2013), "Nonlinear Schrödinger equations at critical regularity" (PDF), Evolution equations, Clay Math. Proc., vol. 17, Amer. Math. Soc., Providence, RI, pp. 325–437, MR 3098643
