= Gigliola Staffilani =

Italian-American mathematician

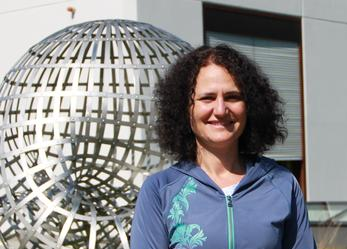
- Gigliola Staffilani (2013)
- Born: March 24, 1966 (age 60)
- Education: University of Chicago
- Awards: Fellow, American Mathematical Society (2012) Fellow, American Academy of Arts and Sciences (2014) Member, National Academy of Sciences (2021)
- Scientific career
- Fields: Mathematics
- Workplaces: Stanford University; Brown University; MIT
- Thesis: The initial value problem for some dispersive differential equations (1995)
- Doctoral advisor: Carlos Kenig
- Website: math.mit.edu/~gigliola/

Gigliola Staffilani (born March 24, 1966) is an Italian-American mathematician who works as the Abby Rockefeller Mauze Professor of Mathematics at the Massachusetts Institute of Technology. Her research concerns harmonic analysis and partial differential equations, including the Korteweg–de Vries equation and Schrödinger equation.

== Education and career ==
Staffilani grew up on a farm in Martinsicuro in central Italy, speaking only the local dialect, and with no books until her older brother brought some back from his school. Her father died when she was 10, and her mother decided that she did not need to continue on to high school, but her brother helped her change her mother's mind. She came to love mathematics at her school, and was encouraged by her teachers and brother to continue her studies, with the idea that she could return to Martinsicuro as a mathematics teacher. She earned a fellowship to study at the University of Bologna, where she earned a laurea in mathematics in 1989 with an undergraduate thesis on Green's functions for elliptic partial differential equations.

At the suggestion of one of her professors at Bologna, she moved to the University of Chicago for her graduate studies, to study with Carlos Kenig. When she arrived at Chicago, still knowing very little English and not having taken the Test of English as a Foreign Language, she had the wrong type of visa to obtain the teaching fellowship she had been promised. She almost returned home, but remained after Paul Sally intervened and loaned her enough money to get by until the issue could be resolved. At Chicago, she studied dispersive partial differential equations with Kenig, earning a master's degree in 1991 and a Ph.D. in 1995.

After postdoctoral studies at the Institute for Advanced Study, Stanford University, and Princeton University, Staffilani took a tenure-track faculty position at Stanford in 1999, and earned tenure there in 2001. While at Stanford, she met her husband, Tomasz Mrowka, a mathematics professor at MIT, and after a year and a half found a faculty position closer to him at Brown University. She moved to MIT in 2002, where, in 2006 she became the second female full professor of mathematics. She served as an American Mathematical Society Council member at large from 2018 to 2020.

== Collaboration ==
Staffilani is a frequent collaborator with James Colliander, Markus Keel, Hideo Takaoka, and Terence Tao, forming a group known as the "I-team". The name of this group has been said to come from the notation for a mollification operator used in the team's method of almost conserved quantities, or as an abbreviation for "interaction", referring both to the teamwork of the group and to the interactions of light waves with each other. The group's work was featured prominently in Fefferman's 2006 Fields Medal citations for group member Tao.

== Awards and honors ==
Staffilani was a Sloan Fellow from 2000 to 2002. In 2009-2010 she was a member of the Radcliffe Institute for Advanced Study. In 2012 she became one of the inaugural fellows of the American Mathematical Society. In 2014 she was inducted into the American Academy of Arts and Sciences. In 2021, she was elected to the National Academy of Sciences.

== Major publications ==
- Colliander, J.; Keel, M.; Staffilani, G.; Takaoka, H.; Tao, T. Global well-posedness for Schrödinger equations with derivative. SIAM J. Math. Anal. 33 (2001), no. 3, 649–669.
- Colliander, J.; Keel, M.; Staffilani, G.; Takaoka, H.; Tao, T. A refined global well-posedness result for Schrödinger equations with derivative. SIAM J. Math. Anal. 34 (2002), no. 1, 64–86.
- Colliander, J.; Keel, M.; Staffilani, G.; Takaoka, H.; Tao, T. Almost conservation laws and global rough solutions to a nonlinear Schrödinger equation. Math. Res. Lett. 9 (2002), no. 5-6, 659–682.
- Staffilani, Gigliola; Tataru, Daniel. Strichartz estimates for a Schrödinger operator with nonsmooth coefficients. Comm. Partial Differential Equations 27 (2002), no. 7-8, 1337–1372. doi:10.1081/PDE-120005841 MR 1924470
- Colliander, J.; Keel, M.; Staffilani, G.; Takaoka, H.; Tao, T. Sharp global well-posedness for KdV and modified KdV on $\mathbb{R}$ and $\mathbb{T}$. J. Amer. Math. Soc. 16 (2003), no. 3, 705–749. doi:10.1090/S0894-0347-03-00421-1 MR 1969209 arXiv:math/0110045
- Colliander, J.; Keel, M.; Staffilani, G.; Takaoka, H.; Tao, T. Multilinear estimates for periodic KdV equations, and applications. J. Funct. Anal. 211 (2004), no. 1, 173–218.
- Colliander, J.; Keel, M.; Staffilani, G.; Takaoka, H.; Tao, T. Global existence and scattering for rough solutions of a nonlinear Schrödinger equation on $\mathbb{R}^3$. Comm. Pure Appl. Math. 57 (2004), no. 8, 987–1014.
- Colliander, J.; Keel, M.; Staffilani, G.; Takaoka, H.; Tao, T. Global well-posedness and scattering for the energy-critical nonlinear Schrödinger equation in $\mathbb{R}^3$. Ann. of Math. (2) 167 (2008), no. 3, 767–865. doi:10.4007/annals.2008.167.767 MR 2415387
