= Rowan Killip =

American mathematician

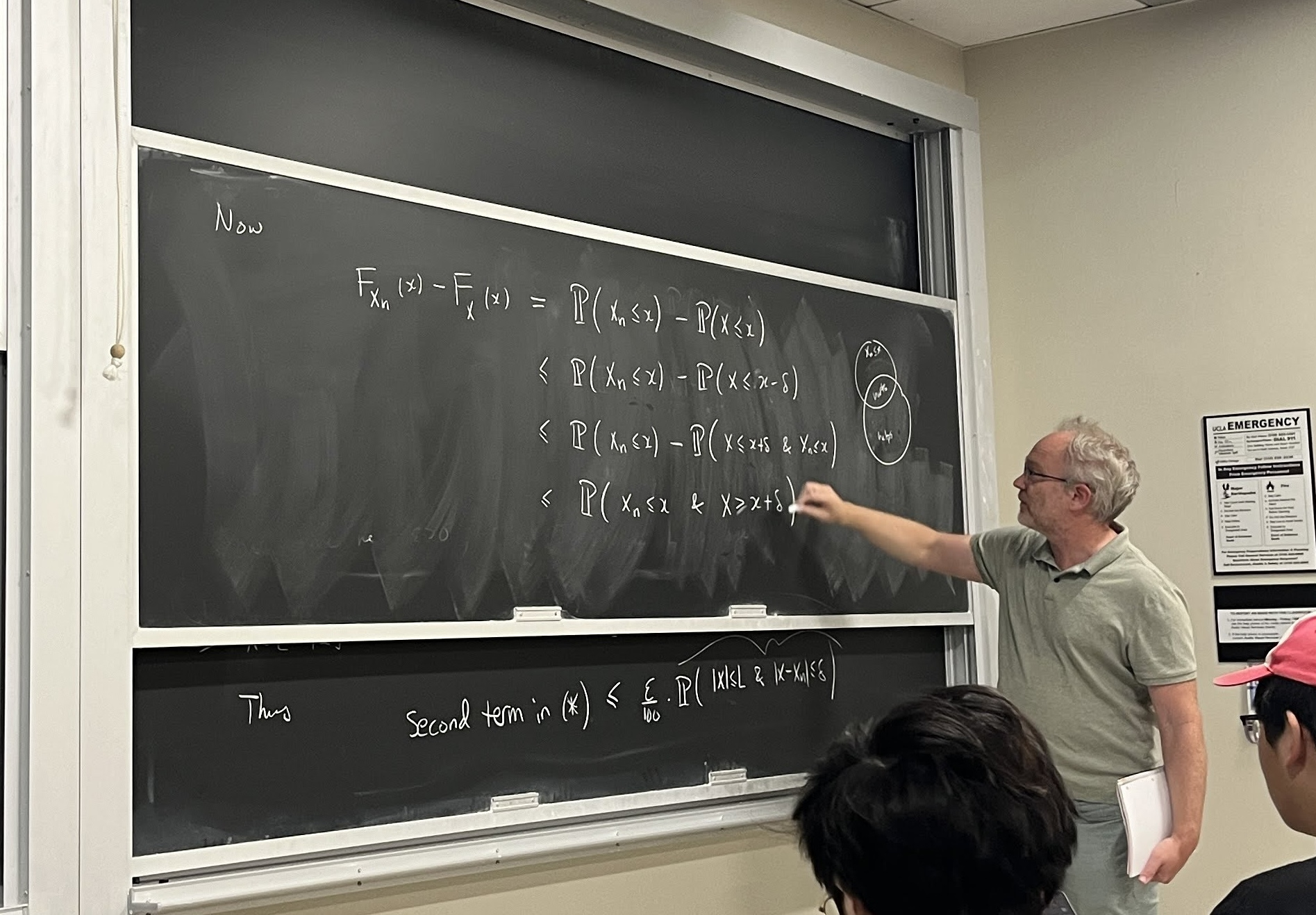
- Killip teaching undergraduate probability in 2024
- Education: University of Auckland, California Institute of Technology
- Known for: Partial differential equations, Nonlinear Schrödinger equation
- Spouse: Monica Vișan
- Scientific career
- Workplaces: UCLA
- Doctoral advisor: Barry Simon

Rowan Killip is an American–New Zealand mathematician at the University of California, Los Angeles whose work focuses on mathematical physics, particularly partial differential equations. He won a Sloan Research Fellowship in 2004 and a Simons Fellowship in Mathematics in 2015. In 2023, he won, along with Monica Vișan, the Frontiers of Science Award at the International Congress for Basic Science in Beijing, China for proving the global well-posedness of the Korteweg–De Vries equation in the Sobolev space H^{−1}.

== Early life and education ==
Killip was an undergraduate at the University of Auckland. He completed his Ph.D. at the California Institute of Technology in 2000. His doctoral advisor was Barry Simon; his doctoral thesis was titled Perturbations of One-Dimensional Schrödinger Operators Preserving the Absolutely Continuous Spectrum.

== Career ==
Following his doctoral studies, he was a postdoctoral researcher at the University of Pennsylvania, the Institute for Advanced Study, and the Mittag-Leffler Institute before returning to Caltech again. He joined the faculty at UCLA as an assistant professor in 2003, becoming full professor in 2009.

== Selected publications ==
Killip's research papers include:

- Killip, Rowan; Tao, Terence; Vișan, Monica (2009), "The cubic nonlinear Schrödinger equation in two dimensions with radial data", Journal of the European Mathematical Society, 11 (6): 1203–1258, arXiv:0707.3188, doi:10.4171/JEMS/180, MR 2557134
- Killip, Rowan; Vişan, Monica (2010), "The focusing energy-critical nonlinear Schrödinger equation in dimensions five and higher", American Journal of Mathematics, 132 (2): 361–424, arXiv:0804.1018, doi:10.1353/ajm.0.0107, MR 2654778, S2CID 1068572
- Killip, Rowan; Vişan, Monica (2013), "Nonlinear Schrödinger equations at critical regularity" (PDF), Evolution equations, Clay Math. Proc., vol. 17, Amer. Math. Soc., Providence, RI, pp. 325–437, MR 3098643
- Killip, Rowan; Vişan, Monica (2019), "KdV is well-posed in H^{–1}", Annals of Mathematics, 190, Department of Mathematics, Princeton University: 249–305, arXiv:1802.04851, doi:10.4007/annals.2019.190.1.4, MR 3990604
