= Jonathan Bennett (mathematician) =

British mathematician

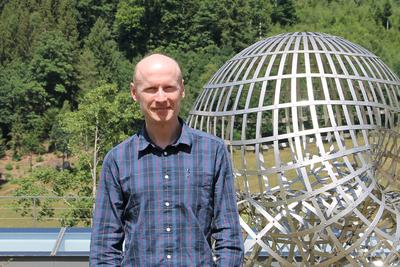
- Bennett at Oberwolfach in 2022
- Education: University of Edinburgh; University of Oxford
- Awards: Whitehead Prize (2011)
- Scientific career
- Fields: Mathematics
- Workplaces: University of Birmingham
- Doctoral advisor: Anthony Carbery

Jonathan Bennett is a British mathematician and Professor of Mathematical Analysis at the University of Birmingham. He was a recipient of the Whitehead Prize of the London Mathematical Society in 2011 for "his foundational work on multilinear inequalities in harmonic and geometric analysis, and for a number of major results in the theory of oscillatory integrals."

== Education ==
In 1995 he graduated with a BA in mathematics from Hertford College at the University of Oxford. He went on to study for a PhD in harmonic analysis under Anthony Carbery at the University of Edinburgh, graduating in 1999.

== Career ==
Bennett has done postdoctoral work at the University of Edinburgh, the Universidad Autonoma de Madrid and Trinity College Dublin. He joined the University of Birmingham in 2005. Bennett is an editor for the journals Mathematika and Quarterly Journal of Mathematics.

Bennett is known for his work in harmonic analysis, particularly in applying the methods of heat flow monotonicity and induction-on-scale arguments to prove inequalities arising in harmonic and geometric analysis, in particular for his work (jointly with Anthony Carbery and Terence Tao) on the multilinear Kakeya conjecture. Bennett has an Erdős number of 3, via his collaboration with Tao.
