= Sergiu Klainerman =

Romanian American mathematician

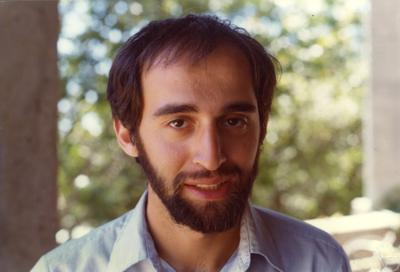
- Sergiu Klainerman in 1978
- Born: May 13, 1950 (age 76); Bucharest, Romanian People's Republic
- Education: University of Bucharest; New York University
- Awards: Bôcher Prize (1999)
- Scientific career
- Fields: Mathematics
- Workplaces: University of California, Berkeley; New York University; Princeton University
- Thesis: Global Existence for Nonlinear Wave Equations (1978)
- Doctoral advisors: Fritz John; Louis Nirenberg
- Doctoral students: Gustavo Ponce

Sergiu Klainerman (born May 13, 1950) is a mathematician known for his contributions to the study of hyperbolic differential equations and general relativity. He is currently the Eugene Higgins Professor of Mathematics at Princeton University, where he has been teaching since 1987.

== Biography ==
He was born in 1950 in Bucharest, Romania, into a Jewish family. After attending the Petru Groza High School, he studied mathematics at the University of Bucharest from 1969 to 1974. For graduate studies he went to New York University, obtaining his Ph.D. in 1978. His thesis, written under the direction of Fritz John and Louis Nirenberg, was titled Global Existence for Nonlinear Wave Equations. From 1978 to 1980 Klainerman was a Miller Research Fellow at the University of California, Berkeley, while from 1980 to 1987 he was a faculty member at New York University's Courant Institute of Mathematical Sciences, rising in rank to Professor in 1986.

Klainerman is a member of the U.S. National Academy of Sciences (elected 2005), a foreign member of the French Academy of Sciences (elected 2002) and a Fellow of the American Academy of Arts and Sciences (elected 1996). In 2003, he was awarded the Romanian Order of Merit, Commander rank. He was elected to the 2018 class of fellows of the American Mathematical Society.

He was named a MacArthur Fellow in 1991 and Guggenheim Fellow in 1997. Klainerman was awarded the Bôcher Memorial Prize by the American Mathematical Society in 1999 "for his contributions to nonlinear hyperbolic equations". He is currently a co-Editor-in-Chief of Publications Mathématiques de l'IHÉS.

== Major publications ==
- Klainerman, Sergiu (1980). "Global existence for nonlinear wave equations". Communications on Pure and Applied Mathematics. 33 (1): 43–101. doi:10.1002/cpa.3160330104. MR 0544044.
- Klainerman, Sergiu; Majda, Andrew (1981). "Singular limits of quasilinear hyperbolic systems with large parameters and the incompressible limit of compressible fluids". Communications on Pure and Applied Mathematics. 34 (4): 481–524. Bibcode:1981CPAM...34..481K. doi:10.1002/cpa.3160340405. MR 0615627.
- Klainerman, Sergiu; Majda, Andrew. Compressible and incompressible fluids. Comm. Pure Appl. Math. 35 (1982), no. 5, 629–651.
- Klainerman, Sergiu. Global existence of small amplitude solutions to nonlinear Klein-Gordon equations in four space-time dimensions. Comm. Pure Appl. Math. 38 (1985), no. 5, 631–641.
- Klainerman, Sergiu. Uniform decay estimates and the Lorentz invariance of the classical wave equation. Comm. Pure Appl. Math. 38 (1985), no. 3, 321–332.
- Klainerman, S. The null condition and global existence to nonlinear wave equations. Nonlinear systems of partial differential equations in applied mathematics, Part 1 (Santa Fe, N.M., 1984), 293–326, Lectures in Appl. Math., 23, Amer. Math. Soc., Providence, RI, 1986.
- Klainerman, S.; Machedon, M. Space-time estimates for null forms and the local existence theorem. Comm. Pure Appl. Math. 46 (1993), no. 9, 1221–1268.
- Klainerman, S.; Machedon, M. Smoothing estimates for null forms and applications. A celebration of John F. Nash, Jr., Duke Mathematical Journal 81 (1995), no. 1, 99–133 (1996).
- Klainerman, Sergiu; Sideris, Thomas C. On almost global existence for nonrelativistic wave equations in 3D. Comm. Pure Appl. Math. 49 (1996), no. 3, 307–321.

== Books ==
- Christodoulou, Demetrios; Klainerman, Sergiu. The global nonlinear stability of the Minkowski space. Princeton Mathematical Series, 41. Princeton University Press, Princeton, NJ, 1993. x+514 pp. ISBN 0-691-08777-6
- Klainerman, Sergiu; Nicolò, Francesco. The evolution problem in general relativity. Progress in Mathematical Physics, 25. Birkhäuser Boston, Inc., Boston, MA, 2003. xiv+385 pp. ISBN 0-8176-4254-4
