= Maryam Mirzakhani Prize in Mathematics =

Biennial award

The Maryam Mirzakhani Prize in Mathematics (ex-NAS Award in Mathematics until 2012) is awarded by the U.S. National Academy of Sciences "for excellence of research in the mathematical sciences published within the past ten years."

The original prize was for $5,000 and was awarded every four years; this was suspended after 2012.

In 2018, the prize was renamed after the Iranian mathematician Maryam Mirzakhani; the prize money was increased to $20,000 and was to be awarded every two years.

== Award winners ==
- 2026: Roman Bezrukavnikov "for varied and profound contributions to geometric representation theory."
- 2024: Sylvia Serfaty "for outstanding contributions to nonlinear partial differential equations and statistical physics."
- 2022: Camillo De Lellis "for his fundamental contributions to the study of dissipative solutions to the incompressible Euler equations and to the regularity theory of minimal surfaces."
- 2020: Larry Guth "for developing surprising, original, and deep connections between geometry, analysis, topology, and combinatorics, which have led to the solution of, or major advances on, many outstanding problems in these fields."
- 2012: Michael J. Hopkins "For his leading role in the development of homotopy theory, which has both reinvigorated algebraic topology as a central field in mathematics and led to the resolution of the Kervaire invariant problem for framed manifolds."
- 2008: Clifford H. Taubes "For groundbreaking work relating to Seiberg-Witten and Gromov-Witten invariants of symplectic 4-manifolds, and his proof of Weinstein conjecture for all contact 3-manifolds."
- 2004: Dan-Virgil Voiculescu "For the theory of free probability, in particular, using random matrices and a new concept of entropy to solve several hitherto intractable problems in von Neumann algebras."
- 2000: Ingrid Daubechies "For fundamental discoveries on wavelets and wavelet expansions and for her role in making wavelet methods a practical basic tool of applied mathematics."
- 1996: Andrew J. Wiles "For his proof of Fermat's Last Theorem by discovering a beautiful strategy to establish a major portion of the Shimura-Taniyama conjecture, and for his courage and technical power in bringing his idea to completion."
- 1992: Robert MacPherson "For his role in the introduction and application of radically new approaches to the topology of singular spaces, including characteristics classes, intersection homology, perverse sheaves, and stratified Morse theory."
- 1988: Robert P. Langlands "For his extraordinary vision, which has brought the theory of group representations into a revolutionary new relationship with the theory of automorphic forms and number theory."

== See also ==
- List of mathematics awards
