= Gustavo Ponce =

Venezuelan mathematician (born 1952)

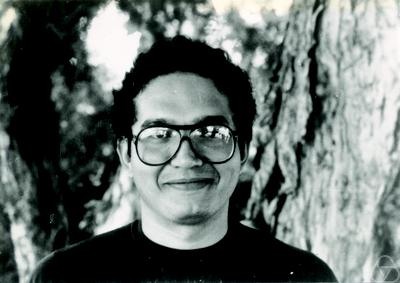
Ponce in Berkeley in 1982

Gustavo A. Ponce (born 20 April 1952 in Venezuela) is a Venezuelan mathematician.

== Education and career ==
Ponce graduated from the Central University of Venezuela with a bachelor's degree in 1976. At the Courant Institute of Mathematical Sciences of New York University he graduated with a master's degree in 1980 and a Ph.D. in 1982 with thesis Long time stability of solutions of nonlinear evolution equations under the supervision of Sergiu Klainerman (and Louis Nirenberg). Ponce was a visiting lecturer at the University of California, Berkeley from 1982 to 1984, an assistant professor at the Central University of Venezuela from 1984 to 1986, and an assistant professor at the University of Chicago from 1986 to 1989. He was from 1989 to 1991 an associate professor at Pennsylvania State University and is since 1991 a full professor at the University of California, Santa Barbara.

He was a visiting professor for brief periods at many academic institutions, including the University of Bonn in 1989, the University of Paris-Sud in 1997 (and again in 2003 and 2012), MSRI in 2001, the Instituto Nacional de Matemática Pura e Aplicada (IMPA) in 2002 (and again in 2010), the Institute for Advanced Study in 2004, the Institute Henri Poincaré in 2009, the Autonomous University of Madrid in 2011, the University of the Basque Country in 2015, and IHES in 2016.

Ponce does research on nonlinear partial differential equations (PDEs) using PDE solutions to equations in mathematical physics, such as the Euler and Navier-Stokes equations of hydrodynamics.

He was on the editorial boards of Transactions of the AMS from 2006 to 2014 and the Memoirs of the AMS from 2006 to 2014. In 1998 he was an Invited Speaker with talk On nonlinear dispersive equations at the International Congress of Mathematicians in Berlin. In 2012 he was elected a Fellow of the American Mathematical Society.

== Selected publications ==
- with Felipe Linares: Introduction to nonlinear dispersive equations, Universitext (2nd ed.), Springer, 2015, doi:10.1007/978-1-4939-2181-2, ISBN 978-1-4939-2180-5
- with Sergiu Klainerman: Klainerman, S.; Ponce, Gustavo (1983), "Global, small amplitude solutions to nonlinear evolution equations", Communications on Pure and Applied Mathematics, 63: 133–141, doi:10.1002/cpa.3160360106
- with Tosio Kato: Kato, Tosio; Ponce, Gustavo (1988), "Commutators estimates and the Euler and Navier-Stokes equations", Communications on Pure and Applied Mathematics, 41 (7): 891–907, doi:10.1002/cpa.3160410704
- with Felipe Linares: Linares, Felipe; Ponce, Gustavo (1993), "On the Davey-Stewartson systems", Annales de l'Institut Henri Poincaré C, 10 (5): 523–548, doi:10.1016/S0294-1449(16)30203-7
- with Carlos Kenig and Luis Vega: Kenig, Carlos; Ponce, Gustavo; Vega, Luis (1996), "A bilinear estimate with applications to KdV equation", Journal of the American Mathematical Society, 9 (2): 573–603, doi:10.1090/S0894-0347-96-00200-7, JSTOR 2152869
- with Carlos Kenig and Luis Vega: "Smoothing effects and local theory theory for generalized nonlinear Schrödinger equations", Inventiones Mathematicae, 134: 489–545, 1998, doi:10.1007/s002220050272
- with Carlos Kenig and Luis Vega: Kenig, Carlos E.; Ponce, Gustavo; Vega, Luis (2004), "The Cauchy problem for quasi-linear Schrödinger equations", Inventiones Mathematicae, 158 (2): 343–388, doi:10.1007/s00222-004-0373-4
- with Carlos Kenig, Christian Rolvung, and Luis Vega: Kenig, C.E.; Ponce, G.; Rolvung, C.; Vega, L. (2005), "Variable Coefficient Schrödinger flows for ultrahyperbolic operators", Advances in Mathematics, 196 (2): 373–486, arXiv:math/0503205, doi:10.1016/j.aim.2004.02.002
- with A. Alexandrou Himonas, Gerard Misiolek, and Yong Zhou: Himonas, A. Alexandrou; Misiołek, Gerard; Ponce, Gustavo; Zhou, Yong (2007), "Persistence Properties and Unique Continuation of Solutions of the Camassa-Holm equation", Communications in Mathematical Physics, 271 (2): 511–522, arXiv:math/0604192, doi:10.1007/s00220-006-0172-4
- with Luis Escauriaza, Carlos Kenig, and Luis Vega: Escauriaza, L.; Kenig, C. E.; Ponce, G.; Vega, L. (2006), "On uniqueness properties of solutions of Schrödinger equations", Communications in Partial Differential Equations, 31 (12): 1811–1823, arXiv:1110.4873, doi:10.1080/03605300500530446, S2CID 121929231
