= Jim Geelen =

- Education: University of Waterloo
- Awards: Fulkerson Prize
- Scientific career
- Fields: Combinatorial optimization
- Workplaces: University of Waterloo
- Doctoral advisor: William H. Cunningham

Jim Geelen is a professor at the Department of Combinatorics and Optimization in the faculty of mathematics at the University of Waterloo, where he holds the Canada Research Chair in Combinatorial optimization. He is known for his work on matroid theory and the extension of the Graph Minors Project to representable matroids. In 2003, he won the Fulkerson Prize with his co-authors A. M. H. Gerards, and A. Kapoor for their research on Rota's excluded minors conjecture. In 2006, he won the Coxeter–James Prize presented by the Canadian Mathematical Society.

He received a Bachelor of Science degree in 1992 from Curtin University in Australia, and obtained his Ph.D. in 1996 at the University of Waterloo under the supervision of William Cunningham. After brief postdoctoral fellowships in the Netherlands, Germany, and Japan, he returned to the University of Waterloo in 1997.
