= Patrick Brosnan =

American mathematician

- Born: 1968 (age 57–58); Philadelphia
- Education: Princeton University; University of Chicago
- Awards: Coxeter–James Prize
- Scientific career
- Fields: Mathematics
- Workplaces: University of Maryland; University of British Columbia
- Doctoral advisor: Spencer Bloch

Patrick Brosnan is an American mathematician, known for his work on motives, Hodge theory, and algebraic groups. He received his Ph.D. from the University of Chicago in 1998 under the direction of Spencer Bloch. Brosnan is the 2009 recipient of the Coxeter–James Prize of the Canadian Mathematical Society.

In 2003, Brosnan (in joint work with Prakash Belkale) disproved the Spanning Tree Conjecture of Maxim Kontsevich.
