= IEEE Transactions on Information Theory =

- Discipline: Electrical engineering, computer science, communications
- Language: English
- Edited by: Lizhong Zheng

Publication details
- Former name: IRE Transactions on Information Theory
- History: 1953–present
- Publisher: IEEE Information Theory Society
- Frequency: Monthly
- Open access: No
- Impact factor: 2.501 (2020)

Standard abbreviations
- ISO 4: IEEE Trans. Inf. Theory
- MathSciNet: IEEE Trans. Inform. Theory

Indexing
- CODEN: IETTAW
- ISSN: 0018-9448 (print); 1557-9654 (web)
- LCCN: 58035217
- OCLC no.: 1752552

Links
- Journal homepage; Online access

IEEE Transactions on Information Theory is a monthly peer-reviewed scientific journal published by the IEEE Information Theory Society. It covers information theory and the mathematics of communications. It was established in 1953 as IRE Transactions on Information Theory. The editor-in-chief is Lizhong Zheng (MIT). As of 2007, the journal allows the posting of preprints on arXiv.

According to Jack van Lint, it is the leading research journal in the whole field of coding theory. A 2006 study using the PageRank network analysis algorithm found that, among hundreds of computer science-related journals, IEEE Transactions on Information Theory had the highest ranking and was thus deemed the most prestigious. ACM Computing Surveys, with the highest impact factor, was deemed the most popular.
