= Sylvia Serfaty =

French mathematician

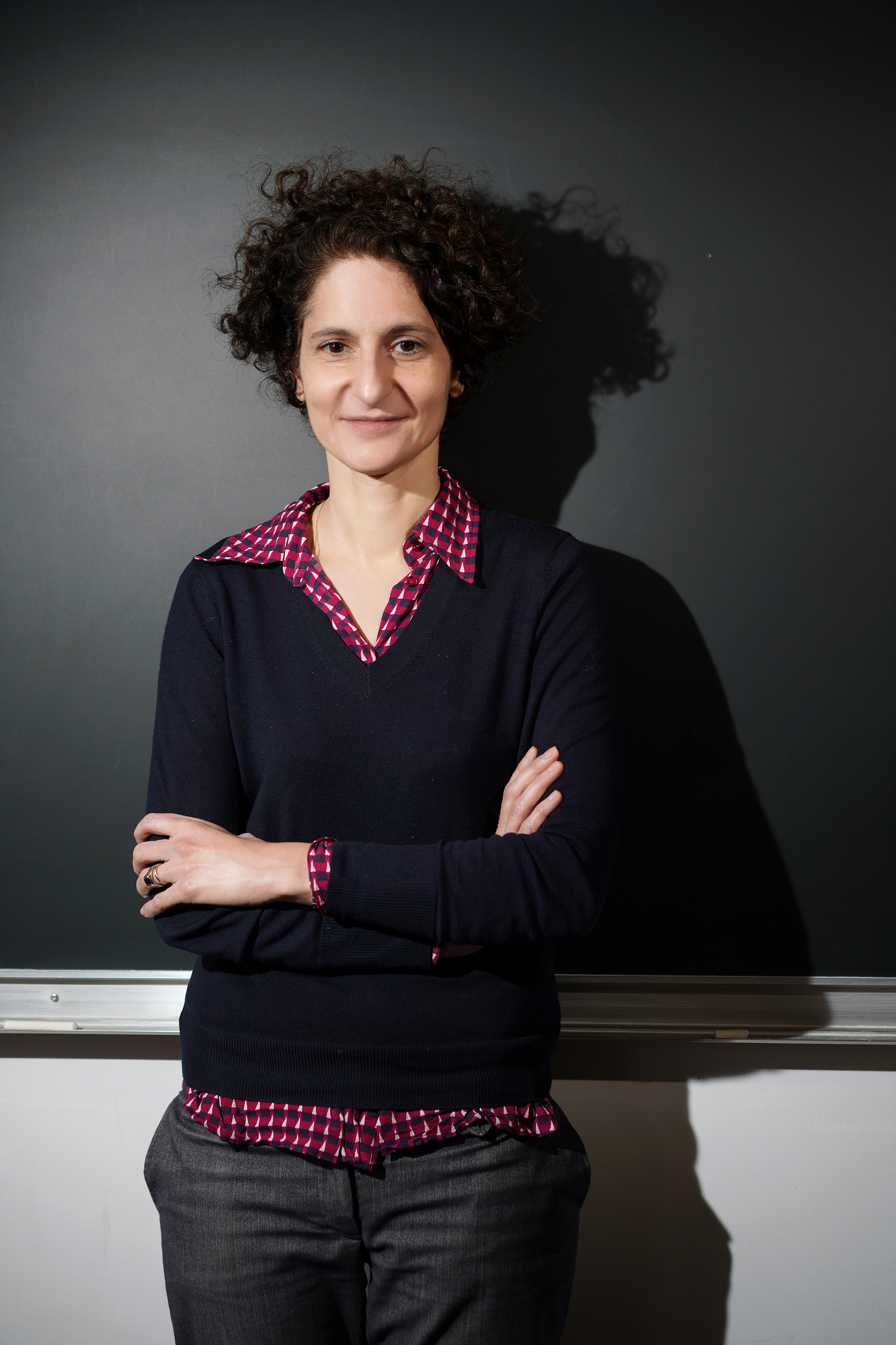
- Born: November 6, 1975 (age 50); Boulogne-Billancourt, France
- Alma mater: Paris-Sud 11 University
- Awards: EMS Prize (2004); Henri Poincaré Prize (2012); Mergier–Bourdeix Prize (2013); Maryam Mirzakhani Prize in Mathematics (2024); Riemann Prize (2025)
- Scientific career
- Fields: Mathematics
- Workplaces: New York University
- Doctoral advisor: Fabrice Bethuel

Sylvia Serfaty (born 1975) is a French mathematician working in the United States. She won the 2004 EMS Prize for her contributions to the Ginzburg–Landau theory, the Henri Poincaré Prize in 2012, and the Mergier–Bourdeix Prize of the French Academy of Sciences in 2013.

== Early life and education ==
Serfaty was born and raised in Paris. She was interested in mathematics since high school.

Serfaty earned her doctorate from Paris-Sud 11 University in 1999, under supervision of Fabrice Bethuel. She then held a teaching position (agrégé préparateur) at the École Normale Supérieure de Cachan. Since 2007 she has held a professorship at the Courant Institute of Mathematical Sciences of NYU.

== Research ==
Serfaty's research is part of the field of partial differential equations and mathematical physics. Her work particularly focuses on the Ginzburg-Landau model of superconductivity and quantum vortices in the Ginzburg–Landau theory. She has also worked on the statistical mechanics of Coulomb-type systems.

In 2007 she published a book on the Ginzburg-Landau theory with Étienne Sandier, Vortices in the Magnetic Ginzburg-Landau Model . She was an invited plenary speaker at the 2018 International Congress of Mathematicians.

She was elected to the American Academy of Arts and Sciences in 2019.

She is one of the editors-in-chief of the scientific journal Probability and Mathematical Physics.

== Awards ==
- European Mathematical Society Prize in 2004
- Henri Poincaré Prize in 2012
- Maryam Mirzakhani Prize in Mathematics in 2024
- Riemann Prize in 2025
