= Maksym Radziwill =

Polish-Canadian mathematician (born 1988)

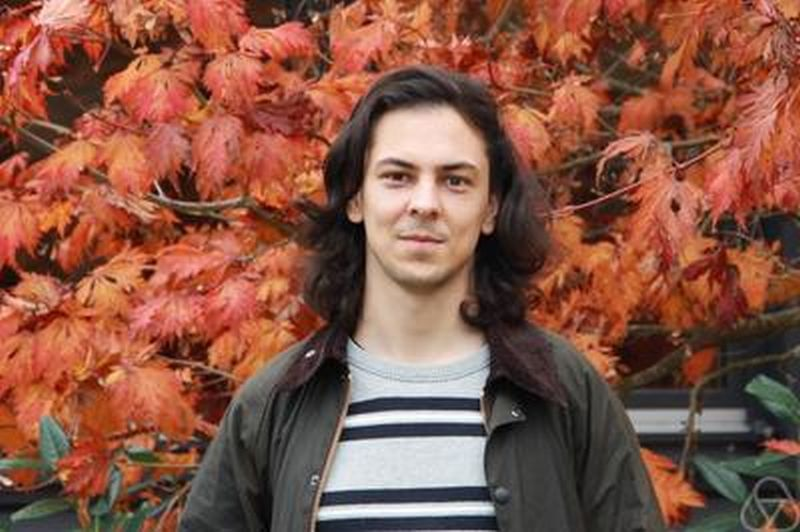
- Radziwill in Oberwolfach 2013
- Born: 24 February 1988 (age 38); Moscow, USSR
- Education: McGill University; Stanford University
- Awards: SASTRA Ramanujan Prize (2016); Sloan Fellowship (2017); Coxeter–James Prize (2018); Ribenboim Prize (2018); Stefan Banach Prize (2018); New Horizons in Mathematics Prize (2019); Cole Prize (2023); Alexanderson Award (2023)
- Scientific career
- Fields: Mathematics
- Workplaces: Northwestern University
- Doctoral advisor: Kannan Soundararajan

Maksym Radziwiłł (born 24 February 1988) is a Polish-Canadian mathematician specializing in number theory. He is currently a professor of mathematics at the New York University.

== Life ==
He was born in Moscow in 1988. His family moved to Poland in 1991 where he graduated from high school and in 2006 moved to Canada. Radziwill graduated from McGill University in Montreal in 2009, and in 2013 earned a PhD under Kannan Soundararajan at Stanford University in California. In 2013–2014, he was at the Institute for Advanced Study in Princeton, New Jersey as a visiting member, and in 2014 became a Hill assistant professor at Rutgers University. In 2016, he became an assistant professor at McGill.

In 2018, he became Professor of Mathematics at California Institute of Technology, and in 2022 he moved to the University of Texas at Austin. In 2023, Radziwill joined Northwestern University as the Wayne and Elizabeth Jones Professor of Mathematics.

In October 2026, among the mathematical papers released by OpenAI was a proof of the quasi-Riemann hypothesis. The breakthrough was possible in part by incorporating techniques developed by Radziwill and Alexander Dunn.

== Honors and awards ==
In 2016, along with Kaisa Matomäki of the University of Turku, Radziwill was awarded the SASTRA Ramanujan Prize.

In February 2017, Maksym Radziwill was awarded the prestigious Sloan Fellowship.

In 2018, he was awarded the Coxeter–James Prize by the Canadian Mathematical Society. In 2018 he was invited with Matomäki to present their work at the International Congress of Mathematicians.

With Matomäki, he is one of five winners of the 2019 New Horizons Prize for Early-Career Achievement in Mathematics, associated with the Breakthrough Prize in Mathematics. In the same year he was awarded the Stefan Banach Prize (2018) of the Polish Mathematical Society. For 2023 he received the Cole Prize in Number Theory of the AMS. In 2023, he was also invited to give a Łojasiewicz Lecture by the Jagiellonian University.
