= Sign sequence =

Sequence of numbers consisting of 1 and -1

In mathematics, a sign sequence, or ±1–sequence or bipolar sequence, is a sequence of numbers, each of which is either 1 or −1. One example is the sequence (1, −1, 1, −1, ...).

Such sequences are commonly studied in discrepancy theory.

== Erdős discrepancy problem ==
Around 1932, mathematician Paul Erdős conjectured that for any infinite ±1-sequence $(x_1, x_2, \ldots)$ and any integer C, there exist integers k and d such that

$$\left| \sum_{i=1}^k x_{i\cdot d} \right| > C.$$

The Erdős discrepancy problem asks for a proof or disproof of this conjecture.

In February 2014, Alexei Lisitsa and Boris Konev of the University of Liverpool showed that every sequence of 1161 or more elements satisfies the conjecture in the special case C = 2, which proves the conjecture for C ≤ 2. This was the best such bound available at the time. Their proof relied on a SAT-solver computer algorithm whose output takes up 13 gigabytes of data, more than the entire text of Wikipedia at that time, so it cannot be independently verified by human mathematicians without further use of a computer.

In September 2015, Terence Tao announced a proof of the conjecture, building on work done in 2010 during Polymath5 (a form of crowdsourcing applied to mathematics) and a suggestion made by German mathematician Uwe Stroinski on Tao's blog. His proof was published in 2016, as the first paper in the new journal Discrete Analysis.

Erdős discrepancy of finite sequences has been proposed as a measure of local randomness in DNA sequences. This is based on the fact that in the case of finite-length sequences discrepancy is bounded, and therefore one can determine the finite sequences with discrepancy less than a certain value. Those sequences will also be those that "avoid" certain periodicities. By comparing the expected versus observed distribution in the DNA or using other correlation measures, one can make conclusions related to the local behavior of DNA sequences.

== Barker codes ==
A Barker code is a sequence of N values of +1 and −1,

$$x_j \text{ for } j=1,\ldots,N,$$

such that

$$\left|\sum_{j=1}^{N-v} x_j x_{j+v}\right| \le 1$$

for all $1 \le v < N$.

Barker codes of lengths 11 and 13 are used in direct-sequence spread spectrum and pulse compression radar systems because of their low autocorrelation properties.

== See also ==
- Binary sequence
- Discrepancy of hypergraphs
- Rudin–Shapiro sequence
