= Wave maps equation =

In mathematical physics, the wave maps equation is a geometric wave equation that solves

$$D^\alpha \partial_\alpha u = 0$$

where $D$ is a connection.

It can be considered a natural extension of the wave equation for Riemannian manifolds.
