= Christoph Thiele =

German mathematician

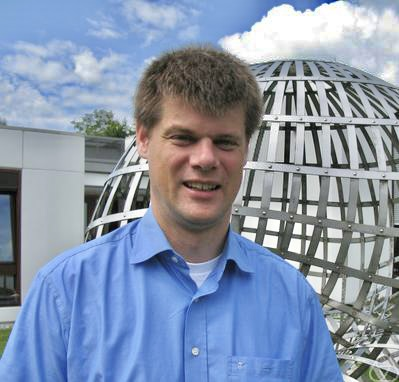
Thiele at Oberwolfach, 2011

Christoph Thiele (born 10. September 1968 in Darmstadt) is a German mathematician working in the field of harmonic analysis. After completing his undergraduate studies at TU Darmstadt and Bielefeld University, he obtained his Ph.D. in 1995 at Yale under the supervision of Ronald Coifman. After spending time at UCLA, where he was promoted to full professor, he occupied the Hausdorff Chair at the University of Bonn.

He is famous for work (joint with Michael Lacey) on the bilinear Hilbert transform and for giving a simplified proof of Carleson's theorem; the techniques in this proof have deeply influenced the field of time–frequency analysis. He was a recipient of the 1996 Salem Prize, an invited speaker at the 2002 International Congress of Mathematicians and a Fellow of the American Mathematical Society.

== Selected publications ==
- Lacey, Michael T. (2004), "Carleson's theorem: proof, complements, variations", Publicacions Matemàtiques, 48 (2): 251–307, arXiv:math/0307008, doi:10.5565/publmat_48204_01, MR 2091007, S2CID 16121272
- Lacey, Michael; Thiele, Christoph (2000), "A proof of boundedness of the Carleson operator", Mathematical Research Letters, 7 (4): 361–370, doi:10.4310/mrl.2000.v7.n4.a1, MR 1783613
