= Luis Vega (mathematician) =

Spanish mathematician

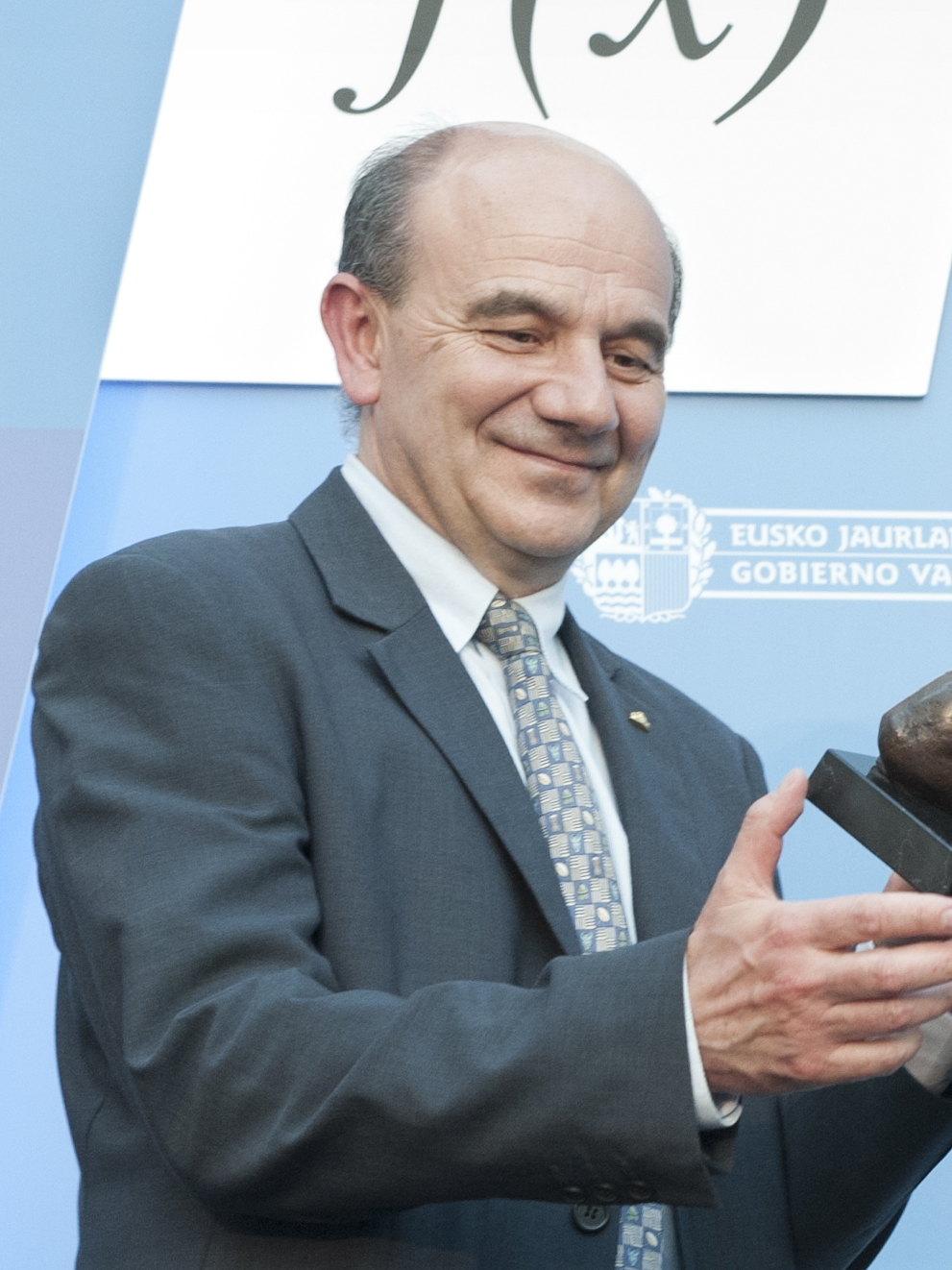
Luis Vega (2013).

Luis Vega González (born 16 July 1960) is a Spanish mathematician, specializing in partial differential equations.

Vega graduated from the Complutense University of Madrid with a bachelor's degree in 1982 and received his doctorate in 1988 from Autonomous University of Madrid (UAM) under Antonio Barba with thesis El multiplicador de Shrödinger la función maximal y los operadores de restriction. Vega was a Dickson Instructor at the University of Chicago as a postdoc. He taught, as an assistant professor, until 1993 at the UAM and then at the University of the Basque Country, where he received a full professorship in 1995. He was the scientific director of the Basque Center for Applied Mathematics (BCAM) from 2013 to 2019.

For brief periods (mostly in the summer) from 2000 to 2008, he was a visiting professor at the University of California, Santa Barbara. He was for brief periods a visiting professor at MSRI, Paris 12, Paris 13, École normale supérieure, École polytechnique, Institut Henri Poincaré, the University of Cergy-Pontoise, the Ennio de Giorgio Center of the University of Pisa, and the University of Washington. He was twice at the Institute for Advanced Study.

He is a co-editor of the Journal of Evolution Equations (since 2009) and the Journal of Fourier Analysis and its Applications (since 2010) and general editor of La Revista Matemática Iberoamericana (since 2011).

In 2006 Vega was Invited Speaker with talk The initial value problem for nonlinear Schrödinger equations at the International Congress of Mathematicians in Madrid, Spain. He was elected a Fellow of the American Mathematical Society and received the Premio Euskadi de Investigación in 2012. He received the Blaise Pascal Medal in 2015.

== Selected publications ==
- with Carlos Kenig, G. Ponce: Smoothing effects and local theory for the generalized nonlinear Schrödinger equations, Invent. Math., Vol. 134, 1998, pp. 489–545
- with L. Escauriaza, Kenig, Ponce: Uniqueness properties of solutions to Schrödinger equations, Bull. Amer. Math. Soc., Vol. 49, 2012, pp. 415–442, Online
