= Communications on Pure and Applied Mathematics =

- Discipline: Pure and applied mathematics
- Language: English
- Edited by: Sylvia Serfaty

Publication details
- Former name: Communications on Applied Mathematics
- History: 1948–2026
- Publisher: John Wiley & Sons on behalf of the Courant Institute of Mathematical Sciences, New York University
- Frequency: Monthly
- Open access: Hybrid
- Impact factor: 3.219 (2020)

Standard abbreviations
- ISO 4: Commun. Pure Appl. Math.
- MathSciNet: Comm. Pure Appl. Math.

Indexing
- CODEN: CPMAMV
- ISSN: 0010-3640 (print); 1097-0312 (web)
- LCCN: 49049208
- OCLC no.: 476148166

Links
- Journal homepage; Online access; Online archive; Journal page at Courant Institute of Mathematical Sciences

Communications on Pure and Applied Mathematics is a monthly peer-reviewed scientific journal which is published by John Wiley & Sons on behalf of the Courant Institute of Mathematical Sciences. It covers research originating from or solicited by the institute, typically in the fields of applied mathematics, mathematical analysis, or mathematical physics. The journal was established in 1948 as the Communications on Applied Mathematics, obtaining its current title the next year. According to the Journal Citation Reports, the journal has a 2020 impact factor of 3.219.

Following increased editorial control and oversight by Wiley, the editorial board stated that they intended to close the journal at the end of 2026, and replace it with one published by the nonprofit Mathematical Sciences Publishers. The new journal will begin publishing in 2027, under the title Courant Journal of Pure and Applied Mathematics.
