= Paneitz operator =

In the mathematical field of differential geometry, the Paneitz operator is a fourth-order differential operator defined on a Riemannian manifold of dimension n. It is named after Stephen Paneitz, who discovered it in 1983, and whose preprint was later published posthumously in Paneitz 2008. In fact, the same operator was found earlier in the context of conformal supergravity by E. Fradkin and A. Tseytlin in 1982 (Phys Lett B 110 (1982) 117 and Nucl Phys B 1982 (1982) 157 ). It is given by the formula

$$P = \Delta^2 - \delta \left\{(n-2)J - 4V\cdot\right\}d + (n-4)Q$$

where Δ is the Laplace–Beltrami operator, d is the exterior derivative, δ is its formal adjoint, V is the Schouten tensor, J is the trace of the Schouten tensor, and the dot denotes tensor contraction on either index. Here Q is the scalar invariant

$$(-4|V|^2+nJ^2+2\Delta J)/4,$$

where Δ is the positive Laplacian. In four dimensions this yields the Q-curvature.

The operator is especially important in conformal geometry, because in a suitable sense it depends only on the conformal structure. Another operator of this kind is the conformal Laplacian. But, whereas the conformal Laplacian is second-order, with leading symbol a multiple of the Laplace–Beltrami operator, the Paneitz operator is fourth-order, with leading symbol the square of the Laplace–Beltrami operator. The Paneitz operator is conformally invariant in the sense that it sends conformal densities of weight 2 − n/2 to conformal densities of weight −2 − n/2. Concretely, using the canonical trivialization of the density bundles in the presence of a metric, the Paneitz operator P can be represented in terms of a representative the Riemannian metric g as an ordinary operator on functions that transforms according under a conformal change g ↦ Ω^{2}g according to the rule

$$\Omega^{n/2+2}P(g)\phi = P(\Omega^2g)\Omega^{n/2-2}\phi.\,$$

The operator was originally derived by working out specifically the lower-order correction terms in order to ensure conformal invariance. Subsequent investigations have situated the Paneitz operator into a hierarchy of analogous conformally invariant operators on densities: the GJMS operators.

The Paneitz operator has been most thoroughly studied in dimension four where it appears naturally in connection with extremal problems for the functional determinant of the Laplacian (via the Polyakov formula; see Branson & Ørsted 1991). In dimension four only, the Paneitz operator is the "critical" GJMS operator, meaning that there is a residual scalar piece (the Q curvature) that can only be recovered by asymptotic analysis. The Paneitz operator appears in extremal problems for the Moser–Trudinger inequality in dimension four as well (Chang 1999)

== CR Paneitz operator ==
There is a close connection between 4 dimensional Conformal Geometry and 3 dimensional CR geometry associated with the study of CR manifolds. There is a naturally defined fourth order operator on CR manifolds introduced by C. Robin Graham and John Lee that has many properties similar to the classical Paneitz operator defined on 4 dimensional Riemannian manifolds. This operator in CR geometry is called the CR Paneitz operator. The operator defined by Graham and Lee though defined on all odd dimensional CR manifolds, is not known to be conformally covariant in real dimension 5 and higher. The conformal covariance of this operator has been established in real dimension 3 by Kengo Hirachi. It is always a non-negative operator in real dimension 5 and higher. Here unlike changing the metric by a conformal factor as in the Riemannian case discussed above, one changes the contact form on the CR 3 manifold by a conformal factor. Non-negativity of the CR Paneitz operator in dimension 3 is a CR invariant condition as proved below. This follows by the conformal covariant properties of the CR Paneitz operator first observed by Kengo Hirachi. Furthermore, the CR Paneitz operator plays an important role in obtaining the sharp eigenvalue lower bound for Kohn's Laplacian. This is a result of Sagun Chanillo, Hung-Lin Chiu and Paul C. Yang. This sharp eigenvalue lower bound is the exact analog in CR Geometry of the famous André Lichnerowicz lower bound for the Laplace–Beltrami operator on compact Riemannian manifolds. It allows one to globally embed, compact, strictly pseudoconvex, abstract CR manifolds into $C^n$. More precisely, the conditions in [3] to embed a CR manifold into $C^n$ are phrased CR invariantly and non-perturbatively. There is also a partial converse of the above result where the authors, J. S. Case, S. Chanillo, P. Yang, obtain conditions that guarantee when embedded, compact CR manifolds have non-negative CR Paneitz operators. The formal definition of the CR Paneitz operator $P_4$ on CR manifolds of real dimension three is as follows( the subscript $4$ is to remind the reader that this is a fourth order operator)

$$P_4\phi=\frac{1}{8}((\Box_b\overline{\Box_b}+\overline{\Box_b}\Box_b)\phi+8Im(A^{11}\phi_1)_1)$$

$\Box_b$ denotes the Kohn Laplacian which plays a fundamental role in CR Geometry and several complex variables and was introduced by Joseph J. Kohn. One may consult The tangential Cauchy–Riemann complex (Kohn Laplacian, Kohn–Rossi complex) for the definition of the Kohn Laplacian. Further, $A^{11}$ denotes the Webster-Tanaka Torsion tensor and $\phi_1$ the covariant derivative of the function $\phi$ with respect to the Webster-Tanaka connection. Accounts of the Webster-Tanaka, connection, Torsion and curvature tensor may be found in articles by John M. Lee and Sidney M. Webster. There is yet another way to view the CR Paneitz operator in dimension 3. John M. Lee constructed a third order operator $P_3$ which has the property that the kernel of $P_3$ consists of exactly the CR pluriharmonic functions (real parts of CR holomorphic functions). The Paneitz operator displayed above is exactly the divergence of this third order operator $P_3$. The third order operator $P_3$ is defined as follows:

$$P_3\phi=({{\phi_{\bar 1}}^{\bar 1}}_{1}+\sqrt{-1}A_{11}\phi^1)\theta^1$$

Here $A_{11}$ is the Webster-Tanaka torsion tensor. The derivatives are taken using the Webster-Tanaka connection and $\theta^1$ is the dual 1-form to the CR-holomorphic tangent vector that defines the CR structure on the compact manifold. Thus $P_3$ sends functions to $(1,0)$ forms. The divergence of such an operator thus will take functions to functions. The third order operator constructed by J. Lee only characterizes CR pluriharmonic functions on CR manifolds of real dimension three.

Hirachi's covariant transformation formula for $P_4$ on three dimensional CR manifolds is as follows. Let the CR manifold be $(M,\theta,J)$, where $\theta$ is the contact form and $J$ the CR structure on the kernel of $\theta$ that is on the contact planes. Let us transform the background contact form $\theta$ by a conformal transformation to $\tilde{\theta}=e^{2f}\theta$. Note this new contact form obtained by a conformal change of the old contact form or background contact form, has not changed the kernel of $\theta$. That is $\tilde{\theta}$ and $\theta$ have the same kernel, i.e. the contact planes have remained unchanged. The CR structure $J$ has been kept unchanged. The CR Paneitz operator $\tilde{P}_4$ for the new contact form $\tilde{\theta}$ is now seen to be related to the CR Paneitz operator for the contact form $\theta$ by the formula of Hirachi:

$$\tilde{P}_4=e^{-4f}P_4$$

Next note the volume forms on the manifold $M$ satisfy

$$d\tilde{V}=\tilde{\theta}\wedge d\tilde{\theta}= e^{4f}\theta\wedge d\theta=e^{4f}dV$$

Using the transformation formula of Hirachi, it follows that,

$$\int_M \tilde{P}_4\phi\phi d\tilde{V}=\int_M P_4\phi\phi dV$$

Thus we easily conclude that:

$$\int_M P_4\phi\phi dV$$

is a CR invariant. That is the integral displayed above has the same value for different contact forms describing the same CR structure $J$.

The operator $P_4$ is a real self-adjoint operator. On CR manifolds like $S^3$ where the Webster-Tanaka torsion tensor is zero, it is seen from the formula displayed above that only the leading terms involving the Kohn Laplacian survives. Next from the tensor commutation formulae given in [5], one can easily check that the operators $\Box_b, \overline{\Box_b}$ commute when the Webster-Tanaka torsion tensor $A_{11}$ vanishes. More precisely one has

$$[\Box_b,\overline{\Box_b}]=4\sqrt{-1}Im Q$$

where

$$Q\phi=2\sqrt{-1}(A_{11}\phi_1)_1$$

Thus $\Box_b,\overline{\Box_b}$ are simultaneously diagonalizable under the zero torsion assumption. Next note that $\Box_b$ and $\overline{\Box_b}$ have the same sequence of eigenvalues that are also perforce real. Thus we conclude from the formula for $P_4$ that CR structures having zero torsion have CR Paneitz operators that are non-negative. The article [4] among other things shows that real ellipsoids in $C^2$ carry a CR structure inherited from the complex structure of $C^2$ whose CR Paneitz operator is non-negative. This CR structure on ellipsoids has non-vanishing Webster-Tanaka torsion. Thus [4] provides the first examples of CR manifolds where the CR Paneitz operator is non-negative and the Torsion tensor too does not vanish. Since we have observed above that the CR Paneitz is the divergence of an operator whose kernel is the pluriharmonic functions, it also follows that the kernel of the CR Paneitz operator contains all CR Pluriharmonic functions. So the kernel of the CR Paneitz operator in sharp contrast to the Riemannian case, has an infinite dimensional kernel. Results on when the kernel is exactly the pluriharmonic functions, the nature and role of the supplementary space in the kernel etc., may be found in the article cited as [4] below.

One of the principal applications of the CR Paneitz operator and the results in [3] are to the CR analog of the Positive Mass theorem due to Jih-Hsin Cheng, Andrea Malchiodi and Paul C. Yang. This allows one to obtain results on the CR Yamabe problem.

More facts related to the role of the CR Paneitz operator in CR geometry can be obtained from the article CR manifold.

== See also ==
- Calabi conjecture
- Monge–Ampère equations
- Positive mass conjecture
- Yamabe conjecture
