= Wootters =

Wootters is a surname. Notable people with the surname include:

- Mary Wootters, American coding theorist and computer scientist
- William Wootters (born 1951), American quantum information theorist
