= Stefan Bergman Prize =

Mathematics award

- Description: Mathematics prize awarded for research in the theory of the kernel function and function-theoretic methods in elliptic partial differential equations
- Country: United States
- Presented by: American Mathematical Society

The Stefan Bergman Prize is a mathematics award, funded by the estate of the widow of mathematician Stefan Bergman and supported by the American Mathematical Society. The award is granted for mathematical research in: "1) the theory of the kernel function and its applications in real and complex analysis; or 2) function-theoretic methods in the theory of partial differential equations of elliptic type with attention to Bergman's operator method."

The award is given in honor of Stefan Bergman, a mathematician known for his work on complex analysis. Recipients of the prize are selected by a committee of judges appointed by the American Mathematical Society.

== Criteria and scope ==
The monetary value of the prize is variable and based on the income from the prize fund; in 2005 the award was valued at approximately $17,000.

== Laureates ==
- 1989 David W. Catlin
- 1991 Steven R. Bell, Ewa Ligocka
- 1992 Charles Fefferman
- 1993 Yum-Tong Siu
- 1994 John Erik Fornæss
- 1995 Harold P. Boas, Emil J. Straube
- 1997 David E. Barrett, Michael Christ
- 1999 John P. D'Angelo
- 2000 Masatake Kuranishi
- 2001 László Lempert, Sidney Webster
- 2003 M. Salah Baouendi, Linda Preiss Rothschild
- 2004 Joseph J. Kohn
- 2005 Elias Stein
- 2006 Kengo Hirachi
- 2007-08 Alexander Nagel, Stephen Wainger
- 2009 Ngaiming Mok, Duong H. Phong
- 2011 Gennadi Henkin
- 2012 David Jerison, John M. Lee
- 2013 Xiaojun Huang, Steve Zelditch
- 2014 Sławomir Kołodziej, Takeo Ohsawa
- 2015 Eric Bedford, Jean-Pierre Demailly
- 2016 Charles L. Epstein, François Trèves
- 2017 Bo Berndtsson, Nessim Sibony
- 2018 Johannes Sjöstrand
- 2019 Franc Forstnerič, Mei-Chi Shaw
- 2020 Aline Bonami, Peter Ebenfelt

== See also ==
- List of mathematics awards
