= CR manifold =

Differentiable manifold

In mathematics, a CR manifold, or Cauchy–Riemann manifold, is a differentiable manifold together with a geometric structure modeled on that of a real hypersurface in a complex vector space, or more generally modeled on an edge of a wedge.

Formally, a CR manifold is a differentiable manifold M together with a preferred complex distribution L, or in other words a complex subbundle of the complexified tangent bundle $\Complex TM = TM \otimes_\mathbb{R} \Complex$ such that

- $[L,L]\subseteq L$ (L is formally integrable)
- $L\cap\bar{L}=\{0\}$.

The subbundle L is called a CR structure on the manifold M. It gives rise to a canonical differential operator mapping locally defined functions to local sections of the dual bundle $L^*$. This is the $\overline{\partial_b}$-operator; it is defined by

$\overline{\partial_b} f=df\upharpoonright_{\overline{L}}$.

The abbreviation CR stands for "Cauchy–Riemann" or "Complex-Real". A CR-function, which is a generalization of a holomorphic function, is a solution to the system of equations $\overline{\partial_b} f=0$.

== Introduction and motivation ==
The notion of a CR structure attempts to describe intrinsically the property of being a hypersurface (or certain real submanifolds of higher codimension) in complex space by studying the properties of holomorphic vector fields which are tangent to the hypersurface.

Suppose for instance that M is the hypersurface of $\Complex^2$ given by the equation

$$F(z,w) := |z|^2+|w|^2=1,$$

where z and w are the usual complex coordinates on $\Complex^2$. The holomorphic tangent bundle of $\Complex^2$ consists of all linear combinations of the vectors

$$\frac{\partial}{\partial z},\quad \frac{\partial}{\partial w}.$$

The distribution L on M consists of all combinations of these vectors which are tangent to M. The tangent vectors must annihilate the defining equation for M, so L consists of complex scalar multiples of

$$\bar{w}\frac{\partial}{\partial z}-\bar{z}\frac{\partial}{\partial w}.$$

In particular, L consists of the holomorphic vector fields which annihilate F. Note that L gives a CR structure on M, for [L,L] = 0 (since L is one-dimensional) and $L\cap\bar{L}=\{0\}$ since ∂/∂z and ∂/∂w are linearly independent of their complex conjugates.

More generally, suppose that M is a real hypersurface in $\Complex^n,$ with defining equation F(z_{1}, ..., z_{n}) = 0. Then the CR structure L consists of those linear combinations of the basic holomorphic vectors on $\Complex^n$:

$$\frac{\partial}{\partial z_1}, \ldots, \frac{\partial}{\partial z_n}$$

which annihilate the defining function. In this case, $L\cap\bar{L}=\{0\}$ for the same reason as before. Moreover, [L,L] ⊂ L since the commutator of holomorphic vector fields annihilating F is again a holomorphic vector field annihilating F.

=== Embedded and abstract CR manifolds ===
There is a sharp contrast between the theories of embedded CR manifolds (hypersurface and edges of wedges in complex space) and abstract CR manifolds (those given by the complex distribution L). Many of the formal geometrical features are similar. These include:

- A notion of convexity (supplied by the Levi form)
- A canonical differential operator, analogous to the Dolbeault operator, and an associated cohomology (the tangential Cauchy–Riemann or $\overline{\partial_b}$-complex).

Embedded CR manifolds possess some additional structure, though: a Neumann and Dirichlet problem for the Cauchy–Riemann equations.

This article first treats the geometry of embedded CR manifolds, shows how to define these structures intrinsically, and then generalizes these to the abstract setting.

== Embedded CR manifolds ==
=== Preliminaries ===
Embedded CR manifolds are, first and foremost, submanifolds of $\Complex^n.$ Define a pair of subbundles of the complexified tangent bundle $\Complex \otimes T\Complex^n$ by:

- $T^{(1,0)}\Complex^n$ consists of the complex vectors annihilating the antiholomorphic functions. In the holomorphic coordinates:

$$T^{(1,0)}\Complex^n = \operatorname{span}\left(\frac{\partial}{\partial z_1},\dots,\frac{\partial}{\partial z_n}\right).$$

- $T^{(0,1)}\Complex^n$ consists of the complex vectors annihilating the holomorphic functions. In coordinates:

$$T^{(0,1)}\Complex^n = \operatorname{span}\left(\frac{\partial}{\partial \bar{z}_1},\dots,\frac{\partial}{\partial \bar{z}_n}\right).$$

Also relevant are the characteristic annihilators from the Dolbeault complex:

- $\Omega^{(1,0)}\Complex^n = \left(T^{(0,1)}\Complex^n \right )^\bot.$ In coordinates,

$$\Omega^{(1,0)}\Complex^n = \operatorname{span}(dz_1,\dots,dz_n).$$

- $\Omega^{(0,1)}\Complex^n = \left(T^{(1,0)}\Complex^n \right )^\bot.$ In coordinates,

$$\Omega^{(0,1)}\Complex^n = \operatorname{span}(d\bar{z}_1,\dots,d\bar{z}_n).$$

The exterior products of these are denoted by the self-evident notation Ω^{(p,q)}, and the Dolbeault operator and its complex conjugate map between these spaces via:

$$\partial : \Omega^{(p,q)} \to \Omega^{(p+1,q)}$$
$$\bar{\partial} : \Omega^{(p,q)} \to \Omega^{(p,q+1)}$$

Furthermore, there is a decomposition of the usual exterior derivative via $d = \partial + \bar{\partial}$.

=== Real submanifolds of complex space ===
Let $M \subset \Complex^n$ be a real submanifold, defined locally as the locus of a system of smooth real-valued functions

$$F_1 =0, F_2 =0, \ldots, F_k =0.$$

Suppose that the complex-linear part of the differential of this system has maximal rank, in the sense that the differentials satisfy the following independence condition:

$$\partial F_1\wedge\dots \wedge \partial F_k \not= 0.$$

Note that this condition is strictly stronger than needed to apply the implicit function theorem: in particular, M is a manifold of real dimension $2n-k.$ We say that M is a generic embedded CR submanifold of CR codimension k. The adjective generic indicates that the tangent space $TM$ spans the tangent space of $\Complex^n$ over complex numbers. In most applications, k = 1, in which case the manifold is said to be of hypersurface type.

Let $L \subset T^{(1,0)}\Complex^n|_M$ be the subbundle of vectors annihilating all of the defining functions $F_1, \ldots, F_k.$ Note that, by the usual considerations for integrable distributions on hypersurfaces, L is involutive. Moreover, the independence condition implies that L is a bundle of constant rank n − k.

Henceforth, suppose that k = 1 (so that the CR manifold is of hypersurface type), unless otherwise noted.

=== The Levi form ===
Let M be a CR manifold of hypersurface type with single defining function F = 0. The Levi form of M, named after Eugenio Elia Levi, is the Hermitian 2-form

$$h=i\,\partial\bar{\partial}F|_{L\wedge \bar L}.$$

This determines a metric on L. M is said to be strictly pseudoconvex (from the side F<0) if h is positive definite (or pseudoconvex in case h is positive semidefinite). Many of the analytic existence and uniqueness results in the theory of CR manifolds depend on the pseudoconvexity.

This nomenclature comes from the study of pseudoconvex domains: M is the boundary of a (strictly) pseudoconvex domain in $\Complex^n$ if and only if it is (strictly) pseudoconvex as a CR manifold from the side of the domain. (See plurisubharmonic functions and Stein manifold.)

== Abstract CR structures ==
An abstract CR structure on a real manifold M of real dimension n consists of a complex subbundle L of the complexified tangent bundle which is formally integrable, in the sense that [L,L] ⊂ L, which has zero intersection with its complex conjugate. The CR codimension of the CR structure is $k = n - 2 \dim L,$ where dim L is the complex dimension. In case k = 1, the CR structure is said to be of hypersurface type. Most examples of abstract CR structures are of hypersurface type.

=== The Levi form and pseudoconvexity ===
Suppose that M is a CR manifold of hypersurface type. The Levi form is the vector valued 2-form, defined on L, with values in the line bundle

$$V = \frac{TM\otimes \Complex}{L\oplus\overline{L}}$$

given by

$$h(v,w) = \frac{1}{2i}[v,\overline{w}] \mod L\oplus\overline{L},\quad v,w\in L.$$

h defines a sesquilinear form on L since it does not depend on how v and w are extended to sections of L, by the integrability condition. This form extends to a hermitian form on the bundle $L\oplus\overline{L}$ by the same expression. The extended form is also sometimes referred to as the Levi form.

The Levi form can alternatively be characterized in terms of duality. Consider the line subbundle of the complex cotangent bundle annihilating V

$$H_0M = V^* = (L\oplus\overline{L})^\perp\sub T^*M\otimes \Complex.$$

For each local section α ∈ Γ(H_{0}M), let

$$h_\alpha(v,w) = d\alpha(v,\overline{w}) = -\alpha([v,\overline{w}]),\quad v,w\in L\oplus\overline{L}.$$

The form h_{α} is a complex-valued hermitian form associated to α. The 1-form $\alpha$ is real; the complex hyperplane bundle $L\oplus\overline{L}$ is the complexification of the real hyperplane bundle, $V_{\mathbb R} = \ker\alpha$. In the strictly pseudoconvex case this bundle defines a contact structure on $M$, with $\alpha$ a contact form. The conformal class of the contact form is well defined.

A choice of contact form defines a vector field, $T$ transverse to the contact structure, $V_{\mathbb R}$. This vector field, called the Reeb vector field, is defined by

$i_{T}d\alpha=0,\quad \alpha(T)=1$.

Generalizations of the Levi form exist when the manifold is not of hypersurface type, in which case the form no longer assumes values in a line bundle, but rather in a vector bundle. One may then speak, not of a Levi form, but of a collection of Levi forms for the structure.

On abstract CR manifolds, of strongly pseudo-convex type, the Levi form gives rise to a pseudo-Hermitian metric on $L$. If $Z, W\in L$, then we define the hermitian inner product by setting

$\langle Z,W\rangle =\frac{1}{i}d\alpha(Z,\overline{W})$.

This only defines a hermitian metric for the holomorphic tangent vectors and so is degenerate. We can extend it to define a Riemannian metric on the real tangent space, $TM$, by observing that any vector field $X\in TM$ can be expressed as

$X=Z_X+\overline{Z}_X+a_X T\text{ where }Z_X\in L, a_X\in{\mathbb R}$; if $X, Y\in TM\text{ then }\langle X,Y\rangle =\Re \langle Z_X,Z_W\rangle+a_Xa_Y$.

This defines a Riemannian metric on $TM$. The Levi form gives the length of the projection of $[v,\overline{w}]$ in the $T$-direction.

One can then define a connection and torsion and related curvature tensors for example the Ricci curvature and scalar curvature using this metric. This gives rise to an analogous CR Yamabe problem first studied by David Jerison and John Lee. The connection associated to CR manifolds was first defined and studied by Sidney M. Webster in his thesis on the study of the equivalence problem and independently also defined and studied by Tanaka. Accounts of these notions may be found in the articles. A strictly pseudoconvex CR-manifold also has a canonical Cartan connection, which is defined independently of the choice of contact form. This connection was introduced in 3-dimensions by Cartan, and in higher dimensions by S.S. Chern and J. Moser. The Cartan-Chern-Moser connection and its curvature are invariant under CR-diffeomorphisms.

One of the basic questions of CR Geometry is to ask when a smooth manifold endowed with an abstract CR structure can be realized as an embedded manifold in some $\Complex^{n}$. Thus not only are we embedding the manifold, but we also demand for global embedding that the map embedding the abstract manifold in $\Complex^n$ must pull back the induced CR structure of the embedded manifold( coming from the fact that it sits in $\Complex^n$) so that the pull back CR structure agrees with the abstract CR structure. The coordinate functions of such a map are CR-functions, that is in the null-space of the $\bar{\partial}_b$-operator. It is easy to show that this null--space is an algebra with point-wise multiplication. One can consider both the questions of local embeddability and of global embeddability.

Louis Boutet de Monvel proved that an abstractly defined, compact strongly pseudoconvex CR-manifold, of real dimension 5 or higher is globally embeddable. His work shows that if the $\Box_b$-operator, (see below) acting on functions, has a closed range in $L^2$, then the CR-manifold is globally embeddable.

In dimension 3, there are obstructions to global embeddability. The standard CR-structure on the three sphere $S^3$ is spanned by the complex vector field, $\overline{Z}=z_1\partial_{\overline{z}_2}-z_2\partial_{\overline{z}_1}$. For $\epsilon\in{\mathbb C}\setminus \{0\}$, with $|\epsilon|<1$, the complex vector fields $\overline{Z}_{\epsilon}=\overline{Z}+\epsilon Z$ define abstract CR structures on the 3-sphere, which are not globally embeddable. These are often called the Rossi example, though they go back to earlier work of Hans Grauert and appear in a paper by Aldo Andreotti and Yum-Tong Siu. These examples are locally embeddable in a neighborhood of every point, but not globally embeddable: the algebra of CR-functions does not separate points. As shown by Burns all solutions to $\overline{Z}_{\epsilon}f=0$ are even functions.

Joseph J. Kohn showed that global embeddability implies that the Kohn Laplacian, $\Box_b$, (see below) acting on functions has a closed range in $L^2$. Combining this with the result of Boutet de Monvel, it follows that global embeddability of a compact strictly pseudoconvex CR-manifold is equivalent to the closedness of the range of $\Box_b$, acting on functions. Thus the closed range property for $\Box_b$ is CR-invariant.

Note that the set of embeddable perturbations of the CR-structure on a compact 3-dimensional manifold is of infinite dimension and also of infinite co-dimension. Under a positivity condition on the Fourier coefficients of the perturbation term, Daniel Burns and Charles Epstein proved global embeddability for small perturbations of the standard CR structure on the 3-dimensional sphere. Indeed, they show that the entire algebra of CR-functions deforms stably under small "positive perturbations." Shortly thereafter Lempert proved that any small embeddable perturbation of the CR-structure on a compact, strictly pseudocovex real hypersurface in $\Complex^2$ can be embedded as a small perturbation of the original embedding. The paper also conjectures a normal form for such perturbations, that includes the positive, embeddable perturbations along with an infinite number of obstructions to embeddability. The existence of this normal form was proved by John Bland.

In dimension 3, a non-perturbative set of conditions that are CR invariant has been found by Sagun Chanillo, Hung-Lin Chiu and Paul C. Yang that guarantees global embeddability for abstract strongly pseudo-convex CR structures defined on compact manifolds. Under the hypothesis that the CR Paneitz Operator is non-negative and the CR Yamabe constant is positive, one has global embedding. The second condition can be weakened to a non-CR invariant condition by demanding the Webster curvature of the abstract manifold be bounded below by a positive constant. It allows the authors to get a sharp lower bound on the first positive eigenvalue of Kohn's Laplacian. The lower bound is the analog in CR Geometry of the André Lichnerowicz bound for the first positive eigenvalue of the Laplace–Beltrami operator for compact manifolds in Riemannian geometry. Non-negativity of the CR Paneitz operator in dimension 3 is a CR invariant condition as follows by the conformal covariant properties of the CR Paneitz operator on CR manifolds of real dimension 3, first observed by Kengo Hirachi. The CR version of the Paneitz operator, the so-called CR Paneitz Operator first appears in a work of C. Robin Graham and John Lee. The operator is not known to be conformally covariant in real dimension 5 and higher, but only in real dimension 3. It is always a non-negative operator in real dimension 5 and higher.

One can ask if all compactly embedded CR manifolds in $\Complex^2$ have non-negative Paneitz operators. This is a sort of converse question to the embedding theorems discussed above. In this direction Jeffrey Case, Sagun Chanillo and Paul C. Yang have proved a stability theorem. That is, if one starts with a family of compact CR manifolds embedded in $\Complex^2,$ and the CR structure of the family $J_t$ changes in a real-analytic way with respect to the parameter $t,$ and the CR Yamabe constant of the family of manifolds is uniformly bounded below by a positive constant, then the CR Paneitz operator remains non-negative for the entire family, provided one member of the family has its CR Paneitz operator non-negative. The converse question was finally solved by Yuya Takeuchi. He proved that for embedded, compact CR-3 manifolds that are strictly pseudoconvex, the CR Paneitz operator associated to this embedded manifold is non-negative.

The realization of the abstract CR manifold as a smooth manifold in some $\Complex^n$ will bound a Complex variety which in general may have singularities. This is the content of the Complex Plateau problem studied in the article by F. Reese Harvey and H. Blaine Lawson. There is also further work on the Complex Plateau problem by Stephen S.-T. Yau.

Local embedding of abstract CR structures is not true in real dimension 3, because of an example of Louis Nirenberg(the book by Chen and Mei-Chi Shaw referred below also carries a presentation of Nirenberg's proof). The example of L. Nirenberg may be viewed as a smooth perturbation of the non-solvable complex vector field of Hans Lewy. One can start with the anti-holomorphic vector field $\overline{L}$ on the Heisenberg group given by

$$\overline{L}=\frac{\partial}{\partial \overline{z}}-\imath z\frac{\partial}{\partial t}, \qquad (z,t)\in\Complex\times\R,\imath=\sqrt{-1}.$$

The vector field defined above has two linearly independent first integrals. That is there are two solutions to the homogeneous equation,

$$\overline{L}Z_i=0,i=1,2, \qquad Z_1=z, Z_2=t+\imath |z|^2, dZ_1\wedge dZ_2\not=0.$$

Since we are in real dimension three the formal integrability condition is simply,

$$\left [\overline{L}, \overline{L} \right ]=0$$

which is automatic. Notice the Levi form is strictly positive definite as a simple calculation gives,

$$\left [\overline{L}, L \right ]= 2i\frac{\partial}{\partial t},$$

where the holomorphic vector field L is given by,

$$L=\frac{\partial}{\partial z}+\imath\overline{z}\frac{\partial}{\partial t}.$$

The first integrals which are linearly independent allow us to realize the CR structure as a graph in $\Complex^2$ given by

$$(z,t)\to (z,t+\imath |z|^2)$$

The CR structure then is seen to be nothing but the restriction of the Complex structure of $\Complex^2$ to the graph. Nirenberg constructs a single, non-vanishing complex vector field $P,$ defined in a neighborhood of the origin in $\Complex\times\R.$ He then shows that if $Pu=0$, then $u$ has to be a constant. Thus the vector field $P$ has no first integrals. The vector field $P$ is created from the anti-holomorphic vector field for the Heisenberg group displayed above by perturbing it by a smooth complex-valued function $\phi$ as displayed below:

$$P=\overline{L}+\phi(z,\overline{z},t)\frac{\partial}{\partial t}$$

Thus this new vector field P, has no first integrals other than constants and so it is not possible to realize this perturbed CR structure in any way as a graph in any $\Complex^n.$ The work of L. Nirenberg has been extended to a generic result by Howard Jacobowitz and François Trèves. In real dimension 9 and higher, local embedding of abstract strictly pseudo-convex CR structures is true by the work of Masatake Kuranishi and in real dimension 7 by the work of Akahori A simplified presentation of Kuranishi's proof is due to Webster.

The problem of local embedding remains open in real dimension 5.

=== The tangential Cauchy–Riemann complex (Kohn Laplacian, Kohn–Rossi complex) ===
First of all one needs to define a co-boundary operator $\overline{\partial_b}$. For CR manifolds that arise as boundaries of complex manifolds, one may view this operator as the restriction of $\overline{\partial}$ from the interior to the boundary. The subscript b is to remind one that we are on the boundary. The co-boundary operator takes (0,p) forms to (0,p+1) forms. One can even define the co-boundary operator for an abstract CR manifold even if it is not the boundary of a complex variety. This can be done using the Webster connection. The co-boundary operator $\overline{\partial_b}$ forms a complex, that is $\overline{\partial_b}\circ\overline{\partial_b}=0$. This complex is called the Tangential Cauchy–Riemann complex or the Kohn–Rossi complex. Investigation of this complex and the study of the Cohomology groups of this complex was done in a fundamental paper by Joseph J. Kohn and Hugo Rossi.

Associated to the Tangential CR complex is a fundamental object in CR Geometry and Several Complex Variables, the Kohn Laplacian. It is defined as:

$$\Box_b=\overline{\partial_b}\overline{\partial_b}^\star+\overline{\partial_b}^\star\overline{\partial_b}$$

Here $\overline{\partial_b}^\star$ denotes the formal adjoint of $\overline{\partial_b}$ with respect to $L^2(M)$ where the volume form may be derived from a contact form which is associated to the CR structure. See for example the paper of J.M. Lee in the American J. referred below. Note the Kohn Laplacian takes (0,p) forms to (0,p) forms. Functions that are annihilated by the Kohn Laplacian are called CR functions. They are the boundary analogs of holomorphic functions. The real parts of the CR functions are called the CR pluriharmonic functions. The Kohn Laplacian $\Box_b$ is a non-negative, formally self-adjoint operator. It is degenerate and has a characteristic set where its symbol vanishes. On a compact, strongly pseudo-convex abstract CR manifold, it has discrete positive eigenvalues which go to infinity and also approach zero. The kernel consists of the CR functions and so is infinite dimensional. If the positive eigenvalues of the Kohn Laplacian are bounded below by a positive constant, then the Kohn Laplacian has closed range and conversely. Thus for embedded CR structures using the result of Kohn stated above, we conclude that the compact CR structure that is strongly pseudoconvex is embedded if and only if the Kohn Laplacian has positive eigenvalues that are bounded below by a positive constant. The Kohn Laplacian always has the eigenvalue zero corresponding to the CR functions.

Estimates for $\Box_b$ and $\overline{\partial_b}$ have been obtained in various function spaces in various settings. These estimates are easiest to derive when the manifold is strongly pseudoconvex, for then one can replace the manifold by osculating it to a high enough order with the Heisenberg group. Then using the group property and attendant convolution structure of the Heisenberg group, one can write down inverses/parametrices or relative parametrices to $\Box_b$.

A concrete example of the $\overline{\partial_b}$ operator can be provided on the Heisenberg group. Consider the general Heisenberg group $\Complex^n\times \R$ and consider the antiholomorphic vector fields which are also group left invariant,

$$\overline{L}_j= \frac{\partial}{\partial \overline{z_j}}-\imath z_j\frac{\partial}{\partial t}, j=1,2,\ldots ,n, (z_1,z_2,\ldots, z_n)\in\Complex^n, t\in \R.$$

Then for a function u we have the (0,1) form $\omega$

$$\omega =\overline{\partial_b}u=\sum_{j=1}^n \overline{L_j}u\ d\overline{z_j}.$$

Since $\overline{\partial_b}^\star$ vanishes on functions, we also have the following formula for the Kohn Laplacian for functions on the Heisenberg group:

$$\Box_b=-\sum_{j=1}^n L_j \overline{L_j}$$

where

$$L_j=\frac{\partial}{\partial z_j}+\imath\overline{z_j}\frac{\partial}{\partial t},$$

are the group left invariant, holomorphic vector fields on the Heisenberg group. The expression for the Kohn Laplacian above can be re-written as follows. First it is easily checked that

$$[L_j,\overline{L_j}]=-2\imath T, T=\frac{\partial}{\partial t},j=1,2,\ldots,n$$

Thus we have by an elementary calculation:

$$\Box_b=-\frac{1}{2}\sum_{j=1}^n(L_j\overline{L_j}+\overline{L_j}L_j)+\imath nT$$

The first operator on the right is a real operator and in fact it is the real part of the Kohn Laplacian. It is called the sub-Laplacian. It is a primary example of what is called a Hörmander sums of squares operator. It is obviously non-negative as can be seen via an integration by parts. Some authors define the sub-Laplacian with an opposite sign. In our case we have specifically:

$$\Delta_b=-\frac{1}{2}\sum_{j=1}^n (L_j\overline{L_j}+\overline{L_j}L_j)$$

where the symbol $\Delta_b$ is the traditional symbol for the sub-Laplacian. Thus

$$\Box_b=\Delta_b+\imath nT$$

== Examples ==
The canonical example of a compact CR manifold is the real $2n+1$ sphere as a submanifold of $\Complex^{n+1}$. The bundle $L$ described above is given by

$$L = \Complex TS^{2n+1} \cap T^{1,0}\Complex^{n+1}$$

where $T^{1,0}\Complex^{n+1}$ is the bundle of holomorphic vectors. The real form of this is given by $P=\Re (L\oplus \bar{L})$, the bundle given at a point $p\in S^{2n+1}$ concretely in terms of the complex structure, $I$, on $\Complex^{n+1}$ by

$$P_p = \{ X\in T_pS^{2n+1} : IX \in T_pS^{2n+1}\subset T_p\Complex^{n+1}\},$$

and the almost complex structure on $P$ is just the restriction of $I$. The Sphere is an example of a CR manifold with constant positive Webster curvature and having zero Webster torsion. The Heisenberg group is an example of a non-compact CR manifold with zero Webster torsion and zero Webster curvature. The unit circle bundle over compact Riemann surfaces with genus strictly greater than 1 also provides examples of CR manifolds which are strongly pseudoconvex and have zero Webster torsion and constant negative Webster curvature. These spaces can be used as comparison spaces in studying geodesics and volume comparison theorems on CR manifolds with zero Webster torsion akin to the H.E. Rauch comparison theorem in Riemannian Geometry.

In recent years, other aspects of analysis on the Heisenberg group have been also studied, like minimal surfaces in the Heisenberg group, the Bernstein problem in the Heisenberg group and curvature flows.

== See also ==
- Eugenio Elia Levi
- Pseudoconvexity
