= UBIT =

UBIT may refer to:

- Unrelated Business Income Tax, a U.S. tax on a certain activities of tax-exempt organizations
- U-bit, a proposed theoretical entity in quantum mechanics
- UBIT, an acronym for the Department of Computer Science at the University of Karachi
- University of Buffalo Information Technology, which provides technological services and support at the University of Buffalo
