= John D'Angelo =

American mathematician

- Born: March 5. 1951; Philadelphia, Pa. USA
- Education: Univ. of Pennsylvania (BA) Princeton University (PhD )
- Known for: Research in Functions of several complex variables, D'Angelo Type, Rational Sphere Maps
- Awards: Fellow of the American Mathematical Society (2014); Stefan Bergman Prize (1999)
- Scientific career
- Fields: Functions of several complex variables
- Workplaces: Massachusetts Institute of Technology; University of Illinois, Champaign-Urbana
- Doctoral advisor: Joseph J. Kohn

John D'Angelo is an American mathematician. He is currently Professor Emeritus in the Department of Mathematics at the University of Illinois at Champaign-Urbana.

== Education ==
D'Angelo received his PhD from Princeton University in 1976, under the direction of J.J. Kohn. He was then a C.L.E. Moore Instructor at MIT from 1976 to 1978, becoming an Assistant Professor at University of Illinois in 1978, and was promoted to Full Professor in 1987. He became an emeritus professor in 2018.

== Awards and honors ==
D'Angelo was the recipient of the Stefan Bergman Prize in 1999 for "remarkable geometric insight that has led him to make several spectacular contributions to complex analysis". In 2014 he became a fellow of the American Mathematical Society: "For contributions to several complex variables and Cauchy-Riemann geometry, and for his inspiration of students".

== Research ==
D'Angelo's early work involved the study of order of contact between analytic subvarieties and boundaries of weakly pseudoconvex domains, which resulted in the definition and analysis of what are now known as points of D'Angelo finite type. The D'Angelo type provides a quantitative measure of the order contact between the boundary of the domain and analytic subvarieties. D'Angelo's work uses analysis and commutative algebra. A domain all of whose boundary points have finite D'Angelo type has analytic properties, with respect to holomorphic functions, that are quite similar to strictly pseudoconvex domains. David Catlin was able to prove regularity estimates for the $\bar{\partial}$-Neumann problem, the Bergman projection, and related operators for domains all of whose boundary points satisfy a condition closely related to finite D'Angelo type.

Since 1990 D'Angelo's work has been focused on problems connected to the existence of proper holomorphic mappings between balls of different dimensions. That work led him to a study of complex variables analogues of Hilbert’s 17th problem and to various combinatorial and algebraic properties of Rational Sphere Maps.

== Books ==
- Several Complex Variables and the Geometry of Real Hypersurfaces. CRC Press, 1992.
- Mathematical Thinking: Problem Solving and Proofs. Prentice-Hall, 2000. (joint with Douglas B. West)
- Inequalities from Complex Analysis. Mathematics Assoc. of America, 2002.
- An Introduction to Complex Analysis and Geometry. American Math. Society, 2010.
- Hermitian Analysis: From Fourier series to Cauchy-Riemann Geometry. Springer, 2013.
- Linear and Complex Analysis for Applications. CRC Press, 2017.
- Rational Sphere Maps. Springer-Birkhauser, 2021.
