= Bo Berndtsson =

Swedish mathematician

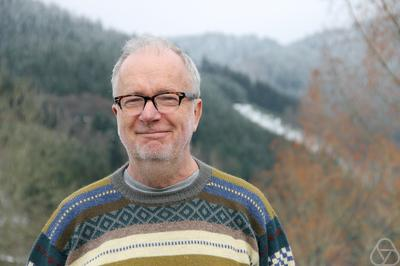
Berndtsson at Oberwolfach, 2015

Bo Berndtsson (born 24 December 1950), is a Swedish mathematician. His main contributions concern the theory of several complex variables and complex geometry. He gained in 1971 a BA degree from the University of Gothenburg in Sweden and obtained his PhD in 1977 under the direction of Tord Ganelius. Since 1996 he has been a professor at Chalmers University of Technology in Gothenburg. He has also been a guest professor at UCLA in Los Angeles, Université de Paris, Université Paul Sabatier in Toulouse, UAB in Barcelona and IPN in Mexico City. Berndtsson has been a member of the Royal Swedish Academy of Sciences since 2003. In 1995, he was awarded the Göran Gustafsson Prize and, in 2017, he received the Stefan Bergman Prize.

== Mathematical work ==
Berndtsson's first results concern zero sets of holomorphic functions, and in 1981 he showed that any divisor with finite area in the unit ball in the two-dimensional complex space is defined by a bounded holomorphic function (which is not true in higher dimensions). In the 1980s he also developed (together with Mats Andersson) a formalism to generate weighted integral representation formulas for holomorphic functions and solutions to the so-called $\bar\partial$-equation, which is the higher-dimensional generalization of the Cauchy–Riemann equations in the plane. This formalism led to new results concerning division and interpolation of holomorphic functions. In the 1990s Berndtsson started to work with $L^2$ methods that had been introduced by Lars Hörmander, Joseph J. Kohn and others in the 1960s and he modified these methods to obtain uniform estimates for the $\bar\partial$-equation. At this time he also achieved results about interpolation and sampling in Hilbert spaces of holomorphic functions using $L^2$-estimates.

More recently Berndtsson has worked on global problems on complex manifolds. In a series of papers starting in 2005 he has obtained positivity results for the curvature of holomorphic vector bundles naturally associated to holomorphic fibrations. These vector bundles arise as the zeroth direct images of the adjoint of an ample line bundle over the fibration. The case of a trivial line bundle was considered in earlier work by Phillip Griffiths in connection to variations of Hodge structures and by Fujita, Kawamata and Eckart Viehweg in algebraic geometry. Berndtsson has also explored applications of these positivity results in Kähler geometry (e.g., to geodesics in the space of Kähler metrics) and algebraic geometry (e.g., a new proof of the Kawamata subadjunction formula in a collaboration with Mihai Păun).

== Further activities ==
Bo Berndtsson was a singer in the Swedish prog rock group Love Explosion that was founded in the late sixties.
