= Dinh Tien-Cuong =

Vietnamese-French mathematician

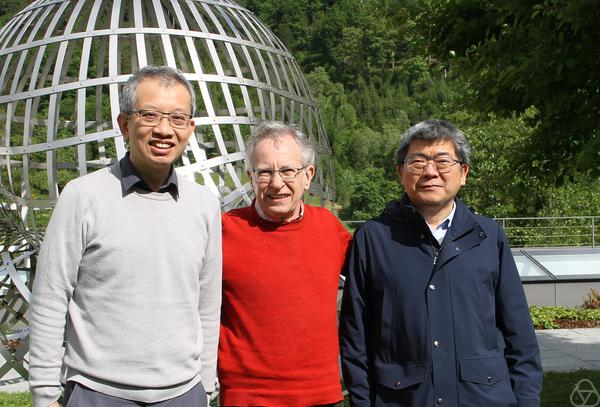
Tien-Cuong (left) at Oberwolfach in 2026 with George Marinescu and Xiaonan Ma

Dinh Tien-Cuong (Vietnamese: Đinh Tiến Cường, born May 1973 in Hai Duong, Vietnam) is a Vietnamese mathematician educated by the French school of mathematics, and Provost’s chair professor at National University of Singapore (NUS). He held professorship at Pierre and Marie Curie University (2005–2014), part-time professorship at Ecole Polytechnique de Paris (2005–2014) and at Ecole Normale Supérieure de Paris (2012–2014). He is known for his work on Several Complex Variables and Complex Dynamical Systems in Higher Dimension.

== Biography ==
Dinh Tien-Cuong studied computer science from 1990 to 1993 at Odessa University and mathematics from 1993 to 1997 at Pierre and Marie Curie University. He received in 1997 his PhD with thesis titled Enveloppe polynomiale d’un compact de longueur finie et problème du bord under the supervision of Gennadi Henkin. His research deals with complex analysis and complex dynamics in several variables, including collaborations with Nessim Sibony and Nguyen Viet-Anh on Fatou-Julia theory in several complex variables and on singular foliations by Riemann surfaces.

== Awards and honours ==
In 1989 he won a gold medal with full score 42/42 at the 30th International Mathematical Olympiad. He was a junior member of Institut Universitaire de France from 2007 to 2012. In 2018 he was an Invited Speaker and gave a talk Pluripotential Theory and Complex Dynamics in Higher Dimension at the 2018 International Congress of Mathematicians (ICM) in Rio. Also in 2018, he received the Humboldt Prize from Alexander von Humboldt foundation. He was named as a Fellow of the American Mathematical Society, in its 2027 class of fellows.

== Selected publications ==
- Dinh, Tien-Cuong; Sibony, Nessim (30 March 2018). "Density of positive closed currents, a theory of non-generic intersections". Journal of Algebraic Geometry. 27 (3). American Mathematical Society (AMS): 497–551. arXiv:1203.5810. doi:10.1090/jag/711. ISSN 1056-3911. S2CID 119321985.
- Dinh, Tien-Cuong; Sibony, Nessim (5 July 2017). "Unique ergodicity for foliations in $$\mathbb {P}^2$$ P 2 with an invariant curve". Inventiones Mathematicae. 211 (1). Springer Science and Business Media LLC: 1–38. arXiv:1509.07711. doi:10.1007/s00222-017-0744-2. ISSN 0020-9910. S2CID 253743372.
- Abate, Marco; Gentili, Graziano; Guenot, Jacques; Patrizio, Giorgio (2010). Holomorphic dynamical systems : lectures given at C.I.M.E. Summer School held in Cetraro, Italy, July 7-12, 2008. Heidelberg: Springer-Verlag. ISBN 978-3-642-13171-4. OCLC 663096152.
- Dinh, Tien-Cuong; Sibony, Nessim (2009). "Super-potentials of positive closed currents, intersection theory and dynamics". Acta Mathematica. 203 (1). International Press of Boston: 1–82. arXiv:math/0703702. doi:10.1007/s11511-009-0038-7. ISSN 0001-5962. S2CID 2240158.
- Dinh, Tien-Cuong; Sibony, Nessim (2006). "Distribution des valeurs de transformations méromorphes et applications". Commentarii Mathematici Helvetici. European Mathematical Society - EMS - Publishing House GmbH: 221–258. doi:10.4171/cmh/50. ISSN 0010-2571.
- Dinh, Tien-Cuong (2005). "Decay of correlations for Hénon maps". Acta Mathematica. 195 (2). International Press of Boston: 253–264. arXiv:math/0409356. doi:10.1007/bf02588081. ISSN 0001-5962. S2CID 17166487.
- Dinh, Tien-Cuong; Sibony, Nessim (1 May 2005). "Une borne supérieure pour l'entropie topologique d'une application rationnelle". Annals of Mathematics. 161 (3): 1637–1644. arXiv:math/0303271. doi:10.4007/annals.2005.161.1637. ISSN 0003-486X. S2CID 1101455.
- Dinh, Tien-Cuong; Sibony, Nessim (2003). "Dynamique des applications d'allure polynomiale". Journal de Mathématiques Pures et Appliquées (in French). 82 (4). Elsevier BV: 367–423. arXiv:math/0211271. doi:10.1016/s0021-7824(03)00026-6. ISSN 0021-7824. S2CID 15695154.
