= John M. Lee =

American mathematician

John Marshall Lee
- Born: September 2, 1950 (age 75)
- Education: Princeton University; Massachusetts Institute of Technology
- Scientific career
- Workplaces: University of Washington
- Thesis: Higher asymptotics of the complex Monge-Ampère equation and geometry of CR manifolds (1982)
- Doctoral advisor: Richard Burt Melrose

John "Jack" Marshall Lee (born September 2, 1950) is an American mathematician and professor at the University of Washington specializing in differential geometry.

== Education ==
Lee graduated from Princeton University with a bachelor's degree in 1972, then became a systems programmer (at Texas Instruments from 1972 to 1974 and at the Geophysical Fluid Dynamics Laboratory in 1974–1975) and a teacher at Wooster School in Danbury, Connecticut in 1975–1977. He continued his studies at Tufts University in 1977–1978. He received his doctorate from Massachusetts Institute of Technology in 1982 under the direction of Richard Melrose with the dissertation Higher asymptotics of the complex Monge-Ampère equation and geometry of CR manifolds.

== Career ==
From 1982 to 1987, Lee was an assistant professor at Harvard University. At the University of Washington he became in 1987 an assistant professor, in 1989 an associate professor, and in 1996 a full professor.

== Research ==
Lee's research has focused on the Yamabe problem, geometry of and analysis on CR manifolds, and differential geometry questions of general relativity (such as the constraint equations in the initial value problem of Einstein equations and existence of Einstein metrics on manifolds).

Lee created a mathematical software package named Ricci for performing tensor calculations in differential geometry. Ricci, named in honor of Gregorio Ricci-Curbastro and completed in 1992, consists of 7000 lines of Mathematica code. It was chosen for inclusion in the MathSource library of Mathematica packages supported by Wolfram Research.

== Awards ==
In 2012, Lee received, jointly with David Jerison, the Stefan Bergman Prize from the American Mathematical Society.

== Selected publications ==
- Lee, John M. (1986), "The Fefferman metric and pseudo-Hermitian invariants", Transactions of the American Mathematical Society, 296 (1): 411–429, doi:10.1090/S0002-9947-1986-0837820-2
- Jerison, David; Lee, John M. (1987), "The Yamabe problem on CR manifolds", Journal of Differential Geometry, 25 (2): 167–197, doi:10.4310/jdg/1214440849
- Lee, John M.; Parker, Thomas H. (1987), "The Yamabe problem", Bulletin of the American Mathematical Society, New Series, 17 (1): 37–91, doi:10.1090/S0273-0979-1987-15514-5
- Jerison, David; Lee, John M. (1988), "Extremals for the Sobolev inequality on the Heisenberg group and the CR Yamabe problem", Journal of the American Mathematical Society, 1 (1): 1–13, doi:10.1090/S0894-0347-1988-0924699-9
- Lee, John M. (1988), "Pseudo-Einstein structures on CR manifolds", American Journal of Mathematics, 110 (1): 157–178, doi:10.2307/2374543, JSTOR 2374543
- Jerison, David; Lee, John M. (1989), "Intrinsic CR normal coordinates and the CR Yamabe problem", Journal of Differential Geometry, 29 (2): 303–343, doi:10.4310/jdg/1214442877
- Lee, John M.; Uhlmann, Gunther (1989), "Determining anisotropic real-analytic conductivities by boundary measurements", Communications on Pure and Applied Mathematics, 42 (8): 1097–1112, doi:10.1002/cpa.3160420804
- Graham, C. Robin; Lee, John M. (1991), "Einstein metrics with prescribed conformal infinity on the ball", Advances in Mathematics, 87 (2): 186–225, doi:10.1016/0001-8708(91)90071-E

=== Textbooks ===
- Lee, John M. (1997). Riemannian Manifolds: An Introduction to Curvature. Graduate Texts in Mathematics. Vol. 176. New York: Springer-Verlag. ISBN 978-0-387-98322-6. OCLC 54850593.
- Riemannian Manifolds: An Introduction to Curvature, Springer-Verlag, Graduate Texts in Mathematics 1997
- Lee, John M. (2018). Introduction to Riemannian Manifolds. Graduate Texts in Mathematics. Vol. 176 (2nd ed.). doi:10.1007/978-3-319-91755-9. ISBN 978-3-319-91755-9. (formally, the second edition of the above text)
- Introduction to Topological Manifolds, Springer-Verlag, Graduate Texts in Mathematics 2000, 2nd edition 2011
- Lee, John M. (2012). Introduction to Smooth Manifolds. Graduate Texts in Mathematics. Vol. 218 (Second ed.). New York London: Springer-Verlag. ISBN 978-1-4419-9981-8. OCLC 808682771.
- Introduction to Smooth Manifolds, Springer-Verlag, Graduate Texts in Mathematics, 2002, 2nd edition 2012
- Fredholm Operators and Einstein Metrics on Conformally Compact Manifolds. American Mathematical Soc. 2006 doi:10.1090/memo/0864
- Lee, John M. (2024). Introduction to Complex Manifolds. Graduate Studies in Mathematics. Vol. 244. ISBN 9781470476953.
- Axiomatic Geometry, AMS 2013
