= Gerald Folland =

American mathematician

Gerald B. Folland
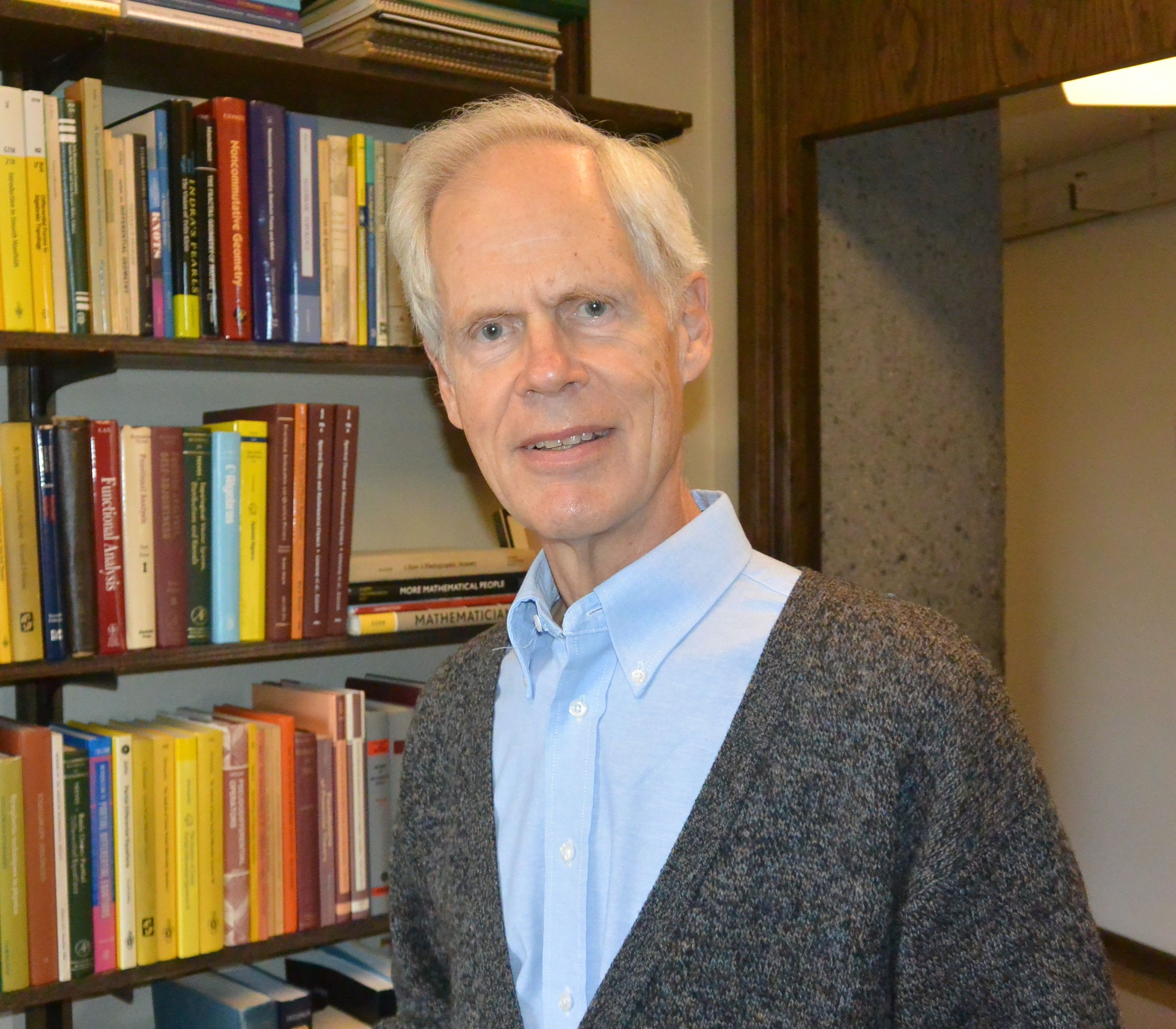
- Gerald Folland
- Born: June 4, 1947 (age 79); Salt Lake City, Utah, US
- Education: Princeton University
- Scientific career
- Fields: Mathematics
- Workplaces: University of Washington
- Thesis: The Tangential Cauchy-Riemann Complex on Spheres (1971)
- Doctoral advisor: Joseph Kohn

Gerald Budge Folland is an American mathematician and a professor of mathematics at the University of Washington. He is the author of several textbooks on mathematical analysis. His areas of interest include harmonic analysis (on both Euclidean space and Lie groups), differential equations, and mathematical physics.

In 2012 he became a fellow of the American Mathematical Society.

== Publications and books ==
- A Guide to Advanced Real Analysis, Washington, D.C. : Mathematical Association of America, 2009.
- Quantum Field Theory : A Tourist Guide for Mathematicians, Providence, R.I. : American Mathematical Society, 2008.
- Advanced Calculus, Prentice-Hall, 2002.
- Real Analysis: Modern Techniques and their Applications (2nd ed.), John Wiley, 1999, ISBN 978-0-471-31716-6.
- "The uncertainty principle: a mathematical survey", J. Fourier Anal. Appl. 4 (1997), 207–238 (with A. Sitaram).
- Introduction to Partial Differential Equations (2nd ed.), Princeton University Press, 1995.
- A Course in Abstract Harmonic Analysis, CRC Press, 1995.
- Fourier Analysis and Its Applications, Pacific Grove, Calif. : Wadsworth & Brooks/Cole Advanced Books & Software, 1992.
- Harmonic Analysis in Phase Space, Princeton University Press, 1989.
- Lectures on Partial Differential Equations : lectures delivered at the Indian Institute of Science, Bangalore, Springer, 1983.
- Hardy Spaces on Homogeneous Groups (with Elias M. Stein), Princeton University Press, 1982.
- "Estimates for the ∂b complex and analysis on the Heisenberg group", Comm. Pure Appl. Math. 27 (1974), 429–522 (with E. M. Stein)
