= Susan Loepp =

American mathematician

Susan Renee Loepp (born 1967) is an American mathematician who works as a professor of mathematics at Williams College. Her research concerns commutative algebra.

== Professional career ==
Loepp graduated from Bethel College (Kansas) in 1989, and earned her Ph.D. in 1994 from the University of Texas at Austin, under the supervision of Raymond Heitmann. After postdoctoral studies at the University of Nebraska–Lincoln she took her present faculty position at Williams. She has publications in Journal of Algebra and Journal of Pure and Applied Algebra.

== Book ==
With William Wootters, she is the co-author of the book Protecting Information: From Classical Error Correction to Quantum Cryptography (Cambridge University Press, 2006). The book covers topics in quantum cryptography and quantum computing and the potential impacts of quantum physics. These potential impacts include quantum computers which, if built, could crack our currently used public-key cryptosystems, and quantum cryptography which promises to provide an alternative to these cryptosystems.

== Awards and honors ==
In 2007, Loepp won the Young Alumnus Award from Bethel College. In 2010, she won the Northeastern Section of the Mathematical Association of America’s Teaching Award. In 2012, she won a Deborah and Franklin Tepper Haimo Award for Distinguished College or University Teaching of Mathematics from the Mathematical Association of America, which honors “college or university teachers who have been widely recognized as extraordinarily successful and whose teaching effectiveness has been shown to have had influence beyond their own institutions.” In 2013, she was elected as one of the inaugural fellows of the American Mathematical Society.

Loepp was an American Mathematical Society (AMS) Council member at large from 2019-2021.
