= Nessim Sibony =

French mathematician

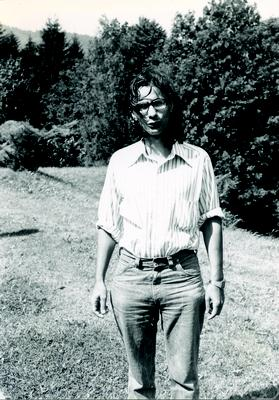
- Nessim Sibony at Mathematisches Forschungsinstitut Oberwolfach 1975
- Born: October 20, 1947
- Died: October 30, 2021 (aged 74)
- Education: University of Paris-Sud
- Known for: Theory of several complex variables, Complex dynamics
- Awards: Vaillant Prize (1985), Sophie Germain Prize (2009), Stefan Bergman Prize (2017)
- Scientific career
- Fields: Mathematics
- Workplaces: University of Paris-Sud

Nessim Sibony (20 October 1947 – 30 October 2021) was a French mathematician, specializing in the theory of several complex variables and complex dynamics in higher dimension. Since 1981, he was professor at the University of Paris-Sud in Orsay.

== Biography ==
Sibony received in 1974 his PhD from the University of Paris-Sud with thesis Problèmes de prolongement analytique et d'approximation polynômiale pondérée. His research deals with complex analysis and complex dynamics in several variables, including collaboration with John Erik Fornæss and Dinh Tien-Cuong on Fatou-Julia theory in several complex variables and on singular foliations by Riemann surfaces.

Independently of Adrien Douady and John H. Hubbard, Sibony proved in the 1980s that the Mandelbrot set is connected.

In 1985 he received the Vaillant Prize and in 2009 the Sophie Germain Prize from the French Academy of Sciences. For 2017 he received the Stefan Bergman Prize. In 1990 he was an Invited Speaker with talk Some recent results on weakly pseudoconvex domains at the ICM in Kyōto. He was a senior member of the Institut Universitaire de France from 2009 to 2014.

== Selected publications ==
- Dinh, Tien-Cuong; Sibony, Nessim (2018-07-01). "Density of positive closed currents, a theory of non-generic intersections". Journal of Algebraic Geometry. 27 (3): 497–551. arXiv:1203.5810. doi:10.1090/jag/711. ISSN 1056-3911.
- Dinh, Tien-Cuong; Sibony, Nessim (2010-07-01). "Super-potentials for currents on compact Kähler manifolds and dynamics of automorphisms". Journal of Algebraic Geometry. 19 (3): 473–529. doi:10.1090/S1056-3911-10-00549-7. ISSN 1056-3911.
- with Dierk Schleicher, Eric Bedford, Tien-Cuong Dinh, Marco Brunella, Marco Abate Holomorphic dynamical systems, Lectures at CIME (Cetraro 2008, in Sibony, Dinh Dynamics in several complex variables: Endomorphisms of projective spaces and polynomial like mappings), Springer Verlag, Lecturenotes in Mathematics, vol. 1998, 2010.
- with Tien-Cuong Dinh Super-potentials of positive closed currents, intersection theory and dynamics. Acta Math. 203 (2009), no. 1, 1–82.
- with Tien-Cuong Dinh Distribution des valeurs de transformations méromorphes et applications. (French) [Distribution of the values of meromorphic transformations and applications] Comment. Math. Helv. 81 (2006), no. 1, 221–258.
- with Tien-Cuong Dinh Dynamique des applications d'allure polynomiale. (French) [Dynamics of polynomial-like mappings] J. Math. Pures Appl. (9) 82 (2003), no. 4, 367–423.
- with Dominique Cerveau, Étienne Ghys, Jean-Christophe Yoccoz Complex Dynamics and Geometry, SMF/AMS Texts and Monographs vol. 10, 2003 (in von Sibony: Dynamics of rational maps on $P^k$), French edition SMF 1999 (Panoramas et Synthèses, vol. 8).
- with Julien Duval Polynomial convexity, rational convexity and currents, Duke Mathematical Journal, 79 (1995), no. 2, 487–513.
- Quelques problemes de prolongement de courants en analyse complexe, Duke Mathematical Journal, 52 (1985), pp. 157–197.
