= Paul C. Yang =

Taiwanese-American mathematician

- 杨建平
- Born: 1947 (age 78–79); Changhua, Taiwan
- Education: University of California, Berkeley (BA, PhD)
- Spouse: Sun-Yung Alice Chang
- Awards: Fellow of the American Mathematical Society
- Scientific career
- Fields: Mathematics
- Workplaces: Rice University; University of Maryland; Indiana University; University of Southern California; Princeton University
- Doctoral advisor: Hung-Hsi Wu

Paul C. Yang (Chinese: 杨建平; pinyin: Yáng Jiàn Píng; born 1947) is a Taiwanese-American mathematician specializing in differential geometry, partial differential equations and CR manifolds. He is best known for his work in Conformal geometry for his study of extremal metrics and his research on scalar curvature and Q-curvature. In CR Geometry he is known for his work on the CR embedding problem, the CR Paneitz operator and for introducing the Q' curvature in CR Geometry.

== Career ==
Yang received a B.A. in mathematics from the University of California, Berkeley, in 1969. He then earned his doctorate from Berkeley in 1973 under the supervision of Hung-Hsi Wu (Chinese: 伍鴻熙). He held positions at Rice University, the University of Maryland, Indiana University and the University of Southern California before joining Princeton University in 2001.

== Awards and honors ==
Yang was a Sloan Foundation Fellow in 1981. In 2012, he became a fellow of the American Mathematical Society.

== Selected publications ==
- Chang, Sun-Yung A.; Yang, Paul C. Conformal deformation of metrics on $S^2$. J. Differential Geom. 27 (1988), no. 2, 259–296.
- Chang, Sun-Yung A.; Yang, Paul C. Prescribing Gaussian curvature on $S^2$. Acta Math. 159 (1987), no. 3–4, 215–259.
- Chang, Sun-Yung A.; Yang, Paul C. Extremal metrics of zeta function determinants on 4-manifolds. Ann. of Math. (2) 142 (1995), no. 1, 171–212.
- Chang, Sun-Yung A.; Gursky, Matthew J.; Yang, Paul C. The scalar curvature equation on 2- and 3-spheres. Calc. Var. Partial Differential Equations 1 (1993), no. 2, 205–229.
- Chang, Sun-Yung A.; Gursky, Matthew J.; Yang, Paul C. An equation of Monge-Ampère type in conformal geometry, and four-manifolds of positive Ricci curvature. Ann. of Math. (2) 155 (2002), no. 3, 709–787.
- Yang, Paul C.; Yau, Shing-Tung Eigenvalues of the Laplacian of compact Riemann surfaces and minimal submanifolds. Ann. Scuola Norm. Sup. Pisa Cl. Sci. (4) 7 (1980), no. 1, 55–63.
- Chanillo, Sagun; Chiu, Hung-Lin; Yang, Paul C. Embeddability for Three Dimensional Cauchy-Riemann Manifolds and CR Yamabe Invariants, Duke Math. J.,161(15), (2012), 2909–2921.
