= Philip Gressman =

American mathematician

Philip T. Gressman
- Born: November 22, 1978 (age 47)
- Education: Washington University in St. Louis (AB, 2001); Princeton University (PhD, 2005)
- Scientific career
- Fields: Mathematics
- Workplaces: Yale University; University of Pennsylvania
- Thesis: Lp-Lq estimates for radon-like operators (2005)
- Doctoral advisor: Elias Stein

Philip Thaxton Gressman (born November 22, 1978) is an American mathematician and professor of mathematics at the University of Pennsylvania. His research is in harmonic analysis, geometry, and partial differential equations, including work on geometric averaging operators, oscillatory integral operators, Fourier restriction, and the Boltzmann equation. He was named a Fellow of the American Mathematical Society in the 2025 class.

== Early life and education ==
Gressman grew up in Ava, Missouri, and graduated from Ava High School in 1997. He received a Bachelor of Arts degree from Washington University in St. Louis in 2001, where he double majored in mathematics and physics, and was advised by Guido Weiss and Edward N. Wilson. He completed a PhD in mathematics at Princeton University in 2005 under the supervision of Elias Stein; his dissertation was titled Lp-Lq estimates for radon-like operators.

== Career and research ==
After completing his doctorate, Gressman was a J. W. Gibbs Assistant Professor at Yale University from 2005 to 2008. He joined the faculty of the University of Pennsylvania in 2008, where he serves as professor of mathematics and undergraduate chair.

Gressman's research investigates the intersection of harmonic analysis and geometry. His areas of interest include geometric averaging operators, oscillatory integral operators, sublevel set estimates, Fourier restriction, and other problems in analysis and partial differential equations.

He is known for his joint work with Robert M. Strain on the Boltzmann equation. Their work established existence, uniqueness, and rapid convergence to equilibrium for perturbative classical solutions of the Boltzmann equation with long-range interactions.

== Honors and awards ==
- Alfred P. Sloan Research Fellowship, 2011
- Fellow of the American Mathematical Society, 2025
