= Myers–Steenrod theorem =

The isometry group of a Riemannian manifold is a Lie group

Two theorems in the mathematical field of Riemannian geometry bear the name Myers–Steenrod theorem, both from a 1939 paper by Myers and Steenrod. The first states that every distance-preserving surjective map (that is, an isometry of metric spaces) between two connected Riemannian manifolds is a smooth isometry of Riemannian manifolds. A simpler proof was subsequently given by Richard Palais in 1957. The main difficulty lies in showing that a distance-preserving map, which is a priori only continuous, is actually differentiable.

The second theorem, which is harder to prove, states that the isometry group $\mathrm{Isom}(M)$ of a connected $\mathcal{C}^2$ Riemannian manifold $M$ is a Lie group in a way that is compatible with the compact-open topology and such that the action $\mathrm{Isom}(M)\times M \longrightarrow M$ is $\mathcal{C}^1$differentiable (in both variables). This is a generalization of the easier, similar statement when $M$ is a Riemannian symmetric space: for instance, the group of isometries of the two-dimensional unit sphere is the orthogonal group $O(3)$. A harder generalization is given by the Bochner-Montgomery theorem, where $\mathrm{Isom}(M)$ is replaced by a locally compact transformation group of diffeomorphisms of $M$.
