= Isometry =

Distance-preserving mathematical transformation

A composition of two opposite isometries is a direct isometry. A reflection in a line is an opposite isometry, like R_{1} (reflection w.r.t the center diagonal line) or R_{2} (reflection w.r.t the right diagonal line) on the image. Translation T is a direct isometry: a rigid motion.

In mathematics, an isometry (or congruence, or congruent transformation) is a distance-preserving transformation between metric spaces, usually assumed to be bijective. (Note: "We shall find it convenient to use the word transformation in the special sense of a one-to-one correspondence $P \to P'$ among all points in the plane (or in space), that is, a rule for associating pairs of points, with the understanding that each pair has a first member P and a second member P' and that every point occurs as the first member of just one pair and also as the second member of just one pair... In particular, an isometry (or "congruent transformation," or "congruence") is a transformation which preserves length ..." — Coxeter (1969) p. 29) The word isometry is derived from the Ancient Greek: ἴσος isos meaning "equal", and μέτρον metron meaning "measure". If the transformation is from a metric space to itself, it is a kind of geometric transformation known as a motion. The preservation of distances by an isometry commonly implies the preservation shapes, including angles (conformality), areas, and volumes.

== Introduction ==
Given a metric space (loosely, a set and a scheme for assigning distances between elements of the set), an isometry is a transformation which maps elements to the same or another metric space such that the distance between the image elements in the new metric space is equal to the distance between the elements in the original metric space. In a two-dimensional or three-dimensional Euclidean space, two geometric figures are congruent if they are related by an isometry; (Note: 3.11 Any two congruent triangles are related by a unique isometry.— Coxeter (1969) p. 39) the isometry that relates them is either a rigid motion (translation or rotation), or a composition of a rigid motion and a reflection.

Isometries are often used in constructions where one space is embedded in another space. For instance, the completion of a metric space $M$ involves an isometry from $M$ into $M',$ a quotient set of the space of Cauchy sequences on $M.$ The original space $M$ is thus isometrically isomorphic to a subspace of a complete metric space, and it is usually identified with this subspace. Other embedding constructions show that every metric space is isometrically isomorphic to a closed subset of some normed vector space and that every complete metric space is isometrically isomorphic to a closed subset of some Banach space.

An isometric surjective linear operator on a Hilbert space is called a unitary operator.

== Definition ==
Let $X$ and $Y$ be metric spaces with metrics (e.g., distances) $d_X$ and $d_Y.$ A map $f\colon X \to Y$ is called an isometry or distance-preserving map if for any $a, b \in X$,

$d_X(a,b)=d_Y\!\left(f(a),f(b)\right).$ (Note: Let T be a transformation (possibly many-valued) of $E^n$ ($2\leq n < \infty$) into itself. Let $d(p,q)$ be the distance between points p and q of $E^n$, and let Tp, Tq be any images of p and q, respectively. If there is a length a > 0 such that $d(Tp,Tq)=a$ whenever $d(p,q)=a$, then T is a Euclidean transformation of $E^n$ onto itself.)

An isometry is automatically injective; otherwise two distinct points, a and b, could be mapped to the same point, thereby contradicting the coincidence axiom of the metric d, i.e., $d(a,b) = 0$ if and only if $a=b$. This proof is similar to the proof that an order embedding between partially ordered sets is injective. Clearly, every isometry between metric spaces is a topological embedding.

A global isometry, isometric isomorphism or congruence mapping is a bijective isometry. Like any other bijection, a global isometry has a function inverse. The inverse of a global isometry is also a global isometry.

Two metric spaces X and Y are called isometric if there is a bijective isometry from X to Y. The set of bijective isometries from a metric space to itself forms a group with respect to function composition, called the isometry group.

There is also the weaker notion of path isometry or arcwise isometry:

A path isometry or arcwise isometry is a map which preserves the lengths of curves; such a map is not necessarily an isometry in the distance preserving sense, and it need not necessarily be bijective, or even injective. This term is often abridged to simply isometry, so one should take care to determine from context which type is intended.

Examples

- Any reflection, translation and rotation is a global isometry on Euclidean spaces. See also Euclidean group and Euclidean space § Isometries.
- The map $x \mapsto |x|$ in $\mathbb R$ is a path isometry but not a (general) isometry. Note that unlike an isometry, this path isometry does not need to be injective.

== Isometries between normed spaces ==
The following theorem is due to Mazur and Ulam.

Definition: The midpoint of two elements x and y in a vector space is the vector 1/2(x + y).

Theorem—Let A : X → Y be a surjective isometry between normed spaces that maps 0 to 0 (Stefan Banach called such maps rotations) where note that A is not assumed to be a linear isometry. Then A maps midpoints to midpoints and is linear as a map over the real numbers $\mathbb{R}$. If X and Y are complex vector spaces then A may fail to be linear as a map over $\mathbb{C}$.

=== Linear isometry ===
Given two normed vector spaces $V$ and $W ,$ a linear isometry is a linear map $A : V \to W$ that preserves the norms:

$$\|Av\|_W = \|v\|_V$$

for all $v \in V.$ Linear isometries are distance-preserving maps in the above sense. They are global isometries if and only if they are surjective.

In an inner product space, the above definition reduces to

$$\langle v, v \rangle_V = \langle Av, Av \rangle_W$$

for all $v \in V,$ which is equivalent to saying that $A^\dagger A = \operatorname{Id}_V.$ This also implies that isometries preserve inner products, as

$$\langle A u, A v \rangle_W = \langle u, A^\dagger A v \rangle_V = \langle u, v \rangle_V$$.

Linear isometries are not always unitary operators, though, as those require additionally that $V = W$ and $A A^\dagger = \operatorname{Id}_V$ (i.e. the domain and codomain coincide and $A$ defines a coisometry).

By the Mazur–Ulam theorem, any isometry of normed vector spaces over $\mathbb{R}$ is affine.

A linear isometry also necessarily preserves angles, therefore a linear isometry transformation is a conformal linear transformation.

Examples

- A linear map from $\mathbb{C}^n$ to itself is an isometry (for the dot product) if and only if its matrix is unitary.

== Manifold ==
An isometry of a manifold is any (smooth) mapping of that manifold into itself, or into another manifold that preserves the notion of distance between points. The definition of an isometry requires the notion of a metric on the manifold; a manifold with a (positive-definite) metric is a Riemannian manifold, one with an indefinite metric is a pseudo-Riemannian manifold. Thus, isometries are studied in Riemannian geometry.

A local isometry from one (pseudo-)Riemannian manifold to another is a map which pulls back the metric tensor on the second manifold to the metric tensor on the first. When such a map is also a diffeomorphism, such a map is called an isometry (or isometric isomorphism), and provides a notion of isomorphism ("sameness") in the category Rm of Riemannian manifolds.

=== Definition ===
Let $R = (M, g)$ and $R' = (M', g')$ be two (pseudo-)Riemannian manifolds, and let $f : R \to R'$ be a diffeomorphism. Then $f$ is called an isometry (or isometric isomorphism) if

$$g = f^{*} g',$$

where $f^{*} g'$ denotes the pullback of the rank (0, 2) metric tensor $g'$ by $f$. Equivalently, in terms of the pushforward $f_{*},$ we have that for any two vector fields $v, w$ on $M$ (i.e. sections of the tangent bundle $\mathrm{T} M$),

$$g(v, w) = g' \left( f_{*} v, f_{*} w \right).$$

If $f$ is a local diffeomorphism such that $g = f^{*} g',$ then $f$ is called a local isometry.

=== Properties ===
A collection of isometries typically form a group, the isometry group. When the group is a continuous group, the infinitesimal generators of the group are the Killing vector fields.

The Myers–Steenrod theorem states that every isometry between two connected Riemannian manifolds is smooth (differentiable). A second form of this theorem states that the isometry group of a Riemannian manifold is a Lie group.

Symmetric spaces are important examples of Riemannian manifolds that have isometries defined at every point.

== Generalizations ==
- Given a positive real number ε, an ε-isometry or almost isometry (also called a Hausdorff approximation) is a map $f \colon X \to Y$ between metric spaces such that
  1. for $x, x' \in X$ one has $|d_Y(f(x),f(x')) - d_X(x,x')| < \varepsilon,$ and
  2. for any point $y \in Y$ there exists a point $x \in X$ with $d_Y(y, f(x)) < \varepsilon$

That is, an ε-isometry preserves distances to within ε and leaves no element of the codomain further than ε away from the image of an element of the domain. Note that ε-isometries are not assumed to be continuous.

- The restricted isometry property characterizes nearly isometric matrices for sparse vectors.
- Quasi-isometry is yet another useful generalization.
- One may also define an element in an abstract unital C*-algebra to be an isometry:
  $a \in \mathfrak{A}$ is an isometry if and only if $a^* \cdot a = 1.$

Note that as mentioned in the introduction this is not necessarily a unitary element because one does not in general have that left inverse is a right inverse.

- On a pseudo-Euclidean space, the term isometry means a linear bijection preserving magnitude. See also Quadratic spaces.

== See also ==
- Angular velocity
- Beckman–Quarles theorem
- Conformal map – Mathematical function that preserves angles
- The second dual of a Banach space as an isometric isomorphism
- Euclidean plane isometry
- Flat (geometry)
- Homeomorphism group
- Involution
- Isometry group
- Motion (geometry)
- Myers–Steenrod theorem
- 3D isometries that leave the origin fixed
- Partial isometry
- Scaling (geometry)
- Semidefinite embedding
- Space group
- Symmetry in mathematics

== Bibliography ==
- Rudin, Walter (1991). Functional Analysis. International Series in Pure and Applied Mathematics. Vol. 8 (Second ed.). New York, NY: McGraw-Hill Science/Engineering/Math. ISBN 978-0-07-054236-5. OCLC 21163277.
- Narici, Lawrence; Beckenstein, Edward (2011). Topological Vector Spaces. Pure and applied mathematics (Second ed.). Boca Raton, FL: CRC Press. ISBN 978-1584888666. OCLC 144216834.
- Schaefer, Helmut H.; Wolff, Manfred P. (1999). Topological Vector Spaces. GTM. Vol. 8 (Second ed.). New York, NY: Springer New York Imprint Springer. ISBN 978-1-4612-7155-0. OCLC 840278135.
- Trèves, François (2006) [1967]. Topological Vector Spaces, Distributions and Kernels. Mineola, N.Y.: Dover Publications. ISBN 978-0-486-45352-1. OCLC 853623322.
- Wilansky, Albert (2013). Modern Methods in Topological Vector Spaces. Mineola, New York: Dover Publications, Inc. ISBN 978-0-486-49353-4. OCLC 849801114.
- Coxeter, H. S. M. (1969). Introduction to Geometry, Second edition. Wiley. ISBN 978-0-471-50458-0.
- Lee, Jeffrey M. (2009). Manifolds and Differential Geometry. Providence, RI: American Mathematical Society. ISBN 978-0-8218-4815-9.
