= Meyer Jerison =

American mathematician

- Born: November 8, 1922; Białystok, Poland
- Died: March 13, 1995 (aged 72)
- Education: University of Michigan; City College of New York
- Scientific career
- Fields: Functional analysis Rings
- Workplaces: Purdue University
- Doctoral advisor: Sumner Myers
- Doctoral students: Joel Smoller

Meyer Jerison (November 28, 1922 – March 13, 1995) was an American mathematician who worked in functional analysis and ring theory, known for coauthoring the textbook Rings of Continuous Functions along with Leonard Gillman.

Jerison immigrated in 1929 from Poland to New York City, and was naturalized in 1933. He earned a bachelor's degree in 1943 from the City College of New York and a master's degree in applied math in 1947 from Brown University. In 1945, he married the former Miriam Schwartz. He earned a Ph.D. in mathematics in 1950 from the University of Michigan under Sumner Myers with a dissertation entitled "The Space of Bounded Maps Into a Banach Space."

Jerison worked briefly at NACA in Cleveland and at Lockheed Corporation. He joined the mathematics faculty at Purdue University in 1951, where he spent the remainder of his career, retiring in 1991.

Jerison is the father of David Jerison, a mathematics professor at MIT, and Michael Jerison, a professor of economics at SUNY Albany. His grandson Daniel Jerison is a professor of mathematics at the University of San Francisco, and his granddaughter Elizabeth Jerison is a professor of biophysics at the University of Chicago.
