= Sundaram Thangavelu =

Indian mathematician (born 1957)

S. Thangavelu
- Born: 1957 (age 68–69); India
- Education: Madras University, Princeton University
- Awards: Shanti Swarup Bhatnagar Prize for Science and Technology
- Scientific career
- Fields: Harmonic analysis
- Workplaces: Indian Statistical Institute, Indian Institute of Science
- Doctoral advisor: Elias M. Stein

S. Thangavelu (Sundaram Thangavelu) (born 1957) is an Indian mathematician who specialised in harmonic analysis. He is a professor in the Department of Mathematics of Indian Institute of Science, Bangalore.

After obtaining an MSc degree from Madras University in 1980, Thangavelu moved to Princeton University and obtained the PhD degree in 1987 from there under the supervision of Elias Stein. He returned to India and worked at Tata Institute of Fundamental Research until 1993 when he moved to Indian Statistical Institute, Bangalore. In 2005, he shifted to Indian Institute of Science and continues there as Professor in the Department of Mathematics.

He was awarded the Shanti Swarup Bhatnagar Prize for Science and Technology in 2002, the highest science award in India, in the mathematical sciences category. Thangavelu has made significant contributions to the field of harmonic analysis on Euclidean spaces, Heisenberg groups and symmetric spaces, and also authored three monographs in these areas.

== Monographs ==
- Lectures on Hermite & Laguerre Expansions Mathematical Notes, 42. Princeton University Press, Princeton, New Jersey, 1993.
- Harmonic Analysis on the Heisenberg Group, Progress in Mathematics, 159. Birkhäuser Boston, Inc., Boston, Massachusetts, 1998.
- An Introduction to the Uncertainty Principle: Hardy's Theorem on Lie Groups, Progress in Mathematics, 217. Birkhäuser Boston, Inc., Boston, Massachusetts, 2004.

== Other awards/honours ==
- Fellow of the Indian Academy of Sciences, Bangalore
- B.M. Birla Science Prize in Mathematics for the year 1996
- Fellow of the Indian National Science Academy, New Delhi
