= Bach tensor =

Rank-2 tensor

In differential geometry and general relativity, the Bach tensor is a trace-free tensor of rank 2 which is conformally invariant in dimension n = 4. Before 1968, it was the only known conformally invariant tensor that is algebraically independent of the Weyl tensor. In abstract indices the Bach tensor is given by

$$B_{ab} = P_{cd}{{{W_a}^c}_b}^d+\nabla^c\nabla_cP_{ab}-\nabla^c\nabla_aP_{bc}$$

where $W$ is the Weyl tensor, and $P$ the Schouten tensor given in terms of the Ricci tensor $R_{ab}$ and scalar curvature $R$ by

$$P_{ab}=\frac{1}{n-2}\left(R_{ab}-\frac{R}{2(n-1)}g_{ab}\right).$$

== See also ==
- Cotton tensor
- Obstruction tensor
