= GJMS operator =

In the mathematical field of differential geometry, the GJMS operators are a family of differential operators, that are defined on a Riemannian manifold. In an appropriate sense, they depend only on the conformal structure of the manifold. The GJMS operators generalize the Paneitz operator and the conformal Laplacian. The initials GJMS are for its discoverers Graham, Jenne, Mason & Sparling (1992).

Properly, the GJMS operator on a conformal manifold of dimension n is a conformally invariant operator between the line bundle of conformal densities of weight k − n/2 for k a positive integer

$$L_k : E[k-n/2] \to E[-k-n/2].$$

The operators have leading symbol given by a power of the Laplace–Beltrami operator, and have lower order correction terms that ensure conformal invariance.

The original construction of the GJMS operators used the ambient construction of Charles Fefferman and Robin Graham. A conformal density defines, in a natural way, a function on the null cone in the ambient space. The GJMS operator is defined by taking a density ƒ of the appropriate weight k − n/2 and extending it arbitrarily to a function F off the null cone so that it still retains the same homogeneity. The function Δ^{k}F, where Δ is the ambient Laplace–Beltrami operator, is then homogeneous of degree −k − n/2, and its restriction to the null cone does not depend on how the original function ƒ was extended to begin with, and so is independent of choices. The GJMS operator also represents the obstruction term to a formal asymptotic solution of the Cauchy problem for extending a weight k − n/2 function off the null cone in the ambient space to a harmonic function in the full ambient space.

The most important GJMS operators are the critical GJMS operators. In even dimension n, these are the operators L_{n/2} that take a true function on the manifold and produce a multiple of the volume form.
