= Sumner Byron Myers =

American mathematician

- Born: February 19, 1910; Boston, Massachusetts, U.S.
- Died: October 8, 1955 (aged 45); Ann Arbor, Michigan, U.S.
- Education: Harvard University
- Known for: Myers theorem Myers–Steenrod theorem
- Scientific career
- Fields: Mathematics, topology, differential geometry
- Workplaces: University of Michigan
- Doctoral advisor: H. C. Marston Morse
- Doctoral students: Meyer Jerison; Leonard J. Savage

Sumner Byron Myers (February 19, 1910 – October 8, 1955) was an American mathematician specializing in topology and differential geometry. He studied at Harvard University under H. C. Marston Morse, where he graduated with a Ph.D. in 1932. Myers then pursued postdoctoral studies at Princeton University (1934–1936) before becoming a professor for mathematics at the University of Michigan. He died unexpectedly from a heart attack during the 1955 Michigan–Army football game at Michigan Stadium.

== Sumner B. Myers Prize ==
The Sumner B. Myers Prize is an annual award, first presented in 1962 in his honor, that recognizes mathematics Ph.D. students whose doctoral theses are considered distinguished contributions to their fields of research. The prize is administered by the Department of Mathematics in the College of Literature, Science, and the Arts at the University of Michigan.

Notable recipients include June Huh (2014), Mary Wootters (2014), and Theodore J. Kaczynski (1967).
