= Sidney Martin Webster =

American mathematician

Sidney Martin Webster (born 12 November 1945 in Danville, Illinois) is an American mathematician, specializing in multidimensional complex analysis.

After military service, Webster attended the University of California, Berkeley as an undergraduate and then as a graduate student, receiving a PhD in 1975 under the supervision of Shiing-Shen Chern with thesis Real hypersurfaces in complex space. Webster was a faculty member at Princeton University from 1975 to 1980 and at the University of Minnesota from 1980 to 1989. In 1989 he became a full professor at the University of Chicago. He has held visiting positions at the University of Wuppertal, Rice University, and ETH Zurich.

Webster was a Sloan Fellow for the academic year 1979–1980. In 1994 in Zurich he was an invited speaker of the International Congress of Mathematicians. In 2001 he received, jointly with László Lempert, the Stefan Bergman Prize from the American Mathematical Society. In 2012 Webster was elected a Fellow of the American Mathematical Society.

In 1977 he proved a significant theorem on biholomorphic mappings between algebraic real hypersurfaces. Using his expertise on Chern-Moser invariants, he developed a theory that provides a complete set of invariants for nondegenerate real hypersurfaces under volume-preserving biholomorphic transformations. He used the edge-of-the-wedge theorem to prove an extension theorem that generalized a 1974 theorem of Charles Fefferman.

== Selected publications ==
- Webster, S. M. (1979). "The rigidity of C-R hypersurfaces in a sphere". Indiana University Mathematics Journal. 28 (3): 405–416. doi:10.1512/iumj.1979.28.28027. JSTOR 24892266.
- Webster, S. M. (1979). "Biholomorphic mappings and the Bergman kernel off the diagonal". Inventiones Mathematicae. 51 (2): 155–169. Bibcode:1979InMat..51..155W. doi:10.1007/BF01390226. S2CID 119485248.
- with Klas Diederich: Diederich, K.; Webster, S. M. (1980). "A reflection principle for degenerate real hypersurfaces". Duke Math. J. 47 (4): 835–843. doi:10.1215/S0012-7094-80-04749-3.
- with Jürgen K. Moser: Moser, Jürgen K.; Webster, Sidney M. (1983). "Normal forms for real surfaces in $\mathbb{C}$^{2} near complex tangents and hyperbolic surface transformations". Acta Mathematica. 150: 255–296. doi:10.1007/BF02392973.
