= Stein–Strömberg theorem =

In mathematics, the Stein–Strömberg theorem or Stein–Strömberg inequality is a result in measure theory concerning the Hardy–Littlewood maximal operator. The result is foundational in the study of the problem of differentiation of integrals. The result is named after the mathematicians Elias M. Stein and Jan-Olov Strömberg.

== Statement of the theorem ==
Let λ^{n} denote n-dimensional Lebesgue measure on n-dimensional Euclidean space R^{n} and let M denote the Hardy–Littlewood maximal operator: for a function f : R^{n} → R, Mf : R^{n} → R is defined by

$$Mf(x) = \sup_{r > 0} \frac1{\lambda^{n} \big( B_{r} (x) \big)} \int_{B_{r} (x)} | f(y) | \, \mathrm{d} \lambda^{n} (y),$$

where B_{r}(x) denotes the open ball of radius r with center x. Then, for each p > 1, there is a constant C_{p} > 0 such that, for all natural numbers n and functions f ∈ L^{p}(R^{n}; R),

$$\| Mf \|_{L^{p}} \leq C_{p} \| f \|_{L^{p}}.$$

In general, a maximal operator M is said to be of strong type (p, p) if

$$\| Mf \|_{L^{p}} \leq C_{p, n} \| f \|_{L^{p}}$$

for all f ∈ L^{p}(R^{n}; R). Thus, the Stein–Strömberg theorem is the statement that the Hardy–Littlewood maximal operator is of strong type (p, p) uniformly with respect to the dimension n.
