= Pengfei Guan =

Canadian mathematician

- Education: Zhejiang University; Princeton University
- Awards: Canada Research Chair (since 2004)
- Scientific career
- Workplaces: University of North Carolina at Chapel Hill; McMaster University; McGill University
- Thesis: Holder Regularity of Subelliptic Pseudo-Differential Operators (1989)
- Doctoral advisor: Joseph J. Kohn

Pengfei Guan FRSC is a Canadian mathematician and Canada Research Chair in Geometric Analysis. He is a professor of mathematics at McGill University and a Fellow of the Royal Society of Canada.

== Biography ==
Guan graduated from the Department of Mathematics of Zhejiang University in Hangzhou. From 1982 to 1984, Guan was a graduate student at the Institute of Mathematics of the Chinese Academy of Sciences in Beijing. From 1984 to 1985, Guan studied at the University of North Carolina at Chapel Hill. Guan later continued his studies at Princeton University. Guan obtained his MS in 1986 and his PhD in 1989, both in mathematics from Princeton University.

Guan was an assistant professor (from 1989 to 1993), associate professor (from 1993 to 1997), and professor (from 1997 to 2004), all at the Department of Mathematics at McMaster University. Since 2004, Guan has been a professor of mathematics at McGill University.

Guan was awarded the Alfred P. Sloan Fellowship from 1993 to 1995. Guan has held the Canada Research Chair since 2004. Guan was elected to the Fellow of Royal Society of Canada in 2008.
