= Ambient construction =

In conformal geometry, the ambient construction refers to a construction of Charles Fefferman and Robin Graham for which a conformal manifold of dimension n is realized (ambiently) as the boundary of a certain Poincaré manifold, or alternatively as the celestial sphere of a certain pseudo-Riemannian manifold.

The ambient construction is canonical in the sense that it is performed only using the conformal class of the metric: it is conformally invariant. However, the construction only works asymptotically, up to a certain order of approximation. There is, in general, an obstruction to continuing this extension past the critical order. The obstruction itself is of tensorial character, and is known as the (conformal) obstruction tensor. It is, along with the Weyl tensor, one of the two primitive invariants in conformal differential geometry.

Aside from the obstruction tensor, the ambient construction can be used to define a class of conformally invariant differential operators known as the GJMS operators.

A related construction is the tractor bundle.

== Overview ==
The model flat geometry for the ambient construction is the future null cone in Minkowski space, with the origin deleted. The celestial sphere at infinity is the conformal manifold M, and the null rays in the cone determine a line bundle over M. Moreover, the null cone carries a metric which degenerates in the direction of the generators of the cone.

The ambient construction in this flat model space then asks: if one is provided with such a line bundle, along with its degenerate metric, to what extent is it possible to extend the metric off the null cone in a canonical way, thus recovering the ambient Minkowski space? In formal terms, the degenerate metric supplies a Dirichlet boundary condition for the extension problem and, as it happens, the natural condition is for the extended metric to be Ricci flat (because of the normalization of the normal conformal connection.)

The ambient construction generalizes this to the case when M is conformally curved, first by constructing a natural null line bundle N with a degenerate metric, and then solving the associated Dirichlet problem on N × (-1,1).

== Details ==
This section provides an overview of the construction, first of the null line bundle, and then of its ambient extension.

=== The null line bundle ===
Suppose that M is a conformal manifold, and that [g] denotes the conformal metric defined on M. Let π : N → M denote the tautological subbundle of T^{*}M ⊗ T^{*}M defined by all representatives of the conformal metric. In terms of a fixed background metric g_{0}, N consists of all positive multiples ω^{2}g_{0} of the metric. There is a natural action of R^{+} on N, given by

$$\delta_\omega g = \omega^2 g$$

Moreover, the total space of N carries a tautological degenerate metric, for if p is a point of the fibre of π : N → M corresponding to the conformal representative g_{p}, then let

$$h_p(X_p,Y_p) = g_p(\pi_*X,\pi_*Y).$$

This metric degenerates along the vertical directions. Furthermore, it is homogeneous of degree 2 under the R^{+} action on N:

$$\delta^*_\omega h = \omega^2 h$$

Let X be the vertical vector field generating the scaling action. Then the following properties are immediate:

h(X,-) = 0
L_{X}h = 2h, where L_{X} is the Lie derivative along the vector field X.

=== The ambient space ===
Let N^{~} = N × (-1,1), with the natural inclusion i : N → N^{~}. The dilations δ_{ω} extend naturally to N^{~}, and hence so does the generator X of dilation.

An ambient metric on N^{~} is a Lorentzian metric h^{~} such that

- The metric is homogeneous: δ_{ω}^{*} h^{~} = ω^{2} h^{~}
- The metric is an ambient extension: i^{*} h^{~} = h, where i^{*} is the pullback along the natural inclusion.
- The metric is Ricci flat: Ric(h^{~}) = 0.

Suppose that a fixed representative of the conformal metric g and a local coordinate system x = (x^{i}) are chosen on M. These induce coordinates on N by identifying a point in the fibre of N with (x,t^{2}g(x)) where t > 0 is the fibre coordinate. (In these coordinates, X = t ∂_{t}.) Finally, if ρ is a defining function of N in N^{~} which is homogeneous of degree 0 under dilations, then (x,t,ρ) are coordinates of N^{~}. Furthermore, any extension metric which is homogeneous of degree 2 can be written in these coordinates in the form:

$$h^\sim = t^2 g_{ij}(x,\rho)dx^idx^j+2\rho dt^2+2tdtd\rho,\,$$

where the g_{ij} are n^{2} functions with g(x,0) = g(x), the given conformal representative.

After some calculation one shows that the Ricci flatness is equivalent to the following differential equation, where the prime is differentiation with respect to ρ:

$$\rho g_{ij}''-\rho g^{kl}g_{ik}'g_{jl}+\tfrac12\rho g^{kl}g_{kl}'g_{ij}'+\frac{2-n}{2}g_{ij}'-\tfrac12 g^{kl}g_{kl}'g_{ij}+\mathrm{Ric}(g)_{ij}=0.$$

One may then formally solve this equation as a power series in ρ to obtain the asymptotic development of the ambient metric off the null cone. For example, substituting ρ = 0 and solving gives

g_{ij}^{′}(x,0) = 2P_{ij}

where P is the Schouten tensor. Next, differentiating again and substituting the known value of g_{ij}^{′}(x,0) into the equation, the second derivative can be found to be a multiple of the Bach tensor. And so forth.

== See also ==
- AdS/CFT correspondence
- Holographic principle
