= Christopher D. Sogge =

American mathematician

Christopher Donald Sogge (/ˈsɒɡi/; born July 14, 1960) is an American mathematician. He is the J. J. Sylvester Professor of Mathematics at Johns Hopkins University and the editor-in-chief of the American Journal of Mathematics. His research concerns Fourier analysis and partial differential equations.

== Education and career ==
Sogge graduated from the University of Chicago in 1982, and earned a doctorate in mathematics from Princeton University in 1985 under the supervision of Elias M. Stein. He taught at the University of Chicago from 1985 to 1989 and the University of California, Los Angeles from 1989 to 1996 before moving to Johns Hopkins.

== Personal life ==
In 1987, he married Elizabeth Lombardi. They had three children, Lewis, Susanna and William Sogge.

== Awards and honors ==
In 2012, he became one of the inaugural fellows of the American Mathematical Society. He has fellowships from the National Science Foundation, Alfred P. Sloan Foundation, Guggenheim Foundation, and he received the Presidential Young Investigator Award. In 2007 he received the Diversity Recognition Award from Johns Hopkins University.

== Books ==
- Fourier integrals in classical analysis (Cambridge Tracts in Mathematics 105, Cambridge University Press, 1993)
- Lectures on non-linear wave equations (International Press, 1995; 2nd ed., 2008)
- Hangzhou lectures on eigenfunctions of the Laplacian, (Annals of Mathematics Studies 188, Princeton University Press, 2014)
