= Princeton Lectures in Analysis =

Series of four mathematics textbooks

- The covers of the four volumes of the Princeton Lectures in Analysis
- Fourier Analysis; Complex Analysis; Real Analysis; Functional Analysis
- Author: Elias M. Stein, Rami Shakarchi
- Country: United States
- Language: English
- Discipline: Mathematics
- Publisher: Princeton University Press
- Published: 2003, 2003, 2005, 2011
- No. of books: 4

The Princeton Lectures in Analysis is a series of four mathematics textbooks, each covering a different area of mathematical analysis. They were written by Elias M. Stein and Rami Shakarchi and published by Princeton University Press between 2003 and 2011. They are, in order, Fourier Analysis: An Introduction; Complex Analysis; Real Analysis: Measure Theory, Integration, and Hilbert Spaces; and Functional Analysis: Introduction to Further Topics in Analysis.

Stein and Shakarchi wrote the books based on a sequence of intensive undergraduate courses Stein began teaching in the spring of 2000 at Princeton University. At the time Stein was a mathematics professor at Princeton and Shakarchi was a graduate student in mathematics. Though Shakarchi graduated in 2002, the collaboration continued until the final volume was published in 2011. The series emphasizes the unity among the branches of analysis and the applicability of analysis to other areas of mathematics.

The Princeton Lectures in Analysis has been identified as a well written and influential series of textbooks, suitable for advanced undergraduates and beginning graduate students in mathematics.

== History ==
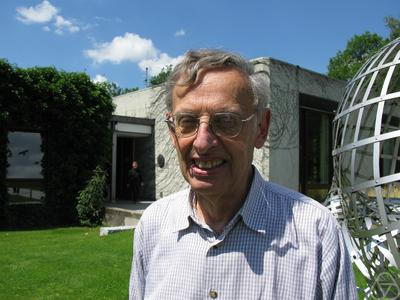
Elias M. Stein

The first author, Elias M. Stein, was a mathematician who made significant research contributions to the field of mathematical analysis. Before 2000 he had authored or co-authored several influential advanced textbooks on analysis.

Beginning in the spring of 2000, Stein taught a sequence of four intensive undergraduate courses in analysis at Princeton University, where he was a mathematics professor. At the same time he collaborated with Rami Shakarchi, then a graduate student in Princeton's math department studying under Charles Fefferman, to turn each of the courses into a textbook. Stein taught Fourier analysis in that first semester, and by the fall of 2000 the first manuscript was nearly finished. That fall Stein taught the course in complex analysis while he and Shakarchi worked on the corresponding manuscript. Paul Hagelstein, then a postdoctoral scholar in the Princeton math department, was a teaching assistant for this course. In spring 2001, when Stein moved on to the real analysis course, Hagelstein started the sequence anew, beginning with the Fourier analysis course. Hagelstein and his students used Stein and Shakarchi's drafts as texts, and they made suggestions to the authors as they prepared the manuscripts for publication. The project received financial support from Princeton University and from the National Science Foundation.

Shakarchi earned his Ph.D. from Princeton in 2002 and moved to London to work in finance. Nonetheless he continued working on the books, even as his employer, Lehman Brothers, collapsed in 2008. The first two volumes were published in 2003. The third followed in 2005, and the fourth in 2011. Princeton University Press published all four.

== Contents ==
The volumes are split into seven to ten chapters each. Each chapter begins with an epigraph providing context for the material and ends with a list of challenges for the reader, split into Exercises, which range in difficulty, and more difficult Problems. Throughout the authors emphasize the unity among the branches of analysis, often referencing one branch within another branch's book. They also provide applications of the theory to other fields of mathematics, particularly partial differential equations and number theory.

Fourier Analysis covers the discrete, continuous, and finite Fourier transforms and their properties, including inversion. It also presents applications to partial differential equations, Dirichlet's theorem on arithmetic progressions, and other topics. Because Lebesgue integration is not introduced until the third book, the authors use Riemann integration in this volume. They begin with Fourier analysis because of its central role within the historical development and contemporary practice of analysis.

Complex Analysis treats the standard topics of a course in complex variables as well as several applications to other areas of mathematics. The chapters cover the complex plane, Cauchy's integral theorem, meromorphic functions, connections to Fourier analysis, entire functions, the gamma function, the Riemann zeta function, conformal maps, elliptic functions, and theta functions.

Real Analysis begins with measure theory, Lebesgue integration, and differentiation in Euclidean space. It then covers Hilbert spaces before returning to measure and integration in the context of abstract measure spaces. It concludes with a chapter on Hausdorff measure and fractals.

Functional Analysis has chapters on several advanced topics in analysis: L^{p} spaces, distributions, the Baire category theorem, probability theory including Brownian motion, the theory of functions of several complex variables, and oscillatory integrals.

== Reception ==
The books "received rave reviews indicating they are all outstanding works written with remarkable clarity and care." Reviews praised the exposition, identified the books as accessible and informative for advanced undergraduates or graduate math students, and predicted they would grow in influence as they became standard references for graduate courses. William Ziemer wrote that the third book omitted material he expected to see in an introductory graduate text but nonetheless recommended it as a reference.

Peter Duren compared Stein and Shakarchi's attempt at a unified treatment favorably with Walter Rudin's textbook Real and Complex Analysis, which Duren calls too terse. On the other hand, Duren noted that this sometimes comes at the expense of topics that reside naturally within only one branch. He mentioned in particular geometric aspects of complex analysis covered in Lars Ahlfors's textbook but noted that Stein and Shakarchi also treat some topics Ahlfors skips.

== List of books ==
- Stein, Elias M.; Shakarchi, Rami (2003). Fourier Analysis: An Introduction. Princeton University Press. ISBN 069111384X.
- Stein, Elias M.; Shakarchi, Rami (2003). Complex Analysis. Princeton University Press. ISBN 0691113858.
- Stein, Elias M.; Shakarchi, Rami (2005). Real Analysis: Measure Theory, Integration, and Hilbert Spaces. Princeton University Press. ISBN 0691113866.
- Stein, Elias M.; Shakarchi, Rami (2011). Functional Analysis: Introduction to Further Topics in Analysis. Princeton University Press. ISBN 9780691113876.
