= László Lempert =

Hungarian American mathematician

- Born: Budapest, Hungary
- Education: Doctorate 1975, Eötvös Loránd University
- Known for: Several complex variables, Complex geometry
- Awards: Stefan Bergman Prize
- Scientific career
- Fields: Mathematics
- Workplaces: Purdue University; Eötvös Loránd University
- Doctoral advisor: Miklós Simonovits

László Lempert (4 June 1952, in Budapest) is a Hungarian-American mathematician, working in several complex variables and complex geometry. He proved that the Carathéodory and Kobayashi distances agree on convex domains. He further proved that a compact, strictly pseudoconvex real analytic hypersurface can be embedded into the unit sphere of a Hilbert space.

== Life ==
Lempert graduated from the Eötvös Loránd University in 1975. He was at the Analysis Department of the same university (1977–1988) and is a professor of Purdue University since 1988. He was a visiting research fellow at the Université de Paris VII (1979–1980), visiting lecturer at the Princeton University (1984–1985), and visiting professor at the Eötvös Loránd University (1994–1995).

== Degrees, awards ==
Lempert received the Candidate of the mathematical sciences degree from the Hungarian Academy of Sciences in 1984. He was an invited session speaker at the International Congress of Mathematicians, in Berkeley, California, 1986. He won the Stefan Bergman Prize in 2001. He was elected an external member of the Hungarian Academy of Sciences (2004). In 2012 he became a fellow of the American Mathematical Society.
