= American Journal of Mathematics =

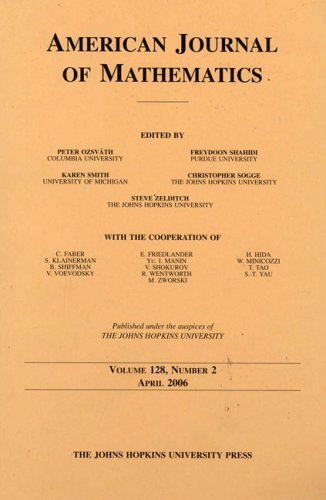
- Discipline: Mathematics
- Language: English
- Edited by: Christopher D. Sogge

Publication details
- History: 1878–present
- Publisher: Johns Hopkins University Press for the Johns Hopkins University Department of Mathematics (United States)
- Frequency: Bimonthly
- Impact factor: 1.337 (2009)

Standard abbreviations
- ISO 4: Am. J. Math.
- MathSciNet: Amer. J. Math.

Indexing
- CODEN: AJMAAN
- ISSN: 0002-9327 (print); 1080-6377 (web)
- JSTOR: 00029327
- OCLC no.: 1480153

Links
- Journal homepage; Online access at Project MUSE

The American Journal of Mathematics is a bimonthly mathematics journal published by the Johns Hopkins University Press.

== History ==
The American Journal of Mathematics is the oldest continuously published mathematical journal in the United States, established in 1878 at the Johns Hopkins University by James Joseph Sylvester, an English-born mathematician who also served as the journal's editor-in-chief from its inception through early 1884. Initially W. E. Story was associate editor in charge; he was replaced by Thomas Craig in 1880. For volume 7 Simon Newcomb became chief editor with Craig managing until 1894. Then with volume 16 it was "Edited by Thomas Craig with the Co-operation of Simon Newcomb" until 1898.

Other notable mathematicians who have served as editors or editorial associates of the journal include Frank Morley, Oscar Zariski, Lars Ahlfors, Hermann Weyl, Wei-Liang Chow, S. S. Chern, André Weil, Harish-Chandra, Jean Dieudonné, Henri Cartan, Stephen Smale, Jun-Ichi Igusa, and Joseph A. Shalika.

Fields medalist Cédric Villani has speculated that "the most famous article in its long history" may be a 1958 paper by John Nash, "Continuity of solutions of parabolic and elliptic equations".

== Scope and impact factor ==
The American Journal of Mathematics is a general-interest (i.e., non-specialized) mathematics journal covering all the major areas of contemporary mathematics. According to the Journal Citation Reports, its 2009 impact factor is 1.337, ranking it 22nd out of 255 journals in the category "Mathematics".

== Editors ==
As of June, 2012, the editors are Christopher D. Sogge, editor-in-chief (Johns Hopkins University), William Minicozzi II (Massachusetts Institute of Technology), Freydoon Shahidi (Purdue University), and Vyacheslav Shokurov (The Johns Hopkins University).
