= Joseph J. Kohn =

Czech-American mathematician (1932–2023)

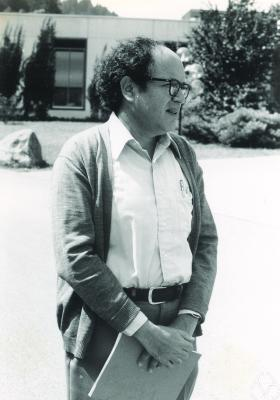
- Born: May 18, 1932; Prague, Czechoslovakia
- Died: September 13, 2023 (aged 91); Plainsboro, New Jersey, U.S.
- Education: Massachusetts Institute of Technology (BS); Princeton University (PhD)
- Known for: Kohn Laplacian; Kohn–Rossi complex
- Awards: Leroy P. Steele Prize (1979); ICM Speaker (1966); Stefan Bergman Prize (2004)
- Scientific career
- Workplaces: Princeton University
- Doctoral advisor: Donald Spencer
- Doctoral students: David Catlin; John P. D'Angelo; Gerald Folland; Pengfei Guan; Mei-Chi Shaw

Joseph John Kohn (May 18, 1932 – September 13, 2023) was a Czech-born American academic and mathematician. He was professor of mathematics at Princeton University, where he researched partial differential operators and complex analysis.

== Life and work ==
Kohn's father was Czech-Jewish architect Otto Kohn. After Nazi Germany invaded Czechoslovakia, he and his family emigrated to Paris and Ecuador in 1939. There, Otto attended Colegio Americano de Quito.

In 1945, Joseph moved to the United States, where he attended Brooklyn Technical High School. He studied at Massachusetts Institute of Technology (B.S. 1953) and at Princeton University, where he earned his Ph.D. in 1956 under Donald Spencer ("A Non-Self-Adjoint Boundary Value Problem on Pseudo-Kähler Manifolds").

From 1956 to 1957, Kohn was an instructor at Princeton. In 1958, he served as assistant professor, in 1962, associate professor and in 1964, professor at Brandeis University, where he also served as Chairman of the Mathematics Department (1963–66). Since 1968, he had been a professor at Princeton University, where he served as chairman from 1993 to 1996. He was a visiting professor at Harvard (1996–97), Prague, Florence, Mexico City (National Polytechnic Institute), Stanford, Berkeley, Scuola Normale Superiore (Pisa, Italy), and IHES (France).

Kohn's work focused, among other things, on the use of partial differential operators in the theory of functions of several complex variables and microlocal analysis. He has at least 65 doctoral descendants.

Kohn was a Sloan Fellow in 1963 and a Guggenheim Fellow in 1976–77. From 1976 to 1988, he was a member of the editorial board of the Annals of Mathematics. In 1966, he was an invited speaker at the International Congress of Mathematicians in Moscow; he gave a speech on "Differential complexes".

Film director Miloš Forman was his half-brother through their father Otto Kohn.

Kohn died in Plainsboro, New Jersey on September 13, 2023, at the age of 91.

== Awards and honors ==
Kohn was a member of the American Academy of Arts and Sciences from 1966 and a member of the National Academy of Sciences from 1988. In 2012, he became a fellow of the American Mathematical Society (AMS).

Kohn won the AMS' Steele Prize in 1979 for his paper "Harmonic integrals on strongly convex domains". In 1990, he received an Honorary Doctorate from the University of Bologna. In 2004, he was awarded the Bolzano Prize.

== Literature ==
- Bloom, Catlin, D´Angelo, Siu (Herausgeber) Modern methods in complex analysis. Papers from the conference honoring Robert Gunning and Joseph Kohn on the occasion of their 60th birthdays held at Princeton University 1992, Princeton University Press (PUP) 1995
