= William Wootters =

American physicist

William Kent Wootters
- Known for: Founding quantum information theory Quantum teleportation Coffman–Kundu–Wootters inequality Schrödinger–HJW theorem Concurrence; Entanglement distillation Entanglement of formation No-cloning theorem Problem of time U-bit; Coining word "qubit"
- Scientific career
- Fields: Theoretical physics

William "Bill" Kent Wootters is an American theoretical physicist, and one of the founders of the field of quantum information theory. In a 1982 joint paper with Wojciech H. Zurek, Wootters proved the no-cloning theorem, at the same time as Dennis Dieks, and independently of James L. Park who had formulated the no-cloning theorem in 1970. He is known for his contributions to the theory of quantum entanglement including quantitative measures of it, entanglement-assisted communication (notably quantum teleportation, discovered by Wootters and collaborators in 1993) and entanglement distillation. The term qubit, denoting the basic unit of quantum information, originated in a conversation between Wootters and Benjamin Schumacher in 1992.

He earned a B.S. from Stanford University in 1973, and his Ph.D. from the University of Texas at Austin in 1980. His thesis was titled The Acquisition of Information from Quantum Measurements, and Linda Reichl was his doctoral advisor, while John A. Wheeler also served as a mentor. He was a member of the physics department at Williams College from 1982 to 2017, receiving the title of Barclay Jermain Professor of Natural Philosophy. He was elected a fellow of the American Physical Society in 1999, for "contributions on the foundations of quantum mechanics and groundbreaking work in quantum information and communications theory."

With Susan Loepp, he is the co-author of the book Protecting Information: From Classical Error Correction to Quantum Cryptography (Cambridge University Press, 2006).

He is married to Adrienne Wootters, a professor of physics at the Massachusetts College of Liberal Arts. His daughter, Mary Wootters, is a professor of computer science at Stanford University.

== See also ==
- Monogamy of entanglement
- Problem of time
- Schrödinger–HJW theorem
- U-bit
