= David Catlin =

American mathematician

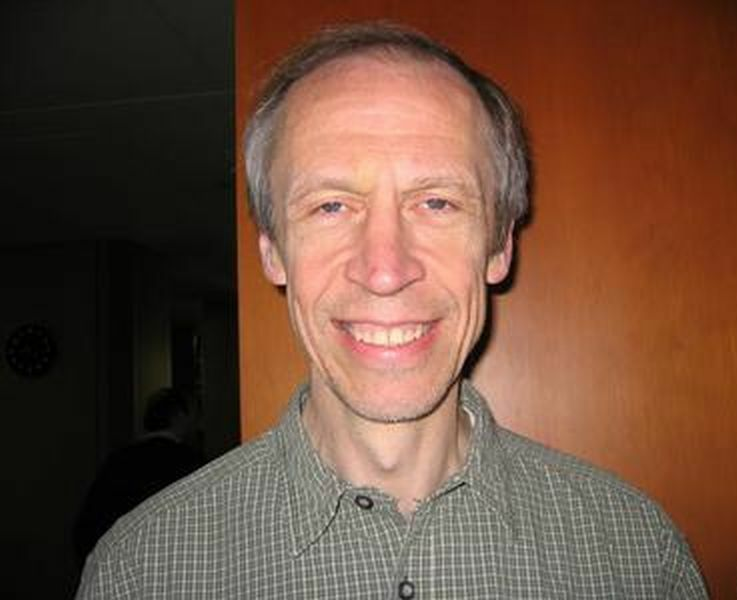
David Catlin, Oberwolfach 2004

David William Catlin (born 12 May 1952 Rochester, Pennsylvania) is an American mathematician who works on the theory of several complex variables.

Catlin received in 1978 his Ph.D. from Princeton University under Joseph Kohn with thesis Boundary Behavior of Holomorphic Functions on Weakly Pseudoconvex Domains. He is a professor at Purdue University.

He solved a boundary behavior problem of complex analysis in several variables, on which his teacher Kohn worked in detail and which was originally formulated by Donald Spencer, a particular case of the Neumann problem for $\overline{\partial}$, a non-elliptic boundary value problem.

Catlin was an Invited Speaker with talk Regularity of solutions of the $\overline{\partial}$-Neumann problem at the ICM in 1986 in Berkeley. In 1989 he received the inaugural Stefan Bergman Prize.

His brother Paul Allen Catlin (1948–1995) also achieved fame as a mathematician, doing research on graph theory.

== Selected publications ==
- Necessary conditions for subellipticity of the $\overline{\partial}$-Neumann problem, Annals of Mathematics, 117, 1983, 147–171 doi:10.2307/2006974
- Boundary invariants of pseudoconvex domains, Annals of Mathematics 120, 1984, 529–586 doi:10.2307/1971087
- Subelliptic estimates for the $\overline{\partial}$-Neumann problem on pseudoconvex domains, Annals of Mathematics, 126, 1987, 131–191 doi:10.2307/1971347
- Estimates of invariant metrics on pseudoconvex domains of dimension two, Mathematische Zeitschrift 200, 1989, 429–466 doi:10.1007/BF01215657
- as editor with Thomas Bloom, John P. D'Angelo, Yum-Tong Siu: Modern methods in complex analysis, Annals of Mathematics Studies 137, Princeton University Press 1995 (dedicated to Robert Gunning and Joseph Kohn)
- with J. P. D'Angelo: A stabilization theorem for Hermitian forms and applications to holomorphic mappings, arXiv preprint math/9511201, 1995
- Global regularity of the $\overline{\partial}$-Neumann problem, in: Complex analysis of several variables, Proc. Symp. Pure Math. Vol. 41, AMS, 1984, 39–49
- Necessary conditions for subellipticity and hypoellipticity for the $\overline{\partial}$-Neumann problem on pseudoconvex domains, in: Recent Developments in Several Complex Variables (John E. Fornæss, ed.), Annals of Mathematics Studies Vol. 100, 2016, 93–100.
