= David Jerison =

American mathematician

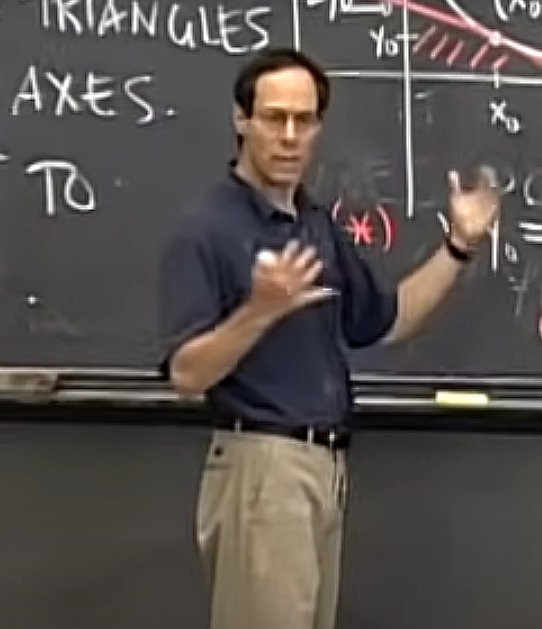
- David Jerison
- Born: David Saul Jerison; 14 November, 1953; Lafayette, Indiana, USA
- Education: Harvard University, (A.B.); Princeton University, (Ph.D.)
- Years active: 1981- present
- Parent: Meyer Jerison
- Awards: Alfred P. Sloan Research Fellowship; Presidential Young Investigator Award; Stefan Bergman Prize
- Scientific career
- Fields: Fourier analysis; Partial differential equations
- Doctoral advisor: Elias M. Stein

David Saul Jerison is an American mathematician specializing in partial differential equations and Fourier analysis. He is currently a professor of mathematics and a MacVicar Faculty Fellow at the Massachusetts Institute of Technology.

== Education and career ==
The son of mathematician Meyer Jerison and Miriam Schwartz, Jerison did his undergraduate studies at Harvard University and received a bachelor's degree in 1975. He then received his Ph.D. in 1980 from Princeton University advised by Elias M. Stein. After postdoctoral research at the University of Chicago, he joined MIT in 1981.

== Awards and honors ==
In 1985, he received an A.P. Sloan Foundation Fellowship and a Presidential Young Investigator Award. In 1994, Jerison was an invited speaker at the International Congress of Mathematicians in Zurich. In 1999, he was elected as a fellow of the American Academy of Arts and Sciences. He became a MacVicar Fellow in 2004. In 2012, he became a fellow of the American Mathematical Society. In 2012, he received, jointly with John M. Lee, the Stefan Bergman Prize from the American Mathematical Society.
