= Gennadi Henkin =

Russian mathematician and mathematical economist

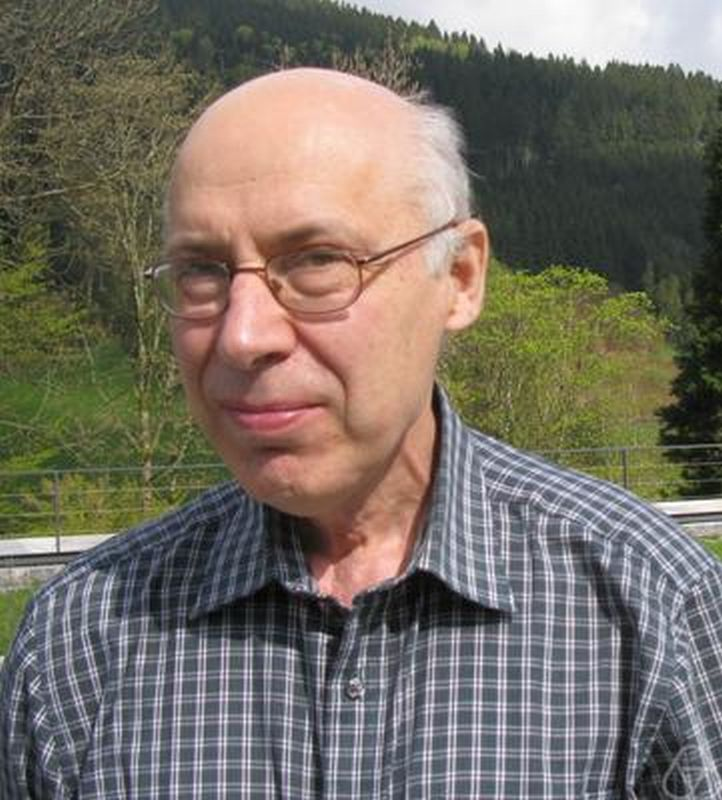
Gennadi Henkin

Gennadi Markovich Henkin (Геннадий Маркович Хенкин, born 26 October 1942, Moscow – 19 January 2016, Paris) was a Russian mathematician and mathematical economist.

Henkin studied at Moscow State University, where he received his doctorate in 1967 and habilitated in 1973 (Russian doctor title). From 1973 he was a senior scientist at the Central Economic Mathematical Institute (CEMI) of the Russian Academy of Sciences. From 1991 he was a professor at the Pierre et Marie Curie University (Paris VI).

He published on complex analysis (in particular integral representations in several complex variables), functional analysis, mathematical economics, evolution equations, integral geometry, and inverse problems (with applications in seismology and other sciences).

In 1983 he was an Invited Speaker with talk Tangent Cauchy-Riemann equations and the Yang-Mills, Higgs and Dirac fields at the International Congress of Mathematicians in Warsaw. In 1992 he shared, with Victor Polterovich, the Kondratiev Prize in mathematical economics from the Russian Academy of Sciences for works on Schumpeterian dynamics and nonlinear wave theory. In 2011 he received the Stefan Bergman Prize for "fundamental contributions to the theory of functions on complex manifolds, integral representations in several complex variables, and the multidimensional Cauchy-Riemann equations".

== Selected publications ==
- with Jürgen Leiterer: Andreotti-Grauert theory by integral formulas, Akademie Verlag 1988, Birkhäuser 1988
- The Abel-Radon transform and several complex variables, in: Annals of Mathematics Studies No. 137, Princeton University Press 1995, pp. 223–275
- with S. G. Gindikin: The Penrose transform and complex integral geometry, Itogi Nauki i Tekhniki. Ser. Sovrem. Probl. Mat., Vol. 17, 1981, pp. 57–111
- with R. A. Airapetyan: Integral representations of differential forms on Cauchy-Riemann manifolds and the theory of CR functions, Uspekhi Mat. Nauk, vol. 39, 1984, pp. 39–106
- with E.M. Chirka: Boundary properties of holomorphic functions of several complex variables, Itogi Nauki i Tekhniki. Ser. Sovrem. Probl. Mat., Vol. 4, 1975, pp. 13–142
- with B. S. Mityagin: Linear problems of complex analysis, Uspekhi Mat. Nauka, Vol. 26, 1971, pp. 93–152
- with A. G. Vitushkin: Linear superpositions of functions, Uspekhi Mat. Nauka (Russ., Math. Surveys), Volume 22, 1967, pp. 77–124
- Method of Integral Representations in Complex Analysis, in: Encyclopaedia of Mathematical Sciences, Volume 7, Several Complex Variables I, Moscow, VINITI, 1985, pp. 23-124, Springer, 1990, pp. 19–116.
