= U-bit =

In quantum mechanics, the u-bit or ubit is a proposed theoretical entity which arises in attempts to reformulate wave functions using only real numbers instead of the complex numbers conventionally used.

== Description ==
In order to discover the real probability of a given quantum event occurring, the conventional calculation carries out an operation, analogous to squaring, on an associated set of complex numbers. A complex number involves the use of the square root of minus one, a number which is described as "imaginary" in contrast to the familiar "real" numbers used for counting and describing real physical objects. Because the computed result is required to be a real number, information is lost in the computation.

This situation is regarded as unsatisfactory by some researchers, who seek an alternative formulation which does not involve the square root of minus one. Bill Wootters, of Williams College, Williamstown, Massachusetts, and colleagues have derived such a model. This model requires the presence of a universal entity which is quantum-entangled with every quantum wave and which he calls the u-bit.

Mathematically the u-bit may be represented as a vector rotating in a real two-dimensional plane. It has no known physical representation in the real world.
