= Mary Wootters =

American coding theorist

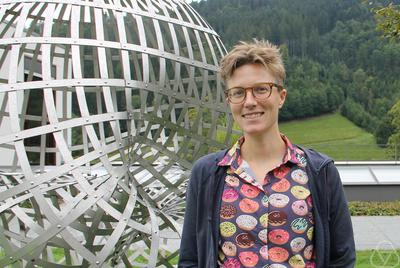
Wootters at Oberwolfach in 2025

Mary Katherine Wootters is an American coding theorist, information theorist, and theoretical computer scientist. She is an associate professor of computer science and electrical engineering and a member of the Institute for Computational and Mathematical Engineering at Stanford University.

== Education and career ==
Wootters majored in mathematics and computer science at Swarthmore College, graduating in 2008. She completed her Ph.D. at the University of Michigan in 2014; her dissertation, Any errors in this dissertation are probably fixable: topics in probability and error correcting codes, was supervised by Martin Strauss. She joined the Stanford faculty after postdoctoral research at Carnegie Mellon University.

In 2021, Wootters became a part of a team of engineers and computer scientists at Stanford with the aim of increasing processing power and memory capacity for battery powered smart devices. The team combined several energy-efficient hybrid chips to create the illusion of one larger chip. This allows for devices to run AI tasks much faster.

== Recognition ==
As a student at Swarthmore, Wootters won an honorable mention for the 2008 Alice T. Schafer Prize of the Association for Women in Mathematics, for undergraduate research on configuration spaces of linkages and stick numbers of knots. She was awarded the Sumner Byron Myers Prize for her PhD thesis. Wootters was one of the inaugural winners of the European Association for Theoretical Computer Science Distinguished Dissertation Award, in 2015. In 2019, she was the recipient of a National Science Foundation CAREER Award and a Sloan Research Fellowship. In 2022, Wootters won the James L. Massey Research & Teaching Award for Young Scholars of the IEEE Information Theory Society.

== Personal life ==
Wootters is married to Isaac Sorkin, a professor of economics at Stanford. Her father, William Wootters, is a well-known quantum information theorist, and her mother, Adrienne Wootters, is a professor of physics at the Massachusetts College of Liberal Arts.
