= Mei-Chi Shaw =

Taiwanese American mathematician

- 蕭美琪
- Born: 1955 (age 70–71); Taipei, Taiwan
- Education: National Taiwan University (BS); Princeton University (PhD)
- Spouse: Hsueh-Chia Chang
- Awards: Fellow of the American Mathematical Society Stefan Bergman Prize (2019)
- Scientific career
- Fields: Complex analysis Complex geometry
- Workplaces: University of Notre Dame
- Thesis: Hodge Theory on Domains with Cone-Like or Horn-Like Singularities (1981)
- Doctoral advisor: Joseph Kohn

Mei-Chi Shaw (Chinese: 蕭美琪; pinyin: Xiāo Měiqí; born 1955) is a Taiwanese-American mathematician. She is a professor of mathematics at the University of Notre Dame. Her research concerns partial differential equations and complex analysis.

== Life and career ==
Shaw was born in Taipei, Taiwan, in 1955. She graduated from National Taiwan University with a bachelor's degree in mathematics in 1977. She then completed doctoral studies in the United States, earning her Ph.D. in mathematics from Princeton University in 1981 under Joseph Kohn.

After receiving her doctorate, took a postdoctoral position at Purdue University During this time, she married her husband, Hsueh-Chia Chang. In 1983, Shaw took a tenure-track position at Texas A&M University, moving to University of Houston in 1986 and finally relocating to the University of Notre Dame in 1987, first as an associate professor and then as full professor.

== Awards and honors ==
In 2012, Shaw became a fellow of the American Mathematical Society. For 2019 she received the Stefan Bergman Prize.

== Selected publications ==
- Chen, So-Chin; Shaw, Mei-Chi. Partial differential equations in several complex variables. AMS/IP Studies in Advanced Mathematics, 19. American Mathematical Society, Providence, RI; International Press, Boston, MA, 2001. xii+380 pp. ISBN 0-8218-1062-6
- Shaw, Mei-Chi. L2-estimates and existence theorems for the tangential Cauchy-Riemann complex. Invent. Math. 82 (1985), no. 1, 133–150.
- Boas, Harold P.; Shaw, Mei-Chi Sobolev estimates for the Lewy operator on weakly pseudoconvex boundaries. Math. Ann. 274 (1986), no. 2, 221–231.
- Mei-Chi Shaw and Charles Stanton. “Complex Analysis in One Variable and Riemann Surfaces” Springer Graduate Textbooks in Mathematics (GTM #305) 2026. ISBN 978-3-031-93641-8
