= Kengo Hirachi =

Japanese mathematician (born 1964)

Kengo Hirachi (平地 健吾 Hirachi Kengo, born 30 November 1964) is a Japanese mathematician, specializing in CR geometry and mathematical analysis.

Hirachi received from Osaka University his B.S. in 1987, his M.S. in 1989, and his Dr.Sci., advised by Gen Komatsu, in 1994 with dissertation The second variation of the Bergman kernel for ellipsoids. He was a research assistant from 1989 to 1996 and a lecturer from 1996 to 2000 at Osaka University. He was an associate professor from 2000 to 2010 and a full professor from 2010 to the present at the University of Tokyo. He was a visiting professor at the Mathematical Sciences Research Institute from October 1995 to September 1996, at the Erwin Schrödinger Institute for Mathematical Physics from March 2004 to April 2004, at Princeton University from October 2004 to July 2005, and at the Institute for Advanced Study from January 2009 to April 2009.

Hirachi’s work employs a wide range of tools in geometry and analysis, including several complex variables, the complex Monge-Ampère equation, microlocal analysis, parabolic invariant theory, explicit computations, and computer algebra packages. In a paper in the Annals of Mathematics (2000) Hirachi constructed CR invariants of strongly pseudoconvex boundaries via a deep study of the logarithmic singularity of the Bergman kernel. He has proved various results linking the Bergman and Szegő kernels, and he has made significant progress to a program in which the Bergman kernel function plays a role analogous to the heat kernel of Riemannian geometry.

== Awards and honors ==
- Takebe Senior Prize (1999) of the Mathematical Society of Japan
- Geometry Prize (2003) of the Mathematical Society of Japan
- Stefan Bergman Prize (2006)
- Inoue Prize for Science (2012)
- Invited lecture at ICM, Seoul 2014
