= C. Robin Graham =

American mathematician

Charles Robin Graham is professor emeritus of mathematics at the University of Washington, known for a number of contributions to the field of conformal geometry and CR geometry; his collaboration with Charles Fefferman on the ambient construction has been particularly widely cited. The GJMS operators are, in part, named for him. He is a 2012 Fellow of the American Mathematical Society. Graham received his Ph.D. from Princeton University in 1981, under the direction of Elias Stein.

== Major publications ==
- Fefferman, Charles; Graham, C. Robin. Conformal invariants. The mathematical heritage of Élie Cartan (Lyon, 1984). Astérisque 1985, Numéro Hors Série, 95–116.
- Graham, C. Robin; Jenne, Ralph; Mason, Lionel J.; Sparling, George A.J. Conformally invariant powers of the Laplacian. I. Existence. J. London Math. Soc. (2) 46 (1992), no. 3, 557–565.
- Fefferman, Charles; Graham, C. Robin. The Ambient Metric. Annals of Mathematics Studies 178, Princeton University Press, 2012.
