= Wei Zhang (mathematician) =

Chinese mathematician (born 1981)

- 张伟
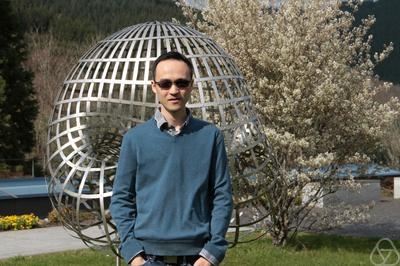
- Zhang at the Mathematical Research Institute of Oberwolfach in 2017
- Born: July 1981 (age 45)
- Education: Peking University (BS); Columbia University (PhD)
- Awards: SASTRA Ramanujan Prize (2010); Sloan Research Fellowship (2013); Morningside Gold Medal (2016); New Horizons In Mathematics Prize (2018); Clay Research Award (2019); Fellow of the American Mathematical Society (2019); Alexanderson Award (2025)
- Scientific career
- Fields: Mathematics
- Workplaces: Massachusetts Institute of Technology; Columbia University
- Thesis: Modularity of Generating Functions of Special Cycles on Shimura Varieties (2009)
- Doctoral advisor: Shou-Wu Zhang

Wei Zhang (Chinese: 张伟; born 1981) is a Chinese mathematician specializing in number theory. He is a professor of mathematics at the Massachusetts Institute of Technology.

== Early life and education ==
Zhang grew up in Sichuan province and attended Chengdu No.7 High School. He graduated from Peking University with a Bachelor of Science in mathematics in 2004 and earned his Ph.D. from Columbia University in 2009 under the supervision of Shou-Wu Zhang.

== Career ==
Zhang was a postdoctoral researcher and Benjamin Peirce Fellow at Harvard University from 2009 to 2011. He was a member of the mathematics faculty at Columbia University from 2011 to 2017, initially as an assistant professor before becoming a full professor in 2015. He has been a full professor at the Massachusetts Institute of Technology since 2017.

== Work ==
His collaborations with Zhiwei Yun, Xinyi Yuan and Xinwen Zhu have received attention in publications such as Quanta Magazine and Business Insider. In particular, his work with Zhiwei Yun on the Taylor expansion of L-functions is "already being hailed as one of the most exciting breakthroughs in an important area of number theory in the last 30 years."

Zhang has also made substantial contributions to the global Gan–Gross–Prasad conjecture.

== Awards ==
He was a recipient of the SASTRA Ramanujan Prize in 2010, for "far-reaching contributions by himself and in collaboration with others to a broad range of areas in mathematics, including number theory, automorphic forms, L-functions, trace formulas, representation theory, and algebraic geometry.” In 2013, Zhang received a Sloan Research Fellowship; in 2016 Zhang was awarded the Morningside Gold Medal of Mathematics. In December 2017 he was awarded 2018 New Horizons In Mathematics Prize together with Zhiwei Yun, Aaron Naber and Maryna Viazovska. In 2019 he received the Clay Research Award.

He was included in the 2019 class of fellows of the American Mathematical Society "for contributions to number theory, algebraic geometry and geometric representation theory". He was elected to the American Academy of Arts and Sciences in 2023.

== Publications (selected) ==
- "Automorphic period and the central value of Rankin-Selberg L-function", J. Amer. Math. Soc. 27 (2014), 541–612.
- "On arithmetic fundamental lemmas", Invent. Math., 188 (2012), No. 1, 197–252.
- "Fourier transform and the global Gan–Gross–Prasad conjecture for unitary groups", Annals of Mathematics 180 (2014), No. 3, 971–1049.
- "Selmer groups and the indivisibility of Heegner points", Cambridge Journal of Mathematics 2 (2014), no. 2, 191–253.
- (with Michael Rapoport, Ulrich Terstiege) "On the Arithmetic Fundamental Lemma in the minuscule case", Compositio Mathematica 149 (2013), no. 10, 1631–1666.
- (with Xinyi Yuan, Shou-Wu Zhang) "The Gross–Kohnen–Zagier theorem over totally real fields", Compositio Mathematica 145 (2009), no. 5, 1147–1162.
- (with Xinyi Yuan, Shou-Wu Zhang) "The Gross–Zagier formula on Shimura curves", Annals of Mathematics Studies vol. 184, Princeton University Press, 2012.
- (with Manjul Bhargava, Christopher Skinner) "A majority of elliptic curves over Q satisfy the Birch and Swinnerton-Dyer conjecture", preprint.
- (with Zhiwei Yun) "Shtukas and the Taylor expansion of L-functions", Annals of Mathematics 186 (2017), No. 3, 767–911.
- (with Xinyi Yuan, Shou-Wu Zhang) "Triple product L-series and Gross–Kudla–Schoen cycles", preprint.
- (with Yifeng Liu, Shou-Wu Zhang) "On p-adic Waldspurger formula", preprint.
