= Zhiwei Yun =

Chinese-American mathematician (born 1982)

- 恽之玮
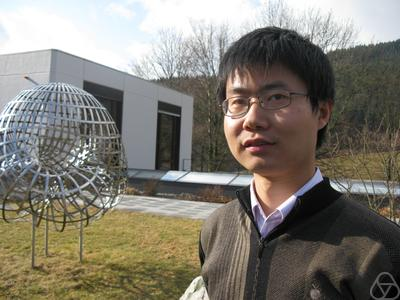
- Yun at Oberwolfach in 2012
- Born: September 1982 (age 43); Changzhou, China
- Education: Peking University (BS); Princeton University (PhD)
- Known for: Contributions to number theory, representation theory and algebraic geometry
- Awards: Gold Medal, IMO (2000); SASTRA Ramanujan Prize (2012); 2018 New Horizons In Mathematics Prize (2018); Morningside Medal (2019)
- Scientific career
- Fields: Mathematics
- Workplaces: Massachusetts Institute of Technology; Stanford University; Yale University
- Doctoral advisor: Robert MacPherson

Zhiwei Yun (Chinese: 恽之玮; pinyin: Yùn Zhīwěi; born September 1982) is a Chinese-born American mathematician and writer. He is a Professor of Mathematics at MIT specializing in number theory, algebraic geometry and representation theory, with a particular focus on the Langlands program.

He was previously a C. L. E. Moore instructor at Massachusetts Institute of Technology from 2010 to 2012, assistant professor then associate professor at Stanford University from 2012 to 2016, and professor at Yale University from 2016 to 2017.

== Early life and education ==
Yun was born in Changzhou, China. As a high schooler, he participated in the International Mathematical Olympiad in 2000; he received a gold medal with a perfect score. Yun received his bachelor's degree from Peking University in 2004. In 2009, he received his Ph.D. from Princeton University, under the direction of Robert MacPherson.

== Work ==
His collaborations with Wei Zhang, Xinyi Yuan and Xinwen Zhu have received attention in publications such as Quanta Magazine and Business Insider. In particular, his work with Wei Zhang on the Taylor expansion of L-functions is "already being hailed as one of the most exciting breakthroughs in an important area of number theory in the last 30 years."

Yun also made substantial contributions towards the global Gan–Gross–Prasad conjecture.

== Awards ==
Yun was awarded the SASTRA Ramanujan Prize in 2012 for his "fundamental contributions to several areas that lie at the interface of representation theory, algebraic geometry and number theory."

In December 2017, he was awarded the 2018 New Horizons In Mathematics Prize together with Wei Zhang, Aaron Naber and Maryna Viazovska.

He was included in the 2019 class of fellows of the American Mathematical Society "for contributions to geometry, number theory, and representation theory, including his construction of motives with exceptional Galois groups". In 2019 he received the Morningside Medal jointly with Xinwen Zhu.

== Selected publications ==
- Yun, Zhiwei; Vincent, Christelle (2015). "Galois representations attached to moments of Kloosterman sums and conjectures of Evans". Compositio Mathematica. 151 (1): 68–120. arXiv:1308.3920. doi:10.1112/S0010437X14007593.
- (with Davesh Maulik) Maulik, Davesh; Yun, Zhiwei (2014). "Macdonald formula for curves with planar singularities". Journal für die reine und angewandte Mathematik. 2014 (694): 27–48. arXiv:1107.2175. doi:10.1515/crelle-2012-0093. S2CID 5317997.
- Yun, Zhiwei (2014). "Motives with exceptional Galois groups and the inverse Galois problem". Inventiones Mathematicae. 196 (2): 267–337. arXiv:1112.2434. Bibcode:2014InMat.196..267Y. doi:10.1007/s00222-013-0469-9.
- (with Roman Bezrukavnikov) Bezrukavnikov, Roman; Yun, Zhiwei (2013). "On Koszul duality for Kac–Moody groups". Representation Theory. 17: 1–98. arXiv:1101.1253. doi:10.1090/S1088-4165-2013-00421-1.
- (with Ngô Bảo Châu and Jochen Heinloth) Heinloth, Jochen; Ngô, Bao-Châu; Yun, Zhiwei (2013). "Kloosterman sheaves for reductive groups". Annals of Mathematics. 177 (1): 241–310. arXiv:1005.2765. doi:10.4007/annals.2013.177.1.5.
- Yun, Zhiwei (2012). "Langlands duality and global Springer theory". Compositio Mathematica. 148 (3): 835–867. doi:10.1112/S0010437X11007433.
- Yun, Zhiwei (2011). "Global Springer theory". Advances in Mathematics. 228 (1): 266–328. doi:10.1016/j.aim.2011.05.012.
- Gordon, Julia; Yun, Zhiwei (2011). "The fundamental lemma of Jacquet and Rallis". Duke Mathematical Journal. 156 (2): 167–227. arXiv:0901.0900. doi:10.1215/00127094-2010-210. S2CID 14295843.
- Yun, Zhiwei (2009). "Weights of mixed tilting sheaves and geometric Ringel duality". Selecta Mathematica. New Series. 14 (2): 299–320. arXiv:0805.1495. doi:10.1007/s00029-008-0066-8.
- (with Alexei Oblomkov) Oblomkov, Alexei; Yun, Zhiwei (2016). "Geometric representations of graded and rational Cherednik algebras". Advances in Mathematics. 292: 601–706. arXiv:1407.5685. doi:10.1016/j.aim.2016.01.015.
- (with Wei Zhang) Yun, Zhiwei; Zhang, Wei (2017). "Shtukas and the Taylor expansion of L-functions". Annals of Mathematics. 186 (3): 767–911. arXiv:1512.02683. doi:10.4007/annals.2017.186.3.2.
