= Shou-Wu Zhang =

Chinese-American mathematician (born 1962)

- 张寿武
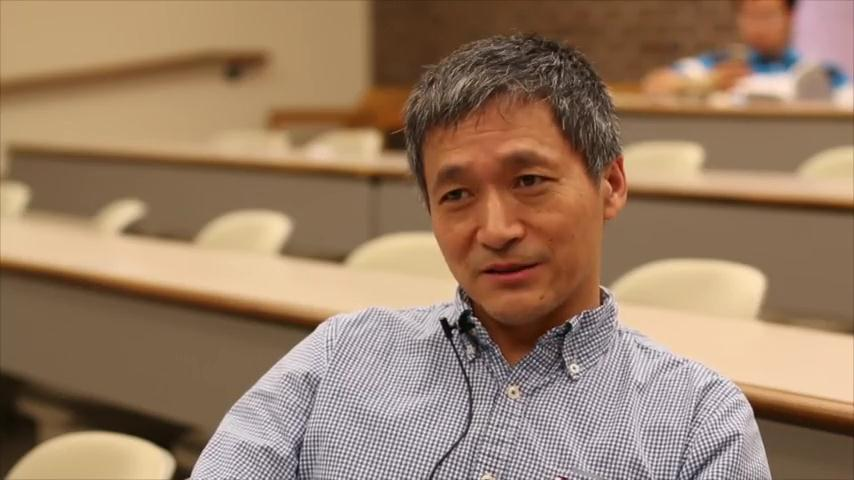
- Shou-Wu Zhang in 2014
- Born: October 9, 1962 (age 64); Hexian, Anhui, China
- Education: Sun Yat-sen University (BS); Chinese Academy of Sciences (MS); Columbia University (PhD)
- Known for: Arakelov theory; Arithmetic dynamics; Bogomolov conjecture; Gross–Zagier theorem
- Awards: List of Awards: Sloan Fellowship (1997); Morningside Medal (1998); Clay Prize Fellow (2003); Guggenheim Fellow (2009); American Academy of Arts and Sciences Fellow (2011); American Mathematical Society Fellow (2016); ICBS Andrew Wiles Medal(2026)
- Scientific career
- Fields: Mathematics
- Workplaces: Princeton University; Columbia University; Institute for Advanced Study
- Thesis: Positive Line Bundles on Arithmetic Surfaces (1991)
- Doctoral advisor: Lucien Szpiro
- Other academic advisors: Wang Yuan
- Doctoral students: Wei Zhang; Xinyi Yuan; Tian Ye; Yifeng Liu
- Other notable students: Bhargav Bhatt

Shou-Wu Zhang (Chinese: 张寿武; pinyin: Zhāng Shòuwǔ; born October 9, 1962) is a Chinese-American mathematician known for his work in number theory and arithmetic geometry. He is currently a professor of mathematics at Princeton University.

== Biography ==
=== Early life ===
Shou-Wu Zhang was born in Hexian, Ma'anshan, Anhui, China, on October 9, 1962. Zhang grew up in a poor farming household and could not attend school until eighth grade due to the Cultural Revolution. He spent most of his childhood raising ducks in the countryside and self-studying mathematics textbooks that he acquired from sent-down youth in trades for frogs. By the time he entered junior high school at the age of fourteen, he had taught himself calculus and had become interested in number theory after reading about Chen Jingrun's proof of Chen's theorem which made substantial progress on Goldbach's conjecture.

=== Education ===
Zhang was admitted to the Sun Yat-sen University chemistry department in 1980 after scoring poorly on his mathematics entrance examinations, but he later transferred to the mathematics department after feigning color blindness and received his bachelor's degree in mathematics in 1983. He then studied under analytic number theorist Wang Yuan at the Chinese Academy of Sciences where he received his master's degree in 1986. In 1986, Zhang was brought to the United States to pursue his doctoral studies at Columbia University by Dorian M. Goldfeld. He initially studied under Goldfeld and then Hervé Jacquet, before deciding to work with Lucien Szpiro, a visiting professor at Columbia at the time, and Gerd Faltings at Princeton University. He received his PhD at Columbia University under the supervision of Szpiro in 1991.

=== Career ===
Zhang was a member of the Institute for Advanced Study and an assistant professor at Princeton University from 1991 to 1996. In 1996, Zhang moved back to Columbia University where he was a tenured professor until 2013. He has been a professor at Princeton University since 2011 was named the Henry Burchard Fine Professor from 2014 to 2015, and was named a Eugene Higgins Professor in 2021.

Zhang is on the editorial boards of: Acta Mathematica Sinica, Algebra & Number Theory, Forum of Mathematics, Journal of Differential Geometry, National Science Review, Pure and Applied Mathematics Quarterly, Science in China, and Research in Number Theory. He has previously served on the editorial boards of: Journal of Number Theory, Journal of the American Mathematical Society, Journal of Algebraic Geometry, and International Journal of Number Theory.

== Research ==
Zhang's doctoral thesis Positive line bundles on Arithmetic Surfaces (Zhang 1992) proved a Nakai–Moishezon type theorem in intersection theory using a result from differential geometry already proved in Tian Gang's doctoral thesis. In a series of subsequent papers (Zhang 1993, 1995a, 1995b, Szpiro, Ullmo & Zhang 1997), he further developed his theory of 'positive line bundles' in Arakelov theory which culminated in a proof of the Bogomolov conjecture with Emmanuel Ullmo and a further generalization of the Bogomolov conjecture (Zhang 1998).

In 2001, Zhang proved a generalization of the Gross–Zagier theorem to modular abelian varieties of GL(2) type (Zhang 2001). In particular, the result led him to a proof of the rank one Birch-Swinnerton-Dyer conjecture for modular abelian varieties of GL(2) type over totally real fields through his work relating the Néron–Tate height of Heegner points to special values of L-functions in (Zhang 1997, 2001). In 2013, Zhang and his former doctoral students Xinyi Yuan and Wei Zhang established a full generalization of the Gross–Zagier theorem to all Shimura curves (Yuan, Zhang & W. Zhang 2009 Yuan, Zhang & W. Zhang 2013).

In arithmetic dynamics, Zhang (1995a, 2006) posed conjectures on the Zariski density of non-fibered endomorphisms of quasi-projective varieties and Ghioca, Tucker, and Zhang (2011) proposed a dynamical analogue of the Manin–Mumford conjecture.

In 2018, Yuan and Zhang (2018) proved the averaged Colmez conjecture which was shown to imply the André–Oort conjecture for Siegel modular varieties by Jacob Tsimerman.

== Awards ==
Zhang has received a Sloan Foundation Research Fellowship (1997) and a Morningside Gold Medal of Mathematics (1998). He is also a Clay Foundation Prize Fellow (2003), Guggenheim Foundation Fellow (2009), Fellow of the American Academy of Arts and Sciences (2011), and Fellow of the American Mathematical Society (2016)., Andrew Wiles Medal of International Congress of Basic Sciences. He was an invited speaker at the International Congress of Mathematicians in 1998.

== Selected publications ==
=== Arakelov theory ===
- Zhang, Shou-Wu (1992), "Positive line bundles on arithmetic surfaces", Annals of Mathematics, 136 (3): 569–587, doi:10.2307/2946601, JSTOR 2946601.
- Zhang, Shou-Wu (1993), "Admissible pairing on a curve", Inventiones Mathematicae, 112 (1): 421–432, Bibcode:1993InMat.112..171Z, doi:10.1007/BF01232429, S2CID 120229374.
- Zhang, Shou-Wu (1995a), "Small points and adelic metrics", Journal of Algebraic Geometry, 8 (1): 281–300.
- Zhang, Shou-Wu (1995b), "Positive line bundles on arithmetic varieties", Journal of the American Mathematical Society, 136 (3): 187–221, doi:10.1090/S0894-0347-1995-1254133-7.
- Zhang, Shou-Wu (1996), "Heights and reductions of semi-stable varieties", Compositio Mathematica, 104 (1): 77–105.
- Zhang, Shou-Wu (2010), "Gross–Schoen cycles and Dualising sheaves", Invent. Math., 179 (1): 1–73, arXiv:0812.0371, Bibcode:2010InMat.179....1Z, doi:10.1007/s00222-009-0209-3, S2CID 5698835.
- Yuan, Xinyi; Zhang, Shou-Wu (2017), "The arithmetic Hodge index theorem for adelic line bundles", Math. Ann., 367 (3–4): 1123–1171, doi:10.1007/s00208-016-1414-1, S2CID 2813125.

==== Bogomolov conjecture ====
- Szpiro, Lucien; Ullmo, Emmanuel; Zhang, Shou-Wu (1997), "Equirépartition des petits points", Inventiones Mathematicae, 127 (2): 337–347, Bibcode:1997InMat.127..337S, doi:10.1007/s002220050123, S2CID 119668209.
- Zhang, Shou-Wu (1998), "Equidistribution of small points on abelian varieties", Annals of Mathematics, 147 (1): 159–165, doi:10.2307/120986, JSTOR 120986.

=== Gross–Zagier formulae ===
- Zhang, Shou-Wu (1997), "Heights of Heegner cycles and derivatives of L-series", Inventiones Mathematicae, 130 (1): 99–152, Bibcode:1997InMat.130...99Z, doi:10.1007/s002220050179, S2CID 10537873.
- Zhang, Shou-Wu (2001), "Heights of Heegner points on Shimura curves", Annals of Mathematics, 153 (1): 27–147, arXiv:math/0101269, doi:10.2307/2661372, JSTOR 2661372, S2CID 119624920.
- Yuan, Xinyi; Zhang, Shou-Wu; Zhang, Wei (2009), "The Gross–Kohnen–Zagier Theorem over Totally Real Fields", Compositio Mathematica, 145 (5): 1147–1162, doi:10.1112/S0010437X08003734.
- Yuan, Xinyi; Zhang, Shou-Wu; Zhang, Wei (2013), The Gross–Zagier formula on Shimura curves, Annals of Mathematics Studies, vol. 184, ISBN 9780691155913.
- Liu, Yifeng; Zhang, Shou-Wu; Zhang, Wei (2018a), "A p-adic Waldspurger formula", Duke Mathematical Journal, 167 (4): 743–833, arXiv:1511.08172, doi:10.1215/00127094-2017-0045, S2CID 4867572.
- Yuan, Xinyi; Zhang, Shou-Wu (2018b), "On the averaged Colmez conjecture", Annals of Mathematics, 187 (2): 553–638, arXiv:1507.06903, doi:10.4007/annals.2018.187.2.4, S2CID 118916754.

=== Arithmetic dynamics ===
- Zhang, Shou-Wu (2006), "Distributions in algebraic dynamics", in Yau, Shing-Tung (ed.), Essays in geometry in memory of S.S. Chern, Surveys in Differential Geometry, vol. 10, Somerville, MA: International Press, pp. 381–430, doi:10.4310/SDG.2005.v10.n1.a9, MR 2408228.
- Ghioca, Dragos; Tucker, Thomas J.; Zhang, Shou-Wu (2011), "Towards a dynamical Manin-Mumford conjecture", International Mathematics Research Notices, 22: 5109–5122, doi:10.1093/imrn/rnq283, MR 2854724.
