= Sebastián Hurtado-Salazar =

Colombian mathematician

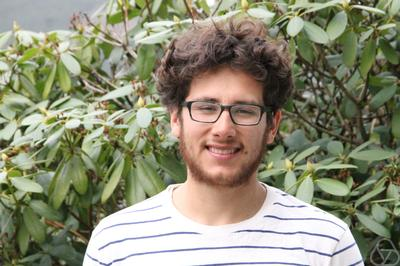
- 2014 in Oberwolfach
- Education: University of California, Berkeley (Ph.D.); IMPA (M.S.); National University of Colombia (B.S.)
- Known for: Zimmer's conjecture
- Awards: New Horizons in Mathematics Prize (2022)
- Scientific career
- Fields: Dynamical systems Geometry; Topology
- Workplaces: Yale University
- Thesis: Homomorphisms between groups of diffeomorphisms (2014)
- Doctoral advisor: Ian Agol
- Website: sites.google.com/view/sebastianhurtado/home

Sebastián Hurtado-Salazar is a Colombian mathematician working in dynamical systems, geometry and topology. He is a professor at Yale University. In 2017, together with Aaron Brown and David Fisher, he proved Zimmer's conjecture.

== Education ==
Hurtado-Salazar completed his mathematical undergraduate education at the National University of Colombia and obtained a master degree in mathematics at the Instituto Nacional de Matemática Pura e Aplicada. He obtained his PhD at the University of California at Berkeley in 2014 with Ian Agol as advisor (thesis: Homomorphisms between groups of diffeomorphisms).

== Honors ==
He was a Sloan Fellow. He shared the 2022 New Horizons in Mathematics Prize with Aaron Brown. In 2023, he shared the Frontiers of Science Award with David Fisher and Aaron Brown.

== Selected publications ==
- A. Brown, D. Fisher, S. Hurtado (2020). "Zimmer's conjecture for actions of $\text{SL}(m,\mathbb{Z})$", Inventiones Mathematicae 221 (3), pp. 1001-1060. https://arxiv.org/abs/1710.02735 (announced in 2017)
- A. Brown, D. Fisher, S. Hurtado (2022). "Zimmer's conjecture: Subexponential growth, measure rigidity, and strong property (T)". Annals of Mathematics, 196 (3), pp. 891-940. https://doi.org/10.4007/annals.2022.196.3.1
