= Mu-Tao Wang =

Taiwanese mathematician

- 王慕道
- Education: National Taiwan University (BS, MS); Harvard University (PhD)
- Known for: Quasilocal mass–energy Higher co-dimensional mean curvature flow
- Awards: Morningside Gold Medal of Mathematics; Sloan Research Fellow; Chern Prize
- Scientific career
- Fields: Differential geometry General relativity
- Workplaces: Stanford University; Columbia University; Academia Sinica
- Thesis: Generalized harmonic maps and representations of discrete groups (1998)
- Doctoral advisor: Shing-Tung Yau

Mu-Tao Wang (Chinese: 王慕道; pinyin: Wáng Mùdào) is a Taiwanese mathematician who is a professor of mathematics at Columbia University.

== Education ==
In 1984, Wang enrolled at National Taiwan University (NTU) with the initial intent to study international business but, after a year, he switched to mathematics. He graduated from NTU with his Bachelor of Science (B.S.) in 1988 and his Master of Science (M.S.) in 1992, both in mathematics. Wang then completed advanced studies in the United States, earning his Ph.D. in mathematics in 1998 from Harvard University. His doctoral dissertation, "Generalized harmonic maps and representations of discrete groups," was supervised by Fields Medal laureate Shing-Tung Yau.

== Career ==
Wang joined the Columbia faculty as an assistant professor in 2001, and was appointed full professor in 2009. Before joining the faculty at Columbia, Wang was Szego Assistant Professor at Stanford University.

He was a Sloan Research Fellow from 2003 to 2005. In 2007, he was named a Kavli Fellow of the National Academy of Sciences and was awarded the Chern Prize. Wang is a Fellow of the American Mathematical Society and won the Morningside Gold Medal of Mathematics in 2010.

In 2010, Wang delivered the plenary address at the International Congress of Chinese Mathematicians, and was plenary speaker at the International Congress on Mathematical Physics. In addition, he was also plenary speaker at the International Conference on Differential Geometry in 2011. He was elected to Academia Sinica in 2022.

After winning the Morningside Medal, Wang told interviewers that he did not consider himself a particularly good student and did not consistently make good grades. He struggled with studying topics which did not interest him just for the grade, but spends a lot of time on subjects which interested him. He credits his career in mathematics to two people: his mother and his thesis adviser Shing-Tung Yau. He cites his mother's support and understanding of his decision to switch to mathematics in university despite it being a much less lucrative field, and describes meeting Yau in 1992 as the pivotal point in his life when he decided to make mathematics research his primary focus.

== Work ==
Wang's research is focused in the fields of differential geometry and mathematical physics, specifically general relativity. He has studied higher co-dimensional mean curvature flow extensively, leading to criteria relating to the flow's existence, regularity, and convergence. In the field of general relativity, he is especially known for his work on quasilocal mass–energy; the Wang-Yau quasi-local mass is named in his honor.

== Selected bibliography ==
- "A fixed point theorem of isometry action on Riemannian manifolds", Journal of Differential Geometry 50 (1998), no. 2, 249-267
- "Mean curvature flow of surfaces in Einstein four-manifolds", Journal of Differential Geometry 57 (2001), no. 2, 301-338
- "Long-time existence and convergence of graphic mean curvature flow in arbitrary codimension", Inventiones Mathematicae 148 (2002), no. 3, 525-543
- (with Knut Smoczyk) "Mean curvature flows of Lagrangian submanifolds with convex potentials", Journal of Differential Geometry 62 (2002), no. 2, 243-257
- "The Dirichlet problem for the minimal surface system in arbitrary codimension", Communications on Pure and Applied Mathematics 57 (2004), no. 2, 267-281
- (with Shing-Tung Yau) "Isometric embeddings into the Minkowski space and new quasi-local mass", Communications in Mathematical Physics 288 (2009), no. 3, 919-942
- (with Ivana Medoš) "Deforming symplectomorphisms of complex projective spaces by the mean curvature flow", Journal of Differential Geometry 87 (2011), no. 2, 309-342
- (with Simon Brendle and Pei-Ken Hung) "A Minkowski type inequality for hypersurfaces in the Anti-de Sitter-Schwarzschild manifold", Communications on Pure and Applied Mathematics
- (with Po-Ning Chen and Shing-Tung Yau) "Quasilocal angular momentum and center of mass in general relativity", arXiv:1312.0990
