= Sijue Wu =

Chinese-American mathematician

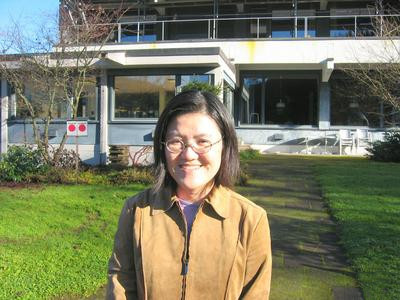
- Sijue Wu at Oberwolfach, 2006
- Born: May 15, 1964 (age 62)
- Education: Yale University (Ph.D.); Peking University (B.S., M.S.)
- Scientific career
- Fields: Mathematics
- Workplaces: University of Michigan
- Thesis: Nonlinear Singular Integrals and Analytic Dependence (1990)
- Doctoral advisor: Ronald Coifman

Sijue Wu (Chinese: 邬似珏; pinyin: Wū Sìjué; born May 15, 1964) is a Chinese American mathematician who works as the Robert W. and Lynne H. Browne Professor of Mathematics at the University of Michigan. Her research involves the mathematics of water waves.

== Education and career ==
Wu earned bachelor's and master's degrees in 1983 and 1986 from Peking University. She completed her doctorate in 1990 from Yale University, under the supervision of Ronald Coifman. After a temporary instructorship at New York University, she became an assistant professor at Northwestern University. She moved in 1996 to the University of Iowa and again to the University of Maryland, College Park in 1998. She became the Browne Professor at the University of Michigan in 2008.

== Awards and honors ==
A 1997 paper by Wu in Inventiones Mathematicae, "Well-posedness in Sobolev spaces of the full water wave problem in 2-D", was the subject of a featured review in Mathematical Reviews.

Wu was an invited speaker at the International Congress of Mathematicians in 2002, speaking on partial differential equations.

She won the Ruth Lyttle Satter Prize in Mathematics and the silver Morningside Medal in 2001, and the gold Morningside Medal in 2010, becoming the first female mathematician to win the gold medal. She was elected to the American Academy of Arts and Sciences in 2022.
