= Wotao Yin =

Professor

Wotao Yin is an applied mathematician and professor of Mathematics department at the University of California, Los Angeles in Los Angeles, California. He currently conducts research in optimization, parallel and distributed computing, and inverse problems.

== Education ==
Wotao Yin received his PhD in operations research at Columbia University in 2006 under the supervision of Donald Goldfarb. His dissertation title was The TV-L1 Model Theory, Computation and Applications.

== Awards and honours ==
In 2016, Wotao Yin was awarded the gold Morningside Gold Medal at the International Congress of Chinese Mathematicians, which is awarded to "outstanding mathematicians of Chinese descent to encourage them in their pursuit of mathematical truth". He was also awarded an NSF CAREER award in 2008, and was made an Alfred P. Sloan Fellow in 2009.
