= Tian Ye (mathematician) =

Chinese mathematician

- Born: October 1971 (age 54); Neijiang, Sichuan, China
- Education: Sichuan University (BS, MS); Columbia University (PhD)
- Awards: Morningside Silver Medal (2007); Morningside Gold Medal (2013); ICTP Ramanujan Prize 2013
- Scientific career
- Fields: Mathematics
- Workplaces: Chinese Academy of Sciences
- Thesis: Euler Systems of CM Points on Shimura Curves (2003)
- Doctoral advisor: Shou-Wu Zhang

Tian Ye or Ye Tian (Chinese: 田野; born November 1971) is a Chinese mathematician known for his research in number theory and arithmetic geometry. He is a professor of mathematics at the Chinese Academy of Sciences and is the deputy director of its Morningside Center of Mathematics.

== Early life and education ==
Tian Ye was born in Neijiang, Sichuan, China in November 1971. From 1989 to 1996, he studied at Sichuan University where he received his B.S. and M.S. He received his Ph.D. in mathematics under Shou-Wu Zhang at Columbia University in 2003. He was a member at the Institute for Advanced Study from 2003 to 2004.

== Career ==
Tian was a post-doctoral researcher at McGill University from 2004 to 2006. He has been a professor at the Chinese Academy of Sciences since 2006. He is the deputy director of the Morningside Center of Mathematics.

== Awards and honors ==
Tian received the ICTP Ramanujan Prize (2013) and the Morningside Medal (Silver 2007, Gold 2013). He was elected a member of the Chinese Academy of Sciences in 2023.

He was an invited speaker at the International Congress of Mathematicians in 2022.

== Selected publications ==
- Burungale, Ashay; Tian, Ye (2020). "p-converse to a theorem of Gross–Zagier, Kolyvagin and Rubin". Inventiones Mathematicae. 220 (1): 211–253..
- Diaconu, Adrian; Tian, Ye (2005), "Twisted Fermat curves over totally real fields", Annals of Mathematics, Second Series, 162 (3): 1353–1376, arXiv:0706.0470, doi:10.4007/annals.2005.162.1353, JSTOR 20159945, MR 2179733, S2CID 15523427.
- Li, Jian-Shu; Sun, Binyong; Tian, Ye (2011), "The multiplicity one conjecture for local theta correspondences" (PDF), Inventiones Mathematicae, 184 (1): 117–124, Bibcode:2011InMat.184..117L, doi:10.1007/s00222-010-0287-2, MR 2782253, S2CID 122139021.
- Tian, Ye (2014), "Congruent numbers and Heegner points", Cambridge Journal of Mathematics, 2 (1): 117–161, arXiv:1210.8231, doi:10.4310/CJM.2014.v2.n1.a4, MR 3272014, S2CID 55390076.
