= Yves André =

French mathematician (born 1959)

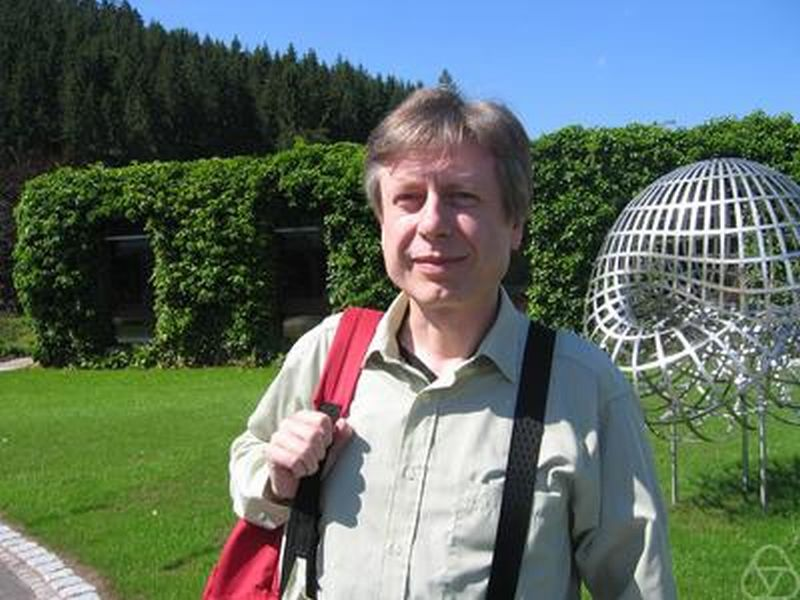
- André at Oberwolfach, 2007
- Born: December 11, 1959 (age 66)
- Education: Pierre and Marie Curie University
- Awards: Prix Paul Doistau–Émile Blutet (2011); Member of the Academia Europaea (2015)
- Scientific career
- Doctoral advisor: Daniel Bertrand

Yves André (born December 11, 1959) is a French mathematician, specializing in arithmetic geometry.

== Biography ==
André received his doctorate in 1984 from Pierre and Marie Curie University (Paris VI) with thesis advisor Daniel Bertrand and thesis Structure de Hodge, équations différentielles p-adiques, et indépendance algébrique de périodes d'intégrales abéliennes. He became at CNRS in 1985 a Researcher, in 2000 a Research Director 2nd Class, and in 2009 a Research Director 1st Class (at École Normale Supérieure and Institut de mathématiques de Jussieu – Paris Rive Gauche).

== Research ==
In 1989, he formulated the one-dimensional-subvariety case of what is now known as the André-Oort conjecture on special subvarieties of Shimura varieties. Only partial results have been proven so far; by André himself and by Jonathan Pila in 2009. In 2016, André used Scholze's method of perfectoid spaces to prove Melvin Hochster's direct summand conjecture that any finite extension of a regular commutative ring splits as a module.

== Awards ==
In 2011, André received the Prix Paul Doistau–Émile Blutet of the Académie des Sciences. In 2015, he was elected as a Member of the Academia Europaea. He was an invited speaker at the 2018 International Congress of Mathematicians in Rio de Janeiro and gave a talk titled Perfectoid spaces and the homological conjectures.

== Selected publications ==
- André, Yves (1989). G-Functions and Geometry A Publication of the Max-Planck-Institut für Mathematik, Bonn. Wiesbaden. ISBN 978-3-663-14108-2. OCLC 860266118.
- André, Yves (18 October 2022). "Mumford-Tate groups of mixed Hodge structures and the theorem of the fixed part". Compositio Mathematica (in French). 82 (1): 1–24. ISSN 1570-5846.
- Andre, Yves (1996). "On the Shafarevich and Tate conjectures for hyperkähler varieties". Mathematische Annalen. 305 (1). Springer Science and Business Media LLC: 205–248. doi:10.1007/bf01444219. ISSN 0025-5831. S2CID 122949797.
- André, Yves; Baldassarri, F. (2001). De Rham cohomology of differential modules on algebraic varieties. Basel, Switzerland: Birkhäuser. ISBN 978-3-0348-8336-8. OCLC 679321692.
- Period mappings and differential equations. From C to Cp: Tohoku-Hokkaido Lectures in Arithmetic Geometry, Tokyo, Memoirs Mathematical Society of Japan 2003 (with appendix by F. Kato, N. Tsuzuki)
- "Une introduction aux motifs (Motifs purs, motifs mixtes, périodes)". Société Mathématique de France (in French).
- André, Yves (2009). "Galois theory, motives and transcendental numbers". Renormalization and Galois Theories. IRMA Lectures in Mathematics and Theoretical Physics. Vol. 15. Zuerich, Switzerland: European Mathematical Society Publishing House. pp. 165–177. doi:10.4171/073-1/4. ISBN 978-3-03719-073-9. S2CID 16880343.
- André, Yves (7 December 2017). "La conjecture du facteur direct". Publications mathématiques de l'IHÉS (in French). 127 (1). Springer Science and Business Media LLC: 71–93. arXiv:1609.00345. doi:10.1007/s10240-017-0097-9. ISSN 0073-8301. S2CID 254170253.
