= Yuan Xinyi =

Yuan Xinyi may refer to:

- Yuen Shun-yi or Yuan Xinyi, Chinese actor and stunt coordinator
- Xinyi Yuan, Chinese mathematician
