= Chern Prize (ICCM) =

International Congress of Chinese Mathematicians prize

The Chern Prize in Mathematics was established in 2001 (25 years ago) in honor of Professor Shiing-Shen Chern. The Chern Prize is presented every three years at the International Congress of Chinese Mathematicians to Chinese mathematicians and those of Chinese descent for "exceptional contributions to mathematical research or to public service activities in support of mathematics". Winners are selected by a committee of mathematicians to recognize the achievements of mathematicians of Chinese descent. In 2010, a special commemorative event was held in Beijing in addition to the normal award presentation to celebrate the centennial of Professor Chern's birth.

== Past winners ==
Year	Medalists	Institution
2001	Song-Sun Lin; Jiu-Kang Yu	Chiao Tung University; Purdue University
2004	Fanghua Lin; Lo Yang	New York University; Chinese Academy of Sciences
2007	Shiu-Yuen Cheng; Mu-Tao Wang	Hong Kong University of Science and Technology; Columbia University
2010	Jiaxing Hong; Conan Nai-Chung Leung; Winnie Li	Fudan University; Chinese University of Hong Kong; National Center of Theoretical Sciences (Taiwan)
2013	Bong Lian; Si-Chen Lee	Brandeis University; National Taiwan University
2016	Ronnie Chan; Xiping Zhu	Morningside Group; Sun Yat-sen University
2019	Wen-Wei Lin; Stephen Shing-Toung Yau	National Yang Ming Chiao Tung University; Tsinghua University

== See also ==
- Morningside Medal
- List of mathematics awards
