= SASTRA Ramanujan Prize =

Indian mathematics award

The SASTRA Ramanujan Prize is an annual prize awarded to outstanding contributions in mathematics. It was incorporated and is awarded by the Shanmugha Arts, Science, Technology & Research Academy (SASTRA) in Thanjavur district, Tamil Nadu, India. The award is named after Indian mathematician Srinivasa Ramanujan. It is awarded to individuals younger than 32 years, and carries a cash prize of $10,000. It aims to serve as a platform to encourage young mathematicians to explore uncharted areas of mathematics.

== Winners ==
^{F} denotes recipients of Fields Medal.

Year	Name	Institution
2005	Manjul Bhargava^{F}	Princeton University
2005	Kannan Soundararajan	University of Michigan
2006	Terence Tao^{F}	University of California, Los Angeles
2007	Ben Green	University of Cambridge
2008	Akshay Venkatesh^{F}	Stanford University
2009	Kathrin Bringmann	University of Cologne
2010	Wei Zhang	Harvard University
2011	Roman Holowinsky	Ohio State University
2012	Zhiwei Yun	Stanford University
2013	Peter Scholze^{F}	University of Bonn
2014	James Maynard^{F}	University of Oxford
2015	Jacob Tsimerman^{F}	University of Toronto
2016	Kaisa Matomäki	University of Turku
2016	Maksym Radziwill	Northwestern University
2017	Maryna Viazovska^{F}	École Polytechnique Fédérale de Lausanne
2018	Yifeng Liu	Yale University
2018	Jack Thorne	University of Cambridge
2019	Adam Harper	University of Warwick
2020	Shai Evra	Hebrew University of Jerusalem
2021	Will Sawin	Columbia University
2022	Yunqing Tang	University of California, Berkeley
2023	Ruixiang Zhang	University of California, Berkeley
2024	Alexander Dunn	Georgia Institute of Technology
2025	Alexander Smith	Northwestern University
2026	Sarah Peluse	Stanford University

== See also ==
- ICTP Ramanujan Prize
- List of mathematics awards
