= Kannan Soundararajan =

American mathematician and professor (born 1973)

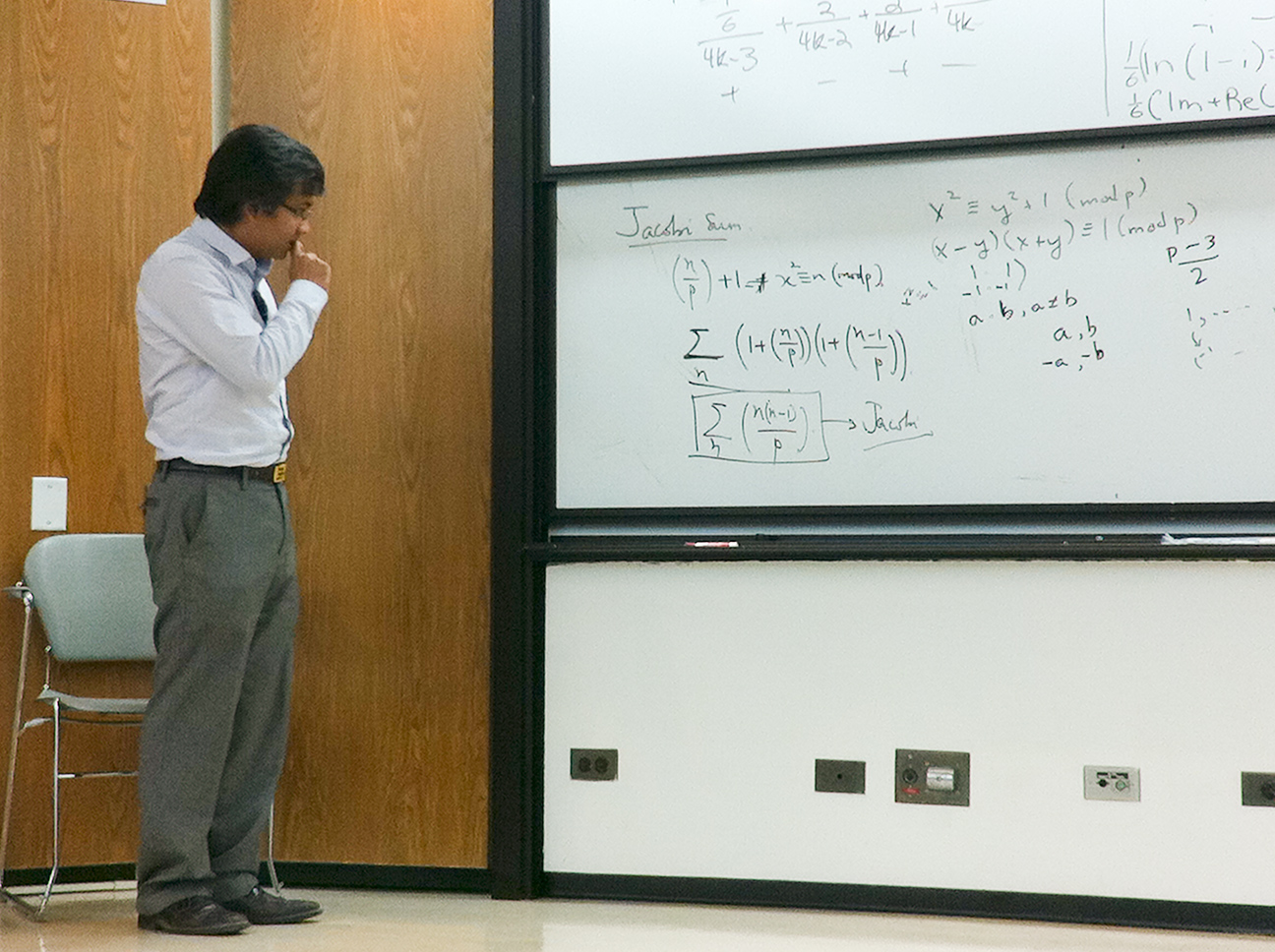
- Soundararajan teaching at Stanford University
- Born: December 27, 1973 (age 52)
- Education: University of Michigan; Princeton University
- Awards: Ostrowski Prize (2011); Infosys Prize (2011); SASTRA Ramanujan Prize (2005); Salem Prize (2003); Morgan Prize (1995)
- Scientific career
- Fields: Mathematics
- Workplaces: Stanford University; University of Michigan
- Doctoral advisor: Peter Sarnak
- Doctoral students: Sarah Peluse; Maksym Radziwill

Kannan Soundararajan (born December 27, 1973) is an Indian-born American mathematician and a professor of mathematics at Stanford University. Before moving to Stanford in 2006, he was a faculty member at University of Michigan, where he had also pursued his undergraduate studies. His main research interest is in analytic number theory, particularly in the subfields of automorphic L-functions, and multiplicative number theory.

== Early life ==
Soundararajan grew up in Chennai and was a student at Padma Seshadri High School in Nungambakkam, Chennai. In 1989, he attended the Research Science Institute. He represented India at the International Mathematical Olympiad in 1991 and won a Silver Medal.

== Education ==
Soundararajan joined the University of Michigan, Ann Arbor, in 1991 for undergraduate studies, and graduated with highest honours in 1995. Soundararajan won the inaugural Morgan Prize in 1995 for his work in analytic number theory while an undergraduate at the University of Michigan, where he later served as professor. He joined Princeton University in 1995 and did his Ph.D under the guidance of Professor Peter Sarnak.

== Career ==
After his Ph.D. he received the first five-year fellowship from the American Institute of Mathematics, and held positions at Princeton University, the Institute for Advanced Study, and the University of Michigan. He moved to Stanford University in 2006 where he is, as of November 2022, the Anne T. and Robert M. Bass Professor of Mathematics.

He provided a proof of a conjecture of Ron Graham in combinatorial number theory jointly with Ramachandran Balasubramanian. He made contributions in settling the arithmetic Quantum Unique Ergodicity conjecture for Maass wave forms and modular forms.

== Awards ==
He received the Salem Prize in 2003 "for contributions to the area of Dirichlet L-functions and related character sums". In 2005, he won the $10,000 SASTRA Ramanujan Prize, shared with Manjul Bhargava, awarded by SASTRA in Thanjavur, India, for his outstanding contributions to number theory. In 2011, he was awarded the Infosys science foundation prize. He was awarded the Ostrowski prize in 2011, shared with Ib Madsen and David Preiss, for a cornucopia of fundamental results in the last five years to go along with his earlier work.

He gave an invited talk at the International Congress of Mathematicians in 2010, on the topic of "Number Theory". In July 2017, Soundararajan was a plenary lecturer in the Mathematical Congress of the Americas. He was elected to the 2018 class of fellows of the American Mathematical Society. Kannan Soundararajan was invited as a plenary speaker of the 2022 International Congress of Mathematicians, scheduled to take place in Saint Petersburg, but moved to Helsinki and online because of the 2022 Russian invasion of Ukraine.

== Selected publications ==
- R. Holowinsky and K. Soundararajan, "Mass equidistribution for Hecke eigenforms," arXiv:0809.1636v1
- K. Soundararajan, "Nonvanishing of quadratic Dirichlet L-functions at s=1/2" arXiv:math/9902163v2
- K. Soundararajan, "Moments of the Riemann zeta function" https://annals.math.princeton.edu/wp-content/uploads/annals-v170-n2-p17-p.pdf
