= Vera Traub =

German applied mathematician and theoretical computer scientist

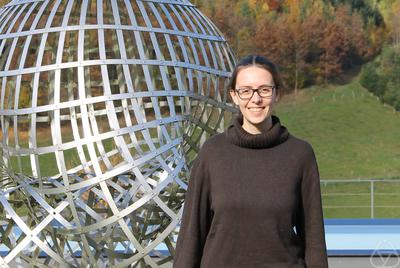
Traub in Oberwolfach in 2021

Vera Traub is a German applied mathematician and theoretical computer scientist known for her research on approximation algorithms for combinatorial optimization problems including the travelling salesperson problem and the Steiner tree problem. She is an associate professor at the Department of Computer Science at ETH Zurich.

== Education and career ==
Traub earned a bachelor's degree at the University of Bonn in 2015. She completed her doctorate (Dr. rer. nat.) there in 2020, with the dissertation Approximation Algorithms for Traveling Salesman Problems supervised by Jens Vygen. From 2020 to 2022, she was a postdoctoral researcher for Rico Zenklusen at ETH Zurich, before taking a position as a professor at the Research Institute for Discrete Mathematics at the University of Bonn. She joined ETH Zurich in 2025 as an associate professor at the Department of Computer Science, where, among other subjects, she teaches the course "Algorithms and Probabilities".

== Recognition ==
Traub was a recipient of the 2020 European Association for Theoretical Computer Science Distinguished Dissertation Award, and the Hausdorff Memorial Prize for best dissertation of the University of Bonn Mathematics Department. In 2022 she received the Richard Rado Prize of the Discrete Mathematics group of the German Mathematical Society, a biennial prize for outstanding dissertations.

She was one of three recipients of the 2023 Maryam Mirzakhani New Frontiers Prize, given to her "for advances in approximation results in classical combinatorial optimization problems, including the traveling salesman problem and network design". She also received the 2023 Heinz Maier-Leibnitz Prize of the German Research Foundation, the foundation's "most important award for researchers in early career stages".
