= Roman Holowinsky =

American mathematician

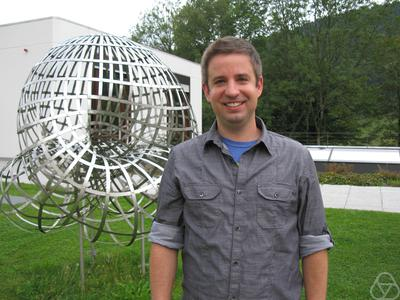
- Born: July 26, 1979 (age 47)
- Education: Rutgers University
- Awards: SASTRA Ramanujan Prize (2011)
- Scientific career
- Fields: Mathematics
- Workplaces: Ohio State University
- Doctoral advisor: Henryk Iwaniec

Roman Holowinsky (born July 26, 1979) is an American mathematician known for his work in number theory and, in particular, the theory of modular forms. He is currently an associate professor with tenure at the Ohio State University.

Holowinsky was awarded the SASTRA Ramanujan Prize in 2011 for his contributions to "areas of mathematics influenced by the genius Srinivasa Ramanujan", for proving, with Kannan Soundararajan, an important case of the quantum unique ergodicity (QUE) conjecture. In 2011, Holowinsky was also awarded a Sloan Fellowship.

Holowinsky received a Bachelors in Science Degree from Rutgers University in 2001. Afterwards, he continued his studies at Rutgers and received his PhD in 2006 under the direction of Henryk Iwaniec.

In 2017, he founded the Erdős Institute, a multi-university collaboration focused on helping graduate students, postdocs, and graduate alumni find rewarding jobs in industry.
