= Wilhelm Schlag =

Austrian American mathematician (born 1969)

Wilhelm Schlag (born May 2, 1969) is a mathematician and Phillips Professor of Mathematics at Yale University. He is known for his work in harmonic analysis and partial differential equations.

== Career ==
Schlag obtained his PhD at the California Institute of Technology in 1996 under the supervision of Thomas Wolff. Since then, he has held positions at Princeton University, California Institute of Technology and the University of Chicago where he was H. J. Livingston Professor of Mathematics before moving to Yale University in 2018. He has done extensive work in Fourier Analysis, Spectral theory and dispersive partial differential equations. Schlag is one of the managing editors of Inventiones Mathematicae.

== Awards and honors ==
- Sloan Research Fellow, 2001
- Guggenheim Fellow, 2009
- Invited Speaker, International Congress of Mathematicians, 2014
