= Chiu-Chu Melissa Liu =

Taiwanese mathematician

- 劉秋菊
- Born: 15 December 1974 (age 51); Taiwan
- Education: National Taiwan University (BS); Harvard University (PhD)
- Awards: Morningside Silver Medal (2007)
- Scientific career
- Fields: Mathematics
- Workplaces: Harvard University; Northwestern University; Columbia University
- Thesis: Moduli of J-holomorphic curves with Lagrangian boundary conditions (2002)
- Doctoral advisor: Shing-Tung Yau

Chinese name
- Traditional Chinese: 劉秋菊
- Simplified Chinese: 刘秋菊
Transcriptions
Standard Mandarin
- Hanyu Pinyin: Liú Qiūjú
- Bopomofo: ㄌㄧㄡˊ ㄑㄧㄡ ㄐㄩˊ
- Wade–Giles: Liu Ch'iu-chü

Chiu-Chu Melissa Liu (Chinese: 劉秋菊; pinyin: Liú Qiūjú; born 15 December 1974) is a Taiwanese mathematician. She is a professor of mathematics at Columbia University. Her research interests include algebraic geometry and symplectic geometry.

== Early life and education ==
Liu was born on December 16, 1974, in Taiwan. She graduated from National Taiwan University with her Bachelor of Science (B.S.) in mathematics in 1996 and earned her Ph.D. in mathematics from Harvard University in 2002 under the supervision of Shing-Tung Yau.

== Career ==
After continuing at Harvard as a Junior Fellow, she took a faculty position at Northwestern University, and moved to Columbia in 2006.

Liu won the Morningside Silver Medal in 2007. She was an invited speaker at the International Congress of Mathematicians in 2010. In 2012, she became one of the inaugural fellows of the American Mathematical Society.
