= Jacob Tsimerman =

Canadian mathematician (born 1988)

Jacob Tsimerman FRS
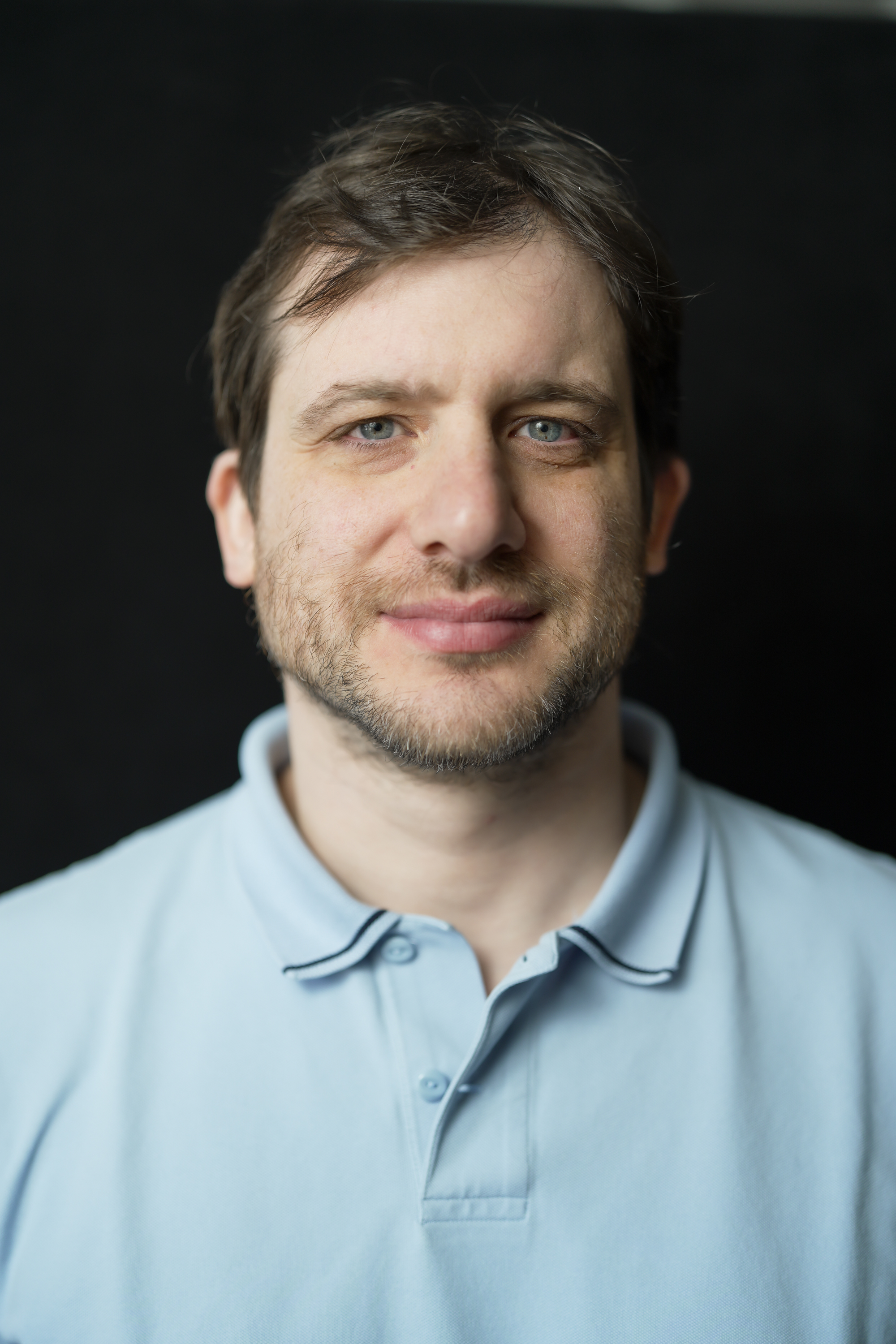
- Tsimerman in 2026
- Born: April 26, 1988 (age 38); Kazan, Tatar ASSR, Soviet Union (now Russia)
- Education: University of Toronto (BSc); Princeton University (PhD)
- Awards: Fields Medal (2026); Ostrowski Prize (2023); New Horizons in Mathematics Prize (2022); Coxeter-James Prize (2019); Aisenstadt Prize (2017); Ribenboim Prize (2016); SASTRA Ramanujan Prize (2015)
- Scientific career
- Fields: Mathematics
- Workplaces: University of Toronto
- Thesis: Towards an unconditional proof of the André-Oort Conjecture and surrounding problems (2011)
- Doctoral advisor: Peter Sarnak

Jacob Tsimerman (Note: Russian: Яков Цимерман, romanized: Yakov Tsimerman, Hebrew: ג'ייקוב צימרמן, romanized: Jakov Tzimarman) (born April 26, 1988) is a Canadian mathematician at the University of Toronto specialising in arithmetic geometry, algebraic geometry, and related areas. He was awarded the SASTRA Ramanujan Prize in the year 2015 in recognition for his work on the André–Oort conjecture and for his work in both analytic number theory and algebraic geometry. In 2026, he received the Fields Medal for his work on O-minimality, Griffiths' conjecture, and the André–Oort conjecture.

== Early life and education ==
Tsimerman was born on April 26, 1988 in Kazan, Soviet Union. In 1990, his family moved to Israel and then in 1996 to Canada. He attended the University of Toronto Schools for high school, where he represented Canada in the International Mathematical Olympiad in 2003 and 2004, winning gold medals both times with a perfect score in 2004.

Tsimerman began his post-secondary studies at University College, University of Toronto, at the age of 16, where he graduated after two years in 2006 with a bachelor's degree in mathematics. He obtained his PhD from Princeton in 2011 under the guidance of Peter Sarnak.

== Career ==
Following his PhD, he had a postdoctoral position at Harvard University as a Junior Fellow of the Harvard Society of Fellows. In July 2014, he was awarded a Sloan Fellowship, and he started his term as assistant professor in the Department of Mathematics at the University of Toronto, where he is now a full professor.

In 2018, Tsimerman was an invited speaker at the International Congress of Mathematicians (ICM). In 2019, he was awarded the Coxeter–James Prize by the Canadian Mathematical Society. He is also one of winners of the 2022 New Horizons in Mathematics Prize, associated with the Breakthrough Prize in Mathematics. He was awarded for "outstanding work in analytic number theory and arithmetic geometry, including breakthroughs on the André-Oort and Griffiths conjectures". In 2023, Tsimerman received the Ostrowski Prize. In 2024, he was awarded the John L. Synge Award from the Royal Society of Canada. He was elected a Fellow of the Royal Society in 2025. Between 2025 and 2026, Tsimerman was a visiting professor at the Institute for Advanced Study.

In 2026, Tsimerman was awarded the Fields Medal at ICM Philadelphia 2026 for his "contribution in the recasting of o-minimality as a fundamental method of arithmetic and complex algebraic geometry, and his role in the proof of many central conjectures including Griffiths' conjecture on the algebraicity of images of the period maps, and the André-Oort conjecture for Siegel modular varieties." He became the first faculty member at a Canadian university to win the Fields Medal. There, he announced he was joining OpenAI as a researcher in AI safety.

In September 2026, Tsimerman announced the creation of the Mathematical AI Safety Institute (MAISI), an independent research institution.

== Research ==
Together with Jonathan Pila, Tsimerman demonstrated the André–Oort conjecture for Siegel modular varieties. Later, he completed the proof of the André–Oort conjecture for the Shimura variety by reducing the problem to the averaged Colmez conjecture which was proved by Xinyi Yuan and Shou-Wu Zhang as well as independently by Andreatta, Goren, Howard and Madapusi-Pera. In 2021, Tsimerman, Pila and Ananth Shankar published a full proof of the André–Oort conjecture.
