= Zhouping Xin =

Zhouping Xin (Chinese: 辛周平; born 13 July 1959) is a Chinese mathematician and the William M.W. Mong Professor of Mathematics at the Chinese University of Hong Kong. He specializes in partial differential equations.

== Education and career ==
Xin received his Ph.D. in mathematics from the University of Michigan, Ann Arbor in 1988, under the supervision of Joel Smoller. Before joining the faculty of the Chinese University of Hong Kong, he was a professor at the Courant Institute at New York University. He was a Sloan Research Fellow from 1991 to 1993 and an invited speaker at the 2002 International Congress of Mathematicians. He has also been affiliated with the Institute of Advanced Study at Princeton.

In 2004, Xin was awarded the Morningside Gold Medal of Mathematics for his work in nonlinear PDEs. Specifically, the award citation cites his proof of "the global existence of solutions of the Prandtl equations" and his "new mathematical framework for the study of transonic shockwave flow in a nozzle."
