= He County =

Hexian 和县
- County
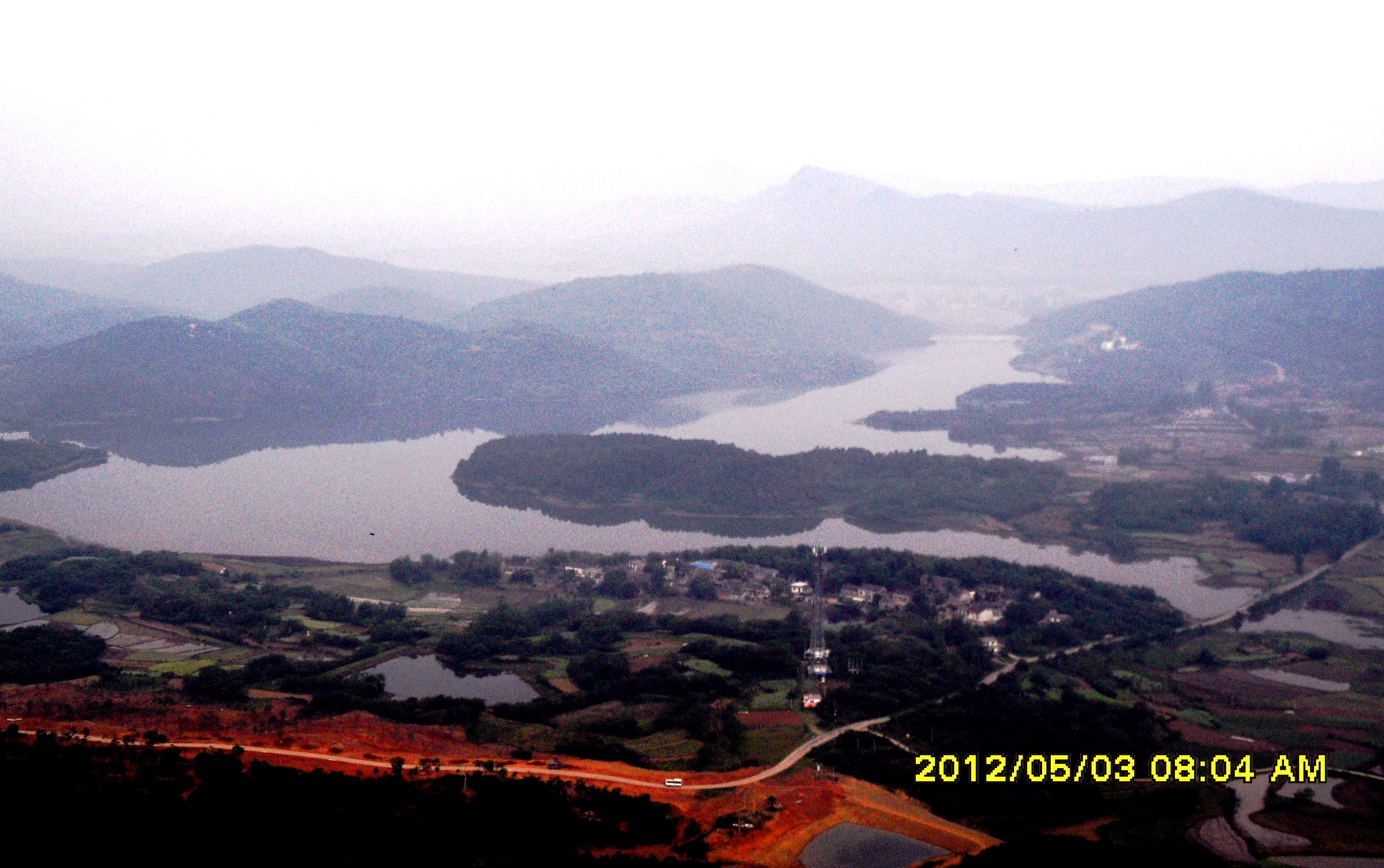

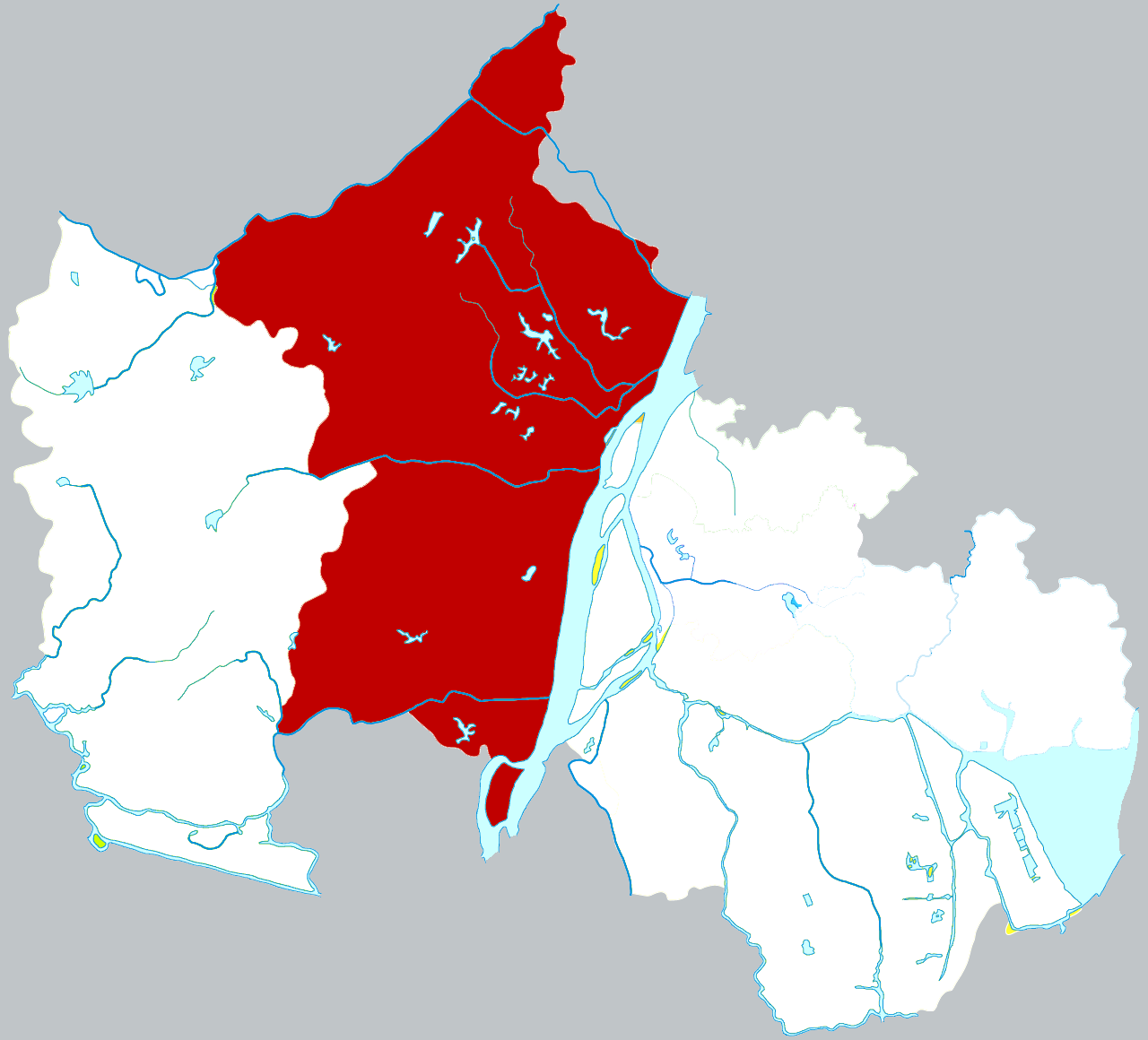
- Hexian in Ma'anshan
- Coordinates: 31.74°N 118.35°E
- Country: China
- Province: Anhui
- Prefecture-level city: Ma'anshan
- Established: August 2011
- County seat: Liyang

Area
  - Total: 1,319 km^{2} (509 sq mi)

Population (2020)
  - Total: 410,899
  - Density: 311.5/km^{2} (806.8/sq mi)
- Time zone: UTC+8 (China Standard Time)
- Postal Code: 238200
- Website: http://www.hx.gov.cn/

He County or Hexian (simplified Chinese: 和县; traditional Chinese: 和縣; pinyin: Hé Xiàn) is a county in the east of Anhui Province, China, under the jurisdiction of Ma'anshan. It has a population of 650,000 and an area of 1,412 square kilometres (545 mi^{2}). The government of He County is located in Liyang Town.

== History ==
From 1965 to 2011, He County was under the jurisdiction of Chaohu. On August 22, 2011, the Anhui provincial government reorganized the province and split Chaohu into three parts that were absorbed by neighboring prefecture-level cities.

== Geography ==
He County is located on the northern bank of the Yangtze River. He County borders Chuzhou to the northwest, Nanjing to the northeast, the three urban districts of Ma'anshan to the east, Wuhu to the south, and Hanshan County to the west.

He County has a total area of 1318.6 square kilometers (509 sq mi), of which 48% is arable land. He County is situated on the Yangtze Plain and has relatively flat terrain in the southeast, with ponds dotting the alluvial plains, with the northwest of the county consisting of rolling hills.

== Climate ==
Climate data for Hexian, elevation 23 m (75 ft), (1991–2020 normals, extremes 1981–present)
Month	Jan	Feb	Mar	Apr	May	Jun	Jul	Aug	Sep	Oct	Nov	Dec	Year
Record high °C (°F)	21.9 (71.4)	28.3 (82.9)	33.4 (92.1)	33.8 (92.8)	35.6 (96.1)	38.0 (100.4)	38.7 (101.7)	39.4 (102.9)	38.0 (100.4)	34.4 (93.9)	28.7 (83.7)	22.1 (71.8)	39.4 (102.9)
Mean daily maximum °C (°F)	7.4 (45.3)	10.2 (50.4)	15.3 (59.5)	21.7 (71.1)	26.9 (80.4)	29.6 (85.3)	32.7 (90.9)	32.2 (90.0)	28.2 (82.8)	23.0 (73.4)	16.6 (61.9)	10.0 (50.0)	21.2 (70.1)
Daily mean °C (°F)	3.5 (38.3)	5.9 (42.6)	10.5 (50.9)	16.7 (62.1)	22.1 (71.8)	25.4 (77.7)	28.8 (83.8)	28.1 (82.6)	23.8 (74.8)	18.3 (64.9)	11.9 (53.4)	5.7 (42.3)	16.7 (62.1)
Mean daily minimum °C (°F)	0.4 (32.7)	2.5 (36.5)	6.7 (44.1)	12.3 (54.1)	17.8 (64.0)	22.0 (71.6)	25.6 (78.1)	25.0 (77.0)	20.5 (68.9)	14.6 (58.3)	8.3 (46.9)	2.4 (36.3)	13.2 (55.7)
Record low °C (°F)	−9.2 (15.4)	−10.4 (13.3)	−4.4 (24.1)	1.1 (34.0)	8.5 (47.3)	12.6 (54.7)	18.6 (65.5)	16.5 (61.7)	12.4 (54.3)	3.1 (37.6)	−4.5 (23.9)	−11.8 (10.8)	−11.8 (10.8)
Average precipitation mm (inches)	53.9 (2.12)	61.0 (2.40)	84.9 (3.34)	90.1 (3.55)	87.1 (3.43)	189.2 (7.45)	197.2 (7.76)	154.9 (6.10)	71.5 (2.81)	53.3 (2.10)	56.0 (2.20)	36.6 (1.44)	1,135.7 (44.7)
Average precipitation days (≥ 0.1 mm)	10.3	9.7	11.4	10.2	10.4	10.7	11.8	12.2	8.2	8.1	8.2	7.8	119
Average snowy days	3.7	2.2	0.7	0	0	0	0	0	0	0	0.4	1.2	8.2
Average relative humidity (%)	73	72	71	69	70	76	78	79	77	73	73	71	74
Mean monthly sunshine hours	112.8	112.6	163.2	184.9	193.1	161.5	202.6	194.9	156.5	157.7	139.9	129.6	1,909.3
Percentage possible sunshine	35	36	44	47	45	38	47	48	43	45	45	42	43
Source: China Meteorological Administration all-time January high

== Administrative divisions ==
He County has jurisdiction to 9 towns. Its 1 former town and 4 former townships were merged to other towns.

9 Towns

- Liyang (历阳镇)
- Baiqiao (白桥镇)
- Laoqiao (姥桥镇)
- Gongqiao (功桥镇)
- Xibu (西埠镇)
- Xiangquan (香泉镇)
- Wujiang (乌江镇)
- Shanhou (善厚镇)
- Shiyang (石杨镇)

== Archaeology ==
Hexian
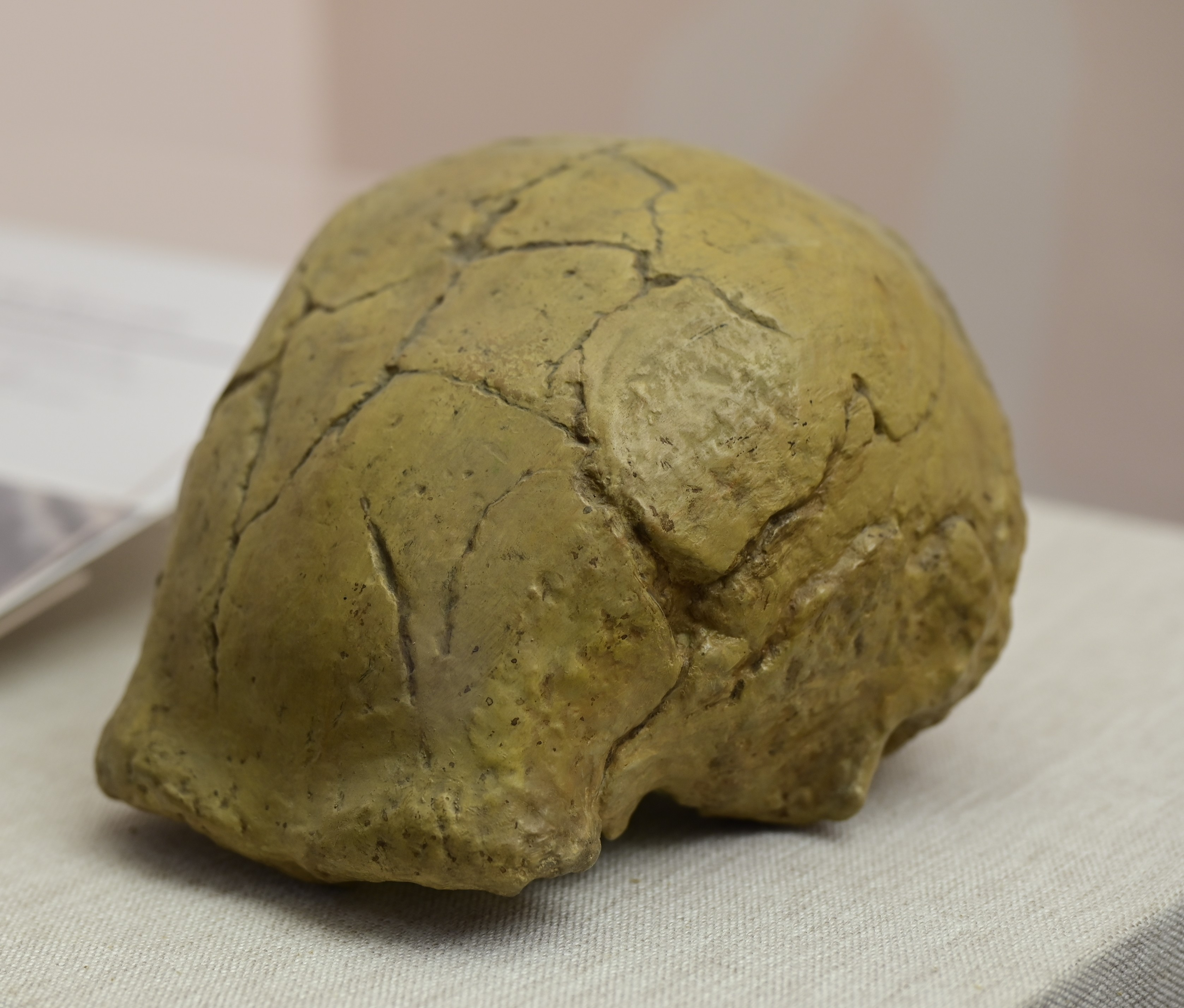
- Skull cast, Paleozoological Museum of China
- Catalog no.: PA830-PA835; PA 840-PA841
- Common name: Hexian
- Species: Homo erectus
- Age: 412±25 ka
- Place discovered: China
- Date discovered: 1980, May-June 1981
- Discovered by: IVPP team

The human remains discovered at Hexian includes a vault, cranial fragments, mandibular, and dental elements catalogued as PA830-PA835 and PA840-PA845. The site containing hominin material was excavated in 1980 and May through June 1981 by IVPP teams alongside many other transitional mammalian fossils in layer 4 of Longtan Cave. Cui and Wu (2015) suggest that although the site is around 400 ka, better dating will be required. It was once called Homo erectus hexianensis, but other studies suggest that the differences in the specimen are not differentiating on the subspecies-level.

=== Cranium ===
The skull (PA830) was discovered in several fragments lacking most of the basicranium. In 1982, the endocast was reconstructed and the cranial capacity was measured to be 1025. The frontal and temporal lobes are almost complete, while the parietal and occipital lobes are complete. Otherwise, the exterior specimen is very well preserved. During the 1981 excavations, a right supraorbital torus and parietal were reported. The thickness, profile, brow, and distinct nuchal-occipital boundary are like Chinese Homo erectus. However, a lack of postorbital constriction, increased width, a curved sagittal profile, a long parietal, and a high temporal are unlike these groups. Aside from the vault, two parietals, PA840 and PA841, are known.

=== Mandible ===
The dental-mandibular remains were discovered in 1980 alongside the vault in excavation pit 3C. The mandible is PA831, and four isolated teeth are PA832, PA833, PA834-1, and PA834-2; PA835 is another tooth. 831 is a mandible with M2 and M3 in place, with a P3-P4 septum remaining in place. The mandible is thought to belong to a young adult individual, but sex estimation is not possible. The mandibular body was robust, and a well-differentiated mylohyoid line and a posteriorly-positioned lateral prominence are derived traits. Overall, the mandible has no Neanderthal traits, but is quite similar to Homo antecessor. The teeth are characteristic of Homo erectus.

=== Classification ===
Liu et al. (2017) suggest that the Hexian hominins either belong to the same robust-jawed paleodeme as the Penghu hominin, or a robust morph of mainland Homo erectus. Overall, the morph displays primitive traits that are roughly contemporaneous with the hominins at Zhoukoudian. Wu et al. (2006) suggest that the differences are on account of local variation rather than subspecies-level differences, and that the Zhoukoudian sample is not representative of the taxon's full diversity. In comparison with Zhoukoudian, the Hexian crania are derived in the frontal and posterior regions, but derived towards Indonesian populations in the lateral region. Cui and Wu (2015) suggest that these are either retentions or gene flow between regions.

== Notable people ==
- Zhang Ji, Tang dynasty poet and author
- Jackie Chan, actor and martial artist (ancestry)
- Xu Haifeng, first Chinese gold Olympic medal winner
- Shou-Wu Zhang, mathematician
