= Adam Harper =

Mathematician

Adam J Harper
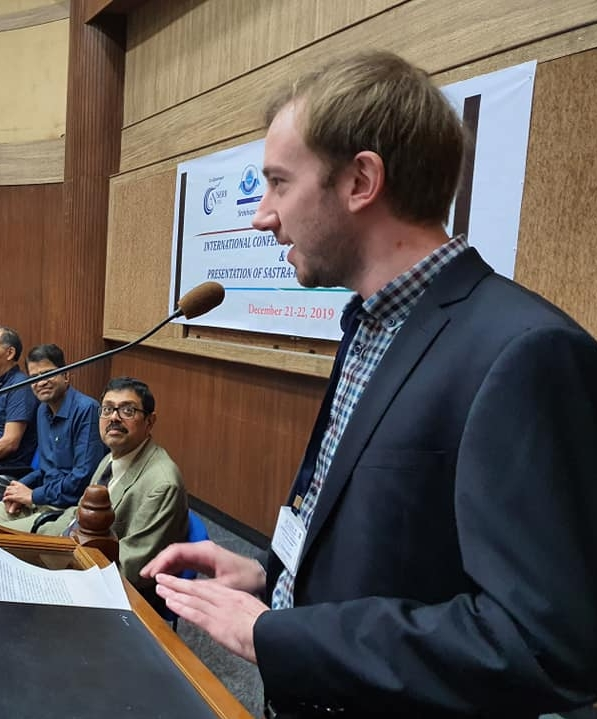
- Adam Harper in 2019
- Born: Lowestoft, England
- Education: Exeter College (MMath); University of Cambridge (PhD)
- Awards: SASTRA Ramanujan Prize (2019); Whitehead Prize (2020)
- Scientific career
- Fields: Mathematics
- Workplaces: University of Warwick
- Doctoral advisor: Ben Green

Adam Harper is a mathematician specialising in number theory, particularly in analytic, combinatorial and probabilistic number theory. He is currently a professor at the University of Warwick, England. Harper was awarded the SASTRA Ramanujan Prize in 2019 "for several outstanding contributions to analytic and probabilistic number theory."

"Harper's research, both individually and in collaboration, covers the theory of the Riemann zeta function, random multiplicative functions, S-unit equations, smooth numbers, the large sieve, and the recent highly innovative "pretentious" approach to number theory. In establishing these results, he has shown mastery over probabilistic methods which he has used with remarkable effect in analytic number theory."

== Academic career ==
Adam Harper was born in Lowestoft in the United Kingdom. He did a four-year MMath course at Exeter College, Oxford and won the Oxford Junior Mathematics Prize. He completed his PhD in 2012 at Cambridge University under the guidance of Professor Ben Green, and as a PhD student won the Smith Essay Prize. He was a postdoctoral fellow with Professor Andrew Granville at CRM Montréal during 2012–2013, following which he was a research fellow at Jesus College, Cambridge during 2013–16. He returned to Montréal in 2018 as Simons CRM Visiting Professor. He is currently a professor at the University of Warwick.

== Other awards ==
Adam Harper was awarded a Whitehead Prize in 2020 for "his deep and important contributions to analytic number theory, and in particular for his work on the value distribution of the Riemann zeta function and random multiplicative functions using sophisticated ideas and techniques from probability theory."
