= Winnie Li =

Taiwanese-American mathematician

Wen-Ch'ing Li
- 李文卿
- Born: December 25, 1948 (age 77)
- Education: National Taiwan University (BS); University of California, Berkeley (PhD)
- Awards: Chern Prize (2010); Fellow, American Mathematical Society (2012); Noether Lecture (2015)
- Scientific career
- Fields: Mathematics
- Workplaces: Harvard University; University of Illinois at Chicago; Pennsylvania State University
- Thesis: New Forms and Functional Equations (1974)
- Doctoral advisor: Andrew Ogg

Wen-Ch'ing (Winnie) Li (Chinese: 李文卿; born December 25, 1948) is a Taiwanese-American mathematician and a Distinguished Professor of Mathematics at Pennsylvania State University. She is a number theorist, with research focusing on the theory of automorphic forms and applications of number theory to coding theory and spectral graph theory. In particular, she has applied her research results in automorphic forms and number theory to construct efficient communication networks called Ramanujan graphs and Ramanujan complexes.

== Early life ==
Li's father was a chemist who moved from mainland China to Taiwan in 1946 to help run a salt company. Li's mother arrived in Taiwan the following year. An only child, Li grew up in the city of Tainan.

== Professional career ==
Li graduated from National Taiwan University with a Bachelor of Science in mathematics in 1970. As an undergraduate, she was a classmate of mathematicians Fan Chung, Sun-Yung Alice Chang and Jang-Mei Wu. She then earned her Ph.D. in mathematics from the University of California, Berkeley, in 1974, under the supervision of Andrew Ogg.

Before joining faculty of Pennsylvania State University in 1979, she was a Benjamin Pierce assistant professor at Harvard University for 3.5 years from 1974 to 1977, and a tenure-track assistant professor at the University of Illinois at Chicago from 1978 to 1979. She was also the director of the National Center of Theoretical Sciences in Taiwan from 2009 to 2014.

== Awards and honors ==
In 2010, Li was the winner of the Chern Prize, given every three years to an outstanding Chinese mathematician. In 2012 she became a fellow of the American Mathematical Society. She was chosen to give the 2015 Noether Lecture.
