= Alexander Smith (mathematician) =

American mathematician

Alexander Smith is an American mathematician and (since 2025) assistant professor at Northwestern University. Specializing in number theory, Smith is renowned in particular for his work on arithmetic statistics.

Smith was an undergraduate student at Princeton University and he received his doctorate degree in 2020 from Harvard University under the supervision of Noam Elkies and Mark Kisin. Beginning in 2021, he was a postdoctoral Clay Research Fellow at Stanford and UCLA. In 2019, Smith won the inaugural David Goss Prize, and in October 2025, it was announced that he is to be awarded the 2025 SASTRA Ramanujan Prize.
