= Angkana Rüland =

German mathematician

Angkana Rüland (born 1987) is a German applied mathematician, a professor in mathematics and holder of a Hausdorff Chair in mathematics at the Hausdorff Center for Mathematics of the University of Bonn. Her research has included work on the mathematical modeling of shape-memory alloys and on the inverse problems arising in animal echolocation.

== Education and career ==
Rüland was born in 1987 in Chiang Mai, but is a German citizen. She grew up in Bonn and was a mathematics student at the University of Bonn. She completed her doctorate in 2014 with the dissertation On Some Rigidity Properties in PDEs supervised by Herbert Koch.

After postdoctoral research at the University of Oxford, working there with John M. Ball, she became a researcher at the Max Planck Institute for Mathematics in the Sciences in 2017. She took a professorship at Heidelberg University in 2020 before returning to the University of Bonn in 2023.

== Recognition ==
Rüland is one of the recipients of the 2024 New Horizons in Mathematics Prize, associated with the Breakthrough Prize in Mathematics, "for contributions to applied analysis, in particular the analysis of microstructure in solid-solid phase transitions and the theory of inverse problems". In 2025, she received the Gottfried Wilhelm Leibniz Prize.
