= Lexing Ying =

Applied mathematician

Lexing Ying is a professor of mathematics at Stanford University, where he is also a member of the Institute for Computational and Mathematical Engineering. He specializes in scientific computing and numerical analysis. In particular, his research concerns the design of numerical algorithms for problems in scientific computing.

Ying received his bachelor's degree in computer science and applied mathematics from Shanghai Jiaotong University in 1998. He received his Ph.D. from the Courant Institute at New York University in 2004, under the guidance of Denis Zorin. Before joining Stanford in 2012, he was a post-doc at California Institute of Technology and a professor at University of Texas, Austin.

The awards Ying has received include a Sloan Fellowship in 2007, an NSF Career Award in 2009, the James H. Wilkinson Prize in Numerical Analysis and Scientific Computing in 2013 (for "his outstanding contributions in many areas, including the rapid evaluation of oscillatory integral transforms, high frequency wave propagation and the computation of electron structure in metallic systems"), and a silver Morningside Medal in 2016. He is an invited speaker of International Congress of Mathematicians 2022. He was named as a Fellow of the American Mathematical Society, in its 2027 class of fellows.
