= Will Sawin =

Mathematician

- Born: William French Sawin; October 1993 (age 32–33); Malden, Massachusetts, United States
- Education: Princeton University; Yale University
- Awards: Sloan Fellowship (2023); SASTRA Ramanujan Prize (2021)
- Scientific career
- Fields: Mathematics
- Workplaces: Princeton University; Columbia University; ETH Zürich
- Thesis: A Tannakian Category and a Horizontal Equidistribution Conjecture for Exponential Sums (2016)
- Doctoral advisor: Nick Katz

William French Sawin (born in October 1993) is the Fernholz Professor of Mathematics at Princeton University specialising in number theory and algebraic geometry.

== Early life and education ==
Will Sawin was born in Malden, Massachusetts in October 1993. He was a child prodigy and began his undergraduate studies at Yale University when he was 10 years old. He also attended Fairfield Ludlowe High School at the same time. He received both his high school diploma and his BSc degree in mathematics and economics from Yale University in 2011.

He earned his PhD degree from Princeton University in 2016 on "A Tannakian Category and a Horizontal Equidistribution Conjecture for Exponential Sums" under the supervision of Nick Katz.

== Career ==
Sawin was a postdoctoral junior fellow at ETH Zürich from 2016 to 2018. He joined the faculty at Columbia University as an assistant professor in 2018 and was promoted to associate professor in 2023. He moved to Princeton University as a professor of mathematics in 2024.

== Research ==
Sawin found important applications of étale cohomology to the theory of exponential sums over finite fields. He also uses classical counting techniques in analytic number theory in the study of cohomology of spaces that are of interest in algebraic geometry.

== Awards and honors ==
Sawin held a Clay Research Fellowship from the Clay Mathematics Institute from 2018 to 2021. He was awarded the SASTRA Ramanujan Prize in 2021. In 2023, Sawin was awarded a Sloan Fellowship.
