= Xu-Jia Wang =

Chinese-Australian mathematician

Wang Xu-Jia
- 汪徐家
- Born: September 1963 (age 63); Chun'an County, Zhejiang, China
- Education: Zhejiang University (BS, PhD)
- Awards: Australian Mathematical Society Medal (2002); Morningside Medal (2007)
- Scientific career
- Fields: Mathematics
- Workplaces: Zhejiang University; Australian National University; Westlake University
- Thesis: Existence of Multiple Solutions of Boundary Value Problems of Nonlinear Elliptic Equations
- Doctoral advisor: Dong Guangchang

Xu-Jia Wang (Chinese: 汪徐家; pinyin: Wāng Xújiā; born September 1963) is a Chinese-Australian mathematician. He is a professor of mathematics at the Australian National University and a fellow of the Australian Academy of Science. He joined Westlake University in Hangzhou, China, in September 2024 as a full-time Chair Professor of Mathematics.

== Biography ==
Wang was born in Chun'an County, Zhejiang. He earned his Bachelor of Science in mathematics in 1983 and his Ph.D. in mathematics in 1990 from Zhejiang University.

After completing his PhD, Wang served as lecturer and associate professor, at ZJU before departing for ANU In 1995. Wang was a research fellow until 2005, becoming a Professor in the Centre for Mathematics and its Applications and Mathematical Sciences Institute of Australian National University.

Wang is well known for his work on differential equations, especially non-linear partial differential equations and their geometrical and transportational applications.

== Honors and awards ==
- Australian Mathematical Society Medal (2002)
- invited speaker, 2002 International Congress of Mathematicians
- Morningside Gold Medal of Mathematics, 2007
- Fellow of the Australian Academy of Science (2009).
- Australian Laureate Fellowship (2013)

== Publications (selected) ==
- Wang, Xu-Jia (2011). "Convex solutions to the mean curvature flow". Annals of Mathematics. 173 (3): 1185–1239. arXiv:math/0404326. doi:10.4007/annals.2011.173.3.1.
- (with Aram Karakhanyan) Karakhanyan, Aram; Wang, Xu-Jia (2010). "On the reflector shape design". Journal of Differential Geometry. 84 (3): 561–610. doi:10.4310/jdg/1279114301.
- (with Guji Tian) Tian, Gu-Ji; Wang, Xu-Jia (2010). "Moser-Trudinger type inequalities for the Hessian equation". Journal of Functional Analysis. 259 (8): 1974–2002. doi:10.1016/j.jfa.2010.06.009.
  - See also: Hessian equation
- (with Kai-Seng Chou) Chou, Kai-Seng; Wang, Xu-Jia (2006). "The Lp-Minkowski problem and the Minkowski problem in centroaffine geometry". Advances in Mathematics. 205 (1): 33–83. doi:10.1016/j.aim.2005.07.004. hdl:1885/28586.
- Wang, Xu-Jia (2006). "Schauder estimates for elliptic and parabolic equations". Chinese Annals of Mathematics, Series B. 27 (6): 637–642. doi:10.1007/s11401-006-0142-3. hdl:1885/28861.
- (with Neil Trudinger) Trudinger, Neil; Wang, Xu-Jia (2005). "The affine Plateau problem". Journal of the American Mathematical Society. 18 (2): 253–289. arXiv:math/0405541. doi:10.1090/S0894-0347-05-00475-3.
- (with Neil Trudinger and Xi-Nan Ma) Ma, Xi-Nan; Trudinger, Neil S.; Wang, Xu-Jia (2005). "Regularity of Potential Functions of the Optimal Transportation Problem". Archive for Rational Mechanics and Analysis. 177 (2): 151–183. Bibcode:2005ArRMA.177..151M. doi:10.1007/s00205-005-0362-9.
- (with Xiaohua Zhu) Wang, Xu-Jia; Zhu, Xiaohua (2004). "Kähler-Ricci solitons on toric manifolds with positive first Chern class". Advances in Mathematics. 188 (1): 87–103. doi:10.1016/j.aim.2003.09.009.
