= Zimmer's conjecture =

Mathematical conjecture regarding symmetries

Zimmer's conjecture is a statement in mathematics "which has to do with the circumstances under which geometric spaces exhibit certain kinds of symmetries." It was named after the mathematician Robert Zimmer. The conjecture states that there can exist symmetries (specifically higher-rank lattices) in a higher dimension that cannot exist in lower dimensions.

A proof of the conjecture was announced in 2017 and published in 2020 by Aaron Brown, Sebastián Hurtado-Salazar, and David Fisher.
