= Yifeng Liu =

Chinese professor of mathematics

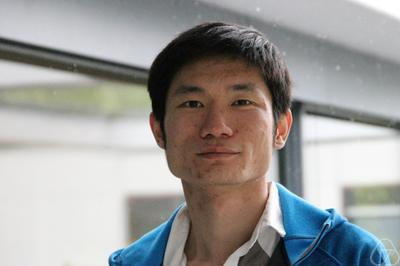
- Liu at Oberwolfach in 2014
- Born: July 19, 1985 (age 41); Shanghai, China
- Education: Peking University (BS); Columbia University (PhD)
- Awards: Sloan Research Fellowship (2017); SASTRA Ramanujan Prize (2018)
- Scientific career
- Fields: Mathematics
- Workplaces: Yale University; Northwestern University; Massachusetts Institute of Technology; Zhejiang University
- Thesis: Arithmetic inner product formula for unitary groups (2012)
- Doctoral advisor: Shou-Wu Zhang

Yifeng Liu (Chinese: 刘一峰; pinyin: Liú Yīfēng; born July 19, 1985) is a Chinese professor of mathematics at Zhejiang University specializing in number theory, automorphic forms and arithmetic geometry.

== Career ==
Liu graduated from Peking University with a Bachelor of Science in 2007 and earned his Ph.D. from Columbia University in 2012 under Shou-Wu Zhang. He was a C.L.E. Moore Instructor at MIT from 2012 to 2015 and an assistant professor at Northwestern University from 2015 to 2018 before being appointed an associate professor at Yale University. Liu returned to China in 2021 to join Zheijiang University became a full professor of mathematics.

Liu has made important contributions to arithmetic geometry and number theory. His contributions span a wide spectrum of topics such as arithmetic theta lifts and derivatives of L-functions, the Gan–Gross–Prasad conjecture and its arithmetic counterpart, the Beilinson–Bloch–Kato conjecture, the geometric Langlands program, the p-adic Waldspurger theorem, and the study of étale cohomology on Artin stacks.

== Awards ==
He received a Sloan Research Fellowship in 2017.

He was awarded the 2018 SASTRA Ramanujan Prize for his contributions to the field of mathematics. He shared the prize with Jack Thorne.
