= André–Oort conjecture =

Mathematical conjecture

In mathematics, the André–Oort conjecture is a problem in Diophantine geometry, a branch of number theory, that can be seen as a non-abelian analogue of the Manin–Mumford conjecture, which is now a theorem (proven in several different ways). The conjecture concerns itself with a characterization of the Zariski closure of sets of special points in Shimura varieties. A special case of the conjecture was stated by Yves André in 1989, and a more general statement (albeit with a restriction on the type of the Shimura variety) was conjectured by Frans Oort in 1995. The modern version is a natural generalization of these two conjectures.

== Statement ==
The conjecture in its modern form states that each irreducible component of the Zariski closure of a set of special points in a Shimura variety is a special subvariety.

André's first version of the conjecture was just for one-dimensional irreducible components, while Oort proposed that it should be true for irreducible components of arbitrary dimension in the moduli space of principally polarised Abelian varieties of dimension g. It seems that André was motivated by applications to transcendence theory while Oort by the analogy with the Manin-Mumford conjecture.

== Results ==
Various results have been established towards the full conjecture by Ben Moonen, Yves André, Andrei Yafaev, Bas Edixhoven, Laurent Clozel, Bruno Klingler, and Emmanuel Ullmo, among others. Some of these results were conditional upon the generalized Riemann hypothesis (GRH) being true. In fact, the proof of the full conjecture under GRH was published by Bruno Klingler, Emmanuel Ullmo, and Andrei Yafaev in 2014 in the Annals of Mathematics. In 2006, Umberto Zannier and Jonathan Pila used techniques from o-minimal geometry and transcendental number theory to develop an approach to the Manin–Mumford–André–Oort type of problems. In 2009, Jonathan Pila proved the André–Oort conjecture unconditionally for arbitrary products of modular curves, a result which earned him the 2011 Clay Research Award.

Bruno Klingler, Emmanuel Ullmo, and Andrei Yafaev proved, in 2014, the functional transcendence result needed for the general Pila–Zannier approach, and Emmanuel Ullmo deduced from it a technical result needed for the induction step in the strategy. The remaining technical ingredient was the problem of bounding below the Galois degrees of special points.

For the case of the Siegel modular variety, this bound was deduced by Jacob Tsimerman in 2015 from the averaged Colmez conjecture and the Masser–Wustholtz isogeny estimates. The averaged Colmez conjecture was proved by Xinyi Yuan and Shou-Wu Zhang and independently by Andreatta, Goren, Howard, and Madapusi-Pera.

In 2019–2020, Gal Biniyamini, Harry Schmidt, and Andrei Yafaev, building on previous work and ideas of Harry Schmidt on torsion points in tori and abelian varieties and Gal Biniyamini's point-counting results, formulated a conjecture on bounds of heights of special points and deduced from its validity the bounds for the Galois degrees of special points needed for the proof of the full André–Oort conjecture.

In September 2021, Jonathan Pila, Ananth Shankar, and Jacob Tsimerman claimed in a paper (featuring an appendix written by Hélène Esnault and Michael Groechenig) a proof of the Biniyamini–Schmidt–Yafaev height conjecture, thus completing the proof of the André–Oort conjecture using the Pila–Zannier strategy.

== Coleman–Oort conjecture ==
A related conjecture that has two forms, equivalent if the André–Oort conjecture is assumed, is the Coleman–Oort conjecture. Robert Coleman conjectured that for sufficiently large g, there are only finitely many smooth projective curves C of genus g, such that the Jacobian variety J(C) is an abelian variety of CM-type. Oort then conjectured that the Torelli locus – of the moduli space of abelian varieties of dimension g – has for sufficiently large g no special subvariety of dimension > 0 that intersects the image of the Torelli mapping in a dense open subset.

== Generalizations ==
The Manin–Mumford and André–Oort conjectures can be generalized in many directions, for example by relaxing the properties of points being "special" (and considering the so-called "unlikely locus" instead) or looking at more general ambient varieties: abelian or semi-abelian schemes, mixed Shimura varieties, etc. These generalizations are colloquially known as the Zilber–Pink conjectures because problems of this type were proposed by Richard Pink and Boris Zilber. Most of these questions are open and are a subject of current active research.

== See also ==
- Zilber–Pink conjecture
