= Jonathan Pila =

Australian mathematician (born 1962)

Jonathan Pila FRS
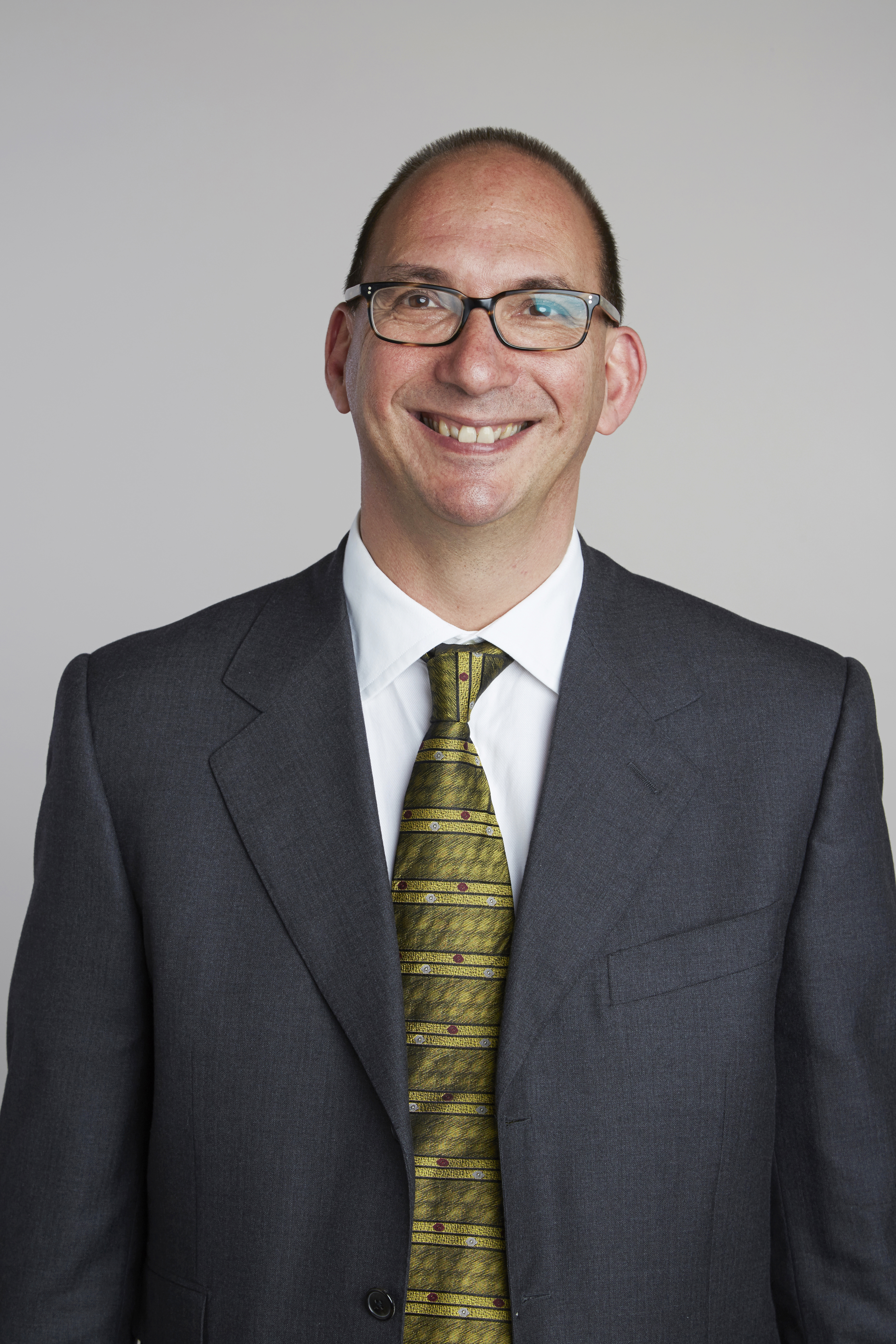
- Jonathan Pila in 2015, portrait from the Royal Society
- Born: Jonathan Solomon Pila; 28 July 1962 (age 64); Melbourne, Australia
- Education: University of Melbourne; Stanford University (PhD)
- Awards: FRS (2015); Clay Research Award (2011); Rolf Schock Prize (2022)
- Scientific career
- Workplaces: University of Oxford
- Thesis: Frobenius maps of Abelian varieties and finding roots of unity in finite fields (1988)
- Doctoral advisor: Peter Sarnak
- Website: www.maths.ox.ac.uk/people/jonathan.pila

Jonathan Solomon Pila (born 1962) is an Australian mathematician at the University of Oxford. He was awarded a BSc from the University of Melbourne in 1984, and a PhD from Stanford University in 1988, the latter for research supervised by Peter Sarnak. His dissertation was entitled "Frobenius Maps of Abelian Varieties and Finding Roots of Unity in Finite Fields". In 2010, he received an MA from Oxford.

== Career and research ==
Research interests lie in number theory and model theory. A focus has been applying the theory of o-minimality to Diophantine problems. This work began with an early paper with Enrico Bombieri, and developed through collaborations with Alex Wilkie and Umberto Zannier. The techniques obtained have led to advances in Diophantine problems, including Pila's unconditional proof of the André–Oort conjecture for powers of the modular curve. Work by Pila and Jacob Tsimerman, demonstrated the André–Oort conjecture in the case of the Siegel modular variety.

Pila has held posts at Columbia University, McGill University, the University of Bristol and (as a visiting member) the Institute for Advanced Study. Pila also took a substantial break from professional mathematics to work in his family's manufacturing business.

Pila has been the Editor of Proceedings of the Edinburgh Mathematical Society, and of Algebra and Number Theory.

== Awards and honours ==
Pila was awarded a Clay Research Award for his work on the Andre-Oort conjecture in 2011. In June 2011, he was awarded the Senior Whitehead Prize by the London Mathematical Society. This prize is "awarded in recognition of work in and influence on and service to mathematics; or lecturing gifts." Specifically, the citation recognized "his startling recent work on the Andre-Oort and Manin-Mumford conjectures. The approach he and his collaborators have developed, which combines analytic ideas with model theory, is entirely new and shows great promise for further applications."

In addition to the Clay and London Mathematical Society awards, Pila delivered the Arf Lecture in 2011, was awarded the Leverhulme Trust Research Fellowship 2008–2010. and received the Karp Prize in 2013. Pila was elected a Fellow of the Royal Society (FRS) in 2015. In 2022, he received the Rolf Schock Prize in the category of "Mathematics".
