= Xinyi Yuan =

Chinese mathematician (born 1981)

- 袁新意
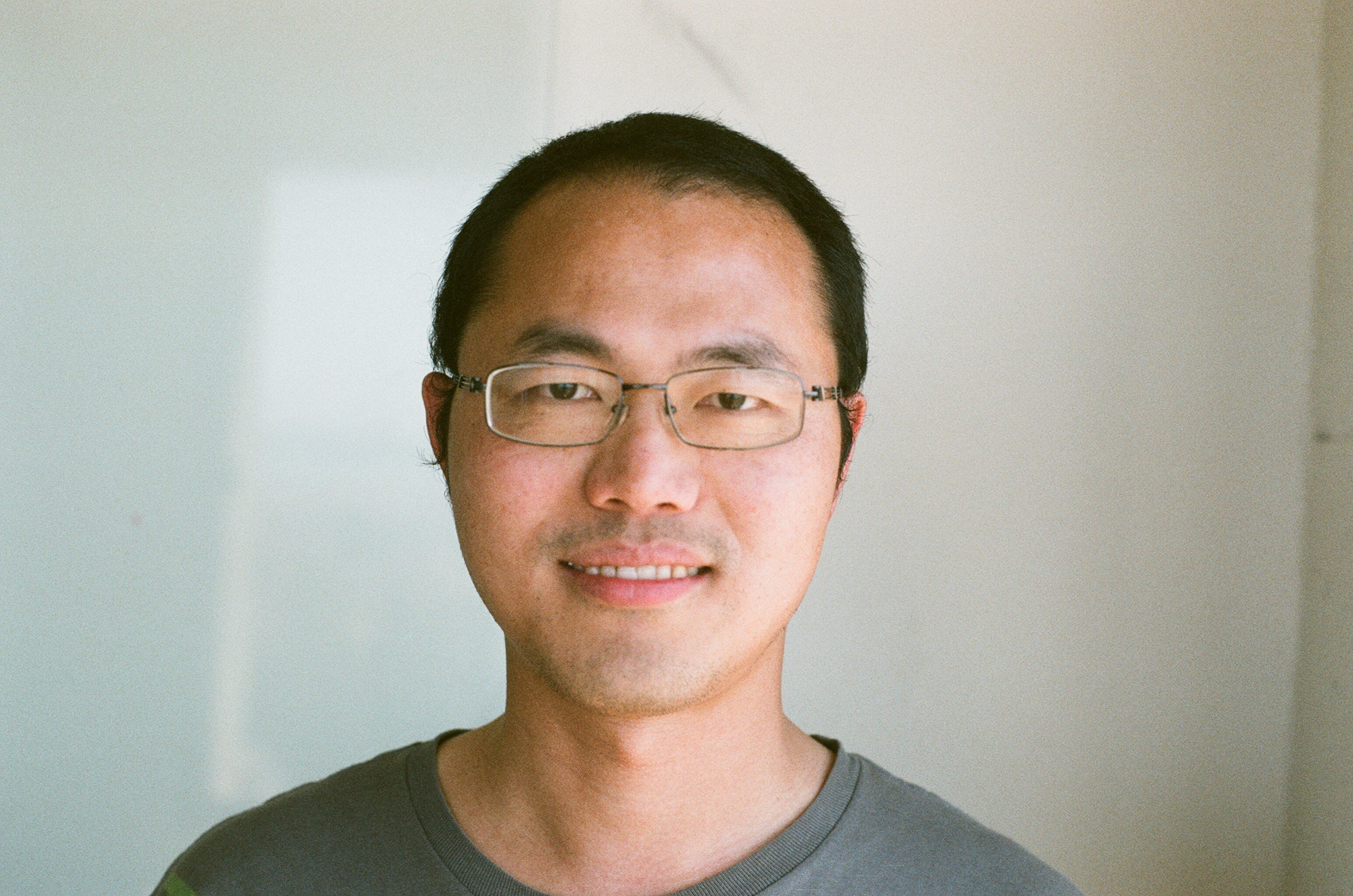
- Yuan in 2017
- Born: 1981 (age 44–45); Macheng, Hubei, China
- Education: Peking University (BA); Columbia University (PhD)
- Awards: Clay Research Fellow (2008)
- Scientific career
- Fields: Mathematics
- Workplaces: Peking University; University of California, Berkeley; Institute for Advanced Study; Princeton University; Harvard University
- Thesis: Equidistribution Theory over Algebraic Dynamical Systems (2008)
- Doctoral advisor: Shou-Wu Zhang

Xinyi Yuan (Chinese: 袁新意; born 1981) is a Chinese mathematician who is currently a professor of mathematics at Peking University working in number theory, arithmetic geometry, and automorphic forms. In particular, his work focuses on arithmetic intersection theory, algebraic dynamics, Diophantine equations and special values of L-functions.

== Early life and education ==
Xinyi Yuan is from Macheng, Huanggang, Hubei province, and graduated from Huanggang Middle School in 2000. That year, he received a gold medal at the International Mathematical Olympiad while representing China. Yuan obtained his A.B. in mathematics from Peking University in 2003 and his Ph.D. in mathematics from Columbia University in 2008 under the direction of Shou-Wu Zhang. His article "Big Line Bundles over Arithmetic Varieties," published in Inventiones Mathematicae, demonstrates a natural sufficient condition for when the orbit under the absolute Galois group is equidistributed.

== Career ==
He spent time at the Institute for Advanced Study, Princeton University, and Harvard University before joining the Berkeley faculty in 2012.

Yuan was appointed a Clay Research Fellow for a three-year term from 2008 to 2013. Together with a number of other collaborators, Yuan was profiled in Quanta Magazine and Business Insider for, among other things, his research on L-functions.

Yuan left UC Berkeley to become a full professor at Peking University in 2020. In 2025, Yuan was awarded the ICCM Gold medal at the International Congress of Chinese Mathematicians. He is also an invited speaker at the 2026 International Congress of Mathematicians.

== Research ==
In his thesis, Yuan generalized the equidistribution theorem of Lucien Szpiro, Emmanuel Ullmo and Shou-Wu Zhang to the broader framework of adelic line bundles and in particular to algebraic dynamical systems. Together with Shou-Wu Zhang, Yuan proved the averaged Colmez conjecture which was later shown to imply the André–Oort conjecture for Siegel modular varieties by Jacob Tsimerman.

With Shou-Wu Zhang, Yuan wrote a monograph generalizing the theory of adelic line bundles to quasi-projective varieties. Yuan subsequently applied these ideas to reprove the uniform Bogomolov conjecture for curves, thereby obtaining a new proof of Mazur's Conjecture B. Later, in collaboration with Jiawei Yu and Shengxuan Zhou, he derived the first explicit uniform estimate for the number of rational points on curves of genus at least two in terms only of the Jacobian rank.

Yuan has also made major contributions to Diophantine geometry over function fields through joint work with Junyi Xie. Their results include proofs of the geometric Bogomolov conjecture in arbitrary characteristic and the geometric Bombieri-Lang conjecture for ramified covers of abelian varieties.

== Publications (selected) ==
- Yuan, Xinyi (2008). "Big Line Bundles over Arithmetic Varieties" (PDF). Inventiones mathematicae. 173 (3): 603–649. doi:10.1007/s00222-008-0127-9.
- Yuan, Xinyi; Zhang, Shou-Wu; Zhang, Wei (2012). The Gross–Zagier formula on Shimura curves. Annals of Mathematics Studies. Vol. 184. Princeton University Press.
- Yuan, Xinyi; Zhang, Tong (2013). "Effective Bound of Linear Series on Arithmetic Surfaces" (PDF). Duke Mathematical Journal. 162 (10): 1723–1770. doi:10.1215/00127094-2322779.
- Yuan, Xinyi; Zhang, Shou-Wu (2018). "On the averaged Colmez conjecture". Annals of Mathematics. 187 (2): 553–638. arXiv:1507.06903. doi:10.4007/annals.2018.187.2.4. S2CID 118916754.
- Xie, Junyi; Yuan, Xinyi (2022). "Geometric Bogomolov conjecture in arbitrary characteristics". Inventiones Mathematicae. 229 (2): 607–637. arXiv:2108.09722. doi:10.1007/s00222-022-01112-1.
- Yuan, Xinyi; Zhang, Shou-Wu (2026). Adelic Line Bundles on Quasi-Projective Varieties. Annals of Mathematics Studies. Vol. 221. Princeton, NJ: Princeton University Press. ISBN 978-0-691-27172-9.
- Yuan, Xinyi (2026). "Arithmetic bigness and a uniform Bogomolov-type result". Annals of Mathematics. 2. 203 (1): 15–119. arXiv:2108.05625. doi:10.4007/annals.2026.203.1.2.
- Xie, Junyi; Yuan, Xinyi (2023). "Partial Heights, Entire Curves, and the Geometric Bombieri–Lang Conjecture". Acta Mathematica (to appear). arXiv:2305.14789.
- Xie, Junyi; Yuan, Xinyi (2023). "The Geometric Bombieri–Lang Conjecture for Ramified Covers of Abelian Varieties". Peking Mathematical Journal (to appear). arXiv:2308.08117.
- Yu, Jiawei; Yuan, Xinyi; Zhou, Shengxuan (2026). "Quantitativity on the number of rational points in the Mordell conjecture". arXiv:2602.01820 [math.NT].
