= Morningside Medal =

The Morningside Medal of Mathematics (Chinese: 晨兴数学奖) is awarded to exceptional mathematicians of Chinese descent under the age of forty-five for their seminal achievements in mathematics and applied mathematics. The winners of the Morningside Medal of Mathematics are traditionally announced at the opening ceremony of the triennial International Congress of Chinese Mathematicians. Each Morningside Medalist receives a certificate, a medal, and cash award of US$25,000 for a gold medal, or US$10,000 for a silver medal.

In 2013 Yitang Zhang was awarded the Morningside Special Achievement Award in Mathematics for his proof of the restricted twin prime conjecture.

== Gold Medalists ==
| Year | Medalists | Institution |
|---|---|---|
| 1998 | Chang-Shou Lin; Shouwu Zhang | National Chung Cheng University; Columbia University |
| 2001 | Jun Li; Horng-Tzer Yau | Stanford University; New York University |
| 2004 | Yizhao Hou; Kefeng Liu; Zhouping Xin; Zhiliang Ying | California Institute of Technology; Zhejiang University; Chinese University of Hong Kong; Columbia University |
| 2007 | Jianqing Fan; Xu-Jia Wang | Princeton University; Australian National University |
| 2010 | Mu-Tao Wang; Sijue Wu; Jun S. Liu | Columbia University; University of Michigan; Harvard University |
| 2013 | Xuhua He; Tian Ye; Xianfeng Gu | Hong Kong University of Science and Technology; Chinese Academy of Sciences; Dalian University of Technology, State University of New York at Stony Brook |
| 2016 | Wei Zhang; Si Li; Wotao Yin | Columbia University; Tsinghua University; University of California, Los Angeles |
| 2019 | Zhiwei Yun; Xinwen Zhu | Massachusetts Institute of Technology; California Institute of Technology |

== Silver Medalists ==
| Year | Medalists | Institution |
|---|---|---|
| 1998 | Raymond Chan; Chong-Qing Cheng; Kefeng Liu; Tong Yang | Chinese University of Hong Kong; Nanjing University; University of California, Los Angeles; City University of Hong Kong |
| 2001 | Daqing Wan; Chin-Lung Wang; Sijue Wu; Nanhua Xi | University of California, Irvine; Tsinghua University; University of Maryland, College Park; Chinese Academy of Sciences |
| 2004 | Jin-Yi Cai; Aiko Liu; Zhu Xiping | University of Wisconsin–Madison; University of California, Berkeley; Sun Yat-sen University |
| 2007 | Melissa Chiu-Chu Liu; Lizhen Ji; Shi Jin; Chiun-Chuan Chen; Ye Tian | Columbia University; University of Michigan; University of Wisconsin–Madison; National Taiwan University; Chinese Academy of Sciences |
| 2010 | Jungkai Alfred Chen and Meng Chen; Jixiang Fu; Juncheng Wei | National Taiwan University and Fudan University; Fudan University; Chinese University of Hong Kong |
| 2013 | Chieh-Yu Chang; Xiaoqing Li; Hao Xu; Tai-Peng Tsai | National Tsing Hua University; University at Buffalo; Harvard University; University of British Columbia |
| 2016 | Bing-Long Chen; Kai-Wen Lan; Ronald Lok Ming Lui; Jun Yin; Lexing Ying; Zhiwei Yun | Sun Yat-sen University; University of Minnesota; Chinese University of Hong Kong; University of Wisconsin–Madison; Stanford University; Stanford University |

== See also ==
- List of mathematics awards
