= Sarah Peluse =

American mathematician

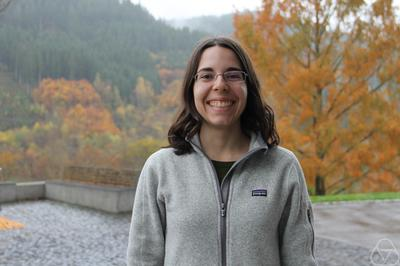
Peluse at Oberwolfach in 2019

Sarah Anne Peluse is an American mathematician specializing in arithmetic combinatorics and analytic number theory, and known for her research on generalizations of Szemerédi's theorem on the existence of polynomial progressions in dense sets of integers. She is an associate professor in the department of mathematics at Stanford University.

== Education and career ==
Peluse's interest in mathematics was sparked by a sixth-grade teacher using the Socratic method. After skipping seventh grade and running through all of the mathematics available at her local high school and community college, she enrolled at Lake Forest College in Illinois at age 15. The mathematics on offer there lasted her only for another two years, so she transferred to the University of Chicago, with Paul Sally and later Maryanthe Malliaris as mentors. She also became a member of the University of Chicago track and field team, which competed at two national championship meets, and she was recognized as a Division III All-Academic Athlete by the NCAA. She earned a bachelor's degree in mathematics in 2014.

Peluse completed her Ph.D. at Stanford University in 2019. Her dissertation, Bounds for sets with no nontrivial polynomial progressions, was supervised by Kannan Soundararajan. She became an NSF Postdoctoral Fellow at the University of Oxford, and then a Veblen Research Instructor at Princeton University and the Institute for Advanced Study, before taking her position as a faculty member at the University of Michigan. In September 2024, she became an associate professor of mathematics at Stanford.

== Recognition ==
As an undergraduate, Peluse won the 2014 Alice T. Schafer Prize of the Association for Women in Mathematics for her work in mathematics.

Peluse was the recipient of the 2022 Dénes König Prize, given at the SIAM Conference on Discrete Mathematics, for her work on polynomial generalizations of Szemerédi's theorem. She was also a 2022 recipient of the Maryam Mirzakhani New Frontiers Prize, associated with the Breakthrough Prize in Mathematics, "for contributions to arithmetic combinatorics and analytic number theory, particularly with regards to polynomial patterns in dense sets". She won the 2023 Salem Prize (joint with Julian Sahasrabudhe) for contributions to additive combinatorics and related fields, including her work on quantitative density theorems for polynomial configurations in arithmetic progressions, which have found application in discrete harmonic analysis and ergodic theory. In September 2025 Peluse was named the 2026 recipient of the AWM Microsoft Research Prize in Algebra and Number Theory.

She was named as a Fellow of the American Mathematical Society, in its 2027 class of fellows.
