= International Congress of Chinese Mathematicians =

The International Congress of Chinese Mathematicians (ICCM) (Chinese: 国际华人数学家大会) is an international non-governmental organization dedicated to bringing together Chinese mathematicians to discuss current research in mathematics as well as recognizing the achievements of Chinese mathematicians and mathematicians of Chinese descent around the world. The Congress was founded in 1998 and has been held every three years since.

The first Congress was convened in Beijing at the Great Hall of the People in December 1998. Since then, there have been six Congresses, held in Hong Kong, Hangzhou, Taipei in addition to Beijing. Universities and institutions in mainland China, Hong Kong, and Taiwan host the Congress on a rotating basis.

== Leadership ==
Past Congresses have been led by prominent mathematicians such as Fields Medalist Shing-Tung Yau, Kai Lai Chung, Alice Chang, among others. The Congress is sponsored by Shing-Tung Yau and Hong Kong entrepreneur Ronnie Chan. ICCM is run in collaboration with institutions such as the Chinese Academy of Sciences and the Academia Sinica of Taiwan.

== Prizes ==
The ICCM awards the Chern Prize and the Morningside Medal, among other prizes, to Chinese mathematicians who have made significant contributions to pure or applied mathematics. The Morningside Medal was established with the First Congress in 1998 and is awarded to mathematicians younger than 45; winners are traditionally announced on the first day of the ICCM. The Chern Prize was first awarded at the Second Congress in 2001 in honor of differential geometer Shiing-Shen Chern; thus it predates the Chern Medal awarded by the International Mathematical Union by nine years. Winners of both prizes are selected by a committee of prominent Chinese mathematicians.

The ICCM also presents the International Cooperation Award to individuals who promote mathematics through collaboration, teaching, and other forms of support.

== List of Congresses ==
| Year | City | Country |
|---|---|---|
| 2025 | Shanghai | China |
| 2022 | Nanjing | China |
| 2019 | Beijing | China |
| 2016 | Beijing | China |
| 2013 | Taipei | Taiwan |
| 2010 | Beijing | China |
| 2007 | Hangzhou | China |
| 2004 | Hong Kong | Hong Kong SAR |
| 2001 | Taipei | Taiwan |
| 1998 | Beijing | China |
