= Compositio Mathematica =

- Language: English
- Edited by: Fabrizio Andreatta, David Holmes, Bruno Klingler, and Éric Vasserot

Publication details
- History: 1935–present
- Publisher: Cambridge University Press in partnership with the London Mathematical Society on behalf of the Foundation Compositio Mathematica
- Frequency: Monthly
- Impact factor: 1.456 (2020)

Standard abbreviations
- ISO 4: Compos. Math.

Indexing
- CODEN: CMPMAF
- ISSN: 0010-437X (print); 1570-5846 (web)
- LCCN: 36007549
- OCLC no.: 300183571

Links
- Journal homepage; Journal page at publisher's website; Online access; Online archive (1935-1996)

Compositio Mathematica is a monthly peer-reviewed mathematics journal established by L.E.J. Brouwer in 1935. It is owned by the Foundation Compositio Mathematica, and since 2004 it has been published on behalf of the Foundation by the London Mathematical Society in partnership with Cambridge University Press. According to the Journal Citation Reports, the journal has a 2020 2-year impact factor of 1.456 and a 2020 5-year impact factor of 1.696.

The editors-in-chief are Fabrizio Andreatta, David Holmes, Bruno Klingler, and Éric Vasserot.

== Early history ==
The journal was established by L. E. J. Brouwer in response to his dismissal from Mathematische Annalen in 1928. An announcement of the new journal was made in a 1934 issue of the American Mathematical Monthly. In 1940, the publication of the journal was suspended due to the German occupation of the Netherlands.
