= Inventiones Mathematicae =

- Discipline: Mathematics
- Language: English
- Edited by: Rahul Pandharipande, Wilhelm Schlag

Publication details
- History: 1966-present
- Publisher: Springer Verlag
- Frequency: Monthly
- Impact factor: 2.946 (2016)

Standard abbreviations
- ISO 4: Invent. Math.

Indexing
- CODEN: INVMBH
- ISSN: 0020-9910 (print); 1432-1297 (web)
- LCCN: 66009875
- OCLC no.: 629078495

Links
- Journal homepage; Online access

Inventiones Mathematicae is a mathematical journal published monthly by Springer Science+Business Media. It was established in 1966 and is regarded as one of the most prestigious mathematics journals in the world. The current (2026) managing editors are Rahul Pandharipande (ETH Zurich) and Wilhelm Schlag (Yale University).

== Abstracting and indexing ==
The journal is abstracted and indexed in:

- Science Citation Index
- Scopus
- Zentralblatt Math
- Academic OneFile
- Current Contents/Physical, Chemical and Earth Sciences
- Mathematical Reviews
- VINITI Database RAS
