= Bôcher Memorial Prize =

American award for mathematical analysis

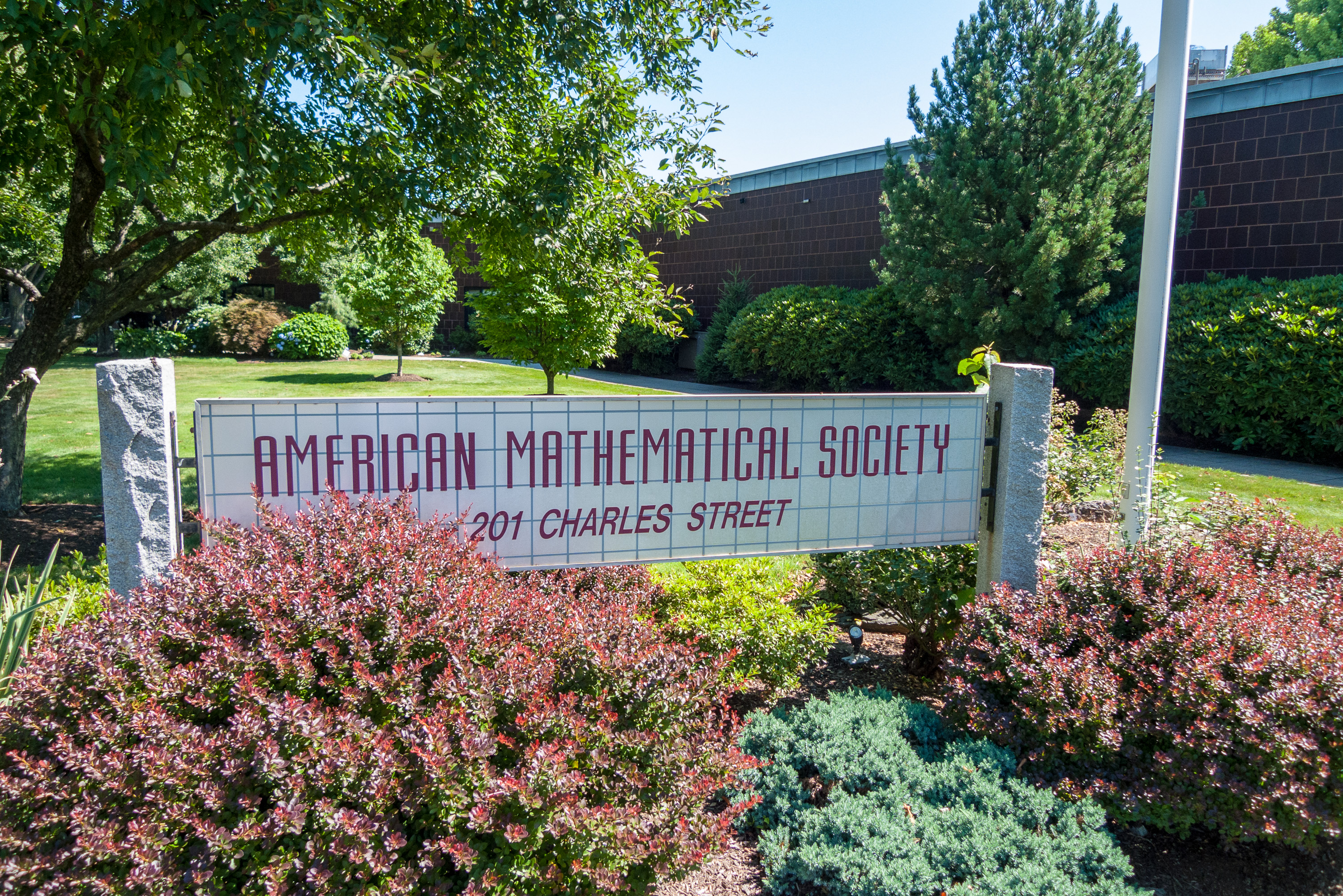
American Mathematical Society, Providence office

The Bôcher Memorial Prize was founded by the American Mathematical Society in 1923 in memory of Maxime Bôcher with an initial endowment of $1,450 (contributed by members of that society). It is awarded every three years (formerly every five years) for a notable research work in analysis that has appeared during the past six years. The work must be published in a recognized, peer-reviewed venue. The current award is $5,000.

There have been forty-one prize recipients. The first woman to win the award, Laure Saint-Raymond, did so in 2020. About eighty percent of the journal articles recognized since 2000 have been from Annals of Mathematics, the Journal of the American Mathematical Society, Inventiones Mathematicae, and Acta Mathematica.

== Past winners ==
- 1923 George David Birkhoff for

Dynamical systems with two degrees of freedom. Trans. Amer. Math. Soc. 18 (1917), 119-300.

- 1924 Eric Temple Bell for

Arithmetical paraphrases. I, II. Trans. Amer. Math. Soc. 22 (1921), 1-30, 198-219.

- 1924 Solomon Lefschetz for

On certain numerical invariants with applications to Abelian varieties. Trans. Amer. Math. Soc. 22 (1921), 407-482.

- 1928 James W. Alexander II for

Combinatorial analysis situs. Trans. Amer. Math. Soc. 28 (1926), 301-329.

- 1933 Marston Morse for

The foundations of a theory of the calculus of variations in the large in m-space. Trans. Amer. Math. Soc. 31 (1929), 379-404.

- 1933 Norbert Wiener for

Tauberian theorems. Ann. Math. 33 (1932), 1-100.

- 1938 John von Neumann for

Almost periodic functions. I. Trans. Amer. Math. Soc. 36 (1934), 445-294
Almost periodic functions. II. Trans. Amer. Math. Soc. 37 (1935), 21-50

- 1943 Jesse Douglas for

Green's function and the problem of Plateau. Amer. J. Math. 61 (1939), 545-589
The most general form of the problem of Plateau. Amer. J. Math. 61 (1939), 590-608
Solution of the inverse problem of the calculus of variations. Proc. Natl. Acad. Sci. U.S.A. 25 (1939), 631-637.

- 1948 Albert Schaeffer and Donald Spencer for

Coefficients of schlicht functions. I. Duke Math. J. 10 (1943), 611-635
Coefficients of schlicht functions. II. Duke Math. J. 12 (1945), 107-125
Coefficients of schlicht functions. III. Proc. Natl. Acad. Sci. U.S.A. 32 (!946), 111-116
Coefficients of schlicht functions. IV. Proc. Natl. Acad. Sci. U.S.A. 35 (1949), 143-150.

- 1953 Norman Levinson for "his contributions to the theory of linear, nonlinear, ordinary, and partial differential equations contained in his papers of recent years"
- 1959 Louis Nirenberg for "his work in partial differential equations"
- 1964 Paul Cohen for

On a conjecture of Littlewood and idempotent measures. Amer. J. Math. 82 (1960), 191-212.

- 1969 Isadore Singer for "his work on the index problem" and especially

The index of elliptic operators. I. Ann. of Math. (2) 87 (1968), 484-530
The index of elliptic operators. III. Ann. of Math. (2) 87 (1968), 546-604

both written with Michael Atiyah.

- 1974 Donald Samuel Ornstein for

Bernoulli shifts with the same entropy are isomorphic. Adv. Math. 4 (1970), 337-352.

- 1979 Alberto Calderón for "his fundamental work on the theory of singular integrals and partial differential equations" and in particular

Cauchy integrals on Lipschitz curves and related operators. Proc. Natl. Acad. Sci. U.S.A. 74 (1977), 1324-1327.

- 1984 Luis Caffarelli for "his deep and fundamental work in nonlinear partial differential equations, in particular his work on free boundary problems, vortex theory and regularity theory"
- 1984 Richard Melrose for "his solution of several outstanding problems in diffraction theory and scattering theory and for developing the analytical tools needed for their resolution"
- 1989 Richard Schoen for "his work on the application of partial differential equations to differential geometry," in particular

Conformal deformation of a Riemannian metric to constant scalar curvature. J. Diff. Geom. 20 (1984), 479-495.

- 1994 Leon Simon for:

Asymptotics for a class of nonlinear evolution equations, with applications to geometric problems. Ann. of Math. (2) 118 (1983), no. 3, 525–571.
Cylindrical tangent cones and the singular set of minimal submanifolds. J. Diff. Geom. 38 (1993), no. 3, 585–652.
Rectifiability of the singular set of energy minimizing maps. Calc. Var. Partial Differential Equations 3 (1995), no. 1, 1–65.

- 1999 Demetrios Christodoulou for:

The global nonlinear stability of the Minkowski space. Princeton Mathematical Series, 41. Princeton University Press, Princeton, NJ, 1993. x+514 pp. [written with Sergiu Klainerman]
Examples of naked singularity formation in the gravitational collapse of a scalar field. Ann. of Math. (2) 140 (1994), no. 3, 607–653.
The instability of naked singularities in the gravitational collapse of a scalar field. Ann. of Math. (2) 149 (1999), no. 1, 183–217

- 1999 Sergiu Klainerman for:

The global nonlinear stability of the Minkowski space. Princeton Mathematical Series, 41. Princeton University Press, Princeton, NJ, 1993. x+514 pp. [written with Demetrios Christodoulou]
Space-time estimates for null forms and the local existence theorem. Comm. Pure Appl. Math. 46 (1993), no. 9, 1221–1268 [with Matei Machedon]
Smoothing estimates for null forms and applications. Duke Math. J. 81 (1995), no. 1, 99–133 [with Matei Machedon]

- 1999 Thomas Wolff for "his work in harmonic analysis," "harmonic measure, and unique continuation," including

Counterexamples with harmonic gradients in ℝ^{3}. Essays on Fourier analysis in honor of Elias M. Stein (Princeton, NJ, 1991), 321–384, Princeton Math. Ser., 42, Princeton Univ. Press, Princeton, NJ, 1995
An improved bound for Kakeya type maximal functions. Rev. Mat. Iberoamericana 11 (1995), no. 3, 651–674.
A Kakeya-type problem for circles. Amer. J. Math. 119 (1997), no. 5, 985–1026

- 2002 Daniel Tătaru for

On global existence and scattering for the wave maps equations. Amer. J. Math. 123 (2001) no. 1, 37–77

in addition to his "important work on Strichartz estimates for wave equations with rough coefficients and applications to quasilinear wave equations, as well as his many deep contributions to unique continuation problems"

- 2002 Terence Tao for

Global regularity of wave maps I. Small critical Sobolev norm in high dimensions. Internat. Math. Res. Notices (2001), no. 6, 299–328
Global regularity of wave maps II. Small energy in two dimensions. Comm. Math. Phys. 2244 (2001), no. 2, 443–544.

in addition to "his remarkable series of papers, written in collaboration with J. Colliander, M. Keel, G. Staffilani, and H. Takaoka, on global regularity in optimal Sobolev spaces for KdV and other equations, as well as his many deep contributions to Strichartz and bilinear estimates."

- 2002 Lin Fanghua for

Some dynamical properties of Ginzburg-Landau vortices. Comm. Pure Appl. Math. 49 (1996), no. 4, 323–359.
Gradient estimates and blow-up analysis for stationary harmonic maps. Ann. of Math. (2) 149 (1999), no. 3, 785–829.

in addition to other "fundamental contributions to our understanding of the Ginzburg-Landau (GL) equations with a small parameter" and "many deep contributions to harmonic maps and liquid crystals."

- 2005 Frank Merle for "his fundamental work in the analysis of nonlinear dispersive equations" including:

Stability of blow-up profile and lower bounds for blow-up rate for the critical generalized KdV equation. Ann. of Math. (2) 155 (2002), no. 1, 235–280 [written with Yvan Martel]
Blow up in finite time and dynamics of blow up solutions for the L^{2}-critical generalized KdV equation. J. Amer. Math. Soc. 15 (2002), no. 3, 617–664 [written with Yvan Martel]
On universality of blow-up profile for L^{2} critical nonlinear Schrödinger equation. Invent. Math. 156 (2004), no. 3, 565–672 [with Pierre Raphael]

- 2008 Alberto Bressan for:

Hyperbolic systems of conservation laws. The one-dimensional Cauchy problem. Oxford Lecture Series in Mathematics and its Applications, 20. Oxford University Press, Oxford, 2000. xii+250 pp.
Vanishing viscosity solutions of nonlinear hyperbolic systems. Ann. of Math. (2) 161 (2005), no. 1, 223–342 [written with Stefano Bianchini]

- 2008 Charles Fefferman for "his many fundamental contributions to different areas of analysis" including

A sharp form of Whitney's extension theorem. Ann. of Math. (2) 161 (2005), no. 1, 509–577
Whitney's extension problem for C^{m}. Ann. of Math. (2) 164 (2006), no. 1, 313–359.

- 2008 Carlos Kenig for "his important contributions to harmonic analysis, partial differential equations, and nonlinear dispersive PDE" including:

Well-posedness and scattering results for the generalized Korteweg-de Vries equation via the contraction principle. Comm. Pure Appl. Math. 46 (1993), no. 4, 527–620 [written with Gustavo Ponce and Luis Vega]
Global well-posedness of the Benjamin-Ono equation in low-regularity spaces. J. Amer. Math. Soc. 20 (2007), no. 3, 753–798 [written with Alexandru Ionescu]
Global well-posedness, scattering and blow-up for the energy-critical focusing non-linear wave equation. Acta Math. 201 (2008), no. 2, 147–212 [written with Frank Merle]

- 2011 Assaf Naor for "introducing new invariants of metric spaces and for applying his new understanding of the distortion between various metric structures to theoretical computer science" and his "remarkable work [...] on a lower bound in the sparsest cut problem" including

On metric Ramsey-type phenomena. Ann. of Math. (2) 162 (2005), no. 2, 643–709 [written with Yair Bartal, Nathan Linial, and Manor Mendel]
Metric cotype. Ann. of Math. (2) 168 (2008), no. 1, 247–298 [written with Manor Mendel]
Euclidean distortion and the sparsest cut. J. Amer. Math. Soc. 21 (2008), no. 1, 1–21 [written with Sanjeev Arora and James R. Lee]
Compression bounds for Lipschitz maps from the Heisenberg group to L_{1}. Acta Math. 207 (2011), no. 2, 291–373 [written with Jeff Cheeger and Bruce Kleiner]

- 2011 Gunther Uhlmann for "his fundamental work on inverse problems" including

The Calderón problem with partial data. Ann. of Math. (2) 165 (2007), no. 2, 567–591 [written with Carlos Kenig and Johannes Sjöstrand]
The Calderón problem with partial data in two dimensions. J. Amer. Math. Soc. 23 (2010), no. 3, 655–691 [written with Oleg Imanuvilov and Masahiro Yamamoto]

as well as "incisive work on boundary rigidity with L. Pestov and with P. Stepanov and on nonuniqueness (also known as cloaking) with A. Greenleaf, Y. Kurylev, and M. Lassas."

- 2014 Simon Brendle for "his outstanding solutions of long standing problems in geometric analysis", including

Manifolds with 1/4-pinched curvature are space forms. J. Amer. Math. Soc. 22 (2009), no. 1, 287–307. [written with Richard Schoen]
Embedded minimal tori in S^{3} and the Lawson conjecture. Acta Math. 211 (2013), no. 2, 177–190.

in addition to "his deep contributions to the study of the Yamabe equation."

- 2017 András Vasy for

Microlocal analysis of asymptotically hyperbolic and Kerr-de Sitter spaces. Invent. Math. 194 (2013), 381-513.

- 2020 Camillo De Lellis for "his innovative point of view on the construction of continuous dissipative solutions of the Euler equations, which ultimately led to Isett's full solution of the Onsager conjecture, and his spectacular work in the regularity theory of minimal surfaces, where he completed and improved Almgren's program" including:

Dissipative continuous Euler flows. Invent. Math. 193 (2013), no. 2, 377–407 [written with László Székelyhidi]
Regularity of area minimizing currents III: blow-up. Ann. of Math. (2) 183 (2016), no. 2, 577–617 [written with Emanuele Spadaro]

- 2020 Lawrence Guth for "his deep and influential development of algebraic and topological methods for partitioning the Euclidean space and multi-scale organization of data, and his powerful applications of these tools in harmonic analysis, incidence geometry, analytic number theory, and partial differential equations" including:

A restriction estimate using polynomial partitioning. J. Amer. Math. Soc. 29 (2016), no. 2, 371–413
A sharp Schrödinger maximal estimate in ℝ^{2}. Ann. of Math. (2) 186 (2017), no. 2, 607–640 [written with Xiumin Du and Xiaochun Li]

- 2020 Laure Saint-Raymond for "her transformative contributions to kinetic theory, fluid dynamics, and Hilbert's sixth problem on 'developing mathematically the limiting processes...which lead from the atomistic view to the laws of motion of continua,'" including:

The Brownian motion as the limit of a deterministic system of hard-spheres. Invent. Math. 203 (2016), no. 2, 493–553 [written with Thierry Bodineau and Isabelle Gallagher]
Mathematical study of degenerate boundary layers: a large scale ocean circulation problem. Mem. Amer. Math. Soc. 253 (2018), no. 1206, vi+105 pp. [written with Anne-Laure Dalibard]

- 2023 Frank Merle, Pierre Raphaël, Igor Rodnianski, and Jérémie Szeftel for "their groundbreaking work establishing the existence of blow-up solutions to the defocusing NLS equation in some supercritical regimes and to the compressible Euler and Navier-Stokes equations" including

On the implosion of a compressible fluid I: smooth self-similar inviscid profiles. Annals of Mathematics 196 (2022);
On the implosion of a compressible fluid II: singularity formation. Annals of Mathematics 196 (2022); and
On blow up for the energy super critical defocusing nonlinear Schrödinger equations. Inventiones Mathematicae 227 (2022).

- 2026 Mihalis Dafermos, and Jonathan Luk for "their work on the C0- stability of the Kerr Cauchy horizon, which addresses the fundamental question of global uniqueness of solutions to the initial value problem for the Einstein equations of general relativity, disproves expectations, and calls for a rethinking of fundamental issues."

1. Mihalis Dafermos, Stability and instability of the Cauchy horizon for the spherically symmetric Einstein-Maxwell-scalar field equations. Annals of Mathematics, (2), 158(3), 2003, p. 875-928.
2. Jonathan Luk, Weak null singularities in general relativity. Journal of the American Mathematical Society, 31.1 (2018), p. 1-63.
3. Mihalis Dafermos and Jonathan Luk, The interior of dynamical vacuum black holes I: the C0-stability of the Kerr Cauchy horizon. To appear in Annals of Mathematics.

- 2026 Semyon Dyatlov, for his "pioneering work connecting the dynamics of geodesic flows and the behavior of waves (including Laplace eigenfunctions and solutions to the wave equation). It also introduced a new family of questions in Fourier analysis, extending the classical Heisenberg uncertainty principle in a novel direction." Including:

1. Semyon Dyatlov and Joshua Zahl, Spectral gaps, additive energy, and a fractal uncertainty principle. Geometric and Functional Analysis, 26.4 (2016): 1011-1094.
2. Jean Bourgain and Semyon Dyatlov, Spectral gaps without the pressure condition. Annals of Mathematics, 187.3 (2018): 825-867.
3. Semyon Dyatlov and Long Jin, Semiclassical measures on hyperbolic surfaces have full support. Acta Mathematica, 220(2) (June 2018), 297-339.
4. Semyon Dyatlov, Long Jin, and Stéphane Nonnenmacher, Control of eigenfunctions on surfaces of variable curvature. Journal of the American Mathematical Society 35.2 (2022):361-465.

== See also ==
- List of mathematics awards
