= Stanford University Mathematics Camp =

Stanford University Mathematics Camp, or SUMaC, is a competitive summer mathematics program for rising high school juniors and seniors around the world. The camp lasts for 4 weeks, usually from mid-July to mid-August. It is based on the campus of Stanford University. Like the Ross Program at Ohio State and the PROMYS program at Boston University, SUMaC does not put emphasis on competition-math preparations but focuses instead on advanced undergraduate math topics.

== History ==
SUMaC was founded in 1995 by Professors Rafe Mazzeo and Ralph Cohen of the Stanford Mathematics Department and has been directed from the beginning by Prof. Mazzeo, and Dr. Rick Sommer. Dr. Sommer was an assistant professor in the Stanford Mathematics Department and is currently a deputy director of the Education Program for Gifted Youth (EPGY), at Stanford. He designed the Program I course and has been teaching versions of it since the first SUMaC in 1995. The Program II course was designed and has been taught by Prof. Rafe Mazzeo. (In recent years, the course was cotaught by Dr. Pierre Albin, a former Stanford graduate student who currently teaches at MIT, and is currently taught by Dr. Simon Rubinstein-Salzedo, a postdoctoral fellow in statistics at Stanford.)

== Programs ==
- Program I investigates non-constructibility in geometry, classification of patterns in two dimensions, error-correcting codes, cryptography, and the analysis of the Rubik's Cube. The mathematics that is central to solving these problems comes from the areas of abstract algebra and number theory.
- Program II contains an introduction to selected topics in combinatorial, differential, and algebraic topology. The program emphasizes developing ideas from, and problems in, geometric topology where methods from abstract algebra and calculus have proven to be effective tools.

== Other activities ==
During the camp, there are frequent guest lectures given by internationally renowned mathematicians. These talks are in the areas of current mathematical research. Ravi Vakil, a current Stanford mathematics professor and a 4-time Putnam Fellow, talked to the students in 2007. Also in 2007, Tyson Mao, one of the best cube solvers in the world, taught SUMaC students how to solve the Rubik's Cube. Other speakers in 2007 included Drs. Kay Kirkpatrick (MIT), Ted Shifrin (University of Georgia), and Pete Storm (Stanford). In 2014, John Edmark, professor of art and art history at Stanford, spoke about his current work in mathematics-inspired sculptures, and Brian Conrey, executive director of the American Institute of Mathematics, gave a lecture on the Twin Primes Conjecture and the Riemann Hypothesis. Students at SUMaC also engage in a variety of sports activities during their free time. Such sports include basketball, tennis, badminton, table tennis, and ultimate. SUMaC was the backdrop for Justina Chen Headley's book Nothing But the Truth (and a Few White Lies), a teen novel about a half-Taiwanese girl who finally finds her identity at the math camp.

== Teaching assistants and counselors ==
Most of the SUMaC residential counselors and teaching assistants are Stanford mathematics graduate students and undergraduate math majors. SUMaC usually has a 1-to-4 ratio of staff to students, with most of the teaching assistants serving in the role of live-in counselors. Many of the SUMaC teaching assistants and counselors return from previous years, and some attended SUMaC in high school.

== Residence ==
SUMaC students have traditionally been housed in Synergy, a small Stanford-student residence that is a famously vegetarian co-op during the academic year, though there have been years when students lived in Κappa Alpha (KA). Each student has one, two or three roommates, and the floors are divided by sex. Dining takes place at a separate dining hall shared by other summer youth programs at Stanford.
