= Julie Rowlett =

American mathematician

- Born: August 5, 1978 (age 47)
- Education: U. Washington (BS); Stanford (PhD)
- Awards: Halmos–Ford award, 2016
- Scientific career
- Fields: Geometric analysis
- Institutions: University of Ingolstadt; Chalmers University
- Thesis: Spectral geometry and asymptotically conic convergence (2006)
- Doctoral advisor: Rafe Mazzeo
- Website: Home page

Julie Marie Rowlett (born 1978) is an American mathematician. She is a professor of mathematics at the Chalmers University of Technology. Her primary research interest is in geometric analysis with a particular focus on geometric analysis on singular spaces, dynamics, mathematical physics, and spectral theory.

== Biography ==
Rowlett earned her Bachelor of Science from the University of Washington in 2001, and her Ph.D. from Stanford University in 2006. Her dissertation, Spectral Geometry and Asymptotically Conic Convergence, was supervised by Rafe Mazzeo.

Rowlett was a postdoctoral researcher at the Centre de Recherches Mathématiques and McGill University in Montreal. After a short period as an instructor in the Education Program for Gifted Youth at Stanford University, and a position as visiting assistant professor at the University of California, Santa Barbara, Rowlett left the US in 2009 for Germany. There, she held a series of temporary positions at the Hausdorff Center for Mathematics from 2009 to 2010, the Max Planck Institute for Mathematics from 2011 to 2012, the University of Göttingen from 2012 to 2013, and Leibniz University Hannover from 2013 to 2014. She received her habilitation at the University of Göttingen in 2013 and took a permanent position at the University of Ingolstadt in 2014. In 2015 Rowlett moved to Sweden for her current position at Chalmers University of Technology.

== Awards ==
In 2016, she received the Paul R. Halmos – Lester R. Ford Award together with Zhiqin Lu of the University of California, Irvine, for their joint work on hearing the shape of a drum. Although there exist pairs of drum shapes that sound the same, Rowlett and Lu showed that certain shapes of drums, such as parallelograms and acute trapezoids, can be distinguished from others by their sounds.
