= Helffer–Sjöstrand formula =

Mathematical tool from spectral theory and functional analysis

The Helffer–Sjöstrand formula is a mathematical tool used in spectral theory and functional analysis to represent functions of self-adjoint operators. Named after Bernard Helffer and Johannes Sjöstrand, this formula provides a way to calculate functions of operators without requiring the operator to have a simple or explicitly known spectrum. It is especially useful in quantum mechanics, condensed matter physics, and other areas where understanding the properties of operators related to energy or observables is important.

== Background ==
If $f \in C_c^\infty (\mathbb{R})$, then we can find a function $\tilde f \in C_c^\infty (\mathbb{C})$ such that $\tilde{f}|_{\mathbb{R}} = f$, and for each $N \ge 0$, there exists a $C_N > 0$ such that

$|\bar{\partial} \tilde{f}| \leq C_N |\operatorname{Im} z|^N.$

Such a function $\tilde{f}$ is called an almost analytic extension of $f$.

== The formula ==
If $f \in C_c^\infty(\mathbb{R})$ and $A$ is a self-adjoint operator on a Hilbert space, then

$f(A) = \frac{1}{\pi} \int_{\mathbb{C}} \bar{\partial} \tilde{f}(z) (z - A)^{-1} \, dx \, dy$

where $\tilde{f}$ is an almost analytic extension of $f$, and $\bar{\partial}_z := \frac{1}{2}(\partial_{Re(z)} + i\partial_{Im(z)})$.

== See also ==
- Cauchy's integral formula
