= Black hole stability conjecture =

Conjecture in general relativity

The black hole stability conjecture is the conjecture that a perturbation of a black hole solution of the Einstein field equations will settle back down to a black hole state. The relevant black hole solutions are described by metrics such as the Kerr metric, which describes isolated rotating black holes, or the Kerr–Newman–de–Sitter metric, which describes charged rotating black holes in an expanding universe. The mathematical foundation for the conjecture is work by the French mathematician Yvonne Choquet-Bruhat from 1952, which showed that the initial value problem for the Einstein field equations is well-posed. The conjecture then states that small perturbations of the initial conditions of a black hole disperse over time, while the parameters of the black hole (mass, angular momentum and charge) settle down to some new values.

The stability of the Schwarzschild metric under infinitesimal perturbations was first investigated by Tullio Regge and John Archibald Wheeler in 1957. and Frank Zerilli, who discovered the Regge–Wheeler–Zerilli equations. Following the discovery of the Kerr metric by Roy Kerr in 1963, these investigations were extended to rotating black holes by Saul Teukolsky, C. V. Vishveshwara, Robert Wald, Bernard Whiting and others.

The conjecture was proved for Kerr black holes by Peter Hintz in 2026. This result applies to all subextremal Kerr black holes, which are those that possess an event horizon. In terms of the parameters $M$ (mass) and $a$ (angular momentum) of the Kerr metric, subextremality is the condition $|a|<M$. The superextremal (sometimes called overextreme) Kerr spacetime, for which $|a|>M$, does not possess an event horizon and does not describe a black hole anymore, but is an example of a naked singularity. A series of papers culminating in 2022 was published by Elena Giorgi, Sergiu Klainerman and Jérémie Szeftel which gave a proof of the conjecture for slowly rotating Kerr black holes, for which $|a|\ll M$. In 2021, Mihalis Dafermos, Gustav Holzegel, Martin Taylor and Igor Rodnianski proved the stability of the Schwarzschild spacetime for all perturbations that ensure that the black hole that the spacetime settles down to has vanishing angular momentum. A stability result for the Schwarzschild spacetime among solutions with special symmetries was published by Klainerman and Szeftel in 2017.

A 2016 paper by Peter Hintz and András Vasy proved the stability of slowly rotating Kerr black holes in de Sitter space.

== See also ==
- Final state conjecture
- Stability of matter
- Positive energy theorem
- Birkhoff's theorem (relativity)
- Penrose–Hawking singularity theorems
- Hoop conjecture
