= Jared Wunsch =

American mathematician

- Education: Harvard University; Princeton University
- Awards: Fellow of the American Mathematical Society (2013); Simons Fellowship in Mathematics (2021)
- Scientific career
- Fields: Mathematics
- Workplaces: Northwestern University
- Thesis: Microlocal analysis of the time-dependent Schrödinger operator (1998)
- Doctoral advisor: Richard B. Melrose

Jared Wunsch is an American mathematician working in the areas of partial differential equations, microlocal analysis, spectral theory and mathematical physics. He is currently a professor of mathematics at Northwestern University.

== Education and career ==
Wunsch attended Princeton University, obtaining his A.B. in mathematics with a senior thesis under the supervision of Elias M. Stein in 1993. He received his PhD from Harvard University under the supervision of Richard B. Melrose in 1998. Following his postdoctoral appointment at the Columbia University, he was an assistant professor at Stony Brook University from 2000 to 2002. After this appointment, he joined Northwestern University and became tenured in 2009. He served as department chair from 2012 to 2015.

== Recognition ==
Wunsch was elected a fellow of the American Mathematical Society in 2013, and, along with Bryna Kra, he was awarded the Simons Fellowship in mathematics by the Simons Foundation in 2021.

== Research ==
The main feature of Wunsch's work is the application of tools from microlocal analysis to problems in Schrödinger and wave equations, as well as numerical analysis. He analyzed the propagation of singularities for solutions of wave equation on conic manifolds with Richard B. Melrose and later on edge manifolds with Richard B. Melrose and András Vasy. His most cited results include his work on resolvent estimates on hyperbolic trapped sets with Maciej Zworski and his work on sharp Strichartz estimates on conic manifolds with Andrew Hassell and Terence Tao.
