= Promethea Pythaitha =

American child genius

Promethea Olympia Kyrene Pythaitha
- Born: Jasmine Smith; 1991 (age 34–35)
- Occupation: student
- Known for: earning college degree at 13

Promethea Olympia Kyrene Pythaitha (born "Jasmine Smith" in 1991) is an American child genius with an IQ of 173. She started reading at age 1, began learning college-level calculus and was profiled by a CBS News 48 Hours special on "Whiz Kids!" at age 7, and at age 13 became the youngest student to complete work for a bachelor's degree from Montana State University in Mathematics.

== Early life and education ==
Pythaitha was born to David Li and Georgia Smith, a Greek-born artist, and has two older siblings. For several months when Promethea was 4, she and her family were homeless and lived in their car in San Francisco. This was when her mother began to teach her advanced mathematics. At age 5, she was enrolled in Stanford University's Education Program for Gifted Youth. After being featured on a national CBS News special "Whiz Kids!", she was allowed to enroll as a regular student earning credit toward graduation at Montana State University. Pythaitha audited her first university course, calculus, at age 7. At age 13, she completed the course work necessary for a bachelor's degree in mathematics, and at age 14 she officially graduated.

Paying for college had always been a difficulty due to her young age: she was automatically disqualified for most university scholarships, and couldn't legally work. A local family had paid for her tuition through the completion of her first degree, but she could not afford to continue with her studies. Pythaitha wrote to Montana politicians, arguing that the state of Montana pledges a taxpayer funded education to typical teenagers (in high school), but that she was unfairly ineligible. Her alma mater offered to waive her tuition until she turned 16.

In 2004, she changed her name from Jasmine Smith to Promethea Olympia Kyrene Pythaitha, selecting names reflecting her aspirations and the ideals that she admired in ancient Greek history.

== Controversy ==
In 2006, Pythaitha was awarded a $10,000 scholarship by the PanHellenic Scholarship Foundation. In January 2007, she was invited to speak in Chicago at a banquet to honor the Festival of the Three Hierarchs, a commemoration of the three founders of the Greek Orthodox Church. Her topic was to be the role of the church in education. During her research on the church founders, Pythaitha became convinced that the church had committed genocide. In her speech, she demanded a separation of church and state, as well as the end of church control on education. The event was posted to YouTube and seen by Greeks around the world. Pythaitha received messages from passionate Greeks in America and Greece. Some sent her hate mail, but others commended her courage and sent books and offers of tuition. After her speech, she was invited to visit Greece for five days and was interviewed by Alpha TV.

In 2011, a stalker of hers was shot and killed by sheriff's deputies after pointing a handgun at her and her mother, and in 2013, a settlement was reached in the subsequent court case.
