= Gunther Uhlmann =

Chilean mathematician

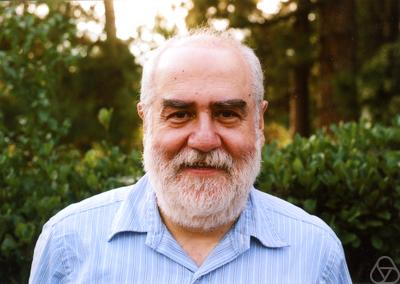
- 2010 photograph of Uhlmann by George Bergman
- Born: Gunther Alberto Uhlmann Arancibia; February 9, 1952 (age 74); Chile
- Education: University of Chile, Licentiate (1973)
- Occupation: Mathematician

Gunther Alberto Uhlmann Arancibia (9 February 1952, Chile) is a mathematician whose research focuses on inverse problems and imaging, microlocal analysis, partial differential equations and invisibility.

== Education and career ==
Uhlmann studied mathematics as an undergraduate at the Universidad de Chile in Santiago, gaining his licenciatura degree in 1973. He continued his studies at MIT where he received a PhD in 1976. He held postdoctoral positions at MIT, Harvard and NYU, including a Courant Instructorship at the Courant Institute in 1977–1978. In 1980, he became Assistant Professor at MIT and then moved in 1985 to the University of Washington. He has been the Walker Family Professor at the University of Washington since 2006. During 2010–2012 he was on leave at the University of California, Irvine, as the Excellence in Teaching Endowed Chair. Uhlmann was Finnish Distinguished Professor 2012–2017. He is currently also the Si-Yuan Professor at the Institute for Advanced Studies of the Hong Kong University of Science and Technology since 2014.

== Awards and honors ==
Uhlmann has received several honors for his research including a Sloan Fellowship in 1984 and a Guggenheim fellowship in 2001. In 2001 he was elected a Corresponding Member of the Chilean Academy of Sciences. He is a Fellow of the Institute of Physics since 2004. He was elected to the American Academy of Arts and Sciences in 2009 and a SIAM Fellow in 2010. He was an Invited Speaker at ICM in Berlin in 1998 and a Plenary Speaker at International Congress on Industrial and Applied Mathematics in Zurich in 2007. He was named a Clay Senior Scholar at the Mathematical Sciences Research Institute (MSRI) at Berkeley in the Fall of 2010. In Fall 2010 he held the Chancellor Professorship at UC Berkeley. He was named a Highly Cited Researcher by ISI in 2004. He was awarded the Bôcher Memorial Prize in 2011 and the Kleinman Prize also in 2011. In Fall 2011 he was a Rothschild Distinguished Visiting Fellow at the Isaac Newton Institute for Mathematical Sciences, Cambridge, UK. Uhlmann delivered the American Mathematical Society (AMS) Einstein Lecture in 2012. He was awarded the Fondation Math'ematiques de Paris Research Chair for 2012–2013. He was elected to the Washington State Academy of Sciences in 2012 and is also an AMS Fellow since 2012. He was awarded a Simons Fellowship for 2013–2014. In 2013, he was elected Foreign Member of the Finnish Academy of Science and Letters. He gave a Plenary Lecture at the International Congress on Mathematical Physics in 2015 and a Plenary Lecture at the V Congreso Latinamericano de Matemáticos (CLAM) in 2016. In 2017 he was awarded the Solomon Lefschetz Medal by the Mathematical Council of the Americas. In the Fall of 2019, Uhlmann was a Clay Senior Scholar at MSRI, Berkeley. In 2021 he was awarded by AMS and SIAM the George David Birkhoff Prize. In 2021, he also received a Simons Fellowship. In 2022 he was awarded the Doctor Honoris Causa by the University of Helsinki. In 2023 he was elected as a member of the National Academy of Sciences. Uhlmann was awarded in 2025 the Doctor Honoris Causa of the University of Chile. In 2026 he will receive the Sven Berggren Prize of the Royal Physiographic Society of Lund.

== Research ==
The earlier work of Uhlmann was in microlocal analysis and propagation of singularities for equations with multiple characteristics, in particular in understanding the phenomenon of conical refraction. He and Richard Burt Melrose pioneered the study of paired Lagrangian distributions. A striking application of this theory was given in the article with Allan Greenleaf on restricted X-ray transform. He and John Sylvester made a major breakthrough in Calderón's inverse problem that has led to many other developments including the case of partial data. Applications of this problem include Electrical resistivity tomography in geophysics and Electrical impedance tomography in medical imaging. Another major breakthrough was the solution of the boundary rigidity problem in two dimensions with Leonid Pestov and in higher dimensions with Plamen Stefanov and András Vasy.

Uhlmann has also been interested in cloaking and invisibility. Uhlmann postulates the first mathematical equations to create invisible materials. He and coauthors pioneered the idea of transformation optics for the case of electrostatics. Surveys of results by Uhlmann and coauthors on cloaking can be found in.

== See also ==
- List of Guggenheim Fellowships awarded in 2001
