= Peter Hintz =

German mathematician

- Born: 1991 (age 34–35); Kassel
- Education: University of Göttingen; Stanford University
- Awards: Miller Research Fellowship (2015–2017); Clay Research Fellowship (2017–2020); Alfred P. Sloan Research Fellowship (2020–2022); Golden Owl (2022); Frontiers of Science Award (2023); IAMP Early Career Award (2024)
- Scientific career
- Fields: Mathematics
- Workplaces: ETH Zürich; Massachusetts Institute of Technology; Pennsylvania State University
- Thesis: Global analysis of linear and non-linear wave equations on cosmological spacetimes (2015)
- Doctoral advisor: András Vasy

Peter Hintz (born 1991 in Kassel, Germany) is a German mathematician working in the areas of partial differential equations, microlocal analysis, scattering theory and general relativity. He is currently a professor of mathematics at Pennsylvania State University.

== Education and career ==
Hintz graduated with a BSc in mathematics and a BSc in physics from the University of Göttingen in 2011. He obtained his PhD in 2015 at Stanford University under the supervision of András Vasy.

After his postdoctoral appointments at the Miller Institute and Clay Mathematics Institute, he joined the faculty of the Massachusetts Institute of Technology as an assistant professor in 2019, later becoming an associate professor. In 2021, he moved to ETH Zürich as an associate professor of mathematics and physics. As of Fall 2025, he is a full professor of mathematics at Pennsylvania State University.

== Awards and honors ==
Hintz was Miller Research Fellow from 2015 to 2017, where he was mentored by Maciej Zworski. He subsequently was a Clay Research Fellow from 2017 to 2020. During his time as a faculty member of the Massachusetts Institute of Technology, he was an Alfred P. Sloan Research Fellow from 2020 to 2022. In 2021, he delivered a plenary lecture at the 20th International Congress on Mathematical Physics. The following year, Hintz gave a special invited lecture at the International Congress of Mathematicians together with Gustav Holzegel (de). In 2022, he was awarded the Golden Owl for excellence in teaching at ETH Zürich. He received a Frontiers of Science Award in 2023 and the IAMP Early Career Award in 2024.

== Research ==
Hintz's work applies methods from microlocal analysis as well as scattering and spectral theory to hyperbolic partial differential equations arising in Einstein's theory of general relativity. In 2026, he proved the black hole stability conjecture for the family of Kerr black holes for all subextremal angular momenta. Previously, in collaboration with András Vasy, he proved the nonlinear stability of the Kerr-de Sitter family of black holes. He also co-authored a paper on possible violations of Sir Roger Penrose's strong cosmic censorship conjecture. Among his other contributions is a proof of Price's law on the rate of decay of waves on Kerr black hole spacetimes.

== Books ==
- Hintz, Peter (October 2025). An Introduction to Microlocal Analysis. Graduate Texts in Mathematics. Vol. 304. Springer-Verlag, Cham. doi:10.1007/978-3-031-90706-7. ISBN 978-3-031-90705-0.
