= András Vasy =

Hungarian–American mathematician (born 1969)

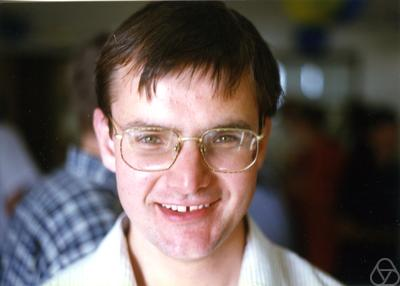
- Vasy in 1997
- Born: 1969 (age 56–57); Budapest
- Education: Massachusetts Institute of Technology
- Awards: Alfred P. Sloan Research Fellowship (2002–2004); Clay Research Fellowship (2004–2006); Bôcher Prize (2017)
- Scientific career
- Fields: Mathematics
- Workplaces: Massachusetts Institute of Technology; Stanford University
- Thesis: Propagation of singularities in three-body scattering (1997)
- Doctoral advisor: Richard B. Melrose

András Vasy (born 1969) is a Hungarian–American mathematician working in the areas of partial differential equations, microlocal analysis, scattering theory, and inverse problems. He is currently a professor of mathematics at Stanford University.

== Education and career ==
Vasy grew up in Budapest and attended Apáczai Csere János Gimnázium of the Eötvös Loránd University (ELTE). He then became a boarding-school student at the United World College of the Atlantic in Wales. Vasy attended Stanford University, obtaining his BS in Physics and MS in mathematics in 1993. He received his PhD from MIT under the supervision of Richard B. Melrose in 1997. Following his postdoctoral appointment at the University of California, Berkeley, he joined the MIT faculty as an assistant professor in 1999. He was awarded tenure at MIT in 2005 during a long-term stay at Northwestern University before moving to Stanford in 2006.

== Awards and honors ==
Vasy was an Alfred P. Sloan Research Fellow from 2002 to 2004, and a Clay Research Fellow from 2004 to 2006. He was elected a Fellow of the American Mathematical Society in 2012. He was an invited speaker at the International Congress of Mathematicians in Seoul in 2014. In 2017, he was awarded the Bôcher Prize of the American Mathematical Society.

== Research ==
The unifying feature of Vasy's work is the application of tools from microlocal analysis to problems in hyperbolic partial differential or pseudo-differential equations. He analyzed the propagation of singularities for solutions of wave equations on manifolds with corners or more complicated boundary structures, partially in joint work with Richard Melrose and Jared Wunsch. For his paper on a unified approach to scattering theory on asymptotically hyperbolic spaces and spacetimes arising in Einstein's theory of general relativity such as de Sitter space and Kerr-de Sitter spacetimes, he was awarded the Bôcher Prize in 2017. This paper led to further advances, including the proof, by Vasy and Peter Hintz, of the global nonlinear stability of the Kerr-de Sitter family of black hole spacetimes, and a new proof of Smale's conjecture for Anosov flows by Semyon Dyatlov and Maciej Zworski. Vasy has also collaborated with Gunther Uhlmann on inverse problems for geodesic transforms.

== Books ==
- Grieser, Daniel; Teufel, Stefan; Vasy, András, eds. (December 13, 2012). Microlocal Methods in Mathematical Physics and Global Analysis. Springer. ISBN 978-3-0348-0466-0.
- Melrose, Richard B.; Vasy, András; Wunsch, Jared (2013). Diffraction of Singularities for the Wave Equation on Manifolds with Corners. Société mathématique de France. ISBN 978-2-85629-367-6.
- Stefanov, Plamen; Vasy, A.; Zworski, Maciej, eds. (May 5, 2014). Inverse Problems and Applications: Conference on Inverse Problems, in Honor of Gunther Uhlmann, June 18-22, 2012, University of California, Irvine. American Mathematical Society. ISBN 978-1-4704-1079-7.
- Vasy, András (December 21, 2015). Partial Differential Equations: An Accessible Route through Theory and Applications. American Mathematical Society. ISBN 978-1-4704-1881-6.
