= Frank Merle (mathematician) =

French mathematician (born 1962)

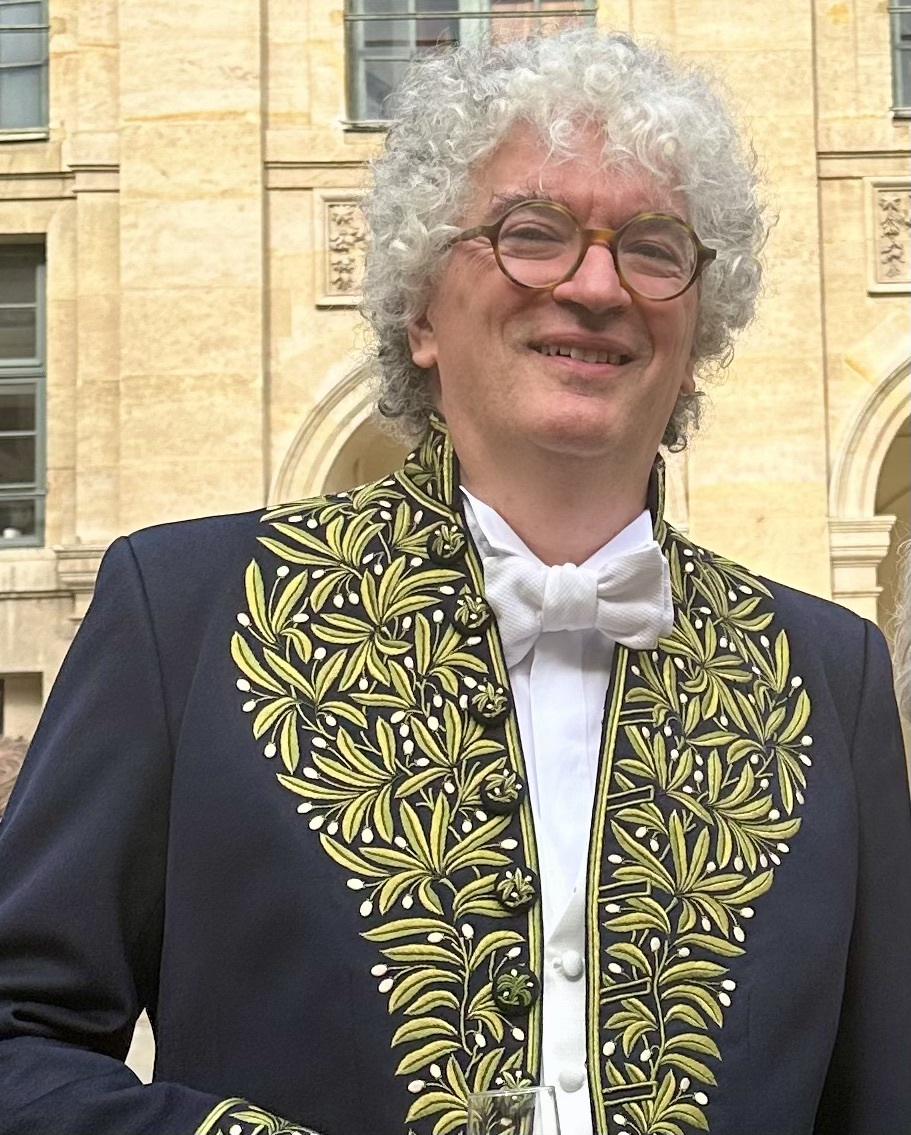
- Born: 22 November 1962 (age 63); Marseille, France
- Citizenship: French
- Education: École normale supérieure University of Paris VI
- Awards: Bôcher Memorial Prize (2005); Prix Ampère (2018); Bôcher Memorial Prize (2023); Clay Research Award (2023); Breakthrough Prize in Mathematics (2026)
- Scientific career
- Fields: Partial differential equations, mathematical physics
- Workplaces: University of Cergy-Pontoise; Courant Institute of Mathematical Sciences; Stanford University; Rutgers University; University of Chicago; Leiden University; University of Tokyo; Institut des Hautes Études Scientifiques
- Thesis: Contributions a l'etude de certaines equations aux derivees partielles non lineaires de la physique mathematique (1987)

Frank Merle (born 22 November 1962) is a French mathematician, specializing in partial differential equations and mathematical physics.

== Early life, education and career ==
Frank Merle was born on 22 November 1962 in Marseille. After graduation from the École Normale Supérieure (ENS), Merle received in 1987 his Ph.D. from the University of Paris VI under Henri Berestycki with thesis Contributions a l'etude de certaines equations aux derivees partielles non lineaires de la physique mathematique. He became a researcher for CNRS at ENS. In 1989/90 he was an assistant professor at the Courant Institute of Mathematical Sciences at NYU. Since 1991 Merle has been a professor at the University of Cergy-Pontoise. From 1998 to 2003 he was a member of the Institut Universitaire de France. In the fall of 1996, the fall of 2001, and the academic year 2003–2004 he was a visiting scholar at the Institute for Advanced Study. He was a visiting professor at Stanford University, Rutgers University, the University of Chicago, the Mathematical Sciences Research Institute (MSRI) at Berkeley, Leiden University, and the University of Tokyo. Frank Merle holds the Analysis Chair at the Institut des Hautes Études Scientifiques in Bures-sur-Yvette

== Mathematical research ==
Merle does research on partial differential equations (PDEs) and mathematical physics, notably dispersive nonlinear PDEs such as the nonlinear Schrödinger equation and the Korteweg–De Vries equation, and the study of such PDE solutions which over time break down or diverge (blow up). Such research earned him in 2005 the Bôcher Prize which he earned again in 2023.

Merle received the 2026 Breakthrough Prize in Mathematics for significantly advancing the modern understanding of nonlinear evolution equations.

== Personal life ==
Frank Merle is married to the artist Rebecca Dolinsky (born 26 May 1962) and has two sons, computer scientist Jascha Theophile Dolinsky Merle (born 23 May 2002) and Maxim Salomon Dolinsky Merle (born 13 June 2007).

== Selected publications ==
- Martel, Yvan; Merle, Frank (2002). "Stability of blow-up profile and lower bounds for blow-up rate for the critical generalized KdV equation". Annals of Mathematics. 155 (1): 235–280. arXiv:math/0405229. doi:10.2307/3062156. JSTOR 3062156. S2CID 14960075.
- with Y. Martel: "Blow up in finite time and dynamics of blow up solutions for the L^{2}-critical generalized KdV equation". J. Amer. Math. Soc. 15: 617–664. 2002. doi:10.1090/S0894-0347-02-00392-2. MR 1896235.
- Merle, Frank; Raphael, Pierre (2004). "On universality of blow-up profile for L^{2} critical nonlinear Schroedinger equation". Inventiones Mathematicae. 156 (3): 565–672. Bibcode:2004InMat.156..565M. doi:10.1007/s00222-003-0346-z. S2CID 122944822.

== Awards and honours ==
- 1997: Prix de l'Institut Poincaré en Physique théorique
- 1998: Invited speaker at the International Congress of Mathematicians in Berlin; lecture entitled Blow-up phenomena for critical nonlinear Schrödinger and Zakharov equations
- 2000: Prix Charles-Louis de Saulse de Freycinet de l'Académie des Sciences de Paris
- 2005: Médaille d'argent du CNRS
- 2005: Bôcher Memorial Prize
- 2014: Plenary speaker at the International Congress of Mathematicians in Seoul; lecture entitled Asymptotics for critical nonlinear dispersive equations
- 2018: Prix Ampère awarded by French Academy of Sciences
- 2023: Bôcher Memorial Prize, jointly to Merle, Raphaël, Rodnianski, and Szeftel
- 2023: Clay Research Award
- 2026: Breakthrough Prize in Mathematics
