= Yvan Martel =

French mathematician (born 1970)

Yvan Martel (born January 5, 1970) is a French mathematician.

== Education and career ==
Martel matriculated in 1989 at the École Polytechnique and graduated there in 1992 with an undergraduate degree and in 1993 with a Diplôme d'études approfondies (DEA) in nonlinear analysis and numerical analysis. At Pierre and Marie Curie University (Paris 6) he graduated in 1996 with Thèse de Doctorat (PhD) under the supervision of Thierry Cazenave. At the Cergy-Pontoise University, Martel habilitated in 2000 with advisor Jean Ginibre.

Martel's research deals with partial differential equations from mathematical physics, especially solitons. He has collaborated extensively with Frank Merle.

Martel was a Maître de conférences at Cergy-Pontoise University from 1997 to 2004, on leave at École Polytechnique as a full-time associate professor (Professeur chargé de cours à temps complet) from 2002 to 2004. From 2004 to 2012 he was a part-time associate professor (Professeur chargé de cours à temps incomplet) at École Polytechnique and a professor at Versailles Saint-Quentin-en-Yvelines University. He was the director of the laboratoire de mathématiques de Versailles (UVSQ/CNRS UMR8100) from 2008 to 2012 and the director of the Centre de mathématiques Laurent-Schwartz (CMLS) from 2012 to 2017. Since 2012 he is a professor at École Polytechnique at CMLS.

In 2008 Martel was an invited speaker at the European Congress of Mathematics in Amsterdam. From 2008 to 2012, he was a junior member of the Institut Universitaire de France. In 2011 he gave a one-hour lecture at the Rivière-Fabes symposium in Minneapolis. In 2018 he was an invited speaker at the International Congress of Mathematicians in Rio de Janeiro.

Martel was Fields medalist Hong Wang's mentor for her postgraduate reading course at École Polytechnique. Wang praised Martel for helping her regain her confidence in mathematics.

== Selected publications ==
- Cabré, Xavier; Martel, Yvan (1999). "Existence versus explosion instantanée pour des équations de la chaleur linéaires avec potentiel singulier". Comptes Rendus de l'Académie des Sciences, Série I. 329 (11): 973–978. Bibcode:1999CRASM.329..973C. doi:10.1016/S0764-4442(00)88588-2. hdl:2117/764. ISSN 0764-4442.
- Martel, Yvan; Merle, Frank (2002). "Stability of Blow-Up Profile and Lower Bounds for Blow-Up Rate for the Critical Generalized KDV Equation". Annals of Mathematics. 155 (1): 235–280. arXiv:math/0405229. doi:10.2307/3062156. JSTOR 3062156. S2CID 14960075.
- Martel, Yvan; Merle, Frank (2002). "Blow up in finite time and dynamics of blow up solutions for the $L$^{2}-critical generalized KdV equation". Journal of the American Mathematical Society. 15 (3): 617–665. doi:10.1090/S0894-0347-02-00392-2.
- Martel, Yvan; Merle, Frank (2004). "Review on blow up and asymptotic dynamics for critical and subcritical gKDV equations". Noncompact Problems at the Intersection of Geometry, Analysis, and Topology. Contemporary Mathematics. Vol. 350. pp. 157–177. doi:10.1090/conm/350/06344. ISBN 9780821836354.
- Martel, Yvan (2005). "Asymptotic N-soliton-like solutions of the subcritical and critical generalized Korteweg-de Vries equations". American Journal of Mathematics. 127 (5): 1103–1140. doi:10.1353/ajm.2005.0033. S2CID 121636286.
- Martel, Yvan (2006). "Linear Problems Related to Asymptotic Stability of Solitons of the Generalized KDV Equations". SIAM Journal on Mathematical Analysis. 38 (3): 759–781. doi:10.1137/050637510.
- Martel, Yvan; Merle, Frank; Tsai, Tai-Peng (2006). "Stability in $H^1$ of the sum of $K$ solitary waves for some nonlinear Schrödinger equations". Duke Mathematical Journal. 133 (3): 405–466. doi:10.1215/S0012-7094-06-13331-8. ISSN 0012-7094.
- Martel, Yvan; Merle, Frank (2007). "Asymptotic stability of solitons of the gKdV equations with general nonlinearity". Mathematische Annalen. 341 (2): 391–427. arXiv:0706.1174. Bibcode:2007arXiv0706.1174M. doi:10.1007/s00208-007-0194-z. ISSN 0025-5831. S2CID 17518506.
- Krieger, Joachim; Raphaël, Pierre; Martel, Yvan (2009). "Two-soliton solutions to the three-dimensional gravitational Hartree equation". Communications on Pure and Applied Mathematics. 62 (11): 1501–1550. arXiv:0811.3637. doi:10.1002/cpa.20292. S2CID 14888016.
- Martel, Yvan; Merle, Frank (2011). "Description of two soliton collision for the quartic gKDV equation". Annals of Mathematics. 174 (2): 757–857. arXiv:0709.2672. doi:10.4007/annals.2011.174.2.2. S2CID 115170654.
- Kenig, C.E.; Martel, Y.; Robbiano, L. (2011). "Local well-posedness and blow-up in the energy space for a class of $L^2$ critical dispersion generalized Benjamin–Ono equations". Annales de l'Institut Henri Poincaré C. 28 (6): 853–887. arXiv:1006.0122. Bibcode:2011AIHPC..28..853K. doi:10.1016/j.anihpc.2011.06.005. ISSN 0294-1449.
- Martel, Yvan; Merle, Frank (2011). "Review of long time asymptotics and collision of solitons for the quartic generalized Korteweg—de Vries equation". Proceedings of the Royal Society of Edinburgh, Section A. 141 (2): 287–317. doi:10.1017/S030821051000003X. S2CID 125047035.
