= Ralph Louis Cohen =

American mathematician

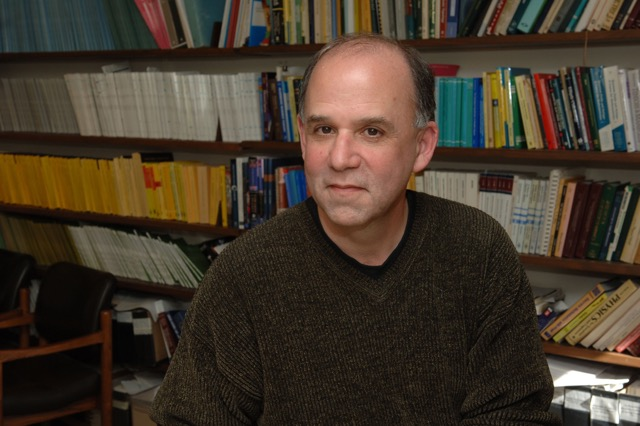
Ralph Louis Cohen

Ralph Louis Cohen (born 1952) is an American mathematician, specializing in algebraic topology and differential topology.

== Career ==
Cohen received his bachelor's degree from the University of Michigan in 1973 and his Ph.D. in 1978 from Brandeis University where he worked under the supervision of Edgar H. Brown, Jr. His thesis was titled On Odd Primary Stable Homotopy Theory and was published in the Memoirs of the American Mathematical Society. Cohen did his postdoctoral training as an L.E. Dickson Instructor at the University Chicago, and then became an Assistant Professor of Mathematics at Stanford University in 1980. In 1983, he became an Associate Professor and was promoted to Full Professor in 1987. In 2009 Cohen was awarded the distinguished chair, "The Barbara Kimball Browning Professor in the School of Humanities and Sciences". He was Chair of the Mathematics Department from 1992 to 1995, from 1999 to 2009 he was the Director of the Mathematics Research Center at Stanford. From 2010 to 2016 was the Senior Associate Dean for the Natural Sciences in the School of Humanities and Sciences.

Cohen has been a visiting professor at Princeton University, the University of Oxford, the University of Cambridge, Paris Diderot University, Paris 13 University, the University of Lille, and the University of Copenhagen. He was a founding editor of three prestigious mathematics journals: the Journal of Topology, the journal Geometry & Topology, and the Communications of the American Mathematical Society.

Cohen has been the Ph.D. supervisor to over 30 doctoral students, including Ulrike Tillmann, and Ernesto Lupercio.

== Research ==
In 1985, Cohen proved the Immersion Conjecture, which says that each smooth, compact n-manifold can be immersed into Euclidean space of dimension $2n - \alpha(n)$, where $\alpha(n)$ is the number of ones in the binary expansion of $n$. In 1991, Cohen, together with Frederick Cohen, Benjamin Mann, and R. James Milgram gave a complete description of the algebraic topology of the space of rational functions, and in the following years he made several contributions to the study of related moduli spaces. In 1995 Cohen, John D. S. Jones, and Graeme Segal introduced an approach for understanding the homotopy theory underlying Floer homology theory in Symplectic geometry. Since then, "Floer homotopy theory" has become an active area of research in the field. Since 2002 Cohen has been one of the developers and contributors to the theory of String topology, which was introduced originally by Moira Chas and Dennis Sullivan.

During his career, Cohen contributed greatly to mathematics education as well as to research. In 1995, Cohen was a founder of the Stanford University Math Camp (SUMaC), a summer camp for mathematically talented high school students. In 2002, Cohen received the Distinguished Teaching Award from Stanford University, and in 2005, he became a Bass Fellow in Undergraduate Education at Stanford. During the early 2000's, Cohen also co-authored a middle school textbook series published by McGraw-Hill.

== Awards ==
In 1982 Cohen was a Sloan Research Fellow. In 1983 he was an invited speaker at the International Congress of Mathematicians in Warsaw. In 1984 he received the Presidential Young Investigator Award. In 1988 he received an NSF International Award, in 2010 he served on the Executive Committee of the American Mathematical Society, and in 2012 he was elected a Fellow of the American Mathematical Society. Cohen was elected to the Board of Trustees of the American Mathematical Society in 2016.

== Selected publications ==
- Cohen, Ralph L. (1985). "The immersion conjecture for differentiable manifolds". Annals of Mathematics. 122 (2): 237–328. doi:10.2307/1971304. JSTOR 1971304. MR 0808220.
- Cohen, Frederick R.; Cohen, Ralph L.; Mann, Benjamin M.; Milgram, R. James (1991). "The topology of rational functions and divisors of surfaces". Acta Mathematica. 166 (3–4): 163–221. doi:10.1007/bf02398886. MR 1097023.
- Cohen, Ralph L.; Jones, John D. S.; Segal, Graeme (1995), "Floer's infinite dimensional Morse theory and homotopy theory", The Floer Memorial Volume, Progress in Mathematics, vol. 133, Birkhäuser Verlag, pp. 297–325, doi:10.1007/978-3-0348-9217-9_13, ISBN 978-3-0348-9948-2, MR 1362832
- Cohen, Ralph L.; Lupercio, Ernesto; Segal, Graeme B. (1999). "Holomorphic spheres in loop groups and Bott periodicity". Asian Journal of Mathematics. 3 (4): 801–818. doi:10.4310/ajm.1999.v3.n4.a5. MR 1797579.
- Cohen, Ralph L.; Jones, John D.S. (2002). "A homotopy theoretic realization of string topology". Mathematische Annalen. 324 (4): 773–798. arXiv:math/0107187. doi:10.1007/s00208-002-0362-0. MR 1942249. S2CID 16916132.
- A homotopy theoretic realization of string topology, (with John D.S Jones) Mathematische Annalen, vol. 324, 773-798 (2002)
- Cohen, Ralph L.; Jones, John D. S. (2016). "Gauge theory and string topology". Boletín de la Sociedad Matemática Mexicana. 23 (1): 233–255. arXiv:1304.0613. doi:10.1007/s40590-016-0134-6. MR 3633134. S2CID 118378937.
- with Kathryn Hess, Alexander A. Voronov: String Topology and Cyclic Homology, Birkhäuser 2006
- with Gunnar Carlsson: The What, Where and Why of Mathematics. A handbook for Teachers. 1991.
- with Gunnar Carlsson: Topics in Algebra. 1999.
