= William O. Beeman =

American scholar

William Beeman
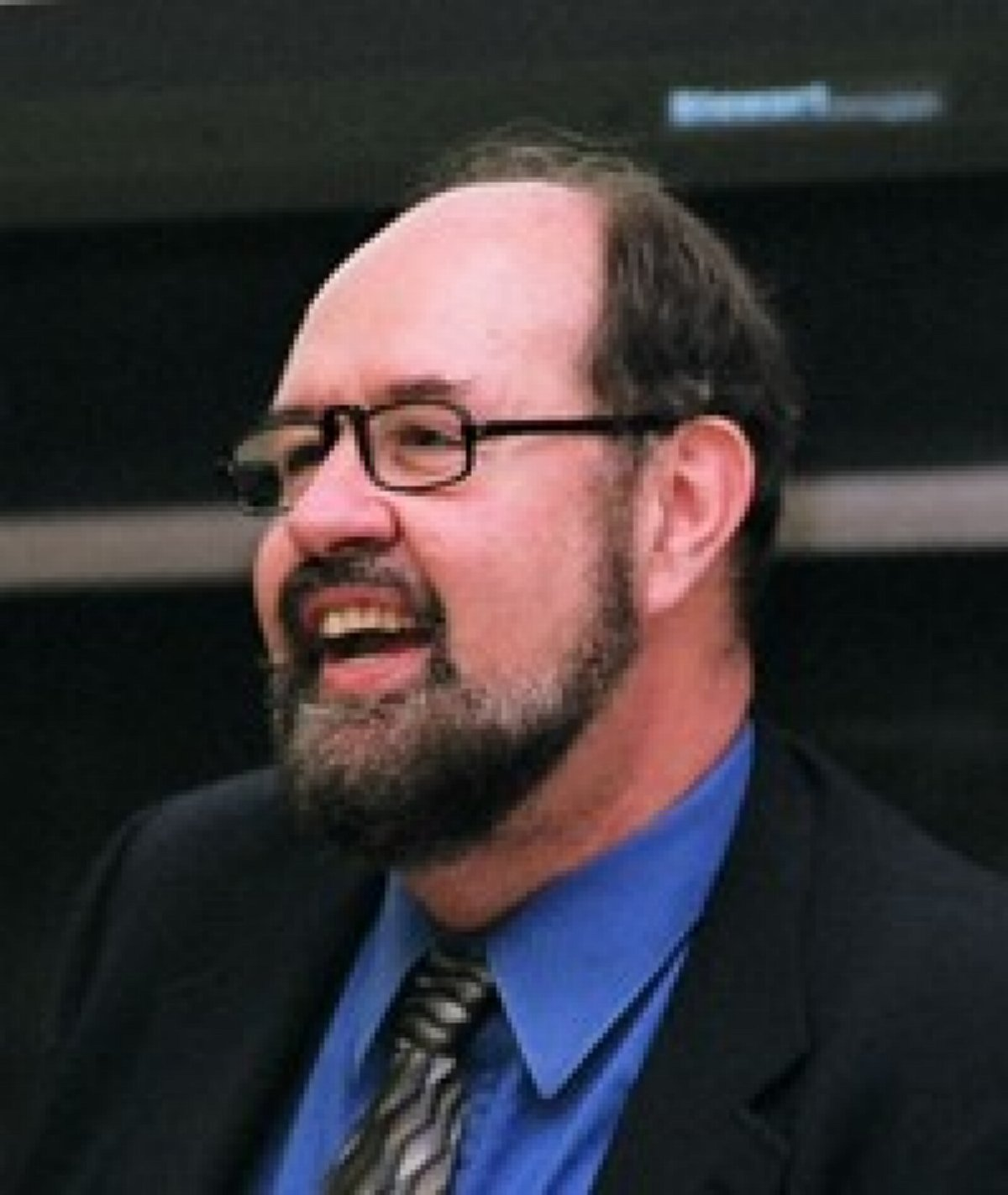
- Born: William Orman Beeman; April 1, 1947; Manhattan, Kansas, U.S.
- Other names: William Orman Beeman, W.O. Beeman
- Occupation: Professor Emeritus of Anthropology at the University of Minnesota
- Known for: Anthropology

William Orman Beeman is an American scholar whose specialty is the Middle East. He is Professor Emeritus of anthropology at the University of Minnesota, where he was Chair of the Department of Anthropology for 13 years until his retirement in 2020. He has authored many articles and fourteen books on Iranian politics, theatre, language, and culture.

== Biography ==
Born in Manhattan, Kansas, he grew up in Roeland Park, Kansas, and Tulsa, Oklahoma, where he graduated from Tulsa Central High School in 1964. In his final year of high school from 1963-64 he was an American Field Service exchange student in Detmold, Germany where he attended Leopoldinum II Gymnasium.

Beeman was trained as a linguistic anthropologist at Wesleyan University. He studied Anthropology at the University of Chicago starting in 1968, where he received his Master's degree in 1972 and his Ph.D. degree in 1976.

Beeman is Professor Emeritus of anthropology at the University of Minnesota, where he was Chair of the Department of Anthropology for 13 years until his retirement in 2000. For 34 years previous to his appointment in Minnesota he was Professor of Anthropology; Theatre, Speech and Dance; and East Asian Studies at Brown University. From 1976 until 1979, Beeman worked with the Center for Traditional Performing Arts in Tehran, and at Reza Shah Kabir University (now known as University of Mazandaran) in the Institute of Social and Cultural Sciences.

Beeman's study of Iranian sociolinguistics, Language, Status, and Power in Iran (1986) has become a classic work on Iranian linguistic usage, particularly the institution of ta'ārof, the ritual use of language to mark social hierarchy and politeness. His book, The "Great Satan" vs. the "Mad Mullahs": How the United States and Iran Demonize Each Other (2008), deals with the highly negative rhetoric and discourse between Iran and the United States over the three decades since the Iranian Revolution, and its effects on national attitudes toward the Bush administration's policy towards Iran, as well as the possibility of military conflict between the two nations. His publication, Iranian Performance Traditions treats indigenous performance traditions of Iran. An important aspect of Beeman's work has been in the field of performance studies, particularly the study of non-Western theatrical traditions. In Iran, this includes the Iranian ritual passion drama, ta'ziyeh and the comic improvisatory theatre tradition, ru-howzi.(see Persian theater) He has also studied traditional performance in Japan, China and South Asia. His interest in the art world is also shown in his contribution to the co-authored volume Object, Image and Inquiry: The Art Historian at Work. He also co-authored a study of opera performance technique with renowned opera stage director Daniel Helfgot, The Third Line: The Opera Performer as Interpreter.

An admirer of the late anthropologist, Margaret Mead, Beeman has edited seven volumes of her post-World War II papers, having written scholarly introductions for several of them, including The Study of Culture at a Distance, and Understanding Ourselves: Theory and Method in the Anthropology of Contemporary Western Society.

He is also a professional opera singer; from 1996 until 1999 he sang operatic bass in Europe. In 2014 he married Frank Farris; the two had been together since 1984.

== Publications ==
- Beeman, William O. (1982). Culture, Performance and Communication in Iran. Tokyo, Japan: Institute for the Study of Languages and Cultures of Asia & Africa. ASIN B0007B9HF6.
- Beeman, William O. (1986). Language, Status and Power in Iran. Advances in Semiology. Bloomington, Indiana: Indiana University Press. ISBN 978-0253331397.
- Beeman, William O. (2011). Iranian Performance Traditions. Bibliotheca Iranica: Performing Arts Series No. 9. Contra Costa, California: Mazda Publishers. ISBN 978-1568592169.
- Beeman, William O. (2008). The "Great Satan" vs. the "Mad Mullahs": How the United States and Iran Demonize Each Other. Chicago: University of Chicago Press. ISBN 978-0226041476.

== See also ==
- Persian theatre
