= Alberto Bressan =

Italian mathematician (born 1956)

- Born: 15 June 1956 (age 70); Venice, Italy
- Education: University of Padova; University of Colorado
- Awards: Feltrinelli Prize (2006), Bôcher Memorial Prize (2008)
- Scientific career
- Fields: Mathematics
- Workplaces: Penn State University
- Doctoral advisor: Jerrold Bebernes
- Doctoral students: Stefano Bianchini

Alberto Bressan (born 15 June 1956) is an Italian mathematician at Penn State University. His primary field of research is mathematical analysis including hyperbolic systems of conservation laws, impulsive control of Lagrangian systems, and non-cooperative differential games.

== Education and career ==
Bressan was born in Venice on 15 June 1956. After earning a laurea (the Italian equivalent of a master's degree) in 1978 from the University of Padua, he obtained his PhD in mathematics from the University of Colorado at Boulder under the supervision of Jerrold Bebernes in 1982.

After postdoctoral research at the University of Padua and the Mathematics Research Center of the University of Wisconsin-Madison, he became an associate professor at the University of Colorado at Boulder in 1986. Bressan received a full professorship at the SISSA in Trieste, Italy in 1991. In 2003, he moved to Penn State University to assume a full professorship there.

== Recognition ==
He won the Bôcher Memorial Prize in 2008 and the Analysis of Partial Differential Equations Prize of the SIAM in 2007 for his work in PDEs. He was appointed to the Eberly Family Chair in Mathematics at Penn State in September 2007.

In addition to the above, his honors include the A. Feltrinelli prize for Mathematics, Mechanics and Applications of the Accademia Nazionale dei Lincei in Rome. In 2012 he became a fellow of the American Mathematical Society.

Bressan was invited to give a plenary talk at the International Congress of Mathematicians at Beijing in August 2002.
