= Hoop conjecture =

Black hole conjecture

The hoop conjecture, proposed by Kip Thorne in 1972, states that an imploding object forms a black hole when, and only when, a circular hoop with a specific critical circumference could be placed around the object and rotated about its diameter. In simpler terms, the entirety of the object's mass must be compressed to the point that it resides in a perfect sphere whose radius is equal to that object's Schwarzschild radius; if this requirement is not met, then a black hole will not be formed. The critical circumference required for the imaginary hoop is given by the following equation listed below.

$$c=2\pi r_\text{s},$$

where

$c$ is the critical circumference;
$r_\text{s}$ is the object's Schwarzschild radius.

Thorne calculated the effects of gravitation on objects of different shapes (spheres, and cylinders that are infinite in one direction), and concluded that the object needed to be compressed in all three directions before gravity led to the formation of a black hole. With cylinders, the event horizon was formed when the object could fit inside the hoop described above. The mathematics to prove the same for objects of all shapes was too difficult for him at that time, but he formulated his hypothesis as the hoop conjecture.

By Penrose singularity theorem of 1964 it is known that if there is trapped null surface (and some other conditions) then a singularity must form, in 1983 Richard Schoen and Shing-Tung Yau proved how much matter must be crammed into a given volume to create a closed trapped surface, sometimes referred as the Schoen–Yau black hole existence theorem and more recently in 2023 using Mikhael Gromov's cube inequality some tori inequalities used in the results of 1983 have been generalized to cube ones that are more akin to Thorne's circular hoops.

== See also ==
- General relativity
- Bounding sphere
- Black hole stability conjecture
