= Charles Fefferman =

American mathematician (b. 1949)

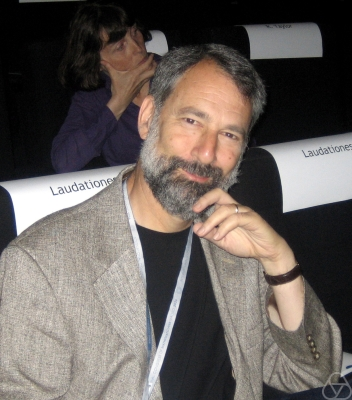
- Born: April 18, 1949 (age 77); Washington, D.C., U.S.
- Education: University of Maryland, College Park; Princeton University
- Awards: Alan T. Waterman Award (1976); Fields Medal (1978); Bergman Prize (1992) Bôcher Memorial Prize (2008); Wolf Prize (2017); BBVA Foundation Frontiers of Knowledge Award (2021)
- Scientific career
- Fields: Mathematics
- Workplaces: Princeton University, University of Chicago
- Thesis: Inequalities for Strongly Singular Convolution Operators (1969)
- Doctoral advisor: Elias Stein
- Doctoral students: Matei Machedon; Luis A. Seco

Charles Louis Fefferman (born April 18, 1949) is an American mathematician at Princeton University, where he is currently the Herbert E. Jones, Jr. '43 University Professor of Mathematics. He was awarded the Fields Medal in 1978 for his contributions to mathematical analysis.

Widely regarded as one of the most influential mathematical analysts of his generation, Fefferman has made foundational contributions across harmonic analysis, partial differential equations, several complex variables, and mathematical physics.

== Early life and education ==
Fefferman was born to a Jewish family, in Washington, DC. He was a child prodigy, entered the University of Maryland at age 14, (Note: Some sources say age 12.) and had written his first scientific paper by the age of 15. He graduated with degrees in math and physics at 17, and earned his PhD in mathematics three years later from Princeton University, under Elias Stein. His doctoral dissertation was titled "Inequalities for strongly singular convolution operators". Fefferman achieved a full professorship at the University of Chicago at the age of 22, making him the youngest full professor ever appointed in the United States.

== Career ==
At the age of 25, he returned to Princeton as a full professor, becoming the youngest person to be promoted to the title. He won the Alan T. Waterman Award in 1976 (the first person to get the award) and the Fields Medal in 1978 for his work in mathematical analysis, specifically convergence and divergence. He was elected to the National Academy of Sciences in 1979. He was appointed the Herbert Jones Professor at Princeton in 1984.

In addition to the above, his honors include the Salem Prize in 1971, the Bergman Prize in 1992, the Bôcher Memorial Prize in 2008, and the Wolf Prize in Mathematics for 2017, as well as election to the American Academy of Arts and Sciences and the American Philosophical Society. In 2021 he was awarded the BBVA Foundation Frontiers of Knowledge Award in Basic Sciences.

Fefferman contributed several innovations that revived the study of multidimensional complex analysis by finding fruitful generalisations of classical low-dimensional results. Fefferman's work on partial differential equations, Fourier analysis, in particular convergence, multipliers, divergence, singular integrals and Hardy spaces earned him a Fields Medal at the International Congress of Mathematicians at Helsinki in 1978. He was a Plenary Speaker of the ICM in 1974 in Vancouver.

His early work included a study of the asymptotics of the Bergman kernel off the boundaries of pseudoconvex domains in $\mathbb C^n$. He has studied mathematical physics, harmonic analysis, fluid dynamics, neural networks, geometry, mathematical finance and spectral analysis, amongst others.

== Family ==
Fefferman and his wife Julie have two daughters, Nina and Lainie. Lainie Fefferman is a composer, taught math at Saint Ann's School and holds a degree in music from Yale University and a Ph.D. in music composition from Princeton. She has an interest in Middle Eastern music. Nina Fefferman is a computational biologist at the University of Tennessee who studies the application of mathematical models to biological systems.

Fefferman's brother, Robert Fefferman, is also a mathematician and former Dean of the Physical Sciences Division at the University of Chicago. Fefferman is also the nephew of mathematician Abe Gelbart.

== Works ==
The following are among Fefferman's best-known papers:

- Fefferman, Charles (1970), "Inequalities for strongly singular convolution operators", Acta Mathematica, 124: 9–36, doi:10.1007/bf02394567
- Fefferman, Charles (1971), "The multiplier problem for the ball", Annals of Mathematics, 94 (2): 330–336, doi:10.2307/1970864, JSTOR 1970864
- Fefferman, C.; Stein, E. M. (1971), "Some maximal inequalities", American Journal of Mathematics, 93 (1): 107–115, doi:10.2307/2373450, JSTOR 2373450
- Fefferman, C.; Stein, E. M. (1972), "H^{p} spaces of several variables", Acta Mathematica, 129: 137–193, doi:10.1007/bf02392215
- Coifman, R.; Fefferman, C. (1974), "Weighted norm inequalities for maximal functions and singular integrals", Studia Mathematica, 51 (3): 241–250, doi:10.4064/sm-51-3-241-250
- Fefferman, Charles (1974), "The Bergman kernel and biholomorphic mappings of pseudoconvex domains", Inventiones Mathematicae, 26 (1): 1–65, Bibcode:1974InMat..26....1F, doi:10.1007/bf01406845, S2CID 125007742
- Fefferman, Charles L. (1983), "The uncertainty principle", Bulletin of the American Mathematical Society, 9 (2): 129–206, doi:10.1090/s0273-0979-1983-15154-6
- Donnelly, Harold; Fefferman, Charles (1983), "L^{2}-cohomology and index theorem for the Bergmann metric", Annals of Mathematics, 118 (3): 593–618, doi:10.2307/2006983, JSTOR 2006983
- Constantin, P.; Fefferman, C.; Majda, A. J. (1996), "Geometric constraints on potentially singular solutions for the 3-D Euler equations", Communications in Partial Differential Equations, 21 (3–4): 559–571, doi:10.1080/03605309608821197
- Fefferman, Charles (2005). "A sharp form of Whitney's extension theorem". Annals of Mathematics. 161 (1): 509–577. doi:10.4007/annals.2005.161.509. ISSN 0003-486X.
