= Johannes Sjöstrand =

Swedish mathematician

Johannes Sjöstrand (born 1947) is a Swedish mathematician, specializing in partial differential equations and functional analysis.

Sjöstrand received his doctorate in 1972 from Lund University under Lars Hörmander. Sjöstrand taught at the University of Paris XI and he is a professor at the University of Burgundy in Dijon.

He is a member of the Royal Swedish Academy of Sciences and, since 2017, a member of the American Academy of Arts and Sciences.

His research deals with microlocal analysis. He has investigated, inter alia, the Schrödinger equation of an electron in a magnetic field (with a spectrum of the Hofstadter butterfly), resonances in the semiclassical limit, and quantum tunneling in the semiclassical limit.

== Selected publications ==
- Operators of principal type with interior boundary conditions. Acta mathematica 130, no. 1 (1973): 1–51. doi:10.1007/BF02392261
- with Anders Melin: "Fourier integral operators with complex-valued phase functions." In Fourier integral operators and partial differential equations, pp. 120–223. Springer, Berlin, Heidelberg, 1975. doi:10.1007/BFb0074195
- with Richard Melrose: Singularities of boundary value problems. I, Comm. Pure Appl. Math., vol. 31, 1978, pp. 593–619 doi:10.1002/cpa.3160310504; Singularities of boundary value problems. II, Comm. Pure Appl. Math., vol. 35, 1982, pp. 129–168 doi:10.1002/cpa.3160350202
- with Melrose: A calculus for Fourier Integral Operators in domains with boundary and applications to the oblique dérivative problem, Comm. in PDE, 2, 1977, pp. 857–935, see Helffer Propagation des singularités pour des problèmes aux limites, Séminaire Bourbaki, Nr. 525, 1978/79
- with B. Lascar: Singularités analytiques microlocales, Astérisque 95, 1982
- with Bernard Helffer: Multiple wells in the semi-classical limit, Part 1, Communications in PDE, 9, 1984, 337–408 (6 parts altogether, see Robert Didier Analyse semi-classique de l'effet tunnel, Séminaire Bourbaki 665, 1985/86)
- with Helffer: Résonances en limite semi-classique, Mémoire SMF, Nr. 24–25, 1986
- with Helffer: Analyse semi-classique pour l'équation de Harper : (avec application à l'équation de Schrödinger avec champ magnétique), Mémoire SMF, Nr. 34, 1988, Nr. 39, 1989, Nr. 40, 1990 (Parts 1–3)
- Asymptotique des résonances pour des obstacles, Séminaire Bourbaki, Nr. 724, 1989/90
- with Helffer and P. Kerdelhué: Le papillon de Hofstadter revisité, Mémoire SMF, Nr. 43, 1990
- with Maciej Zworski: Complex scaling and the distribution of scattering poles, J. Amer. Math. Soc. 4, 1991, 729–769 doi:10.1090/S0894-0347-1991-1115789-9
- with Alain Grigis: Microlocal analysis for differential operators: an introduction, Cambridge University Press 1994.
- with Mouez Dimassi: Spectral asymptotics in the semi-classical limit, Cambridge University Press 1999
- with Maciej Zworski: Asymptotic distribution of resonances for convex obstacles. Acta Mathematica 183, no. 2 (1999): 191–253. doi:10.1007/BF02392828
- Microlocal Analysis, in: Jean-Paul Pier (ed.): Development of mathematics 1950–2000. Birkhäuser, 2000
- Complete asymptotics for correlations of Laplace integrals in the semi-classical limit, Paris, SMF 2000
- with Carlos E. Kenig and Gunther Uhlmann: "The Calderón problem with partial data." Annals of mathematics (2007): 567–591. JSTOR 20160036
