= Final state conjecture =

Conjecture in general relativity

The final state conjecture is that the end state of the universe will consist of black holes and gravitational radiation.

It was originally proposed by Roger Penrose in the 1980s, and is considered a central problem in mathematical general relativity.

== See also ==
- Black hole stability conjecture
