= Centre de mathématiques Laurent-Schwartz =

French mathematics laboratory

Centre de mathématiques Laurent-Schwartz (CMLS)
- Type: Government
- Established: 1965
- Founder: Laurent Schwartz
- Affiliations: CNRS; UMR (unité mixte de recherche} 7640
- Academic affiliations: École Polytechnique
- Director: Charles Favre
- Location: France; 48.713°N 2.209°E
- Campus: Essonne, Île-de-France
- Website: https://portail.polytechnique.edu/cmls/

The Centre de mathématiques Laurent-Schwartz (CMLS) is a joint research unit (UMR 7640) of France's Centre national de la recherche scientifique (CNRS) and the École Polytechnique. It is located on the site of École Polytechnique in Palaiseau.

== History of the Center ==
The École Polytechnique's first CNRS laboratory Laboratoire Leprince-Ringuet was created by Louis Leprince-Ringuet in 1936. Later, in 1958, Louis Michel founded in Essonne the Centre de physique théorique (Center for Theoretical Physics) and invited Laurent Schwartz to initiate a similar project for mathematics. In 1965, General Ernest Mahieux (1910–1967), the school's commander, gave Schwartz approval for both the budget and the location.

The Mathematics Center was officially established on May 1, 1965, with a Scientific Council composed of Laurent Schwartz, Pierre Samuel, François Bruhat and Jean-Pierre Kahane, and actually began its activity in 1966. The Center has always remained very close to the Centre de physique théorique, sharing with it secretariat, library and materials.

== Organization and activities of the unit ==
The unit is composed of three research teams: algebra and arithmetic; analysis and partial differential equations; and geometry and dynamics. The CMLS also actively participates in training through research: mathematical seminar days sponsored by the Union des Professeurs de classes préparatoires Scientifiques (UPS, Union of Science Preparatory Class Teachers) organized for teachers of preparatory classes, masters courses, and internship opportunities for the students of the École Polytechnique.

== Center Directors ==
- 1965–1983: Laurent Schwartz
- 1983–1990: Michel Demazure
- 1990–1994: Jean-Pierre Bourguignon
- 1994–2000: François Laudenbach
- 2000–2006: Claude Viterbo
- 2006–2012: Yves Laszlo
- 2012–2017: Yvan Martel
- Since 2017 : Charles Favre
