= Mark S. Joshi =

- Born: March 2, 1969; Dunblane, Scotland
- Died: 8 October 2017 (aged 48)
- Education: University of Oxford; Massachusetts Institute of Technology
- Spouse: Jane
- Children: 5
- Scientific career
- Workplaces: University of Cambridge; Royal Bank of Scotland; University of Melbourne
- Thesis: A Precise Calculus of Paired Lagrangian Distributions (1994)
- Doctoral advisor: Richard Burt Melrose
- Website: www.markjoshi.com

Mark Suresh Joshi (2 March 1969 – 8 October 2017) was a British researcher and consultant in mathematical finance. His last position was a professor at the University of Melbourne in Australia.

His research focused on derivatives pricing and interest rate derivatives in particular. He was the author of numerous research articles and seven books; his popular guides, "On becoming a quant" and "How to Get a Quant Job in Finance", are widely read.

== Early life and education ==
Joshi was born and grew up in Dunblane, Scotland.

He obtained a B.A. in mathematics from Hertford College, University of Oxford in 1990 (Top of year; recipient of the Oxford University Prize in Mathematics), and a Ph.D. in pure mathematics from the Massachusetts Institute of Technology in 1994 under the supervision of Richard Melrose.

== Career ==
He was an assistant lecturer in the department of pure mathematics and mathematical statistics at Cambridge University and a fellow of Darwin College from 1994 to 1999. During his time a Cambridge he continued his work on partial differential equations and microlocal analysis. This included a paper on polyhomogeneaift in semi-linear equations With Barretto he worked on recovering asymptotics of a Riemannian metric from scattering data. He also used microlocal methods in inverse boundary value problems for systems of PDEs, with McDowell he considered the recoveria of chiral electrimagnetic parameters from boundary data and with Lionheart recovering the metric from boundary data for the Laplacian on differential forms. Both used a method where the symbol of a pseudo differential operator was calculated up to a certain order in powers of a boundary normal coordinate, considerably simplifying the calculation.

Leaving academia he worked for the Royal Bank of Scotland, from 1999 to 2005 as a quantitative analyst at a variety of levels, finishing as the Head of Quantitative Research for Group Risk Management.

He joined the Centre for Actuarial Studies at the University of Melbourne in November 2005 as an associate professor, and was subsequently promoted to full professor. He taught the subject Financial Mathematics III and was also a highly sought after honours supervisor in the department.

== Bibliography ==
Mark Joshi wrote numerous research articles on quantitative finance, and also authored several books:

- four on mathematical finance
  - The Concepts and Practice of Mathematical Finance, 2003, second edition 2008
  - C++ Design Patterns and Derivatives Pricing, 2004, second edition 2008
  - More Mathematical Finance (published in September 2011)
  - Introduction to mathematical portfolio theory (published in July 2013).
- one on the quantitative finance job interview:
  - Quant Job Interview Questions And Answers, 2008, second edition 2013
- two on Mathematics:
  - Introduction to the Theory of Distributions (with F. G. Friedlander).
  - Proof Patterns, 2015

== Death ==
Joshi died of an unexpected heart attack in October 2017 at the age of 48, leaving behind his wife Jane and sons Alastair, Douglas, Colin, Richard and Stuart.
