= Stefano Bianchini =

Italian mathematician (born 1970)

- Born: 1970 (age 55–56)
- Education: International School for Advanced Studies
- Awards: EMS Prize (2004); Vinti Prize (2006)
- Scientific career
- Fields: Mathematics
- Doctoral advisor: Alberto Bressan

Stefano Bianchini (born 1970) is an Italian mathematician known for his research on partial differential equations. He won the 2004 EMS Prize for his contributions to the theory of discontinuous solutions of one-dimensional hyperbolic conservation laws.

Bianchini earned his PhD from the International School for Advanced Studies in 2000, under supervision of Alberto Bressan. Along with Bressan, he co-authored a paper that led to the solution of the long-standing problem of stability and convergence of vanishing viscosity approximations.
