= Matei Machedon =

Romanian–American mathematician

Matei Machedon (born 10 February 1960 in Romania) is a Romanian–American mathematician, specializing in partial differential equations and mathematical physics.

Machedon graduated from the University of Chicago with B.A./M.S. in 1982. He received his Ph.D. from Princeton University in 1986 with thesis advisor Charles Fefferman. Machedon was a C.L.E. Moore Instructor at Massachusetts Institute of Technology from 1986 to 1988. At Princeton University he was an assistant professor from 1988 to 1994. He was at the Institute for Advanced Study for the academic year 1994–1995. At the University of Maryland he was an associate professor from 1994 to 1998 and is since 1998 a full professor.

Machedon held a Sloan Fellowship for the academic year 1985–1986 and for the two academic years 1989–1991. He has frequently collaborated with Sergiu Klainerman and Manoussos Grillakis. In 1998 Machedon was an invited speaker at the International Congress of Mathematicians in Berlin.

== Selected publications ==
- Klainerman, S.; MacHedon, M. (1993). "Space-time estimates for null forms and the local existence theorem". Communications on Pure and Applied Mathematics. 46 (9): 1221–1268. doi:10.1002/cpa.3160460902. ISSN 0010-3640.
- Klainerman, S.; Machedon, M. (1994). "On the Maxwell-Klein-Gordon equation with finite energy". Duke Mathematical Journal. 74 (1): 19–44. doi:10.1215/S0012-7094-94-07402-4. ISSN 0012-7094.
- Klainerman, S.; Machedon, M. (1995). "Finite Energy Solutions of the Yang-Mills Equations in R^{3+1} ". The Annals of Mathematics. 142 (1): 39–119. doi:10.2307/2118611. ISSN 0003-486X. JSTOR 2118611.
- Klainerman, Sergeiu; Machedon, Matei (1996). "Estimates for null forms and the spaces H_{{s,δ}}". International Mathematics Research Notices. 1996 (17): 853–865. doi:10.1155/S1073792896000529. ISSN 1073-7928.
- Klainerman, Sergiu; Machedon, Matei (1996). "Remarks on Strichartz-type inequalities". International Mathematics Research Notices. 1996 (5): 201–220. doi:10.1155/S1073792896000153.
- Klainerman, S.; Machedon, M. (1996). "Smoothing estimates for null forms and applications". In Kuhn, Harold W.; Nirenberg, Louis; Sarnak, Peter (eds.). A Celebration of John F. Nash Jr. Duke University Press. pp. 99–133. ISBN 0822317826.
- Klainerman, Sergiu; Machedon, Matei (1997). "Wave maps". Duke Mathematical Journal. 87 (3): 553–589. doi:10.1215/S0012-7094-97-08718-4.
- Klainerman, Sergiu; Machedon, Matei (2008). "On the Uniqueness of Solutions to the Gross-Pitaevskii Hierarchy". Communications in Mathematical Physics. 279 (1): 169–185. arXiv:math-ph/0701006. Bibcode:2008CMaPh.279..169K. doi:10.1007/s00220-008-0426-4. S2CID 6582725.
- Grillakis, Manoussos G.; Machedon, Matei; Margetis, Dionisios (2010). "Second-Order Corrections to Mean Field Evolution of Weakly Interacting Bosons. I". Communications in Mathematical Physics. 294 (1): 273–301. arXiv:0904.0158. Bibcode:2010CMaPh.294..273G. doi:10.1007/s00220-009-0933-y. S2CID 6369451.
- Grillakis, M.; Machedon, M.; Margetis, D. (2011). "Second-order corrections to mean field evolution of weakly interacting Bosons. II". Advances in Mathematics. 228 (3): 1788–1815. arXiv:1003.4713. doi:10.1016/j.aim.2011.06.028. S2CID 115160091.
