= Frank Farris =

American mathematician

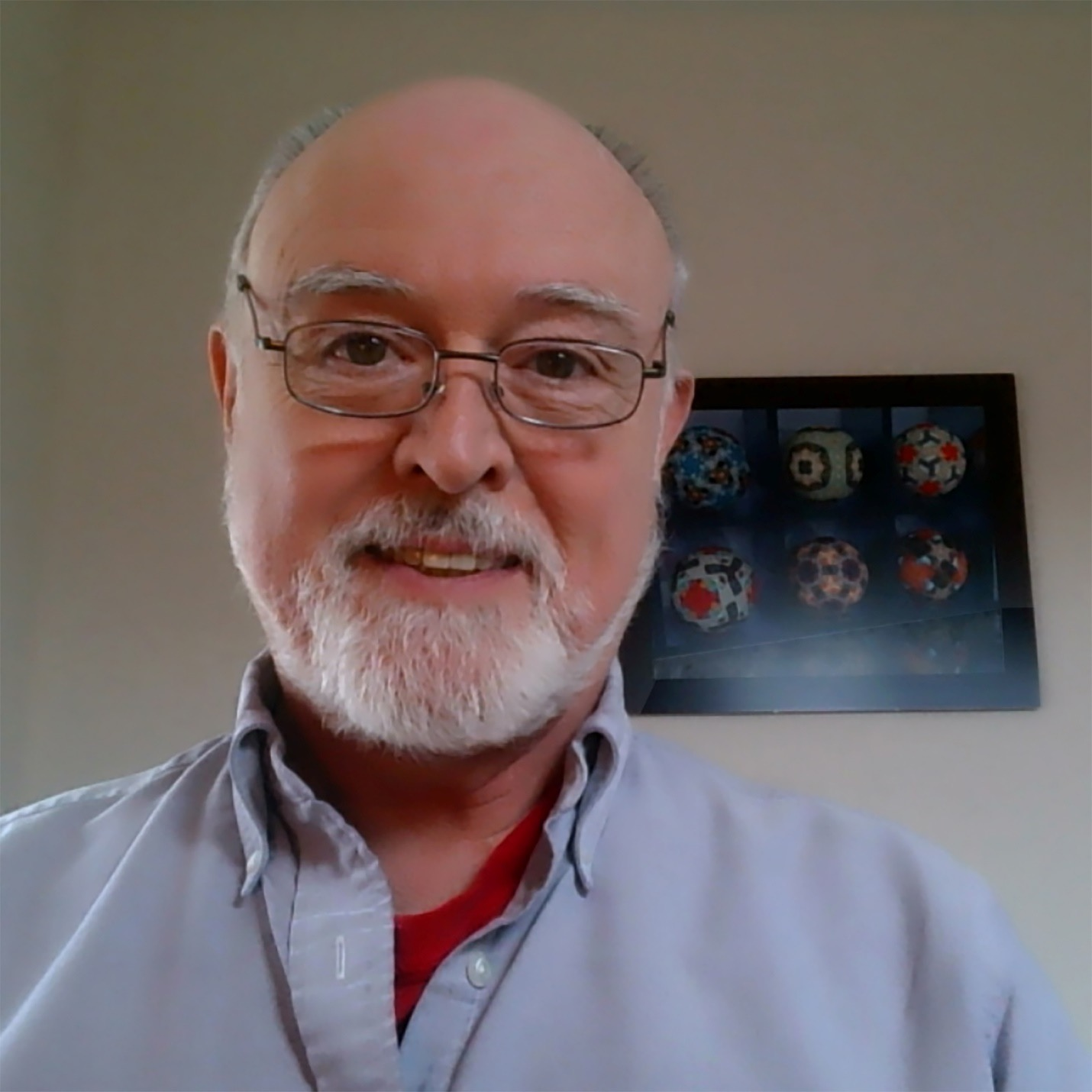
- Farris in 2021
- Born: Frank A. Farris; Santa Monica, California, U.S.
- Education: Massachusetts Institute of Technology
- Known for: Visual mathematics
- Spouse: William O. Beeman
- Awards: Trevor Evans Award, Alpha Sigma Nu Book Award
- Scientific career
- Fields: Symmetry
- Workplaces: Santa Clara University
- Thesis: Spiralling Chains in CR Manifolds
- Doctoral advisor: Richard Burt Melrose
- Website: www.scu.edu/cas/mathcs/faculty-and-staff/frank-farris

Frank A. Farris is an American mathematician. He is a professor of Mathematics and Computer Science at Santa Clara University. He is also an editor, author, and artist whose work concerns mathematical topics. Farris is known primarily for mathematical exposition, his creation of visual mathematics through computer science, and advocacy for mathematical art as a discipline.

== Education ==
Farris was born in Santa Monica, California. Shortly after his birth, his family moved to Covina, a suburb of Los Angeles. He showed interest and proficiency in a large variety of subjects such as astronomy. At age 15, he enrolled in the NSF summer science training program, designed to enrich mathematical talent in America.

Farris studied mathematics as an undergraduate at Pomona College and received his Ph.D. at the Massachusetts Institute of Technology. His dissertation Spiralling Chains in CR Manifolds was supervised by Richard Burt Melrose. His time at MIT led him to pursue pure mathematics with a focus on geometry.

== Career ==
Farris taught at Brown University for three years, before becoming an assistant professor in Santa Clara University in 1984. He was tenured and promoted to associate professor in 1988 and was promoted to full professor in 2017. He was awarded the Award for Distinguished College or University Teaching by the Golden Section of the Mathematical Association of America (MAA) in 2018.

Farris was the editor of Mathematics Magazine from 2001 to 2005, and then again in 2009. His article "The Edge of the Universe" for Math Horizons received the Trevor Adams Award from the MAA.

In 2015, his book Creating Symmetry: The Artful Mathematics of Wallpaper Patterns, which conveys his artistic method, was published by the Princeton University Press. It was awarded the PROSE Award in Mathematics from the Association of American Publishers, Honorable Mention, in 2016, and the Alpha Sigma Nu Book Award in 2018. It is profiled in numerous periodicals including Quanta and Scientific American.

== Work method ==
Farris generates organic mathematical art using symmetry, patterns, and wave functions. He commonly works with wallpaper patterns using photographs as source material. The wallpaper often exhibit translational symmetry across two independent axes. He has created work that gives the illusion of five-fold rotational symmetry in the Wallpaper group. His award-winning artwork has been profiled by the American Mathematical Society,

He promotes a visual and computational perspective of math through his art, seminars, writing, etc. typically aimed towards undergraduates and mathematicians.

== LGBTQIA+ Community ==
Farris is an active member of the LGBTQIA+ community. He has worked for the advancement of LGBTQIA+ mathematicians, for instance, in the formation of Spectra (mathematical association). In 2014, he married William O. Beeman; they had been a couple since 1984. In 2021, he was profiled in the podcast "Count Me In with Della and Deanna".
