= Bernard Helffer =

French mathematician (born 1949)

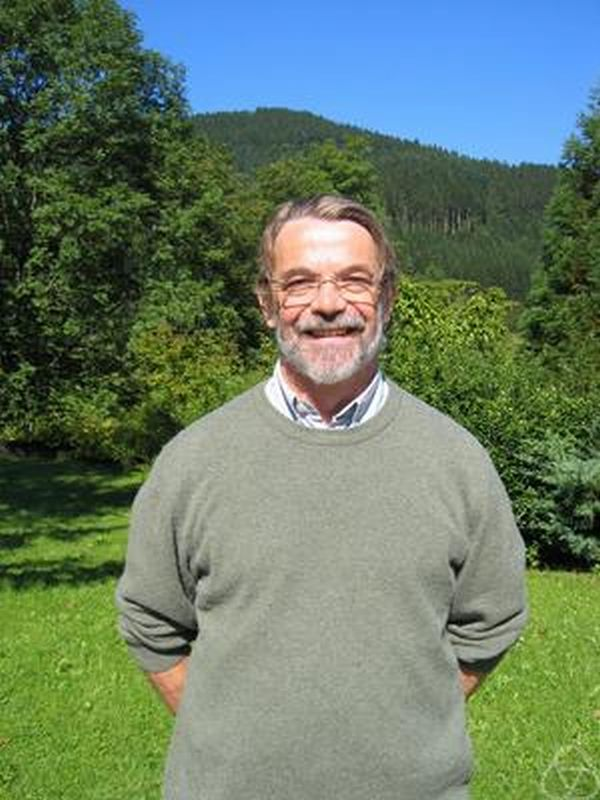
Bernard Helffer, Oberwolfach 2005

Bernard Helffer (born 8 January 1949, Paris) is a French mathematician, specializing in partial differential equations, spectral theory, and mathematical physics.

He is the son of the pianist Claude Helffer and the musicologist Mireille Helffer. Helffer studied from 1968 at the École Polytechnique and received in 1976 from the University of Paris-Sud his doctorate under Charles Goulaouic with dissertation Hypoellipticité pour des classes d'opérateurs pseudodifférentiels à caractéristiques multiples. From 1971 to 1978 he did research at CNRS, from 1978 to 1989 he was a professor at the University of Nantes, and then he was a professor at the University Paris-Sud (and simultaneously taught for five years at the École Normale Superieure).

His research in mathematical physics deals with statistical mechanics, liquid crystals, superconductivity, semiclassical approximation, and ground-state nodal lines in Laplace operators and Schrödinger operators.

The French Academy of Sciences awarded Helffer in 1991 the Prix Langevin and in 2011 the Prix de l'État.

Helffer was from 1974 to 1978 the Secretary of the CNRS Mathematics Commission and from 1999 to 2004 a consultant for mathematics at the French Ministry of Education. From 2010 to 2012 he was the President of the Société mathématique de France.

== Selected publications ==
- with Louis Boutet de Monvel and Alain Grigis: Parametrixes d'opérateurs pseudo-différentiels a caractéristiques multiples, Astérisque 34–35, 1976, pp. 93–121
- with Jean Nourrigat: Hypoellipticité maximale pour des opérateurs polynomes de champs de vecteurs, Birkhäuser 1985
- with Johannes Sjöstrand: Résonances en limite semi-classique, Mémoire SMF, Nr. 24–25, 1986
- Semi-classical analysis for the Schrödinger operator and applications, Springer 1988
- with Sjöstrand and P. Kerdelhué: Le papillon de Hofstadter revisité, Mémoire SMF, Nr. 43, 1990
- with Maria Hoffmann-Ostenhof, Thomas Hoffmann-Ostenhof, and Mark Owen: Nodal sets for groundstates of Schrödinger operators with zero magnetic field in non-simply connected domains, Comm. Math. Phys. 202 (1999), no. 3, 629–649. doi:10.1007/s002200050599
- with Abderemane Morame: "Magnetic bottles in connection with superconductivity." Journal of Functional Analysis 185, no. 2 (2001): 604–680. doi:10.1006/jfan.2001.3773
- Semiclassical analysis, Witten Laplacians, and statistical mechanics, World Scientific 2002
- with Francis Nier: Hypoelliptic estimates and spectral theory for Fokker-Planck operators and Witten Laplacians, Springer 2005
- with S. Fournais: Spectral Methods in Surface Superconductivity, Birkhäuser 2010
- Spectral Theory and its Applications, Cambridge Studies in Advanced Mathematics 139, 2013
