= John Edmark =

American designer, sculptor

John Edmark (born 1965) is an American designer, sculptor, and professor at Stanford University. Many of his art works take on a mathematical approach and application.

== Education and career ==
Edmark graduated from Columbia University with a Bachelor of Science and later a Master of Science degree in Computer Science. He then received a second Master of Science degree in Product Design at Stanford University. Throughout his life, he has acquired supplemental knowledge on architecture, art, and animation that can be reflected in his artwork. His curiosities in mathematics — specifically spiral geometry — have also played a large influence on his art.

Edmark worked at Bell Labs for a few years researching computer graphics and virtual environments. However, he cites that he preferred to create physical, tangible objects rather than virtual objects, which ultimately inspired him to create sculptures.

Currently, Edmark is a professor at Stanford University, where he lectures on topics such as design, art history, and mechanical engineering. Edmark has also since created commissioned artwork for the Exploratorium, San Jose Museum of Art, Phaeno Science Center, and Swiss Science Center Technorama.

== Works ==
Edmark has been praised for his mathematical approach to art. One of his main goals is to strike curiosity and wonder in the observers. Much of his work is constructed based on intricate mathematical processes, as he describes his sculptures as “instruments that amplify our awareness of the sometimes tenuous relationship between facts and perception."

One of his main focuses is on spiraling sculptures that create a blooming effect when spun and placed under a strobe light, similar to how zoetropes function. These "bloom" sculptures utilize mathematical patterns such as phyllotactic spirals and symmetry, which are both a part of spiral geometry. His blooms, in particular, are inspired by mathematical processes occurring in nature, such as with pinecones and artichokes. The petals of his "bloom" sculptures are placed 137.5° (golden angle) apart — based on properties from the golden ratio and the Fibonacci Sequence — in order to create the spiral effect when spun. His sculptures are 3D printed and are composed mostly of plywood, polypropylene, and brass. Edmark also creates animations based on these structures through taking a picture every 137.5° rotation.

Other than his blooms, many of his sculptures are based on similar idea of spirals. For example, he has created a helicone, which is a wooden model replicating DNA strands that can be rotated by 68.75°. His ''Fibonacci Tiling'' (2016) is a set of tiles that have pieces of similar shapes, but each tile is different in size. The illusion of the sculpture spinning is created when pieces are added quickly.
