= Anne-Laure Dalibard =

French mathematician

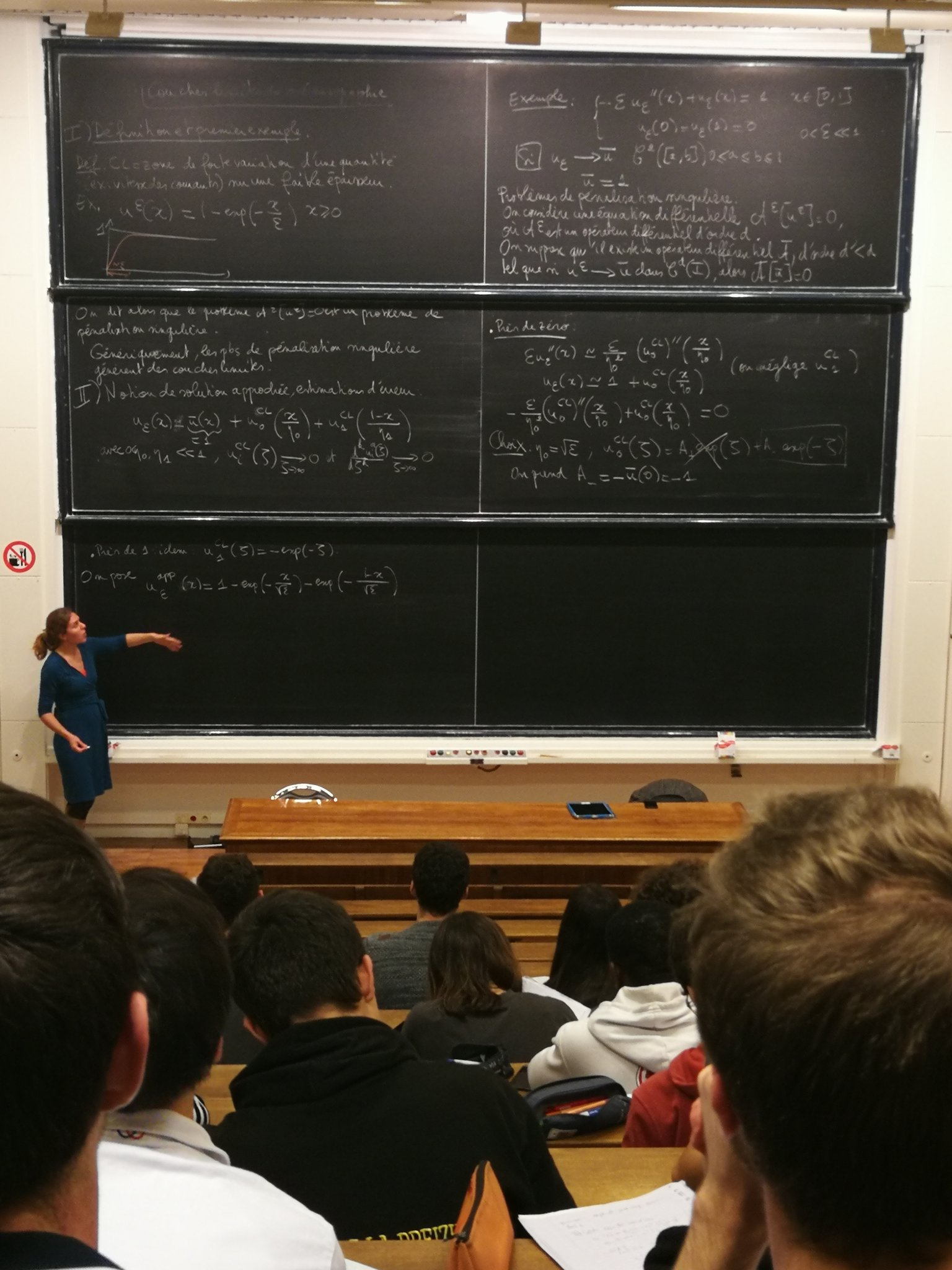
- Education: École Normale Supérieure
- Known for: Geophysical fluid dynamics
- Scientific career
- Workplaces: Sorbonne University; Courant Institute of Mathematical Sciences
- Website: Anne-Laure Dalibard

Anne-Laure Dalibard is a French mathematician working on asymptotic behavior of fluid equations occurring in oceanographic models. She works as a staff scientist at the Jacques-Louis Lions Laboratory, a joint research unit between Sorbonne University and the French National Centre for Scientific Research (UMR 7598.)

== Education and career ==
Dalibard earned her PhD from Sorbonne University, working on the homogenization of scalar conservation laws and transport equations under the supervision of Fields Medal laureate Pierre-Louis Lions.

== Awards and honours ==
- 2023 Mathematics medal of the French Academy of Sciences
- 2020 Société Mathématique de France Maurice Audin Prize
- 2018 CNRS bronze medal
- 2015 European Research Council starting grant
- 2010 College de France Peccot Prize
