= Rafe Mazzeo =

American mathematician

- Born: 1961 (age 64–65); Boston, Massachusetts, US
- Education: MIT
- Awards: Sloan Research Fellowship (1991-1995)
- Scientific career
- Fields: Mathematics
- Workplaces: Stanford University
- Thesis: Hodge cohomology of negatively curved manifolds (1986)
- Doctoral advisor: Richard Burt Melrose

Rafe Roys Mazzeo (born 1961) is an American mathematician working in differential geometry, microlocal analysis, and partial differential equations. He is currently a professor of mathematics. He served as the department chair at Stanford University from 2007 to 2010 and 2019–2022.

== Education and career ==
Mazzeo obtained his B.S. degree from MIT in 1982. He completed his Ph.D. in mathematics at MIT under the supervision of Richard Burt Melrose in 1986. His Ph.D. thesis was titled "Hodge cohomology of negatively curved manifolds." After obtaining his Ph.D. degree, Mazzeo joined Stanford University, where he became a full professor in 1997.

== Contributions ==
Mazzeo has published more than 150 mathematics papers, and his work has been cited more than 5000 times. His work has been published in many prestigious mathematics journals, including Annals of Mathematics, Inventiones Mathematicae, and Duke Mathematical Journal. He has had 11 doctoral students. He is one of the founders of the Stanford University Mathematics Camp. He is Faculty Director of the Stanford Online High School, and has been Director of the IAS/Park City Mathematics Institute since 2015.

== Awards and fellowships ==
Mazzeo has received many awards, including a National Science Foundation Postdoctoral Fellowship, Alfred P. Sloan Foundation Research Fellowship, National Science Foundation Young Investigator Fellowship, and Louis and Claude Rosenberg Jr. University Fellowship in Undergraduate Education.

In 2013, he became a fellow of the American Mathematical Society. He was elected as a Member of the American Academy of Arts and Sciences in 2022.

== Selected publications ==
- Mazzeo, Rafe; Rubinstein, Yanir; Jeffres, Thalia (2016). "Kähler–Einstein metrics with edge singularities". Annals of Mathematics. 183: 95–176. arXiv:1105.5216. doi:10.4007/annals.2016.183.1.3. S2CID 119306806.
- Mazzeo, Rafe; Pacard, Frank; Schoen, Richard; Korevaar, Nick (1999). "Refined asymptotics for constant scalar curvature metrics with isolated singularities". Inventiones Mathematicae. 135 (2): 233–272. arXiv:math/9807038. Bibcode:1999InMat.135..233K. doi:10.1007/s002220050285. S2CID 5536612.
- Mazzeo, Rafe; Hausel, Tamás; Hunsicker, Eugenie (2004). "Hodge cohomology of gravitational instantons". Duke Mathematical Journal. 122 (3): 485–548. arXiv:math/0207169. doi:10.1215/S0012-7094-04-12233-X. S2CID 14883967.
- Mazzeo, Rafe (1991). "Elliptic theory of differential edge operators I". Communications in Partial Differential Equations. 16 (10): 1615–1664. doi:10.1080/03605309108820815.
- Mazzeo, Rafe; Melrose, Richard (1987). "Meromorphic extension of the resolvent on complete spaces with asymptotically constant negative curvature". Journal of Functional Analysis. 75 (2): 260–310. doi:10.1016/0022-1236(87)90097-8.
- Mazzeo, Rafe; Epstein, Charles (2013). Degenerate Diffusion Operators Arising in Population Biology. Princeton University Press. ISBN 978-0691157122.
