= Richard Burt Melrose =

Australian mathematician

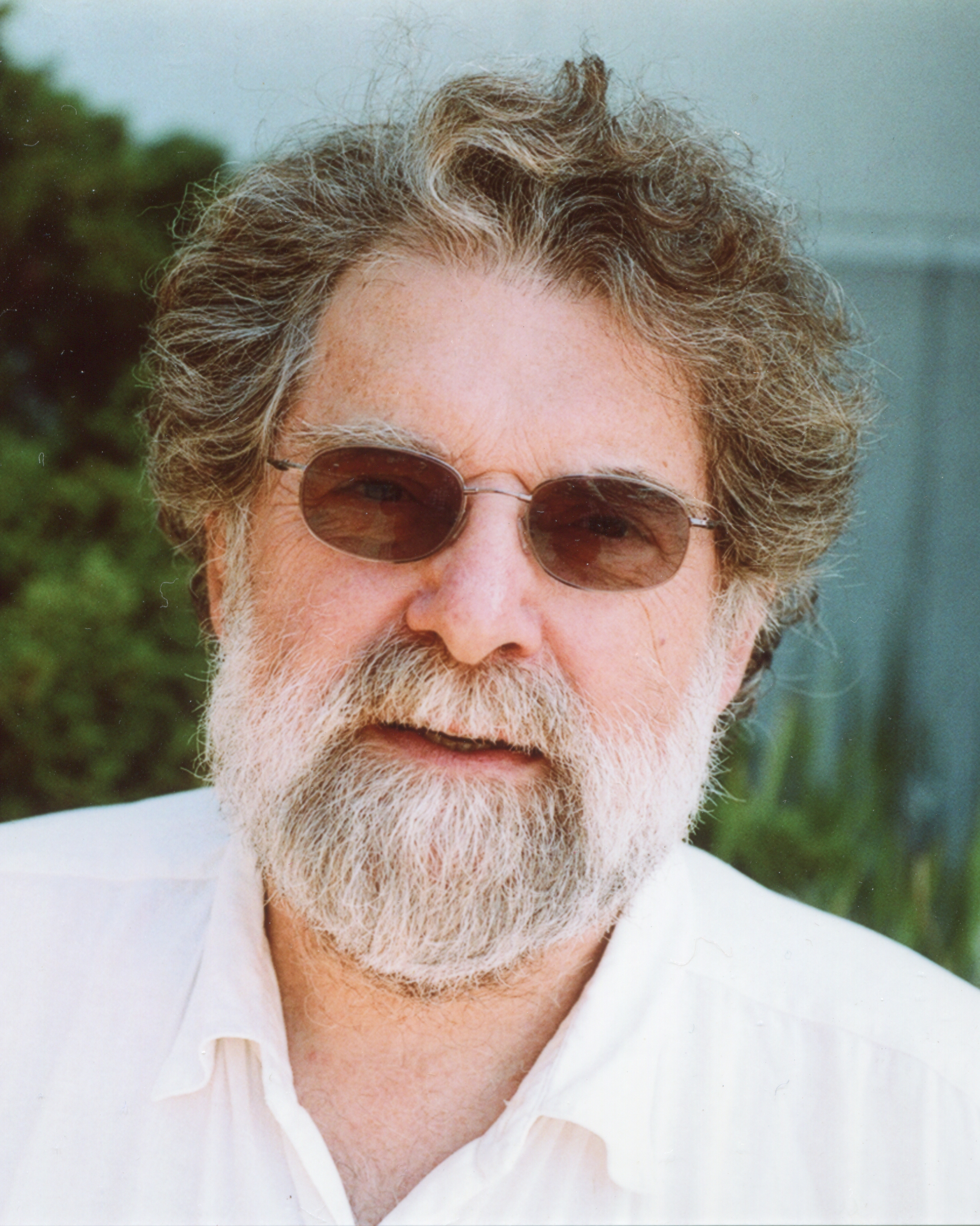
- Melrose at Berkeley in 2008
- Education: University of Cambridge
- Scientific career
- Workplaces: Massachusetts Institute of Technology
- Thesis: Initial and Initial Boundary Value Problems (1974)
- Doctoral advisor: Frederick Gerard Friedlander
- Doctoral students: Frank Farris; Mark S. Joshi; John M. Lee; Rafe Mazzeo; András Vasy; Jared Wunsch; Maciej Zworski

Richard Burt Melrose is an Australian mathematician and emeritus professor at the Massachusetts Institute of Technology who works on geometric analysis, partial differential equations, and differential geometry.

== Education ==
Melrose received in 1974 his Ph.D. from Cambridge University under F. Gerard Friedlander with thesis Initial and Initial-Boundary Value Problems.

== Career ==
Melrose became a research fellow at St John's College, Cambridge. In 1977 he was a visiting scholar at the Institute for Advanced Study. Since 1976 he has been a professor at MIT, where since 2006 he has been the Simons Professor of Mathematics. From 1999 to 2002 he was the chair of the committee for pure mathematics at MIT.

His doctoral students include Mark S. Joshi, John M. Lee, Rafe Mazzeo, András Vasy, and Maciej Zworski.

== Awards ==
In 1984 Melrose received the Bôcher Memorial Prize for his work on scattering theory. Since 1986 he has been a Fellow of the American Academy of Arts and Sciences. For the academic year 1992–1993 he was a Guggenheim Fellow. He was in 1978 an invited speaker (Singularities of solutions of boundary value problems) at the ICM in Helsinki and in 1990 a plenary speaker (Pseudodifferential operators, corners and singular limits) at the ICM in Kyoto.

== Selected publications ==
=== Articles ===
- with Shahla Marvizi: Marvizi, S.; Melrose, R. B. (1982). "Some spectrally isolated convex planar regions". Proc Natl Acad Sci U S A. 79 (22): 7066–7067. Bibcode:1982PNAS...79.7066M. doi:10.1073/pnas.79.22.7066. PMC 347276. PMID 16593254.

=== Books ===
- as editor with Michael Beals, Jeffrey Rauch: Microlocal analysis and nonlinear waves. Springer. 1991. ISBN 0387975918.
- The Atiyah-Patodi-Singer Index theorem. A.K.Peters. 1993. ISBN 978-1-56881-002-7.
- Geometric Scattering Theory. Cambridge University Press. 1995. ISBN 9780521498104.
- with Antônio Sá Barreto, Maciej Zworski: Semi-linear diffraction of conormal waves. Astérisque, 0303 : 240. Société Mathématique de France; distributed by American Mathematical Society. 1996.
- with András Vasy, Jared Wunsch, Diffraction of Singularities for the Wave Equation on Manifolds with Corners. Société mathématique de France. 2013. ISBN 9782856293676.
