= Igor Rodnianski =

American mathematician (born 1972)

- Born: April 28, 1972 (age 54)
- Education: Kansas State University
- Awards: Clay Mathematics Institute Long-term Prize (2002); Fermat Prize (2011); Simons Investigator Award (2017); Bôcher Memorial Prize (2023); Clay Research Award (2023)
- Scientific career
- Fields: Partial differential equations, mathematical physics, and general relativity
- Workplaces: Princeton University
- Thesis: Pseudoholomorphic Curves in Almost Complex Manifolds (1999)
- Doctoral advisor: Lev Vil'evich Kapitanskii

Igor Rodnianski (born April 28, 1972, Ukrainian SSR, Soviet Union) is an American mathematician at Princeton University. He works in partial differential equations, mathematical physics, and general relativity.

== Life ==
Rodnianski studied at the University of Saint Petersburg, graduating in Physics in 1996. He graduated in 1999 from Kansas State University.

== Career ==
Igor Rodnianski became an instructor at Princeton in 1999. He was promoted to associate professor before 2004. In 2005, Dr. Rodnianski wrote paper on rough solutions to the historical Einstein Vacuum Equation with S. Klainerman.

He became full professor at Princeton in 2005. In 2011, he moved to the Massachusetts Institute of Technology. In the Spring of 2011, he became the Henry Burchard Fine Professor of Mathematics at Princeton University.

== Work ==
Prof. Rodnianski specializes in hyperbolic partial differential equations related to fundamental problems of mathematics. His work has its basis in geometry, analysis, and mathematical physics. In 2002 he received the Long-Term Prize fellowship of the Clay Mathematics Institute, and in 2010 the Distinguished Alumnus Award from Kansas State University. He received the 2011 Fermat Prize for Mathematical Research, "for fundamental contributions to the study of equations of general relativity and the propagation of light in curved space-times (with M. Dafermos, S. Klainerman, H. Lindblad)." In 2017, he received a Simons Investigator Award. In 2023 he was awarded the Bôcher Memorial Prize of the AMS. Also in 2023 he received the Clay Research Award.
