= Education Program for Gifted Youth =

Education Program for Gifted Youth at Stanford University
- Stanford University; California; United States

Information
- Established: 1990
- Closed: 2018
- Information: e-learning courses for gifted and talented students
- Website: http://epgy.stanford.edu/

The Education Program for Gifted Youth (EPGY) at Stanford University was a loose collection of gifted education programs formerly located within Stanford Pre-Collegiate Studies program. EPGY included distance and residential summer courses for students of all ages. Many of the courses were distance learning, meaning that courses were taught remotely via the Internet, rather than in the traditional classroom setting. Courses targeted students from elementary school up to advanced college graduate. Subjects offered included: Mathematics, English, Humanities, Physics, and Computer Science. Stanford Pre-Collegiate Studies is similar to the Center for Talented Youth at the Johns Hopkins University in terms of certain objectives. The EPGY courses themselves were offered by a number of institutions, including Stanford and Johns Hopkins.

In 2015, EPGY was separated from Stanford University as its own entity known as GiftedandTalented.com. As of July 1, 2018, the service was discontinued.

== Background ==
In the early 1960s, Stanford professors Patrick Suppes and Richard C. Atkinson began researching whether computers could be effectively used in schools to teach math and reading to children. At the time, their area of research was known as "computer-assisted instruction" (CAI). Atkinson eventually left to pursue a career as an administrator (he would retire as president of the University of California), but Suppes stayed. Later Suppes extended his research to college-level material, and computer-based courses in Logic and Set Theory were offered to Stanford undergraduates from 1972 to 1992.

== History ==
In 1985, Suppes received a "proof of concept" grant from the National Science Foundation to develop a computerized first-year calculus course with the initial objective of making it available to students in their last year of high school who were at schools that did not otherwise offer calculus. Suppes, together with a team that included Raymond Ravaglia, the former executive director of EPGY, began work on the course in earnest in 1987. When the course was ready for testing in 1990, the focus was turned to younger students who had been accelerated in their mathematics educations. For the summer of 1990, approximately 40 junior high and high school students with some knowledge of algebra were selected for a five-week instructor-taught accelerated precalculus course at Foothill College. Of those students, thirteen located at seven local schools were invited to take the computer-based calculus course during the subsequent school year, 1990–91. All thirteen took the Advanced Placement AB Calculus examination in May 1991. Six students scored 5, six scored 4, and one scored 3.

Following this initial success, computer-based courses in Beginning Algebra, Intermediate Algebra, and Precalculus were created to replace the accelerated summer course. These courses were tested during the 1991–92 academic year with a new group of students. At the same time, the calculus course was expanded to include the material necessary for the BC examination. That year four students took the BC examination, with all scoring 5. Subsequently, in 1992, Stanford Physics Professor Mason Yearian, together with Jose Acacio de Barros, started developing AP Physics courses, starting with Physics C: Mechanics. The first Physics C class started in December 1992, and four students score 5, four scored 4, and one scored 3.

After porting the software to the Windows operating system, the Stanford Pre-Collegiate Studies, then known as the Education Program for Gifted Youth (EPGY), was formally launched at Stanford University in fall 1992, making these courses generally available.

In Fall 2000, the idea emerged of creating academic camps that would provide opportunities for enrichment that complement the opportunities for acceleration in the standard curriculum offered through online courses. The following year, the Summer Institute in Math and Physics (SIMP) was launched with courses in the Theory of Relativity taught by Gary Oas and Real Analysis taught by Marc Sanders. Building on the success of this first year, it expanded to 170 students in the second year. In addition to courses in math and physics, courses in computer programming and writing (including creative writing taught by a recipient of Stanford's very competitive Wallace Stegner Fellowship for emerging writers) were added to the offerings of the program, which was renamed the Summer Institutes. Originally only for high school students, the Summer Institutes added a middle school program in 2005.

In April 2006, Stanford received a private donation from the Malone Family Foundation of Englewood, Colorado, which funded the establishment of an online high school independent of EPGY's regular distance learning courses. Its formal name is the Stanford University Online High School, but is often referred to as Stanford OHS, or simply OHS.

In 2013, EPGY individualized online courses became offered through Redbird Advanced Learning.

In 2016, Redbird Advanced Learning, formerly EPGY, was acquired by McGraw-Hill Education.

In 2018, EPGY's successor, known at the time as GiftedAndTalented.com, was closed and the courseware was discontinued.

== Stanford Pre-Collegiate Institutes ==
The Stanford Pre-Collegiate Studies program currently hosts several residential summer programs for high school students ages 14–17, including the Summer Institutes, the Summer Humanities Institute, the Stanford University Mathematics Camp, the Stanford Medical Youth Science program, and the Summer Arts Institute.

=== Summer Institutes ===
Stanford Pre-Collegiate Studies Summer Institutes are three-week residential programs for academically talented and motivated high school students. The Summer Institutes provide an opportunity for these students to enrich and accelerate their academic pursuits and to meet others who share their interests and abilities. Past Summer Institutes participants have come from over 80 countries and all 50 states.

Summer Institutes participants live in supervised Stanford housing and are taught by Stanford instructors. Students engage in intensive study in a single course, and they are introduced to topics not typically presented at the high-school level. The Summer Institutes provide a taste of college life in the beautiful surroundings of the Stanford campus.

Summer Institutes subject areas include mathematics, science, writing, humanities, computer science, engineering and business. The instructors are assisted by undergraduate and graduate student mentors who have expertise in the course subject areas. These mentors serve a dual role of Residential Counselor and Teaching Assistant so that the academic and social aspects of the program are tightly integrated.

=== Summer Humanities Institute ===
The Summer Humanities Institute is a three-week residential program for rising juniors and seniors interested in the humanities. Led by Stanford professors, the Summer Humanities Institute offers intensive courses in history, philosophy, and literature.

=== Summer staff ===
The Summer Institute hires undergraduates, recent graduates, and graduate students to work during each summer as counselors and teaching assistants. Residential Counselors (RCs) are selected for their ability to work with young people in a residential setting, and for their academic qualifications. This arrangement allows for the social and academic portions of the program to be tightly integrated.

== Notable alumni ==
- Emmy Rossum
