= Maciej Zworski =

Polish-Canadian mathematician (born 1963)

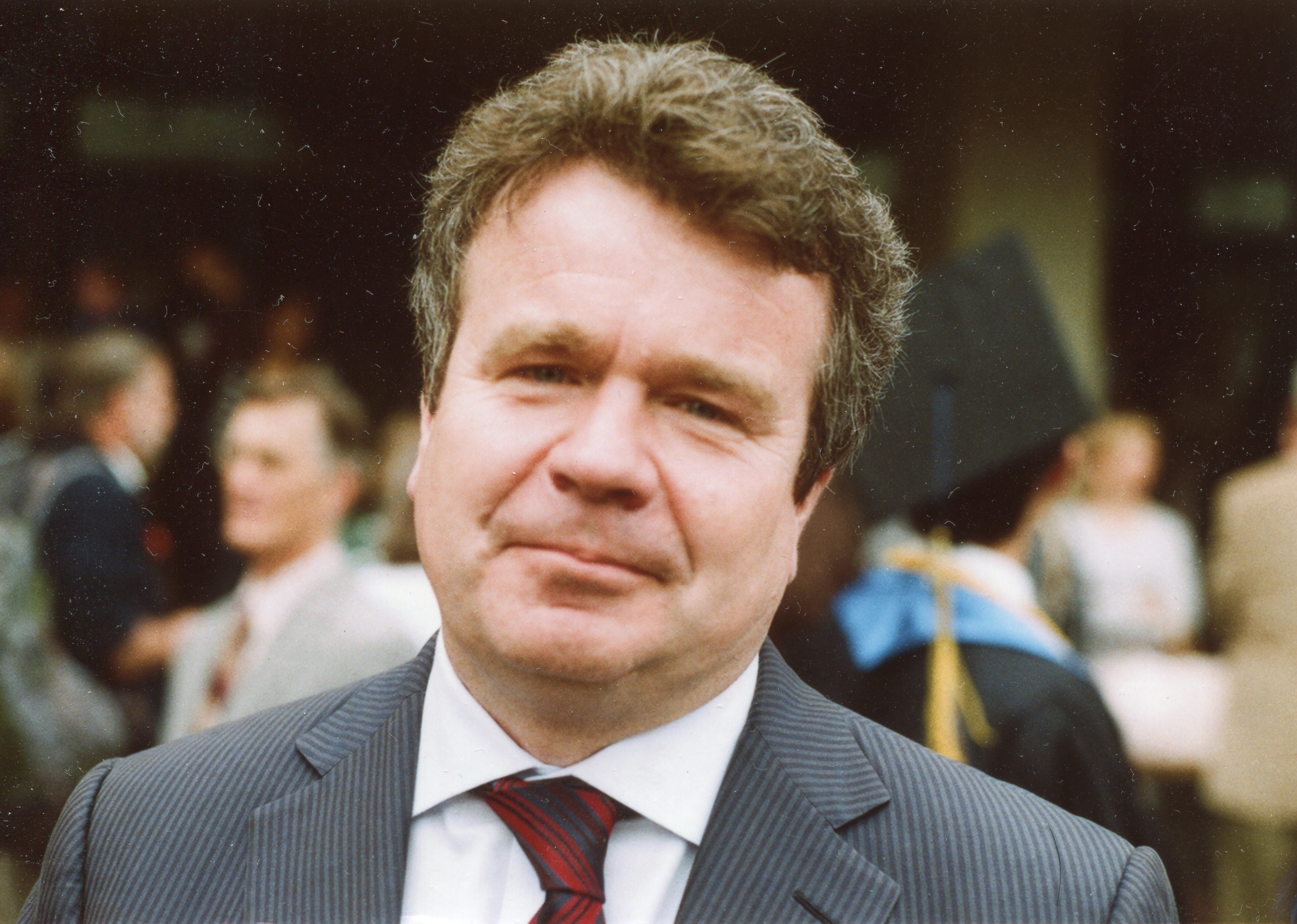
- Zworski in 2010
- Born: 8 October 1963 (age 63); Wrocław, Poland
- Citizenship: Canadian, Polish
- Education: Imperial College, London, U.K. Massachusetts Institute of Technology
- Awards: Fellow of the Royal Society of Canada, 1998; Fellow of American Academy of Arts and Sciences, 2010; Coxeter-James Prize of the Canadian Mathematical Society, 1999; Sierpiński Medal of the University of Warsaw and the Polish Mathematical Society, 2019; Joseph L. Doob Prize, 2026
- Scientific career
- Fields: Mathematics
- Workplaces: Harvard University; Johns Hopkins University; University of Toronto; University of California, Berkeley
- Doctoral advisor: Richard Melrose

Maciej Zworski FRSC (born 8 October 1963) is a Polish-Canadian mathematician, currently a professor of mathematics at the University of California, Berkeley. His mathematical interests include microlocal analysis, scattering theory, and partial differential equations.

He was an invited speaker at International Congress of Mathematicians in Beijing in 2002, and a plenary speaker at the conference Dynamics, Equations and Applications in Kraków in 2019.

Zworski and Semyon Dyatlov are the recipients of the 2026 Joseph L. Doob prize, for their 2019 book Mathematical Theory of Scattering Resonances.

== Selected publications ==
=== Articles ===
- M. Zworski (1988). "Decomposition of normal currents". Proc. Amer. Math. Soc. 102 (4): 831–839. doi:10.1090/s0002-9939-1988-0934852-8. MR 0934852.
- with Johannes Sjöstrand (1991). "Complex scaling and the distribution of scattering poles". J. Amer. Math. Soc. 4: 729–769. doi:10.2307/2939287. JSTOR 2939287. MR 1115789.
- with Laurent Guillopé (1997). "Scattering Asymptotics for Riemann Surfaces". Annals of Mathematics. Second Series. 145 (3): 597–660. doi:10.2307/2951846. JSTOR 2951846.
- "Resonances in Physics and Geometry" (PDF). Notices of the AMS. 46 (3): 319–328. 1999.
- M. Zworski (2001). "A remark on a paper of E. B. Davies". Proc. Amer. Math. Soc. 129 (10): 2955–2957. doi:10.1090/s0002-9939-01-05909-3. MR 1840099.
- with Jared Wunsch (2001). "The FBI transform on compact C^{∞} manifolds". Trans. Amer. Math. Soc. 353: 1151–1167. doi:10.1090/s0002-9947-00-02751-3. MR 1804416.
- with C. Robin Graham (2003). "Scattering matrix in conformal geometry". Inventiones Mathematicae. 152 (1): 89–118. arXiv:math/0109089. Bibcode:2003InMat.152...89G. doi:10.1007/s00222-002-0268-1. S2CID 18310849.
- with Nicolas Burq (2004). "Geometric control in the presence of a black box". J. Amer. Math. Soc. 17 (2): 443–471. arXiv:math/0304184. doi:10.1090/s0894-0347-04-00452-7. MR 2051618.

=== Books ===
- with Richard Melrose and Antônio Sá Barreto: Semi-linear diffraction of conormal waves, Astérisque, vol. 240, Societé Mathématique de France, 1996 abstract
- Semiclassical analysis, American Mathematical Society 2012
- as editor with Plamen Stefanov and András Vasy: Inverse Problems and Applications. Contemporary Mathematics, vol. 615. American Mathematical Society. 2014. ISBN 9781470410797.
- with Semyon Dyatlov: Mathematical Theory of Scattering Resonances. Graduate Studies in Mathematics, vol. 200. American Mathematical Society. 2019. ISBN 9781470443665.
