= List of mathematical probabilists =

See Probabilism for the followers of such a theory in theology or philosophy.

This list contains only probabilists in the sense of mathematicians specializing in probability theory.

- David Aldous (born 1952)
- Siva Athreya (born 1971)
- Thomas Bayes (1702–1761) - British mathematician and Presbyterian minister, known for Bayes' theorem
- Gerard Ben-Arous (born 1957)
- Itai Benjamini
- Jakob Bernoulli (1654–1705) - Switzerland, known for Bernoulli trials
- Jean Bertoin (born 1961)
- Joseph Louis François Bertrand (1822–1900)
- Patrick Billingsley (1925–2011)
- Robert Blumenthal (1931–2012)
- Erwin Bolthausen (born 1945)
- Carlo Emilio Bonferroni (1892–1960)
- Émile Borel (1871–1956)
- Sourav Chatterjee (born 1979)
- Kai Lai Chung (1917–2009)
- Erhan Çınlar (born 1941)
- Harald Cramér (1893–1985)
- Miklós Csörgő (born 1932)
- Sándor Csörgő (1947–2008)
- Amir Dembo (born 1958)
- Persi Diaconis (born 1945)
- Catherine Doléans-Dade (1942–2004)
- Joseph Leo Doob (1910–2004)
- Lester Dubins (1920–2010)
- Richard M. Dudley (1938–2020)
- Hugo Duminil-Copin (born 1985)
- Eugene Dynkin (1924–2014)
- Robert J. Elliott (born 1940)
- Paul Erdős (1913–1996)
- Alison Etheridge (born 1964)
- Steve Evans (born 1960)
- William Feller (1906–1970)
- Bruno de Finetti (1906–1985)
- Hans Föllmer (born 1941)
- Iosif Gikhman (1918–1985)
- Igor Girsanov (1934–1967)
- Boris Gnedenko (1912–1995)
- Geoffrey Grimmett (born 1950)
- Alice Guionnet (born 1969)
- Ian Hacking (1936–2023)
- Paul Halmos (1916–2006)
- Joseph Halpern (1953–2026)
- David Heath (c.1943–2011)
- Wassily Hoeffding (1914–1991)
- Kiyoshi Itô (1915–2008)
- Jean Jacod (born 1944)
- Peter Jagers (born 1941)
- Edwin Thompson Jaynes (1922–1998)
- Richard Jeffrey (1926–2002)
- Harold Jeffreys (1891–1989)
- Mark Kac (1914–1984)
- Olav Kallenberg (born 1939)
- Gopinath Kallianpur (1925–2015)
- Rudolf E. Kálmán (1930–2016)
- Rajeeva L. Karandikar (born 1956)
- Samuel Karlin (1924–2007)
- David George Kendall (1918–2007)
- Richard Kenyon (born 1964)
- Harry Kesten (1931–2019)
- John Maynard Keynes (1883–1946) - best known for his pioneering work in economics
- Aleksandr Khinchin (1894–1959)
- Andrey Kolmogorov (1903–1987)
- Pierre-Simon Laplace (1749–1827)
- Gregory Lawler (born 1955)
- Lucien Le Cam (1924–2000)
- Jean-François Le Gall (born 1959)
- Paul Lévy (1886–1971)
- Jarl Waldemar Lindeberg (1876–1932)
- Paul Malliavin (1925–2010)
- Andrey Markov (1856–1922)
- Stefan Mazurkiewicz (1888–1945)
- Henry P. McKean, Jr (1930–2024)
- Paul-André Meyer (1934–2003)
- Richard von Mises (1883–1953)
- Abraham de Moivre (1667–1754)
- Octav Onicescu (1892–1983)
- K. R. Parthasarathy (1936–2023)
- Blaise Pascal (1623–1662)
- Charles E. M. Pearce (1940–2012)
- Yuval Peres (born 1963)
- Edwin A. Perkins (born 1953)
- Siméon Denis Poisson (1781–1840)
- Yuri Vasilevich Prokhorov (1929–2013)
- Frank P. Ramsey (1903–1930)
- Alfréd Rényi (1921–1970)
- Oded Schramm (1961–2008)
- Romano Scozzafava (born 1935)
- Scott Sheffield (born 1973)
- Albert Shiryaev (born 1934)
- Yakov Sinai (born 1935)
- Anatoliy Skorokhod (1930–2011)
- Ray Solomonoff (1926–2009)
- Frank Spitzer (1926–1992)
- Ruslan L. Stratonovich (1930–1997)
- Daniel W. Stroock (1940–2025)
- Alain-Sol Sznitman (born 1955)
- Michel Talagrand (born 1952)
- Bálint Tóth (born 1955)
- S. R. Srinivasa Varadhan (born 1940)
- Bálint Virág (born 1973)
- Wendelin Werner (born 1968)
- Norbert Wiener (1894–1964)
- David Williams
- Marc Yor (1949–2014)
- Ofer Zeitouni (born 1960)

== See also ==
- List of statisticians
