= Nike Sun =

Nike Sun is a probability theorist who works as a Professor of Mathematics at the Massachusetts Institute of Technology as of July 2024, on leave from the department of statistics at the University of California, Berkeley. She won the Rollo Davidson Prize in 2017. Her research concerns phase transitions and the counting complexity of problems ranging from the Ising model in physics to the behavior of random instances of the Boolean satisfiability problem in computer science.

== Education and career ==
Sun graduated from Harvard University in 2009 with a bachelor's degree in mathematics and a master's degree in statistics, and spent a year studying for the Mathematical Tripos at the University of Cambridge before completing her doctorate at Stanford University in 2014. Her dissertation, Gibbs measures and phase transitions on locally tree-like graphs, was supervised by Amir Dembo.

After postdoctoral research at Microsoft Research in New England, at the Massachusetts Institute of Technology Mathematics Department, and as a Simons Fellow at the University of California, Berkeley, she joined the Berkeley faculty as an assistant professor in 2016. She moved to the Massachusetts Institute of Technology as an associate professor in 2018.

== Recognition ==
Sun was awarded the Rollo Davidson Prize, given annually to an early-career probability theorist, in 2017. The award citation credited her research (with Jian Ding and Allan Sly) proving the existence of a threshold density such that random k-satisfiability instances whose ratio of clauses to variables is below the threshold are almost always satisfiable, and instances whose ratio is above the threshold are almost always unsatisfiable. She was awarded the 2020 Wolfgang Doeblin prize by the Bernoulli Society, given biannually to a single individual for outstanding research in the field of probability, and who is at the beginning of their mathematical career.

She was an invited plenary speaker at the 40th Stochastic Processes and their Applications conference.
