= Gaussian field =

Gaussian field may refer to:

- A field of Gaussian rationals in number theory
- Gaussian free field, a concept in statistical mechanics
- A Gaussian random field, a field of Gaussian-distributed random variables
