= Varopoulos =

Varopoulos is a surname. Notable people with the surname include:

- Nicholas Varopoulos (born 1940), Greek mathematician
- Theodoros Varopoulos (1884–1957), Greek mathematician
