= Rabi Bhattacharya =

Indian mathematician

Rabindra N. Bhattacharya
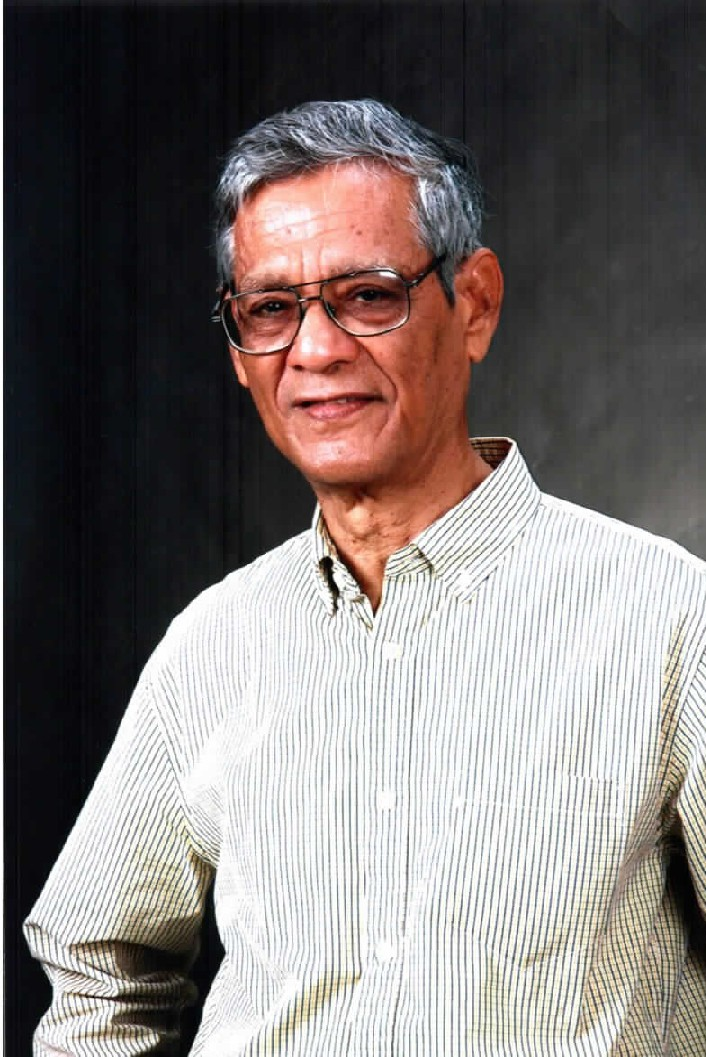
- Born: 11 January 1937 (age 89)
- Education: Presidency College; Calcutta University; University of Chicago
- Awards: Humboldt Prize (1993); Guggenheim Fellowship (2000)
- Scientific career
- Fields: Mathematics; Statistics
- Institutions: University of California, Berkeley; University of Arizona; Indiana University
- Thesis: Berry-Esseen Bounds for the Multi-Dimensional Central Limit Theorem (1967)
- Doctoral advisor: Patrick Billingsley
- Website: math.arizona.edu/~rabi/

Rabindra Nath Bhattacharya (born January 11, 1937) is a mathematician/statistician at the University of Arizona. He works in the fields of probability theory and theoretical statistics where he has made fundamental contributions to long-standing problems in both areas. He is married to Bithika Gouri Bhattacharya, with a daughter, a son, and four grandchildren.

== Early life and education ==
Bhattacharya was born January 11, 1937, in his ancestral home Porgola, Barisal District, in the present country of Bangladesh. He received his B.S. and M.S. degree in 1956 and 1959 respectively from Presidency College and Calcutta University. He completed his Ph.D. under direction of Patrick Billingsley at the University of Chicago in 1967.

== Academic career ==
His first academic position was as assistant professor in the Department of Statistics at the University of California, Berkeley. In 1972, he accepted a position as associate professor in the Department of Mathematics at the University of Arizona in Tucson, and was promoted to full professor in 1977. In 1982, he moved to Indiana University, where he remained until his retirement in 2002. Upon retirement from Indiana University, he was re-appointed as a tenured full professor at the University of Arizona, retiring in May, 2018.

== Awards and honors ==
Bhattacharya has received many awards and honors, including Special Invited Papers in the Annals of Probability (1977) and the Annals of Applied Probability (1999). He is a Fellow of the Institute of Mathematical Statistics (1978). In 1988, he and M. Denker were invited by the German Mathematical Society to give DMV Seminar, Band 14, published by Birkhäuser as ″Asymptotic Statistics″. He received the prestigious Humboldt Prize (1993) and the Guggenheim Fellowship (2000). He also gave an invited talk, now referred to as a Medallion Lecture at the IMS Annual Meeting in Chicago (1996).
