= Loève Prize =

American mathematics award

The Line and Michel Loève International Prize in Probability (known as the Loève Prize) is an American mathematical award. It is awarded every two years, and is intended to recognize outstanding contributions by researchers in mathematical probability who are under 45 years old.

== History ==
The Line and Michel Loève International Prize in Probability, usually referred to as the Loève Prize, was created in 1992 in honor of Michel Loève from a bequest to UC Berkeley by his widow Line.

== Description ==
It is awarded every two years, and is intended to recognize outstanding contributions by researchers in mathematical probability who are under 45 years old.

With a prize value of around $30,000, this is one of the most generous awards in any specific mathematical subdiscipline.

== Winners ==
Past winners of the prize are:

- 2025 – Jason P. Miller
- 2023 – Jian Ding
- 2021 – Ivan Corwin
- 2019 – Allan Sly
- 2017 – Hugo Duminil-Copin
- 2015 – Alexei Borodin
- 2013 – Sourav Chatterjee
- 2011 – Scott Sheffield
- 2009 – Alice Guionnet
- 2007 – Richard Kenyon
- 2005 – Wendelin Werner
- 2003 – Oded Schramm
- 2001 – Yuval Peres
- 1999 – Alain-Sol Sznitman
- 1997 – Jean-François Le Gall
- 1995 – Michel Talagrand
- 1993 – David Aldous

== See also ==
- List of mathematics awards
