= Jian Ding =

Chinese mathematician and probability theorist

Jian Ding (Chinese: 丁剑) is a Chinese mathematician and probability theorist. He is a chair professor at the School of Mathematical Sciences of Peking University, where he also serves as vice dean. In 2023 he was awarded the Loève Prize.

== Education and career ==
Ding entered Peking University in 2002 and received his bachelor's degree in mathematics in 2006. He earned his PhD in statistics from the University of California, Berkeley in 2011, under the supervision of Yuval Peres.

After postdoctoral positions at the University of Washington and as a Szegö Assistant Professor at Stanford University, Ding joined the faculty of the University of Chicago, where he became an associate professor in the Department of Statistics. He then moved to the University of Pennsylvania, where he was the Gilbert Helman Professor in the Wharton School. In January 2022 he returned to Peking University as a chair professor.

== Research ==
Ding's research is in probability theory, in particular its interactions with statistical physics and theoretical computer science. His work has covered random walks, Gaussian processes, random constraint satisfaction problems, random planar geometry, spin models, and Anderson localization. With Allan Sly and Nike Sun, he proved the satisfiability threshold conjecture for random k-SAT for large k.

== Awards and honors ==
- Alfred P. Sloan Fellowship (2015)
- NSF CAREER Award (2015)
- Rollo Davidson Prize (2017, shared with Nike Sun)
- Invited speaker at the International Congress of Mathematicians (2022, joint lecture with Julien Dubédat and Ewain Gwynne)
- Gold Medal of Mathematics of the International Congress of Chinese Mathematicians (2022)
- Loève Prize (2023)
- IMS Medallion Lecture (2023)
- Plenary speaker at the International Congress on Mathematical Physics (2024)
- Fellow of the Institute of Mathematical Statistics (2025)
