= Ivan Corwin =

American mathematician

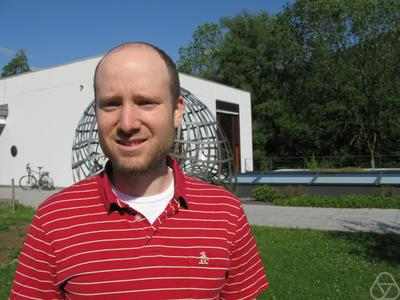
- Corwin in 2011
- Born: May 24, 1984 (age 42); Poughkeepsie, New York, U.S.
- Education: Harvard University (BA); New York University (PhD)
- Awards: Simons Investigator (2022); Loeve Prize (2021); Visiting Miller Professorship (2021); Simons Fellowship (2021); David and Lucile Packard Foundation Fellowship for Science and Engineering (2014); Rollo Davidson Prize (2014); Poincaré Chair (2014); Young Scientist Prize of the International Union of Pure and Applied Physics (2012); Clay Research Fellow (2012)
- Scientific career
- Fields: Mathematics
- Workplaces: Columbia University
- Doctoral advisor: Gerard Ben Arous

Ivan Zachary Corwin (born May 24, 1984) is an American mathematician who is a professor of mathematics at Columbia University. His research concerns probability, mathematical physics, quantum integrable systems, stochastic PDEs, and random matrix theory. He is particularly known for work related to the Kardar–Parisi–Zhang equation.

== Education and career ==
Corwin was born in Poughkeepsie, New York. He graduated from Harvard University in 2006 receiving an A.B. in mathematics, and subsequently received his Ph.D. from the Courant Institute at New York University under direction of Gerard Ben Arous. He held the first Schramm Memorial Postdoctoral Fellowship at Microsoft Research, New England and MIT from 2012–2014, was a Clay Research Fellow from 2012–2016, and held the first Poincaré Chair in 2014 at the Institute Henri Poincaré. In 2021, he held a Miller visiting professorship at the Miller Institute as well as a Simons Fellowship. Corwin has taught at Columbia University since 2013. He is on the editorial board of the journal Probability Theory and Related Fields. He lives in New Rochelle, NY.

== Awards and honors ==
In 2012 he received the Young Scientist Prize of the International Union of Pure and Applied Physics. In 2014, he was awarded a David and Lucile Packard Foundation Fellowship for Science and Engineering as well as the Rollo Davidson Prize. Also in that year, he was invited to present his work at the International Congress of Mathematicians.

In 2017, along with Alexei Borodin and Patrik Ferrari, he received the inaugural Gerard L. Alexanderson Award from the American Institute of Mathematics. The following year, in 2018, he was elected as a fellow of the Institute of Mathematical Statistics.

In 2021, Corwin was awarded the Loeve Prize and the following year, he was named a Fellow of the American Mathematical Society, in the 2022 class of fellows, "for contributions to integrable probability, the Kardar-Parisi-Zhang universality class, and stochastic vertex models". In 2022, Corwin was awarded a Simons Investigator grant.
