= Probabilist =

probabilist may refer to:

- A follower of probabilism (in theology or philosophy)
- A mathematician who studies and applies probability theory
  - List of mathematical probabilists
