= Annals of Probability =

- Discipline: Probability theory
- Language: English
- Edited by: Christophe Garban, Alice Guionnet.

Publication details
- History: 1973–present
- Publisher: Institute of Mathematical Statistics (United States)
- Frequency: Bimonthly
- Impact factor: 2.085 (2018)

Standard abbreviations
- ISO 4: Ann. Probab.

Indexing
- CODEN: APBYAE
- ISSN: 0091-1798
- LCCN: 73643472
- JSTOR: 00911798
- OCLC no.: 01786664

Links
- Journal homepage; Online access at Project Euclid

Annals of Probability is a leading peer-reviewed probability journal published by the Institute of Mathematical Statistics, which is the main international society for researchers in the areas of probability and statistics. The journal was started in 1973 as a continuation in part of the Annals of Mathematical Statistics, which was split into the Annals of Statistics and this journal.

In July 2021, the journal was ranked 7th in the field Probability & Statistics with Applications according to Google Scholar. It had an impact factor of 1.470 (as of 2010), according to the Journal Citation Reports. The impact factor for 2018 is 2.085. Its CiteScore is 4.3, and SCImago Journal Rank is 3.184, both from 2020.

== Editors-in-chief: past and present ==
The following persons have been editor-in-chief of the journal:

- Ronald Pyke (1972–1975)
- Patrick Billingsley (1976–1978)
- Richard M. Dudley (1979–1981)
- Thomas M. Liggett (1985–1987)
- Peter E. Ney (1988–1990)
- Burgess Davis (1991–1993)
- James W. Pitman (1994–1996)
- Raghu Varadhan (1997–1999)
- Thomas Kurtz (2000–2002)
- Steven Lalley (2003–2005)
- Greg Lawler (2006–2008)
- Ofer Zeitouni (2009–2011)
- Krzysztof Burdzy (2012–2014)
- Maria Eulália Vares (2015–2017)
- Amir Dembo (2018–2020)
- Christophe Garban & Alice Guionnet (2021–2023)
