= Olle Häggström =

Swedish mathematician

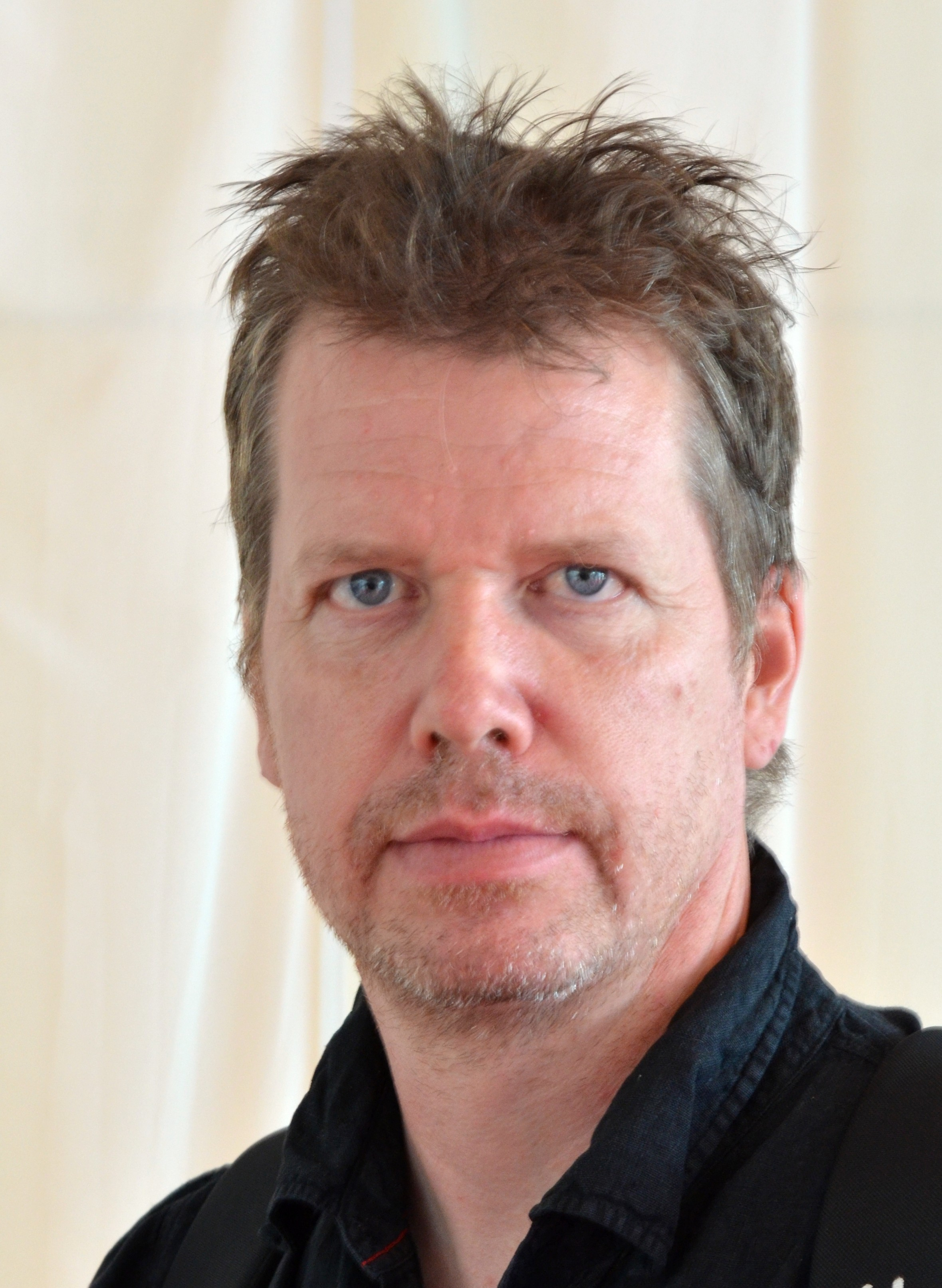
- Olle Häggström in Almedalen 2016
- Born: October 4, 1967 (age 58)
- Education: Chalmers University of Technology
- Awards: Rollo Davidson Prize (2005)
- Scientific career
- Fields: Probability theory
- Workplaces: Chalmers University of Technology
- Thesis: Aspects of spatial random processes (1994)
- Doctoral advisor: Jeffrey Steif
- Doctoral students: Maria Deijfen
- Website: www.math.chalmers.se/~olleh/

Olle Häggström (born 4 October 1967) is a Swedish professor of mathematical statistics at Chalmers University of Technology. Häggström earned his doctorate in 1994 at Chalmers University of Technology with Jeffrey Steif as supervisor. He became an associate professor in the same university in 1997, and professor of mathematical statistics at University of Gothenburg in 2000. In 2002 he was back at Chalmers University of Technology as professor. He mainly researches on probability theory such as Markov chains, percolation theory and other models in statistical mechanics.

== Awards and honors ==
Olle Häggström has received a number of awards and prizes. These include:

- 2004 – Elected member 1506 of the Royal Swedish Academy of Sciences, in the Mathematics class.
- 2005 – Awarded the Rollo Davidson Prize.
- 2006 – Elected member of Royal Society of Arts and Sciences in Gothenburg.
- 2010 – Elected member 1581 of the Royal Swedish Academy of Engineering Sciences (IVA), in the 7:th division: VII Basic and Interdisciplinary Engineering Sciences.

== Here Be Dragons ==
In 2016, Häggström published (via Oxford University Press) Here Be Dragons: Science, Technology and the Future of Humanity, an attempt to draft a road map of potential dangers that could be associated with various emerging technologies: "There is no denying that advances in science and technology have brought us prosperity and improved our lives tremendously... but there is a flip side: some of the advances that may lie ahead of us can actually make us worse off."

On human enhancement, Häggström argues that any enhancement, from growth hormones to cognitive enhancement, can encourage an "arms race" in which everyone is compelled to participate for fear of falling behind: "It is hard to imagine the US silently sitting still and watching a cognitive enhancement development that can turn China into the world’s military overlords." On geoengineering, Häggström discusses a proposed form of geoengineering that involves continuously pumping sulphur dioxide into the atmosphere to counteract global warming, and warns this could create a catastrophic risk of a massive temperature spike if a future generation were unable to continue pumping. On nanotechnology, Häggström discusses concerns about self-replicating nanobots, as well as the potential for emerging manufacturing technologies to undo existing gun control measures and to radically upscale the quantities of existing weaponry, and to create destabilizing new classes of weapons. Other topics include existential risks from high-energy physics experiments, as well as from advanced artificial intelligence: Häggström poses a scenario in which a superintelligent computer, aiming to maximise happiness in the universe, calculates that sentient beings are happy less than half the time, and proceeds to exterminate all sentient life, in order to increase the existing sum of happiness a negative number to zero. Häggström also discusses SETI, criticizing "inexcusably reckless" attempts to communicate with aliens.

In a positive review in New Scientist, a reviewer raises the question: "What if extraterrestrial advice could have saved us from some other danger, and we doomed civilisation by not asking?" and cautions there are "no easy answers" to these questions.

== See also ==
- Global catastrophic risk
