= Xin Sun =

Probabilist and mathematical physicist

- Sun at Oberwolfach in 2024
- Education: Massachusetts Institute of Technology
- Awards: Rollo Davidson Prize (2023) Frontiers of Science Award in Mathematics (2024)
- Scientific career
- Fields: Mathematics
- Workplaces: Peking University
- Doctoral advisor: Scott Sheffield

Xin Sun (Chinese: 孙鑫) is a Chinese mathematician specializing in probability theory and mathematical physics. He is a professor of mathematics at Peking University.

== Career ==
Sun graduated from Peking University in 2011 with a B.S. in mathematics. In 2017, he received his Ph.D. in mathematics from the Massachusetts Institute of Technology, under the supervision of Scott Sheffield. He was a Junior Fellow of the Simons Society of Fellows from 2017 to 2020, during which time he was a postdoctoral researcher at Columbia University. From 2020 to 2023 he was a faculty member at the University of Pennsylvania, and he was a visiting researcher at the Institute for Advanced Study from 2022 to 2023. As of 2023, he is a faculty member at Peking University.

== Research ==
Sun studies random curves and surfaces and their connections with statistical mechanics and conformal field theory. His work explores, in particular, the relationships between Schramm–Loewner evolution, Liouville quantum gravity and Liouville conformal field theory.

With Nina Holden, Sun proved that uniformly sampled triangulations converge to a Liouville quantum gravity disk under a conformal embedding, establishing joint convergence of distances, boundary lengths and areas.

With Pierre Nolin, Wei Qian and Zijie Zhuang, Sun derived an exact expression for the backbone exponent of critical site percolation on the triangular lattice. This exponent describes how the probability of two disjoint open paths crossing an annulus decays as the annulus becomes thicker. They proved that it is a transcendental number, whereas all previously known percolation arm exponents were rational.

== Awards and recognition ==
Sun received the Bernoulli Society New Researcher Award in 2020. He received the Rollo Davidson Prize in 2023, given "for leading work on random planar maps and Liouville quantum gravity", and the Frontiers of Science Award in Mathematics in 2024. Sun was an invited speaker at the 2026 International Congress of Mathematicians.
