= Convergence of Probability Measures =

Textbook by Patrick Billingsley

- First edition
- Author: Patrick Billingsley
- Language: English
- Series: Wiley series in probability and mathematical statistics
- Subject: Probability theory
- Genre: Textbook
- Publisher: Wiley
- Publication date: 1968
- Pages: 253

Convergence of Probability Measures is a graduate textbook in the field of mathematical probability theory. It was written by Patrick Billingsley and published by Wiley in 1968. A second edition in 1999 both simplified its treatment of previous topics and updated the book for more recent developments. The Basic Library List Committee of the Mathematical Association of America has recommended its inclusion in undergraduate mathematics libraries. Readers are expected to already be familiar with both the fundamentals of probability theory and the topology of metric spaces.

The subject weak convergence of measures involves rigorous study of how a continuous time (or space) stochastic process arises as a scaling limit of a discrete time (or space) process. A fundamental example, Donsker's theorem, is convergence of rescaled random walk to Brownian motion. The mathematical theory, combining probability and functional analysis, was first developed in the 1950s by Skorokhod and Prokhorov, but was regarded as a specialized advanced topic. This book's contribution was a self-contained treatment at a useful basic level of abstraction, that of Polish space. It covers key theory tools such as Prokhorov's theorem on relative compactness of measures and the Skorokhod space of càdlàg functions. The second edition includes Skorokhod's representation theorem. Though criticized by Dudley for insufficient generality, a reviewer wrote "the subject matter is of great current interest and the exposition is lucid and elegant." By being widely accessible it was for many years the standard reference, as evidenced by over 22,000 citations on Google Scholar. In particular, the subject became a highly valuable tool within burgeoning fields of applied probability such as queueing theory and empirical process theory in statistics.
