= Maria Deijfen =

Swedish mathematician (born 1975)

Maria Deijfen (born 1975) is a Swedish mathematician known for her research on random graphs and stochastic processes on graphs, including the Reed–Frost model of epidemics. She is a professor of mathematics at Stockholm University.

== Education and career ==
Deijfen was educated at Stockholm University, earning a licenciate in 2001, a doctorate in 2004, and a habilitation in 2008. Her doctoral dissertation, Stochastic Models for Spatial Growth and Competition, was supervised by Olle Häggström.

After completing her doctorate, she became a postdoctoral researcher at the Mittag-Leffler Institute, Vrije Universiteit Amsterdam, Chalmers University, and Delft University of Technology before returning to Stockholm as a junior faculty member in 2006. She was promoted to full professor in mathematical statistics in 2015.

== Recognition ==
Deijfen was one of the 2018 recipients of the Paul R. Halmos – Lester R. Ford Award of the Mathematical Association of America for her paper with Alexander E. Holroyd and James B. Martin, "Friendly Frogs, Stable Marriage, and the Magic of Invariance", using combinatorial game theory to analyze the stable marriage problem.
