= Tom Hutchcroft =

British mathematician

- Hutchcroft at Oberwolfach in 2018
- Citizenship: United Kingdom
- Education: Cambridge University; University of British Columbia
- Known for: Percolation theory
- Awards: Rollo Davidson Prize (2019); EMS Prize (2024); Whitehead Prize (2025)
- Scientific career
- Workplaces: Cambridge University; California Institute of Technology; Microsoft Research
- Doctoral advisor: Omer Angel, Assaf Nachmias

Tom Hutchcroft is a British mathematician whose research is in probability theory. His work on percolation theory won him the Rollo Davidson Prize in 2019 and the 2024 EMS Prize given by the European Mathematical Society. He is a professor at California Institute of Technology. In 2026 he will become a professor at Princeton University.

== Biography ==
Hutchcroft grew up in Glastonbury. He received a bachelor's degree in mathematics from the University of Cambridge in 2013. Next he completed a Ph.D. from the University of British Columbia in 2017. During his graduate studies he had internships with the Microsoft Research theory group. After his graduate studies, Hutchcroft was a Senior Research Associate and Herchel Smith postdoctoral research fellow at Trinity College, Cambridge, from 2017 to 2021. He then joined the Caltech faculty in 2021.

== Research ==
Hutchcroft is known for his work on percolation theory in non-Euclidean geometries and for his proof of Schramm's locality conjecture.

== Awards and honors ==
- Rollo Davidson Prize (2019)
- EMS Prize (2024)
- In 2026 he gave the Łojasiewicz Lecture (on the "Dimension dependence of critical phenomena") at the Jagiellonian University in Kraków.
