= Rollo Davidson Prize =

English award in probability theory

The Rollo Davidson Prize is a prize awarded annually to early-career probabilists by the Rollo Davidson trustees. It is named after English mathematician Rollo Davidson (1944–1970).

== Rollo Davidson Trust ==
In 1970, Rollo Davidson, a Fellow-elect of Churchill College, Cambridge died on Piz Bernina, a mountain in Switzerland. In 1975, a trust fund was established at Churchill College in his memory, endowed initially through the publication in his honour of two volumes of papers, edited by E. F. Harding and D. G. Kendall.

The Rollo Davidson Trust has awarded an annual prize to young probabilists since 1976, and has organized occasional lectures in honour of Davidson. Since 2012 the Trust has also awarded an annual Thomas Bond Sprague Prize.

== List of recipients of the Rollo Davidson Prize ==
- 1976 – Brian D. Ripley
- 1977 – Olav Kallenberg
- 1978 – Zhen-ting Hou
- 1979 – Frank Kelly
- 1980 – David Aldous and Erik Jørgensen
- 1981 – John C. Gittins
- 1982 – Rouben V. Ambartzumian and Persi Diaconis
- 1983 – Ed Perkins
- 1984 – Martin Thomas Barlow and Chris Rogers
- 1985 – Piet Groeneboom and Terence John Lyons
- 1986 – Peter Hall and Jean-François Le Gall
- 1987 – Yao-chi Yu, Jie-zhong Zou, and Andrew Carverhill
- 1988 – Peter Baxendale, Imre Z. Ruzsa, and Gábor J. Székely
- 1989 – Geoffrey Grimmett and Rémi Léandre
- 1990 – Steven Evans
- 1991 – Alain-Sol Sznitman
- 1992 – Krzysztof Burdzy
- 1993 – Gérard Ben Arous and Robin Pemantle
- 1994 – Thomas Mountford and Laurent Saloff-Coste
- 1995 – Philippe Biane and Yuval Peres
- 1996 – Bruce Driver and Jean Bertoin
- 1997 – James Norris and Martin Schweizer
- 1998 – Davar Khoshnevisan and Wendelin Werner
- 1999 – Raphaël Cerf and Gareth Roberts
- 2000 – Kurt Johansson and David Wilson
- 2001 – Richard Kenyon
- 2002 – Stanislav Smirnov and Balaji Prabhakar
- 2003 – Alice Guionnet
- 2004 – Alexander Holroyd and Itai Benjamini
- 2005 – Olle Häggström and Neil O'Connell
- 2006 – Scott Sheffield
- 2007 – Remco van der Hofstad
- 2008 – Brian Rider and Bálint Virág
- 2009 – Grégory Miermont
- 2010 – Sourav Chatterjee and Gady Kozma
- 2011 – Christophe Garban and Gábor Pete
- 2012 – Vincent Beffara and Hugo Duminil-Copin
- 2013 – Eyal Lubetzky and Allan Sly
- 2014 – Paul Bourgade and Ivan Corwin
- 2015 – Nicolas Curien and Jason Miller
- 2016 – Omer Angel, Jean-Christophe Mourrat, and Hendrik Weber
- 2017 – Jian Ding and Nike Sun
- 2018 – Nicolas Perkowski
- 2019 – Tom Hutchcroft and Vincent Tassion
- 2020 – Roland Bauerschmidt and Ewain Gwynne
- 2021 – Ioan Manolescu and Daniel Remenik
- 2022 – Amol Aggarwal and Konstantin Tikhomirov
- 2023 – Duncan Dauvergne, Nina Holden and Xin Sun
- 2024 – Ilya Chevyrev, Pierre-Francois Rodriguez and Tianyi Zheng
- 2025 – Mark Sellke, Hao Shen and Eliran Subag
- 2026 – Giuseppe Cannizzaro, Jiaoyang Huang and Titus Lupu

== List of Rollo Davidson Lecturers ==
- 1996 Persi Diaconis
- 2001 Wendelin Werner
- 2010 Stanislav Smirnov
- 2015 Yuval Peres
- 2024 Allan Sly (mathematician)

== See also ==
- List of mathematics awards
