= Maria Eulália Vares =

Brazilian mathematical statistician and probability theorist

Maria Eulália Vares is a Brazilian mathematical statistician and probability theorist who is known for her expertise in stochastic processes and large deviations theory. She is a professor of statistics in the Institute of Mathematics of the Federal University of Rio de Janeiro, from 2006 to 2009 was the editor-in-chief of the journal Stochastic Processes and their Applications, publisher by Elsevier for the Bernoulli Society for Mathematical Statistics and Probability, and from 2015 to 2017 was the editor-in-chief of the Annals of Probability, published by the Institute of Mathematical Statistics.

Vares graduated in 1975 from the Federal University of Rio Grande do Sul with a bachelor's degree in mathematics. After earning a master's degree in statistics in 1977 from the Instituto Nacional de Matemática Pura e Aplicada, she went to the University of California, Berkeley for doctoral study in statistics. She completed her Ph.D. in 1980; her dissertation, supervised by P. Warwick Millar, was On Two Parameter Lévy Processes.

With Enzo Olivieri, Vares is the author of the book Large Deviations and Metastability (Encyclopedia of Mathematics and its Applications 100, Cambridge University Press, 2005).

She is a Fellow of the Institute of Mathematical Statistics, and an elected member of the International Statistical Institute.
