= Laurent Saloff-Coste =

French mathematician (born 1958)

- Saloff-Coste at Oberwolfach, 2013
- Born: 1958 (age 67–68)
- Education: Paris VI
- Awards: Rollo Davidson Prize (1984)
- Scientific career
- Fields: Analysis, Probability theory, Geometric group theory
- Workplaces: Cornell; Toulouse III; Paris VI
- Thesis: Analyse harmonique et analyse réelle sur les groupes (1989)
- Doctoral advisor: Nicholas Varopoulos
- Doctoral students: Tianyi Zheng

Laurent Saloff-Coste (born 1958) is a French mathematician whose research is in analysis, probability theory, and geometric group theory. He is a professor of mathematics at Cornell University.

== Education and career ==
Saloff-Coste received his "doctorat de 3eme cycle" in 1983 at the Pierre and Marie Curie University, Paris VI. He completed his "Doctorat d'Etat" in 1989 under Nicholas Varopoulos. In the 1990s, he worked as "Directeur de Recherche" (CNRS) at Paul Sabatier University in Toulouse. Since 1998, he is a professor of mathematics at Cornell University in Ithaca, New York, where he was chair from 2009 to 2015.

=== Research ===
Saloff-Coste works in the areas of analysis and probability theory, including problems involving geometry and partial differential equations. In particular, he has studied the behavior of diffusion processes on manifolds and their fundamental solutions, in connection to the geometry of the underlying spaces. He also studies random walks on groups and how their behavior reflects the algebraic structure of the underlying group. He has developed quantitative estimates for the convergence of finite Markov chains and corresponding stochastic algorithms.

== Recognition ==
He received the Rollo Davidson Prize in 1994, and is a fellow of the American Mathematical Society and of the Institute of Mathematical Statistics. In 2011 he was elected to the American Academy of Arts and Sciences.

== Selected publications ==
- Aspects of Sobolev Type Inequalities, London Mathematical Society Lecture Notes, Band 289, Cambridge University Press, 2002.
- Random walks on finite groups, in Harry Kesten (publisher) Probability on Discrete Structures, Encyclopaedia Math. Sciences, Band 110, Springer Verlag, 2004, S. 263–346.
- with Persi Diaconis Comparison theorems for random walks on finite groups, Annals of Probability, Band 21, 1993, S. 2131–2156
- Lectures on finite Markov chains, in Lectures on Probability Theory and Statistics, Lecture Notes in Mathematics, Band 1665, 1997, S. 301-413
- with Nicholas Varopoulos, T. Coulhon Analysis and geometry on groups, Cambridge Tracts in Mathematics, Band 100, Cambridge University Press 1992
- with Dominique Bakry, Michel Ledoux Markov Semigroups at Saint Flour, Series Probability at Saint Flour, Springer Verlag 2012
