= Houman Owhadi =

Researcher in applied mathematics

- Education: École Polytechnique; EPFL
- Known for: Statistical numerical approximation Kernel methods Uncertainty quantification
- Awards: Germund Dahlquist Prize (2019); Fellow, SIAM (2022); Vannevar Bush Fellow, United States Department of Defense (2024)
- Scientific career
- Fields: Applied mathematics
- Workplaces: California Institute of Technology; CNRS
- Doctoral advisor: Gérard Ben Arous

Houman Owhadi is a professor of Applied and Computational Mathematics and Control and Dynamical Systems in the Computing and Mathematical Sciences department at the California Institute of Technology. He is known for his work in statistical numerical approximation, kernel learning, and uncertainty quantification.

== Academic biography ==
Owhadi studied at the École polytechnique where he received a M.S. in Mathematics and Physics in 1994 and was a civil servant in the Corps des ponts in 1997. He received his Ph.D. in mathematics from the École Polytechnique Fédérale de Lausanne in 2001, studying under Gérard Ben Arous. He was a CNRS Research Fellow between 2001 and 2004. He joined the California Institute of Technology in 2004 and became Professor of Applied & Computational Mathematics and Control & Dynamical Systems in 2011.

== Research ==
Owhadi is noted for his work in the field of statistical numerical approximation, which explores the interplay between numerical approximation and statistical inference. His work has influenced the field of probabilistic numerics which combines approaches from machine learning and applied mathematics.

He has done extensive work in uncertainty quantification and has been editor of the Handbook of Uncertainty Quantification and the SIAM/ASA Journal on Uncertainty Quantification.

He has also worked on Gaussian processes and kernel methods, the problem of kernel learning, and numerical homogenization.

== Awards and honors ==
Owhadi won the EPFL doctorate award for his thesis in 2001. He was an invited lecturer at the SIAM conference on Computational Science and Engineering in 2015 and a plenary speaker at the XVI International Conference on Hyperbolic Problems. In 2019, he received the SIAM Germund Dahlquist Prize. He was elected a SIAM fellow in 2022 for "outstanding contributions in statistical numerical approximation, kernel learning, and uncertainty quantification". He was elected as part of the 2024 class of Vannevar Bush Fellows, the United States Department of Defense's flagship single-investigator award for basic research.
