= Bénédicte Haas =

French mathematician

Bénédicte Haas (born 1976) is a French mathematician specializing in probability theory and especially the theories of fragmentation processes, random trees, and self-similar Markov processes. She is a professor of mathematics at Sorbonne Paris North University, a member of the Laboratoire Analyse, Géométrie et Applications (LAGA) of CNRS and Paris 8 University, and head of the Paris Graduate School of Mathematical Science program.

== Education and career ==
In 2001, Haas received a master's degree in mathematics from Louis Pasteur University in Strasbourg, and a diplôme d'études approfondies in probability and its applications through Pierre and Marie Curie University. She sustained a 2004 doctorate from Pierre and Marie Curie University, directed by Jean Bertoin, and was a postdoctoral researcher at the University of Oxford in 2004 and 2005.

Before taking her current professor position, she was maître de conférences at Paris Dauphine University from 2005 to 2015, and at the École normale supérieure (Paris) from 2011 to 2014. She completed a habilitation through Paris Dauphine University in 2010. In 2015, she became a professor at Sorbonne Paris North University and a member of LAGA.

She was editor-in-chief of the Electronic Journal of Probability from 2021 to 2023.

== Recognition ==
Haas was elected as a Fellow of the Institute of Mathematical Statistics in 2026, "for seminal contributions to the study of fragmentation processes, random trees and their scaling limits".
