= Scott Sheffield =

American mathematician

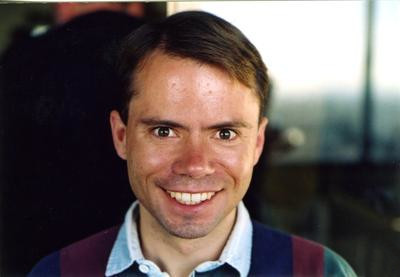
- Education: Stanford University
- Children: 4
- Awards: Loève Prize (2011); Rollo Davidson Prize (2006); Clay Research Award (2017); Henri Poincaré Prize (2024)
- Scientific career
- Fields: Mathematician
- Workplaces: MIT
- Thesis: Random surfaces: large deviations and gradient Gibbs measure classifications (2003)
- Doctoral advisor: Amir Dembo
- Doctoral students: Nina Holden; Xin Sun
- Website: math.mit.edu/~sheffield/

Scott Sheffield is a professor of mathematics at the Massachusetts Institute of Technology. His primary research field is theoretical probability.

== Research ==
Much of Sheffield's work examines conformal invariant objects which arise in the study of two-dimensional statistical physics models. He studies the Schramm–Loewner evolution SLE(κ) and its relations to a variety of other random objects. For example, he proved that SLE describes the interface between two Liouville quantum gravity surfaces that have been conformally welded together. In joint work with Oded Schramm, he showed that contour lines of the Gaussian free field are related to SLE(4). With Jason Miller, he developed the theory of Gaussian free field flow lines, which include SLE(κ) for all values of κ, as well as many variants of SLE.

Sheffield and Bertrand Duplantier proved the Knizhnik–Polyakov–Zamolodchikov (KPZ) relation for fractal scaling dimensions in Liouville quantum gravity. Sheffield also defined conformal loop ensembles, which serve as scaling limits of the collections of all interfaces in various statistical physics models. In joint work with Wendelin Werner, he described the conformal loop ensembles as the outer boundaries of clusters of Brownian loops.

In addition to these contributions, Sheffield has also proved results regarding internal diffusion-limited aggregation, dimers, game theory, partial differential equations, and Lipschitz extension theory.

== Teaching ==
Since 2011, Sheffield has taught 18.600 (formerly 18.440), the introductory probability course at MIT.

Sheffield was a visiting professor at the Institute for Advanced Study for the 2022 to 2023 academic year.

== Education and career ==
Sheffield graduated from Harvard University in 1998 with an A.B. and A.M. in mathematics. In 2003, he received his Ph.D. in mathematics from Stanford University. Before becoming a professor at MIT, Sheffield held postdoctoral positions at Microsoft Research, the University of California at Berkeley, and the Institute for Advanced Study. He was also an associate professor at New York University.

== Awards ==
Scott Sheffield received the Loève Prize, the Presidential Early Career Award for Scientists and Engineers, the Sloan Research Fellowship, and the Rollo Davidson Prize. He was also an invited speaker at the 2010 meeting of the International Congress of Mathematicians and a plenary speaker in 2022. In 2017 he received the Clay Research Award jointly with Jason Miller. He was elected to the American Academy of Arts and Sciences in 2021. In 2023 he received the Leonard Eisenbud Prize for Mathematics and Physics of the AMS jointly with Jason Miller. In 2024, he received the Henri Poincaré Prize from the International Association of Mathematical Physics.

== Books ==
- Scott Sheffield (2005), Random Surfaces, American Mathematical Society
