= Brownian sheet =

In mathematics, a Brownian sheet or multiparametric Brownian motion is a multiparametric generalization of the Brownian motion to a Gaussian random field. This means we generalize the "time" parameter $t$ of a Brownian motion $B_t$ from $\R_{+}$ to $\R_{+}^n$.

The exact dimension $n$ of the space of the new time parameter varies from authors. We follow John B. Walsh and define the $(n,d)$-Brownian sheet, while some authors define the Brownian sheet specifically only for $n=2$, what we call the $(2,d)$-Brownian sheet.

This definition is due to Nikolai Chentsov, there exist a slightly different version due to Paul Lévy.

== (n,d)-Brownian sheet ==
A $d$-dimensional gaussian process $B=(B_t,t\in \mathbb{R}_+^n)$ is called a $(n,d)$-Brownian sheet if

- it has zero mean, i.e. $\mathbb{E}[B_t]=0$ for all $t=(t_1,\dots t_n)\in \mathbb{R}_+^n$
- for the covariance function

$$\operatorname{cov}(B_s^{(i)},B_t^{(j)})=\begin{cases}
\prod\limits_{l=1}^n \operatorname{min} (s_l,t_l) & \text{if }i=j,\\
0 &\text{else}
\end{cases}$$

for $1\leq i,j\leq d$.

=== Properties ===
From the definition follows

$$B(0,t_2,\dots,t_n)=B(t_1,0,\dots,t_n)=\cdots=B(t_1,t_2,\dots,0)=0$$

almost surely.

=== Examples ===
- $(1,1)$-Brownian sheet is the Brownian motion in $\mathbb{R}^1$.
- $(1,d)$-Brownian sheet is the Brownian motion in $\mathbb{R}^d$.
- $(2,1)$-Brownian sheet is a multiparametric Brownian motion $X_{t,s}$ with index set $(t,s)\in [0,\infty)\times [0,\infty)$.

=== Lévy's definition of the multiparametric Brownian motion ===
In Lévy's definition one replaces the covariance condition above with the following condition

$$\operatorname{cov}(B_s,B_t)=\frac{(|t|+|s|-|t-s|)}{2}$$

where $|\cdot|$ is the Euclidean metric on $\R^n$.

== Existence of abstract Wiener measure ==
Consider the space $\Theta^{\frac{n+1}{2}}(\mathbb R^n;\R)$ of continuous functions of the form $f:\mathbb R^n\to\mathbb R$ satisfying
$$\lim\limits_{|x|\to \infty}\left(\log(e+|x|)\right)^{-1}|f(x)|=0.$$
This space becomes a separable Banach space when equipped with the norm
$$\|f\|_{\Theta^{\frac{n+1}{2}}(\mathbb R^n;\R)} := \sup_{x\in\mathbb R^n}\left(\log(e+|x|)\right)^{-1}|f(x)|.$$

Notice this space includes densely the space of zero at infinity $C_0(\mathbb{R}^n;\mathbb{R})$ equipped with the uniform norm, since one can bound the uniform norm with the norm of $\Theta^{\frac{n+1}{2}}(\mathbb R^n;\R)$ from above through the Fourier inversion theorem.

Let $\mathcal{S}'(\mathbb{R}^{n};\mathbb{R})$ be the space of tempered distributions. One can then show that there exist a suitable separable Hilbert space (and Sobolev space)

$$H^\frac{n+1}{2}(\mathbb R^n,\mathbb R)\subseteq \mathcal{S}'(\mathbb{R}^{n};\mathbb{R})$$

that is continuously embbeded as a dense subspace in $C_0(\mathbb{R}^n;\mathbb{R})$ and thus also in $\Theta^{\frac{n+1}{2}}(\mathbb R^n;\mathbb{R})$ and that there exist a probability measure $\omega$ on $\Theta^{\frac{n+1}{2}}(\mathbb R^n;\mathbb{R})$ such that the triple
$$(H^{\frac{n+1}{2}}(\mathbb R^n;\mathbb{R}),\Theta^{\frac{n+1}{2}}(\mathbb R^n;\mathbb{R}),\omega)$$
is an abstract Wiener space.

A path $\theta \in \Theta^{\frac{n+1}{2}}(\mathbb{R}^n;\mathbb{R})$ is $\omega$-almost surely

- Hölder continuous of exponent $\alpha \in (0,1/2)$
- nowhere Hölder continuous for any $\alpha> 1/2$.

This handles of a Brownian sheet in the case $d=1$. For higher dimensional $d$, the construction is similar.

== See also ==
- Gaussian free field

== Literature ==
- Stroock, Daniel (2011), Probability theory: an analytic view (2nd ed.), Cambridge.
- Walsh, John B. (1986). An introduction to stochastic partial differential equations. Springer Berlin Heidelberg. ISBN 978-3-540-39781-6.
- Khoshnevisan, Davar. Multiparameter Processes: An Introduction to Random Fields. Springer. ISBN 978-0387954592.
