= Tianyi Zheng =

Chinese-American mathematician

- Education: Tsinghua University (BS); Cornell University (PhD)
- Scientific career
- Institutions: University of California, San Diego
- Thesis: Random Walks On Some Classes Of Solvable Groups (2013)
- Doctoral advisor: Laurent Saloff-Coste

Tianyi Zheng is a Chinese-American mathematician specializing in geometric group theory and probability theory, including the theory of random walks and harmonic functions on groups. She is a professor of mathematics at the University of California, San Diego.

== Education and career ==
Zheng was an undergraduate mathematics student at Tsinghua University, graduating in 2008. She completed a Ph.D. in 2013 at Cornell University, with the dissertation Random Walks On Some Classes Of Solvable Groups advised by Laurent Saloff-Coste.

She became a postdoctoral Szegő Assistant Professor at Stanford University from 2013 to 2016 before obtaining a regular-rank faculty position as assistant professor at the University of California, San Diego in 2016.

== Recognition ==
Zheng was named a Sloan Research Fellow in 2019. She was an invited speaker in mathematical analysis at the 2022 (virtual) International Congress of Mathematicians.

In 2024, she was a recipient of the Rollo Davidson Prize, given "for her deep results and resolution of long-standing conjectures on random walks on groups".
