= Neil O'Connell =

Irish mathematician

- Born: Ireland
- Education: UC Berkeley (PhD, 1993); Trinity College Dublin (B.A. (mod) 1989, M.Sc. 1990)
- Awards: Itô Prize (2002); Rollo Davidson Prize (2005)
- Scientific career
- Fields: Mathematics
- Workplaces: Dublin Institute for Advanced Studies; University of Warwick; University College Dublin
- Thesis: The Genealogy of Branching Processes (1993)
- Doctoral advisor: Steven Neil Evans

Neil Michael O'Connell is an Irish mathematician from Shannon, County Clare. He attended Trinity College Dublin and was elected a Scholar in 1987. He earned his bachelor's degree in mathematics and a gold medal in 1989 and completed an M.Sc. in 1990. He obtained his PhD in 1993 at UC Berkeley under the supervision of Steven Neil Evans. He subsequently worked at the Dublin Institute for Advanced Studies, and the University of Warwick.

He works in probability theory, in particular random matrices. He was awarded the inaugural Itô prize in 2002 (together with Ben Hambly and James Martin), and the Rollo Davidson Prize in 2005. In 2013 he was Doob Lecturer at the 36th Conference on Stochastic Processes and Their Applications, in Boulder, Colorado. He is currently Professor at University College Dublin.
