= Nina Holden =

Norwegian mathematician

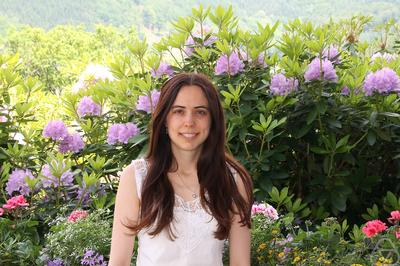
- Holden in Oberwolfach, 2017
- Born: c. 1986 (age 39–40)
- Education: Massachusetts Institute of Technology
- Relatives: Helge Holden (uncle)
- Awards: Maryam Mirzakhani New Frontiers Prize (2021); Rollo Davidson Prize (2023); EMS Prize (2024)
- Scientific career
- Fields: Mathematics
- Thesis: Cardy embedding of random planar maps and a KPZ formula for mated trees (2018)
- Doctoral advisor: Scott Sheffield

Nina Holden is a Norwegian mathematician interested in probability theory and stochastic processes, including graphons, random planar maps, the Schramm–Loewner evolution, and their applications to quantum gravity. She was a Junior Fellow at the Institute for Theoretical Studies at ETH Zurich, and is currently an associate professor at the Courant Institute of Mathematical Sciences of New York University.

== Education ==
As a student at Berg Upper Secondary School in Oslo, Norway, Holden became the first woman to win the Abel competition, Norway's national Mathematical Olympiad. She competed in 2005 in the International Mathematical Olympiad, where she earned an honorable mention with one of the two top scores on the Norwegian team.

She became a student at the University of Oslo in Norway, where she earned a bachelor's degree in mathematics and computational science in 2008 and a master's degree in applied mathematics in 2010. While a student in Oslo, she also visited the University of Oxford from 2006 to 2007.

After three years of work as an energy market analyst, she went to the Massachusetts Institute of Technology for graduate study, and completed her Ph.D. there in 2018. Her dissertation, Cardy embedding of random planar maps and a KPZ formula for mated trees, was supervised by Scott Sheffield.

== Recognition ==
In association with the 2021 Breakthrough Prizes, Holden was awarded one of three 2021 Maryam Mirzakhani New Frontiers Prizes, for early-career achievements by a woman mathematician. The citation reads: "for work in random geometry, particularly on Liouville Quantum Gravity as a scaling limit of random triangulations." The particular work refers to her joint work with Xin Sun on the convergence of uniform triangulations under a conformal embedding. The other two winners of the prize were Urmila Mahadev and Lisa Piccirillo. She received the 2022 Viggo Brun Prize of the Norwegian Mathematical Society, "for her exceptionally deep and broad contributions to probability theory, especially for her work on random surfaces and quantum gravity in two dimensions". In 2023, she was a recipient of the Rollo Davidson Prize, and in the following year, she was awarded the EMS Prize "for her profound contributions to probability theory and its applications to statistical physics, including results linking Liouville quantum gravity, the Schramm-Loewner evolution, and random triangulations".

Holden was elected to the Norwegian Academy of Science and Letters in 2026.

== Personal life ==
Holden's mother, Marit Holden, is the Chief Research Scientist at the Norwegian Computing Center. Her father, Lars Holden, was its managing director from 2001 to 2022 and is the brother of Helge Holden.
