= Rollo Davidson =

British mathematician (1944–1970)

Rollo Davidson (8 October 1944 – 29 July 1970) was a probabilist, alpinist, and Fellow-elect of Churchill College, Cambridge, who died aged 25 on Piz Bernina. He is known for his work on semigroups, stochastic geometry, and stochastic analysis, and for the Rollo Davidson Prize, given in his name to early-career probabilists.

== Life ==
Davidson was born in Bristol. At the time of his birth, his parents lived in The Chantry, Thornbury, Gloucestershire. His mother was Priscilla (née Chilver); his father, Brian Davidson, won a prize at Oxford for his study of classics, was president of the Oxford Union, and worked as a solicitor before becoming an executive with the Bristol Aeroplane Company. Rollo Davidson attended Winchester College before studying mathematics at Trinity College, Cambridge, from 1962 and becoming a research fellow there in 1967. He completed his PhD in 1968, under the supervision of David George Kendall. He continued at Cambridge as assistant lecturer, lecturer, and in 1970 fellow-elect. He died in a mountain climbing accident on the slopes of Piz Bernina in 1970.

== Contributions ==
In stochastic geometry, Davidson is known for introducing the study of line processes, which he modelled as point processes on spaces of parameters of lines. The second winner of the Rollo Davidson Prize, Olav Kallenberg, won the prize for settling (negatively) a conjecture on line processes posed by Davidson in his thesis.

In stochastic analysis, also, Davidson has been described as a "remarkably original mathematician" who left a legacy of "tantalising unsolved problems". He particularly studied Delphic semigroups, a class of topological semigroups introduced by his advisor to study renewal sequences; Ruzsa & Székely (1988) write that, despite the many applications of these semigroups, Davidson was "the only one to contribute seriously to Delphic theory" after Kendall, and that "his untimely death certainly deprived this theory of interesting developments".

== Legacy ==
In 1975 a fund was established at Churchill College in his memory, endowed initially through the publication in his honour of two volumes of papers, edited by E. F. Harding and D. G. Kendall. A prize from the Rollo Davidson Trust Fund has been awarded annually since 1976 to early-career probabilists.

== See also ==
- Jacques Herbrand
