= Sandrine Péché =

French mathematician

Sandrine Péché (born 1977) is a French mathematician who works as a professor in the Laboratoire de Probabilités, Statistique et Modélisation of Paris Diderot University. Her research concerns probability theory, mathematical physics, and the theory and applications of random matrices.

After studying at the École normale supérieure de Cachan, Péché earned a Ph.D. from the École Polytechnique Fédérale de Lausanne in Switzerland, in 2002, under the supervision of Gérard Ben Arous. She taught at the University of Grenoble before moving to Paris Diderot in 2011.

She served as the editor-in-chief of Electronic Communications in Probability from 2015 to 2017. She was an invited speaker at the International Congress of Mathematicians in 2014.
