= Ron Doney =

British mathematician

- Born: Ronald Arthur Doney
- Education: Durham University
- Scientific career
- Fields: Mathematics
- Workplaces: University of Manchester
- Thesis: Some problems on random walks (1964)
- Doctoral advisor: G. E. H. Reuter

Ronald Arthur Doney is a British mathematician. He is Emeritus Professor of Mathematics at the University of Manchester and a specialist in probability theory.

Doney completed his PhD at Durham University in 1964 under the supervision of G. E. H. Reuter. He worked briefly at the University of East Anglia, before joining Imperial College London as a lecturer in 1965. In 1970, he moved to the University of Manchester, where he spent the remainder of his academic career.

In the mid-1970s, Doney published a series of papers on the growth properties of general branching processes, and often collaborated with Nicholas Bingham. From 1977 onward, he returned primarily to the study of random walks.

During the 1990s, he had a 'relatively intense' collaboration with French probabilist Jean Bertoin. This emerged from Bertoin noticing Doney’s 1991 paper on Lévy processes in the Journal of the London Mathematical Society. They eventually co-authored seven papers on conditioned random walks, six of which appeared between 1994 and 1997.

== Selected publications ==
- Bingham, N.H.; Doney, R.A. (1974). "Asymptotic properties of supercritical branching processes I: The Galton–Watson process". Advances in Applied Probability. 6 (4): 711–731. doi:10.2307/1426188.
- Doney, R.A. (1991). "Hitting probabilities for spectrally positive Lévy processes". Journal of the London Mathematical Society. 44 (3): 566–576. doi:10.1112/jlms/s2-44.3.566.
- Bertoin, J.; Doney, R.A. (1994). "On conditioning a random walk to stay nonnegative" (PDF). The Annals of Probability. doi:10.1214/aop/1176988497.
- Bertoin, J.; Doney, R.A. (1996). "Some asymptotic results for transient random walks". Advances in Applied Probability. 28 (1): 207–226. doi:10.2307/1427918.
- Doney, R.A. (2012). "Local behaviour of first passage probabilities" (PDF). Probability Theory and Related Fields. 152: 559–588. doi:10.1007/s00440-010-0330-7.
