= Amol Aggarwal =

American mathematician and mathematical physicist

- Born: 1993
- Citizenship: United States
- Education: Massachusetts Institute of Technology (BSc); Harvard University (PhD)
- Awards: Morgan Prize (2016); Clay Mathematics Fellow (2020); IAMP Early Career Award (2021); Dubrovin Medal (2022); Rollo Davidson Prize (2022); Packard Fellowship (2022)
- Scientific career
- Workplaces: Columbia University (2022); Stanford University (2025)
- Thesis: Asymptotic Phenomena in the Six-Vertex Model
- Doctoral advisor: Alexei Borodin

Amol Aggarwal (born 1993) is an American mathematician and mathematical physicist. His research links combinatorics and probability theory to statistical mechanics. He studies random matrices, examines Gibbs measures for random tessellations, and serves as a professor of mathematics at Stanford University.

== Education and career ==
Aggarwal graduated from the Massachusetts Institute of Technology in 2015. He completed a Ph.D. at Harvard University in 2020. Alexei Borodin supervised his doctoral dissertation. The title was Asymptotic Phenomena in the Six-Vertex Model.

He joined the Columbia University mathematics department in 2020. He started as an assistant professor. The university awarded him tenure in 2022. He became an associate professor. He joined Stanford University in 2025. He now holds a full professor position.

== Recognition ==
Aggarwal attended Saratoga High School in California. He became a finalist in the Intel Science Talent Search in 2011. His project dealt with discrete geometry. It improved an upper bound by Zoltán Füredi. Paul Erdős and Leo Moser posed the question in 1959. He published the results in 2015. Officials named minor planet 27072 Aggarwal after him. He received the Morgan Prize in 2016.

Aggarwal received a Clay Mathematics Fellowship in 2020. He won the IAMP Early Career Award in 2021, and gained the Dubrovin Medal in 2022. The award came for contributions to integrable probability and random matrix theory. He also won the Rollo Davidson Prize in 2022. The Packard Fellowship came to him in 2022, providing support over five years. He serves as an invited speaker at the 2026 International Congress of Mathematicians.

== Personal life ==
Aggarwal was born in 1993. He is the son of Alok Aggarwal, a theoretical computer scientist and entrepreneur (one of the namesakes of the SMAWK algorithm), and of Sangeeta Aggarwal, a hematologist and oncologist. His parents immigrated from India.
