= Jie-zhong Zou =

- Born: October 15, 1947 (age 78)
- Education: Central South University
- Occupation: Mathematician

Jie-zhong Zou (born October 15, 1947) is a mathematician known for his research on mathematical probability theory and its applications, in particular in topics such as homogeneous Markov chains, queuing theory and mathematical finance. He entered Changsha Railway Institute (Central South University now) in 1980 and received his Ph.D. at the Changsha Railway Institute in 1987 under advisor Zhen-ting Hou. Since 1987 Jie-zhong Zou has been on the faculty at Changsha Railway Institute (Central South University now).

He was awarded the Rollo Davidson Prize in 1987, and was elected a Fellow of the Chinese Mathematical Society.

He attended the International Congress of Mathematician in Beijing in 2002.

== Papers ==
- Jie-zhong Zou, "The oscillation problem for p-functions". D.Phil. Thesis, Changsha Railway Institute 1986 (Chinese).
- Jie-zhong Zou, "Some New Inequalities for p-Functions ". Journal of the London Mathematical Society 1988 s2-38(2):356-366.
