= Jason P. Miller =

American mathematician (born 1983)

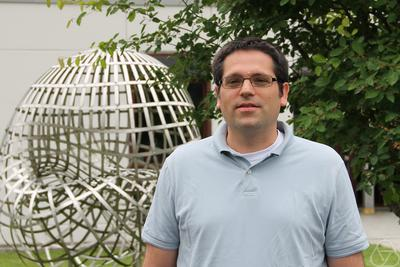
Miller at Oberwolfach in 2024

Jason Peter Miller (born November 23, 1983) is an American mathematician, specializing in probability theory.

After graduating from Okemos High School, Miller matriculated in 2002 at the University of Michigan, where he graduated in 2006 with a B.S. with joint majors in mathematics, computer science, and economics. In 2006 he became a graduate student in mathematics at Stanford University. In 2011 he graduated there with a PhD supervised by Amir Dembo with dissertation Limit theorems for Ginzburg–Landau $\nabla \varphi$ random surfaces . Miller was a summer intern in 2009 at Microsoft Research and in 2010 at D.E. Shaw & Co. He was a postdoctoral researcher from September 2010 to July 2012 at Microsoft and from July 2012 to July 2015 (as a Schramm Fellow and a NSF Fellow) at MIT's department of mathematics, where he worked with Scott Sheffield. In 2015 Miller became a reader at Trinity College, Cambridge and in the University of Cambridge's Statistics Laboratory.

His research deals with many aspects of probability theory, including "stochastic interface models (random surfaces and SLE), random walk, mixing times for Markov chains, and interacting particle systems."

With Scott Sheffield, he did research on the geometry of d-dimensional Gaussian free fields (GFF fields), also called (Euclidean bosonic) massless free fields, which are d-dimensional analogs of Brownian motion. The two mathematicians introduced an "imaginary geometry" which made it possible to integrate the Schramm–Loewner evolution in many GFF fields. Miller and Sheffield also proved that two models of measure-endowed random surfaces, namely Liouville quantum gravity and the Brownian map, are equivalent. (The two models were introduced by Alexander Markovich Polyakov.)

Miller won the Rollo Davidson Prize in 2015, the Whitehead Prize in 2016, the Clay Research Award in 2017 (with Scott Sheffield), and the Doeblin Prize in 2018. He was an invited speaker with talk Liouville quantum gravity as a metric space and a scaling limit at the International Congress of Mathematicians in 2018 in Rio de Janeiro. He was awarded the Leonard Eisenbud Prize for Mathematics and Physics of the AMS in 2023 jointly with Scott Sheffield. In 2023 he received the Fermat Prize and he was elected a Fellow of the Royal Society in 2025.

== Selected publications ==
- Miller, Jason; Sheffield, Scott (19 July 2019). "Liouville quantum gravity and the Brownian map I: the QLE(8/3,0) metric". Inventiones Mathematicae. 219 (1). Springer Science and Business Media LLC: 75–152. arXiv:1507.00719. doi:10.1007/s00222-019-00905-1. hdl:1721.1/126710. ISSN 0020-9910. S2CID 199687114.
- Miller, Jason; Sheffield, Scott (1 November 2021). "Liouville quantum gravity and the Brownian map II: Geodesics and continuity of the embedding". The Annals of Probability. 49 (6). Institute of Mathematical Statistics. arXiv:1605.03563. doi:10.1214/21-aop1506. ISSN 0091-1798. S2CID 119140303.
- Miller, Jason; Sheffield, Scott (15 November 2016). "Quantum Loewner evolution". Duke Mathematical Journal. 165 (17). Duke University Press. arXiv:1312.5745. doi:10.1215/00127094-3627096. hdl:1721.1/116004. ISSN 0012-7094. S2CID 119305882.
- Miller, Jason; Sheffield, Scott (16 June 2017). "Imaginary geometry IV: interior rays, whole-plane reversibility, and space-filling trees". Probability Theory and Related Fields. 169 (3–4). Springer Science and Business Media LLC: 729–869. arXiv:1302.4738. doi:10.1007/s00440-017-0780-2. hdl:1721.1/135730. ISSN 0178-8051. S2CID 119014687.
