= Grégory Miermont =

French mathematician (born 1979)

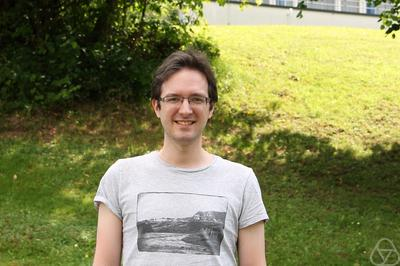
- Miermont in Oberwolfach, 2017
- Born: 16 July 1979 (age 47); Paris, France
- Education: École Normale Supérieure, Pierre and Marie Curie University
- Known for: Random planar maps, Random trees
- Awards: Prize of the Fondation des Sciences Mathématiques de Paris (2007); Rollo Davidson Prize (2009); EMS Prize (2012); Doeblin Prize (2014)
- Scientific career
- Fields: Mathematics
- Workplaces: École normale supérieure de Lyon; Institut Universitaire de France
- Doctoral advisor: Jean Bertoin
- Website: perso.ens-lyon.fr/gregory.miermont/

Grégory Miermont (born 16 July 1979) is a French mathematician working on probability, random trees and random maps.

== Biography ==
After high school, Miermont trained for two years at Classe préparatoire aux grandes écoles at the end of which he was admitted at the École normale supérieure in Paris. He studied there from 1998 to 2002, spending the 2001–2002 year as a visiting student in Berkeley. He received his doctorate at Pierre and Marie Curie University in 2003, under the supervision of Jean Bertoin. Then, he became a CNRS researcher in 2004 at University of Paris-Sud and École normale supérieure, and was promoted to the rank of professor in 2009. Since 2012 he is a professor at the École normale supérieure de Lyon.

== Work ==
Miermont worked on the theory of probability, more precisely on the geometry and scaling limits of random planar maps, and on fragmentation related to random trees.

== Awards and honors ==
=== Diplomas, titles and awards ===
- 2003: PhD Thesis (advisor J. Bertoin)
- 2008: Habilitation dissertation
- 2007: Prize of the Fondation des Sciences Mathématiques de Paris
- 2009: Rollo Davidson Prize
- 2012: Prize of the European Mathematical Society
- 2014: Doeblin Prize
- 2015: Medallion lecturer: Compact Brownian Surfaces

== Selected writings ==
- G. Miermont, Self-similar fragmentations derived from the stable tree. I. Splitting at heights, Probab. Theory Related Fields, 127 (2003), pp. 423–454 doi:10.1007/s00440-003-0295-x.
- B. Haas and G. Miermont, The genealogy of self-similar fragmentations with negative index as a continuum random tree, Electron. J. Probab., 9 (2004), pp. no. 4, 57–97 doi:10.1214/EJP.v9-187.
- G. Miermont, Tessellations of random maps of arbitrary genus, Ann. Scient. Ec. Norm. Supér. 42, fascicule 5, 725–781 (2009). URL
- G. Miermont, "The Brownian map is the scaling limit of uniform random plane quadrangulations". Acta Math. 210, 319–401 (2013) doi:10.1007/s11511-013-0096-8.
