= Isoperimetric dimension =

Concept in topology

In mathematics, the isoperimetric dimension of a manifold is a notion of dimension that tries to capture how the large-scale behavior of the manifold resembles that of a Euclidean space (unlike the topological dimension or the Hausdorff dimension which compare different local behaviors against those of the Euclidean space).

In the Euclidean space, the isoperimetric inequality says that of all bodies with the same volume, the ball has the smallest surface area. In other manifolds it is usually very difficult to find the precise body minimizing the surface area, and this is not what the isoperimetric dimension is about. The question we will ask is, what is approximately the minimal surface area, whatever the body realizing it might be.

== Formal definition ==
We say about a differentiable manifold M that it satisfies a d-dimensional isoperimetric inequality if for any open set D in M with a smooth boundary one has

$$\operatorname{area}(\partial D)\geq C\operatorname{vol}(D)^{(d-1)/d}.$$

The notations vol and area refer to the regular notions of volume and surface area on the manifold, or more precisely, if the manifold has n topological dimensions then vol refers to n-dimensional volume and area refers to (n − 1)-dimensional volume. C here refers to some constant, which does not depend on D (it may depend on the manifold and on d).

The isoperimetric dimension of M is the supremum of all values of d such that M satisfies a d-dimensional isoperimetric inequality.

== Examples ==
A d-dimensional Euclidean space has isoperimetric dimension d. This is the well known isoperimetric problem — as discussed above, for the Euclidean space the constant C is known precisely since the minimum is achieved for the ball.

An infinite cylinder (i.e. a product of the circle and the line) has topological dimension 2 but isoperimetric dimension 1. Indeed, multiplying any manifold with a compact manifold does not change the isoperimetric dimension (it only changes the value of the constant C). Any compact manifold has isoperimetric dimension 0.

It is also possible for the isoperimetric dimension to be larger than the topological dimension. The simplest example is the infinite jungle gym, which has topological dimension 2 and isoperimetric dimension 3. See for pictures and Mathematica code.

The hyperbolic plane has topological dimension 2 and isoperimetric dimension infinity. In fact the hyperbolic plane has positive Cheeger constant. This means that it satisfies the inequality

$$\operatorname{area}(\partial D)\geq C\operatorname{vol}(D),$$

which obviously implies infinite isoperimetric dimension.

== Consequences of isoperimetry ==
A simple integration over r (or sum in the case of graphs) shows that a d-dimensional isoperimetric inequality implies a d-dimensional volume growth, namely

$$\operatorname{vol} B(x,r)\geq Cr^d$$

where B(x,r) denotes the ball of radius r around the point x in the Riemannian distance or in the graph distance. In general, the opposite is not true, i.e. even uniformly exponential volume growth does not imply any kind of isoperimetric inequality. A simple example can be had by taking the graph Z (i.e. all the integers with edges between n and n + 1) and connecting to the vertex n a complete binary tree of height |n|. Both properties (exponential growth and 0 isoperimetric dimension) are easy to verify.

An interesting exception is the case of groups. It turns out that a group with polynomial growth of order d has isoperimetric dimension d. This holds both for the case of Lie groups and for the Cayley graph of a finitely generated group.

A theorem of Varopoulos connects the isoperimetric dimension of a graph to the rate of escape of random walk on the graph. The result states

Varopoulos' theorem: If G is a graph satisfying a d-dimensional isoperimetric inequality then

$$p_n(x,y)\leq Cn^{-d/2}$$

where $p_n(x,y)$ is the probability that a random walk on G starting from x will be in y after n steps, and C is some constant.
