= Nicholas Varopoulos =

Greek mathematician (born 1940)

Nicholas Theodore Varopoulos (Greek: Νικόλαος Βαρόπουλος, Nikolaos Varopoulos, also Nicolas Varopoulos; born 16 June 1940) is a Greek mathematician, who works on harmonic analysis and especially analysis on Lie groups.

Varopoulos is the son of the Thessaloniki mathematics professor Theodore Varopoulos (1894–1957). Nicholas Varopoulos received his PhD in 1965 from Cambridge University under John Hunter Williamson. There he was in 1965 a lecturer in mathematics. In the academic year 1966–1967 he was at the Institute for Advanced Study in Princeton, New Jersey. Varopoulos became a professor at the Université Pierre et Marie Curie (Université Paris VI).

In 1968 Varopoulos became the first recipient of the Salem Prize. In 1990 he was an invited speaker at the International Congress of Mathematicians in Kyoto (Analysis and geometry on groups) and in 1970 in Nice (Groupes des fonctions continues en analyse harmoniques). His doctoral students include Thomas William Körner and Laurent Saloff-Coste.

== Publications ==
- "Tensor analysis and harmonic analysis". Acta Mathematica. 119 (1): 51–112. 1967. doi:10.1007/bf02392079.
- with D. L. Salinger: Salinger, D. L.; Varopoulos, N. TH (1969). "Convolutions of measures and sets of analyticity". Math. Scand. 25 (1): 5–18. doi:10.7146/math.scand.a-10935. JSTOR 24489805.
- Varopoulos, N. Th. (1970). "Groups of continuous functions in harmonic analysis". Acta Mathematica. 125: 109–152. doi:10.1007/BF02392332.
- "Sur le réunion de deux ensembles de Helson Sér. A–B". C. R. Acad. Sci. Paris. 271: 251–253. 1970.
- Varopoulos, Nicolas (1976). "Une remarque sur les ensembles de Helson". Duke Math. J. 43 (2): 387–390. doi:10.1215/s0012-7094-76-04334-9. MR 0405002.
- "BMO functions and the ∂-equation". Pacific J. Math. 71 (1): 221–273. 1977. doi:10.2140/pjm.1977.71.221. MR 0508035.
- "A remark on functions of bounded mean oscillation and bounded harmonic functions. Addendum to "BMO functions and the ∂-equation"". Pacific J. Math. 74 (1): 257–259. 1978. doi:10.2140/pjm.1978.74.257. MR 0508036.
- Varopoulos, Nicholas (1980). "Zeros of H^{p} functions in several complex variables". Pacific J. Math. 88 (1): 189–246. doi:10.2140/pjm.1980.88.189. MR 0595819.
- Varopoulos, Nicholas (1980). "A probabilistic proof of the Garnett-Jones theorem on BMO". Pacific J. Math. 90 (1): 201–221. doi:10.2140/pjm.1980.90.201. MR 0599332.
- Varopoulos, N.Th (1985). "Isoperimetric inequalities and Markov chains". J. Funct. Anal. 63 (2): 215–239. doi:10.1016/0022-1236(85)90086-2.
- with Laurent Saloff-Coste, Thierry Coulhon: Analysis and Geometry on Groups. Cambridge University Press, 1992

== See also ==
- Varopoulos's theorem in isoperimetry
