= Patrick Billingsley =

American mathematician

Patrick P. Billingsley
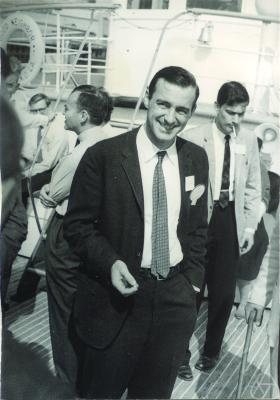
- Billingsley in 1961
- Born: May 3, 1925; Sioux Falls, South Dakota, US
- Died: April 22, 2011 (aged 85); Chicago, Illinois, US
- Education: United States Naval Academy (BS); Princeton University (PhD)
- Scientific career
- Fields: Statistics
- Workplaces: University of Chicago
- Doctoral advisor: William Feller
- Doctoral students: Rabi Bhattacharya; William A. Dembski

Patrick Paul Billingsley (May 3, 1925 – April 22, 2011) was an American mathematician noted for his books in advanced probability theory and statistics.

== Academic career ==
Billingsley was born and raised in Sioux Falls, South Dakota, and graduated from the United States Naval Academy in 1946. After earning a Ph.D. in mathematics at Princeton University in 1955, he was attached to the NSA until his discharge from the Navy in 1957. In 1958 he became a professor of mathematics and statistics at the University of Chicago, where he served as chair of the Department of Statistics from 1980 to 1983, and retired in 1994. In 1964–65 he was a Fulbright Fellow and visiting professor at the University of Copenhagen. In 1971–72 he was a Guggenheim Fellow and visiting professor at the University of Cambridge (Peterhouse). From 1976 to 1979 he edited the Annals of Probability. In 1983 he was president of the Institute of Mathematical Statistics. He was given the Lester R. Ford Award for his article "Prime Numbers and Brownian Motion." He was elected a Fellow of the American Academy of Arts and Sciences in 1986.

In Young Men and Fire, fellow University of Chicago professor Norman Maclean wrote about Billingsley that "he is a distinguished statistician and one of the best amateur actors I have ever seen".

== Books ==
- Statistical Inference for Markov Processes (1961)
- Ergodic Theory and Information (1965)
- Convergence of Probability Measures (1st Edition 1968, 2nd Edition 1999)
- The Elements of Statistical Inference (with David L. Huntsberger, 1986)
- Probability and Measure (1st Edition 1976, 2nd Edition 1986, 3rd Edition, 1995, Anniversary Edition 2012 )

== Stage plays ==
- Three Magic Keys, Taliesin (1964)
- The Pirates of Penzance, Pirate (1966)
- Read Me a Story (1966)
- Clue of the Circus Clowns, Circus Master (1968)
- Finian's Rainbow, Buzz Collins (1968)
- Beadle-Levi Show (parody of The Homecoming) (1968)
- Guys and Dolls, Arvide Abernathy (1969)
- We Bombed in New Haven (Court Theatre, 1970)
- Victorian Children (1970)
- Vaudeville Show, singer (1970)
- The Threepenny Opera, street singer (1970)
- Four Plays of Fantasy and the Unusual (1970)
- Moulin Rouge (1971)
- Oh, What a Lovely War! (1973)
- Midsummer Night's Dream, Theseus (Court Theatre, 1973)
- The Caretaker, Aston (Court Theatre, 1973)
- The Father, The Captain (1974)
- Murder in the Cathedral, First Knight (1974)
- Twelfth Night, Feste (Court Theatre, 1974)
- The Same Room, Tom Ferris (1975)
- Dracula, Dr. Seward (1975)
- Much Ado about Nothing, Balthazar and Friar Frances (Court Theatre, 1975)
- Exits and Entrances (1976)
- Trifles, Sheriff Peters (1976)
- The Lover, Richard-Max (Court Theatre, 1977)
- The Tempest, Alonzo (Court Theatre, 1977)
- She Stoops to Conquer, Mr. Hardcastle (Court Theatre, 1978)
- Measure for Measure, The Duke (Court Theatre, 1979)
- Mrs. Warren's Profession, Rev. Samuel Gardiner (Court Theatre, 1980)
- Equus, Dr. Dysart (Court Theatre, 1980)
- The Seagull, Sorin (Court Theatre, 1981)
- Twelfth Night, Antonio (Body Politic Theatre, 1981)
- Under Milk Wood, Rev. Eli Jenkins et al. (Court Theatre, 1982)
- The First Night of Pygmalion, Beerbohm-Tree et al. (Court Theatre, 1982)
- Midsummer Night's Dream, Peter Quince (Court Theatre, 1983)
- Much Ado about Nothing, Leonato (Court Theatre, 1984)
- Heartbreak House, Mazzini Dunn (Court Theatre, 1985)
- Every Good Boy Deserves Favor, KGB colonel (Court Theatre, 1985)
- The Birthday Party, Petey (1978 and 1985)
- Arms and the Man, Major Petkoff (Court Theatre, 1985)
- Moonlight Daring Us to Go Insane, J. Earl Sheets (Body Politic Theatre, 1987)
- Coastal Disturbances, R. Hamilton Adams (Body Politic Theatre, 1987)

== Films ==
- The Fury (1978) - CIA agent Lander
- My Bodyguard (1980) - Biology Teacher
- Somewhere in Time (1980) - Professor
- One More Saturday Night (1985) - Mr. McGrath
- The Untouchables (1987) - Bailiff #2

== Television ==
- Dummy (1978, TV Movie) - Dr. Morris
- Flesh and Blood (1978) - Boxing official
- The Children Nobody Wanted (1981) - Preacher
- The Dollmaker (1983) - Cooper
- The Last Leaf – A Parable of Easter (1983, Short) - Dr. Winchester
- The Private Eye (1983) - Guard
- Murder Ordained (1986) - Ray Call
- Jack and Mike (episode) (1986) - Judge
- Sable (1987) - Sullivan
- The Father Clements Story (1987, TV Movie) - Father Donovan (final film role)

== Death ==
He died in 2011, aged 85, in his Hyde Park, Chicago home. He was survived by his children, Franny, Patty, Julie, Marty and Paul, and his companion, Florence Weisblatt. His wife of nearly 50 years, social activist Ruth Billingsley, died in 2000.
