= Sourav Chatterjee =

Indian mathematician (born 1979)

Sourav Chatterjee FRS
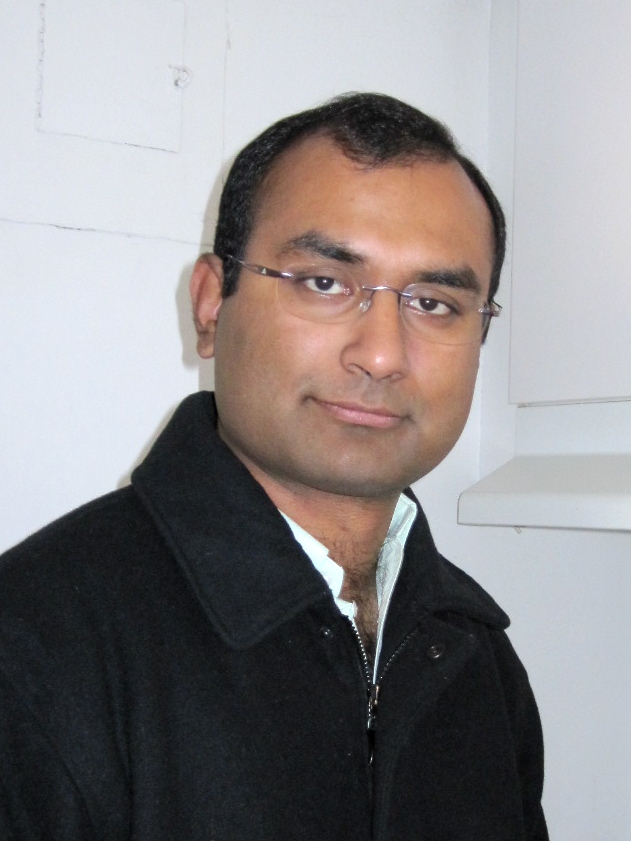
- Chatterjee in 2010
- Born: 26 November 1979 (age 46); Calcutta, West Bengal, India
- Education: Indian Statistical Institute; Stanford University
- Awards: Sloan Research Fellowship (2007); Rollo Davidson Prize (2010); Doeblin Prize (2012); Loève Prize (2013); Infosys Prize (2020)
- Scientific career
- Fields: Mathematics
- Workplaces: Stanford University; University of California at Berkeley; New York University (Courant Institute of Mathematical Sciences)
- Doctoral advisor: Persi Diaconis

Sourav Chatterjee FRS (born 26 November 1979) is an Indian mathematician from West Bengal, specialising in mathematical statistics and probability theory. Chatterjee is credited with work on the study of fluctuations in random structures, concentration and super-concentration inequalities, Poisson and other non-normal limits, first-passage percolation, Stein's method and spin glasses. He has received a Sloan Fellowship in mathematics, Tweedie Award, Rollo Davidson Prize, Doeblin Prize, Loève Prize, and Infosys Prize in mathematical sciences. He was an invited speaker at the International Congress of Mathematicians in 2014.

== Career ==
Chatterjee received a Bachelor and Master of Statistics from Indian Statistical Institute, Kolkata, and a Ph.D. from Stanford University in 2005, where he worked under the supervision of Persi Diaconis. Chatterjee joined University of California, Berkeley, as a visiting assistant professor, then received a tenure-track assistant professor position in 2006. In July 2009 he became an associate professor of statistics and mathematics at University of California, Berkeley. Then in September 2009, Chatterjee became an associate professor of mathematics at the Courant Institute of Mathematical Sciences, New York University. He spent the academic year 2012–2013 as a visiting associate professor of mathematics and statistics at Stanford University. Since autumn 2013 he has joined the faculty of Stanford University as a full professor with joint appointments in the departments of Mathematics and Statistics.

He has served as an associate editor of Annals of Probability, Annales de l'Institut Henri Poincaré (B) Probabilities et Statistiques, "Probability Theory and Related Fields". He currently serves as an editor of Communications in Mathematical Physics.

== Awards and honours ==
- 2008 Tweedie New Researcher Award, from the Institute of Mathematical Statistics.
- Sloan Research Fellowship in Mathematics, 2007–2009
- Rollo Davidson Prize 2010
- IMS Medallion Lecture, 2012
- Inaugural Wolfgang Doeblin Prize in Probability, 2012
- Loève Prize 2013
- ICM Invited talk, 2014
- Infosys Prize 2020
- Fellow of the Royal Society 2023
- Fellow of the American Academy of Arts and Sciences 2024
