= Raphaël Cerf =

French mathematician

- Born: 22 July 1969
- Education: École Normale Supérieure
- Awards: EMS Prize (2000); Rollo Davidson Prize (1999)
- Scientific career
- Fields: Mathematics
- Workplaces: Paris-Saclay University
- Doctoral advisor: Alain Berlinet

Raphaël Cerf is a French mathematician at Paris-Saclay University (previously Paris-Sud 11 University). For his contributions to probability theory, he won the Rollo Davidson Prize in 1999, and the EMS Prize in 2000. He was an Invited Speaker at the ICM in 2006 in Madrid.

== Selected works ==
- Raphaël Cerf (15 October 2004). "Le modèle d'Ising et la coexistence des phases". images.math.cnrs.fr.
- The Wulff Crystal in Ising and Percolation models. Springer, Lecture Notes in Mathematics 1878, École d’été de probabilités de Saint-Flour, no. 34, 2004
- On Cramér's Theory in infinite dimensions. Société Mathématique de France, 2007
- Large deviations for three dimensional supercritical percolation. Société Mathématique de France, 2000
