= Marc Yor =

French mathematician (1949–2014)

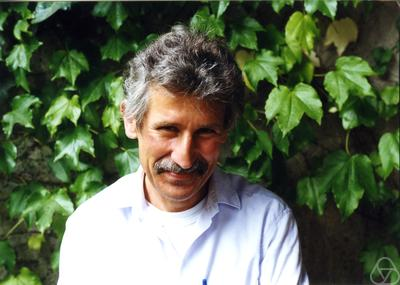
- Born: 24 July 1949
- Died: 9 January 2014 (aged 64); Paris, France
- Education: Ecole Normale Supérieure de Cachan (currently Ecole Normale Supérieure Paris-Saclay)
- Known for: Fine properties of Brownian motion, Bessel processes, Lévy processes
- Awards: Humboldt Prize
- Scientific career
- Fields: Mathematics
- Workplaces: Paris VI University
- Doctoral advisor: Pierre Priouret
- Doctoral students: Dominique Bakry; Jean Bertoin; Philippe Biane; Nathalie Eisenbaum; Jean-François Le Gall

Marc Yor (24 July 1949 – 9 January 2014) was a French mathematician well known for his work on stochastic processes, especially properties of semimartingales, Brownian motion and other Lévy processes, the Bessel processes, and their applications to mathematical finance.

== Background ==
Yor was a professor at the Paris VI University in Paris, France, from 1981 until his death in 2014.

He was a recipient of several awards, including the Humboldt Prize, the Montyon Prize, and was awarded the Ordre National du Merite by the French Republic. He was a member of the French Academy of Sciences. His students include such notable mathematicians as Jean-Francois Le Gall and Jean Bertoin.

He died on 9 January 2014 at the age of 64.

== Bibliography ==
=== Books ===
- Yor, M. (1992). Some Aspects of Brownian Motion. Part I: Some Special Functionals. Birkhäuser.
- Yor, M. (1997). Some Aspects of Brownian Motion. Part II: Some Recent Martingale Problems. Birkhäuser.
- Revuz, D., & Yor, M. (1999). Continuous martingales and Brownian motion. Springer.
- Yor, M. (2001). On Exponential Functionals of Brownian Motion and Related Processes. Springer.
- Emery, M., & Yor, M. (Eds.). (2002). Séminaire de probabilités 1967-1980: a selection in Martingale theory. Springer.
- Chaumont, L. & Yor, M. (2003). Exercises in Probability: A Guided Tour from Measure Theory to Random Processes, via Conditioning. Cambridge University Press.
- Mansuy, R. & Yor, M. (2006). Random Times and Enlargements of Filtrations in a Brownian Setting. Springer.
- Mansuy, R. & Yor, M. (2008). Aspects of Brownian Motion. Springer.
- Roynette, B. & Yor, M. (2009). Penalising Brownian Paths. Springer.
- Jeanblanc, M. & Yor, M., Chesney, M. (2009). Mathematical methods for financial markets. Springer.
- Profeta, C., Roynette, B. & Yor, M. (2010). Option Prices as Probabilities. Springer.
- Hirsch, F., Profeta, C., Roynette, B. & Yor, M. (2011). Peacocks and associated martingales, with explicit constructions. Springer.

=== Main papers ===
- Yor, M. (2001). Bessel processes, Asian options, and perpetuities. In Exponential Functionals of Brownian Motion and Related Processes (pp. 63–92). Springer Berlin Heidelberg.
- Pitman, J., & Yor, M. (1997). The two-parameter Poisson-Dirichlet distribution derived from a stable subordinator. The Annals of Probability, 25(2), 855-900.
- Pitman, J., & Yor, M. (1982). A decomposition of Bessel bridges. Probability Theory and Related Fields, 59(4), 425-457.
