= Richard Kenyon =

American mathematician (born 1964)

Richard W. Kenyon
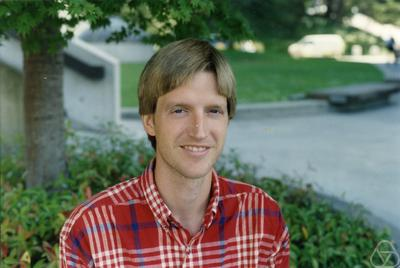
- Kenyon in 1994
- Born: February 27, 1964 (age 62)
- Education: Rice University; Princeton University
- Awards: Rollo Davidson Prize (2001); Loève Prize (2007)
- Scientific career
- Fields: Mathematics
- Workplaces: Yale University
- Doctoral advisor: William Thurston

Richard W. Kenyon (born 1964) is an American mathematician known for his contributions in combinatorics and probability theory. He is the Erastus L. DeForest Professor of Mathematics at Yale University.

Kenyon graduated from Rice University and then earned his PhD under supervision of William Thurston at Princeton University. He won the Rollo Davidson Prize in 2001 and the Loève Prize in 2007. In 2014 Kenyon was chosen as a Simons Investigator and inducted into the American Academy of Arts and Sciences. In 2018, he was an invited speaker at the International Congress of Mathematicians in Rio de Janeiro.
