= Theodoros Varopoulos =

Greek mathematician and professor

Theodoros Varopoulos (Θεόδωρος Βαρόπουλος; 30 January 1884 in Astakos – 14 June 1957 in Thessaloniki) was a Greek mathematician, and a mathematics professor at the University of Athens (1929–1931) and at the Aristotle University of Thessaloniki (1931–1957).

== Education and career ==
Theodoros A. Varopoulos, the son of a poor family, was born three days before the death of his father. The financial support of the family was undertaken by his brother Nikolaos Tzanio, who was a teacher. Theodoros completed his primary education at Zervada and his secondary education in Lefkada.

Despite the financial problems of his family, he left his home territory to study in Athens where he passed an exam at the Military Academy of Flight. However, due to his inability to pay the required registration fee, he enrolled in 1914 in the Mathematical Department of the University of Athens. To earn income in the evenings he worked on the Athens Telegraph. He also worked as a clerk at the University of Athens. Among his professors at the University of Athens were Kyparissos Stefanos, Georgios Remoundos, and Nikolaos Hatzidakis. He graduated with honors in 1918, and in 1919 he was awarded a doctorate in mathematics.

In 1920, after receiving a scholarship from Emmanouíl Benákis, he was sent to Paris to continue his studies. There, by perfecting the theorems of Georgios Remoundos, he began to send scientific papers to the French Academy of Sciences. These works contributed to the decision of University of Paris to give him the possibility of obtaining a doctoral degree on the basis of his dissertation alone, without taking examinations. Eventually, he received a doctorate in 1923, and remained in the school through 1925. At the same time, he continued to publish scientific papers in journals as well as in conferences. He was also very much appreciated by other French mathematicians of the time and, after his return to Greece, he continued to travel yearly to Paris until the start of World War II.

On his return in 1925 from Paris to Greece he worked first as a secondary school teacher at Athens College. In 1927, he was appointed professor of mathematics at the Secondary School of Teaching and in 1929 he was appointed as a professor extraordinarius in higher mathematical analysis at the University of Athens. In 1931 he was appointed professor ordinarius of mathematics at the Aristotle University of Thessaloniki, where he served until his death on 1957 after a long-term illness.

Varopoulos was an invited speaker at the ICM in 1920 in Strasbourg and in 1924 in Toronto. He was a member of the editorial board of the French journal Bulletin de Sciences Mathématiques between September 1927 and October 1928. He also served as an editor for the journal of the Hellenic Mathematical Society. He had a close collaboration with Professor Panagiotis Zervos.

== Personal life ==
In his free time Varopoulos read poetry, particularly French poetry, and especially the poems of Paul Verlaine. He was also engaged in amateur photography. His ironic humor and eccentric character inspired anecdotes. He married Aliki Stini, a graduate in physical sciences, on 21 September 1939. The marriage produced a son, Nikolaos Theodoros Varopoulos, who became a noted mathematician.

== Teaching and legacy ==
Theodoros Varopoulos used literary language in his teaching, and in the process of teaching his students mathematical formulas, he developed philosophical theories. He was strict with his students, but several times he financially assisted the poorest of them. He worked extensively on the development of the mathematical department of the University of Thessaloniki, since he was one of its first professors. Among his students were Nicolas Baganas, later professor of the University of Bordeaux, and Nicos Artemiadis, later professor at the American University.

== Selected publications ==
- "Sur la croissance et les zéros d'une classe de fonctions transcendantes". Thèses de l'entre-deux-guerres (Numdam.org). 38. 1923; 68 page doctoral dissertation
- Varopoulos, Th. (1925). "Sur les valeurs exceptionnelles des fonctions algébroïdes et de leurs dérivées". Bulletin de la Société Mathématique de France. 53: 23–34. doi:10.24033/bsmf.1078.
- Varopoulos, Th. (1927). "Sur les involutions exceptionnelles et les valeurs exceptionnelles des algébroïdes". Bulletin de la Société Mathématique de France. 55: 151–162. doi:10.24033/bsmf.1118.
- Varopoulos, Théodore (1928). "Sur les valeurs exceptionnelles des fonctions dérivées et le théorème de M. Saxer". Acta Mathematica. 51 (1): 23–29. doi:10.1007/BF02545659.
- Varopoulos, Th. (1930). "Sur les algébroïdes Liées algébriquement". Rendiconti del Circolo Matematico di Palermo (1884–1940). 54: 463–472. doi:10.1007/BF03021209. S2CID 119344615.
