= Gaussian random field =

Concept in statistics

In statistics, a Gaussian random field (GRF) is a random field involving Gaussian probability density functions of the variables. A one-dimensional GRF is also called a Gaussian process. An important special case of a GRF is the Gaussian free field.

With regard to applications of GRFs, the initial conditions of physical cosmology generated by quantum mechanical fluctuations during cosmic inflation are thought to be a GRF with a nearly scale invariant spectrum.

== Construction ==
One way of constructing a GRF is by assuming that the field is the sum of a large number of plane, cylindrical or spherical waves with uniformly distributed random phase. Where applicable, the central limit theorem dictates that at any point, the sum of these individual plane-wave contributions will exhibit a Gaussian distribution. This type of GRF is completely described by its power spectral density, and hence, through the Wiener–Khinchin theorem, by its two-point autocorrelation function, which is related to the power spectral density through a Fourier transformation.

Suppose f(x) is the value of a GRF at a point x in some D-dimensional space. If we make a vector of the values of f at N points, x_{1}, ..., x_{N}, in the D-dimensional space, then the vector (f(x_{1}), ..., f(x_{N})) will always be distributed as a multivariate Gaussian.

== See also ==
- Brownian sheet
- Gaussian free field
