= Jean Bertoin =

French mathematician

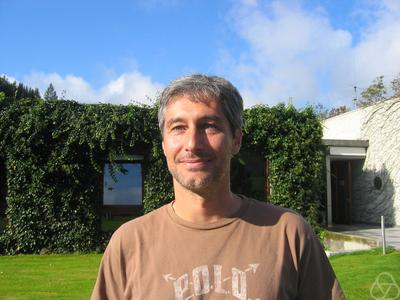
- Bertoin in Oberwolfach, 2007
- Born: 25 May 1961 (age 65)
- Education: University of Paris VI
- Awards: Rollo Davidson Prize (1996)
- Scientific career
- Fields: Probability theory
- Workplaces: University of Zurich
- Thesis: Étude des processus de Dirichlet (1987)
- Doctoral advisor: Marc Yor
- Doctoral students: Bénédicte Haas; Grégory Miermont

Jean Bertoin (born 25 May 1961) is a French mathematician. He is professor at the University of Zurich since 2011.

== Early life and education ==
Bertoin was born in Lyon and completed his undergraduate studies at the École Normale Supérieure of St Cloud. He received his doctorate from University of Paris VI in 1987, having been advised by Marc Yor.

== Career ==
Bertoin is a specialist in probability theory. His research deals with Lévy processes, Brownian motion, branching processes, random fragmentation, and coalescence processes.

In 1988, Bertoin became a researcher at CNRS, and was appointed Professor at Pierre-and-Marie-Curie University in 1992. In the early 1990s he began a collaboration with Ron Doney on the topic of conditioned random walks, with the pair co-writing six papers between 1994 and 1997.

Bertoin has received numerous awards, including the CNRS Bronze Medal (1992), the Rollo Davidson Prize (1996), and the Thérèse Gautier Prize (2015). He was an invited speaker at the ICM (2002) and ECM (2012), and elected a corresponding member of the Mexican Academy of Sciences in 2011.

His doctoral students include Grégory Miermont.

== Selected publications ==
- Lévy processes, Cambridge University Press 1996.
- Random fragmentation and coagulation processes, Cambridge University Press 2006.
- Subordinators: Examples and Applications, in: Jean Bertoin, Fabio Martinelli, Yuval Peres, Lectures on Probability Theory and Statistics, Ecole d’Eté de Probailités de Saint-Flour XXVII - 1997, Lectures Notes in Mathematics 1717, Springer 1999, pp. 1–91. doi:10.1007/978-3-540-48115-7_1
- with Jean-François Le Gall: "The Bolthausen–Sznitman coalescent and the genealogy of continuous-state branching processes." Probability theory and related fields 117, no. 2 (2000): 249–266. doi:10.1007/s004400050006
- Bertoin, Jean (2002). "Self-similar fragmentations". Annales de l'Institut Henri Poincaré B. 38 (3): 319–340. Bibcode:2002AIHPB..38..319B. doi:10.1016/S0246-0203(00)01073-6. S2CID 3246349.
- Bertoin, Jean; Le Gall, Jean-François (2003). "Stochastic flows associated to coalescent processes". Probability Theory and Related Fields. 126 (2): 261–288. doi:10.1007/s00440-003-0264-4. S2CID 32949571.
- with Marc Yor: "Exponential functionals of Lévy processes." Probability Surveys 2 (2005): 191–212. doi:10.1214/154957805100000122
