= Steven Neil Evans =

Australian-American mathematician

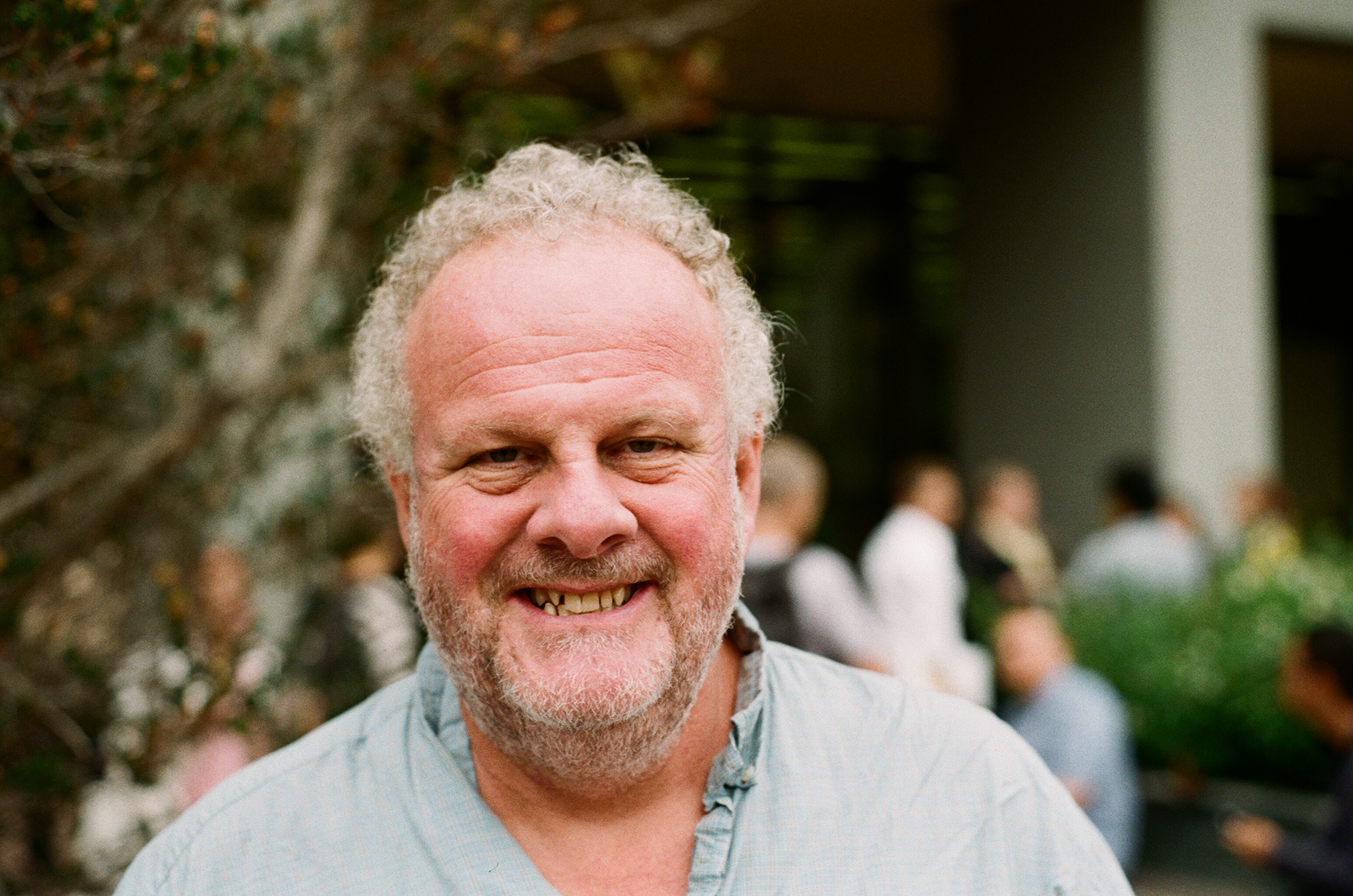
- Evans in 2014
- Born: August 12, 1960 (age 66); Orange, New South Wales, Australia
- Education: University of Sydney; University of Cambridge
- Scientific career
- Workplaces: University of California, Berkeley
- Doctoral advisor: Martin T. Barlow
- Doctoral students: Neil O'Connell
- Website: www.stat.berkeley.edu/~evans/

Steven Neil Evans (born 12 August 1960) is an Australian-American statistician and mathematician, specializing in stochastic processes.

== Education and career ==
Evans was born, Orange, New South Wales. In 1982 he obtained his bachelor's degree from the University of Sydney and in 1987 his Ph.D. from the University of Cambridge under Martin T. Barlow with thesis Local Properties of Markov Families and Stochastic Processes Indexed by a Totally Disconnected Field. From 1987 to 1991 he was an assistant professor of statistics at the University of California, Berkeley. In 1987–1989 he was a Whyburn Research Instructor in mathematics at the University of Virginia. In the department of statistics, UC Berkeley, he became an associate professor in 1991 and a full professor in 1995. In 1999 at UC Berkeley he was given a joint appointment as a professor in both mathematics and statistics, a position he now continues to hold. He was an associate editor from 1993 to 2000 for Stochastic Processes and their Applications, from 1994 to 2000 for Annals of Probability, and from 2001 to 2003 for Probability Theory and Related Fields.

== Honors and awards ==
In 1990 he was awarded the Rollo Davidson Prize. For the academic year 1993–1994 he was awarded a Sloan Fellowship. He was elected a fellow of the Institute of Mathematical Statistics in 1998 and a fellow of the American Mathematical Society in 2012. In 2002 he was a Medallion Lecturer at the Institute of Mathematical Statistics annual meeting in Banff. In 2010 he was an invited speaker at the International Congress of Mathematicians in Hyderabad. In 2016 he was elected to the National Academy of Sciences.

== Selected publications ==
- with T. P. Speed: Evans, Steven N.; Speed, T. P. (1993). "Invariants of some probability models used in phylogenetic inferences". The Annals of Statistics. 21 (1): 355–377. doi:10.1214/aos/1176349030. JSTOR 3035595.
- with Philip B. Stark: Evans, Steven N.; Stark, Philip B. (2002). "Inverse problems as statistics". Inverse Problems. 18 (4): R55–R97. Bibcode:2002InvPr..18..201E. doi:10.1088/0266-5611/18/4/201.
- with Jim Pitman and Anita Winter: Evans, Steven N.; Pitman, Jim; Winter, Anita (2006). "Rayleigh processes, real trees, and root growth with re-grafting". Probab. Theory Relat. Fields. 134 (1): 81–125. arXiv:math/0402293. doi:10.1007/s00440-004-0411-6. S2CID 7319851.
