= Alexei Borodin =

Russian mathematician

- Born: 30 June 1975 (age 51); Donetsk, Ukrainian SSR, Soviet Union
- Education: Moscow State University (1997); University of Pennsylvania
- Awards: EMS Prize (2008); Henri Poincaré Prize (2015); Loève Prize (2015); Fellow, American Academy of Arts and Sciences (2018); Fermat Prize (2019)
- Scientific career
- Fields: Mathematician
- Workplaces: Massachusetts Institute of Technology; California Institute of Technology
- Thesis: Harmonic analysis on the infinite symmetric group (2001)
- Doctoral advisor: Alexandre Kirillov, Grigori Olshanski
- Doctoral students: Amol Aggarwal

Alexei Mikhailovich Borodin (Russian: Алексе́й Михайлович Бороди́н; born 30 June 1975) is a professor of mathematics at the Massachusetts Institute of Technology.

== Research ==
His research concerns asymptotic representation theory, relations with random matrices and integrable systems, and the difference equation formulation of monodromy.

== Education and career ==
Borodin was born in Donetsk, the son of Donetsk State University mathematics professor Mikhail Borodin. He competed for Ukraine in the 1992 International Mathematical Olympiad, earning a silver medal there. In the same year, he began studying mathematics at Moscow State University, and (because of the collapse of the Soviet Union) was forced to choose between Ukrainian and Russian citizenship, deciding at that time to be Russian. He graduated from Moscow State in 1997 and received M.S.E. in computers and information science and Ph.D. in mathematics from the University of Pennsylvania.

He was a Clay Research Fellow and a researcher at the Institute for Advanced Study in Princeton, New Jersey. Next, he taught at the California Institute of Technology from 2003 to 2010, before moving to MIT. In 2016–2017 he was a Fellow at the Radcliffe Institute at Harvard University.

== Awards and honors ==
In 2008, Borodin won the European Mathematical Society Prize, one of ten prizes awarded every four years for excellence by a young mathematics researcher. In 2010, he was one of four Caltech faculty invited to present their work at the International Congress of Mathematicians. In 2015 he won the Loève Prize and the Henri Poincaré Prize. In 2018 he became a Fellow of the American Academy of Arts and Sciences, and in 2019 he was awarded the Fermat Prize.
