= Allan Sly (mathematician) =

Australian mathematician and statistician

Allan Murray Sly is an Australian mathematician and statistician specializing in probability theory. He is a professor of mathematics at Princeton University and was awarded a MacArthur Fellowship in 2018.

== Education and career ==
Sly was a member of the Australian team at the 1999 and 2000 International Mathematical Olympiads, earning an honourable mention and a silver medal respectively. He attended Radford College, where he was dux of the year in 2000. He then studied at Australian National University, winning the University Medal in 2004, earning a bachelor's degree, and in 2006 earning a M.Phil.

He completed his Ph.D. in 2009 at the University of California, Berkeley. His dissertation, Spatial and Temporal Mixing of Gibbs Measures, was supervised by Elchanan Mossel.

After postdoctoral study at Microsoft Research, he joined the statistics faculty at Berkeley in 2011, and moved to Princeton University as a professor of mathematics in 2016.

== Contributions ==
Sly's work has included research on finding clusters in networks, the use of information percolation to analyze the "cutoff" phenomenon in which Markov chains exhibit a sharp transition to their stationary distribution, embeddings of random sequences, and phase transitions for random instances of the satisfiability problem.

== Recognition ==
Sly won a Sloan Research Fellowship in 2012 and was awarded the Rollo Davidson Prize in 2013. He was named a MacArthur Fellow in 2018 for "applying probability theory to resolve long-standing problems in statistical physics and computer science". He was the winner of the 2019 Loeve prize.
