= Alice Guionnet =

French mathematician (born 1969)

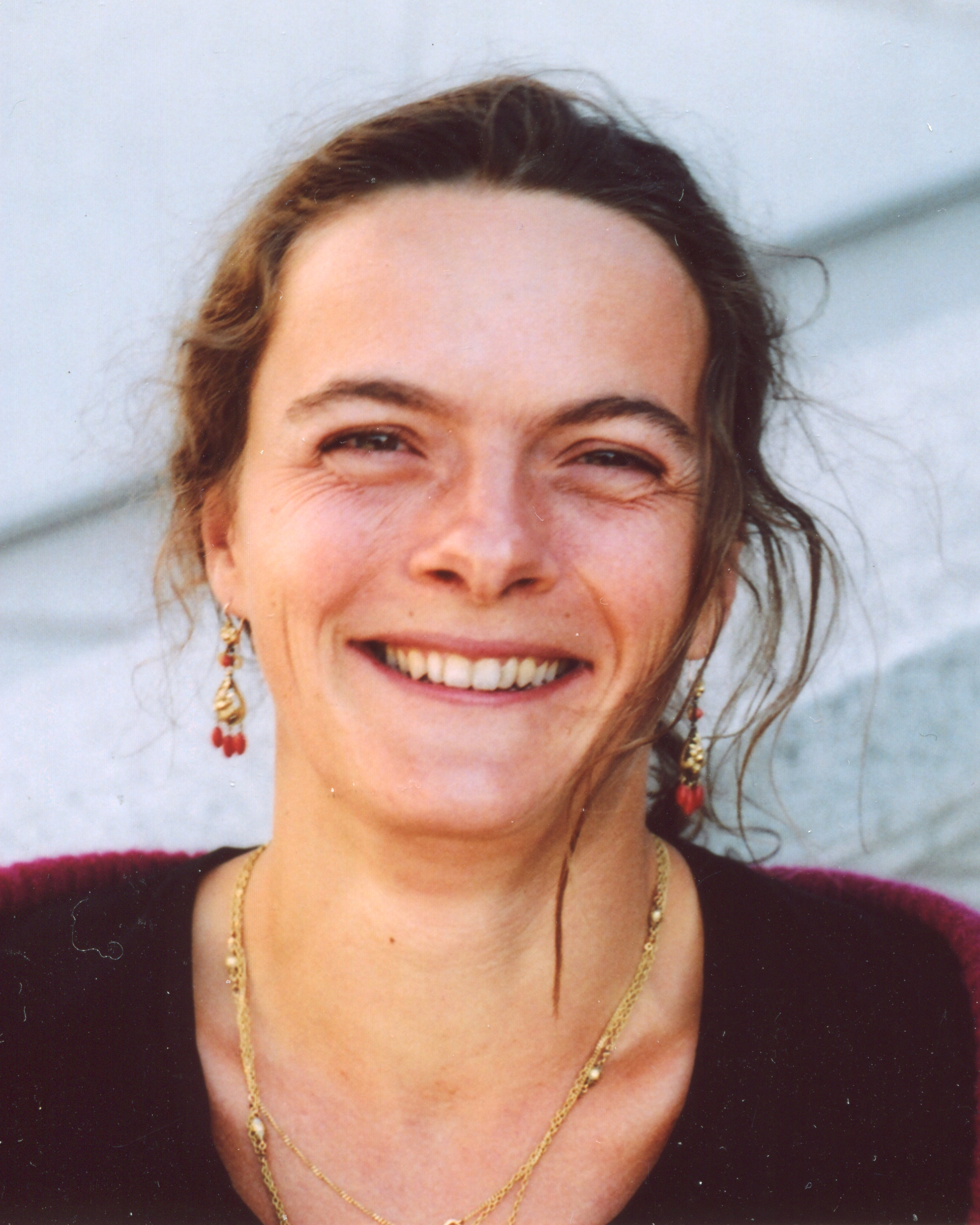
- Guionnet in 2006
- Born: 24 May 1969 (age 57)
- Education: École Normale Supérieure
- Awards: Rollo Davidson Prize (2003); Loève Prize (2009); Simons Investigator (2012)
- Scientific career
- Fields: Mathematics
- Workplaces: ENS (Lyon)
- Doctoral advisor: Gérard Ben Arous

Alice Guionnet (born 24 May 1969) is a French mathematician known for her work in probability theory, in particular on large random matrices.

== Biography ==
Guionnet entered the École Normale Supérieure (Paris) in 1989. She earned her PhD in 1995 under the supervision of Gérard Ben Arous at University of Paris-Sud. Focuses of her academic research can be viewed in her thesis, Dynamique de Langevin d'un verre de spins (Langevin Dynamics of spin glass).

She has held positions at the Courant Institute, Berkeley, MIT, and ENS (Paris). She is currently a Director of Research at ENS de Lyon.

== Works ==
Alice Guionnet is known for her work on large random matrices. In this context, she established principles of large deviations for the empirical measurements of the eigenvalues of large random matrices with Gérard Ben Arous and Ofer Zeitouni, applied the theory of concentration of measure, initiated the rigorous study of matrices with a heavy tail, and obtained the convergence of spectral measurement of non-normal matrices. She developed the analysis of Dyson-Schwinger equations to obtain topological asymptotic expansions, and studied changes in beta-models and random tilings. In collaboration with Alessio Figalli, she introduced the concept of approximate transport to demonstrate the universality of local fluctuations.

Alice Guionnet also demonstrated significant results in free probabilities by comparing Voiculescu entropies, building with Vaughan Jones and Dimitri Shlyakhtenko a round of subfactors from planar algebras of any index, and establishing isomorphisms between the algebras of von Neumann generated by q-Gaussian variables by constructing free transport.

== Distinctions ==
The Mathematical Research Institute of Oberwolfach awarded her the Oberwolfach Prize in 1998.

In 2003 she was awarded the Rollo Davidson Prize for her work in probability.

In 2006, the French Academy of Sciences awarded her the Prix Paul Doistau–Émile Blutet.

For her contributions, she won the 2009 Loève Prize.

In 2012 she became a Simons Investigator. She was elected to the French Academy of Sciences in 2017. She is also a Fellow of the Institute of Mathematical Statistics.

Guinnet is the 2018 winner of the Blaise Pascal Medal in Mathematics of the European Academy of Sciences. She became a member of the Academia Europaea in 2017.

She has been a Knight of the Legion of Honour since 2012.

In 2022 she was elected as an international member to the National Academy of Sciences (NAS) and International Honorary Member of the American Academy of Arts and Sciences (AAAS).

== Publications ==
- with Greg W. Anderson and Ofer Zeitouni, Introduction to Random Matrices, Cambridge University Press, 2009
- Large Random Matrices - Readings on Macroscopic Asymptotics, Springer, 2009 (Reading Notes in Mathematics, Summer School of Probability of Saint-Flour 2006)
- "Central limit theorem for nonlinear filtering and interacting particle systems", Annals of Applied probability 9, p. 275-297, 1999
- Dynamique de Langevin d'un verre de spins (Langevin dynamics on spin glass)
- Strong and false asymptotic freedoms of large random matrices
- Laplace, chance and its universal laws, conference of Wednesday, April 6, 2011, National Library of France
- Complex edge mechanisms for the completely asymmetric single exclusion process
- Large deviations and stochastic calculus for large random matrices, Probability Surveys vol. 1, p. 72-172, 2004
