= Gaussian free field =

Concept in statistical mechanics

In probability theory and statistical mechanics, the Gaussian free field (GFF) is a Gaussian random field, a central model of random surfaces (random height functions).

The discrete version can be defined on any graph, usually a lattice in d-dimensional Euclidean space. The continuum version is defined on R^{d} or on a bounded subdomain of R^{d}. It can be thought of as a natural generalization of one-dimensional Brownian motion to d time (but still one space) dimensions: it is a random (generalized) function from R^{d} to R. In particular, the one-dimensional continuum GFF is just the standard one-dimensional Brownian motion or Brownian bridge on an interval.

In the theory of random surfaces, it is also called the harmonic crystal. It is also the starting point for many constructions in quantum field theory, where it is called the Euclidean bosonic massless free field. A key property of the 2-dimensional GFF is conformal invariance, which relates it in several ways to the Schramm–Loewner evolution, see Sheffield (2005) and Dubédat (2009).

Similarly to Brownian motion, which is the scaling limit of a wide range of discrete random walk models (see Donsker's theorem), the continuum GFF is the scaling limit of not only the discrete GFF on lattices, but of many random height function models, such as the height function of uniform random planar domino tilings, see Kenyon (2001). The planar GFF is also the limit of the fluctuations of the characteristic polynomial of a random matrix model, the Ginibre ensemble, see Rider & Virág (2007).

The structure of the discrete GFF on any graph is closely related to the behaviour of the simple random walk on the graph. For instance, the discrete GFF plays a key role in the proof by Ding, Lee & Peres (2012) of several conjectures about the cover time of graphs (the expected number of steps it takes for the random walk to visit all the vertices).

== Definition of the discrete GFF ==
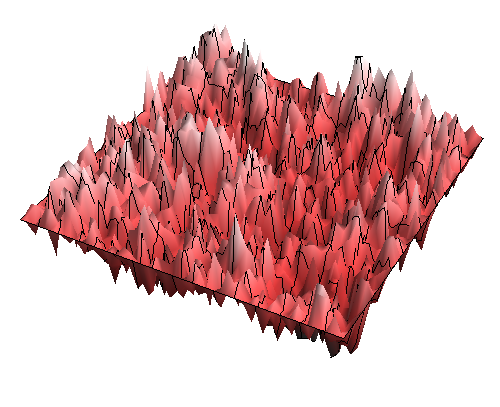
This surface plot shows a sample of the discrete Gaussian free field defined on the vertices of a 60 by 60 square grid, with zero boundary conditions. The values of the DGFF on the vertices are linearly interpolated to give a continuous function.

Let P(x, y) be the transition kernel of the Markov chain given by a random walk on a finite graph G(V, E). Let U be a fixed non-empty subset of the vertices V, and take the set of all real-valued functions $\varphi$ with some prescribed values on U. We then define a Hamiltonian by

$$H( \varphi ) = \frac{1}{2} \sum_{(x,y)} P(x,y)\big(\varphi(x) - \varphi(y)\big)^2.$$

Then, the random function with probability density proportional to $\exp(-H(\varphi))$ with respect to the Lebesgue measure on $\R^{V\setminus U}$ is called the discrete GFF with boundary U.

It is not hard to show that the expected value $\mathbb{E}[\varphi(x)]$ is the discrete harmonic extension of the boundary values from U (harmonic with respect to the transition kernel P), and the covariances $\mathrm{Cov}[\varphi(x),\varphi(y)]$ are equal to the discrete Green's function G(x, y).

So, in one sentence, the discrete GFF is the Gaussian random field on V with covariance structure given by the Green's function associated to the transition kernel P.

== The continuum field ==
The definition of the continuum field necessarily uses some abstract machinery, since it does not exist as a random height function. Instead, it is a random generalized function, or in other words, a probability distribution on distributions (with two different meanings of the word "distribution").

Given a domain Ω⊆R^{n}, consider the Dirichlet inner product

$$\langle f, g\rangle := \int_\Omega (Df(x), Dg(x)) \, dx$$

for smooth functions ƒ and g on Ω, coinciding with some prescribed boundary function on $\partial \Omega$, where $Df\,(x)$ is the gradient vector at $x\in \Omega$. Then take the Hilbert space closure with respect to this inner product, this is the Sobolev space $H^1(\Omega)$.

The continuum GFF $\varphi$ on $\Omega$ is a Gaussian random field indexed by $H^1(\Omega)$, i.e., a collection of Gaussian random variables, one for each $f \in H^1(\Omega)$, denoted by $\langle \varphi,f \rangle$, such that the covariance structure is $\mathrm{Cov}[\langle \varphi,f \rangle, \langle \varphi,g \rangle] = \langle f,g \rangle$ for all $f,g\in H^1(\Omega)$.

Such a random field indeed exists, and its distribution is unique. Given any orthonormal basis $\psi_1, \psi_2, \dots$ of $H^1(\Omega)$ (with the given boundary condition), we can form the formal infinite sum

$$\varphi := \sum_{k=1}^\infty \xi_k \psi_k,$$

where the $\xi_k$ are i.i.d. standard normal variables. This random sum almost surely will not exist as an element of $H^1(\Omega)$, since if it did then

$$\langle \varphi,\varphi \rangle = \sum_{k=1}^\infty \xi_k^2=\infty\quad \textrm{a.s.}$$

However, it exists as a random generalized function, since for any $f \in H^1(\Omega)$ we have

$$f=\sum_{k=1}^\infty c_k \psi_k,\text{ with }\sum_{k=1}^\infty c_k^2 < \infty,$$

hence

$$\langle \varphi,f \rangle := \sum_{k=1}^\infty \xi_k c_k$$

is a centered Gaussian random variable with finite variance $\sum_k c_k^2.$

=== Special case: n = 1 ===
Although the above argument shows that $\varphi$ does not exist as a random element of $H^1(\Omega)$, it still could be that it is a random function on $\Omega$ in some larger function space. In fact, in dimension $n=1$, an orthonormal basis of $H^1[0,1]$ is given by

$\psi_k (t):= \int_0^t \varphi_k(s) \, ds\,,$ where $(\varphi_k)$ form an orthonormal basis of $L^2[0,1]\,,$

and then $\varphi(t):=\sum_{k=1}^\infty \xi_k \psi_k(t)$ is easily seen to be a one-dimensional Brownian motion (or Brownian bridge, if the boundary values for $\varphi_k$ are set up that way). So, in this case, it is a random continuous function (not belonging to $H^1[0,1]$, however). For instance, if $(\varphi_k)$ is the Haar basis, then this is Lévy's construction of Brownian motion, see, e.g., Section 3 of Peres (2001).

On the other hand, for $n \geq 2$ it can indeed be shown to exist only as a generalized function, see Sheffield (2007).

=== Special case: n = 2 ===
In dimension n = 2, the conformal invariance of the continuum GFF is clear from the invariance of the Dirichlet inner product. The corresponding two-dimensional conformal field theory describes a massless free scalar boson.

== See also ==
- Brownian sheet
