= Amir Dembo =

Israeli-American mathematician

- אמיר דמבו
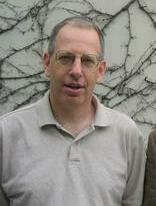
- Born: October 25, 1958 (age 68); Haifa, Israel
- Education: Technion – Israel Institute of Technology
- Known for: Probability theory, Stochastic processes, Theory of large deviations
- Scientific career
- Fields: Mathematics, Probability theory
- Workplaces: Stanford University
- Doctoral advisor: David Malah

Amir Dembo (Hebrew: אמיר דמבו; born October 25, 1958, Haifa) is an Israeli-American mathematician, specializing in probability theory. He was elected a member of the National Academy of Sciences in 2022, and of the American Academy of Arts and Sciences in 2023.

== Biography ==
Dembo received his bachelor's degree in electrical engineering in 1980 from the Technion. He obtained in 1986 his doctorate in electrical engineering under the supervision of David Malah with the thesis "Design of Digital FIR Filter Arrays". He joined Stanford University as Assistant Professor of Statistics and Mathematics in 1990, and is currently the Marjorie Mhoon Fair Professor in Quantitative Science there.

His research deals with probability theory and stochastic processes, the theory of large deviations, the spectral theory of random matrices, random walks, and interacting particle systems.

He was Invited Speaker with the talk Simple random covering, disconnection, late and favorite points at the ICM in Madrid in 2006. Dembo is a fellow of the Institute of Mathematical Statistics.

His doctoral students include Scott Sheffield and Jason P. Miller.

== Selected publications ==
=== Articles ===
- Dembo, Amir; Peres, Yuval; Rosen, Jay; Zeitouni, Ofer (2001). "Thick points for planar Brownian motion and the Erdős-Taylor conjecture on random walk". Acta Mathematica. 186 (2): 239–270. doi:10.1007/BF02401841.
- Dembo, Amir; Poonen, Bjorn; Shao, Qi-Man; Zeitouni, Ofer (2002). "Random polynomials having few or no real zeros". J. Amer. Math. Soc. 15 (4): 857–892. arXiv:math/0006113. doi:10.1090/S0894-0347-02-00386-7.
- with Yuval Peres, Jay Rosen and Ofer Zeitouni: Dembo, Amir; Peres, Yuval; Rosen, Jay; Zeitouni, Ofer (2002). "Thick points for intersections of planar sample paths". Trans. Amer. Math. Soc. 354 (12): 4969–5003. arXiv:math/0105107. doi:10.1090/S0002-9947-02-03080-5.

=== Books ===
- Large Deviations Techniques and Applications, Springer, Dembo, Amir; Zeitouni, Ofer (2009). 2nd edition, corrected printing of 1998 edition. ISBN 9783642033117.

== Sources ==
- Zhan Shi: Problèmes de recouvrement et points exceptionnels pour la marche aléatoire et le mouvement brownien, d'après Dembo, Peres, Rosen, Zeitouni, Seminaire Bourbaki, No. 951, 2005
