= Ofer Zeitouni =

Israeli mathematician

- עפר זיתוני
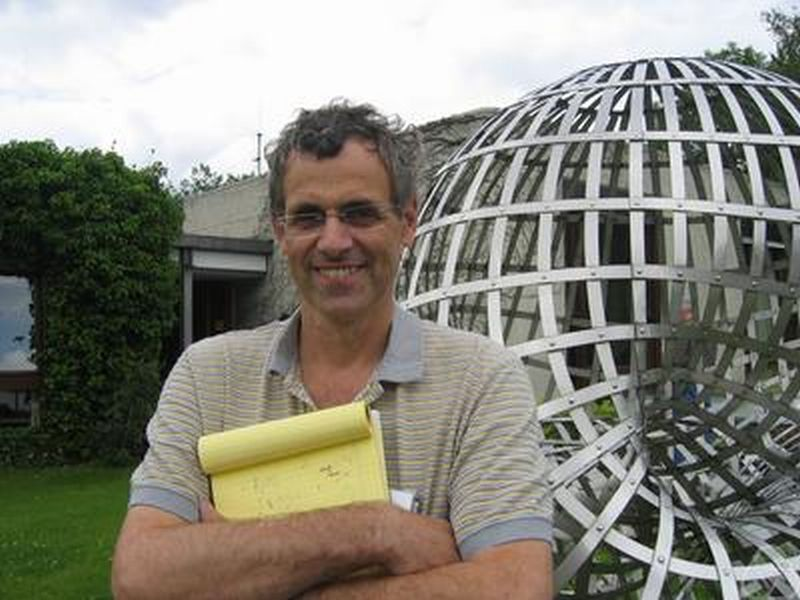
- Zeitouni in 2008
- Born: October 23, 1960 (age 66); Haifa, Israel
- Education: Technion – Israel Institute of Technology
- Known for: Stochastic processes, filtering theory, spectral theory of random matrices, large deviations theory, motion in random media, extremes of logarithmically correlated fields
- Awards: Fellow of the American Mathematical Society, Member of the American Academy of Arts and Sciences, Member of the National Academy of Sciences, Member of the Israel Academy of Sciences and Humanities
- Scientific career
- Fields: Probability theory
- Workplaces: Weizmann Institute of Science, Courant Institute of Mathematical Sciences, University of Minnesota, Technion – Israel Institute of Technology
- Doctoral advisor: Moshe Zakai

Ofer Zeitouni (Hebrew: עפר זיתוני; born 23 October 1960, Haifa) is an Israeli mathematician, specializing in probability theory.

== Biography ==
Zeitouni received his bachelor's degree in electrical engineering in 1980 from the Technion.

He obtained in 1986 his doctorate in electrical engineering under the supervision of Moshe Zakai with the thesis Bounds on the Conditional Density and Maximum a posteriori Estimators for the Nonlinear Filtering Problem. As a postdoc he was a visiting assistant professor at Brown University and at the Laboratory for Information and Decision Systems at MIT. He joined the Technion in 1989 as senior lecturer, and was promoted in 1991 to associate professor, and in 1997 to full professor in the department of electrical engineering. He is now a professor of Mathematics at the Weizmann Institute and at the Courant Institute, and was from 2002 to 2013 a part-time professor at the University of Minnesota.

His research deals with stochastic processes and filtering theory with applications to control theory (electrical engineering), the spectral theory of random matrices, the theory of large deviations in probability theory, motion in random media, and extremes of logarithmically correlated fields.

He was Invited Speaker with the talk Random Walks in Random Environments at the ICM in Beijing in 2002. Zeitouni is a Fellow of the American Mathematical Society, member of the American Academy of Arts and Sciences, the National Academy of Sciences, and the Israel Academy of Sciences and Humanities.

He is married and has two children.

== Selected publications ==
=== Articles ===
- with Ildar Abdulovich Ibragimov: Ibragimov, Ildar; Zeitouni, Ofer (1997). "On roots of random polynomials". Trans. Amer. Math. Soc. 349 (6): 2427–2441. doi:10.1090/S0002-9947-97-01766-2.
- with Amir Dembo, Yuval Peres, and Jay Rosen: Dembo, Amir; Peres, Yuval; Rosen, Jay; Zeitouni, Ofer (2001). "Thick points for planar Brownian motion and the Erdős-Taylor conjecture on random walk". Acta Mathematica. 186 (2): 239–270. doi:10.1007/BF02401841.
- with Amir Dembo, Bjorn Poonen, and Qi-Man Shao: Dembo, Amir; Poonen, Bjorn; Shao, Qi-Man; Zeitouni, Ofer (2002). "Random polynomials having few or no real zeros". J. Amer. Math. Soc. 15 (4): 857–892. arXiv:math/0006113. doi:10.1090/S0894-0347-02-00386-7.
- with Amir Dembo, Yuval Peres, and Jay Rosen: Dembo, Amir; Peres, Yuval; Rosen, Jay; Zeitouni, Ofer (2002). "Thick points for intersections of planar sample paths". Trans. Amer. Math. Soc. 354 (12): 4969–5003. arXiv:math/0105107. doi:10.1090/S0002-9947-02-03080-5.
- Zeitouni, Ofer (2004). "Part II: Random walks in random environment". In: Lectures on probability theory and statistics. Lecture Notes in Mathematics. Vol. 1837. Berlin, Heidelberg: Springer. pp. 190–312. doi:10.1007/978-3-540-39874-5_2. ISBN 978-3-540-20832-7.

=== Books ===
- with Greg W. Anderson and Alice Guionnet: Introduction to Random Matrices, Cambridge University Press 2010
- with Amir Dembo: Large Deviations Techniques and Applications, Springer 1998, Dembo, Amir; Zeitouni, Ofer (2009). 2nd edition, corrected printing of 1998 edition. Springer. ISBN 9783642033117; pbk

== Sources ==
- Zhan Shi: Problèmes de recouvrement et points exceptionnels pour la marche aléatoire et le mouvement brownien, d’après Dembo, Peres, Rosen, Zeitouni, Seminaire Bourbaki, No. 951, 2005
