= List of probability journals =

This is a list of peer-reviewed scientific journals published in the field of probability.

- Advances in Applied Probability
- ALEA - Latin American Journal of Probability and Mathematical Statistics
- Annales de l’Institut Henri Poincaré
- Annals of Applied Probability
- Annals of Probability
- Bernoulli
- Brazilian Journal of Probability and Statistics
- Combinatorics, Probability and Computing
- Communications on Stochastic Analysis
- Electronic Communications in Probability
- Electronic Journal of Probability
- ESAIM: Probability and Statistics
- Finance and Stochastics
- Journal of Applied Probability
- Journal of Theoretical Probability
- Markov Processes and Related Fields
- Methodology and Computing in Applied Probability
- Modern Stochastics: Theory and Applications
- Probability and Mathematical Statistics
- Probability in the Engineering and Informational Sciences
- Probability Surveys
- Probability Theory and Related Fields
- Queueing Systems
- Random Matrices: Theory and Applications
- Random Operators and Stochastic Equations
- Random Structures & Algorithms
- Stochastics: An International Journal of Probability and Stochastic Processes
- Statistics & Probability Letters
- Stochastic Analysis and Applications
- Stochastics and Dynamics
- Stochastic Models
- Stochastic Processes and their Applications
- Stochastic Systems
- Theory of Probability and Its Applications
- Theory of Probability and Mathematical Statistics
- Theory of Stochastic Processes

== See also ==
- List of scientific journals
- List of statistics journals
- List of mathematics journals
