= Olav Kallenberg =

Swedish American mathematician

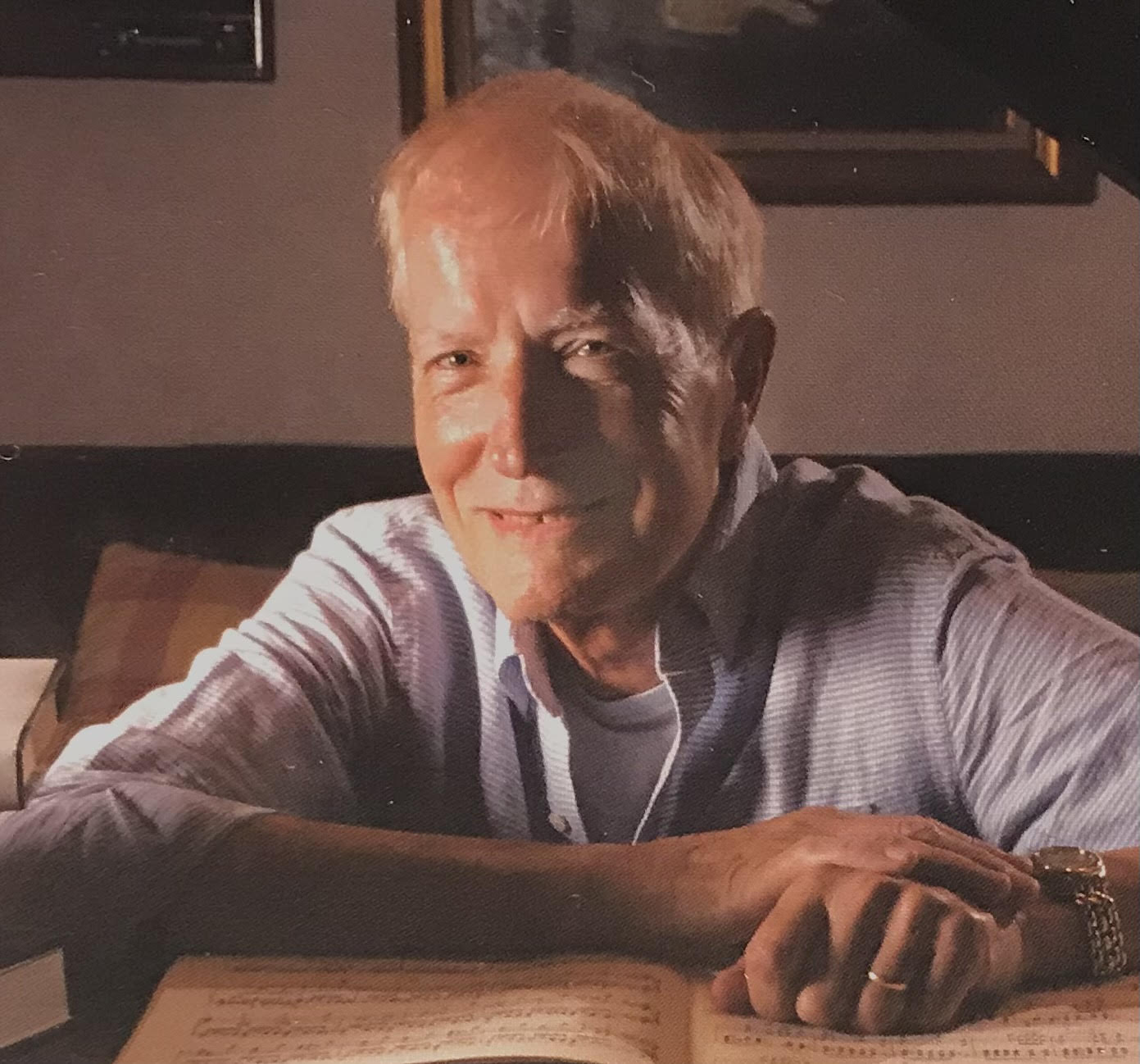
- Born: 1939; Gothenburg
- Citizenship: Swedish and American
- Education: Royal Institute of Technology; Chalmers University of Technology (PhD)
- Known for: Random measures; Probabilistic symmetries; Foundations of modern probability
- Awards: Rollo Davidson Prize
- Scientific career
- Fields: Probability Theory
- Workplaces: Chalmers University; Auburn University
- Doctoral advisor: Peter Jagers
- Other academic advisors: Carl-Gustav Esseen

Olav Kallenberg (born September 22, 1939) is a Swedish-American mathematician, working in all areas of probability theory. He is especially known for his work on random measures and probabilistic symmetries, and for his graduate-level textbooks and monographs. Since 2018 he is an Emeritus Professor of Mathematics at Auburn University, AL.

== Biography ==
Kallenberg was born in Gothenburg, Sweden, but grew up in Stockholm, where he attended the KTH (Royal Institute of Technology), division of Technical Physics, graduating with honors as a civil engineer. In 1966 he got a masters degree (then about equivalent to a present Ph.D.) in probability theory (belonging to the division of Mathematical Statistics at KTH) under the direction of Carl-Gustav Esseen. After a few years as a full-time university lecturer and industry consultant, he joined the Mathematics Department at Chalmers University of Technology, in Gothenburg, where he got his Ph.D. in 1972 on a thesis on Random Measures, under the direction of Peter Jagers and inspired by his work. (For administrative purposes only, Kallenberg appears to have been under Harald Bergström.) An extended version of the thesis was later published by Akademie-Verlag and Academic Press, and appeared in four editions, 1975-86. After graduation, Kallenberg stayed at Chalmers University on various post-doctoral positions, apart from year-long visits to Chapel Hill 1973–74 and Vancouver 1978–79. In 1985 he was appointed as Professor at Uppsala University, succeeding Esseen, which caused him automatically to lose his position in Gothenburg. However, due to a crisis in the Swedish house market, he couldn't afford his move to Uppsala, which is why he chose instead to move to the United States. In 1986 he was appointed as a tenured Professor of Mathematics at Auburn University. In 2018 he retired as an Emeritus Professor of Mathematics, to focus on his research, professional writing, and international travel.

== Honors and awards ==
In 1958, Kallenberg was the national winner of a yearly mathematics competition for high-school students.

In 1977 he was the second recipient of the Rollo Davidson Prize from Cambridge University, for his solution of a famous problem in stochastic geometry.

In 1986 he gave a one-hour plenary talk at the 2nd World Congress of Mathematical Statistics and Probability in Tashkent (then belonging to the Soviet Union but now the capital of independent Uzbekistan.)

In 1989 he was elected a Fellow of the Institute of Mathematical Statistics.

In 1993 he was a one-hour plenary speaker at the yearly American Mathematical Society Conference, held in Knoxville, TN.

In 2005 he gave a one-hour plenary talk at the 1st Franco-Nordic Congress of Mathematicians in Reykjavik, Iceland.

In 2006 he was selected as the Distinguished Graduate Faculty Lecturer at Auburn University.

In 2006 and 2018 he gave the opening plenary talks at the international Vilnius and SPA (Stochastic Processes and their Applications) Conferences.

In 2013 he was honored by an international Olav Kallenberg Workshop at the Mittag-Leffler Institute in Djursholm, Sweden, attended by leading probabilists from eight different countries.

== Professional Service ==
Editor-in-Chief of the journal PTRF (Probability Theory and Related Fields), 1991-94.

Associate Editor for Zeitschrift für Wahrscheinlichkeitstheorie and verwandte Gebiete (predecessor to PTRF), Stochastic Processes and Applications, and Probability Surveys (over periods of time for each of them).

== Selected publications ==
=== Books ===
- Random Measures, editions 1-2 (104 pp.) MR 0431372, 1975-76; editions 3-4 (187 pp.) Academic Press, New York, London; Akademie-Verlag, Berlin, 1983-86. MR 0818219 ISBN 0-12-394960-2
- Probabilistic Symmetries and Invariance Principles (510 pp.) Springer -Verlag, New York, 2005. ISBN 0-387-25115-4; MR 2161313
- Random Measures, Theory and Applications (694 pp.), 2017. ISBN 978-3-319-41598-7; MR 3642325
- Foundations of Modern Probability, 1st edition (523 pp.) 1997 ISBN 0-387-94957-7; MR 1464694; 2nd edition (638 pp.) Springer Series in Statistics 2002 ISBN 0-387-95313-2; MR 1876169; 3d edition (946 pp.) Probability Theory and Stochastic Modelling 2021. ISBN 978-3-030-61871-1; MR 4226142
- The Discovery of Modern Probability, 1920-1980 (approx. 500 pp.), in preparation.

=== Scientific papers ===
- Homogeneity and the strong Markov property. Ann. Probab. 15 (1987), 213–240.
- Spreading and predictable sampling in exchangeable sequences and processes. Ann. Probab. 16 (1988), 508–534.
- Multiple integration with respect to Poisson and Lévy processes (with J. Szulga). Probab. Th. Rel. Fields (1989), 101–134.
- General Wald-type identities for exchangeable sequences and processes. Probab. Th. Rel. Fields 83 (1989), 447–487.
- Random time change and an integral representation for marked stopping times. Probab. Th. Rel. Fields 86 (1990), 167–202.
- Some dimension-free features of vector-valued martingales (with R. Sztencel). Probab. Th. Rel. Fields 88 (1991), 215–247.
- Symmetries on random arrays and set-indexed processes. J. Theor. Probab. 5 (1992), 727–765.
- Random arrays and functionals with multivariate rotational symmetries. Probab. Th. Rel. Fields 103 (1995), 91–141.
- On the existence of universal functional solutions to classical SDEs. Ann. Probab. 24 (1996), 196–205.
