= Victor Panaretos =

Greek mathematical statistician

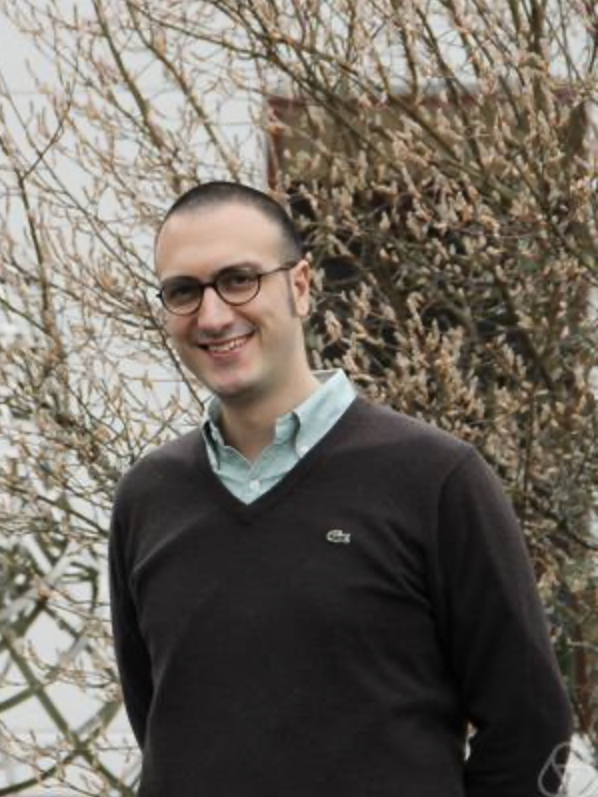
- Born: Victor Michael Panaretos; 1982 (age 43–44)
- Education: University of California, Berkeley (PhD)
- Scientific career
- Fields: Statistics
- Workplaces: École Polytechnique Fédérale de Lausanne
- Thesis: Inverse Problems, Stochastic Geometry, Structural Biology (2007)
- Doctoral advisor: David R. Brillinger
- Website: smat-files.epfl.ch/victor/

Victor Michael Panaretos (born 1982) is a Greek mathematical statistician. He is currently Professor and Director at the Institute of Mathematics of the École Polytechnique Fédérale de Lausanne (EPFL), where he holds the chair of Mathematical Statistics.

Panaretos works at the interface of nonparametric statistics, random processes, and stochastic geometry. He is known for contributions to the functional data analysis of random functions, operators, and measures. He has published widely in statistical theory and methods as well as in applied probability, and is the author of two books.

== Education ==
Panaretos received his PhD from the University of California, Berkeley in 2007, advised by David R. Brillinger. His doctoral thesis was awarded the Erich Lehmann award.

== Career and research ==
After graduation Panaretos took up a faculty position at École Polytechnique Fédérale de Lausanne (EPFL), becoming the youngest person ever to be appointed to a chair at the institution. He is an elected member of the International Statistical Institute and a Fellow of the Institute of Mathematical Statistics. He was a recipient of a European Research Council (ERC) Starting Grant Award in 2010, and the 2019 Bernoulli Society Forum Lecturer.

An active member of the Bernoulli Society and its parent organization, the International Statistical Institute, Panaretos has served the probability and statistics community from several posts, notably as the editor of Bernoulli News, a member of the ISI Council, and as President-Elect of the Bernoulli Society.

Panaretos has served on the editorial boards of the Annals of Statistics, the Annals of Applied Statistics, Biometrika, the Electronic Journal of Statistics, and the Journal of the American Statistical Association.
