= Eugene A. Feinberg =

American applied mathematician

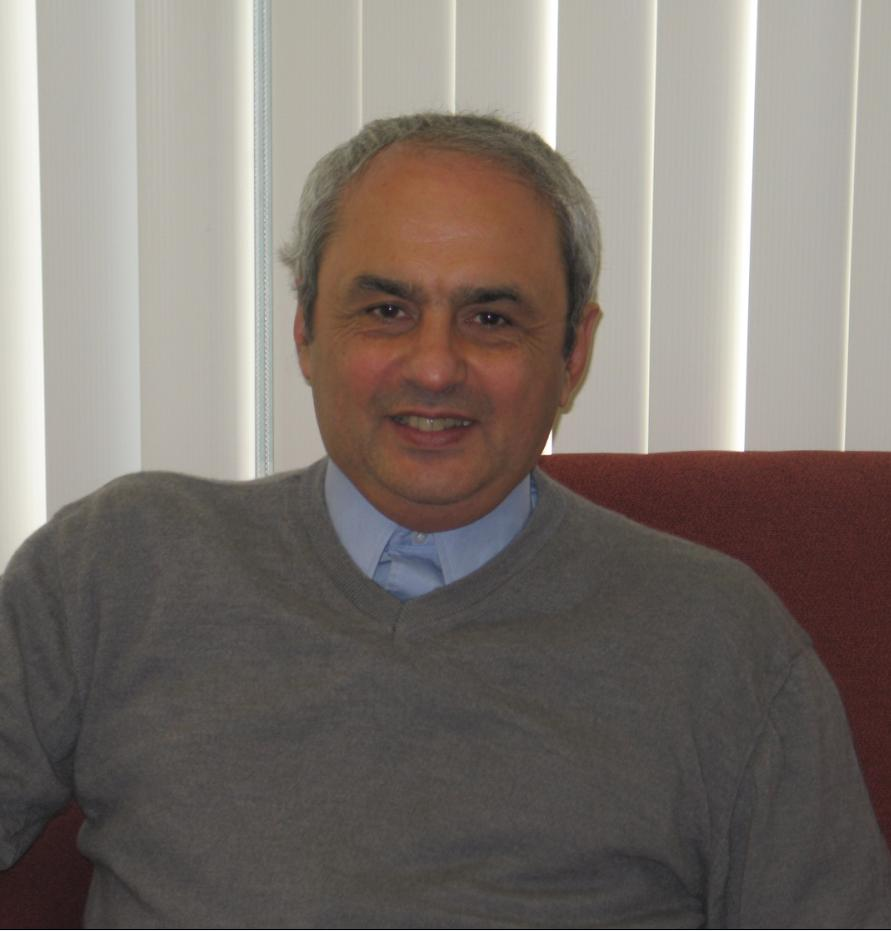
- Feinberg in 2002
- Born: 1954 (age 71–72); Moscow, Russia
- Education: Vilnius University
- Known for: Markov Decision Processes, Stochastic Models
- Awards: IEEE Charles Hirsh Award (2012), IBM Faculty Award (2012)
- Scientific career
- Fields: Operations Research
- Thesis: (1979)
- Doctoral advisor: Alexander Yushkevich

Eugene A. Feinberg is an American mathematician and distinguished professor of applied mathematics and statistics at Stony Brook University. He is noted for his work in probability theory, real analysis, and Markov decision processes.

== Biography ==
Feinberg was born in Moscow, Russia in 1954. He received his masters degree in applied mathematics from the Russian University of Transport (MIIT). He completed his PhD thesis at Vilnius University in 1979 under Alexander Yushkevich and held research and faculty positions at the from 1976 to 1988. Feinberg immigrated to the United States in 1988, working as a visiting faculty member of Yale University's operations research group. In 1989, he joined Stony Brook University's faculty in the Applied Mathematics and Statistics department.

== Research ==
Feinberg's research interests include applied probability and its applications to operations research, Markov decision processes, and industrial applications of operations research. His work includes the theory of MDPs and solutions to Kolmogorov's forward equations for jump Markov processes. He also contributed to real analysis by developing generalizations of Fatou's lemma and Berge's maximum theorem. Feinberg has also worked on applications including electric grid forecasting.

== Selected writings ==
- Handbook of Markov Decision Processes: Methods and Algorithms (with A. Shwartz, editors), Kluwer, Boston, 2002.
- "Load Forecasting," (with D. Genethliou), Applied Mathematics for Restructured Electric Power Systems: Optimization, Control, and Computational Intelligence (J. H. Chow, F.F. Wu, and J.J. Momoh, eds.), Springer, pp. 269–285, 2005.
- "Continuous Time Discounted Jump Markov Decision Processes: A Discrete-Event Approach,” Mathematics of Operations Research, 29, pp. 492–524, 2004.
- "Constrained Discounted Dynamic Programming" (with A. Shwartz), Mathematics of Operations Research, 21, pp. 922–945, 1996.
- "Constrained Semi-Markov Decision Processes with Average Rewards," ZOR - Mathematical Methods of Operations Research, 39, pp. 257–288, 1994.
- "Average-Cost Markov Decision Processes with Weakly Continuous Transition Probabilities," (with P.O. Kasyanov and N.V. Zadoianchuk), Mathematics of Operations Research 37, pp. 591–607, 2012.
- "Constrained Discounted Markov Decision Processes and Hamiltonian Cycles" Mathematics of Operations Research, 25, pp. 130–140, 2000.
- "Quickest Detection of Drift Change for Brownian Motion in Generalized Bayesian and Minimax Settings," (with A.N. Shiryaev), Statistics & Decisions, 24, 445-470, 2006.
- "Constrained Markov Decision Models with Weighted Discounting" (with A. Shwartz), Mathematics of Operations Research, 20, pp. 302–320, 1995.
- "Controlled Markov Processes with Arbitrary Numerical Criteria," SIAM Theory Probability Appl., 27, pp. 486–503, 1982.
- "Markov Decision Models with Weighted Discounted Criteria" (with A. Shwartz), Mathematics of Operations Research, 19, pp. 152–168, 1994.
- "Partially Observable Total-Cost Markov Decision Processes with Weakly Continuous Transition Probabilities," (with P.O. Kasyanov and M.Z. Zgurovsky), Mathematics of Operations Research, 41, pp. 656–681, 2016.
- "Fatou’s Lemma for Weakly Converging Probabilities," (with P.O. Kasyanov, N.V. Zadoianchuk) Theory Probab. Appl., 58, pp. 683–689, 2014.

== Awards and honors ==
Feinberg was awarded an honorary Doctorate from the Institute of Applied System Analysis at the National Technical University of Ukraine.

Feinberg is a member of the INFORMS Fellows class of 2011, elected "for his fundamental contributions to the theory and practice of operations research in the areas of Markov decision processes and dynamic programming."

He was among the recipients of the 2012 IBM Faculty Award.

Feineberg received the IEEE Charles Hirsch Award in 2012 for "developing and implementing on Long Island, electric load forecasting methods and smart grid technologies."

He is a member of the editorial boards of Mathematics of Operations Research, Operations Research Letters, Stochastic Models, and Applied Mathematics Letters.
