= Katherine J. Thompson =

American statistician

Katherine Jenny Thompson is a statistician in the United States Census Bureau, where she is Methodology Director of Complex Survey Methods and Analysis Group in the Economic Statistical Methods Division.

In this role, part of her responsibility is helping find methods for determining and modeling economic data where it may not have been provided by businesses completing the census. Her method for assessing this "nonresponse" data was published in The Annals of Applied Statistics.^{[AT]} More recently, she has been exploring hot deck imputation as a method for predicting the missing data.^{[ABT]}

Thompson began her undergraduate studies as an English major, but switched to mathematics after finding her courses in that subject more interesting. She joined the Census Bureau directly from college, and later earned a graduate degree in applied statistics through part-time study.

Thompson has been a frequent lecturer and organizer of special sessions at the Joint Statistics Meetings, one of the largest meetings of statisticians in the world.

Thompson was elected as a Fellow of the American Statistical Association in 2017. During 2020, she served as president of the American Statistical Association's Section on Government Statistics. She is editor for the scholarly journal Journal of Survey Statistics and Methodology (JSSAM).

== Selected publications ==
AT.	Andridge, Rebecca; Thompson, Katherine Jenny (December 2015), "Assessing nonresponse bias in a business survey: Proxy pattern-mixture analysis for skewed data", The Annals of Applied Statistics, 9 (4): 2237–2265, doi:10.1214/15-aoas878

ABT.	Andridge, Rebecca; Bechtel, Laura; Thompson, Katherine Jenny (April 2020), "Finding a flexible hot-deck imputation method for multinomial data", Journal of Survey Statistics and Methodology, 9 (4) smaa005, doi:10.1093/jssam/smaa005
