= Peter Jagers =

Swedish mathematician and statistician (born 1941)

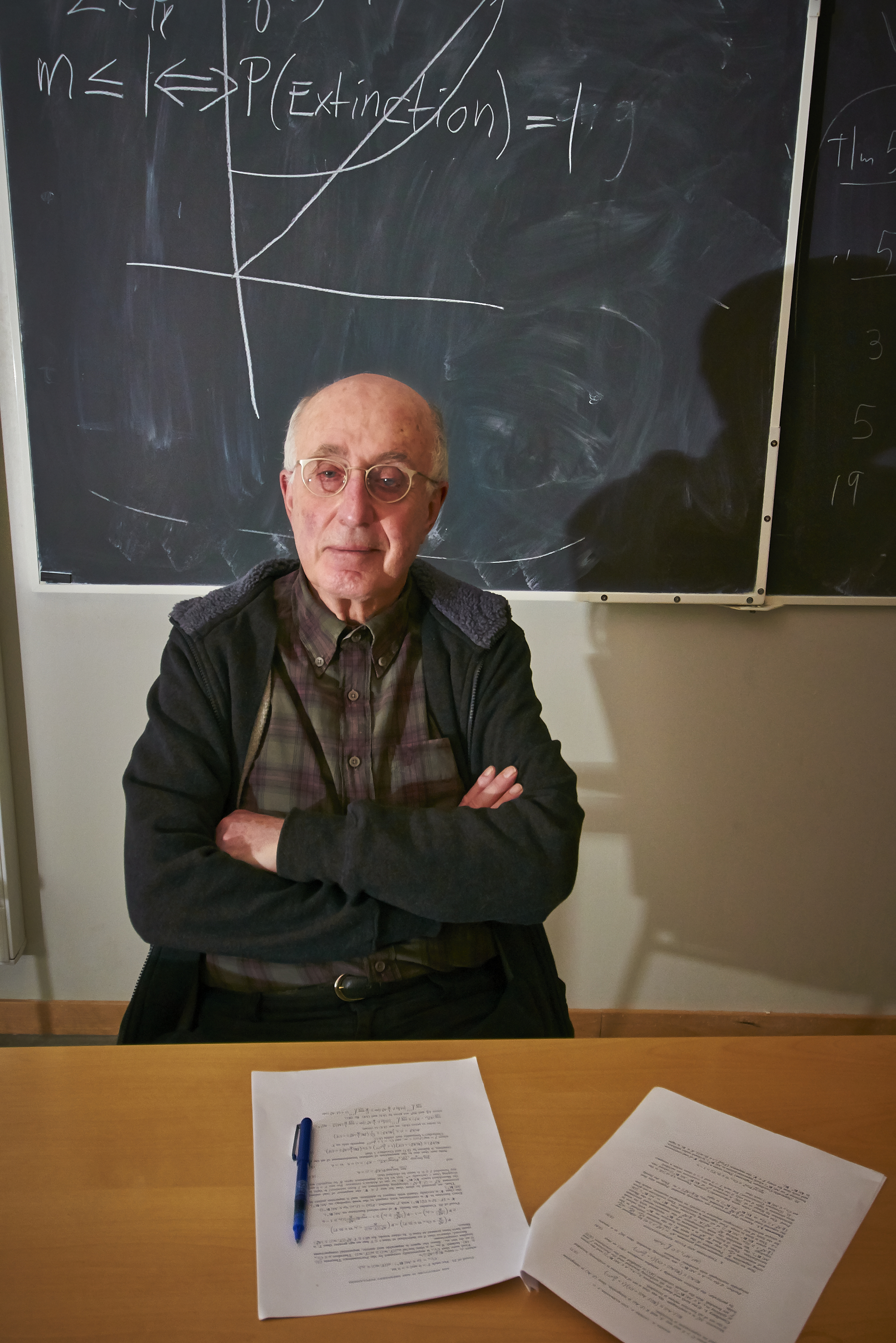
- Born: March 1941 (age 85); Gothenburg, Sweden
- Known for: Branching process

Academic background
- Education: University of Gothenburg (PhD)
- Thesis: Five contributions to the mathematical study of populations (1968)
- Doctoral advisor: Harald Bergström

Academic work
- Institutions: Chalmers University of Technology; University of Gothenburg

Peter Jagers (12 March 1941) is a professor emeritus of mathematical statistics at University of Gothenburg and Chalmers University of Technology who made lasting contributions in probability and general branching processes. Jagers was first vice president (2007–2010) of the Royal Swedish Academy of Sciences and chair of the Royal Society of Arts and Sciences in Gothenburg (2012). He in an elected member of the International Statistical Institute, a Fellow of the Institute of Mathematical Statistics and past president of the Bernoulli Society (2005–2007). He also served as a member of the Scientific Advisory Board of Statistics Sweden.

Jagers has been coordinating editor of the Journal of Applied Probability and Advances in Applied Probability. He is on the editorial committee for Springer's books on probability theory and was editor of Stochastic Processes and their Applications 1989–1993.

== Honors and awards ==
Jagers received an honorary doctorate from the Bulgarian Academy of Sciences and in 2012 was awarded the Carver Medal by the Institute of Mathematical Statistics. In 2003 he received the Chalmers Medal and in 2005 was awarded King Carl XVI Gustaf 's gold medal for "services to mathematics in Sweden and internationally".

== Publications ==
He has published a large number of scientific works, notably in branching process theory and its applications, and is the author of two books, Branching Processes with Biological Applications (J. Wiley 1975) and Branching Processes: Variation, Growth, and Extinction of Populations (Cambridge U. Press 2005). The Crump-Mode-Jagers (or generalized) branching process is named for Jagers.
