= Peter Guttorp =

Statistician

Peter Guttorp is a statistician, born in Sweden, with most of his career in the United States. He is a professor emeritus at the University of Washington and professor at the Norwegian Computing Center. Most of his work is in stochastic modeling of scientific data in hematology, geosciences, and climatology, with particular focus on spatial and spatio-temporal approaches. He has also worked in the history of statistics.

Guttorp received a journalist exam from the Stockholm School of Journalism in 1969, and a PhD in Statistics from the University of California at Berkeley in 1980. He was awarded an honorary doctorate from Lund University in 2009.

Guttorp is a fellow of the American Statistical Association, and the Institute of Mathematical Statistics. He is an elected member of the International Statistical Institute and served on its executive committee as vice president from 2017 to 2021. He was president of the International Environmetric Society from 2002 to 2004.

== Bibliography ==
- P. Guttorp and T. Löfström (1978): President de Huslund (in Swedish). Lund: Cavefors.
- P. Guttorp (1991): Statistical inference for branching processes. New York: Wiley.
- A. T. Walden and P. Guttorp, eds. (1992): Statistics in the Environmental and Earth Sciences. London: Edward Arnold
- P. Guttorp (1995): Stochastic modeling of scientific data. London: Chapman & Hall.
- A. Gelfand, P. Diggle, M. Fuentes and P. Guttorp (2010): Handbook in Spatial Statistics. Boca Raton: Chapman & Hall.
- P. Guttorp and D. R. Brillinger (2011): Selected works of David Brillinger. New York: Springer.
