= Robotti =

Robotti is an Italian surname. Notable people with the surname include:

- Aurelio Robotti (1913–1994), Italian engineer and professor
  - 9796 Robotti, a minor planet named after Aurelio Robotti
- Enzo Robotti (born 1935), former Italian footballer
- Mario Robotti (1882–1955), Italian general in the Royal Italian Army
- Nadia Robotti, Italian historian of physics
