= Patricia Gonçalves =

Patricia Gonçalves may refer to:

- Patricia Gonçalves (mathematician), Portuguese mathematician
- Patricia Gonçalves (politician) (born 1971), Portuguese politician
