= Bálint Tóth =

Hungarian mathematician

Bálint Tóth (born 1955, Cluj/Kolozsvár/Klausenburg) is a Hungarian mathematician whose work concerns probability theory, stochastic process and probabilistic aspects of mathematical physics. He obtained PhD in 1988 from the Hungarian Academy of Sciences, worked as senior researcher at the Institute of Mathematics of the HAS and as professor of mathematics at TU Budapest. He holds the Chair of Probability at the University of Bristol and is a research professor at the Alfréd Rényi Institute of Mathematics, Budapest.

He has worked on microscopic models of Brownian motion, quantum spin systems, limit theorems for random walks with long memory, and non-conventional stochastic processes, hydrodynamic limits, etc. In particular, Tóth contributed to the theory of self-interacting motions, that is, motions that are "reinforced", "self-avoiding" or "self-repellent". In collaboration with Wendelin Werner he constructed the random geometric object later called the Brownian web.

Tóth was an invited speaker of the International Congress of Mathematicians ICM-2018 (Rio de Janeiro), and of the European Congress of Mathematics ECM-2000 (Barcelona). He was plenary speaker at three Conferences on Stochastic Processes and their Applications SPA-2005 (Santa Barbara), SPA-2014 (Buenos Aires), and IMS Medallion Lecturer at SPA-2022 (Wuhan).

He is a member of Academia Europaea and a corresponding member of the Hungarian Academy of Sciences.

Tóth was Editor-in-Chief of the journals Electronic Journal of Probability (2009-2011) and Annals of Applied Probability (2016-2018). Currently he is co-Editor-in-Chief (jointly with Fabio Toninelli) of Probability Theory and Related Fields.
