= David R. Brillinger =

American statistician

David Brillinger FRSC
- Born: David Ross Brillinger; October 27, 1937 (age 89); Toronto, Ontario
- Education: University of Toronto (BA); Princeton University (MA, PhD)
- Awards: COPSS Distinguished Achievement Award and Lectureship (1991)
- Scientific career
- Fields: Statistics; Time series
- Workplaces: University of California, Berkeley; London School of Economics; Bell labs
- Thesis: Asymptotic Means and Variances in the K-Dimensional Case (1961)
- Doctoral advisor: John Tukey
- Doctoral students: Peter Guttorp; Ross Ihaka; Rafael Irizarry; Victor Panaretos
- Website: www.stat.berkeley.edu/~brill/

David Ross Brillinger (born 1937) FRSC is a statistician and Emeritus Professor of Statistics at the University of California, Berkeley. He received his PhD from Princeton in 1961 under John Tukey. Brillinger's former doctoral students include Peter Guttorp, Ross Ihaka, Rafael Irizarry and Victor Panaretos.
