= Teugels =

Teugels is a surname. Notable people with the surname include:

- Jacques Teugels (1946–2024), Belgian footballer
- Jozef Teugels (born 1939), Belgian mathematical statistician and actuary
- Lennert Teugels (born 1993), Belgian cyclist
