= Probability and Mathematical Statistics =

Journal covering the mathematical aspect of the probability theory

- Discipline: Mathematics
- Language: English
- Edited by: K. Bogdan (Wrocław), M. Musiela (Oxford), J. Rosiński (Knoxville), W. Szczotka (Wrocław), and W.A. Woyczyński (Cleveland)

Publication details
- History: 1980–present
- Publisher: Wrocław University and Wrocław University of Science and Technology (Poland)
- Frequency: Biannually
- Open access: Open access
- Impact factor: 0.617 (2019)

Standard abbreviations
- ISO 4: Probab. Math. Stat.
- MathSciNet: Probab. Math. Statist.

Indexing
- ISSN: 0208-4147 (print); 2300-8113 (web)
- Probability and Mathematical Statistics
- ISSN: 2300-8113

Links
- Journal homepage; BazTech; Online archive

Probability and Mathematical Statistics is a peer-reviewed scientific journal covering mathematical aspects of the probability theory. It was founded in 1980 as the initiative of the Wrocław probability community led by Kazimierz Urbanik and Czesław Ryll-Nardzewski, and statistics community represented by Witold Klonecki. They served as editors of the journal during the first twenty-five years of its existence, with Kazimierz Urbanik shouldering the role of the editor-in-chief. Beginning with 2007, Probability and Mathematical Statistics became an affiliated journal of the Institute of Mathematical Statistics. PMS (ISSN 0208-4147) is indexed by Scopus, MathSciNet, Index Copernicus and Journal Citation Reports (IF=0.617). PMS is an open-access journal.

== Abstracting and indexing ==
The journal is abstracted and indexed in

- JCR
- MathSciNet
- Zentralblatt MATH
- SCOPUS

== See also ==
- List of mathematical physics journals
- List of probability journals
- List of statistics journals
