= EJP =

EJP may refer to:

== Scholarly journals ==
- Electronic Journal of Probability
- European Journal of Personality
- European Journal of Philosophy
- European Journal of Physics
- European Journal of Pharmacology

== Other uses ==
- United National Party (Sinhalese: Eksath Jathika Pakshaya), a political party in Sri Lanka
- European Jewish Parliament, a non-governmental organization
- Eurojackpot, transnational European lottery
- EJewish Philanthropy, a news website
