= Toninelli =

Toninelli is an Italian surname. Notable people with the surname include:

- Cristina Toninelli, Italian mathematician
- Danilo Toninelli (born 1974), Italian politician
- Dario Toninelli (born 1992), Italian footballer
- Marcello Toninelli (born 1950), Italian comics writer
