= Andrew Berry =

Andrew Berry may refer to:

- Andrew Berry (biologist) (born 1963), British evolutionary biologist and historian
- Andrew Berry (American football) (born 1987), American football executive
- Andrew C. Berry (1906–1998), American mathematician
