= Marcel F. Neuts =

Belgian-American mathematician (1935–2014)

Marcel Fernand Neuts
- Born: 21 February 1935; Ostend, West Flanders, Belgium
- Died: March 9, 2014 (aged 79); Tucson, Arizona, USA
- Education: KU Leuven; Stanford University
- Known for: Markov arrival process Matrix geometric method
- Scientific career
- Institutions: Purdue University; University of Delaware; University of Arizona
- Doctoral advisor: Samuel Karlin
- Doctoral students: Jozef Teugels

Marcel Fernand Neuts (21 February 1935 – 9 March 2014) was a Belgian-American mathematician and probability theorist. He is known for contributions in algorithmic probability, stochastic processes, and queuing theory.

== Education and career ==
Neuts was born in Ostend, Belgium and studied at the KU Leuven. He moved to the US in 1956 along with his wife Olga. He was admitted to graduate programs at Stanford University and received his MSc in 1959 and PhD at the same place in 1961, just two years after the MSc degree, under the supervision of Samuel Karlin. He held positions at Purdue University from 1962 to 1976, the University of Delaware from 1976 to 1985, and at the Department of Systems and Industrial Engineering at the University of Arizona from 1985 until his retirement in 1997.

== Honors and awards ==
Neuts received the Lester R. Ford Award from the Mathematical Association of America in 1969. Neuts served as the chairman of the Applied Probability Society of the Institute for Operations Research and the Management Sciences between 1977 and 1978. He received the Alexander von Humboldt Fellowship in 1983 to conduct research at the University of Stuttgart. He was the founding editor of the journal Stochastic Models and a contributing editor for Journal of Applied Probability and Advances in Applied Probability.

The journal Stochastic Models has established a prize after Neuts for best papers published in the journal.

== Bibliography ==
- Neuts, Marcel F. (1973). Probability. Boston, MA: Allyn and Bacon.
- Neuts, Marcel F., ed. (1977). Algorithmic methods in probability. TIMS Studies in the management sciences. Amsterdam: North-Holland Publ. ISBN 978-0-444-85049-2.
- Neuts, Marcel F. (1989). Structured stochastic matrices of M/G/1 type and their applications. Probability, pure and applied. New York, NY: Dekker. ISBN 978-0-8247-8283-2.
- Neuts, Marcel F. (1994). Matrix-geometric solutions in stochastic models: an algorithmic approach. Dover books on advanced mathematics. New York, NY: Dover Publications. ISBN 978-0-486-68342-3.
- Neuts, Marcel F. (1995). Algorithmic probability: a collection of problems. Stochastic modeling series (1st ed.). London Weinheim: Chapman & Hall. ISBN 978-0-412-99691-7.
