= Waymire =

Waymire is a surname. Notable people with the surname include:

- Edward C. Waymire, American mathematician
- Frederick Waymire (1807–1873), American farmer and politician
- Kellie Waymire (1967–2003), American actress
- Ruth Waymire (1960–1984), American murder victim
