= Patricia Gonçalves (mathematician) =

Portuguese mathematician

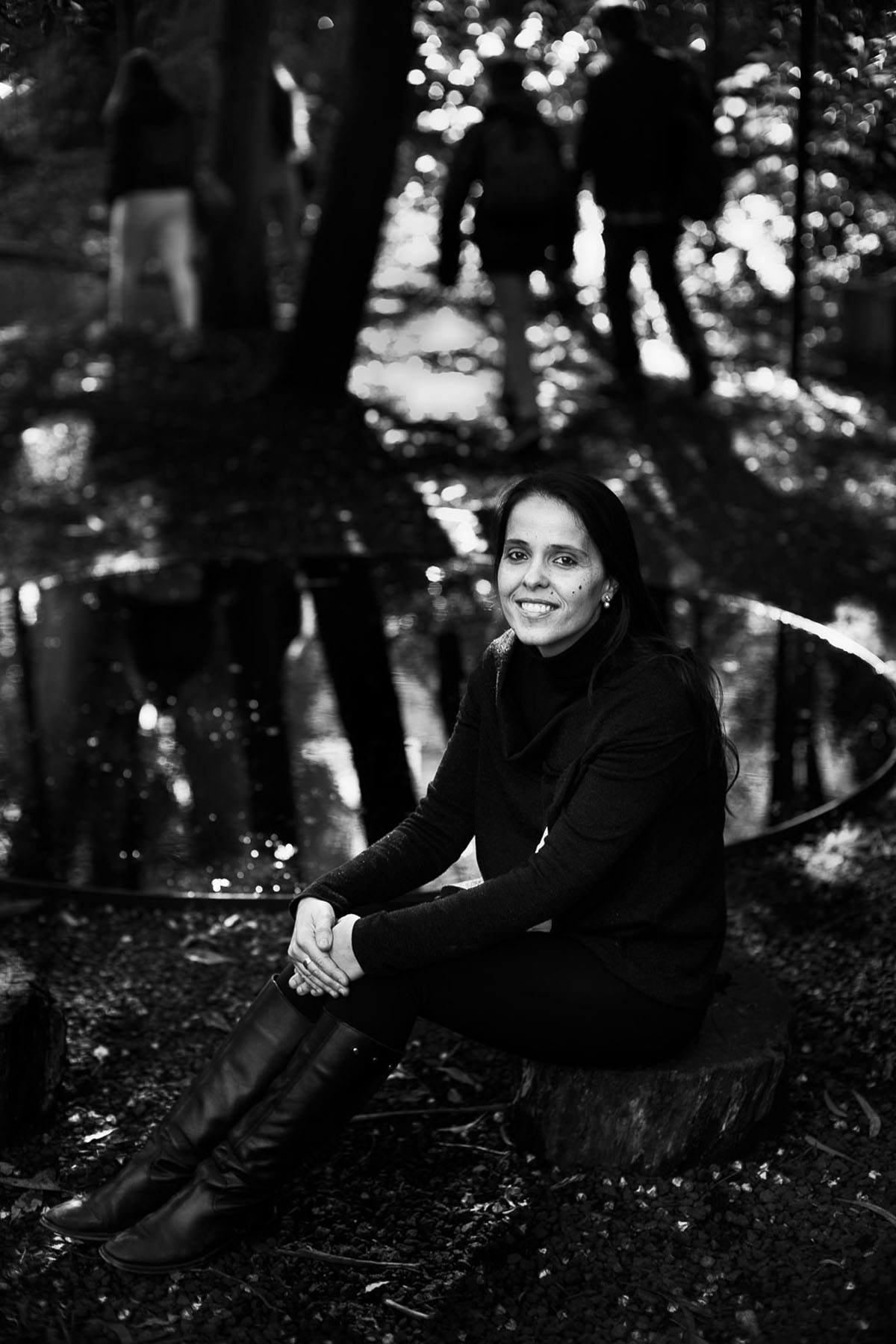
Gonçalves in 2016

Ana Patrícia Carvalho Gonçalves is a Portuguese mathematician who works as a professor of mathematics at the Instituto Superior Técnico of the University of Lisbon. Her research concerns probability theory, and particularly the macroscopic properties of stochastic processes involving particle systems.

== Early life, education, and career ==
Gonçalves is originally from Esposende, in Portugal. Her father owned a shoe company and her mother was a teacher. Her father died when she was young, of primary amyloidosis, leading her to aim for a career in medicine. However, this disruption in her life caused her schoolwork to suffer, and her scores were not high enough for medical school. Instead she went into mathematics at the University of Porto, inspired by one of her high school teachers.

After taking a summer course in measure theory from Cláudio Landim at the Instituto Nacional de Matemática Pura e Aplicada (IMPA) in Rio de Janeiro, Brazil, she went to IMPA for her doctoral studies. She completed her PhD there in 2007. Her dissertation, supervised by Landim, was Central Limit Theorem for a Tagged Particle in Asymmetric Simple Exclusion.

She became a postdoctoral researcher at the University of São Paulo in Brazil and the University of Minho in Portugal, and taught at the Pontifical Catholic University of Rio de Janeiro before returning to Portugal and taking her present position at the Instituto Superior Técnico.

Gonçalves is the editor-in-chief of Electronic Communications in Probability for 2024–2026.

== Recognition ==
She was an invited speaker at the 2022 (virtual) International Congress of Mathematicians, and is the 2024 Schramm Lecturer of the Institute of Mathematical Statistics and the Bernoulli Society at the 11th World Congress in Probability and Statistics.
