= Spring Research Conference =

American statistics conference

The IMS/ASA Spring Research Conference (SRC) is an annual conference sponsored by the American Statistical Association (ASA) Section on Physical and Engineering Sciences (SPES) and the Institute of Mathematical Statistics (IMS). The goal of the SRC is to promote cross-disciplinary statistical research in engineering, science and technology. The topics broadly cover a wide range of research areas including design and analysis of experiments, uncertainty quantification, computer experiment, machine learning, quality control, reliability modeling, and statistical computing, with the applications in business, industry, environment, information technology and advanced manufacturing. The SRC also regularly has invited sessions organized by editors of the top journals including Technometrics, Journal of Quality Technology, and SIAM/ASA Journal on Uncertainty Quantification. The SRC has the tradition to support students and postdocs with scholarships to selected participants who present contributed talks or posters at the conference.

About every three or four years, the Spring Research Conference (SRC) and the Quality and Productivity Research Conference (QPRC) have a joint conference together as the Joint Research Conference (JRC). The QPRC is an annual conference sponsored by the American Statistical Association's Section on Quality and Productivity.

== History ==
The SRC was the brainchild of Jeff Wu and Vijay Nair. Its precursor was the 1992 IMS Regional Meeting-Special Topics in Industrial Statistics in Philadelphia, which was initiated by Jeff Wu and program co-chaired by Vijay Nair and Jeff Wu. The inaugural conference was held in Chapel Hill, North Carolina, in June, 1994, with Dr. Rob Easterling as the program chair and Dr. Jerry Sacks as the local organizer. The long-term welfare of the conference is handled by a conference management committee. The members of the first conference management committee were Drs. Vijay Nair (Chair), Jon Kettenring, Jerry Lawless, Jeff Robinson, Daryl Pregibon, and Jeff Wu. The past management committee chairs include Vijay Nair, Alan Karr, Rob Easterling, Shane Reese, Peter Chien, and Xinwei Deng. The conference completed its 25th anniversary in Santa Fe, New Mexico, in 2018.

== Meetings during COVID-19 pandemic ==
Due to the COVID-19 pandemic, the SRC 2020 was cancelled, which was originally planned to be hosted by the Department of Mathematics and Statistics at Oakland University in Rochester, Michigan, from May 20–22, 2020. The SRC 2021 was cancelled again due to the COVID-19 pandemic. The SRC 2022 was organized as a virtual meeting on May 19–20, 2022. In 2023, the SRC returned to in-person meetings, taking place at Banff Center on May 24–26, 2023.

== Future meetings ==
The JRC 2027 will be hosted by the Department of Statistics at University of Connecticut on June 21–24, 2027.

== Past conferences ==
Dates	Location	Host	Website
May 26–28, 2026	Clemson, South Carolina	Clemson University	SRC 2026
June 3–5, 2025	New York City, New York	Baruch College	SRC 2025
June 17–20, 2024	Waterloo, Ontario	University of Waterloo	JRC 2024
May 24–26, 2023	Banff, Alberta	Banff Centre	SRC 2023
May 19–20, 2022	Virtual	Virtual	SRC 2022
May 22–24, 2019	Blacksburg, Virginia	Virginia Tech	SRC 2019
June 11–14, 2018	Santa Fe, New Mexico	Los Alamos National Laboratory	JRC 2018
May 17–19, 2017	New Brunswick, New Jersey	Rutgers University	SRC 2017
May 25–27, 2016	Chicago, Illinois	Illinois Institute of Technology	SRC 2016
May 20–22, 2015	Cincinnati, Ohio	Procter & Gamble Company	SRC 2015
June 24–26, 2014	Seattle, Washington	University of Washington	JRC 2014
June 20–22, 2013	Los Angeles, California	University of California-Los Angeles	SRC 2013
June 13–15, 2012	Cambridge, Massachusetts	Harvard University	SRC 2012
June 22–24, 2011	Evanston, Illinois	Northwestern University	SRC 2011
May 25–27, 2010	Gaithersburg, Maryland	National Institute of Standards and Technology	JRC 2010
May 27–29, 2009	Vancouver, Canada	Simon Fraser University	SRC 2009
May 19–21, 2008	Atlanta, Georgia	Georgia Institute of Technology	SRC 2008
May 21–23, 2007	Ames, Iowa	Iowa State University	[SRC 2007]
June 7–9, 2006	Knoxville, Tennessee	University of Tennessee-Knoxville	JRC 2006
June 1–3, 2005	Park City, Utah	University of Utah	[SRC 2005]
May 19–21, 2004	Gaithersburg, Maryland	National Institute of Standards and Technology	[SRC 2004]
