= Arne Beurling =

Swedish mathematician (1905–1986)

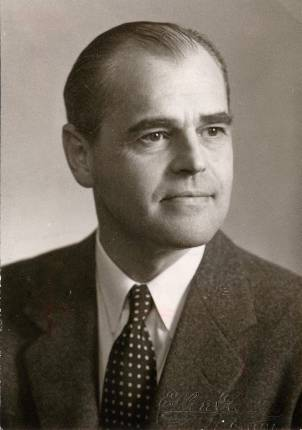
- Arne Beurling in 1940s
- Born: 3 February 1905; Gothenburg, Sweden
- Died: 20 November 1986 (aged 81); Princeton, New Jersey, United States
- Education: Uppsala University
- Known for: Beurling algebra Beurling factorization Beurling–Lax theorem Beurling–Nyman criterion
- Scientific career
- Fields: Mathematics
- Workplaces: Uppsala University; Institute for Advanced Study
- Doctoral advisor: Anders Wiman
- Doctoral students: Lennart Carleson; Carl-Gustav Esseen

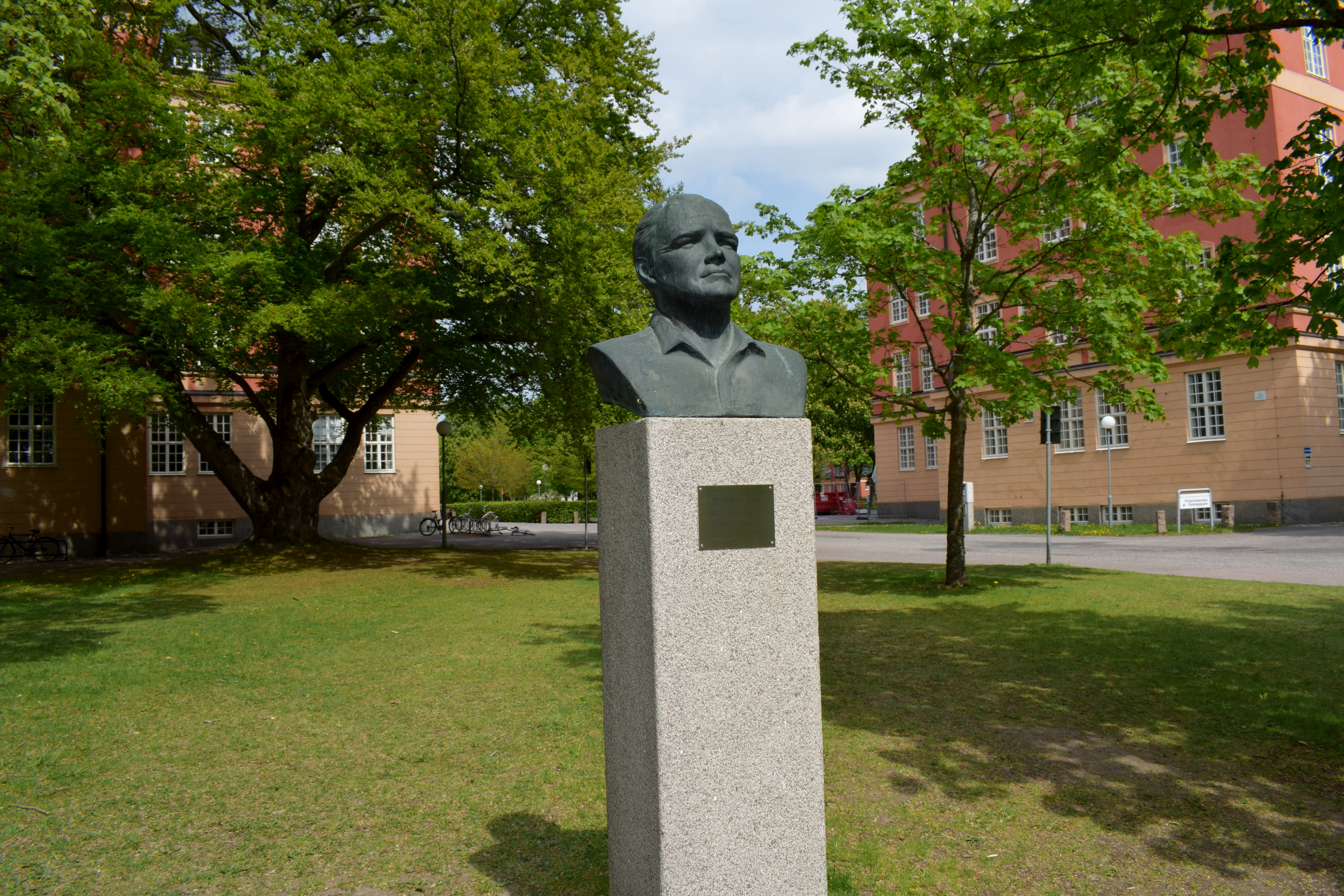
Statue of Arne Beurling in Uppsala.

Arne Carl-August Beurling (3 February 1905 – 20 November 1986) was a Swedish mathematician and professor of mathematics at Uppsala University (1937–1954) and later at the Institute for Advanced Study in Princeton, New Jersey. Beurling worked extensively in harmonic analysis, complex analysis and potential theory. The "Beurling factorization" helped mathematical scientists to understand the Wold decomposition, and inspired further work on the invariant subspaces of linear operators and operator algebras, e.g. Håkan Hedenmalm's factorization theorem for Bergman spaces.

He is perhaps most famous for single-handedly decrypting an early version of the German cipher machine Siemens and Halske T52 in a matter of two weeks during 1940, using only pen and paper. This machine's cipher is generally considered to be more complicated than that of the more famous Enigma machine. Beurling's method of decrypting military telegrams between Norway and Germany worked from June 1940 right up until 1943 when the Germans changed equipment.

== Early life ==
Beurling was born on 3 February 1905 in Gothenburg, Sweden and was the son of the landowner Konrad Beurling and baroness Elsa Raab. After graduating in 1924, he was enrolled at the Uppsala University where he received a Bachelor of Arts degree in 1926 and two years later a Licentiate of Philosophy degree.

== Career ==
=== Early career ===
Beurling was assistant teacher at Uppsala University from 1931 to 1933. He received his doctorate in mathematics in 1933 for his dissertation Études sur un problème de majoration. Beurling was a docent of mathematics at Uppsala University from 1933 and then professor of mathematics from 1937 to 1954.

=== World War II ===
In the summer of 1940 he single-handedly deciphered and reverse-engineered an early version of the Siemens and Halske T52 also known as the Geheimfernschreiber ("secret teletypewriter") used by Nazi Germany in World War II for sending ciphered messages. The T52 was one of the so-called "Fish cyphers", that, using transposition, created nearly one quintillion (893,622,318,929,520,960) different variations. It took Beurling two weeks to solve the problem using pen and paper. Beurling, who had academic knowledge of the German language, proceeded in the classic way when deciphering a code: By trying to identify high-frequency or unusually long words, and based on some hypotheses, making formulas and tables to test them against other coded messages. Using Beurling's work, a device was created that enabled Sweden to decipher German teleprinter traffic passing through Sweden from Norway on a cable. In this way, Swedish authorities knew about Operation Barbarossa before it occurred. Since the Swedes would not reveal how this knowledge was attained, the Swedish warning was not treated as credible by Soviets.

This became the foundation for the Swedish National Defence Radio Establishment (FRA). The cypher in the Geheimfernschreiber is generally considered to be more complex than the cypher used in the Enigma machines.

=== Later life ===
He was visiting professor at Harvard University from 1948 to 1949. From 1954, he was professor at the Institute for Advanced Study in Princeton, New Jersey, United States, where he took over Albert Einstein's office.

He was the doctoral advisor of Lennart Carleson and Carl-Gustav Esseen. Carleson, the 2006 winner of the Abel Prize, described Beurling as “one of the few persons [of whom] I would use the word ‘genius’,” adding that “mathematics was part of his personality.”

== Personal life ==
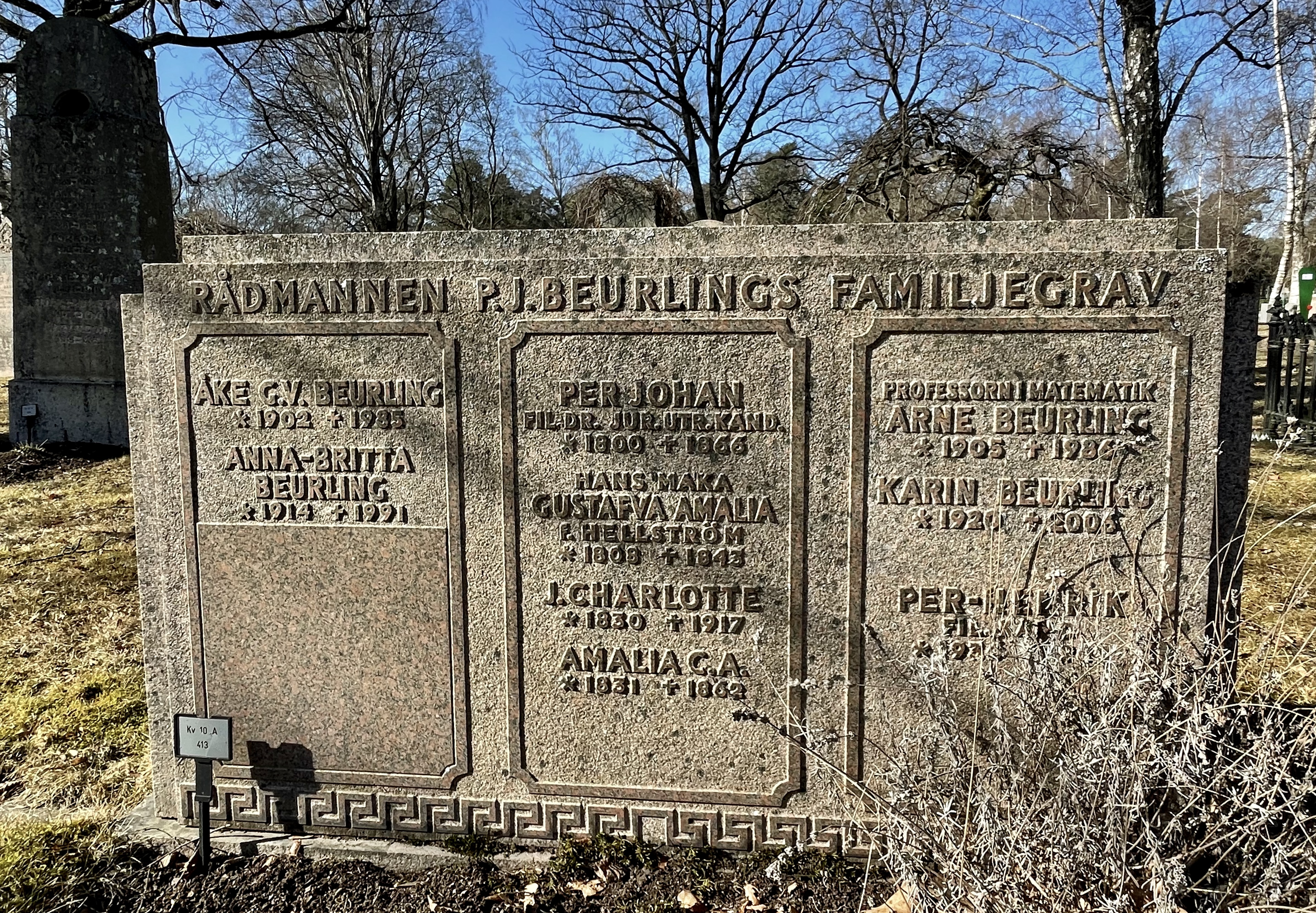
Arne Beurling´s family grave at Norra begravningsplatsen in Solna.

Arne Beurling was first married (1936–40) to Britta Östberg (born 1907), daughter of Henrik Östberg and Gerda Nilsson. In 1950, he married Karin Lindblad (1920–2006), daughter of ironmonger Henric Lindblad and Wanja Bengtsson. Karin was a distinguished Ph.D. student from Uppsala University. When they lived in Princeton, she worked in a biochemistry lab at Princeton University. He had two children from his first marriage — Pehr-Henrik (1936–1962) and Jane (1938–1992).

Beurling's great-grandfather was Pehr Henrik Beurling (1758 or 1763–1806), who founded a high quality clock factory in Stockholm in 1783.

== Death ==
Arne Beurling died in 1986 and was buried at Norra begravningsplatsen in Solna.

== In popular culture ==
Beurling's prowess as a cryptanalyst is the subject of the 2005 short opera Krypto CEG by Jonas Sjöstrand and Kimmo Eriksson.

== Awards and decorations ==
- Knight of the Order of the Polar Star
- Knight of the Order of Vasa

== Honours ==
- Honorary member of the Göteborgs nation at Uppsala University (1937)
- Member of the Royal Swedish Academy of Sciences (1937)
- Member of the Royal Society of the Humanities at Lund (Kungliga Humanistiska Vetenskapssamfundet i Lund) (1937)
- Member of the Finnish Society of Sciences and Letters (1942)
- Member of the Royal Physiographic Society in Lund (1948)
- Member of the Royal Danish Academy of Sciences and Letters (1951)
- Fellow of the American Academy of Arts and Sciences (1970)

== See also ==
- Beurling zeta function
- Beurling transform
