= Carl-Gustav Esseen =

Swedish mathematician (1918–2001)

Carl-Gustav Esseen (13 September 1918 in Linköping – 10 November 2001) was a Swedish mathematician. His work was in the theory of probability. The Berry–Esseen theorem is named after him.

== Life ==
Carl-Gustav Esseen attended school in Linköping. Starting in 1936, he studied mathematics, astronomy, physics and chemistry at the University of Uppsala. Inspired by the harmonic-analytic research of Harald Cramér and Arne Beurling, Esseen examined the accuracy of the approximation to the normal distribution in the central limit theorem in the case of independent and identically distributed summands. Esseen's bound is now called "the Berry-Esseen theorem", because it was independently proved by Andrew C. Berry, also.

In 1944 Esseen received his doctorate with a thesis on the Fourier analysis of probability distributions. In 1949 he was appointed full professor of applied mathematics at the Royal Institute of Technology in Stockholm. In 1962 his professorship moved to the field of mathematical statistics and in 1967, he became first holder of the chair of mathematical statistics at the University of Uppsala. He retired in 1984.

== Scientific work ==
Although Esseen worked mostly on the central limit theorem and related topics, he also worked in other areas. Some industrial applications were considered in his writings, for example, his studies on control theory and in telecommunications. After retirement, Esseen worked on topics from number theory, especially factorization, a topic of importance in cryptology.

Esseen supervised several doctoral students. His lectures and writings were meticulously prepared and delivered.

== Honours ==
- 1963: Elected Member of the Royal Swedish Academy of Engineering Sciences.

== Selected works ==
- "On the Liapounoff limit of error in the theory of probability", Arkiv för Mathematik, Astronomi och Fysik 28A, #9 (1942), 19 pp., MR 0011909.
- "Determination of the maximum deviation from the Gaussian law", Arkiv för Mathematik, Astronomi och Fysik 29A, #20 (1943), 10 pp., MR 0011910.
- "Fourier analysis of distribution functions. A mathematical study of the Laplace–Gaussian law", Acta Mathematica 77, #1 (December 1945), pp. 1–125, MR 0014626, doi:10.1007/BF02392223. (Dissertation)
- "On mean central limit theorems", Kungl. Tekn. Högsk. Handl. Stockholm #121 (1958), 31 pp., MR 0097111.
- "Bounds for the absolute third moment", Scandinavian Journal of Statistics (ISSN 0303-6898) 2, #3 (1975), pp. 149–152, MR 0383495, JSTOR 4615595.
- (with Svante Janson) "On moment conditions for normed sums of independent variables and martingale differences", Stochastic Processes and their Applications 19, #1 (1985), pp. 173–182, MR 0780729, doi:10.1016/0304-4149(85)90048-1.
- "A stochastic model for primitive roots", Revue Roumaine de Mathématiques Pures et Appliquées 38, #6 (1993), pp. 481–501, MR 1258051.
