= Urbanik =

Urbanik is a patronymic surname derived from the given name Urban. Notable people with the surname include:

- Danuta Urbanik (born 1989), Polish middle-distance runner
- Kazimierz Urbanik (1930–2005), Polish mathematician
- Mária Urbanik (born 1967), Hungarian racewalker
- Sándor Urbanik (born 1964), Hungarian racewalker
