= Harald Bergström =

Swedish mathematician (1908–2001)

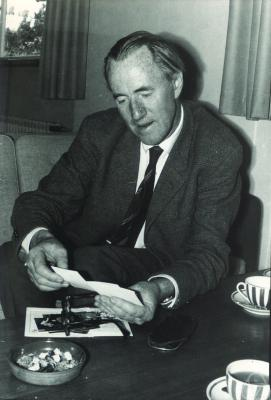
- Bergström in 1962
- Born: April 1, 1908; Mölltorp, Sweden
- Died: May 23, 2001 (aged 93); Gothenburg, Sweden
- Education: Uppsala University
- Scientific career
- Institutions: Uppsala University; Chalmers University of Technology
- Doctoral advisor: Trygve Nagell
- Doctoral students: Olav Kallenberg; Peter Jagers

Harald Bergström (1 April 1908 – 23 May 2001) was a Swedish mathematician, specializing in probability theory.

== Education and career ==
Harald Bergström studied mathematics, physics and chemistry at the Uppsala University and received in 1931 his master's degree. From 1932 to 1934 he taught at secondary schools and then worked as a research assistant at the Uppsala University. There he received his Ph.D. in 1938 and taught until 1945.

In 1946 he moved to Chalmers University of Technology in Göteborg, where in 1949 he was appointed a professor of applied mathematics. In 1960 he was also appointed a professor for numerical analysis and mathematical statistics. In 1974 he retired as professor emeritus.

At the University of Uppsala, Harald Bergström did research mainly on algebraic number fields and related topics. After his move to Chalmers University of Technology, he focused on probability theory and statistics. He was supervisor to Peter Jagers. He made important contributions to central limit theorems and the theory of alpha stable distributions. The widely used Bergström's inequality is named, amongst others, after him.

He was an invited speaker at the International Congress of Mathematicians in 1936 at Oslo and in 1950 at Cambridge, Massachusetts. In 1973 Chalmers University of Technology published a book of essays in honour of his sixty-fifth birthday.

== Selected publications ==
=== Books ===
- Limit Theorems for Convolutions. Almqvist och Wicksell, Stockholm, und Wiley, New York 1963.
- Weak Convergence of Measures. Academic Press, New York 1982.

=== Articles ===
- Zur Theorie der biquadratischen Zahlkörper. Die Arithmetik auf klassenkörpertheoretischer Grundlage. Dissertation. In: Nova Acta Regiae Societatis Scientiarum Upsaliensis. Series 4, Volume 10, No. 8. Almqvist & Wiksell, Uppsala 1937.
- Über die Methode von Woronoj zur Berechnung einer Basis eines kubischen Zahlkörpers. In: Arkiv för matematik, astronomi och fysik. Volume 25B, No. 26. Almqvist & Wiksell, Stockholm 1937.
- Vereinfachter Beweis des Hauptidealsatzes der Klassenkörpertheorie. In: Arkiv för matematik, astronomi och fysik. Volume 29B, No. 6. Almqvist & Wiksell, Stockholm 1943.
- Struktur der Erweiterungen abelscher Gruppen. In: Arkiv för matematik, astronomi och fysik. Volume 30, No. 4. Almqvist & Wiksell, Stockholm 1944.
- On the central limit theorem. Scandinavian Actuarial Journal Vol. 27, 1944. doi:10.1080/03461238.1944.10404925
- On the central limit theorem in the space R_{k}, k > 1 Scandinavian Actuarial Journal Vol. 28, 1945, pp. 106–127. doi:10.1080/03461238.1945.10404921
- On the central limit theorem in the case of not equally distributed random variables. Scandinavian Actuarial Journal Vol. 32, 1949, pp. 37–62. doi:10.1080/03461238.1949.10419757
- On some Expansions of stable distribution functions. In: Arkiv för matematik. Vol. 2, No. 18. Almqvist & Wiksell, Stockholm 1952, pp. 375–378.
- Eine Theorie der stabilen Verteilungsfunktionen. In: Archiv der Mathematik. Volume 2, 1953, pp. 380–391.
- On the limit theorem for convolutions of distribution functions. In: Journal für die Reine und Angewandte Mathematik.
  Part 1: 1957 Vol. 198, pp. 121–142.
  Part 2: 1958 Vol. 199, pp. 1–22.
- Bergström, H. (1970). "A comparison method for distribution functions of sums of independent and dependent random variables". Theory of Probability & Its Applications. 15 (3): 430–457. doi:10.1137/1115048.
