= Yuliya Mishura =

Ukrainian mathematician

Yuliya Stepanivna Mishura (Ukrainian: Юлія Степанівна Мішура) is a Ukrainian mathematician specializing in probability theory and mathematical finance. She is a professor at the Taras Shevchenko National University of Kyiv.

== Education and career ==
Mishura earned a Ph.D. in 1978 from the Taras Shevchenko National University of Kyiv with a dissertation on Limit Theorems for Functionals from Stochastic Fields supervised by Dmitrii Sergeevich Silvestrov. She earned a Dr. Sci. from the National Academy of Sciences of Ukraine in 1990 with a dissertation Martingale Methods in the Theory of Stochastic Fields.

She became an assistant professor in the Faculty of Mechanics and Mathematics at National Taras Shevchenko University of Kyiv in 1976. She has been a full professor since 1991, and head of the Department of Probability, Statistics and Actuarial Mathematics since 2003.

With Kęstutis Kubilius, she is the founding co-editor-in-chief of the journal Modern Stochastics: Theory and Applications. She is the editor-in-chief of the journal Theory of Probability and Mathematical Statistics.

== Books ==
Mishura is the author of many monographs and textbooks. They include:

- Discrete-Time Approximations and Limit Theorems In Applications to Financial Markets (with Kostiantyn Ralchenko, De Gruyter Series in Probability and Stochastics, 2021)
- Asymptotic Analysis of Unstable Solutions of Stochastic Differential Equations (with G. Kulinich, S. Kushnirenko, Vol.9 Bocconi & Springer Series, Mathematics, Statistics, Finance and Economics, 2020)
- Fractional Brownian Motion. Approximations and Projections (with Oksana Banna, Kostiantyn Ralchenko, Sergiy Shklyar, Wiley-ISTE, 2019)
- Stochastic Analysis of Mixed Fractional Gaussian Processes (ISTE Press, 2018)
- Theory and Statistical Applications of Stochastic Processes (with Georgiy Shevchenko, ISTE Press and John Wiley & Sons, 2017)
- Parameter Estimation in Fractional Diffusion Models (with Kęstutis Kubilius and Kostiantyn Ralchenko, Bocconi University Press and Springer, 2017)
- Ruin Probabilities: Smoothness, Bounds, Supermartingale Approach (with Olena Ragulina, ISTE Press, 2016)
- Financial Mathematics: Optimization in Insurance and Finance Set (ISTE Press, 2016)
- Theory of Stochastic Processes: With Applications to Financial Mathematics And Risk Theory (with Gusak, Kukush, Kulik, and Pilipenko, Problem Books in Mathematics, Springer, 2010)
- Stochastic Calculus for Fractional Brownian Motion and Related Processes (Lecture Notes in Mathematics 1929, Springer, 2008)
