= Brownian web =

The Brownian web: coalesing Brownian motions started from every point in space and time

In probability theory, the Brownian web is an uncountable collection of one-dimensional coalescing Brownian motions, starting from every point in space and time. It arises as the diffusive space-time scaling limit of a collection of coalescing random walks, with one walk starting from each point of the integer lattice Z at each time.

== History and Basic Description ==
Graphical construction of the voter model with configuration $\eta_t:=(\eta_t(x))_{x\in \Z} \in \{0,1\}^\Z$ . The arrows determine when a voter changes its opinion to that of the neighbor pointed to by the arrow. The genealogies are obtained by following the arrows backwards in time, which are distributed as coalescing random walks.

What is now known as the Brownian web was first conceived by Arratia in his Ph.D. thesis and a subsequent incomplete and unpublished manuscript. Arratia studied the voter model, an interacting particle system that models the evolution of a population's political opinions. The individuals of the population are represented by the vertices of a graph, and each individual carries one of two possible opinions, represented as either 0 or 1. Independently at rate 1, each individual changes its opinion to that of a randomly chosen neighbor. The voter model is known to be dual to coalescing random walks (i.e., the random walks move independently when they are apart, and move as a single walk once they meet) in the sense that: each individual's opinion at any time can be traced backwards in time to an ancestor at time 0, and the joint genealogies of the opinions of different individuals at different times is a collection of coalescing random walks evolving backwards in time. In spatial dimension 1, coalescing random walks starting from a finite number of space-time points converge to a finite number of coalescing Brownian motions, if space-time is rescaled diffusively (i.e., each space-time point (x,t) gets mapped to (εx,ε^2t), with ε↓0). This is a consequence of Donsker's invariance principle. The less obvious question is:

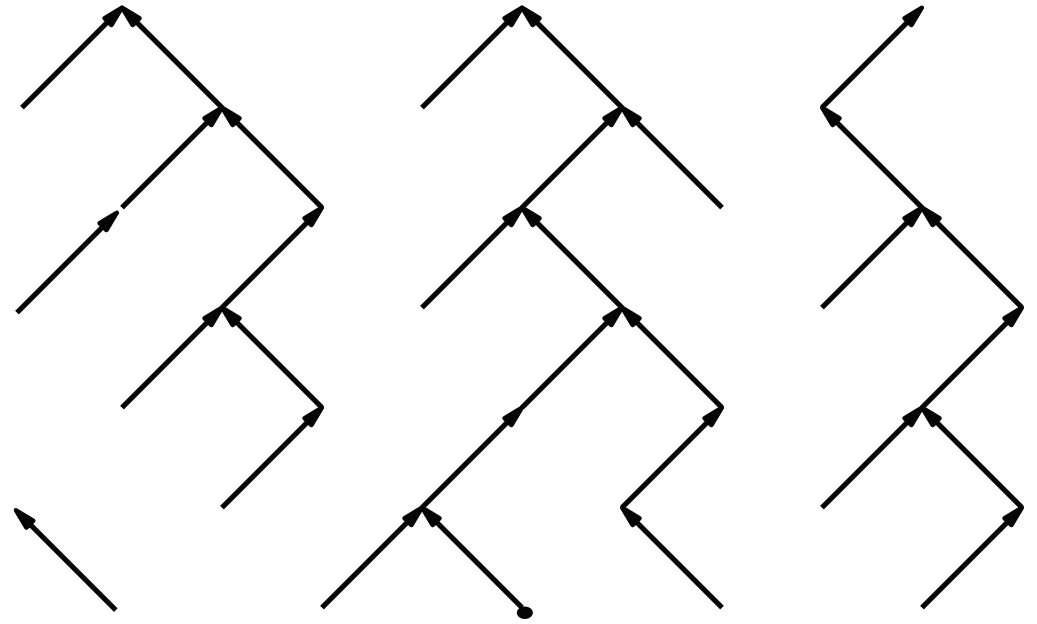
Coalescing random walks on the discrete space-time lattice $\Z^2_{\rm even}:=\{(x,n)\in\Z^2: x+n \mbox{ is even}\}.$ From each lattice point, an arrow is drawn either up-right or up-left with probability 1/2 each. The random walks move upward in time by following the arrows, and different random walks coalesce once they meet.

What is the diffusive scaling limit of the joint collection of one-dimensional coalescing random walks starting from every point in space-time?

Arratia set out to construct this limit, which is what we now call the Brownian web. Formally speaking, it is a collection of one-dimensional coalescing Brownian motions starting from every space-time point in $\R^2$. The fact that the Brownian web consists of an uncountable number of Brownian motions is what makes the construction highly non-trivial. Arratia gave a construction but was unable to prove convergence of coalescing random walks to a limiting object and characterize such a limiting object.

Tóth and Werner in their study of the true self-repelling motion obtained many detailed properties of this limiting object and its dual but did not prove convergence of coalescing walks to this limiting object or characterize it. The main difficulty in proving convergence stems from the existence of random points from which the limiting object can have multiple paths. Arratia and Tóth and Werner were aware of the existence of such points and they provided different conventions to avoid such multiplicity. Fontes, Isopi, Newman and Ravishankar introduced a topology for the limiting object so that it is realized as a random variable taking values in a Polish space, in this case, the space of compact sets of paths. This choice allows for the limiting object to have multiple paths from a random space time point. The introduction of this topology allowed them to prove the convergence of the coalescing random walks to a unique limiting object and characterize it. They named this limiting object Brownian web.

An extension of the Brownian web, called the Brownian net, has been introduced by Sun and Swart by allowing the coalescing Brownian motions to undergo branching. An alternative construction of the Brownian net was given by Newman, Ravishankar and Schertzer.

For a recent survey, see Schertzer, Sun and Swart.
