= American Statistical Association =

American professional organization of statisticians

- Abbreviation: ASA
- Formation: 1839
- Headquarters: Alexandria, Virginia
- President: Jeri Mulrow (2026)
- Website: www.amstat.org

The American Statistical Association (ASA) is the main professional organization for statisticians and related professionals in the United States. It was founded in Boston, Massachusetts, on November 27, 1839, and is the second-oldest continuously operating professional society in the U.S. behind the Massachusetts Medical Society (founded in 1781). ASA services statisticians, quantitative scientists, and users of statistics across many academic areas and applications. The association publishes a variety of journals and sponsors several international conferences every year.

== Mission ==
The organization's mission is to promote good application of statistical science, specifically to:

- support excellence in statistical practice, research, journals, and meetings
- work for the improvement of statistical education at all levels
- promote the proper application of statistics
- anticipate and meet member needs
- use the discipline of statistics to enhance human welfare
- seek opportunities to advance the statistics profession

== Membership ==
As of 2022, the ASA membership exceeds 19,000 professionals found in government, academia, and the private sector.

=== Corporate supporters ===
Organizational members and corporate supporters of the ASA include AstraZeneca, Merck & Co., the National Security Agency, Pfizer, RTI International, StataCorp and Westat.

=== Justice, Diversity, Equity, and Inclusion ===
In November 2018, ASA Board of Directors approved a code of conduct statement on Justice, Equity, Diversity, and Inclusion (JEDI). It was reviewed and updated by ASA BOD in 2019, 2021, and most recently in 2023.

In June 2020, the R. A. Fisher Award and Lectureship was changed to COPSS Distinguished Achievement Award and Lectureship. The change follows discussions about Fisher's views on race and eugenics.

In 2021, ASA established the Justice, Equity, Diversity, and Inclusion Outreach Group, known as the JEDI Outreach Group.

== Fellowship ==
New Fellowships of the ASA are granted annually by the ASA Committee on Fellows. Candidates must have been members for the preceding three years but may be nominated by anyone. The maximum number of recipients each year is one-third of one percent of the ASA membership.

== Organizational structure ==
ASA is organized in Sections, Chapters and Committees. Chapters are arranged geographically, representing 78 areas across the US and Canada. An example of an early and large chapter is the SoCalASA. Sections are subject-area and industry-area interest groups covering 22 sub-disciplines. ASA has more than 60 committees coordinating meetings, publications, education, careers, and special-interest topics involving statisticians.

ASA is a member society of the Conference Board of the Mathematical Sciences.

== Accredited Professional Statistician ==
As of April 2010, the ASA offers the Accredited Professional Statistician status (PStat), to members who meet the ASA's credentialing requirements, which include an advanced degree in statistics or related quantitative field, five years of documented experience, and evidence of professional competence. To apply for continuing accreditation, PStat members are expected to complete 60 hours of professional development activities each year.

The ASA also offers the Graduate Statistician status (GStat) as of April 2014. It serves as a preparatory accreditation suitable for graduate students.

A list of PStat and GStat accredited members is available on the ASA website.

== Publications ==
The ASA publishes several scientific journals:

- Journal of the American Statistical Association (JASA)
- The American Statistician (TAS)
- Journal of Business & Economic Statistics (JBES)
- Journal of Computational and Graphical Statistics (JCGS)
- Technometrics (TECH)
- Journal of Nonparametric Statistics
- Statistical Analysis and Data Mining (The ASA Data Science Journal)
- Statistics in Biopharmaceutical Research (SBR)
- ASA Discoveries

Online-only journals:

- Journal of Statistics and Data Science Education (JSDSE)
- Statistics and Public Policy

Co-Published journals:

- Journal of Agricultural, Biological, and Environmental Statistics, co-sponsored with the International Biometric Society
- Journal of Educational and Behavioral Statistics, co-sponsored with the American Educational Research Association
- SIAM/ASA Journal on Uncertainty Quantification, co-sponsored with the Society for Industrial and Applied Mathematics
- Journal of Survey Statistics and Methodology (JSSAM), co-sponsored with the American Association for Public Opinion Research
- Journal of Quantitative Analysis in Sports (JQAS)
- Statistics Surveys, co-sponsored with the Bernoulli Society, the Institute of Mathematical Statistics, and the Statistical Society of Canada (online-only)

The ASA co-sponsors the Current Index to Statistics (CIS)

The monthly magazine for members Amstat News is available online and features first-person statistician stories called My ASA Story. Based on the monthly column in AmStat News, the ASA produces a website called STATtr@k with new articles every month for early career statisticians and data analysts, recent graduates, or those who are in a statistics program. Quarterly magazine Chance and bimonthly magazine Significance are geared toward a general audience.

Historical publications include:

- Edward Jarvis, William Brigham and John Wingate Thornton, Memorial of the American Statistical Association Praying the Adoption of Measures for the Correction of Errors in the Census, 1844
- Publications of the American Statistical Association, 1888-1919 (Vols. 1-16) and Quarterly Publications of the American Statistical Association, 1920-1921

== Meetings ==
Meetings provide a platform for scholars and practitioners to exchange research, job opportunities and ideas with each other. ASA holds an annual meeting called Joint Statistical Meetings (JSM), a conference on statistical methodologies and applications called Spring Research Conference (SRC), Conference on Statistical Practice (CSP), and sponsors multiple international meetings and special-interest group meetings.

== See also ==
- American Statistical Association Founders Award
- American Mathematical Society
- COPSS Presidents' Award
- List of fellows of the American Statistical Association
- President of the American Statistical Association
- Statistics Without Borders (SWB)
