= Rafael Irizarry (scientist) =

American professor of biostatistics

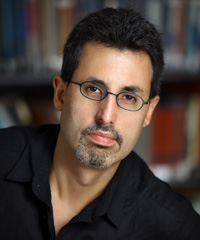
- Born: Rafael Angel Irizarry
- Education: University of Puerto Rico at Río Piedras (BS); University of California, Berkeley (MA, PhD)
- Known for: Bioconductor
- Awards: COPSS Presidents' Award (2009); Benjamin Franklin Award (2017); ISCB Fellow (2020)
- Scientific career
- Fields: Statistics; Biostatistics; Data science Genomics; Epigenetics
- Thesis: Statistics and Music: Fitting a Local Harmonic Model to Musical Sound Signals (1998)
- Doctoral advisor: David R. Brillinger
- Website: rafalab.org

Rafael Irizarry is a professor of biostatistics at the Harvard T.H. Chan School of Public Health and professor of biostatistics and computational biology at the Dana–Farber Cancer Institute. Irizarry is known as one of the founders of the Bioconductor project.

== Education ==
Irizarry gained his Bachelor of Science in mathematics from the University of Puerto Rico at Río Piedras in 1993, followed by a Master of Arts degree from the University of California, Berkeley in 1994. He continued his studies at Berkeley, gaining a PhD in statistics in 1998. His PhD thesis explored the use of statistics to model harmonies in sound signals and was supervised by David R. Brillinger.

== Research and career ==
Irizarry joined the Johns Hopkins Bloomberg School of Public Health in 1998, where his research focused on genomics and computational biology. He has worked on the analysis and processing of data arising from microarray experiments and helped develop the Robust Multiarray Analysis (RMA) method for microarray analysis in collaboration with statistician Terry Speed and colleagues; this method was later extended as the frozen RMA (fRMA) method. He has also worked on the analysis of next-generation sequencing data.

Irizarry is one of the founders of the Bioconductor project, an open-source and development software project for the analysis of genomic data in the R programming language. He has been involved in the development of several of the most used Bioconductor packages, including the 'affy' package for the analysis of Affymetrix microarray data.

Irizarry is the developer and instructor for the online Data Analysis for Life Sciences course on the Harvard University edX platform; this course enrolls over 30,000 students per year.

=== Awards and honors ===
2009 COPSS Presidents' Award in statistics.

2009 Mortimer Spiegelman Award from the American Public Health Association given to outstanding public health statisticians under the age of 40.

2017 Benjamin Franklin Award in Bioinformatics for his promotion of free and open-access materials and methods in the life sciences.

He was elected as a Fellow of the International Society for Computational Biology in 2020.
