= Statistics Without Borders =

- Founded: 2008
- Founder: Steve Pierson, Gary Shapiro, James J. Cochran, and Fritz Scheuren
- Region served: Worldwide
- Website: www.statisticswithoutborders.org

Statistics Without Borders (SWB) is an organization of volunteers that provide pro bono statistical consulting and assistance to organizations or governments to help deal with health issues. SWB is sponsored by the American Statistical Association. Their goal is to help international health initiatives and projects be delivered more effectively through better use of statistics. SWB was established by Steve Pierson, Gary Shapiro, James J. Cochran, and Fritz Scheuren

Some of the past and present projects include design and analysis about a survey about a public health intervention project in Sierra Leone, and another in Haiti, a survey of the economic impact of the 2010 Haiti earthquake, reviewing food security survey projects for the Food and Nutritional Technical Assistance II (FANTA-2) project at the Academy for Educational Development, and helping to prepare a proposal to survey households in Mexico about their use of bottled water.

== Projects ==
Selected Projects of Statistics Without Borders
Year	Partner	Location	Description
2018	Asante Africa Foundation	Kenya & Tanzania	Asante Africa Foundation works to empower East African youth with programs in Girls' Advancement, Accelerated Classroom Learning, and Youth Leadership and Entrepreneurship.; Monitoring and Evaluation (M&E) is essential to showing the impact of their work and planning future efforts.
2017 - 2027	Save the Children	Ethiopia	Save the Children is an international non-profit organization dedicated to improving the lives of children. Save the Children requested help from SWB to design an analysis plan for a longitudinal cohort study of nearly 2,000 children in Tigray, Ethiopia, as part of a long-term evaluation of Sponsorship-funded integrated programming.; Sponsorship-funded programming operates in the areas of maternal and child health, early childhood care and development, basic education, school health and nutrition, and adolescent development.; This valuation focuses on educational and early childhood interventions. Data will be collected every two years from 2017 and continuing through 2027.; Statistical challenges include analysis of missing data, definition of random effects and correlation structure, use of propensity scores, and causal inference.; SWB's team includes a graduate student and a medical school professor, both in the US, a post-doctoral fellow in Spain and a semi-retired academic researcher from Canada.
2018	Tacugama Chimpanzee Sanctuary	Sierra Leone	Since 1995, Tacugama Chimpanzee Sanctuary has rescued and rehabilitated nearly 200 orphaned and illegally traded western chimpanzees (Pan troglodytes verus). SWB did two projects for Tacugama in 2018.; In a fairly rapid 3-month project, one of our Masters-level statisticians analyzed before-and-after data from an environmental awareness campaign conducted by the conservation manager to reduce the negative impact of construction along the Bandajuma-Jendema road near the Liberian border.; McNemar's test was used to demonstrate the success of the campaign in improving awareness of the illegality of chimpanzee trading and risks associated with bushmeat consumption. GLMM models indicated that individuals who encounter bushmeat and/or use it as part of their daily lives may lack a corresponding awareness of the health risks, and be at highest risk for diseases such as Ebola.; SWB was asked to investigate the causes of an ataxia-like mystery disease responsible for the deaths of over 50 chimpanzees since 2005.; Tacugama veterinarians have long recognized important risk factors such as time of year and forested enclosure but were anxious to investigate further.; The SWB team included a medical school professor and a recent graduate in Industrial Engineering.; Project work continued for nearly a year while SWB volunteers explored the data with Cox survival analysis, competing risk plots, and CART models.; We also created an electronic database for the veterinarians, enabling them to record more types of data in a consistent and easily accessible form.
	UNICEF	Sierra Leone	SWB is working on a long-term project with UNICEF to evaluate health interventions in Sierra Leone.: SWB assisted with the design of the baseline survey, data cleaning, and survey weighting. Ongoing work will include data analysis and planning for a post-intervention survey.; An unsolicited comment from our main UNICEF contact follows: “… [your SWB volunteer] did an outstanding job. I could not have done it without her. She was so patient with cleaning the data and dealing with unexpected problems related to revisits. …”
	Syria Health Cluster	Syria	The Syrian Health Cluster, with four hubs and 118 partners, is the coordination mechanism to provide emergency and trauma care, as well as to provide basic health provision where it has collapsed.; The Syrian Health Cluster is a part of the "Whole-of-Syria" approach, which allows for a more effective and accountable humanitarian action inside Syria.; By request from Luis Hernando Aguilar of the Cluster at the time, a team of six SWB volunteers – from England, France, Kenya, the Netherlands, and the United States – spent one month completing and documenting an automatic data compilation system using ETL scripts in R to replace Excel macros.; The scripts helped optimize the ETL processes, reducing effort time, minimizing error risks, and improving the quality of the data that were the basis for decision making.
2012–2013	Haitian Earthquake Data	Haiti	A team of Statistics Without Borders (SWB) volunteers advised SciMetrika, LLC (an 8(a) firm that focuses on providing solutions to advancing human health) on the design and execution of a survey in Haiti.; Data collected will be used to assess the impact of the magnitude 7.0 Mw earthquake of 12 January 2010. The epicentre of this earthquake, near the town of Léogâne, was about 16 miles WSW of the Haitian capital and population center of Port-au-Prince. Thousands of people died and homes, businesses, government buildings, and national landmarks throughout the region collapsed or suffered structural damage, resulting in the displacement of millions of survivors.; In the aftermath of this (or any other) natural disaster, it is critical to quickly develop reliable estimates of the extent of damage to homes and displacement of people as well as the nature of the displacements (temporary or permanent, current living conditions of the displaced, etc.). It is on these issues that SciMetrika and SWB focused.
