= Francesco Guerra =

Italian mathematical physicist (1942–2025)

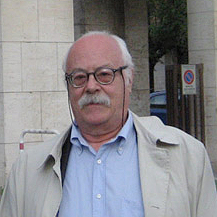
- Born: 10 November 1942; Naples, Italy
- Died: 19 June 2025 (aged 82); Rome, Italy
- Education: University of Naples
- Known for: Quantum field theory, spin glass
- Scientific career
- Fields: Mathematical physics
- Workplaces: Sapienza Università di Roma
- Doctoral students: Fabio Toninelli (2000–03)

Francesco Guerra (10 November 1942 – 19 June 2025) was an Italian mathematical physicist, whose main research contributions were in quantum field theory and spin glasses.

== Life and career ==
Guerra received his degree from the University of Naples in 1964. From 1976 to 1979 he was the director of the physics department of University of Salerno. He was Professor of Theoretical Physics at Sapienza Università di Roma since 1979. In 1983 and 1984, he served as Director of the Department of Mathematics, and from 1995 to 2001, he was Director of the Department of Physics.

Guerra was a plenary speaker at the European Congress of Mathematicians in 2004 and at the International Congress on Mathematical Physics in 2006.

Guerra died on 19 June 2025, at the age of 82.

== Research ==
Guerra was known for his work on quantum field theory and his deep and original contributions to the mathematical theory of spin glasses. With Fabio Toninelli, he proved the existence of the thermodynamic limit of the free energy in the Sherrington–Kirkpatrick model; his discovery of the broken replica symmetry bound lead to the proof of the Parisi formula; and the Ghirlanda-Guerra identities have been shown to explain the emergence of ultrametricity in spin glasses.

== Selected publications ==
- Francesco Guerra; Lon Rosen; Barry Simon (1975). "The P(φ)_{2} Euclidean quantum field theory as classical statistical mechanics". Annals of Mathematics, 101, 111–259.
- Stefano Ghirlanda; Francesco Guerra (1998). "General properties of overlap probability distributions in disordered spin systems. Towards Parisi ultrametricity". Journal of Physics A: Mathematical and General, 31, (46), 9149–9155.
- Francesco Guerra; Fabio Toninelli (2002). "The thermodynamic limit in mean field spin glass models". Communications in Mathematical Physics, 230, (1), 71–79.
- Francesco Guerra (2003). "Broken replica symmetry bounds in the mean field spin glass model". Communications in Mathematical Physics, 233, (1), 1–12.
- Francesco Guerra; Nadia Robotti (2008). Ettore Majorana: Aspects of his Scientific and Academic Activity. Springer. ISBN 978-88-7642-331-4.
- Francesco Guerra; Nadia Robotti (2017). The Lost Notebook of ENRICO FERMI: The True Story of the Discovery of Neutron-Induced Radioactivity. Springer. ISBN 978-3-319-69254-8.

== Bibliography ==
- Giuseppe Genovese (January 2026). "In memory of Francesco Guerra (1942-2025)" (PDF). IAMP Bulletin: 4–6.

== Documentary ==
- "Nessuno mi troverà" — a 2015 documentary directed by Egidio Eronico.
