= Fabio Toninelli =

Italian mathematician

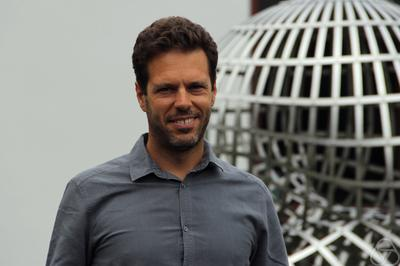
- Fabio Toninelli, Oberwolfach 2015
- Born: 1975 (age 50–51)
- Education: Sapienza; Scuola Normale Superiore di Pisa
- Awards: CNRS bronze medal (2007)
- Scientific career
- Fields: Mathematics, Physics
- Workplaces: TU Eindhoven; University of Zurich; ENS Lyon; CNRS; University of Lyon; TU Wien
- Doctoral advisor: Francesco Guerra
- Doctoral students: Quentin Berger (2009-12); Benoit Laslier (2011-14); Niccolo Torri (2012-15, jointly with Francesco Caravenna); Vincent Lerouvilois (2017-2020); Anatole Ertul (2018-2021, jointly with Oriane Blondel); Levi Haunschmid (2020-2024)

Fabio Toninelli (born 1975) is an Italian mathematician who works in probability theory, stochastic processes and probabilistic aspects of mathematical physics.

== Education ==
He obtained his PhD in physics, in 2003, from Scuola Normale Superiore di Pisa.

== Career ==
Between 2004 and 2020 he was senior researcher at Centre National de la Recherche Scientifique (CNRS) in Lyon. Since 2020 he has been Professor of Mathematics at Technische Universität Wien.

In 2021–2024 he was co-editor-in-chief (jointly with Bálint Tóth) of the journal Probability Theory and Related Fields.

== Research ==
Toninelli has contributed substantially to the mathematical theory of disordered statistical mechanical systems, mixing of Markov chains, dimer models. His most significant contributions concern the theory of mean-field spin glasses, of polymers in random environments and of stochastic interface dynamics.

== Recognition ==
Toninelli was an invited speaker of the International Congress of Mathematicians ICM-2018 (Rio de Janeiro), an invited plenary speaker of the 9th European Congress of Mathematics (Sevilla, 2024, https://www.ecm2024sevilla.com/), an invited plenary speaker of the International Congress on Mathematical Physics ICMP-2018 (Montreal), and an invited plenary speaker of the Conference on Stochastic Processes and their Applications SPA-2014 (Buenos Aires).
