= Edward C. Waymire =

Edward Waymire
- Scientific career
- Fields: Mathematics
- Workplaces: Oregon State University

Edward C. Waymire is an American mathematician, and professor of mathematics at Oregon State University. He was the chief editor of the Annals of Applied Probability between 2006 and 2008. From 2011 to 2013, he was president of the Bernoulli Society for Mathematical Statistics and Probability. He is the recipient of the 2014 Carver Medal from the Institute of Mathematical Statistics.

== Books ==
- Bhattacharya, R., E. Waymire (2007): A Basic Course in Probability Theory, Universitext, Springer, NY.
- Bhattacharya, R., E. Waymire (2009): Stochastic Processes with Applications, SIAM Classics in Applied Mathematics Series.
