= Chance (magazine) =

- Cover of the September 2016 issue
- Editor: Scott Evans
- Frequency: Quarterly
- Publisher: American Statistical Association and Taylor & Francis Group
- Founded: 1988
- Country: United States
- Website: chance.amstat.org
- ISSN: 0933-2480
- OCLC: 888951470

Chance is a quarterly non-technical statistics magazine published jointly by the American Statistical Association and Taylor & Francis Group. It was established in 1988, and Taylor & Francis has published it since 2012. The magazine sponsors the blog "The Statistics Forum", which allows anyone to post their thoughts on probability and statistics.
