= Electronic Communications in Probability =

- Discipline: Probability theory
- Language: English
- Edited by: Patrícia Gonçalves

Publication details
- History: 1995–present
- Publisher: Institute of Mathematical Statistics and the Bernoulli Society
- Open access: Yes
- License: Creative Commons Attribution 3.0
- Impact factor: 0.606 (2019)

Standard abbreviations
- ISO 4: Electron. Commun. Probab.

Indexing
- ISSN: 1083-589X
- LCCN: sn95005821
- OCLC no.: 605072778

Links
- Journal homepage; Online access; Online archive

The Electronic Communications in Probability is a peer-reviewed open access scientific journal published by the Institute of Mathematical Statistics and the Bernoulli Society. The editor-in-chief is Patrícia Gonçalves. It contains short articles covering probability theory, whereas its sister journal, the Electronic Journal of Probability, publishes full-length papers and shares the same editorial board, but with a different editor-in-chief.
