= Beurling algebra =

In mathematics, the term Beurling algebra is used for various different algebras introduced by Arne Beurling (1949). Usually it is an algebra of periodic functions with Fourier series

$$f(x) = \sum a_n e^{inx}$$

Example We may consider the algebra of those functions f where the majorants

$$c_k = \sup_{|n| \ge k} |a_n|$$

of the Fourier coefficients a_{n} are summable. In other words

$$\sum_{k \ge 0} c_k < \infty.$$

Example We may consider a weight function w on $\mathbb{Z}$ such that

$$w(m+n) \leq w(m)w(n),\quad w(0)=1,$$

in which case $A_w(\mathbb{T}) = \{f : f(t) = \sum_n a_n e^{int},\,\|f\|_w = \sum_n|a_n|w(n) < \infty\} \,(\sim\ell^1_w(\mathbb{Z}))$ is a unitary commutative Banach algebra.

These algebras are closely related to the Wiener algebra.
