= Theory of Probability and Mathematical Statistics =

- Discipline: Probability theory, statistics
- Language: English

Publication details
- History: 1970–present
- Publisher: Taras Shevchenko National University of Kyiv and American Mathematical Society
- Frequency: Biannually

Standard abbreviations
- ISO 4: Theory Probab. Math. Stat.
- MathSciNet: Theory Probab. Math. Statist.

Indexing
- CODEN: TPMSCO
- ISSN: 0094-9000 (print); 1547-7363 (web)
- LCCN: 74646889
- OCLC no.: 57228483

Links
- Journal homepage; Journal at AMS website

Theory of Probability and Mathematical Statistics is a peer-reviewed international scientific journal published by Taras Shevchenko National University of Kyiv jointly with the American Mathematical Society two times per year in both print and electronic formats. The subjects covered by the journal are probability theory, mathematical statistics, random processes and fields, statistics of random processes and fields, random operators, stochastic differential equations, stochastic analysis, queuing theory, reliability theory, risk processes, financial and actuarial mathematics. The editor-in-chief is Yuliya Mishura (Ukraine).

== Abstracting and indexing ==
The journal is abstracted and indexed in the Emerging Sources Citation Index, Mathematical Reviews, Scopus, and Zentralblatt MATH.

== Editorial Board ==
- Yu. Mishura (Editor-in-Chief) (Ukraine)
- M. Leonenko (Deputy Editor-in-Chief) (United Kingdom)
- K. Ralchenko (Managing Editor) (Ukraine)
- V. Anisimov (United Kingdom), A. Ayache (France), T. Bodnar (Sweden), K. Bogdan (Poland), D. Finkelshtein (United Kingdom), M. Grothaus (Germany), A. Iksanov (Ukraine), A. Ivanov (Ukraine), A. Kulik (Poland), R. Maiboroda (Ukraine), A. Marynych (Ukraine), L. Mattner (Germany), I. Molchanov (Switzerland), O. Okhrin (Germany), A. Olenko (Australia), E. Orsingher (Italy), F. Polito (Italy), V. Radchenko (Ukraine), G. Shevchenko (Ukraine), D. Silvestrov (Sweden), T. Sottinen (Finland), A. Swishchuk (Canada), A. Volodin (Canada)
