= Probability Theory and Related Fields =

- Discipline: Probability
- Language: English
- Edited by: Fabio Toninelli, Bálint Tóth

Publication details
- Former name: Zeitschrift für Wahrscheinlichkeitstheorie und verwandte Gebiete
- History: 1962–present
- Publisher: Springer
- Frequency: Monthly
- Impact factor: 2.125 (2019)

Standard abbreviations
- ISO 4: Probab. Theory Relat. Fields
- MathSciNet: Probab. Theory Related Fields

Indexing
- CODEN: PTRFEU
- ISSN: 0178-8051 (print); 1432-2064 (web)
- LCCN: 86650503

Links
- Journal homepage

Probability Theory and Related Fields is a peer-reviewed mathematics journal published by Springer. Established in 1962, it was originally named Zeitschrift für Wahrscheinlichkeitstheorie und verwandte Gebiete, with the English replacing the German starting from volume 71 (1986). The journal publishes articles on probability. The journal is indexed by Mathematical Reviews and Zentralblatt MATH. Its 2019 MCQ was 2.29, and its 2019 impact factor was 2.125.

The current editors-in-chief are Fabio Toninelli (Technical University of Vienna) and Bálint Tóth (University of Bristol and Alfréd Rényi Institute of Mathematics).

The journal CiteScore is 3.8 and its SCImago Journal Rank is 3.198, both from 2020. It is currently ranked 11th in the field of Probability & Statistics with Applications according to Google Scholar.

== Past Editors-in-chief ==
- 1961–1971: Leopold Schmetterer (Vienna)
- 1971–1985: Klaus Krickeberg (Bielefeld)
- 1985–1991: Hermann Rost (Heidelberg)
- 1991–1994: Olav Kallenberg (Auburn AL)
- 1994–2000: Erwin Bolthausen (Zurich)
- 2000–2005: Geoffrey Grimmett (Cambridge)
- 2005–2010: Jean-François Le Gall (Paris) and Jean Bertoin (Paris)
- 2010–2015: Gérard Ben Arous (New York) and Amir Dembo (Stanford)
- 2015–2020: Michel Ledoux (Toulouse) and Fabio Martinelli (Rome)
- 2021–2024: Fabio Toninelli (Vienna) and Bálint Tóth (Budapest and Bristol)
