= Nadia Robotti =

Italian historian of physics

Nadia Robotti is an Italian historian of physics specializing in Italian physics from the mid-19th century to the mid-20th century, including the works of Enrico Fermi, Ettore Majorana, and Bruno Pontecorvo. She is a professor of physics at the University of Genoa and an external project leader at the Museo storico della fisica e Centro di studi e ricerche "Enrico Fermi".

== Books ==
Robotti's books include:

- Fisica, meteorologia e sismologia nell'Ottocento. Il contributo del Seminario Vescovile di Chiavari (with Alessandro Paoletti, University of Genoa, 2000)
- Ettore Majorana: Aspects of His Scientific and Academic Activity (with Francesco Guerra, Scuola Normale Superiore, 2008)
- The Lost Notebook of Enrico Fermi: The True Story of the Discovery of Neutron-Induced Radioactivity (with Francesco Guerra, Springer, 2018, translated from a 2015 Italian edition by Christine V. Pennison).

== Recognition ==
In 2008, the Italian Physical Society gave Robotti their prize in history of physics for her work on Majorana. She was the recipient of the 2017 International Prize "Le Muse" for history, the first winner to work in the history of science.

She was elected as a corresponding member of the International Academy of the History of Science in 2007, and as a full member in 2019.
