= Andrew C. Berry =

American mathematician (1906–1998)

Andrew Campbell Berry (November 23, 1906 – January 13, 1998) was an American mathematician. The Berry–Esseen theorem is named after him.

Berry was born in Somerville, Massachusetts, US on November 23, 1906. He spent eight years (1921–1929) at Harvard University, receiving his A.B. degree in 1925, A.M. degree in 1926, and a Ph.D. in 1929. After two years at Brown University and Princeton University on a National Research Fellowship, he joined the faculty of Columbia University in 1931, where he was assistant professor from 1935 to 1941. In 1941, he joined Lawrence University as associate professor.

In 1944, during World War II, the university "loaned" him to the 5th and 13th Air Forces in the Pacific War. There he worked as an operations analyst, including "development of an improved gunsight for waist-gunners on B-24 aircraft". He received the Medal of Freedom in 1946 for his actions during the Battle of Guadalcanal.

Berry died in Appleton, Wisconsin on January 13, 1998.
