= Rebecca Andridge =

American statistician

Rebecca Roberts Andridge is an American statistician. Her statistical research concerns the imputation of missing data and the statistics of group-randomized trials; she has also performed highly-cited applied statistical work on omega-3 nutritional supplements and on the health benefits of using yoga to lower stress. Andridge is a professor of biostatistics at the Ohio State University.

== Education and career ==
Andridge majored in economics at Stanford University, graduating in 1999. She went to the University of Michigan for graduate study, earning a master's degree in 2005 and completing her Ph.D. in biostatistics in 2009. Her dissertation, Statistical Methods for Missing Data in Complex Sample Surveys, was supervised by Roderick J. A. Little.

In 2009, after completing her Ph.D., she joined the Ohio State University College of Public Health as an assistant professor of biostatistics. She was tenured as an associate professor in 2016. At Ohio State, she also holds affiliations with the Institute for Population Research, Food Innovation Center, and Decision Sciences Collaborative.

== Recognition ==
Andridge was elected as a Fellow of the American Statistical Association in 2020.
