= Kazimierz Urbanik =

Polish mathematician (1930–2005)

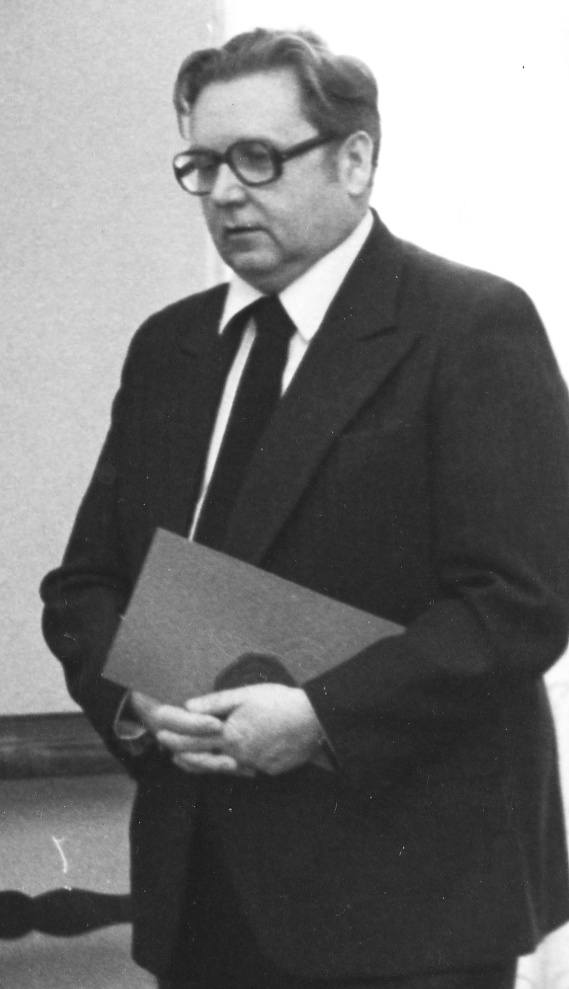
- Urbanik in 1981
- Born: 5 February 1930; Krzemieniec, Poland
- Died: 29 May 2005 (aged 75); Wrocław, Poland
- Education: Wrocław University
- Known for: Probability Theory
- Awards: Gold Cross of Merit Commander's Cross with Star Medal of the National Education Commission Order of the Banner of Work Officer Order of Leopold II Knight (Chevalier) of Ordre des Palmes académiques
- Scientific career
- Fields: Mathematics
- Workplaces: Wrocław University
- Doctoral advisor: Edward Marczewski

Kazimierz Urbanik (February 5, 1930 – May 29, 2005) was a Polish mathematician and prominent member of the Polish School of Mathematics. He founded the journal Probability and Mathematical Statistics and served as rector of the University of Wrocław.

== Early life and education ==
Urbanik was born in Krzemieniec and studied at the lyceum there. During World War II the town came under Soviet control, and was annexed by Ukraine; after the war, Urbanik's family moved to Brzeg, which remained Polish. Beginning in 1948, Urbanik studied mathematics and physics at the University of Wrocław, where he was mentored by Hugo Steinhaus and Edward Marczewski. He completed a degree in 1952, and began teaching at the university while continuing his studies under Marczewski, researching general topology, measure theory, and probability theory. He completed his doctorate in 1956, and his habilitation in 1957.

== Academic career ==
Urbanik began teaching at the University of Wrocław in 1956. By 1960, he was promoted to professor, and in 1965 he became a member of the Polish Academy of Sciences, becoming its youngest member. He was an invited speaker at the International Congress of Mathematicians in 1966. He directed the university's Institute of Mathematics for most of the years from 1967 to 1996, and was rector of the university from 1975 to 1981. In 1980, he founded the journal Probability and Mathematical Statistics, and became its first editor-in-chief. In 1993, Urbanik became the recipient of the Sierpiński Medal conferred jointly by the Polish Mathematical Society and the University of Warsaw.

== Contributions ==
His research contributions include over 180 papers. His work in probability theory included work on random variables in compact groups, connections between measurability and connectivity, generalized convolutions, and decomposability semigroups. He also studied stochastic processes, information theory, universal algebra, and functional analysis. He was the doctoral advisor of 17 students.
