= Modern Stochastics: Theory and Applications =

Mathematics journal

- Discipline: Probability theory, statistics
- Language: English
- Edited by: Kestutis Kubilius, Yuliya Mishura

Publication details
- History: 2014–present
- Publisher: VTeX, Vilnius University, and Taras Shevchenko National University of Kyiv
- Frequency: Quarterly
- Open access: Yes
- License: Creative Commons Attribution 3.0

Standard abbreviations
- ISO 4: Mod. Stoch.: Theory Appl.

Indexing
- ISSN: 2351-6046 (print); 2351-6054 (web)
- OCLC no.: 1078170985

Links
- Journal homepage

Modern Stochastics: Theory and Applications is a quarterly peer-reviewed open-access mathematics journal that was established in 2014. It is published cooperatively by Vilnius University (Lithuania), Taras Shevchenko National University of Kyiv (Ukraine), and VTeX (Lithuania). The editors-in-chief are Kestutis Kubilius (Vilnius University) and Yuliya Mishura (Taras Shevchenko National University of Kyiv). The journal covers all aspects of stochastics.

== Focus and scope ==
The journal publishes original research papers in:

- probability theory
- mathematical statistics
- theory of stochastic processes and random fields
- stochastic analysis and stochastic differential equations;
- probabilistic aspects of fractal analysis
- stochastic geometry
- financial mathematics
- actuarial mathematics and risk theory
- applications in economics, biology, physics, engineering
- optimization and control

== Abstracting and indexing ==
The journal is abstracted and indexed in:

- Current Index to Statistics
- Emerging Sources Citation Index
- MathSciNet
- Scopus
- Zentralblatt MATH
