= Electronic Journal of Probability =

- Discipline: Probability theory
- Language: English
- Edited by: Cristina Toninelli

Publication details
- History: 1995–present
- Publisher: Institute of Mathematical Statistics and the Bernoulli Society
- Open access: Yes
- License: Creative Commons Attribution 3.0
- Impact factor: 1.123 (2019)

Standard abbreviations
- ISO 4: Electron. J. Probab.

Indexing
- ISSN: 1083-6489
- LCCN: sn95005820
- OCLC no.: 32852135

Links
- Journal homepage; Online access; Online archive

The Electronic Journal of Probability is a peer-reviewed open access scientific journal published by the Institute of Mathematical Statistics and the Bernoulli Society. It covers all aspects of probability theory and the current editor-in-chief is Cristina Toninelli. Electronic Communications in Probability is a sister journal that publishes short papers. The two journals share the same editorial board, but have different editors-in-chiefs, each chosen for a three-year period. According to the Journal Citation Reports, the Electronic Journal of Probability has a 2016 impact factor of 0.904.

== Recent editors-in-chief ==
- Cristina Toninelli (2024-2026)
- Bénédicte Hass (2021-2023)
- Andreas Kyprianou (2018-2020)
- Brian Rider (2015-2017)
- Michel Ledoux (2012-2014)
- Bálint Tóth (2009-2011)
- Andreas Greven (2005-2008)
- J Theodore Cox (2002-2004)
- Richard Bass (1999-2002)
- Krzysztof Burdzy and Gregory Lawler (1995-1999)
