= Electronic Journal of Statistics =

- Discipline: Statistics
- Language: English
- Edited by: Alexandra Carpentier and Arnak Dalalyan (2025–2027)

Publication details
- History: 2007–present
- Publisher: Institute of Mathematical Statistics and the Bernoulli Society
- Frequency: Upon acceptation
- Open access: Yes
- License: Creative Commons Attribution
- Impact factor: 1.529 (2017)

Standard abbreviations
- ISO 4: Electron. J. Stat.

Indexing
- ISSN: 1935-7524
- LCCN: 2007214848
- OCLC no.: 82214859

Links
- Journal homepage; Online access; Online archive

The Electronic Journal of Statistics is an open access peer-reviewed scientific journal published by the Institute of Mathematical Statistics and the Bernoulli Society. It covers all aspects of statistics (theoretical, computational, and applied); the previous editor-in-chief were Larry Wasserman (2007–2009), David Ruppert (2010–2012), George Michailidis (2013–2015), Domenico Marinucci (2016–2021), Gang Li and Grace Yi (2022–2024). According to the Journal Citation Reports, the journal has a 2013 impact factor of 1.024. By 2017, the impact factor was recorded as 1.529.
