= Applied probability =

Application of probability theory

Applied probability is the application of probability theory to statistical problems and other scientific and engineering domains.

== Scope ==
Much research involving probability is done under the auspices of applied probability. However, while such research is motivated (to some degree) by applied problems, it is usually the mathematical aspects of the problems that are of most interest to researchers (as is typical of applied mathematics in general).

Applied probabilists are particularly concerned with the application of stochastic processes, and probability more generally, to the natural, applied and social sciences, including biology, physics (including astronomy), chemistry, medicine, computer science and information technology, and economics.

Another area of interest is in engineering: particularly in areas of uncertainty, risk management, probabilistic design, and Quality assurance.

== History ==
Having initially been defined at a symposium of the American Mathematical Society in the later 1950s, the term "applied probability" was popularized by Maurice Bartlett through the name of a Methuen monograph series he edited, Applied Probability and Statistics. The area did not have an established outlet until 1964, when the Journal of Applied Probability came into existence through the efforts of Joe Gani.

== See also ==
- Areas of application:
  - Ruin theory
  - Statistical physics
  - Stoichiometry and modelling chemical reactions
  - Ecology, particularly population modelling
  - Evolutionary biology
  - Optimization in computer science
  - Telecommunications
  - Reliability engineering
  - Quality control
  - Options pricing in economics
  - Ewens's sampling formula in population genetics
  - Operations research
  - Gaming mathematics
- Stochastic processes:
  - Markov chain
  - Poisson process
  - Brownian motion and other diffusion processes
  - Queueing theory
  - Renewal theory
- Additional information and resources
  - Applied Probability Trust
  - INFORMS Institute for Operations Research and the Management Sciences
