= Jozef Teugels =

Belgian statistician and actuary (born 1939)

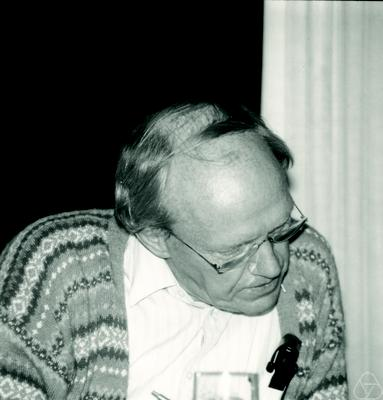
Image of Jef Teugels

Jozef Lodewijk Maria Teugels, or Jozef L. Teugels, Jef Teugels (born February 20, 1939) is a Belgian mathematical statistician and actuary. His main contributions are in extreme value theory, stochastic processes, and reinsurance theory.

== Education and career ==
Teugels was born in Londerzeel, Belgium and studied at the Catholic University of Louvain, where he received his licentiate in mathematics in 1963. He moved to the US to pursue further study and obtained his MSc in 1966 and PhD in 1967, both at Purdue University, where he was supervised by Marcel F. Neuts. He returned to Belgium in the same year and took up a faculty position at KU Leuven, where he was promoted to full professorship in 1973. He remained in Louvain until his retirement in 2004. During this period, Teugels was the chair of the Department of Mathematics from 1970 to 1977 and from 1982 to 1989.

Teugels was named a distinguished alumnus of Purdue University in 2004. He was president of the International Statistical Institute between 2009 and 2011.

== Bibliography ==
- Bingham, N. H.; Goldie, C. M.; Teugels, J. L. (1987). Regular Variation (1 ed.). Cambridge University Press. doi:10.1017/cbo9780511721434. ISBN 978-0-521-30787-1.
- Beirlant, Jan; Teugels, Jozef L.; Vynckier, Petra (1996). Practical analysis of extreme values. Leuven, Belgium: Leuven University Press. ISBN 90-6186-768-1. OCLC 36890147.
- Beirlant, Jan; Goegebeur, Yuri; Segers, Johan; Teugels, Jozef L. (2004). Statistics of extremes : theory and applications. Chichester, England: Wiley. ISBN 978-0-470-01237-6. OCLC 85820811.
- Teugels, Jef L.; Sundt, Bjørn, eds. (2004). Encyclopedia of actuarial science. Hoboken, NJ: Wiley. ISBN 0-470-84676-3. OCLC 55845505.
- Albrecher, Hansjörg; Beirlant, Jan; Teugels, Jozef L. (2008). Reinsurance : Actuarial and Statistical Aspects. Hoboken: John Wiley & Sons, Incorporated. ISBN 978-1-119-41993-8. OCLC 1003266191.
- Rolski, Tomasz; Schmidli, Hanspeter; Schmidt, V.; Teugels, Jozef L. (2009). Stochastic processes for insurance and finance. Chicester: Wiley. ISBN 9786612307928. OCLC 1303448068.
