= Stochastic Models =

- Discipline: Stochastic models
- Language: English
- Edited by: Mark S. Squillante

Publication details
- Former name: Communications in Statistics. Stochastic Models
- History: 1985-present
- Publisher: Taylor & Francis
- Frequency: Quarterly
- Impact factor: 0.536 (2018)

Standard abbreviations
- ISO 4: Stoch. Models

Indexing
- CODEN: SMTOBE
- ISSN: 1532-6349 (print); 1532-4214 (web)
- LCCN: 00212884
- OCLC no.: 48483352

Links
- Journal homepage; Online access; Online archive

Stochastic Models is a peer-reviewed scientific journal that publishes papers on stochastic models. It is published by Taylor & Francis. It was established in 1985 under the title Communications in Statistics. Stochastic Models and obtained its current name in 2001. According to the Journal Citation Reports, the journal has a 2018 impact factor of 0.536. The founding editor-in-chief was Marcel F. Neuts, the current editor is Mark S. Squillante (IBM Thomas J. Watson Research Center).
