= The Annals of Applied Statistics =

- Discipline: Applied statistics
- Language: English
- Edited by: Karen Kafadar

Publication details
- History: 2007–present
- Publisher: Institute of Mathematical Statistics (United States)
- Impact factor: 1.8 (2022)

Standard abbreviations
- ISO 4: Ann. Appl. Stat.

Indexing
- ISSN: 1932-6157
- LCCN: 2006214512
- OCLC no.: 70663234

Links
- Journal homepage; Project Euclid

The Annals of Applied Statistics is a peer-reviewed scientific journal published by the Institute of Mathematical Statistics, covering all areas of statistics, featuring papers in the applied half of this range. It was established in 2007, with Bradley Efron as founding editor-in-chief. According to the Journal Citation Reports, the journal has a 2022 impact factor of 1.8.
