= Annals of Applied Probability =

The Annals of Applied Probability
- Discipline: Probability
- Language: English
- Edited by: Jian Ding and Claudio Landim

Publication details
- History: 1991–present
- Publisher: Institute of Mathematical Statistics
- Frequency: Bimonthly
- Impact factor: 1.8 (2024)

Standard abbreviations
- ISO 4: Ann. Appl. Probab.

Indexing
- ISSN: 1050-5164
- LCCN: 91650942

Links
- Journal homepage; Online access

The Annals of Applied Probability is a peer-reviewed mathematics journal published by the Institute of Mathematical Statistics. The journal was established in 1991 with J. Michael Steele as founding editor-in-chief. It is indexed by Mathematical Reviews, Zentralblatt MATH, and the Science Citation Index Expanded. According to the Journal Citation Reports, the journal has a 2024 impact factor of 1.8.
