= Cristina Toninelli =

Italian mathematician

Cristina Toninelli is an Italian mathematician who works in France as a director of research for the French National Centre for Scientific Research (CNRS), at the Centre de recherche en mathématiques de la décision (Ceremade) of Paris Dauphine University. Her research concerns the probability theory and statistical mechanics of phase transitions in interacting particle systems, including bootstrap percolation, glass transitions, and jamming. She has also studied cellular automata and group testing.

== Education and career ==
Toninelli studied physics at Sapienza University of Rome, earning a laurea in 2000 and completing a Ph.D. in 2004. Her doctoral dissertation, Kinetically constrained models for glassy dynamics, was supervised by Giovanni Jona-Lasinio.

She became a postdoctoral researcher in the laboratory for theoretical physics (LPT) at the École normale supérieure (Paris) from 2003 to 2005 and then for shorter periods at Service de Physique Théorique in CEA Paris-Saclay and at the Laboratory of Theoretical Physics and Statistical Models in Paris-Saclay University, also visiting the Instituto Nacional de Matemática Pura e Aplicada in Brazil. In 2006 she began working as a researcher for the CNRS. She has been a director of research since 2018.

== Recognition ==
The Société mathématique de France gave Toninelli the 2021 Marc Yor Prize, citing her work on the relaxation towards equilibrium of interacting particle systems.

She was a 2026 recipient of the CNRS Silver Medal.
