= Probability Surveys =

- Discipline: Mathematics
- Language: English
- Edited by: Adam Jakubowski

Publication details
- History: begun 2002
- Publisher: Bernoulli Society, Institute of Mathematical Statistics (The Netherlands, USA)
- Open access: yes

Standard abbreviations
- ISO 4: Probab. Surv.

Indexing
- ISSN: 1549-5787

Links
- Journal homepage; Institute of Mathematical Statistics, editorial page

Probability Surveys is an open-access electronic journal that is jointly sponsored by the Bernoulli Society and the Institute of Mathematical Statistics. It publishes review articles on topics of interest in probability theory.

== Managing Editors ==
- David Aldous (2004–2008)
- Geoffrey Grimmett (2009–2011)
- Laurent Saloff-Coste (2012–2014)
- Ben Hambly (2015–2020)
- Mikhail A. Lifshits (2021–2023)
- Adam Jakubowski (2024–2026)
- Takashi Kumagai (2027–2029)
