= Bernoulli Society for Mathematical Statistics and Probability =

International mathematical Association

- Formation: 1975
- Type: Learned society
- Members: 1000
- Official language: English
- President: Nancy Reid
- Website: www.bernoullisociety.org

The Bernoulli Society is a professional association that aims to further the progress of probability and mathematical statistics, founded as part of the International Statistical Institute in 1975. It is named after the Bernoulli family of mathematicians and scientists, whose researchers covered "most areas of scientific knowledge".

The society publishes two journals, Bernoulli and Stochastic Processes and their Applications, and a newsletter, Bernoulli News. Additionally, it co-sponsors several other journals including Electronic Communications in Probability, Electronic Journal of Probability, Electronic Journal of Statistics, Probability Surveys, and Statistics Surveys.

== Presidents of the Bernoulli Society ==
A list of the presidents of the society from its foundation to the current day.

- 1975 David George Kendall
- 1975 David Blackwell
- 1977 Klaus Krickeberg
- 1979 David Cox
- 1981 Pál Révész
- 1983 Elizabeth Scott
- 1985 Chris Heyde
- 1987 Willem van Zwet
- 1989 Albert Shiryaev
- 1991 Peter J. Bickel
- 1993 Ole Barndorff-Nielsen
- 1995 Jozef Teugels
- 1997 Louis Chen
- 1999 David Siegmund
- 2001 Peter G. Hall
- 2003 Donald A. Dawson
- 2005 Peter Jagers
- 2007 Jean Jacod
- 2009 Victor Perez-Abreu
- 2011 Edward C. Waymire
- 2013 Wilfrid Kendall
- 2015 Sara van de Geer
- 2017 Susan Murphy
- 2019 Claudia Klüppelberg
- 2021 Adam Jakubowski
- 2023 Victor Panaretos
- 2025 Nancy Reid
- 2027 Maria Eulália Vares
