= Applied Probability Trust =

Not-for-profit foundation for study and research in the mathematical sciences

- Parent institution: University of Sheffield
- Founder: Joseph Mark (Joe) Gani
- Established: 1964
- Focus: Applied probability research
- Chair: Remco van der Hofstad
- Key people: Mark Stevens, Executive Editor
- Address: Hicks Building, K27 Hounsfield Road Sheffield S3 7RH
- Location: United Kingdom
- Website: http://www.appliedprobability.org

The Applied Probability Trust is a UK-based non-profit foundation for study and research in the mathematical sciences, founded in 1964 and based in the School of Mathematics and Statistics at the University of Sheffield, which it has been affiliated with since 1964.

== Publications ==
The Applied Probability Trust (APT) published two world leading research journals, the Journal of Applied Probability and Advances in Applied Probability, until 2016. Joe Gani, founding editor for the two journals, intended to create outlets for researchers in applied probability, as they increasingly had difficulty in getting published in the few journals in probability and statistics that existed at that time. The Journal of Applied Probability appeared first, in 1964, and with a prominent editorial board from the beginning, it secured contributions from renowned probabilists. The Advances in Applied Probability started in 1969. In 2016, Cambridge University Press took over the publication of the two journals.

In addition to these two journals, two further magazine style publications have been published, The Mathematical Scientist and Mathematical Spectrum.

- Journal of Applied Probability (since 1964)
- Advances in Applied Probability (since 1972)
- The Mathematical Scientist (1976 – 2018)
- Mathematical Spectrum (1968 – 2016)

To mark special occasions, the Applied Probability Trust commissions special issues of the journal. These include:

- Perspectives in Probability and Statistics (1975)
- Essays in Statistical Science (1982)
- Essays in Time Series and Allied Processes (1986)
- A Celebration of Applied Probability (1988)
- Studies in Applied Probability (1994)
- Probability, Statistics and Seismology (2001)
- Stochastic Methods and Their Applications (2004)
- New Frontiers in Applied Probability (2011)
- Celebrating 50 Years of the Applied Probability Trust (2014)
- Probability, Analysis and Number Theory (2016)
- Branching and Applied Probability (2018)

== Board of Trustees, Past and Present ==
The Applied Probability Trust was set up by Joe Gani in 1964 along with Norma McArthur, Edward Hannan and support from the London Mathematical Society. Over the history of the APT, many world renowned probabilists have accepted the invitation to join the APT board of trustees. A complete list of trustees, past and present can be found below:

- Joe Gani (1964 – 2016)
- Norma McArthur (1964 – 1984)
- Edward J. Hannan (1964 – 1994)
- London Mathematical Society (1964 – 2008)
- Chris Heyde (1984 – 2008)
- Daryl Daley (1997 – 2023)
- Søren Asmussen (2008 – 2020)
- Peter Taylor, University of Melbourne (since 2008)
- Frank Kelly (2008 – 2021)
- Peter Glynn, Stanford University (since 2014)
- Ilya Molchanov, University of Bern (since 2019)
- Jiangang (Jim) Dai, Cornell University (since 2019)
- Remco van der Hofstad, Eindhoven University of Technology (since 2019)
- Christina Goldschmidt, Oxford University (since 2021)
- Nigel Bean, University of Adelaide (since 2021)
- Nicole Bäuerle, Karlsruhe Institute of Technology (since 2026)

== Past and Current Editors ==
- Joe Gani, Founding Editor-in-Chief (1964 – 1989)
- Chris Heyde, Editor-in-Chief (1990 – 2007)
- Søren Asmussen, Editor-in-Chief (2005 – 2015)
- Peter Glynn, Editor-in-Chief (2016 – 2018)
- Peter Taylor, Editor-in-Chief (since 2019)
- Nicole Bäuerle, Deputy Editor-in-Chief (since 2022)

The APT board of trustees decided who holds the position of Editor-in-Chief.

== Applied Probability Trust Prizes ==
The Applied Probability Trust as a long history of donating funds to institutions around the world to support the awarding of prizes. The form a prize takes is at the discretion of the host institution, however the award title often comes with small cash sum or funds to purchase books. Current prizes include:

- Australian National University: Applied Probability Trust Prize
- CWI, Amsterdam: Applied Probability Trust Prize
- Imperial College, London: Hyman Levy Prize
- The Open University: George Barnard Prize
- University of Adelaide: Applied Probability Trust Prize
- University of California, Santa Barbara: Abraham Wald Prize and Ruth and Joe Gani Prize
- University of Cambridge: Bartlett Prize and Rollo Davidson Trust
- University of Kentucky: R. L. Anderson Prize
- Université Libre de Bruxelles: Ruth and Joe Gani prize
- University of Manchester: M. S. Bartlett Prize
- University of Melbourne: Norma McArthur Prize
- University of Newcastle, New South Wales: Applied Probability Trust Statistics Prize
- University of Sheffield: Sir Edward Collingwood Prize
- University of Sydney: Applied Probability Trust Prize
- University of Waterloo: George Barnard Prize
- University of Western Australia: Richard Tweedie Memorial Applied Probability Trust Prize and Abraham Wald Prize
- University of Wollongong: William Sealy Gosset Prize and Applied Probability Trust Prize
