= Stochastic Processes and Their Applications =

- Discipline: Statistics
- Language: English
- Edited by: Eva Löcherbach

Publication details
- History: 1973–present
- Publisher: Elsevier
- Frequency: Monthly
- Impact factor: 1.467 (2020)

Standard abbreviations
- ISO 4: Stoch. Process. Their Appl.
- MathSciNet: Stochastic Process. Appl.

Indexing
- CODEN: STOPB7
- ISSN: 0304-4149 (print); 1879-209X (web)
- OCLC no.: 1789401

Links
- Journal homepage; Online access

Stochastic Processes and Their Applications is a monthly peer-reviewed scientific journal published by Elsevier for the Bernoulli Society for Mathematical Statistics and Probability. The editor-in-chief is Eva Löcherbach. The principal focus of this journal is theory and applications of stochastic processes. It was established in 1973.

== Abstracting and indexing ==
The journal is abstracted and indexed in:

- Cambridge Scientific Abstracts
- Compendex
- Current Contents
- Current Index to Statistics
- Global Health
- Mathematical Reviews
- PASCAL
- Science Citation Index
- Scopus
- Zentralblatt MATH

According to the Journal Citation Reports, Stochastic Processes and Their Applications has a 2020 impact factor of 1.467.
