= Institute of Mathematical Statistics =

International learned society for mathematical statistics

The Institute of Mathematical Statistics (IMS) is a professional organization for statistics and probability, headquartered in Shaker Heights, Ohio, United States.

The Institute currently has about 4,000 members in all parts of the world. Beginning in 2005, the institute started offering joint membership with the Bernoulli Society for Mathematical Statistics and Probability as well as with the International Statistical Institute. The Institute was founded in 1935 with Harry C. Carver and Henry L. Rietz as its two most important supporters. The institute publishes a variety of journals, and holds several international conference every year.

== Publications ==
The Institute publishes five journals:

- Annals of Statistics
- Annals of Applied Statistics
- Annals of Probability
- Annals of Applied Probability
- Statistical Science

In addition, it co-sponsors:

- Electronic Communications in Probability
- Electronic Journal of Probability
- Electronic Journal of Statistics
- Journal of Computational and Graphical Statistics (A joint publication with the American Statistical Association and the Interface Foundation of North America)
- Probability Surveys (A joint publication with the International Statistical Institute and the Bernoulli Society for Mathematical Statistics and Probability)
- Statistics Surveys (A joint publication with the American Statistical Association, the Bernoulli Society for Mathematical Statistics and Probability, and the Statistical Society of Canada)

There are also some affiliated journals:

- Probability and Mathematical Statistics (Wrocław University of Technology)
- Latin American Journal of Probability and Mathematical Statistics

Furthermore, five journals are supported by the IMS:

- Annales de l'Institut Henri Poincaré
- Bayesian Analysis (published by the International Society for Bayesian Analysis)
- Bernoulli (published by the Bernoulli Society for Mathematical Statistics and Probability)
- Brazilian Journal of Probability and Statistics (published by the Brazilian Statistical Association)
- Stochastic Systems

== Fellows ==
The IMS selects an annual class of Fellows who have demonstrated distinction in research or leadership in statistics or probability.

== Meetings ==
Meetings gives scholars and practitioners a platform to present research results, disseminate job opportunities and exchange ideas with each other. The IMS holds an annual meeting called Joint Statistical Meetings (JSM), and sponsors multiple international meetings, for example, Spring Research Conference (SRC).

== See also ==
- List of presidents of the Institute of Mathematical Statistics
