= Gady Kozma =

Israeli mathematician

- גדי קוזמא
- Education: Tel Aviv University
- Known for: Loop-erased random walk, Probability theory, Fourier series
- Awards: Erdős Prize (2008), Rollo Davidson Prize (2010)
- Scientific career
- Fields: Mathematics
- Workplaces: Weizmann Institute of Science
- Doctoral advisor: Alexander Olevskii

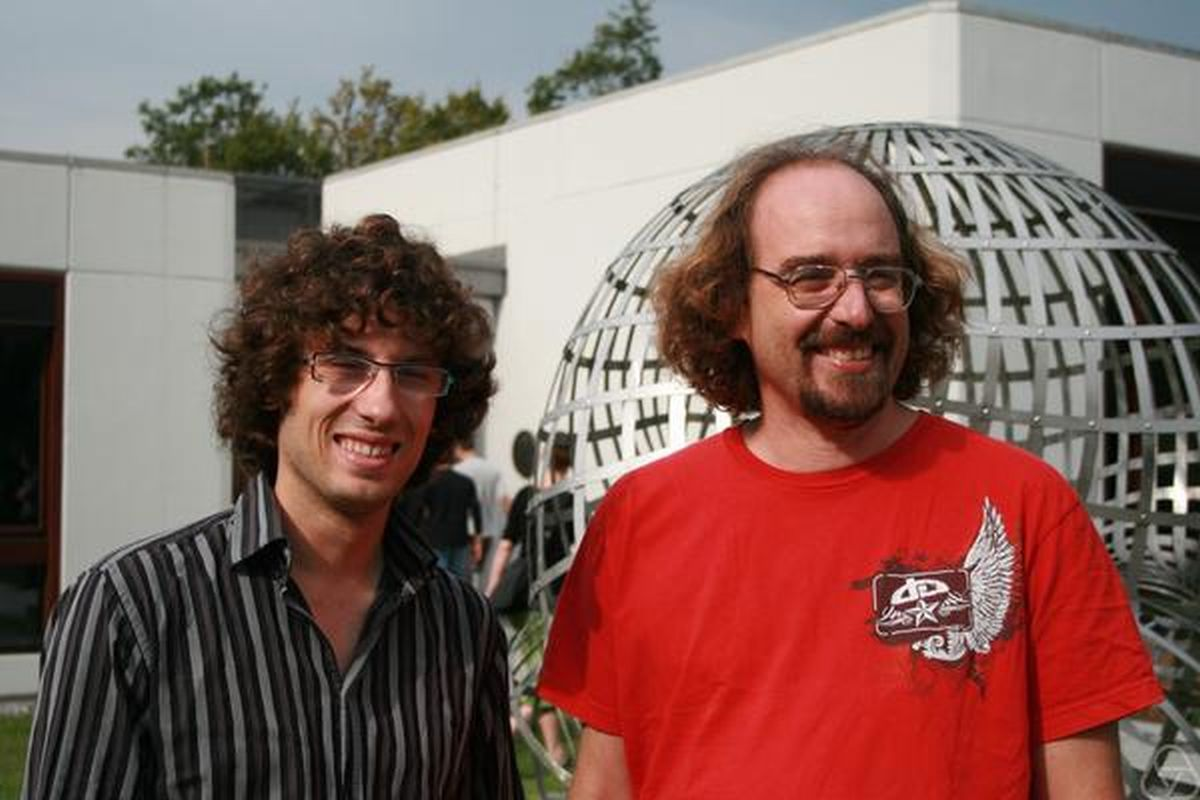
Gady Kozma

Gady Kozma (Hebrew: גדי קוזמא) is an Israeli mathematician. Kozma obtained his PhD in 2001 at the University of Tel Aviv with Alexander Olevskii. He is a scientist at the Weizmann Institute. In 2005, he demonstrated the existence of the scaling limit value (that is, for increasingly finer lattices) of the loop-erased random walk in three dimensions and its invariance under rotations and dilations.

A loop-erased random walk consists of a random walk, whose loops, which form when it intersects itself, are removed. This was introduced to the study of self-avoiding random walk by Gregory Lawler in 1980, but is an independent model in another universality class. In the two-dimensional case, conformal invariance was proved by Lawler, Oded Schramm and Wendelin Werner (with Schramm–Loewner evolution) in 2004. The cases of four and more dimensions were treated by Lawler, the scale limiting value is Brownian motion, in four dimensions. Kozma treated the two-dimensional case in 2002 with a new method. In addition to probability theory, he also deals with Fourier series.

In 2008 he received the Erdős Prize and in 2010 the Rollo Davidson Prize. He is an editor of the Journal d'Analyse Mathématique.

In 2024 together with Shahaf Nitzan he published a reduction of $\theta(p_c)=0$ conjecture to various correlation inequalities decreasing in strength. They are supported by numerical evidence, and if true, any of them will resolve the conjecture.
