= Dying percolation conjecture =

Open problem in probability theory

The dying percolation conjecture (also known as $\theta(p_c)=0$ conjecture/theorem) was a prominent conjecture in percolation theory. It states that critical Bernoulli bond percolation on $\mathbb{Z}^d$ for $d \ge 2$ almost surely has no infinite clusters.

The conjecture is proved for the cases $d=2$ by Kesten, for $d\ge 19$ by Hara and Slade using the technique called "lace expansion". The later result was then improved to $d \ge 11$ by Fitzner and van der Hofstad. An AI proof for all dimension with claimed Lean formalization was reported in September 2026. Since then, the proof was checked by human mathematicians and several other writeups and generalizations have appeared.

The conjecture is sometimes called the "Dying percolation conjecture", a name used by mathematician Gil Kalai. The name evokes the intuition that the cluster at origin "just barely" fails to survive at the critical threshold.

== Background ==
In nearest-neighbor Bernoulli bond percolation on $\mathbb{Z}^d$, each edge of the integer lattice is independently declared open with probability $p\in[0,1]$ and closed otherwise. A cluster is a maximal connected subgraph of open edges. The central question of percolation theory is: for which values of $p$ does an infinite cluster exist almost surely.

The percolation probability $\theta(p)$ is defined as the probability that the cluster containing $0$ is infinite. By a coupling argument, one can show that $\theta$ is a non-decreasing function of $p$. As a corollary, for any dimension $d$ there exists a critical probability (denoted by $p_c$), such that

- For $p < p_c$, every cluster is almost surely finite.
- For $p > p_c$, an infinite cluster almost surely exists.

The conjecture asks whether $\theta(p_c) = 0$, i.e. whether $\theta$ is continuous or has a discontinuity at $p_c$.

== Equivalent formulations ==
The following statements are equivalent for Bernoulli percolation on $\mathbb{Z}^d$:

- Bernoulli bond percolation with critical parameter $p_c$ has no infinite cluster almost surely;
- No infinite cluster at criticality at the origin: $\theta(p_c) = 0$;
- Continuity of $\theta$ at $p_c$;
- Continuity of $\theta$.

The last formulation is equivalent to the others, since Aizenman, Kesten and Newman showed that $\theta$ is continuous at all points of $[0, 1]$ except for possibly $p_c$.

== Significance ==
The $\theta(p_c)=0$ conjecture was among the central open problems in percolation theory. Benjamini et al. (1999) open their paper by describing it as "the main long-standing open question in percolation theory". Raphaël Cerf called it "The main open question in percolation theory" in 2026, just before it was proved. Fields medalist Hugo Duminil-Copin in his ICM lecture "Sixty years of percolation" frames the development of percolation theory around this conjecture. Louigi Addario-Berry suggested that it's among the most important problems in the larger field of probability theory.

This conjecture needs to be true for most percolation critical exponents to be well-defined. As such, it is predicted by physicists studying phase transition theory. The most relevant physically case ($d=3$) remained open the longest.

== Known results ==
=== d=1 ===
For $d=1$, the critical probability $p_c=1$ and
$$\theta(p) = \begin{cases}0,\text{ if }p<1\\
1,\text{ if }p=1.
\end{cases}$$
So the conjecture is false. However, for $d \ge 2$, $p_c \in (0, 1)$, and the conjecture is widely believed to be true.

=== d=2 ===
The dimension $d=2$ is the only dimension (besides 1) where $p_c$ is known exactly. For the other dimensions, there are only numerical approximations. It was proven to be $\frac{1}{2}$ by Kesten after years of being the problem that drove most of the efforts in the field. This resolved the conjecture for $d=2$, since $\theta\left(\frac{1}{2}\right)=0$ was already proven by Harris.

For 2-dimensional lattices, continuity of the phase transition is proved only for some lattices other than square lattice. It is conjectured for them to belong to the same universality class and so to have the same critical behavior.

=== High dimensions ($d \ge 11$) ===
For larger $d$, the conjecture is listed as Problem 5 in Section 12 of Kesten (1982). Since then, the partial cases and generalizations of the conjecture received much attention

In 1990, Hara and Slade used the lace expansion technique to show that percolation at the critical parameter $p_c$ exhibits a mean-field behavior. Namely, they showed that quantities such as $\theta$ obey the power laws, with exponents predicted by the mean-field theory. Later, their techniques were improved to lower the dimension down to 11. However, the mean-field behavior cannot hold in dimensions 5 and less, so dimensions 3, 4 and 5 cannot be covered by an extension of this proof. For dimensions higher than 6, the conjecture is true for a "spread out" percolation, where additional edges are added to any pair of vertices on distance less than a large enough parameter $L$

=== Percolation on half-space ===
It is shown in Barsky, Grimmett & Newman (1991) that for any $d \ge 2$, the critical bond percolation restricted to a half-space $\mathbb{N}\times \mathbb{Z}^{d-1}$ almost surely doesn't contain an infinite cluster. This is in contrast with the result of Grimmett & Marstrand (1990) that for any $p > p_c$, the percolation on a slab $[0, n]^{d-2} \times \mathbb{Z}^2$ almost surely has an infinite cluster for large enough $n$.

=== Nonamenable and exponential-growth graphs ===
The conjecture has been verified for a large class of transitive graphs whose growth is faster than any polynomial.

The foundational result in this direction is due to Benjamini et al. (1999): critical Bernoulli percolation on any Cayley graph of a nonamenable group has no infinite clusters. As a trivial partial case, it covers infinite $d$-regular trees.

In Hutchcroft (2016), this result was extended to all quasi-transitive graphs of exponential growth.

== Resolution ==
=== Reduction to a conjectural correlation inequality ===
In January 2024, Gady Kozma and Shahaf Nitzan wrote a paper Kozma & Nitzan (2024),, where they reduced the conjecture to various correlation inequalities. The inequalities are decreasing in strength. The authors showed that each of the conjectured inequalities would imply the dying percolation conjecture. Inequalities were supported by numerical evidence.

=== Proof by Anthropic ===
On August 26, 2026, Justin Leder posted a commit 795efb8 in a Github repository of Anthropic not belonging to any branch of the repository. The commit contained a Lean formalization of the weakest of the conjectured inequalities by Kozma and Nitzan (Conjecture 3) as well as a condensed 15-page pdf serving as a guide to the repository. Together with the result of Kozma and Nitzan it completed the proof of the dying percolation conjeture.

Commit 795efb8 was soon discovered by Twitter users and became known among the mathematical community. The write-ups and generalizations followed. Ahmed Bou-Rabee published AI-generated explanations of the proof. The explanations also strengthened the result, implying the conjecture for site percolation. Arthur Blanc-Renaudie published notes, streamlining the proof substantially and condensing it to 9 pages. The proof in the notes also shows the strongest conjecture (Conjecture 4) of Kozma & Nitzan (2024). Soon, Conjecture 4 was found true in a more general setting of FK-percolation.
