= Correlation inequality =

Inequalities satisfied by the correlation functions

A correlation inequality is any of a number of inequalities satisfied by the correlation functions of a model. Such inequalities are of particular use in statistical mechanics and in percolation theory.

Examples include:

- Bell's inequality
- FKG inequality
- Griffiths inequality, and its generalisation, the Ginibre inequality
- Gaussian correlation inequality
