= FKG =

FKG may refer to:

- Falkirk Grahamston railway station, in Scotland
- FKG inequality
- Furkating Junction railway station, in Assam, India
- Genk railway station, in Belgium
