= Benjamini =

Benjamini may refer to:

- Itai Benjamini, Israeli mathematician
- Yoav Benjamini (born 1949), Israeli statistician
