= Maury Bramson =

American mathematician

Maury Daniel Bramson (born 1951 in New York City) is an American mathematician, specializing in probability theory and mathematical statistics.

== Education and career ==
Bramson grew up in the Los Angeles area and graduated with a bachelor's degree in mathematics from the University of California, Berkeley after having also attended the University of California, San Diego and having participated in the University of California's Education Abroad Program at the University of Göttingen. He graduated with a master's degree in statistics from Stanford University. In 1977 he received his PhD from Cornell University with thesis Maximal Displacement of Branching Brownian Motion under the supervision of Harry Kesten. Bramson was an instructor at the Courant Institute of Mathematical Sciences. He was a member of the mathematical faculties of the University of Wisconsin–Madison and the University of California, Davis before becoming a professor at the University of Minnesota. He was at the Institute for Advanced Study for the academic year 1995–1996.

Bramson's research deals with models of interacting particle systems, stochastic networks, and branching processes. The models are motivated by physical and biological science, engineering, and computer science.

Bramson was an Invited Speaker at the International Congress of Mathematicians in Berlin in 1998. He was elected a Fellow of the American Mathematical Society in the class of 2015 for "contributions to stochastic processes and their applications." He was elected a member of the National Academy of Sciences in 2017. He is also a Fellow of the Institute of Mathematical Statistics.

== Selected publications ==
=== Articles ===
- Bramson, Maury; Griffeath, David (1979). "Renormalizing the 3-Dimensional Voter Model". The Annals of Probability. 7 (3): 418–432. doi:10.1214/aop/1176995043.
- Bramson, Maury; Griffeath, David (1980). "Asymptotics for interacting particle systems onZ D". Zeitschrift für Wahrscheinlichkeitstheorie und Verwandte Gebiete. 53 (2): 183–196. doi:10.1007/BF01013315. S2CID 123164606.
- Bramson, Maury; Lebowitz, Joel L. (1988). "Asymptotic Behavior of Densities in Diffusion-Dominated Annihilation Reactions". Physical Review Letters. 61 (21): 2397–2400. Bibcode:1988PhRvL..61.2397B. doi:10.1103/PhysRevLett.61.2397. PMID 10039107.
- Andjel, E. D.; Bramson, M. D.; Liggett, T. M. (1988). "Shocks in the asymmetric exclusion process". Probability Theory and Related Fields. 78 (2): 231–247. doi:10.1007/BF00322020. S2CID 123554962.
- Bramson, Maury; Durrett, Rick (1988). "A simple proof of the stability criterion of Gray and Griffeath". Probability Theory and Related Fields. 80 (2): 293–298. doi:10.1007/BF00356107. S2CID 15722615.
- Bramson, Maury; Griffeath, David (1989). "Flux and Fixation in Cyclic Particle Systems". The Annals of Probability. 17 (1): 26–45. doi:10.1214/aop/1176991492. JSTOR 2244194.
- Bramson, M.; Durrett, R.; Swindle, G. (1989). "Statistical Mechanics of Crabgrass". The Annals of Probability. 17 (2): 444–481. doi:10.1214/aop/1176991410. JSTOR 2244276.
- Bramson, Maury; Durrett, Rick; Schonmann, Roberto H. (1991). "The Contact Processes in a Random Environment". The Annals of Probability. 19 (3): 960–983. doi:10.1214/aop/1176990331. JSTOR 2244469.
- Lawler, Gregory F.; Bramson, Maury; Griffeath, David (1992). "Internal Diffusion Limited Aggregation". The Annals of Probability. 20 (4): 2117–2140. doi:10.1214/aop/1176989542. JSTOR 2244742.
- Bramson, Maury (1994). "Instability of FIFO Queueing Networks". The Annals of Applied Probability. 4 (2): 414–431. doi:10.1214/aoap/1177005066.
- Bramson, Maury (1994). "Instability of FIFO Queueing Networks with Quick Service Times". The Annals of Applied Probability. 4 (3): 693–718. doi:10.1214/aoap/1177004967.

=== Books ===
- Bramson, Maury (1983). Convergence of solutions of the Kolmogorov equation to travelling waves. Providence, R.I.: American Mathematical Society. ISBN 9780821822852.
- Bramson, Maury; Durrett, Rick Durrett, eds. (1999). Perplexing problems in probability : festschrift in honor of Harry Kesten. Boston: Birkhäuser. 2012 pbk reprint
- Bramson, Maury (26 June 2008). Stability of Queueing Networks: École d'Été de Probabilités de Saint-Flour XXXVI-2006. Springer Science & Business Media. ISBN 978-3-540-68895-2.
