= Griffiths inequality =

Correlation inequality in statistical mechanics

In statistical mechanics, the Griffiths inequality, sometimes also called Griffiths–Kelly–Sherman inequality or GKS inequality, named after Robert B. Griffiths, is a correlation inequality for ferromagnetic spin systems. Informally, it says that in ferromagnetic spin systems, if the 'a-priori distribution' of the spin is invariant under spin flipping, the correlation of any monomial of the spins is non-negative; and the two point correlation of two monomial of the spins is non-negative.

The inequality was proved by Griffiths for Ising ferromagnets with two-body interactions, then generalised by Kelly and Sherman to interactions involving an arbitrary number of spins, and then by Griffiths to systems with arbitrary spins. A more general formulation was given by Ginibre, and is now called the Ginibre inequality.

== Definitions ==
Let $\textstyle \sigma=\{\sigma_j\}_{j \in \Lambda}$ be a configuration of (continuous or discrete) spins on a lattice $\Lambda$. If $A \subset \Lambda$ is a list of lattice sites, possibly with duplicates, let $\textstyle \sigma_A = \prod_{j \in A} \sigma_j$ be the product of the spins in $A$.

Assign an a-priori measure $d\mu(\sigma)$ on the spins; let $H$ be an energy functional of the form

$$H(\sigma)=-\sum_{A} J_A \sigma_A ~,$$

where the sum is over lists of sites $A$, and let

$$Z=\int d\mu(\sigma) e^{-H(\sigma)}$$

be the partition function. As usual,

$$\langle f \rangle = \frac{1}{Z} \int d\mu(\sigma) f(\sigma) e^{-H(\sigma)}$$

stands for the ensemble average.

The system is called ferromagnetic if, for any list of sites $A$, $J_A \ge 0$. The system is called invariant under spin flipping if, for any $j$ in $\Lambda$, the measure $\mu$ is preserved under the sign flipping map $\sigma \to \tau$, where

$$\tau_k = \begin{cases}
\sigma_k, &k\neq j, \\
- \sigma_k, &k = j.
\end{cases}$$

== Statement of inequalities ==
=== First Griffiths inequality ===
In a ferromagnetic spin system which is invariant under spin flipping,

$$\langle \sigma_A\rangle \geq 0$$

for any list of spins A.

=== Second Griffiths inequality ===
In a ferromagnetic spin system which is invariant under spin flipping,

$$\langle \sigma_A\sigma_B\rangle \geq
\langle \sigma_A\rangle \langle \sigma_B\rangle$$

for any lists of spins A and B.

The first inequality is a special case of the second one, corresponding to B = $\varnothing$.

== Proof ==
Observe that the partition function is non-negative by definition.

Proof of first inequality: Expand

$$e^{-H(\sigma)} = \prod_{B} \sum_{k \geq 0} \frac{J_B^k \sigma_B^k}{k!} = \sum_{\{k_C\}_C} \prod_B \frac{J_B^{k_B} \sigma_B^{k_B}}{k_B!}~,$$

then

$$\begin{align}Z \langle \sigma_A \rangle
&= \int d\mu(\sigma) \sigma_A e^{-H(\sigma)}
=  \sum_{\{k_C\}_C} \prod_B \frac{J_B^{k_B}}{k_B!} \int d\mu(\sigma) \sigma_A \sigma_B^{k_B} \\
&= \sum_{\{k_C\}_C} \prod_B \frac{J_B^{k_B}}{k_B!} \int d\mu(\sigma) \prod_{j \in \Lambda} \sigma_j^{n_A(j) + k_B n_B(j)}~,\end{align}$$

where n_{A}(j) stands for the number of times that j appears in A. Now, by invariance under spin flipping,

$$\int d\mu(\sigma) \prod_j \sigma_j^{n(j)} = 0$$

if at least one n(j) is odd, and the same expression is obviously non-negative for even values of n. Therefore, $Z \langle \sigma_A \rangle \ge 0$, hence also $\langle\sigma_A\rangle \ge 0$.

Proof of second inequality. For the second Griffiths inequality, double the random variable, i.e. consider a second copy of the spin, $\sigma'$, with the same distribution of $\sigma$. Then

$$\langle \sigma_A\sigma_B\rangle-
\langle \sigma_A\rangle \langle \sigma_B\rangle=
\langle\langle\sigma_A(\sigma_B-\sigma'_B)\rangle\rangle~.$$

Introduce the new variables

$$\sigma_j=\tau_j+\tau_j'~,
\qquad
\sigma'_j=\tau_j-\tau_j'~.$$

The doubled system $\langle\langle\;\cdot\;\rangle\rangle$ is ferromagnetic in $\tau, \tau'$ because $-H(\sigma)-H(\sigma')$ is a polynomial in $\tau, \tau'$ with positive coefficients

$$\begin{align}
\sum_A J_A (\sigma_A+\sigma'_A) &= \sum_A J_A\sum_{X\subset A}
\left[1+(-1)^{|X|}\right] \tau_{A \setminus X} \tau'_X
\end{align}$$

Besides the measure on $\tau,\tau'$ is invariant under spin flipping because $d\mu(\sigma)d\mu(\sigma')$ is. Finally the monomials $\sigma_A$, $\sigma_B-\sigma'_B$ are polynomials in $\tau,\tau'$ with positive coefficients

$$\begin{align}
\sigma_A &=  \sum_{X \subset A} \tau_{A \setminus X} \tau'_{X}~, \\
\sigma_B-\sigma'_B &= \sum_{X\subset B}
\left[1-(-1)^{|X|}\right] \tau_{B \setminus X} \tau'_X~.
\end{align}$$

The first Griffiths inequality applied to $\langle\langle\sigma_A(\sigma_B-\sigma'_B)\rangle\rangle$ gives the result.

More details are in and.

== Extension: Ginibre inequality ==
The Ginibre inequality is an extension, found by Jean Ginibre, of the Griffiths inequality.

=== Formulation ===
Let (Γ, μ) be a probability space. For functions f, h on Γ, denote

$$\langle f \rangle_h = \int f(x) e^{-h(x)} \, d\mu(x) \Big/ \int e^{-h(x)} \, d\mu(x).$$

Let A be a set of real functions on Γ such that. for every f_{1},f_{2},...,f_{n} in A, and for any choice of signs ±,

$$\iint d\mu(x) \, d\mu(y) \prod_{j=1}^n (f_j(x) \pm f_j(y)) \geq 0.$$

Then, for any f,g,−h in the convex cone generated by A,

$$\langle fg\rangle_h - \langle f \rangle_h \langle g \rangle_h \geq 0.$$

=== Proof ===
Let

$$Z_h = \int e^{-h(x)} \, d\mu(x).$$

Then

$$\begin{align}
&Z_h^2 \left( \langle fg\rangle_h - \langle f \rangle_h \langle g \rangle_h \right)\\
&\qquad= \iint d\mu(x) \, d\mu(y) f(x) (g(x) - g(y)) e^{-h(x)-h(y)} \\
&\qquad= \sum_{k=0}^\infty
\iint d\mu(x) \, d\mu(y) f(x) (g(x) - g(y)) \frac{(-h(x)-h(y))^k}{k!}.
\end{align}$$

Now the inequality follows from the assumption and from the identity

$$f(x) = \frac{1}{2} (f(x)+f(y)) + \frac{1}{2} (f(x)-f(y)).$$

=== Examples ===
- To recover the (second) Griffiths inequality, take Γ = {−1, +1}^{Λ}, where Λ is a lattice, and let μ be a measure on Γ that is invariant under sign flipping. The cone A of polynomials with positive coefficients satisfies the assumptions of the Ginibre inequality.
- (Γ, μ) is a commutative compact group with the Haar measure, A is the cone of real positive definite functions on Γ.
- Γ is a totally ordered set, A is the cone of real positive non-decreasing functions on Γ. This yields Chebyshev's sum inequality. For extension to partially ordered sets, see FKG inequality.

== Applications ==
- The thermodynamic limit of the correlations of the ferromagnetic Ising model (with non-negative external field h and free boundary conditions) exists.

This is because increasing the volume is the same as switching on new couplings J_{B} for a certain subset B. By the second Griffiths inequality

$$\frac{\partial}{\partial J_B}\langle \sigma_A\rangle=
\langle \sigma_A\sigma_B\rangle-
\langle \sigma_A\rangle \langle \sigma_B\rangle\geq 0$$

Hence $\langle \sigma_A\rangle$ is monotonically increasing with the volume; then it converges since it is bounded by 1.

- The one-dimensional, ferromagnetic Ising model with interactions $J_{x,y}\sim |x-y|^{-\alpha}$ displays a phase transition if $1<\alpha <2$.

This property can be shown in a hierarchical approximation, that differs from the full model by the absence of some interactions: arguing as above with the second Griffiths inequality, the results carries over the full model.

- The Ginibre inequality provides the existence of the thermodynamic limit for the free energy and spin correlations for the two-dimensional classical XY model. Besides, through Ginibre inequality, Kunz and Pfister proved the presence of a phase transition for the ferromagnetic XY model with interaction $J_{x,y}\sim |x-y|^{-\alpha}$ if $2<\alpha < 4$.
- Aizenman and Simon used the Ginibre inequality to prove that the two point spin correlation of the ferromagnetic classical XY model in dimension $D$, coupling $J>0$ and inverse temperature $\beta$ is dominated by (i.e. has upper bound given by) the two point correlation of the ferromagnetic Ising model in dimension $D$, coupling $J>0$, and inverse temperature $\beta/2$

$$\langle \mathbf{s}_i\cdot \mathbf{s}_j\rangle_{J,2\beta}
\le \langle \sigma_i\sigma_j\rangle_{J,\beta}$$

Hence the critical $\beta$ of the XY model cannot be smaller than the double of the critical $\beta$ of the Ising model

$$\beta_c^{XY}\ge 2\beta_c^{\rm Is}~;$$

in dimension D = 2 and coupling J = 1, this gives

$$\beta_c^{XY} \ge \ln(1 + \sqrt{2}) \approx 0.88~.$$

- There exists a version of the Ginibre inequality for the Coulomb gas that implies the existence of thermodynamic limit of correlations.
- Other applications (phase transitions in spin systems, XY model, XYZ quantum chain) are reviewed in.
