= Van den Berg–Kesten inequality =

Inequality in probability theory

- Type: Theorem
- Field: Probability theory
- Symbolic statement: $\mathbb P(A \mathbin \square B) \le \mathbb P(A) \mathbb P(B)$
- Conjectured by: van den Berg and Kesten
- Conjectured in: 1985
- First proof by: Reimer

In probability theory, the van den Berg–Kesten (BK) inequality or van den Berg–Kesten–Reimer (BKR) inequality states that the probability for two random events to both happen, and at the same time one can find "disjoint certificates" to show that they both happen, is at most the product of their individual probabilities. The special case for two monotone events (the notion as used in the FKG inequality) was first proved by van den Berg and Kesten in 1985, who also conjectured that the inequality holds in general, not requiring monotonicity. Reimer later proved this conjecture. The inequality is applied to probability spaces with a product structure, such as in percolation problems.

== Statement ==
Let $\Omega_1, \Omega_2, \ldots, \Omega_n$ be probability spaces, each of finitely many elements. The inequality applies to spaces of the form $\Omega = \Omega_1 \times \Omega_2 \times \cdots \times \Omega_n$, equipped with the product measure, so that each element $x = (x_1, \ldots, x_n) \in \Omega$ is given the probability
$$\mathbb P(\{x\}) = \mathbb P_1(\{x_1\}) \cdots \mathbb P_n(\{x_n\}).$$

For two events $A, B\subseteq \Omega$, their disjoint occurrence $A \mathbin{\square} B$ is defined as the event consisting of configurations $x$ whose memberships in $A$ and in $B$ can be verified on disjoint subsets of indices. Formally, $x \in A \mathbin{\square} B$ if there exist subsets $I, J \subseteq [n]$ such that:

1. $I \cap J = \varnothing,$
2. for all $y$ that agrees with $x$ on $I$ (in other words, $y_i = x_i\ \forall i \in I$), $y$ is also in $A,$ and
3. similarly every $z$ that agrees with $x$ on $J$ is in $B.$

The inequality asserts that:
$$\mathbb P (A \mathbin{\square} B) \le \mathbb P (A) \mathbb P (B)$$
for every pair of events $A$ and $B.$

== Examples ==
=== Coin tosses ===
If $\Omega$ corresponds to tossing a fair coin $n = 10$ times, then each $\Omega_i = \{ H, T\}$ consists of the two possible outcomes, heads or tails, with equal probability. Consider the event $A$ that there exists 3 consecutive heads, and the event $B$ that there are at least 5 heads in total. Then $A \mathbin \square B$ would be the following event: there are 3 consecutive heads, and discarding those there are another 5 heads remaining. This event has probability at most $\mathbb P ( A) \mathbb P ( B),$ which is to say the probability of getting $A$ in 10 tosses, and getting $B$ in another 10 tosses, independent of each other.

Numerically, $\mathbb P ( A) = 520/1024 \approx 0.5078,$ $\mathbb P ( B) = 638/1024 \approx 0.6230,$ and their disjoint occurrence would imply at least 8 heads, so $\mathbb P ( A\mathbin \square B) \le \mathbb P(\text{8 heads or more}) = 56/1024 \approx 0.0547.$

=== Percolation ===
In (Bernoulli) bond percolation of a graph, the $\Omega_i$'s are indexed by edges. Each edge is kept (or "open") with some probability $p,$ or otherwise removed (or "closed"), independent of other edges, and one studies questions about the connectivity of the remaining graph, for example the event $u \leftrightarrow v$ that there is a path between two vertices $u$ and $v$ using only open edges. For events of such form, the disjoint occurrence $A \mathbin \square B$ is the event where there exist two open paths not sharing any edges (corresponding to the subsets $I$ and $J$ in the definition), such that the first one providing the connection required by $A,$ and the second for $B.$

The inequality can be used to prove a version of the exponential decay phenomenon in the subcritical regime, namely that on the integer lattice graph $\mathbb Z^d,$ for $p < p_\mathrm c$ a suitably defined critical probability, the radius of the connected component containing the origin obeys a distribution with exponentially small tails:

$$\mathbb P( 0 \leftrightarrow \partial [-r, r]^d) \le \exp(- c r)$$
for some constant $c > 0$ depending on $p.$ Here $\partial [-r, r]^d$ consists of vertices $x$ that satisfies $\max_{1 \le i \le d} |x_i| = r.$

== Extensions ==
=== Multiple events ===
When there are three or more events, the operator $\square$ may not be associative, because given a subset of indices $K$ on which $x \in A \mathbin \square B$ can be verified, it might not be possible to split $K$ a disjoint union $I \sqcup J$ such that $I$ witnesses $x \in A$ and $J$ witnesses $x \in B$. For example, there exists an event $A \subseteq \{0, 1\}^6$ such that $\left((A \mathbin \square A) \mathbin \square A\right) \mathbin \square A \neq (A \mathbin \square A) \mathbin \square (A \mathbin \square A).$

Nonetheless, one can define the $k$-ary BKR operation of events $A_1, A_2, \ldots, A_k$ as the set of configurations $x$ where there are pairwise disjoint subset of indices $I_i \subseteq [n]$ such that $I_i$ witnesses the membership of $x$ in $A_i.$ This operation satisfies:
$$A_1 \mathbin \square A_2 \mathbin \square A_3 \mathbin \square \cdots \mathbin \square A_k \subseteq \left( \cdots \left((A_1 \mathbin \square A_2) \mathbin \square A_3 \right) \mathbin \square \cdots \right) \mathbin \square A_k,$$
whence
$$\begin{align}
\mathbb P( A_1 \mathbin \square A_2 \mathbin \square A_3 \mathbin \square \cdots \mathbin \square A_k) &\le \mathbb P\left(
\left( \cdots \left((A_1 \mathbin \square A_2) \mathbin \square A_3 \right) \mathbin \square \cdots \right) \mathbin \square A_k\right) \\
&\le \mathbb P( A_1) \mathbb P( A_2) \cdots \mathbb P( A_k)
\end{align}$$
by repeated use of the original BK inequality. This inequality was one factor used to analyse the winner statistics from the Florida Lottery and identify what Mathematics Magazine referred to as "implausibly lucky" individuals, confirmed later by enforcement investigation that law violations were involved.

=== Spaces of larger cardinality ===
When $\Omega_i$ is allowed to be infinite, measure theoretic issues arise. For $\Omega = [0, 1]^n$ and $\mathbb P$ the Lebesgue measure, there are measurable subsets $A, B \subseteq \Omega$ such that $A \mathbin \square B$ is non-measurable (so $\mathbb P(A \mathbin \square B)$ in the inequality is not defined), but the following theorem still holds:

If $A, B \subseteq [0, 1]^n$ are Lebesgue measurable, then there is some Borel set $C$ such that:

- $A \mathbin \square B \subseteq C,$ and
- $\mathbb P(C) \le \mathbb P(A) \mathbb P(B).$
