= Vladas Sidoravicius =

Lithuanian-Brazilian mathematician (1963–2019)

Vladas Sidoravicius (1963, Vilnius, Lithuania – 23 May 2019, Shanghai) was a Lithuanian-Brazilian mathematician, specializing in probability theory.

== Education and career ==
At Vilnius University, Sidoravicius graduated in mathematics with Diplom in 1985 and Magister degree in 1986. At Lomonosov State University he matriculated in 1986 and received his doctoral degree in 1990 with thesis advisor Vadim Aleksandrovich Malyshev. At Heidelberg University and at Paris Dauphine University, Sidoravicius was a postdoc from 1991 to 1993. In the early 1990s he gained an international reputation for his research in probability theory. In 1993 he moved to Brazil. He became a naturalized Brazilian citizen and was a full professor at the Instituto de Matemática Pura e Aplicada (IMPA) in Rio de Janeiro from 1999 to 2015, when he moved to China. At New York University Shanghai (NYU Shanghai), he was a professor of mathematics and also served as the deputy director of NYU Shanghai's NYU-ECNU (East China Normal University) Institute of Mathematical Sciences from 2015 until his death in 2019 at age 55.

Sidoravicius was the author or co-author of over 100 articles in refereed journals. He was a frequent collaborator of Harry Kesten. Their 2008 article A Shape Theory for the Spread of an Infection is particularly noteworthy.

In 2014 Sidoravicius was an invited speaker at the International Congress of Mathematicians in Seoul. In 2019 the XXIII Escola Brasileira de Probabilidade (XXIII Brazilian School of Probability) was dedicated to his memory.

== Selected publications ==
=== Articles ===
- Kesten, H.; Sidoravicius, V.; Zhang, Yu (1998). "Almost all words are seen in critical site percolation on the triangular lattice" (PDF). Electronic Journal of Probability. 3 (10): 1–75. doi:10.1214/EJP.v3-32.
- Kesten, H.; Sidoravicius, V. (2003). "Branching random walk with catalysts" (PDF). Electronic Journal of Probability. 8 (5): 1–51. doi:10.1214/EJP.v8-127.
- Sidoravicius, Vladas; Sznitman, Alain-Sol (2004). "Quenched invariance principles for walks on clusters of percolation or among random conductances". Probability Theory and Related Fields. 129 (2): 219–244. doi:10.1007/s00440-004-0336-0. S2CID 120061442.
- Kesten, Harry; Sidoravicius, Vladas (2005). "The spread of a rumor or infection in a moving population". The Annals of Probability. 33 (6): 2402–2462. arXiv:math/0312496. doi:10.1214/009117905000000413.
- Alexander, Kenneth S.; Sidoravicius, Vladas (2006). "Pinning of polymers and interfaces by random potentials". The Annals of Applied Probability. 16 (2): 636–669. arXiv:math/0501028. doi:10.1214/105051606000000015.
- Kesten, Harry; Sidoravicius, Vladas (2006). "A phase transition in a model for the spread of an infection". Illinois Journal of Mathematics. 50 (1–4): 547–634. arXiv:math/0410371. doi:10.1215/ijm/1258059486. 2009
- Sidoravicius, V.; Sznitman, A. S. (2010). "Connectivity bounds for the vacant set of random interlacements". Annales de l'Institut Henri Poincaré B. 46 (4): 976–990. arXiv:0908.2206. Bibcode:2010AIHPB..46..976S. doi:10.1214/09-AIHP335. S2CID 6853534.
- Ellwood, David; Newman, Charles; Sidoravicius, Vladas; Werner, Wendelin (2012). "Probability and Statistical Physics in Two and More Dimensions". Clay Mathematical Proceedings. 15; XIV Brazilian School of Probability, July 11–August 7, 2010

=== Books ===
- Sidoravicius, V., ed. (31 August 2009). New Trends in Mathematical Physics: Selected contributions of the XVth International Congress on Mathematical Physics. Springer Science & Business Media. ISBN 978-90-481-2810-5.
- Sidoravicius, V., ed. (2002). In and Out of Equilibrium: Probability with a Physics Flavor. Progress in Probability. Vol. 51. Birkhäuser Basel. pp. vii+472. doi:10.1007/978-1-4612-0063-5. ISBN 978-1-4612-6595-5.
- Sidoravicius, V., ed. (2019). Sojourns in Probability Theory and Statistical Physics: A Festschrift for Charles M. Newman. Proceedings in Mathematics & Statistics. Vol. (3 vols.). Springer.
  - Vol. I. Spin Glasses and Statistical Mechanics.
  - Vol. II. Brownian Web and Percolation.
  - Vol. III. Interacting Particle Systems and Random Walks.
