= Invasion percolation =

Invasion percolation is a mathematical model of realistic fluid distributions for slow immiscible fluid invasion in porous media, in percolation theory. It "explicitly takes into account the transport process taking place". A wetting fluid such as water takes over from a non-wetting fluid such as oil, and capillary forces are taken into account. It was introduced by Wilkinson and Willemsen (1983).

Invasion percolation proceeds in avalanches or bursts, and thus exhibits a form of intermittency. This avalanche behavior has been likened to self-organized criticality.
