= Itai Benjamini =

Israeli mathematician

- איתי בנימין
- Education: Hebrew University of Jerusalem
- Known for: Probability theory, random processes on graphs, noise sensitivity of Boolean functions
- Awards: Rollo Davidson Prize (2004), Morris L. Levinson Prize (2004)
- Scientific career
- Fields: Mathematics
- Workplaces: Weizmann Institute of Science
- Doctoral advisor: Benjamin Weiss

Itai Benjamini (Hebrew: איתי בנימין) is an Israeli mathematician who holds the Renee and Jay Weiss Chair in the Department of Mathematics at the Weizmann Institute of Science.

== Education ==
Benjamini completed his Ph.D. in 1992 at the Hebrew University of Jerusalem, under the supervision of Benjamin Weiss. His dissertation was entitled "Random Walks on Graphs and Manifolds". In 2004 he won the Rollo Davidson Prize for young probability theorists "for his work across probability, including the analytic and geometric, particularly in the study of random processes associated with graphs". In the same year he also won the Morris L. Levinson Prize of the Weizmann Institute. He was an invited speaker at the International Congress of Mathematicians in 2010, speaking about "random planar metrics".^{[B]}

== Career ==
Benjamini was a long time collaborator of Oded Schramm. Their joint works included papers on limits of planar graphs,^{[BS]} noise sensitivity of Boolean functions^{[BKS1]} and first passage percolation^{[BKS2]}. With Olle Häggström, Benjamini edited the selected works of Oded Schramm.^{[S]}

Benjamini has also made contributions to the study of the Biham–Middleton–Levine traffic model ^{[AB]} and isoperimetric inequalities on Riemannian manifolds^{[BC]}.

== Selected publications ==
| BC. | Benjamini, Itai; Cao, Jianguo (1996), "A new isoperimetric comparison theorem for surfaces of variable curvature", Duke Mathematical Journal, 85 (2): 359–396, doi:10.1215/S0012-7094-96-08515-4, MR 1417620. |

| BS. | Benjamini, Itai; Schramm, Oded (2001), "Recurrence of distributional limits of finite planar graphs", Electronic Journal of Probability, 6, arXiv:math/0011019, doi:10.1214/EJP.v6-96, MR 1873300. |

| BKS1. | Benjamini, Itai; Kalai, Gil; Schramm, Oded (1999), "Noise sensitivity of Boolean functions and applications to percolation", Publications Mathématiques de l'Institut des Hautes Études Scientifiques, 90: 5–43, arXiv:math/9811157, doi:10.1007/BF02698830. |

| BKS2. | Benjamini, Itai; Kalai, Gil; Schramm, Oded (2003), "First passage percolation has sublinear distance variance", Ann. Probab., 31 (4): 197–1978, arXiv:math/0203262, Bibcode:2002math......3262B, doi:10.1214/aop/1068646373. |

| AB. | Austin, Tim; Benjamini, Itai (2006), For what number of cars must self organization occur in the Biham–Middleton–Levine traffic model from any possible starting configuration?, arXiv:math/0607759, Bibcode:2006math......7759A. |

| B. | Benjamini, Itai (2010), "Random planar metrics", Proceedings of the International Congress of Mathematicians, vol. IV, Hindustan Book Agency, New Delhi, pp. 2177–2187, MR 2827966. |

| S. | Schramm, Oded (2011), Benjamini, Itai; Häggström, Olle (eds.), Selected works of Oded Schramm, Selected Works in Probability and Statistics, New York: Springer, doi:10.1007/978-1-4419-9675-6, ISBN 978-1-4419-9674-9, MR 2885266. |
