= Ted Harris (mathematician) =

American mathematician

- Born: January 11, 1919
- Died: November 3, 2005 (aged 86)
- Education: Princeton University
- Known for: Harris chain
- Scientific career
- Workplaces: RAND Corporation; University of Southern California
- Thesis: Some Theorems on the Bernoullian Multiplicative Process (1947)
- Doctoral advisor: Samuel S. Wilks

Theodore Edward Harris (11 January 1919 – 3 November 2005) was an American mathematician known for his research on stochastic processes, including such areas as general state-space Markov chains (often now called Harris chains), the theory of branching processes and stochastic models of interacting particle systems such as the contact process. The Harris inequality in statistical physics and percolation theory is named after him.

He received his Ph.D. at Princeton University in 1947 under advisor Samuel Wilks. From 1947 until 1966 he worked for the RAND Corporation, heading their mathematics department from 1959 to 1965. From 1966 until retirement in 1989 he was Professor of Mathematics and Electrical Engineering at University of Southern California.

He was elected to the United States National Academy of Sciences in 1988.

== Selected publications ==
=== Books ===
- Harris, Theodore Edward (1963). The theory of branching processes (PDF). Grundlehren der mathematischen Wissenschaften. Vol. 119. Berlin: Springer-Verlag. ISBN 978-3-642-51868-3.

=== Papers ===
- Harris, Theodore; Arrow, Kenneth J.; Marschak, Jacob (July 1951). "Optimal inventory policy". Econometrica. 19 (3): 250–272. doi:10.2307/1906813. JSTOR 1906813.
- Harris, T.E. (December 1974). "Contact interactions on a lattice". The Annals of Probability. 2 (6): 969–988. doi:10.1214/aop/1176996493. JSTOR 2959099.
