= Jean Ginibre =

French mathematical physicist (1938–2020)

- Born: 4 March 1926
- Died: 26 March 2020 (aged 94)
- Known for: Circular law FKG inequality Ginibre inequality
- Awards: Prix Paul Langevin (1968); Peccot Lectures (1966-1967); Jane Eliza Procter Fellowship
- Scientific career
- Fields: Mathematical physics
- Institutions: Paris-Sud University
- Doctoral students: Monique Combescure

Jean Ginibre (4 March 1938 — 26 March 2020) was a French mathematical physicist. He is known for his contributions to random matrix theory (see circular law), statistical mechanics (see FKG inequality, Ginibre inequality), and partial differential equations. With Martine Le Berre and Yves Pomeau, he provided a kinetic theory for the emission of photons by an atom maintained in an excited state by an intense field that creates Rabi oscillations. He received the Paul Langevin Prize in 1969.

Jean Ginibre was Emeritus Professor at Paris-Sud 11 University. He directed the thesis of Monique Combescure.

== See also ==
- Classical XY model
