= Ahlswede–Daykin inequality =

Correlation-type inequality for four functions on a finite distributive lattice

The Ahlswede–Daykin inequality (Ahlswede & Daykin 1978), also known as the four functions theorem (or inequality), is a correlation-type inequality for four functions on a finite distributive lattice. It is a fundamental tool in statistical mechanics and probabilistic combinatorics (especially random graphs and the probabilistic method).

The inequality states that if $f_1,f_2,f_3,f_4$ are nonnegative functions on a finite distributive lattice such that

$$f_1(x)f_2(y)\le f_3(x\vee y)f_4(x\wedge y)$$

for all x, y in the lattice, then

$$f_1(X)f_2(Y)\le f_3(X\vee Y)f_4(X\wedge Y)$$

for all subsets X, Y of the lattice, where

$$f(X) = \sum_{x\in X}f(x)$$

and

$$X\vee Y = \{x\vee y\mid x\in X, y\in Y\}$$
$$X\wedge Y = \{x\wedge y\mid x\in X, y\in Y\}.$$

The Ahlswede–Daykin inequality can be used to provide a short proof of both the Holley inequality and the FKG inequality. It also implies the XYZ inequality.

For a proof, see the original article (Ahlswede & Daykin 1978) or (Alon & Spencer 2000).

== Generalizations ==
The "four functions theorem" was independently generalized to 2k functions in (Aharoni & Keich 1996) and (Rinott & Saks 1991).

== History ==
The story of the discovery of the Ahlswede–Daykin inequality was described in the Introduction to the A. Ahlswede et al. book:

"The history of the idea of the AD-inequality is very interesting. As Daykin came to a visit to Bielefeld, Ahlswede was just wallpapering. He stood on the ladder, and Daykin wanted to tell him from a newly proven inequality. The declaration was complicated, and Ahlswede said that probably a more general (and easier) theorem should hold. He made directly—on the ladder—a proposal which already was the AD-inequality."

== Sources ==
- Ahlswede, Rudolf; Daykin, David E. (1978), "An inequality for the weights of two families of sets, their unions and intersections", Probability Theory and Related Fields, 43 (3): 183–185, doi:10.1007/BF00536201, ISSN 0178-8051, MR 0491189, S2CID 120659862
- Alon, N.; Spencer, J. H. (2000), The probabilistic method. Second edition. With an appendix on the life and work of Paul Erdős., Wiley-Interscience, New York, ISBN 978-0-471-37046-8, MR 1885388
- Fishburn, P.C. (2001) [1994], "Ahlswede–Daykin inequality", Encyclopedia of Mathematics, EMS Press
- Aharoni, Ron; Keich, Uri (1996), "A Generalization of the Ahlswede Daykin Inequality", Discrete Mathematics, 152 (1–3): 1–12, doi:10.1016/0012-365X(94)00294-S
- Rinott, Yosef; Saks, Michael (1991), "Correlation inequalities and a conjecture for permanents", Combinatorica, 13 (3): 269–277, doi:10.1007/BF01202353, S2CID 206791629
