= Heinz Gumin Prize =

German mathematics prize

The Heinz Gumin Prize for Mathematics is awarded every three to four years to an outstanding mathematician in Germany, Austria or Switzerland. The prize is given by the Carl Friedrich von Siemens Foundation, and is named after the mathematician and computer scientist Heinz Gumin (1928–2008), who was chairman of the Board of that foundation for more than 20 years. At 50,000 euros, the Gumin Prize is the most highly endowed mathematics prize in Germany.

== Award winners ==
- 2010 Gerd Faltings, Director at the Max Planck Institute for Mathematics, Bonn. For his groundbreaking methods and results in arithmetic geometry, which have had a lasting impact on the areas of number theory and geometry.
- 2013 Stefan Müller, Professor of Mathematics at the University of Bonn and at the Hausdorff Center for Mathematics, Bonn. For his groundbreaking contributions to the calculus of variations and elliptic regularity theory, often motivated by innovative applications in solid mechanics
- 2016 Wendelin Werner, Professor of Mathematics at the Swiss Federal Institute of Technology in Zurich. For his groundbreaking contributions to the mathematical justification of universal properties of Brownian motion with applications to central assumptions in statistical physics.
- 2020 Wolfgang Hackbusch, former director of the Max Planck Institute for Mathematics in the Sciences, Leipzig. For groundbreaking contributions to numerical mathematics, in particular to the development of H-matrices and hierarchical tensors.
- 2024 Don Zagier, former director of the Max Planck Institute for Mathematics, Bonn. For groundbreaking research work on number theory and the theory of modular forms.
