= Stefan Müller (mathematician) =

German mathematician

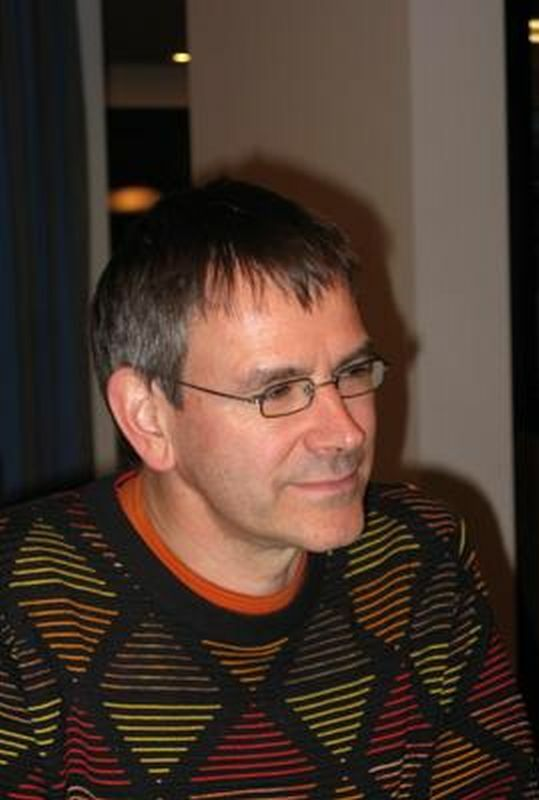
Stefan Müller

Stefan Müller (born 15 March 1962 in Wuppertal) is a German mathematician and currently a professor at the University of Bonn. He has been one of the founding directors of the Max Planck Institute for Mathematics in the Sciences in 1996 and was acting there until 2008.

He is well known for his research in analysis and the calculus of variations. He is interested in the application of mathematical methods in the theory continuum mechanics, especially material science and problems involving microstructures.

== Awards ==
- 1992 - EMS Prize
- 1993 – Max-Planck-Forschungspreis, together Vladimir Sverák (Charles University in Prague)
- 1998 — Invited Speaker of the International Congress of Mathematicians in Berlin
- 1999 – CICIAM Collatz Prize ICIAM Edinburgh
- 2000 – Gottfried Wilhelm Leibniz Prize
- 2006 – Keith Medal of the Royal Society of Edinburgh and Gauss Lectureship of the German Mathematical Society.
- 2013 Heinz Gumin Prize for Mathematics

== Publications ==
- Microstructures, phase transitions and geometry. In: Balog (Hrsg.): Proceedings European Congress of Mathematicians. volume 2, Birkhäuser 1998, S.92.
- with Sverak: Unexpected solutions of first and second order partial differential equations. International Congress of Mathematicians, 1998, Bd.II, S.691, Documenta Mathematica.
- with Bethuel, Huisken, Steffen: Variational models for microstructure and phase transitions. In: Hildebrandt, Struwe: Calculus of Variations and geometric evolution problems. Lecture Notes in Mathematics, volume 1713, 1999, S.85-210.
- Mathematik und intelligente Materialien. In: Aigner, Behrends (Hrsg.): Alles Mathematik. Vieweg 2002.
- Mathematik ist überall. DMV-Mitteilungen, Januar 1998.
- Mit Conti, DeSimone, Dolzmann, F. Otto: Multiscale modeling of materials – the role of analysis. In: Kirkilionis, Krömker, Rannacher, Tomi (Herausgeber): Trends in Nonlinear Analysis. Springer 2003, S.375-408.
- G. Friesecke, R. D. James, S. Müller: A hierarchy of plate models derived from nonlinear elasticity by Gamma-convergence. Arch. Rat. Mech. Anal., volume 180, 2006, S. 183-236.
- C. De Lellis, S. Müller: Sharp rigidity estimates for nearly umbilical surfaces. Journal of Differential Geometry volume 69, 2005, S. 75-110.
- S. Müller, V. Sverak: Convex integration for Lipschitz mappings and counterexamples to regularity. Ann. Math., volume 157, 2003, 715-742.
- G. Friesecke, R. D. James, S. Müller: A theorem on geometric rigidity and the derivation of nonlinear plate theory from three dimensional elasticity. Comm. Pure Appl. Math., volume 55, 2002, 1461-1506.
- A. De Simone, R. V. Kohn, S. Müller, F. Otto: A reduced theory for thin-film micromagnetics. Comm. Pure Appl. Math., volume 55, 2002, 1408-1460.
