= Alexander Moiseevich Olevskii =

Russian-Israeli mathematician

- Александр Моисеевич Олевский
- Born: February 12, 1939 (age 87); Moscow, Russia
- Education: Moscow State University (1963)
- Occupation: Mathematician
- Years active: 1963–present?
- Employer: Tel Aviv University

Alexander Moiseevich Olevskii (Russian: Александр Моисеевич Олевский; born February 12, 1939, in Moscow) is a Russian-Israeli mathematician at Tel Aviv University, specializing in mathematical analysis. As of July 2021, he is a professor emeritus.

He graduated in 1963 with a Candidate of Sciences degree (PhD) from Moscow State University. There he received in 1966 a Russian Doctor of Sciences degree (habilitation). At the Moscow Institute of Electronics and Mathematics, he was from 1988 to 1992 head of the department of algebra and analysis. In the spring of 1996 he was at the Institute for Advanced Study. He has held visiting appointments at universities or institutes in several countries, including France, Australia, Germany, Italy, and the United States.

In 1986 Olevskii was an invited speaker at the International Congress of Mathematicians in Berkeley, California. He was a member of the 2013 Class of Fellows of the American Mathematical Society (announced in 2012). In 2014 he was an invited speaker at the European Congress of Mathematics in Kraków.

His doctoral students include Gady Kozma.

== Selected publications ==
- Olevskii, A. M. (1969). "On the extension of a sequence of functions to a complete orthonormal system". Mathematical Notes of the Academy of Sciences of the USSR. 6 (6): 908–913. doi:10.1007/BF01146412. S2CID 120976873.
- Olevskii, A. M. (1970). "Stability of the Schmidt orthogonalization operator". Izv. Akad. Nauk SSSR Ser. Mat. 34 (4): 803–826. Bibcode:1970IzMat...4..811O. doi:10.1070/IM1970v004n04ABEH000934.
- Olevskii, A. M. (1972). "On operators generating conditional bases in a Hilbert space". Mathematical Notes of the Academy of Sciences of the USSR. 12: 476–482. doi:10.1007/BF01094395. S2CID 124705771.
- Olevskii, A. M. (1975). "Fourier Series with Respect to General Orthogonal Systems". Ergebn. Math. Grenzgen. 86: 1–136. ISBN 3540071032.
- Olevskii, A. M. (1985). "Modifications of functions and Fourier series". Russian Mathematical Surveys. 40 (3): 181. Bibcode:1985RuMaS..40..181O. doi:10.1070/RM1985v040n03ABEH003592. S2CID 250889771.
- Olevskii, A. M. (2004). "Representation of functions by exponentials with positive frequencies". Russian Mathematical Surveys. 59 (1): 171–180. Bibcode:2004RuMaS..59..171O. doi:10.1070/RM2004v059n01ABEH000707. S2CID 250891540. 2004
- Lebedev, V. V.; Olevskii, A. M. (2006). "$L^p$-Fourier multipliers with bounded powers". Izv. Ross. Akad. Nauk, Ser. Mat. 7 (3): 129–166. Bibcode:2006IzMat..70..549L. doi:10.1070/IM2006v070n03ABEH002319. S2CID 250919411.
- Olevskii, Alexander M.; Ulanovskii, Alexander (13 June 2016). Functions with Disconnected Spectrum. American Mathematical Soc. ISBN 9781470428891.
