= Regenerative process =

Class of stochastic processes in applied probability

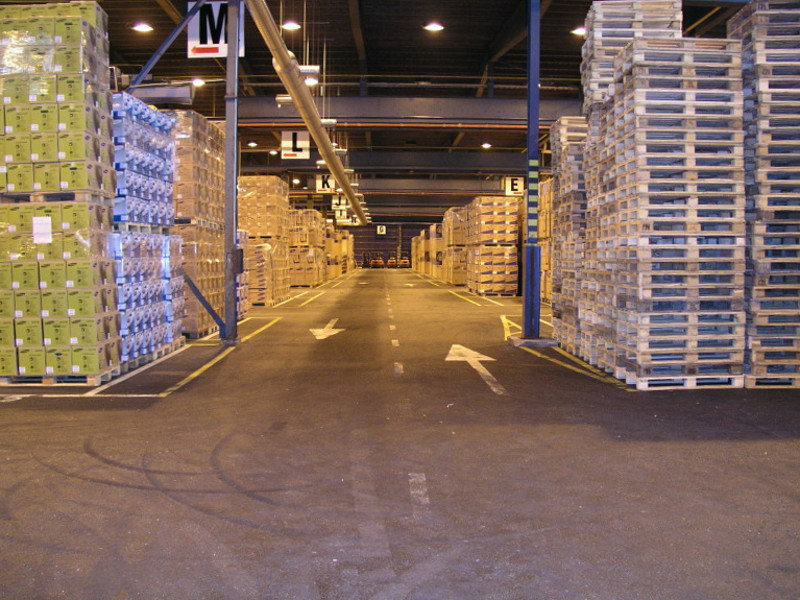
Regenerative processes have been used to model problems in inventory control. The inventory in a warehouse such as this one decreases via a stochastic process due to sales until it gets replenished by a new order.

In applied probability, a regenerative process is a class of stochastic process with the property that certain portions of the process can be treated as being statistically independent of each other. This property can be used in the derivation of theoretical properties of such processes.

== History ==
Regenerative processes were first defined by Walter L. Smith in Proceedings of the Royal Society A in 1955.

== Definition ==
A regenerative process is a stochastic process with time points at which, from a probabilistic point of view, the process restarts itself. These time point may themselves be determined by the evolution of the process. That is to say, the process {X(t), t ≥ 0} is a regenerative process if there exist time points 0 ≤ T_{0} < T_{1} < T_{2} < ... such that the post-T_{k} process {X(T_{k} + t) : t ≥ 0}

- has the same distribution as the post-T_{0} process {X(T_{0} + t) : t ≥ 0}
- is independent of the pre-T_{k} process {X(t) : 0 ≤ t < T_{k}}

for k ≥ 1. Intuitively this means a regenerative process can be split into i.i.d. cycles.

When T_{0} = 0, X(t) is called a nondelayed regenerative process. Else, the process is called a delayed regenerative process.

== Examples ==
- Renewal processes are regenerative processes, with T_{1} being the first renewal.
- Alternating renewal processes, where a system alternates between an 'on' state and an 'off' state.
- A recurrent Markov chain is a regenerative process, with T_{1} being the time of first recurrence. This includes Harris chains.
- Reflected Brownian motion is a regenerative process (where one measures the time it takes particles to leave and come back).

== Properties ==
- By the renewal reward theorem, with probability 1,

$$\lim_{t \to \infty} \frac{1}{t}\int_0^t X(s) ds= \frac{\mathbb{E}[R]}{\mathbb{E}[\tau]}.$$

where $\tau$ is the length of the first cycle and $R=\int_0^\tau X(s) ds$ is the value over the first cycle.

- A measurable function of a regenerative process is a regenerative process with the same regeneration time
