= Circular law =

On eigenvalues of random matrices

In probability theory, more specifically the study of random matrices, the circular law concerns the distribution of eigenvalues of an $n \times n$ random matrix with independent and identically distributed entries in the limit $n \to \infty$.

It asserts that for any sequence of random n × n matrices whose entries are independent and identically distributed random variables, all with mean zero and variance equal to 1/n, the limiting spectral distribution is the uniform distribution over the unit disc.

== Ginibre ensembles ==
We consider Ginibre ensemble matrix of size $N \times N$, defined as follows.

The real Ginibre ensemble is defined by sampling each entry IID form the standard normal distribution. That is, we have $G_{ij} \sim \mathcal N \left(0, 1\right)$.

The complex Ginibre ensemble is defined as $G_{ij} \sim \mathcal N \left(0, \frac{1}{2}\right) + i\mathcal N \left(0, \frac{1}{2}\right)$.

The quaternionic Ginibre ensemble is defined as $G_{ij} \sim \mathcal N \left(0, \frac{1}{4}\right) + i\mathcal N \left(0, \frac{1}{4}\right) + j\mathcal N \left(0, \frac{1}{4}\right) + k\mathcal N \left(0, \frac{1}{4}\right)$. Although, since the quaternion number system is inconvenient, it is usually not sampled as a quaternion matrix of shape $n \times n$, but rather as a complex matrix of shape $2N \times 2N$, divided into $2 \times 2$ blocks of form
$$\begin{bmatrix}
z & w \\
-\bar{w} & \bar{z}
\end{bmatrix}$$
, such that each $z, w$ is IID sampled from $\mathcal N \left(0, \frac{1}{4}\right) + i\mathcal N \left(0, \frac{1}{4}\right)$.

The probability measure of the Ginibre ensemble satisfies
$$\ln \rho(G) = -\frac\beta 2 \sum_{i j} |G_{ij}|^2 - \ln Z_{\beta, N} = \frac\beta 2 \operatorname{Tr}(GG^*) - \ln Z_{\beta, N}$$
where

- $\beta = 1, 2, 4$ respectively for the real, complex, and quaternionic cases;
- $Z_{\beta, N}$ is a normalization factor;
- $\operatorname{Tr}$ is the trace;
- $^*$ is the matrix adjoint.

The most commonly used case is $\beta = 2$, and when "Ginibre ensemble" is spoken of, it by default means the $\beta = 2$ case.

By analogy with the gaussian ensembles, the cases of $\beta = 1, 2, 4$ are also called the GinOE, GinUE, GinSE, meaning "Ginibre Orthogonal/Unitary/Symplectic Ensemble".

== Spectral distribution ==
Let $G_N$ be a Ginibre ensemble matrix of size $N \times N$.

=== Probability density function ===
For $\beta = 2$, the eigenvalues of $G_N$ are distributed according to
$$\rho_N\left(z_1, \ldots, z_N\right)=\frac{1}{Z} \exp \left(-\sum_{k=1}^N\left|z_k\right|^2\right) \prod_{1 \leq j<k \leq N}\left|z_j-z_k\right|^2$$
where $Z = \pi^N \prod_{k=1}^N k!$ is a Selberg integral. Ignoring the term $Z$, the rest of the formula can be obtained by exploiting the biunitary symmetry of the ensemble. That is, for any unitary $U, V$, the ensemble $UGV$ has the same distribution.

For $\beta = 4$, the $2N \times 2N$ matrix has complex eigenvalues that come in conjugate pairs. Index the eigenvalues as $z_1, \dots, z_n, z_{n+1}, \dots, z_{2n}$ such that $z_{j} = \bar z_{n+j}$, then
$$\rho_N\left(z_1, \ldots, z_N\right) \propto
\prod_{l=1}^N e^{-2\left|z_l\right|^2}\left|z_l-\bar{z}_l\right|^2
\prod_{1 \leq j<k \leq N}\left|z_k-z_j\right|^2\left|z_k-\bar{z}_j\right|^2,
\quad \operatorname{Im} z_l>0$$
For $\beta = 1$, the $N \times N$ matrix has $N$ complex eigenvalues, and each eigenvalue has a conjugate that is also an eigenvalue. However, they may no longer come in conjugate pairs, since some eigenvalues may be purely real. It is not even absolutely continuous, thus does not have a probability density function, but decomposes into sectors depending on the number of real eigenvalues. However, at the $N \to \infty$ limit, the circular law is recovered, since there are only $O(\sqrt N)$ eigenvalues exactly on the real line.

=== Determinantal point process ===
For $\beta = 2$, the eigenvalues make up a determinantal point process
$$\rho_{(k), N}\left(z_1, \ldots, z_k\right)=\det\left[K_N\left(z_j, z_l\right)\right]_{j, l=1}^k$$
with correlation kernel
$$K_N(w, z)=\frac{1}{\pi} e^{-\left(|w|^2+|z|^2\right) / 2} \sum_{j=1}^N \frac{(w \bar{z})^{j-1}}{(j-1)!}=\frac{1}{\pi} e^{-\left(|w|^2+|z|^2\right) / 2} e^{w \bar{z}} \frac{\Gamma(N ; w \bar{z})}{\Gamma(N)}$$
where $\Gamma(j ; x)=\int_x^{\infty} t^{j-1} e^{-t} d t$ denotes the upper incomplete gamma function. It has the following asymptotics
$$K_{\infty}^{\mathrm{b}}(w, z):=\lim _{N \rightarrow \infty} K_N(w, z)=\frac{1}{\pi} e^{-\left(|w|^2+|z|^2\right) / 2} e^{w \bar{z}},$$
$$K_{\infty}^{\mathrm{e}}\left(z_1, z_2\right):=\lim _{N \rightarrow \infty} K_N\left(-i \sqrt{N}+z_1,-i \sqrt{N}+z_2\right)=e^{-\left(\left|z_1\right|^2+\left|z_2\right|^2\right) / 2} e^{z_1 \bar{z}_2} h\left(\frac{1}{2}\left(-i z_1+i \bar{z}_2\right)\right)$$
where $h(z)=\frac{1}{2 \pi}(1+\operatorname{erf}(\sqrt{2} z))$.

=== Global law ===
Plot of $\pi\rho(z)$ for varying values of $N$. It rapidly converges to the uniform distribution.

Plugging in the correlation kernel, the average distribution of all eigenvalues is
$$\frac 1N K_N(z, z) = \frac{\Gamma(N; |z|^2)}{\pi N!} = \frac{\int_{|z|^2}^\infty t^{N-1} e^{-t}dt}{\pi N!}$$
Scaling down by $\sqrt N$, we find that the average distribution of the eigenvalues of $\frac{1}{\sqrt{N}} G_N$ to have probability density function
$$\rho(z) = \frac{N^N}{\pi (N-1)!} \int_{|z|^2}^\infty t^{N-1} e^{-Nt} dt$$
which rapidly converges to
$$\begin{cases}\frac 1\pi & \text{if }|z| < 1 \\ 0 & \text{if }|z| > 1\end{cases}$$.

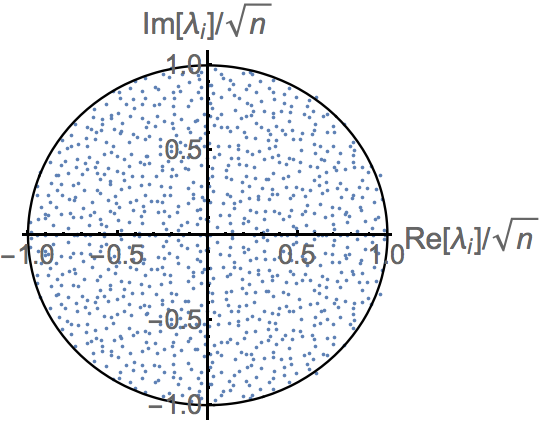
Plot of the real and imaginary parts (scaled by sqrt(1000)) of the eigenvalues of a 1000x1000 matrix with independent, standard normal entries.

More strongly, we have the strong global law. Let $(G_N)_{N=1}^\infty$ be a sequence sampled from the complex Ginibre ensemble. Define $\displaystyle \mu_{\frac{1}{\sqrt{n}} G_n}$ to be the empirical spectral measure of $\frac{1}{\sqrt{N}} G_N$. Then, almost surely (i.e. with probability one), the sequence of measures converges in distribution to the uniform measure on the unit disk.

=== As a Coulomb gas ===
Recall the spectral distribution
$$\rho_N\left(z_1, \ldots, z_N\right)=\frac{1}{Z} \exp \left(-\sum_{k=1}^N\left|z_k\right|^2\right) \prod_{1 \leq j<k \leq N}\left|z_j-z_k\right|^2$$
It can be interpreted as the Boltzmann distribution for a Coulomb gas, or more specifically a two-dimensional one-component plasma (OCP), at inverse temperature $\beta = 2$. Note that here $\beta$ is used to mean something different, and may take any value within $(0, \infty)$.

The gas contains $N$ identical particles, all placed within the plane $\mathbb C$, with total energy
$$E = \frac 12 \sum_{k=1}^N |z_k|^2 - \sum_{1 \leq j < k \leq N} \ln |z_j - z_k|$$
The first term indicates that every particle is attracted to the origin by a force of magnitude $F_k = |z_k|$. The second term indicates that every particle pair is repelling each other by a force of magnitude $F_{jk} = \frac{1}{|z_j - z_k|}$.

For general inverse temperature $\beta$, the OCP has partition function $Z_{N}^{\text{OCP}}(\beta) = \int_{\mathbb C^N} e^{-\beta E} d^Nz$, and free energy $-\beta^{-1} \ln Z_{\beta, N}^{\text{OCP}}$. However, it is theoretically more natural to consider the normalized partition function
$$Z_N^{D_R, \mathrm{OCP}}(\beta)=\frac{1}{N!} A_{N, \beta} Z_N^{\mathrm{OCP}}(\beta), \quad A_{N, \beta}=e^{-\beta N^2\left(\frac{1}{4} \log N-\frac{3}{8}\right)}$$
where the $N!$ part accounts for the fact that the particles are indistinguishable from each other, and $A_{N,\beta}$ removes the self-energy of the average plasma, that is, the self-energy of a disk of radius $R = \sqrt N$ and charge density $\frac{1}{\pi}$. Thus, $Z_N^{D_R, \mathrm{OCP}}(\beta)$ is the partition function of a "charge neutral" OCP.

The log-partition function satisfies
$$-\ln Z_N^{D_R, \mathrm{OCP}}(\beta)\Big|_{\beta=2}=N \beta f(\beta)\Big|_{\beta=2}+\frac{1}{12} \ln N-\zeta^{\prime}(-1)-\frac{1}{720 N^2}+O\left(\frac{1}{N^4}\right)$$
where $\beta f(\beta)\Big|_{\beta=2}=\frac{1}{2} \log \left(\frac{1}{2 \pi^3}\right)$ is the average free energy per particle at the $N \to \infty$ limit. It is conjectured that for general $\beta$,
$$-\ln Z_N^{D_R, \mathrm{OCP}}(\beta)=N \beta f(\beta)\Big|_{\beta=2} + \frac{4 \log (\beta / 2)}{3 \pi^{1 / 2}} \sqrt N + \frac{1}{12} \ln N + O(1)$$

== Large deviation theory ==
Let $G_n$ be sampled from the real or complex ensemble, and let $\rho(G_n)$ be the absolute value of its maximal eigenvalue:
$$\rho(G_n) := \max_j |\lambda_j|$$
We have the following theorem for the edge statistics:

Edge statistics of the Ginibre ensemble—For $G_n$ and $\rho\left(G_n\right)$ as above, with probability one,
$$\lim _{n \rightarrow \infty} \frac{1}{\sqrt{n}} \rho\left(G_n\right)=1$$

Moreover, let $\gamma_n=\log \left(\frac{n}{2 \pi}\right)-2 \log (\log (n))$, then $\sqrt{4 n \gamma_n}\left(\frac{1}{\sqrt{n}} \rho\left(G_n\right)-1-\sqrt{\frac{\gamma_n}{4 n}}\right),$ converges in distribution to the Gumbel law, i.e., the probability measure on $\mathbb{R}$ with cumulative distribution function $F_{\mathrm{Gum}}(x)=e^{-e^{-x}}$.

Furthermore, for any $M, \delta > 0$, almost surely $\frac{1}{\sqrt n} \rho(G_n) \in 1 + \frac{1}{\sqrt n} [M, (2 + \delta) \sqrt{\ln n}]$ for all large $n$.

The theorem still holds for quaternionic non-Hermitian matrix ensembles, with $e^{-e^{-x}}$ replaced by $e^{-\sqrt 2 e^{-x}}$.

This theorem refines the circular law of the Ginibre ensemble. In words, the circular law says that the spectrum of $\frac{1}{\sqrt{n}} G_n$ almost surely falls uniformly on the unit disc. and the edge statistics theorem states that the radius of the almost-unit-disk is about $1 + \sqrt{\frac{\gamma_n}{4 n}} + \frac{1}{\sqrt{4 n \gamma_n}} z$, where $z$ is a random variable sampled from the standard Gumbel distribution.

== History ==
For random matrices with Gaussian distribution of entries (the Ginibre ensembles), the circular law was established in the 1960s by Jean Ginibre. In the 1980s, Vyacheslav Girko introduced an approach which allowed to establish the circular law for more general distributions. Further progress was made by Zhidong Bai, who established the circular law under certain smoothness assumptions on the distribution.

The assumptions were further relaxed in the works of Terence Tao and Van H. Vu, Guangming Pan and Wang Zhou, and Friedrich Götze and Alexander Tikhomirov. Finally, in 2010 Tao and Vu proved the circular law under the minimal assumptions stated above.

The circular law result was extended in 1985 by Girko to an elliptical law for ensembles of matrices with a fixed amount of correlation between the entries above and below the diagonal. The elliptic and circular laws were further generalized by Aceituno, Rogers and Schomerus to the hypotrochoid law which includes higher order correlations.

== See also ==
- Wigner semicircle distribution
