= Monique Combescure =

French mathematical physicist

- Born: Monique Moulin; 23 April 1950 (age 76)
- Education: École Normale Supérieure; Paris-Sud University
- Occupation: Mathematical physicist
- Known for: Legion of Honor; Irène Joliot-Curie Prize, 2007

Monique Combescure (born 23 April 1950, née Moulin), is a French physicist specializing in mathematical physics. In 2001, she became director of research at the Lyon Institute of Nuclear Physics. From 2000 to 2008, she was director of the European Mathematics and Quantum Physics Research Group (GDRE MPhiQ) which aims to promote synergy between theoretical physicists and mathematicians in the field of quantum physics. She received the Irène-Joliot-Curie Prize in 2007 and the rank of Officer of the National Order of Merit in 2011.

== Life and work ==
In 1970, Combescure joined the École Normale Supérieure in Paris and decided to devote herself to research in theoretical physics. She defended her thesis at the University of Paris-Sud in 1974 on the problem of 3-body quantum scattering under the supervision of Jean Ginibre. She was then assigned to the theoretical and high-energy physics laboratory at Orsay. In 1979 she obtained her doctorate on many-body spectral and scattering problems in quantum mechanics and field theory. She is a member of the scientific council of the University of Paris-Sud, in particular in the third cycle pedagogy commission (theses and authorizations to direct research).

She has been elected to many research administration bodies, in particular to the Scientific Council of the Mathematics Physics Particles Universe department of the French National Centre for Scientific Research (CNRS).

As the Director of the GDRE MPhiQ European Research Group titled Mathematics and Quantum Physics, she brought together 150 researchers and teacher-researchers working in mathematics or theoretical physics laboratories to explore topical subjects posed by quantum mechanics and field theory.

== Awards ==
Combescure has received several distinctions.

- 1997: Ernest Dechelle Prize from the French Academy of Sciences
- 2007: Irène-Joliot-Curie prize for woman scientist of the year
- 2008: Chevalier of the Legion of Honor
- 2011: Officer of the National Order of Merit

== Selected publications ==
- Combescure, M. (1986). A quantum particle in a quadrupole radio-frequency trap. In Annales de l'IHP Physique théorique (Vol. 44, No. 3, pp. 293–314).
- Combescure, M., & Robert, D. (1997). Semiclassical spreading of quantum wave packets and applications near unstable fixed points of the classical flow. Asymptotic Analysis, 14(4), 377–404.
- Combescure, M., Ralston, J., & Robert, D. (1999). A proof of the Gutzwiller semiclassical trace formula using coherent states decomposition. Communications in mathematical physics, 202(2), 463–480.
- Combescure, M., Gieres, F., & Kibler, M. (2004). Are N= 1 and N= 2 supersymmetric quantum mechanics equivalent?. Journal of Physics A: Mathematical and General, 37(43), 10385.
- Combescure, M. (2009). Block-circulant matrices with circulant blocks, Weil sums, and mutually unbiased bases. II. The prime power case. Journal of mathematical physics, 50(3), 032104.
