= Harry Kesten =

American mathematician (1931–2019)

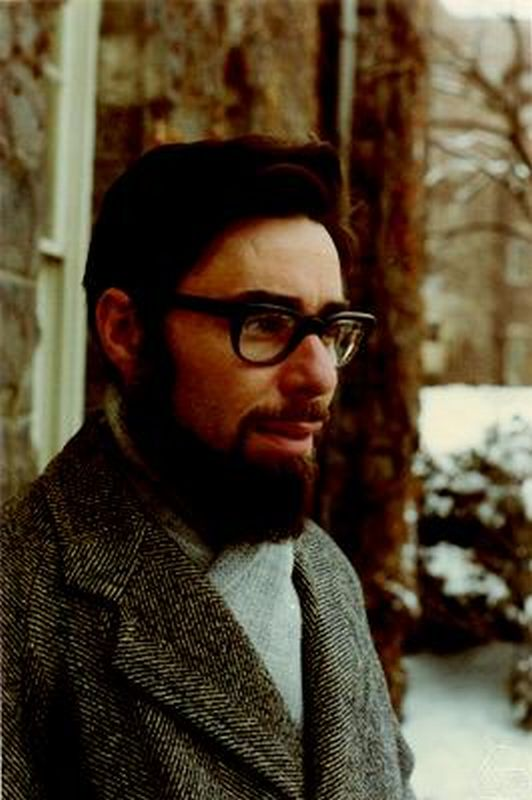
- Harry Kesten at Cornell University, 1970
- Born: Harry Kesten; November 19, 1931; Duisburg, Germany
- Died: March 29, 2019 (aged 87); Ithaca, New York, United States
- Education: Cornell University
- Known for: Van den Berg–Kesten inequality
- Spouse: Doraline Kesten
- Children: 1
- Awards: Guggenheim Fellow (1972); Alfred P. Sloan Fellow (1963); Brouwer Medal (1981); Wald Memorial Lecturer, Institute of Mathematical Statistics (1986); George Pólya Prize from the SIAM (1994); Steele Prize for Lifetime Achievement from the AMS (2001); Member of National Academy of Sciences (1983); Correspondent Member of the Royal Netherlands Academy of Arts and Sciences.; Docteur Honoris Causa, Université Paris-Sud 11 (2007); Fellow, American Mathematical Society (2013).
- Scientific career
- Fields: Mathematics; Probability; Mathematical analysis; Statistical mechanics; Geometric group theory
- Workplaces: Cornell University; Hebrew University; Princeton University
- Thesis: Symmetric Random Walks on Groups (1958)
- Doctoral advisor: Mark Kac
- Doctoral students: Maury Bramson

Harry Kesten (November 19, 1931 – March 29, 2019) was a Jewish American mathematician best known for his work in probability, most notably on random walks on groups and graphs, random matrices, branching processes, and percolation theory.

== Biography ==
Harry Kesten was born in Duisburg, Germany in 1931, and grew up in the Netherlands, where he moved with his parents in 1933 to escape the Nazis. Surviving the Holocaust, Kesten initially studied chemistry, and later theoretical physics and mathematics, at the University of Amsterdam. He moved to the United States in 1956 and received his PhD in mathematics in 1958 at Cornell University under the supervision of Mark Kac. He was an instructor at Princeton University and the Hebrew University before returning to Cornell in 1961.

Kesten died on March 29, 2019, in Ithaca at the age of 87.

== Mathematical work ==
Kesten's work includes many fundamental contributions across almost the whole of probability, including the following highlights.

- Random walks on groups. In his 1958 PhD thesis, Kesten studied symmetric random walks on countable groups G generated by a jump distribution with support G. He showed that the spectral radius equals the exponential decay rate of the return probabilities. He showed later that this is strictly less than 1 if and only if the group is non-amenable. The last result is known as Kesten's criterion for amenability. He calculated the spectral radius of the d-regular tree, namely $\frac{2\sqrt{d-1}}{d}$.
- Products of random matrices. Let $Y_n=X_1 X_2\cdots X_n$ be the product of the first n elements of an ergodic stationary sequence of random $k \times k$ matrices. With Furstenberg in 1960, Kesten showed the convergence of $n^{-1}\log^+\|Y_n\|$, under the condition $E (\log^+\|X_1\|)<\infty$.
- Self-avoiding walks. Kesten's ratio limit theorem states that the number $\sigma_n$ of n-step self-avoiding walks from the origin on the integer lattice satisfies $\sigma_{n+2}/\sigma_n \to \mu^2$ where $\mu$ is the connective constant. This result remains unimproved despite much effort. In his proof, Kesten proved his pattern theorem, which states that, for a proper internal pattern P, there exists $\alpha$ such that the proportion of walks containing fewer than $\alpha n$ copies of P is exponentially smaller than $\sigma_n$.
- Branching processes. Kesten and Stigum showed that the correct condition for the convergence of the population size, normalized by its mean, is that $E(L\log^+ L)<\infty$ where L is a typical family size. With Ney and Spitzer, Kesten found the minimal conditions for the asymptotic distributional properties of a critical branching process, as discovered earlier, but subject to stronger assumptions, by Kolmogorov and Yaglom.
- Random walk in a random environment. With Kozlov and Spitzer, Kesten proved a deep theorem about random walk in a one-dimensional random environment. They established the limit laws for the walk across the variety of situations that can arise within the environment.
- Diophantine approximation. In 1966, Kesten resolved a conjecture of Erdős and Szűsz on the discrepancy of irrational rotations. He studied the discrepancy between the number of rotations by $\xi$ hitting a given interval I, and the length of I, and proved this bounded if and only if the length of I is a multiple of $\xi$.
- Diffusion-limited aggregation. Kesten proved that the growth rate of the arms in d dimensions can be no larger than $n^{2/(d+1)}$.
- Percolation. Kesten's most famous work in this area is his proof that the critical probability of bond percolation on the square lattice equals 1/2. He followed this with a systematic study of percolation in two dimensions, reported in his book Percolation Theory for Mathematicians. His work on scaling theory and scaling relations has since proved key to the relationship between critical percolation and Schramm–Loewner evolution.
- First passage percolation. Kesten's results for this growth model are largely summarized in Aspects of First Passage Percolation. He studied the rate of convergence to the time constant, and contributed to the topics of subadditive stochastic processes and concentration of measure. He developed the problem of maximum flow through a medium subject to random capacities.

A volume of papers was published in Kesten's honor in 1999. The Kesten memorial volume of Probability Theory and Related Fields contains a full list of the dedicatee's publications.

with Rudolf Peierls and Roland Dobrushin in Oxford, 1993

== Selected works ==
- with Mark Kac: Kac, M.; Kesten, Harry (1958). "On rapidly mixing transformations and an application to continued fractions". Bull. Amer. Math. Soc. 64 (5): 283–287. doi:10.1090/s0002-9904-1958-10226-8. MR 0097114; correction 65 1958 p. 67
- Kesten, Harry (1959). "Symmetric random walks on groups". Trans. Amer. Math. Soc. 92 (2): 336–354. doi:10.1090/s0002-9947-1959-0109367-6. MR 0109367.
- Kesten, Harry (1962). "Occupation times for Markov and semi-Markov chains". Trans. Amer. Math. Soc. 103: 82–112. doi:10.1090/s0002-9947-1962-0138122-6. hdl:2027/mdp.39015095249648. MR 0138122.
- Kesten, Harry (1962). "Some probabilistic theorems on Diophantine approximations". Trans. Amer. Math. Soc. 103 (2): 189–217. doi:10.1090/s0002-9947-1962-0137692-1. MR 0137692.
- with Zbigniew Ciesielski: "A limit theorem for the fractional parts of the sequence {2^{k}t}". Proc. Amer. Math. Soc. 13: 596–600. 1962. doi:10.1090/s0002-9939-1962-0138612-1. MR 0138612.
- with Don Ornstein and Frank Spitzer: Kesten, H.; Ornstein, D.; Spitzer, F. (1962). "A general property of random walk". Bull. Amer. Math. Soc. 68 (5): 526–528. doi:10.1090/s0002-9904-1962-10808-8 (inactive September 13, 2025). MR 0142160.
- Kesten, Harry (1969). "A convolution equation and hitting probabilities of single points for processes with stationary independent increments". Bull. Amer. Math. Soc. 75 (3): 573–578. doi:10.1090/s0002-9904-1969-12245-7 (inactive September 13, 2025). MR 0251797.
- Kesten, Harry (1971). "Some linear stochastic growth models". Bull. Amer. Math. Soc. 77 (4): 492–511. doi:10.1090/s0002-9904-1971-12732-5. MR 0278404.
- Hitting probabilities for single points for processes of stationary independent increments (PDF). Memoirs of the AMS; 93. Providence, R.I.: AMS. 1969.
- Kesten, Harry (1975). "Sums of stationary sequences cannot grow slower than linearly". Proc. Amer. Math. Soc. 49: 205–211. doi:10.1090/s0002-9939-1975-0370713-4. MR 0370713.
- "Erickson's conjecture on the rate of d-dimensional random walk". Trans. Amer. Math. Soc. 240: 65–113. 1978. doi:10.1090/s0002-9947-1978-0489585-x. MR 0489585.
- Percolation theory for mathematicians. Stuttgart: Birkhäuser. 1982. ISBN 3-7643-3107-0. Archived from the original on June 14, 2018.
- Kesten, Harry (1987). "Percolation theory and first-passage percolation". Ann. Probab. 15 (4): 1231–1271. doi:10.1214/aop/1176991975.
- "What is Percolation?" (PDF). Notices of the AMS. 2006.
- with Geoffrey Grimmett: Percolation at Saint-Flour. Probability at Saint-Flour. Heidelberg: Springer. 2012. doi:10.1007/BFb0092620.

== See also ==
- Amenable group
- Percolation theory
