= Coulomb gas =

Many-body of charged particles

In statistical physics, a Coulomb gas is a many-body system of charged particles interacting under the electrostatic force. It is named after Charles-Augustin de Coulomb, as the force by which the particles interact is also known as the Coulomb force.

The system can be defined in any number of dimensions. While the three-dimensional Coulomb gas is the most experimentally realistic, the best understood is the two-dimensional Coulomb gas. The two-dimensional Coulomb gas is known to be equivalent to the continuum XY model of magnets and the sine-Gordon model (upon taking certain limits) in a physical sense, in that physical observables (correlation functions) calculated in one model can be used to calculate physical observables in another model. This aided the understanding of the BKT transition, and the discoverers earned a Nobel Prize in Physics for their work on this phase transition.

== Formulation ==
Define the function (Coulomb kernel, or Riesz kernel)
$$\begin{align}
g_s(x) =
\begin{cases}-\log|x| & \text{ if } s = 0, \\
\frac{1}{s|x|^{s}} & \text{ if } s \neq 0
\end{cases}
\end{align}$$
The setup starts with considering $N$ charged particles in $\mathbb{R}^d$ with positions $\mathbf{r}_i$ and charges $q_i$. From electrostatics, the pairwise potential energy between particles labelled by indices $i,j$ is (up to scale factor)
$$V_{ij} = q_iq_jg_{d-2}(|\mathbf{r}_i - \mathbf{r}_j|),$$
where $g_{d-2}(x)$ is the Coulomb kernel or Green's function of the Laplace equation in $d$ dimensions. The free energy due to these interactions is then (proportional to) $F = \sum_{i \neq j} V_{ij}$, and the partition function is given by integrating over different configurations, that is, the positions of the charged particles.

More generally, any choice of $s \in [d-2, d)$ makes sense. This general case is called Riesz gas, of which the Coulomb gas is a special case. The naming comes from the fact that the Riesz kernel is the Green's function of the fractional Laplacian, which can be defined using the Riesz potential. Specifically,
$$(-\Delta)^{\frac{d-s}2} g_s = c_{d, s} \delta_0$$
where
$$c_{d, s} = \begin{cases}\frac{2^{d-s} \pi^{d / 2} \Gamma\left(\frac{d-s}{2}\right)}{\Gamma\left(\frac{s}{2}\right)} & \text { for } s>\max (0, d-2) \\ \frac{2 \pi^{d / 2}}{\Gamma\left(\frac{d}{2}\right)}=\left|\mathbb{S}^{d-1}\right| & \text { if } s=d-2>0 \\ 2 \pi & \text { if } s=0, d=1 \text { or } d=2\end{cases}$$

== Names ==
When there is only one type of charge (conventionally assumed positive), it is called a one-component plasma. Sometimes there is an additional background charge distribution that cancels out the charge on average. For example, in the case of the Ginibre ensemble, the background charge would be the uniform distribution on the unit disk. With such a neutralizing background, it is called a jellium.

When $d = 2, s = 0$, i is called a log gas, two-dimensional one-component plasma (2DOCP), two-dimensional jellium, or Dyson gas.

== Coulomb gas in conformal field theory ==
The two-dimensional Coulomb gas can be used as a framework for describing fields in minimal models. This comes from the similarity of the two-point correlation function of the free boson $\varphi$,
$$\langle \varphi(z, \bar z) \varphi(w, \bar w) \rangle = - \log|z - w|^2$$
to the electric potential energy between two unit charges in two dimensions.

== See also ==
- Sine-Gordon equation
- XY model
