= Oded Schramm =

Israeli mathematician

- עודד שרם
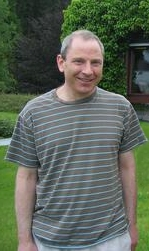
- Schramm in 2008
- Born: December 10, 1961; Jerusalem, Israel
- Died: September 1, 2008 (aged 46); Washington, US
- Citizenship: Israeli and US
- Education: Hebrew University of Jerusalem; Princeton University
- Known for: Schramm–Loewner evolution; Circle packing
- Awards: Erdős Prize (1996); Salem Prize (2001); Clay Research Award (2002); Loève Prize (2003); Henri Poincaré Prize (2003); George Pólya Prize (2006); Ostrowski Prize (2007)
- Scientific career
- Workplaces: University of California, San Diego; Weizmann Institute; Microsoft Research
- Doctoral advisor: William Thurston

Oded Schramm (Hebrew: עודד שרם; December 10, 1961 – September 1, 2008) was an Israeli-American mathematician known for the invention of the Schramm–Loewner evolution (SLE) and for working at the intersection of conformal field theory and probability theory.

== Biography ==
Schramm was born in Jerusalem. His father, Michael Schramm, was a biochemistry professor at the Hebrew University of Jerusalem.

He attended Hebrew University, where he received his bachelor's degree in mathematics and computer science in 1986 and his master's degree in 1987, under the supervision of Gil Kalai. He then received his PhD from Princeton University in 1990 under the supervision of William Thurston.

After receiving his doctorate, he worked for two years at the University of California, San Diego, and then had a permanent position at the Weizmann Institute from 1992 to 1999. In 1999 he moved to the Theory Group at Microsoft Research in Redmond, Washington, where he remained for the rest of his life.

He and his wife had two children, Tselil and Pele. Tselil is an assistant professor of statistics at Stanford University.

On September 1, 2008, Schramm fell to his death while scrambling Guye Peak, north of Snoqualmie Pass in Washington.

== Research ==
Illustration by Schramm of an approximate conformal map using the circle packing theorem.

A constant theme in Schramm's research was the exploration of relations between discrete models and their continuous scaling limits, which for a number of models turn out to be conformally invariant.

Schramm's most significant contribution was the invention of Schramm–Loewner evolution, a tool which has paved the way for mathematical proofs of conjectured scaling limit relations on models from statistical mechanics such as self-avoiding random walk and percolation. This technique has had a profound impact on the field. It has been recognized by many awards to Schramm and others, including a Fields Medal to Wendelin Werner, who was one of Schramm's principal collaborators, along with Gregory Lawler. The New York Times wrote in his obituary:

If Dr. Schramm had been born three weeks and a day later, he would almost certainly have been one of the winners of the Fields Medal, perhaps the highest honor in mathematics, in 2002.

Schramm's doctorate was in complex analysis, but he made contributions in many other areas of pure mathematics, although self-taught in those areas. Frequently he would prove a result by himself before reading the literature to obtain an appropriate credit. Often his proof was original or more elegant than the original.

Besides conformally invariant planar processes and SLE, he made fundamental contributions to several topics:

- The circle packing theorem and discrete conformal geometry.
- Embeddings of Gromov hyperbolic spaces.
- Percolation, uniform and minimal spanning trees and forests, harmonic functions on Cayley graphs of infinite finitely generated groups (especially non-amenable groups) and the hyperbolic plane.
- Limits of sequences of finite graphs.
- Noise sensitivity of Boolean functions, with applications to dynamical percolation.
- Random turn games (e.g. random turn hex) and the infinity Laplacian equation.
- Random permutations.

== Awards and honors ==
- Erdős Prize (1996)
- Salem Prize (2001)
- Clay Research Award (2002), for his work in combining analytic power with geometric insight in the field of random walks, percolation, and probability theory in general, especially for formulating stochastic Loewner evolution. His work opens new doors and reinvigorates research in these fields.
- Loève Prize (2003)
- Henri Poincaré Prize (2003), For his contributions to discrete conformal geometry, where he discovered new classes of circle patterns described by integrable systems and proved the ultimate results on convergence to the corresponding conformal mappings, and for the discovery of the Stochastic Loewner Process as a candidate for scaling limits in two dimensional statistical mechanics.
- SIAM George Pólya Prize (2006), with Gregory Lawler and Wendelin Werner, for groundbreaking work on the development and application of stochastic Loewner evolution (SLE). Of particular note is the rigorous establishment of the existence and conformal invariance of critical scaling limits of a number of 2D lattice models arising in statistical physics.
- Ostrowski Prize (2007)
- Elected in 2008 as a foreign member of the Royal Swedish Academy of Sciences.

== Selected publications ==
- Schramm, Oded (2000), "Scaling limits of loop-erased random walks and uniform spanning trees", Israel Journal of Mathematics, 118: 221–288, arXiv:math.PR/9904022, doi:10.1007/BF02803524, MR 1776084, S2CID 17164604. Schramm's paper introducing the Schramm–Loewner evolution.
- Schramm, Oded (2007), "Conformally invariant scaling limits: an overview and a collection of problems", International Congress of Mathematicians. Vol. I, vol. 1, Eur. Math. Soc., Zürich, pp. 513–543, arXiv:math/0602151, Bibcode:2006math......2151S, doi:10.4171/022-1/20, ISBN 978-3-03719-022-7, MR 2334202
- Benjamini, Itai; Häggström, Olle, eds. (2011), Selected works of Oded Schramm, Selected Works in Probability and Statistics, New York: Springer, doi:10.1007/978-1-4419-9675-6, ISBN 978-1-4419-9674-9, MR 2885266
