= Schramm–Loewner evolution =

Concept in probability theory

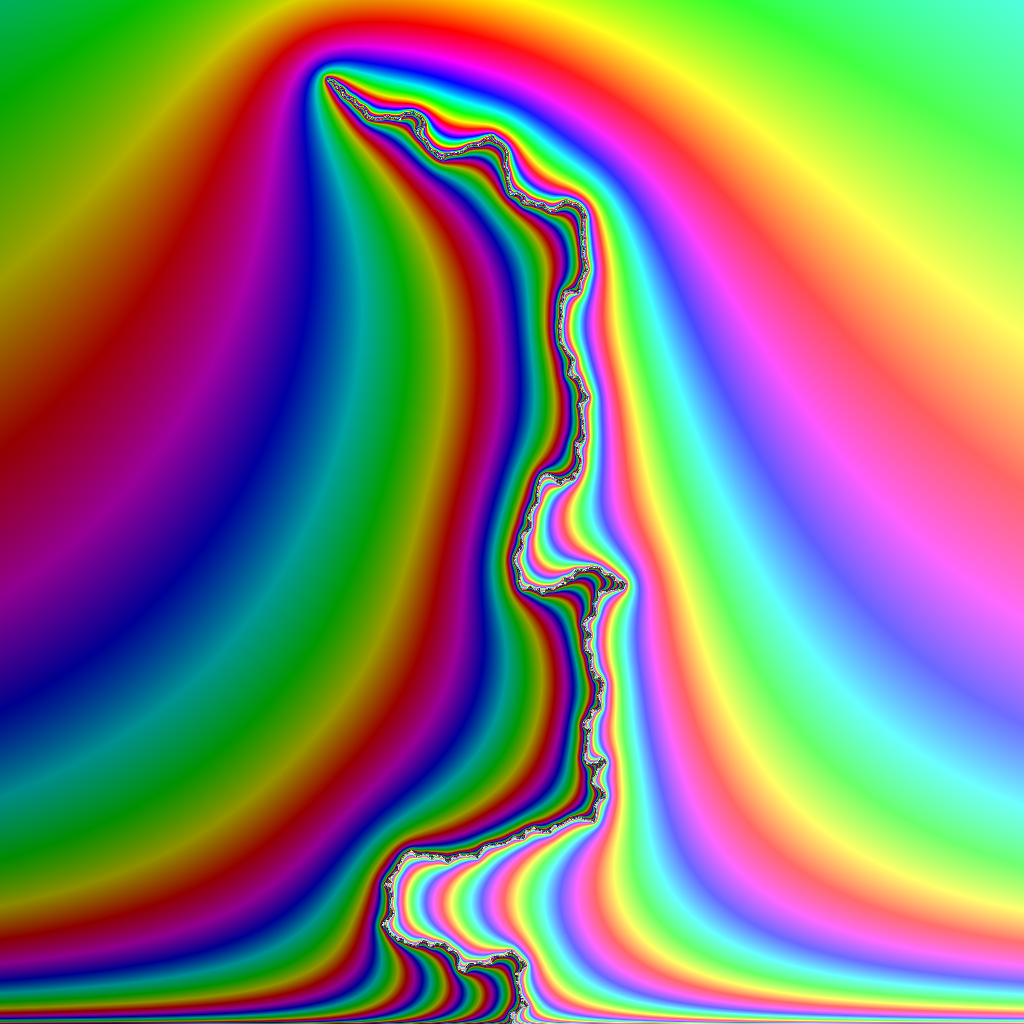
Schramm–Loewner evolution on the upper half plane with hue indicating $\log(\operatorname{Im}(g_t(z)))$

In probability theory, the Schramm–Loewner evolution with parameter κ, also known as stochastic Loewner evolution (SLE_{κ}), is a family of random planar curves that have been proven to be the scaling limit of a variety of two-dimensional lattice models in statistical mechanics. Given a parameter κ and a domain U in the complex plane, it gives a family of random curves in U, with κ controlling how much the curve turns. There are two main variants of SLE, chordal SLE which gives a family of random curves from two fixed boundary points, and radial SLE, which gives a family of random curves from a fixed boundary point to a fixed interior point. These curves are defined to satisfy conformal invariance and a domain Markov property.

It was discovered by Oded Schramm (2000) as a conjectured scaling limit of the planar uniform spanning tree (UST) and the planar loop-erased random walk (LERW) probabilistic processes, and developed by him together with Greg Lawler and Wendelin Werner in a series of joint papers.

Besides UST and LERW, the Schramm–Loewner evolution is conjectured or proven to describe the scaling limit of various stochastic processes in the plane, such as critical percolation, the critical Ising model, the double-dimer model, self-avoiding walks, and other critical statistical mechanics models that exhibit conformal invariance. The SLE curves are the scaling limits of interfaces and other non-self-intersecting random curves in these models. The main idea is that the conformal invariance and a certain Markov property inherent in such stochastic processes together make it possible to encode these planar curves into a one-dimensional Brownian motion running on the boundary of the domain (the driving function in Loewner's differential equation). This way, many important questions about the planar models can be translated into exercises in Itô calculus. Indeed, several mathematically non-rigorous predictions made by physicists using conformal field theory have been proven using this strategy.

== The Loewner equation ==
If $D$ is a simply connected, open complex domain not equal to $\mathbb{C}$, and $\gamma$ is a simple curve in $D$ starting on the boundary (a continuous function with $\gamma(0)$ on the boundary of $D$ and $\gamma((0,\infty))$ a subset of $D$), then for each $t\geq 0$, the complement $D_t = D\smallsetminus\gamma([0,t])$ of $\gamma([0,t])$ is simply connected and therefore conformally isomorphic to $D$ by the Riemann mapping theorem. If $f_t$ is a suitable normalized isomorphism from $D$ to $D_t$, then it satisfies a differential equation found by Loewner (1923, p. 121) in his work on the Bieberbach conjecture. Sometimes it is more convenient to use the inverse function $g_t$ of $f_t$, which is a conformal mapping from $D_t$ to $D$.

In Loewner's equation, $z\in D$, $t\geq 0$, and the boundary values at time $t=0$ are $f_0(z)=z$ or $g_0(z)=z$. The equation depends on a driving function $\zeta(t)$ taking values in the boundary of $D$. If $D$ is the unit disk and the curve $\gamma$ is parameterized by "capacity", then Loewner's equation is

$\frac{\partial f_t(z)}{\partial t} = -z f^\prime_t(z)\frac{\zeta(t)+z}{\zeta(t)-z}$ or $\dfrac{\partial g_t(z)}{\partial t} = g_t(z)\dfrac{\zeta(t)+g_t(z)}{\zeta(t)-g_t(z)}.$

When $D$ is the upper half plane the Loewner equation differs from this by changes of variable and is

$\frac{\partial f_t(z)}{\partial t} = \frac{ 2f_t^\prime(z)}{\zeta(t)-z}$ or $\dfrac{\partial g_t(z)}{\partial t} = \dfrac{2}{g_t(z)-\zeta(t)}.$

The driving function $\zeta$ and the curve $\gamma$ are related by

$$f_t(\zeta(t)) = \gamma(t) \text{ or } \zeta(t) = g_t(\gamma(t))$$

where $f_t$ and $g_t$ are extended by continuity.

=== Example ===
Let $D$ be the upper half plane and consider an SLE_{0}, so the driving function $\zeta$ is a Brownian motion of diffusivity zero. The function $\zeta$ is thus identically zero almost surely and

$$f_t(z) = \sqrt{z^2-4t}$$
$$g_t(z) = \sqrt{z^2+4t}$$
$$\gamma(t) = 2i\sqrt{t}$$
$D_t$ is the upper half-plane with the line from 0 to $2i\sqrt{t}$ removed. Here $\sqrt{}$ is the square root with values in the upper half-plane.

== Schramm–Loewner evolution ==
Schramm–Loewner evolution is the random curve γ given by the Loewner equation as in the previous section, for the driving function

$$\zeta(t)=\sqrt{\kappa}B(t)$$

where B(t) is Brownian motion on the boundary of D, scaled by some real κ. In other words, Schramm–Loewner evolution is a probability measure on planar curves, given as the image of Wiener measure under this map.

In general the curve γ need not be simple, and the domain D_{t} is not the complement of γ([0,t]) in D, but is instead the unbounded component of the complement.

There are two versions of SLE, using two families of curves, each depending on a non-negative real parameter κ:

- Chordal SLE_{κ}, which is related to curves connecting two points on the boundary of a domain (usually the upper half plane, with the points being 0 and infinity).
- Radial SLE_{κ}, which is related to curves joining a point on the boundary of a domain to a point in the interior (often curves joining 1 and 0 in the unit disk).

SLE depends on a choice of Brownian motion on the boundary of the domain, and there are several variations depending on what sort of Brownian motion is used: for example it might start at a fixed point, or start at a uniformly distributed point on the unit circle, or might have a built in drift, and so on. The parameter κ controls the rate of diffusion of the Brownian motion, and the behavior of SLE depends critically on its value.

The two domains most commonly used in Schramm–Loewner evolution are the upper half plane and the unit disk. Although the Loewner differential equation in these two cases look different, they are equivalent up to changes of variables as the unit disk and the upper half plane are conformally equivalent. However a conformal equivalence between them does not preserve the Brownian motion on their boundaries used to drive Schramm–Loewner evolution.

== Schramm-Loewner evolution and percolation ==
De Castro et al. observed that the two-dimensional percolation problem can be viewed as occurring in a landscape with long-range height-height correlations determined by the Hurst exponent H, and the outer perimeter of the percolation cluster for correlated surfaces turns out to be statistically equivalent to the SLE curves for H∈[-1,0].

However, de Castro et al. do not provide an explicit expression for κ in terms of H. In the work of Ivan Gordeev and Elizabeth Sosnovskaya (Orlova), it is shown that the dependence of the SLE parameter κ on the Hurst exponent H can be easily derived:

$$\kappa = \begin{cases} 4-{8 \over 3}H, & \text{for }H\in[-{3 \over 4},0] \\ 6, & \text{for }H\in[-1, -{3 \over 4}] \end{cases}.$$

== Special values of κ ==
- For 0 ≤ κ < 4 the curve γ(t) is simple (with probability 1).
- For 4 < κ < 8 the curve γ(t) intersects itself and every point is contained in a loop but the curve is not space-filling (with probability 1).
- For κ ≥ 8 the curve γ(t) is space-filling (with probability 1).
- κ = 2 corresponds to the loop-erased random walk, or equivalently, branches of the uniform spanning tree.
- For κ = 8/3, SLE_{κ} has the restriction property and is conjectured to be the scaling limit of self-avoiding random walks. A version of it is the outer boundary of Brownian motion.
- κ = 3 is the limit of interfaces for the Ising model.
- κ = 4 corresponds to the path of the harmonic explorer and contour lines of the Gaussian free field.
- Percolation interface: Make a lozenge of equally sized hexagons in the plane. Color its upper and left side with black, and the lower and right side with white. Then color the other hexagons “white” or “black” independently with equal probability 1/2. There is a boundary between the black and the white, running from bottom left to top right. The scaling limit of the boundary is κ = 6.
- For κ = 6, SLE_{κ} has the locality property. This arises in the scaling limit of critical percolation on the triangular lattice and conjecturally on other lattices.
- κ = 8 corresponds to the path separating the uniform spanning tree from its dual tree.

When SLE corresponds to some conformal field theory, the parameter κ is related to the central charge c of the conformal field theory by

$$c = \frac{(8-3\kappa)(\kappa-6)}{2\kappa}.$$

Each value of c < 1 corresponds to two values of κ, one value κ between 0 and 4, and a "dual" value 16/κ greater than 4. (see Bauer & Bernard (2002a) Bauer & Bernard (2002b))

Beffara (2008) showed that the Hausdorff dimension of the paths (with probability 1) is equal to min(2, 1 + κ/8).

== Left passage probability formulas for SLE_{κ} ==
The probability of chordal SLE_{κ} γ being on the left of fixed point $x_{0}+iy_{0}=z_{0}\in \mathbb{H}$ was computed by Schramm (2001a)

$$\mathbb{P}[\gamma \text{ passes to the left } z_0]=\frac{1}{2}+\frac{\Gamma(\frac{4}{\kappa})}{\sqrt{\pi} \, \Gamma(\frac{8-\kappa}{2\kappa})}\frac{x_0}{y_0} \, _2F_1 \left(\frac{1}{2},\frac{4}{\kappa}, \frac{3}{2}, - \left(\frac{x_0}{y_0}\right)^2 \right)$$

where $\Gamma$ is the Gamma function and $_2F_{1}(a,b,c,d)$ is the hypergeometric function. This was derived by using the martingale property of

$$h(x,y):=\mathbb{P}[\gamma \text{ passes to the left } x+iy]$$

and Itô's lemma to obtain the following partial differential equation for $w:=\tfrac{x}{y}$

$$\frac{\kappa}{2}\partial_{ww}h(w)+\frac{4w}{w^2+1}\partial_w h=0.$$

For κ = 4, the RHS is $1-\tfrac{1}{\pi}\arg(z_0)$, which was used in the construction of the harmonic explorer, and for κ = 6, we obtain Cardy's formula, which was used by Smirnov to prove conformal invariance in percolation.

== Applications ==
Lawler, Schramm & Werner (2001b) used SLE_{6} to prove the conjecture of Mandelbrot (1982) that the boundary of planar Brownian motion has fractal dimension 4/3.

Critical percolation on the triangular lattice was proved to be related to SLE_{6} by Stanislav Smirnov. Combined with earlier work of Harry Kesten, this led to the determination of many of the critical exponents for percolation. This breakthrough, in turn, allowed further analysis of many aspects of this model.

Loop-erased random walk was shown to converge to SLE_{2} by Lawler, Schramm and Werner. This allowed derivation of many quantitative properties of loop-erased random walk (some of which were derived earlier by Richard Kenyon). The related random Peano curve outlining the uniform spanning tree was shown to converge to SLE_{8}.

Rohde and Schramm showed that κ is related to the fractal dimension of a curve by the following relation

$$d = 1 + \frac{\kappa}{8}.$$

== Simulation ==
Computer programs (Matlab) are presented in this GitHub repository to simulate Schramm Loewner Evolution planar curves.
