= Greg Lawler =

American mathematician (born 1955)

- Born: July 14, 1955 (age 71)
- Education: University of Virginia; Princeton University
- Awards: George Pólya Prize (2006); Wolf Prize (2019)
- Scientific career
- Fields: Mathematics
- Workplaces: University of Chicago; Cornell University; Duke University
- Doctoral advisor: Edward Nelson

Gregory Francis Lawler (born July 14, 1955) is an American mathematician working in probability theory and best known for his work since 2000 on the Schramm–Loewner evolution.

He received his PhD from Princeton University in 1979 under the supervision of Edward Nelson. He was on the faculty of Duke University from 1979 to 2001, of Cornell University from 2001 to 2006, and since 2006 is at the University of Chicago.

== Awards and honors ==
He received the 2006 SIAM George Pólya Prize with Oded Schramm and Wendelin Werner.

In 2019 he received the Wolf Prize in Mathematics.

Lawler is a member of the National Academy of Sciences (since 2013) and the American Academy of Arts and Sciences (since 2005). Since 2012, he has been a fellow of the American Mathematical Society. He gave an invited lecture at the International Congress of Mathematicians in Beijing (2002) and a plenary lecture at the ICM in Rio de Janeiro (2018).
