= FKG inequality =

Correlation inequality

In mathematics, the Fortuin–Kasteleyn–Ginibre (FKG) inequality is a correlation inequality, a fundamental tool in statistical mechanics and probabilistic combinatorics (especially random graphs and the probabilistic method), due to Cees M. Fortuin, Pieter W. Kasteleyn, and Jean Ginibre (1971). Informally, it says that in many random systems, increasing events are positively correlated, while an increasing and a decreasing event are negatively correlated. It was obtained by studying the random cluster model.

An earlier version, for the special case of i.i.d. variables, called Harris inequality, is due to Theodore Edward Harris (1960), see below. One generalization of the FKG inequality is the Holley inequality (1974) below, and an even further generalization is the Ahlswede–Daykin "four functions" theorem (1978). Furthermore, it has the same conclusion as the Griffiths inequalities, but the hypotheses are different.

== The inequality ==
Let $X$ be a finite distributive lattice, and μ a nonnegative function on it, that is assumed to satisfy the (FKG) lattice condition (sometimes a function satisfying this condition is called log supermodular) i.e.,

$$\mu(x\wedge y)\mu(x\vee y) \ge \mu(x)\mu(y)$$

for all x, y in the lattice $X$.

The FKG inequality then says that for any two monotonically increasing functions ƒ and g on $X$, the following positive correlation inequality holds:

$$\left(\sum _{x\in X}f(x)g(x)\mu(x)\right)\left(\sum _{x\in X}\mu(x)\right) \ge \left(\sum _{x\in X}f(x)\mu(x)\right)\left(\sum _{x\in X}g(x)\mu(x)\right).$$

The same inequality (positive correlation) is true when both ƒ and g are decreasing. If one is increasing and the other is decreasing, then they are negatively correlated and the above inequality is reversed.

Similar statements hold more generally, including when the set underlying $X$ is not necessarily finite or countable (though it must be bounded and totally ordered). In that case, μ has to be a finite measure, and the lattice condition has to be defined using cylinder events; see, e.g., Section 2.2 of Grimmett (1999).

For proofs, see Fortuin, Kasteleyn & Ginibre (1971) or the Ahlswede–Daykin inequality (1978). Also, a rough sketch is given below, due to Holley (1974), using a Markov chain coupling argument.

== Variations on terminology ==
The lattice condition for μ is also called multivariate total positivity, and sometimes the strong FKG condition; the term (multiplicative) FKG condition is also used in older literature.

The property of μ that increasing functions are positively correlated is also called having positive associations, or the weak FKG condition.

Thus, the FKG theorem can be rephrased as "the strong FKG condition implies the weak FKG condition".

== A special case: the Harris inequality ==
If the lattice $X$ is totally ordered, then the lattice condition is satisfied trivially for any measure μ. In case the measure μ is uniform, the FKG inequality is Chebyshev's sum inequality: if the two increasing functions take on values $a_1\leq a_2 \leq \cdots \leq a_n$ and $b_1\leq b_2 \leq \cdots \leq b_n$, then

$$\frac{a_1b_1+\cdots+a_nb_n}{n} \geq \frac{a_1+\cdots+a_n}{n} \; \frac{b_1+\cdots+b_n}{n}.$$

More generally, for any probability measure μ on $\R$ and increasing functions ƒ and g,

$$\int_\R f(x)g(x) \,d\mu(x) \geq \int_\R f(x)\,d\mu(x) \, \int_\R g(x)\,d\mu(x),$$

which follows immediately from

$$\int_\R\int_\R [f(x)-f(y)][g(x)-g(y)]\,d\mu(x)\,d\mu(y) \geq 0.$$

The lattice condition is trivially satisfied also when the lattice is the product of totally ordered lattices, $X=X_1\times\cdots\times X_n$, and $\mu=\mu_1\otimes\cdots\otimes\mu_n$ is a product measure. Often all the factors (both the lattices and the measures) are identical, i.e., μ is the probability distribution of i.i.d. random variables.

The FKG inequality for the case of a product measure is known also as the Harris inequality after Harris (Harris 1960), who found and used it in his study of percolation in the plane. A proof of the Harris inequality that uses the above double integral trick on $\R$ can be found, e.g., in Section 2.2 of Grimmett (1999).

=== Simple examples ===
A typical example is the following. Color each hexagon of the infinite honeycomb lattice black with probability $p$ and white with probability $1-p$, independently of each other. Let a, b, c, d be four hexagons, not necessarily distinct. Let $a \leftrightarrow b$ and $c\leftrightarrow d$ be the events that there is a black path from a to b, and a black path from c to d, respectively. Then the Harris inequality says that these events are positively correlated: $\Pr(a \leftrightarrow b,\ c\leftrightarrow d) \geq \Pr(a \leftrightarrow b)\Pr(c\leftrightarrow d)$. In other words, assuming the presence of one path can only increase the probability of the other.

Similarly, if we randomly color the hexagons inside an $n\times n$ rhombus-shaped hex board, then the events that there is black crossing from the left side of the board to the right side is positively correlated with having a black crossing from the top side to the bottom. On the other hand, having a left-to-right black crossing is negatively correlated with having a top-to-bottom white crossing, since the first is an increasing event (in the amount of blackness), while the second is decreasing. In fact, in any coloring of the hex board exactly one of these two events happen — this is why hex is a well-defined game.

In the Erdős–Rényi random graph, the existence of a Hamiltonian cycle is negatively correlated with the 3-colorability of the graph, since the first is an increasing event, while the latter is decreasing.

== Examples from statistical mechanics ==
In statistical mechanics, the usual source of measures that satisfy the lattice condition (and hence the FKG inequality) is the following:

If $S$ is an ordered set (such as $\{-1,+1\}$), and $\Gamma$ is a finite or infinite graph, then the set $S^\Gamma$ of $S$-valued configurations is a poset that is a distributive lattice.

Now, if $\Phi$ is a submodular potential (i.e., a family of functions

$$\Phi_\Lambda: S^\Lambda \longrightarrow \R\cup\{\infty\},$$

one for each finite $\Lambda \subset \Gamma$, such that each $\Phi_\Lambda$ is submodular), then one defines the corresponding Hamiltonians as

$$H_\Lambda(\varphi):=\sum_{\Delta\cap\Lambda\not=\emptyset} \Phi_\Delta(\varphi).$$

If μ is an extremal Gibbs measure for this Hamiltonian on the set of configurations $\varphi$, then it is easy to show that μ satisfies the lattice condition, see Sheffield (2005).

A key example is the Ising model on a graph $\Gamma$. Let $S=\{-1,+1\}$, called spins, and $\beta\in [0,\infty]$. Take the following potential:

$$\Phi_\Lambda(\varphi)=\begin{cases}
\beta 1_{\{\varphi(x)\not=\varphi(y)\}} & \text{if }\Lambda=\{x,y\}\text{ is a pair of adjacent vertices of }\Gamma;\\
0 & \text{otherwise.}\end{cases}$$

Submodularity is easy to check; intuitively, taking the min or the max of two configurations tends to decrease the number of disagreeing spins. Then, depending on the graph $\Gamma$ and the value of $\beta$, there could be one or more extremal Gibbs measures, see, e.g., Georgii, Häggström & Maes (2001) and Lyons (2000).

== A generalization: the Holley inequality ==
The Holley inequality, due to Richard Holley (1974), states that the expectations

$$\langle f\rangle_i = \frac{\sum _{x\in X}f(x)\mu_i(x)}{\sum_{x\in X}\mu_i(x)}$$

of a monotonically increasing function ƒ on a finite distributive lattice $X$ with respect to two positive functions μ_{1}, μ_{2} on the lattice satisfy the condition

$$\langle f\rangle_1 \ge \langle f\rangle_2,$$

provided the functions satisfy the Holley condition (criterion)

$$\mu_2(x\wedge y)\mu_1(x\vee y) \ge \mu_1(x)\mu_2(y)$$

for all x, y in the lattice.

To recover the FKG inequality: If μ satisfies the lattice condition and ƒ and g are increasing functions on $X$, then μ_{1}(x) = g(x)μ(x) and μ_{2}(x) = μ(x) will satisfy the lattice-type condition of the Holley inequality. Then the Holley inequality states that

$$\frac{ \langle fg\rangle_\mu }{\langle g\rangle_\mu} = \langle f\rangle_1 \ge \langle f\rangle_2 =\langle f\rangle_\mu,$$

which is just the FKG inequality.

As for FKG, the Holley inequality follows from the Ahlswede–Daykin inequality.

== Weakening the lattice condition: monotonicity ==
Consider the usual case of $X$ being a product $\R^V$ for some finite set $V$. The lattice condition on μ is easily seen to imply the following monotonicity, which has the virtue that it is often easier to check than the lattice condition:

Whenever one fixes a vertex $v \in V$ and two configurations φ and ψ outside v such that $\varphi(w) \geq \psi(w)$ for all $w\not=v$, the μ-conditional distribution of φ(v) given $\{\varphi(w) : w\not=v\}$ stochastically dominates the μ-conditional distribution of ψ(v) given $\{\psi(w) : w\not=v\}$.

Now, if μ satisfies this monotonicity property, that is already enough for the FKG inequality (positive associations) to hold.

Here is a rough sketch of the proof, due to Holley (1974): starting from any initial configuration on $V$, one can run a simple Markov chain (the Metropolis algorithm) that uses independent Uniform[0,1] random variables to update the configuration in each step, such that the chain has a unique stationary measure, the given μ. The monotonicity of μ implies that the configuration at each step is a monotone function of independent variables, hence the product measure version of Harris implies that it has positive associations. Therefore, the limiting stationary measure μ also has this property.

The monotonicity property has a natural version for two measures, saying that μ_{1} conditionally pointwise dominates μ_{2}. It is again easy to see that if μ_{1} and μ_{2} satisfy the lattice-type condition of the Holley inequality, then μ_{1} conditionally pointwise dominates μ_{2}. On the other hand, a Markov chain coupling argument similar to the above, but now without invoking the Harris inequality, shows that conditional pointwise domination, in fact, implies stochastically domination. Stochastic domination is equivalent to saying that $\langle f\rangle_1 \ge \langle f\rangle_2$ for all increasing ƒ, thus we get a proof of the Holley inequality. (And thus also a proof of the FKG inequality, without using the Harris inequality.)

See Holley (1974) and Georgii, Häggström & Maes (2001) for details.

== See also ==
- Ahlswede–Daykin inequality
- XYZ inequality
- BK inequality
