= Education in Flanders =

Flemish Ministry of Education and Training (Vlaams Ministerie van Onderwijs en Vorming)
- Flemish Minister for Education: Ben Weyts

National education budget (2015)
- Budget: € 11 bn

General details
- Primary languages: Dutch
- System type: Community

Literacy
- Total: 99
- Male: 99
- Female: 99

Enrollment
- Total: 1,302,422 ('09-'10)
- Primary: 407,902 ('09-'10)
- Secondary: 448,760 ('09-'10)
- Post secondary: 193,215 ('09-'10)

The education in the Flemish Community covers the Dutch-speaking part of Belgium and consists of three networks (netten): government-provided education (gemeenschapsonderwijs), subsidized public schools (by provinces and municipalities) and subsidized free schools (mainly affiliated to the Catholic church).

== Generally ==
In the past there were conflicts between state schools and Catholic schools (de schoolstrijd), and disputes regarding whether the Catholic schools' should be funded by the government. The 1958 School Pact was an agreement by the three large political parties (the Christian Democratic, Socialist and Liberal parties) to end these conflicts.

Due to the federalization of Belgium, education is organised by the three communities since 1989. Since then, the Flemish Government organises education in the Flemish Region as well as in the bilingual Brussels-Capital Region where the Government of the French Community is also responsible. The Flemish Community organises the Dutch-language education but has to provide French-language schools in the 12 municipalities with language facilities within the Flemish Region.

The federal level only regulates a few general matters: the start and end of compulsory education (which is between the ages of 6 and 18), the minimal conditions for issuing diplomas, and the pension scheme. Article 24 of the Belgian Constitution furthermore guarantees free education, the right of parents to choose their school and the (philosophical, ideological and religious) neutrality of government-provided schools. These state schools have to provide the choice between the teaching of one of the recognized religions and non-denominational moral teaching.

== Networks ==
2013–14 enrolment by network (basic and secondary schools)
1. Private schools (nearly all Catholic) (66.7%)
2. Community (state) schools (16.3%)
3. Municipal/city schools (15.7%)
4. Provincial schools (1.28%)
5. VGC schools (Brussels) (0.03%)
6. Intercommunal schools (0.02%)

Education is organised through three networks.

First, there are state schools directly provided by the Flemish government, which is called Gemeenschapsonderwijs (literally "community education"), stylised as "GO!", education of the Flemish Community. They are both primary and secondary schools as well as adult education centres. Most secondary schools are commonly named (Koninklijk) Atheneum ("(Royal) Atheneum"), most of which were built in the 1960s during the schoolstrijd ("school struggle") in Belgium. One of the oldest athenea is the Royal Atheneum of Antwerp, which exists since 1808.

Secondly, there are subsidized public schools (officieel gesubsidieerd onderwijs), which are public schools organized by provinces and municipalities. Those provided by the municipalities are coordinated through the Education Secretariat of the Cities and Municipalities of the Flemish Community (Onderwijssecretariaat van de Steden en Gemeenten van de Vlaamse Gemeenschap; OVSG). This network also includes a few schools organised by the Flemish Community Commission (VGC) in Brussels.

Lastly, there are subsidized free schools (vrij gesubsidieerd onderwijs), which is with about 70% of the pupils by far the largest group. They are mainly organized by an organization affiliated to the Catholic Church, organised by Catholic Education Flanders (Katholiek Onderwijs Vlaanderen), formerly known as the Flemish Secretariat of the Catholic Education (Vlaams Secretariaat van het Katholiek Onderwijs; VSKO). Only eight schools are affiliated to the Protestant Church, so-called "Schools with the Bible". There are also non-denominational free schools, "method schools" using e.g. the Steiner, Freinet or Montessori education method.

Homeschooling is also legal since "learning" is mandatory in Belgium as opposed to attending school. Homeschooling is very rare, but the numbers are rising slowly. For the year 2007—2008 the number of home-schooled children in Flanders rose to 279 in basic education and 504 in secondary education, out of a total of 1.3 million.

== Levels ==
The different levels of education in Flanders

=== Basic education ===
Basic education (basisonderwijs) consists of optional pre-school (kleuteronderwijs) and six years of mandatory primary education (lager onderwijs). The mandatory education starts on 1 September of the year in which the child has its sixth birthday.

=== Secondary education ===
Secondary education (secundair onderwijs) also consists of six years starting from the age of 12. Secondary school is divided into four general types. Each type consists of a set of different directions that may vary from school to school. The general types are as follows:

- General Secondary Education (Dutch: Algemeen Secundair Onderwijs; ASO. About 40% of all pupils): A very broad, general education, preparing for higher education.
- Technical Secondary Education (Dutch: Technisch Secundair Onderwijs; TSO. About 30% of all pupils): The TSO is divided into two groups of education again: TTK and STK. The TTK courses focus more on technical aspects, the STK courses focus more on practical matters.
- Vocational Secondary Education (Dutch: Beroepssecundair Onderwijs; BSO. About 30% of all pupils): Very practical and very job-specific education. Afterwards, several directions offer seventh, sometimes eighth, specialisation years.
- Art Secondary Education (Dutch: Kunstsecundair onderwijs; KSO. About 2% of all pupils): These schools link general and broad secondary education development with active art practice, ranging from performance arts to display arts.

Students with disabilities can follow Special Secondary Education (Dutch: Buitengewoon Secundair Onderwijs; BuSO), of different types.

=== Higher education ===
There are five universities in the Flemish Community, each forming an "association" with one or more university colleges (hogescholen).

- The Catholic University of Leuven (KU Leuven) is the largest university and the oldest in the Low Countries. As of 2014, it had 46,385 enrolled students, or 20% of all students in Flemish higher education. It forms the KU Leuven Association together with various university colleges located throughout Flanders.
- Ghent University (UGent) is a public university which was known as Rijksuniversiteit Gent (State University of Ghent) until being granted autonomy in 1991. The Ghent University Association further includes Hogeschool Gent, which is the largest university college of Flanders, Arteveldehogeschool and Hogeschool West-Vlaanderen.
- The University of Antwerp forms the Antwerp University Association together with Artesis Plantijn Hogeschool Antwerpen, Karel de Grote-Hogeschool and the Antwerp Maritime Academy.
- The Free University of Brussels (VUB) forms the Brussels University Association with the Erasmushogeschool Brussel.
- The University of Hasselt forms the Limburg University Association together with the larger Hogeschool PXL.

The former Catholic University of Brussels (K.U. Brussel) merged into the Catholic University of Leuven.

Many universities and university colleges are historically tied to their respective "pillars" in society, KU Leuven being the prominent Catholic university, Ghent University being tied to the socialist pillar and the Free University of Brussels representing the liberal pillar.

Certain universities have agreements which give students the option of following certain courses in the French-speaking counterpart:

- Katholieke Universiteit Leuven - Université catholique de Louvain & Saint-Louis University, Brussels
- Vrije Universiteit Brussel - Université libre de Bruxelles

As part of the Bologna Process, the Flemish government set up in cooperation with the Dutch government an Accreditation Organisation of the Netherlands and Flanders (NVAO).

As of 2014, 227,943 students were enrolled in Flemish higher education.

== Quality ==
Education in Belgium, particularly in Flanders, is often considered to be of high quality.

In the Trends in International Mathematics and Science Study (TIMSS), Flanders is among the top countries. In mathematics for example, Flemish eighth-grade students were the 5th–6th best performing in 1995–2003 (Flanders is not included in the study for 2007).

=== Foreign students ===
Relatively many students of neighbouring countries, especially from the Netherlands, attend Flemish schools.

In primary and secondary education, this is some 5,950 students as of 2011 (25,200 if families from neighbouring countries but actually living in Flanders are included too), a rising number. On the other hand, a decreasing 1,422 Flemish students attend schools in neighbouring countries.

== Language ==
=== Medium of instruction ===
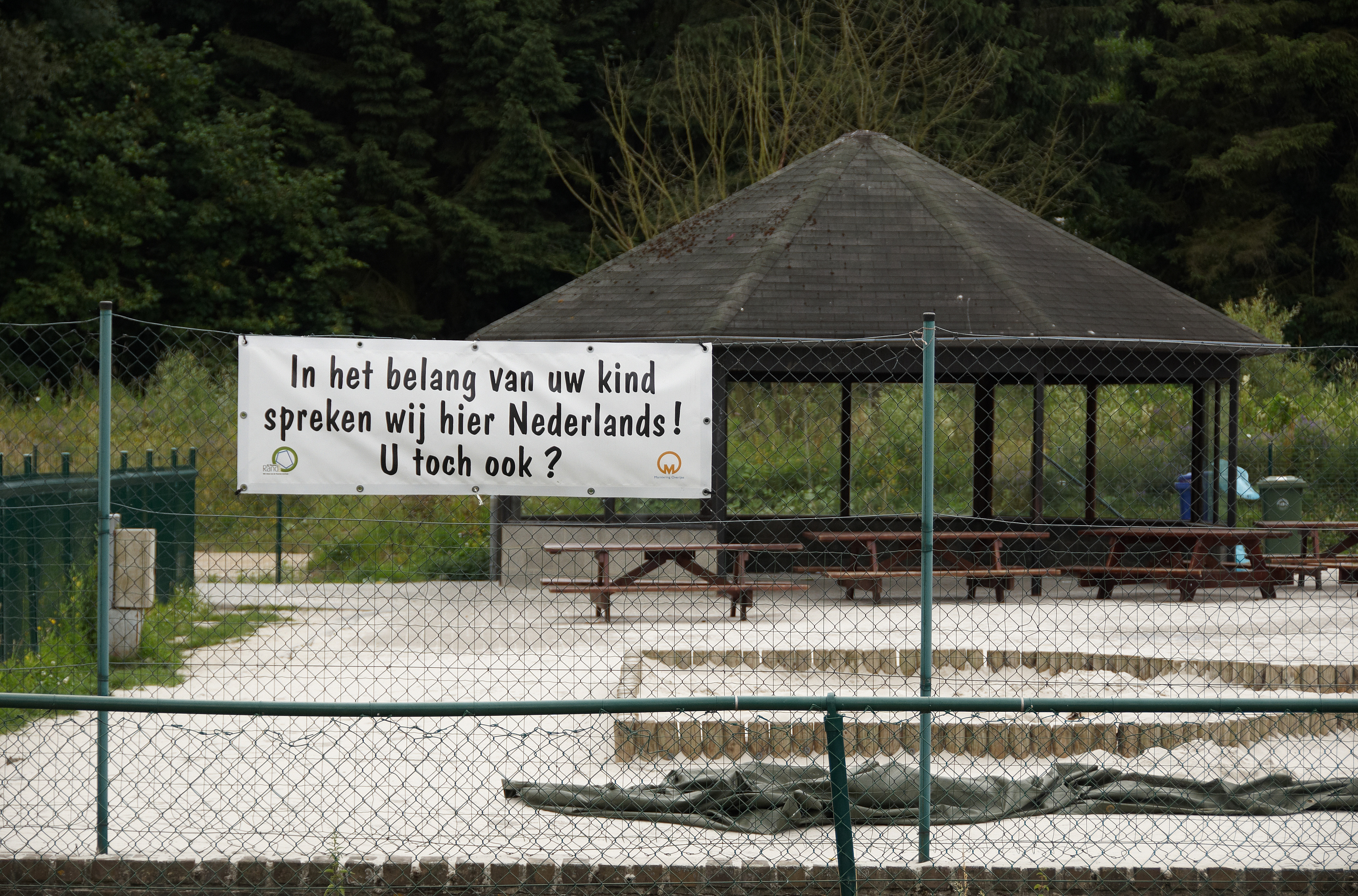
A poster at a school in Huldenberg saying: "In the interest of your child, we speak Dutch here! You do too?"

The language used as medium of instruction in schools subsidized by the Flemish government is Dutch. Flemish schools in Brussels provide Dutch-medium education, whereas French-medium education there is provided by or recognised by the Government of the French Community. The Flemish Government is however required to provide French-medium schools in the twelve municipalities with language facilities if there is demand for it.

Contrary to French-speaking Belgium and other European countries, bilingual education is still rare in Flanders.

In higher education, the use of English is allowed but restricted.

=== Foreign languages ===
All Dutch-speaking schools teach French as first foreign language, English being the second foreign language. German and Spanish are often also available depending on the school direction.

Compared to other European countries, Flemish pupils aged 13–15 score remarkably well for their knowledge of English, which is taught as a second foreign language, although less so for French, which is the first foreign language.

Olyfran is a popular contest organised to test students' knowledge of the French language.

== Brussels ==
In Brussels, the Dutch-speaking school system functions separately from the French-language education system. For the Flemish schools in Brussels, The "Scholengroep Brussels" serves as the organising body for most of the "state schools" ("GO!" education), while the Flemish Community Commission is the organising body for the Dutch-speaking Brussels schools that until 1995 belonged to the province of Brabant.

In February 2012, the Dutch-speaking schools in the Brussels-Capital Region counted 11,776 in pre-school education, 14,850 pupils in primary education and 12,535 in secondary education. These numbers have been growing considerably since several decades.

Some of the students speak Dutch at home, others French, but about half of those attending Dutch-speaking schools in Brussels use another language at home.

== See also ==
- Education in Belgium
- Education in the Netherlands
- Flemish Union of Students
- List of universities in Belgium
- Academic grading in Belgium
- Science and technology in Flanders
- Open access in Belgium
