= Belgian School Wars =

Two political conflicts in Belgium over religion in education

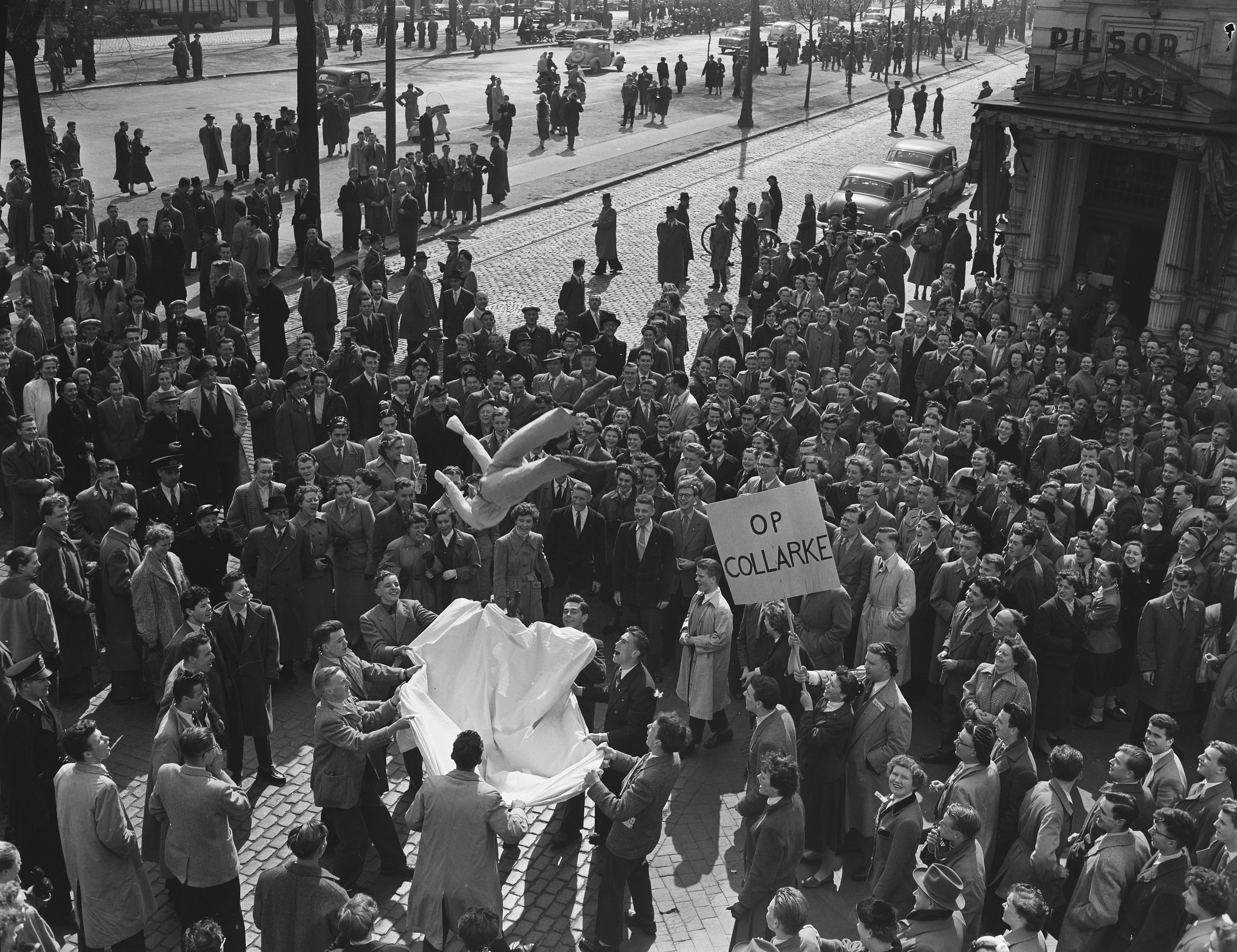
Demonstration by Belgian Catholics in Antwerp against the Collard School Law, 1955

The Belgian School Wars (Schoolstrijd, Guerres scolaires) refer to two major political conflicts in Belgium concerning the role of religion in education. The first, known as the First School War, took place between 1879 and 1884. The second, known as the Second School War, occurred between 1950 and 1959. Each conflict revolved around state funding of schools and the extent of religious influence in public education.

== Background ==
Education has been a recurring point of contention in Belgian politics since independence in 1830. Article 17 of the Constitution of 1831 guaranteed freedom of education. In practice, primary schooling was dominated by the Catholic Church, while liberal politicians sought to expand secular, state-controlled schools. Similar disputes over church and state education also occurred elsewhere in Europe, such as the Kulturkampf in Germany (1871–1878) and the Jules Ferry laws in France (1881–1882), and outside Europe, such as the Oregon Compulsory Education Act in the United States.

== First School War (1879–1884) ==
In 1879, a Liberal government under Walthère Frère-Orban passed a law secularising primary education and ending state support for Catholic schools. The Catholic Church opposed the law and encouraged a boycott of the new secular schools. By 1883, although nearly 3,900 secular schools had been created, Catholic school enrolment had risen significantly. After the 1884 elections, the Catholic Party repealed the law and restored subsidies, ushering in a long period of Catholic political dominance.

== Second School War (1950–1959) ==
A second conflict followed after World War II. Education Minister Pierre Harmel of the Christian Social Party increased subsidies for private (mainly Catholic) schools. After the 1954 elections, a Liberal–Socialist coalition reversed these measures under Minister Leo Collard, prompting mass Catholic protests. The dispute ended with the School Pact (Pacte scolaire / Schoolpact) of 1958, which guaranteed state support for both public and private schools and recognised parental choice. The pact was ratified by Parliament in 1959 and remains the basis of the Belgian educational system.

== Legacy ==
The School Wars entrenched the divide between Catholic and Liberal–Socialist political "pillars" in Belgium and shaped the country’s educational landscape. The 1958 School Pact established a framework for coexistence between Catholic and state schools which continues into the 21st century.

== See also ==
- First School War
- Second School War
- Education Act 1870 (United Kingdom)
- Education Act 1902 (United Kingdom)
- Oregon Compulsory Education Act (United States)
- Kulturkampf (Germany)
- Jules Ferry laws (France)
