= Koninklijk Atheneum Vijverhof =

Coordinates: 51.185167°N 3.217492°E

Royal Athenaeum Vijverhof
- Koninklijk Atheneum Vijverhof

Location
- Vijverhoflaan 13; Sint-Michiels, Bruges, West Flanders; Belgium

Information
- Type: Community Education
- Motto: De ruimte die je nodig hebt. (The space you need.)
- Established: 1973
- School district: Bruges
- Principal: Guido Ooghe
- Grades: 6 grades (1st-6th)
- Campus: 2,7 ha
- Colour: Green
- school group: Brugge-Oostkust scholengroep25.be
- Website: kavijverhof.be

The Koninklijk Atheneum Vijverhof (Koninklijk Atheneum II, its administration name) (Royal Athenaeum Vijverhof in English) (1973–2014) was a secondary school situated in Sint-Michiels, a suburb of Bruges, Belgium. It is part of the school group "Brugge-Oostkust" (Bruges-Eastcoast in English). The school offers education in the ASO (General Secondary Education) division. There is a free choice of religion at the school.

Aerial Picture of the Campus.

== Germz ==
=== School year ===
- Every school year starts the first of September and ends June 30. There is no school on public holidays.
- The average school day begins at 8:20 am and ends at 4:30 pm. Students get an hour break for lunch and a short recess every 2 periods (1 period = 50minutes). On Wednesday the school day starts at 8:20 am and ends at 11:55 am with a recess between the 2nd and 3rd period.
- The school year consists of three trimesters with an exam for each subject at the end of each semester. They also receive a grade on quality of their work over the entire trimester. (homework, tests, projects etc.) This makes for 5 grades for each subject at the end of the year.
  - The students get a report card each trimester containing:
    - The evaluations of their performance for each subject.
    - The results of the exams for each subject.

=== Classes ===
The 6 Classes are in the ASO division

There are 6 classes for the ASO division.(see picture on the right) The 6 classes are divided into 3 cycles:

- First cycle (year 1 and 2)
- Second cycle (year 3 and 4)
- Third cycle (year 5 and 6)

=== GWP ===
- GWP stands for geïntegreerde werkperiode or Integrated Work Period. This is a period during the year where each grade travels with school to different locations across Europe for a more integrated lesson.

For example: in 2007:

  - (Belgium) Blankenberge at the Belgian coast, for the 1st grade
  - Ardennes in the south of Belgium, for the 2nd grade
  - (United Kingdom) Kent in England, for the 3rd grade
  - Normandy in northern France, for the 4th grade
  - Camargue in southern France, for the 5th and 6th grade

And in 2008:

  - (United Kingdom) Kent in England, for the 3rd grade
  - Normandy in northern France, for the 4th grade
  - Ardennes in the south of Belgium, for the 5th grade
  - Paris The capital of France, for the 6th grade

== Natural Environment ==
Maintenance of one of the ponds.

The school has a pond on its campus which is a recognised reservation by the WWF. The pond is used for educational purposes and he provides a habitat for a variety of species. The maintenance is done by the students as seen on the picture.

== See also ==
- Community Education
- Education in Belgium
