= School Pact =

1958 political agreement in Belgium on education

The School Pact (Dutch: Schoolpact, French: Pacte scolaire) is the name given to a political agreement concluded in Belgium on 6 November 1958 and ratified by Parliament in 1959. It ended the Second School War (1950–1959), a political crisis over the funding and role of religion in education. The pact established a framework guaranteeing the coexistence of state and private (mainly Catholic) schools and remains a foundation of the Belgian education system.

== Background ==
Since Belgian independence in 1830, education policy had been a recurring source of political conflict, notably during the First School War (1879–1884) and Second School War (1950–1959). The Second School War was triggered by disputes over state subsidies for Catholic schools and measures to expand secular schools.

== Negotiations ==
After the 1958 elections, a minority government led by Gaston Eyskens (PSC–CVP) initiated negotiations with the opposition Socialist and Liberal parties. The aim was to resolve disputes between Catholic and secular "school networks" and to guarantee stability in education policy. The talks led to the conclusion of the School Pact on 6 November 1958.

== Content ==
The pact established the following principles:

- Parents have the right to choose between state schools and private (mainly Catholic) schools for their children.
- Both networks receive public subsidies. Funding is linked to pupil numbers.
- Teacher salaries are guaranteed by the state, under equal conditions for both networks.
- The state retains responsibility for inspection and curriculum standards.
- Expansion of schools is subject to local needs and population growth.

The agreement also regulated the recognition of diplomas and the appointment of teachers.

== Ratification ==
The pact was approved by Parliament in 1959. Its provisions were implemented through legislation that established long-term rules for financing and organising Belgian education. The settlement marked the end of large-scale political conflict on education policy.

== Legacy ==
The School Pact is considered a cornerstone of Belgian "pillarisation" (Dutch: verzuiling / French: pilarisation), the division of society along ideological lines. It institutionalised the coexistence of Catholic and state schools and has shaped Belgian education into the 21st century. The compromise is frequently cited as a model of Belgian consociational politics.

== See also ==
- First School War
- Second School War
- Belgian School Wars
- Education in Belgium
- Pillarisation
- Jules Ferry laws (France)
- Kulturkampf (Germany)
