= Franz Thomas Bruss =

Belgian-German professor of mathematics

F. Thomas Bruss
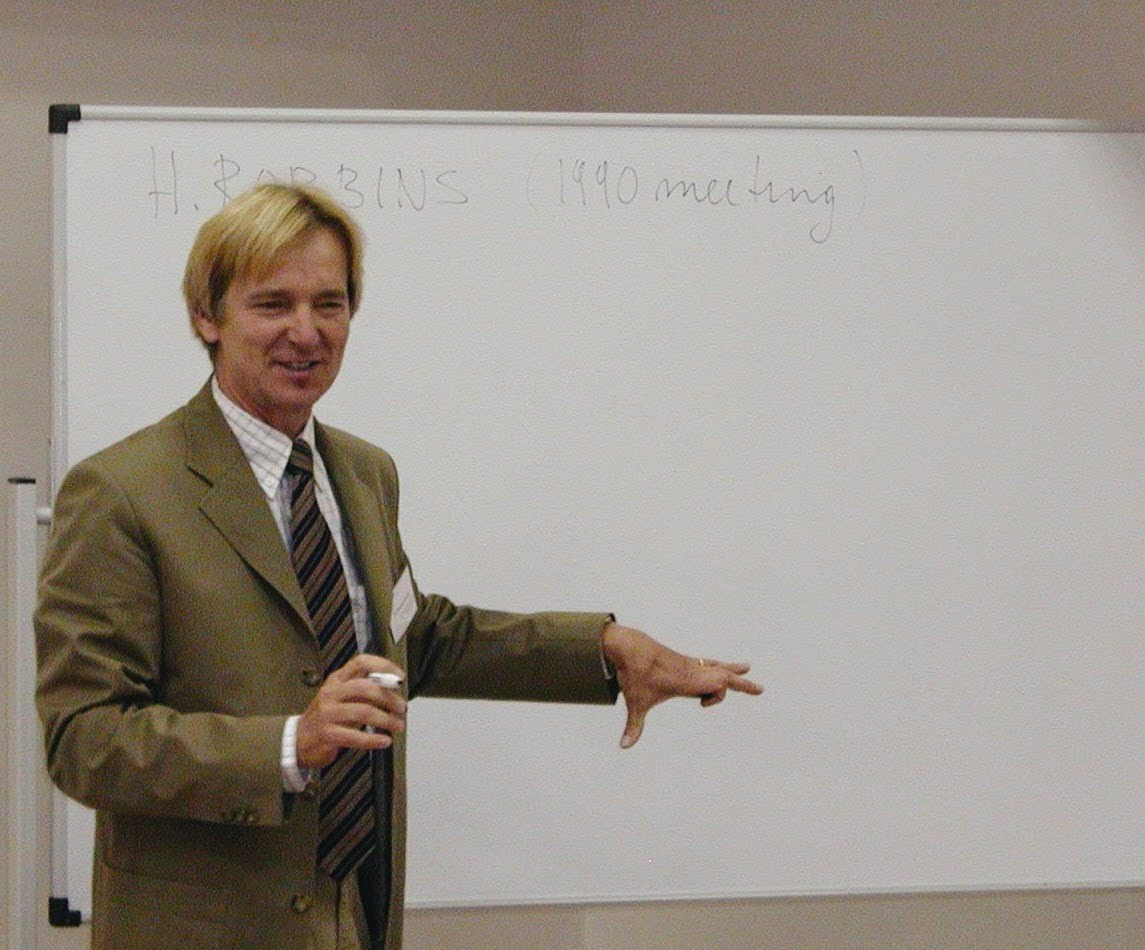
- Bruss (ca. 2005)
- Born: Kleinblittersdorf (Saarland), Germany
- Education: Saarland University; Cambridge University; University of Sheffield
- Known for: 1/e-law of best choice, Odds algorithm of optimal stopping Bruss–Duerinckx theorem BRS-inequality
- Awards: Order of Leopold (Belgium) (2011); Alexander von Humboldt Foundation fellow Institute of Mathematical Statistics fellow elected member of the Tönissteiner Kreis e.V. Jacques Deruyts Prize (period 2000–2004)
- Scientific career
- Fields: Mathematics
- Workplaces: Namur University; University of California at Santa Barbara; University of Arizona at Tucson; University of California at Los Angeles; Vesalius College; Vrije Universiteit Brussel.
- Thesis: Hinreichende Kriterien für das Aussterben von modifizierten Verzweigungsprozessen (1977)
- Doctoral advisor: Gerd Schmidt
- Doctoral students: Yves-Caoimhin Swan, Rémi Dendievel

Franz Thomas Bruss (born 27 September 1949 in Kleinblittersdorf (Saarland, Germany)) is Emeritus Professor of Mathematics at the Université libre de Bruxelles, where he had been director of "Mathématiques Générales" and co-director of the probability chair, and where he continues his research as invited professor.

== Life ==
Thomas Bruss studied mathematics at the Universities Saarbrücken, Cambridge and Sheffield. In 1977 he obtained the Dr. rer. nat at Saarbrücken with his thesis Hinreichende Kriterien für das Aussterben von modifizierten Verzweigungsprozessen (Sufficient Conditions for the Extinction of Modified Branching Processes) under Professor Gerd Schmidt, and the legal Dr. en sciences of Belgium one year later.

== Academic career ==
After a scientific career at the Saarland University and University of Namur he moved to the United States and taught at the University of California, Santa Barbara, University of Arizona, Tucson, and then at University of California, Los Angeles. In 1990 he returned to Europe as professor of mathematics at Vesalius College, Vrije Universiteit Brussel. In 1993 he was appointed chair of Mathématiques Générales et Probabilités at the Université libre de Bruxelles, where he has stayed since then. He held visiting positions at the University of Zaire, Kinshasa, University of Strathclyde, Glasgow, University of Antwerp, Purdue University, University of Kiel, Université de Namur, and repeatedly at the Université Catholique de Louvain.

Bruss is fellow of the Alexander von Humboldt Foundation, fellow of the Institute of Mathematical Statistics, elected member of the Tönissteiner Kreis e.V., Germany, and member of the International Statistical Institute. In 2004 he received the Jacques Deruyts Prize (period 2000–2004) for distinguished contributions to mathematics from the Belgian Academy of Science Académie Royale de Belgique.

In 2011, Thomas Bruss was honoured Commandeur de Order of Leopold of Belgium.

Under his presidency (2017–2019) the Belgian Statistical Society has received royal favour and become the Royal Statistical Society of Belgium (French: Société Royale Belge de Statistique – Dutch: Koninklijke Belgische Vereniging voor Statistiek)

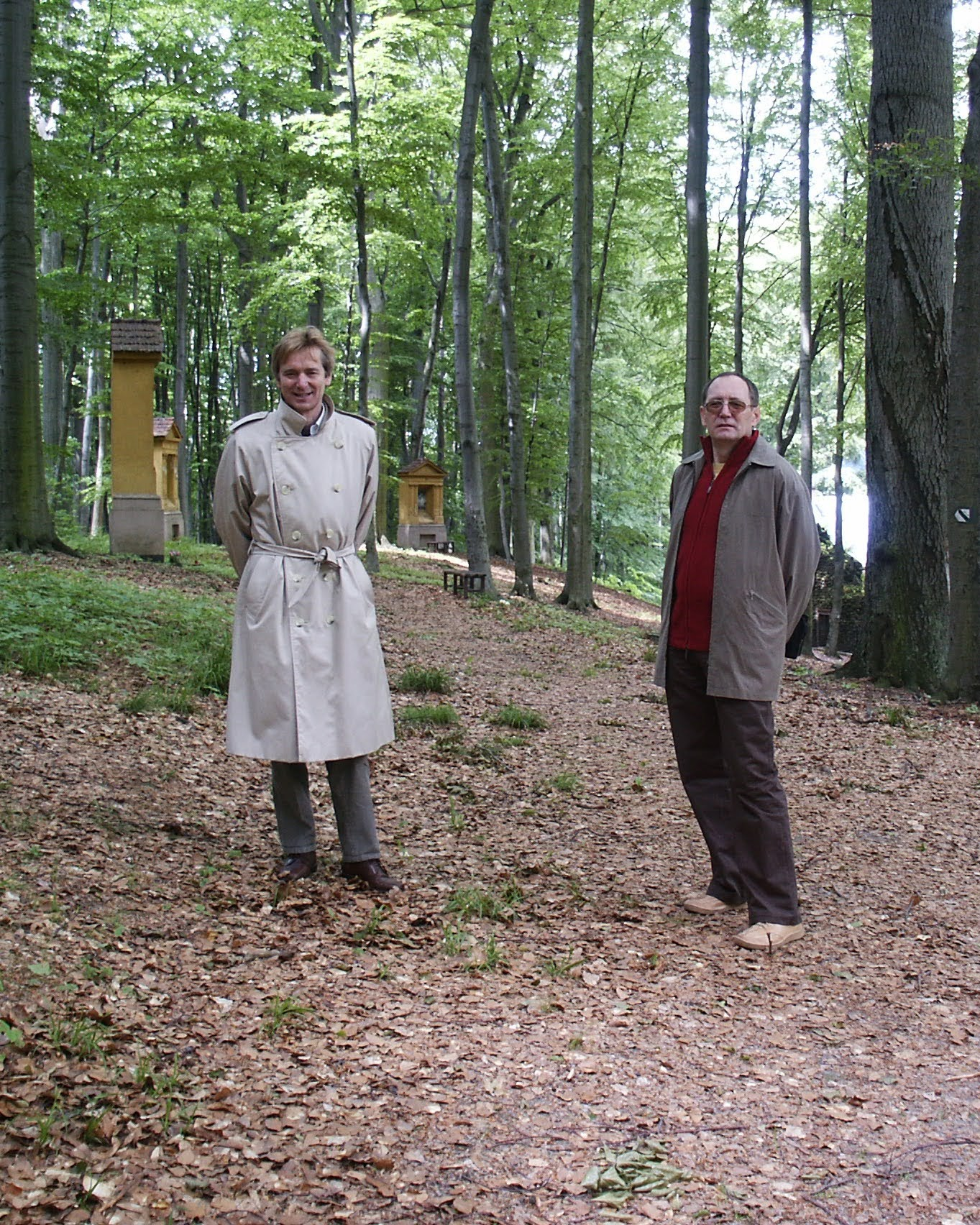
F.Thomas Bruss and Zdzisław J. Porosiński, the forest near Trzebnica with Stations of the Cross, Calvary

== Contributions ==
His main research activities and achievements in mathematics are in the field of probability. He published 64 research papers concerning:

- Odds algorithm
- Secretary problem (1/e-law of best choice)
- Robbins' problem (of optimal stopping)
- Galton–Watson processes (bi-sexual)
- Resource Dependent Branching Processes
- Bruss–Duerinckx theorem
- Borel–Cantelli lemma
- BRS-inequality (Bruss-Robertson-Steele inequality)
- Longest increasing subsequence
- Pascal processes
- Last-arrival problem

== See also ==
- Bruss-Strategie
- Clinical trials
- Royal Statistical Society of Belgium
