= Flemish Union of Students =

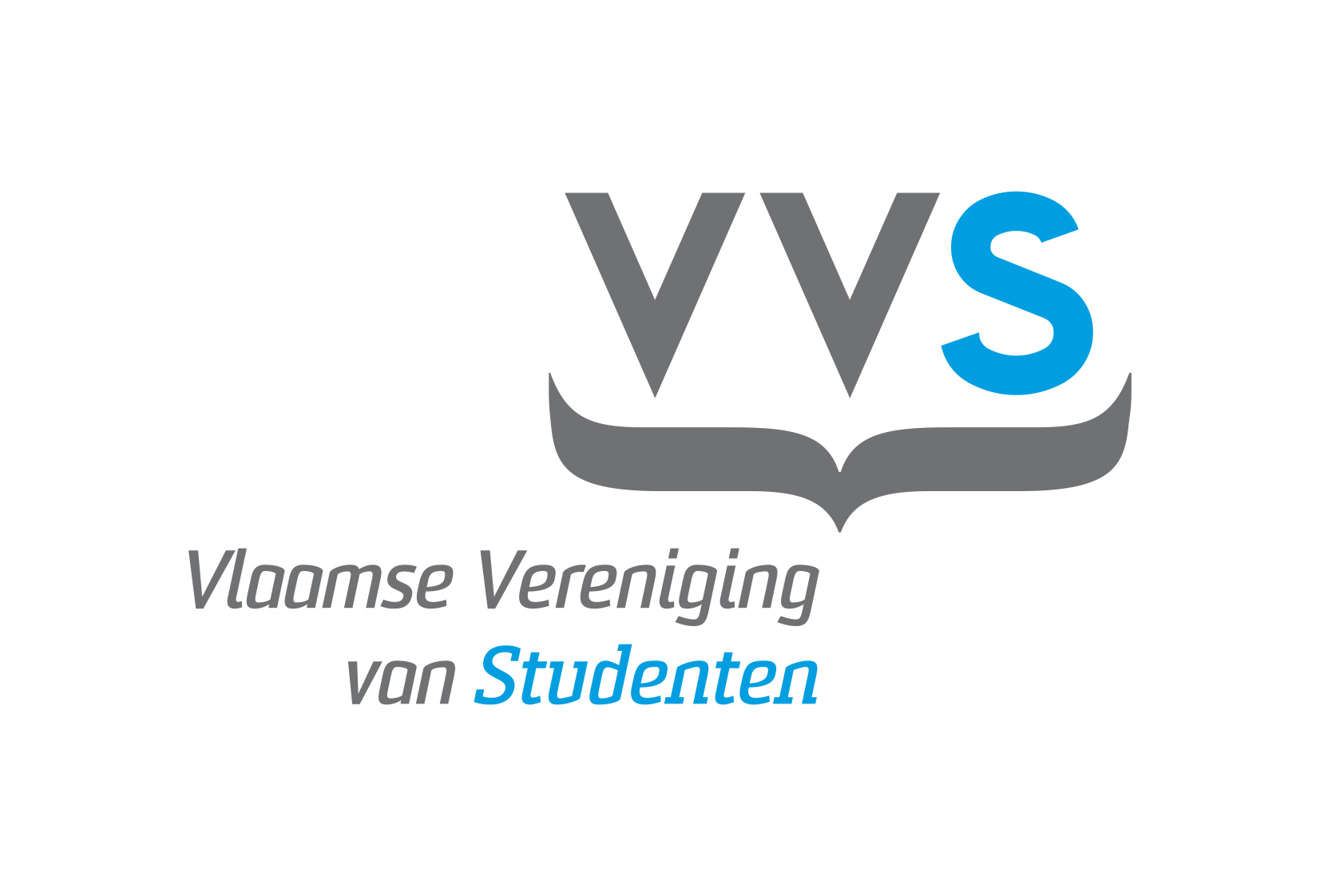

The Flemish Union of Students (Dutch: Vlaamse Vereniging van Studenten; VVS) is an organisation that represents the students of Flanders, the Dutch-speaking part of Belgium.

VVS can only represent the students in the Flemish community of Belgium due to the historically grown federalisation of the country. For the French Community of Belgium there is a separate student union (FEF). VVS is a member of the European Students' Union.

== See also ==
- Education in Flanders
- Education in Belgium
