= School struggle =

School struggle can refer to:

- School struggle (Netherlands) (19th and 20th century)
- First School War (Belgium, 1880s)
- Second School War (Belgium, 1950s)
