= Olyfran =

OLYFRAN, which stands for Olympiade flamande du français (French for "Flemish Olympiad for French") is a contest organised in Flanders (the Dutch-speaking part of Belgium) to test students' knowledge of the French language (which is the language spoken in the southern part of Belgium, Wallonia).

== History ==
In 1987, Willy Clijsters, professor French as Foreign Language (FLE) at the Hasselt University and president of DiWeF, the association of Flemish teachers FLE, launched "La Tour Eiffel - Concours de Français".

This contest consisted of a written selection test of 100 multiple choice questions in three different categories, followed by a classification interview in front of a mixed jury of teachers and representatives of the business world. The elimination question lists are mainly centred on everyday communication and have been developed in a contrastive approach. This means that the questions are partially written in the source language, Dutch.

The initiative, which was launched in 1988 to make the teaching of French more dynamic for youngsters in the Belgian province of Limburg, welcomed about 1,200 participants from all over Flanders. Soon, all the Flemish universities (Leuven - Kortrijk - Ghent - Antwerp - Brussels) joined the organization. Growing very quickly and strongly since, LTECF has received in each of the last few years of the competitions about 5.000 candidates.

Meanwhile, the contest changed name and is now called "the Flemish Olympiad for French” (Olyfran). As part of this activity, every year 400 multiple choice question on the French language are drawn up by secondary school teachers and academics. All this material (over 5000 MCQ), provided with several parameters, is available for Francophiles and learners of French and their teachers on the Internet.

== More information ==
- Everybody can organize their own free French competition: for one class, for one school, in a region ... Several countries have already done this.
- From the International Day of Francophonie (March 20), a World Tournament on French via the Internet welcomes participants from all around the world.
- Interchange (virtual, physical) of classes: Olyfran can help with contacts in French and Walloon (French-speaking Belgium) secondary school. Visitors may report an exchange of experience to inspire others to venture on the same exciting way.

== See also ==
- Education in Belgium
