= Vesalius College =

Liberal arts college in Brussels, Belgium

- Motto: Scientia Vincere Tenebras (Conquering the darkness through science)
- Type: Private university
- Established: 1987
- Dean: Luc Soete and Sven Van Kerckhoven
- Academic staff: 54
- Students: 1200
- Undergraduates: 300
- Location: Brussels, Belgium; 50.8245°N 4.3984°E
- Acceptance rate: 50%
- Colours: Blue & Orange
- Mascot: Silver Weasels
- Website: https://www.vesalius.edu/

Vesalius College, also known as VeCo, is a private college located in Brussels, Belgium. Founded in 1987, it is named after Andreas Vesalius, a pioneering anatomist of the Renaissance period.

The college is associated with the Vrije Universiteit Brussel (VUB) and has been part of the Brussels School of Governance, since February 2021, through an alliance with VUB's Institute for European Studies.

== Academic Programs ==
VeCo offers three-year bachelor's degree programs and one-year master's degree programs, following the Bologna process. The language of education is in English.

Vesalius College provides four undergraduate majors under the current three-year program:

- Business
- Communications
- International Affairs
- International and European Law

There are two master's programs and a master's preparatory program:

- Master of Arts in Diplomacy and Global Governance (90 or 120 ECTS option)
- Master of Arts in Global Peace, Security, and Strategic Studies (90 or 120 ECTS option).

The International Affairs curriculum includes the Undergraduate Certificate in European Peace and Security Studies (EPSS), taught in collaboration with the Belgian Royal Military Academy, the Institute for European Studies (IES) and the University of Kent.

All four majors are accredited by the Dutch-Flemish Accreditation Organization (Nederlands-Vlaamse Accreditatie Organisatie, NVAO). NVAO is the independent accreditation body established by international treaty between the Government of the Netherlands and the Flemish community government, responsible for education in Flanders, the Dutch-speaking part of Belgium.

== Location and Facilities ==
VeCo is located at Pleinlaan 5 in the Brussels borough of Ixelles, adjacent to the VUB's Etterbeek campus. The Pleinlaan campus houses administrative offices, classrooms, a conference room, computer facilities, and a student lounge. Additional facilities, including lecture halls, a library, a cafeteria, and a sports complex, are located on the VUB campus.

== Internship Program ==
VeCo offers the Versalius Internship Programme (VIP), a graded internship program that gives students the opportunity to experience an international and professional environment in Brussels. Internships are available with government organizations, multinational corporations, non-governmental organizations, think tanks, and media centers.

== Student Life ==
The student body elects a student government every academic year. The Vesalius Student Government (VSG) includes five members: a president, a vice-president and treasurer, an internal affairs representative, an external affairs representative, and a social affairs representative. Major Representatives from each academic major participate in the VSG, addressing college and academic issues.

Vesalius College Sports logo

VeCo hosts various student clubs, including a music club and a sports club. The College has various types of agreements with the following colleges, universities, and study-abroad organizations:

- The American University, Washington, D.C., United States of America
- Bentley College, Waltham, Massachusetts, United States of America
- Brethren Colleges Abroad
- CIEE - The Council for International Educational Exchange
- EDC Paris Business School, Paris, France
- Educational Programmes Abroad, London, United Kingdom
- Huron University College, London, Ontario, Canada
- International Studies Abroad, Austin, Texas
- Tec de Monterrey, San Luis Potosi, Mexico
- Kyung Hee University, Seoul, South Korea
- Kansai Gaidai University, Osaka, Japan
- Lafayette College, Easton, Pennsylvania, United States
- Anglo-American University, Prague, Czech Republic
- Rutgers University, New Brunswick, New Jersey, United States
- San Francisco State University, San Francisco, California, United States
- Solvay Business School, Université Libre de Bruxelles, Brussels, Belgium
- St. Louis University, St. Louis, Missouri, United States
- Universidad de Especialidades Espiritu Santo, Guayaquil, Ecuador
- University of Florida, Gainesville, Florida
- Universidad de las Americas, Puebla, Mexico
- University of Denver, Denver, Colorado.
