= Resource-dependent branching process =

A branching process (BP) is a mathematical model to describe the development of a population. Here population is meant in a general sense, including a human population, animal populations, bacteria and others which reproduce in a biological sense, cascade process, or particles which split in a physical sense, and others. Members of a BP-population are called individuals, or particles.

If the times of reproductions are discrete (usually denoted by 1,2, ...) then the totality of individuals present at time n and living to time n+1 excluded are thought of as forming the n^{th} generation. Simple BPs are defined by an initial state (number of individuals at time 0) and a law of reproduction, usually denoted by p_{k}, k = 1,2,....

A resource-dependent branching process (RDBP) is a discrete-time BP which models the development of a population in which individuals are supposed to have to work in order to be able to live and to reproduce. The population decides on a society form which determines the rules how available resources are distributed among the individuals. For this purpose a RDBP should incorporate at least four additional model components, namely the individual demands for resources, the creation of new resources for the next generation, the notion of a policy to distribute resources, and a control option for individuals for interactions with the society.

== Definition ==
A (discrete-time) resource-dependent branching process is a stochastic process Γ defined on the non-negative integers which is a BP defined by

- an initial state Γ_{0};
- a law of reproduction of individuals;
- a law of individual creation of resources;
- a law of individual resource demands (claims);
- a policy to distribute available resources to individuals which are present in the population
- a tool of interaction between individuals and the society.

== History and objectives of RDBPs ==
RDBPs may be seen (in a wider sense) as so-called controlled branching processes. They were introduced by F. Thomas Bruss (1983)) with the objective to model different society structures and to compare the advantages and disadvantages of different forms of human societies. In these processes individuals have a means of interaction with the society which determines the rules how the current available resources should be distributed among them. This interaction (as e.g. in form of emigration) changes the effective rate of reproduction of the individuals remaining in the society. In that respect RDBPs have some parts in common with so-called population-size dependent BPs in which the law of individual independent reproduction (see Galton-Watson process) is a function of the current population size.

== Tractable RDBPs ==
Realistic models for human societies ask for a bisexual mode of reproduction whereas in the definition of an RDBP one simply speaks of a law of reproduction. However the notion of an average reproduction rate per individual (Bruss 1984) for bisexual processes shows that for all relevant questions for the long-term behavior of human societies it is justified for simplicity to assume asexual reproduction. This is why certain limiting results of Klebaner (1984) and Jagers & Klebaner (2000) bear over to RDBPs. Models for the development of a human society in time must allow for interdependence between the different components. Such models are in general very complicated and risk to become intractable. This led to the idea not to try to model the development of a society with a (single) realistic RDBP but rather by a sequence of control actions defining a sequence of relevant short-horizon RDBPs.

Two special policies stand out as guidelines for the development of any society. The two policies are the so-called weakest-first policy (wf-policy) and the so-called strongest-first policy (sf-policy).

== Definition ==
The wf-policy is the rule to serve in each generation, as long as the accumulated resource space allows for it, with priority always the individuals with the smallest individual claims. The sf-policy is the rule to serve in each generation always with priority the largest individual resource claims, again as long as the accumulated resource space suffices. The societies adapting these policies strictly are called the wf-society, respectively the sf-society.

== Survival criteria ==
In the theory of BPs it is of interest to know whether survival of a process is possible in the long run. For RDBPs this question depends also strongly on a feature on which individuals have a great influence, namely the policy to distribute resources.

Let:

m = mean reproduction (descendants) per individual
r = mean production (resource creation) per individual
F = the individual probability distribution of claims (resources)

Further suppose that all individuals which will not obtain their resource claim will either die or emigrate before reproduction. Then using results on expected stopping times for sums of order statistics the survival criteria can be explicitly computed for both the wf-society and the sf-society as a function of m, r and F.

The arguably strongest result known for RDBPs is the theorem of the envelopment of societies. It says that, in the long run, any society which would like to survive and in which individuals prefer in general a higher standard of living to a lower one is bound to live in the long run between the wf-society and the sf-society. Intuition why this should be true, is wrong. The mathematical proof depends on the mentioned results on expected stopping times for sums of order statistics and fine-tuned balancing acts between model assumptions and different notions of convergence of random variables.

== See also ==
- Controlled branching process
- Bisexual Galton–Watson process
- Bruss–Duerinckx theorem
