= Royal Statistical Society of Belgium =

The Royal Statistical Society of Belgium (RSSB), formerly the Belgian Statistical Society is Belgium's largest statistical society. It represents members of the research and teaching community in Belgium in all major fields of statistical science, ranging from mathematical statistics, probability theory, random processes, over statistical methodology, data analysis, bio-statistics, design studies, planning of experiments, pharmaceutical studies, clinical trials, medical statistics, up to statistical learning and Big Data. Researchers and professors from Belgian universities constitute the largest part of its membership; the second largest group are researchers and consultants in pharmaceutical or chemical industry, in the insurance and the banking sector, as well as in computer and software engineering.

== History ==
The RSSB was founded on March 10, 1937 in Brussels as Société Belge de Statistique (association sans but lucratif). Its nineteen founding members were leading Belgian personalities from government, academia, industrial sectors, the army, and the church.

The first president of the Society was A. Julin who was at the same time president of the International Statistical Institute. At the beginning the number of "titulaires" (recognised members) was limited to 75 and the number of honorary members to 10. This constraint was cancelled in 1947, and the Society grew very quickly. In 1965, under the presidency of R. Dereymaeker, the society officialised also its Dutch name Belgische Vereniging voor Statistiek.

In the mid-1970s and 1980s the activities of members of the Society followed a general tendency to internationality in academia and were more visible in the United States and other countries than in Belgium itself. Following suggestions of P. Dagnelie and J.J. Droesbeke, and combined efforts of M. Hallin and J. Beirlant, this changed in the early 1990s under the consecutive presidents J. Teugels and M. Hallin who revived the Society's character of a primarily National Society, both in letters and facts. From that date onwards all official documents of the Society are published in both Dutch and French, and its working language is English.

In 2017, under the presidency of F. Thomas Bruss, the Society received royal favor of King Philippe of Belgium, and the Society became the Royal Statistical Society of Belgium (RSSB). Its official names in the national languages French and Dutch are now "Société Royale Belge de Statistique (SRBS)" and "Koninklijke Belgische Vereniging voor Statistiek (KBVS)", respectively.

== RSSB today ==
With currently around 340 members, the Society is the largest learned society in Belgium.

The administrative seat of the RSSB is the National Statistical Institute of Belgium (now Statistics Belgium (Statbel)) which is part of the federal government of Belgium. As a learned society without profit aim, the Society is independent of Statbel. Both have always stayed in regular contact, however, and the Society keeps one seat of its board reserved for a representative of SB. Also, their cooperation in those fields which concern service to the public in statistics as well as new questions of public interest in Statistics is growing.

The Society is a member of FENstatS (Fed. of Europ. National Stat. Societies), and many of its members are also members or fellows of the important international statistical societies.

== See also ==
- Statistics Belgium
- Royal Statistical Society
- International Statistical Institute
