= Henry William Watson =

British mathematician

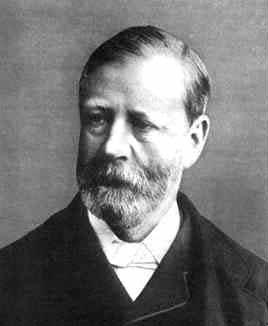
Henry William Watson

Rev. Henry William Watson FRS (25 February 1827, Marylebone, London – 11 January 1903, Brighton) was a mathematician and author of a number of mathematics books. He was an ordained priest and Cambridge Apostle.

== Life ==
Watson was born at Marylebone to Thomas Watson, R.N., and Eleanor Mary Kingston.

He was educated at King's College London and at Trinity College, Cambridge. He graduated as second wrangler and Smith's prizeman in 1850, Dr. W. H. Besant being senior wrangler. In 1851 he became fellow of Trinity college, and from 1851 to 1853 was assistant tutor there. Watson formed a close friendship with James Fitzjames Stephen, who entered Trinity in 1847. From 1853 he was mathematical master in the City of London School, and in 1857 he became mathematical lecturer at King′s College.

Watson was ordained deacon in 1856, and two years later received priest′s orders. He was an assistant master at Harrow School from 1857 to 1865, when he became rector of Berkswell near Coventry. He kept this position for 37 years, resigning in August 1902, when he moved to Brighton. His time at the rectory provided ample time to pursue mathematical and scientific studies, and he was a frequent contributor to scientific literature.

He and Francis Galton introduced the Galton–Watson process in 1875. He was made a Fellow of the Royal Society (FRS) in 1881, and took the degree D.Sc. in 1883.

He died in Brighton on 11 January 1903.

== Personal life ==
Watson married Emily Rowe in 1856. They had three children, one son and two daughters.

== Books by H. W. Watson ==
- The mathematical theory of electricity and magnetism (Volume 1: electrostatics) (Clarendon, Oxford, 1885–1889)
- The mathematical theory of electricity and magnetism (Volume 2: magnetism & electrodynamics) (Clarendon, Oxford, 1885–1889)
- A treatise on the application of generalised coordinates to the kinetics of a material system (Clarendon, Oxford, 1879)
- A treatise on the kinetic theory of gases (Clarendon, Oxford, 1893)
