= Jacques Deruyts Prize =

The Jacques Deruyts Prize (French: Prix Jacques Deruyts) is a monetary prize that recognizes distinguished research contributions in mathematics. It was first awarded in 1952 by the Académie Royale de Belgique, Classe des Sciences and is named for Jacques Deruyts who was a Belgian mathematician, known as a pioneer of group representation theory.

== Recipients ==
The recipients of the Jacques Deruyts Prize are:

- 1952: Paul Gillis
- 1956: Jean Teghem
- 1960: Félix Alardin
- 1964: No award
- 1968: No award
- 1972: Lucien Waelbroeck
- 1976: Jean-Pierre Gossez
- 1980: Paul Godin
- 1984: Jean Schmets
- 1988: Marc De Wilde
- 1992: Christian Fabry
- 1996: Jean Bricmont
- 2000: Jean Schmets
- 2004: F. Thomas Bruss
- 2008: Thierry De Pauw
- 2012: Denis Bonheure
- 2016: Siegfried Hörmann
- 2020: Jean Van Schaftingen
- 2024: Joel Fine

== See also ==
- List of mathematics awards
