= Jacques Deruyts =

Belgian mathematician (1862–1945)

Joseph Gustave Jacques Deruyts (18 March 1862 – 5 July 1945) was a Belgian mathematician, known as a pioneer of group representation theory. He is the elder brother of the mathematician François Deruyts.

Deruyts received his doctorate in 1883 from the University of Liège and was appointed there as assistant to Louis Pérard in experimental physics. Deruyts joined the academic staff in mathematics and was appointed in 1883 a professor of geometry at the University of Liège, where he remained until retirement as professor emeritus.

He was elected in 1892 as a member of the Royal Academy of Science, Letters and Fine Arts of Belgium, which has been awarding since 1952 the Jacques Deruyts Prize.

He published in 1892 a treatise Essai d'une théorie générale des formes algébriques which was pioneering research in the representation theory of linear groups and algebraic groups. He was an Invited Speaker of the ICM with talk "Sur la théorie algébrique des formes à séries de n variables" in 1920 at Strasbourg.
