= Branching process =

Kind of stochastic process

In probability theory, a branching process is a type of mathematical object known as a stochastic process, which consists of collections of random variables indexed by some set, usually natural or non-negative real numbers. The original purpose of branching processes was to serve as a mathematical model of a population in which each individual in generation $n$ produces some random number of individuals in generation $n+1$, according, in the simplest case, to a fixed probability distribution that does not vary from individual to individual. Branching processes are used to model reproduction; for example, the individuals might correspond to bacteria, each of which generates 0, 1, or 2 offspring with some probability in a single time unit. Branching processes can also be used to model other systems with similar dynamics, e.g., the spread of surnames in genealogy (Galton-Watson processes) or the propagation of neutrons in a nuclear reactor.

Branching process theory provides a tractable framework for calculating extinction probabilities for population processes in cases where individuals act independently. Using Wald's equation, it can be shown that starting with one individual in generation zero, the expected size of generation n equals μ^{n} where μ is the expected number of children of each individual. If μ < 1, then the expected number of individuals goes rapidly to zero, which implies ultimate extinction with probability 1 by Markov's inequality. Alternatively, if μ > 1, then the probability of ultimate extinction is less than 1 (but not necessarily zero; consider a process where each individual either has 0 or 100 children with equal probability. In that case, μ = 50, but probability of ultimate extinction is greater than 0.5, since that's the probability that the first individual has 0 children). If μ = 1, then ultimate extinction occurs with probability 1 unless each individual always has exactly one child.

In theoretical ecology, the parameter μ of a branching process is called the basic reproductive number.

== Mathematical formulation ==
Discrete time branching processes

The most common formulation of a branching process is that of the Galton–Watson process, which is a discrete time process. Let Z_{n} denote the state in period n (often interpreted as the size of generation n), and let X_{n,i} be a random variable denoting the number of direct successors of member i in period n, where X_{n,i} are independent and identically distributed random variables over all n ∈{ 0, 1, 2, ...} and i ∈ {1, ..., Z_{n}}. The value of the process in the next generation is given by

$$Z_{n+1} = \sum_{i=1}^{Z_n} X_{n,i}$$

Alternatively, the branching process can be formulated as a random walk. Let S_{i} denote the state in period i, and let X_{i} be a random variable that is iid over all i. Then the recurrence equation is

$$S_{i+1} = S_i+X_{i+1}-1 = \sum_{j=1}^{i+1} X_j-i$$

with S_{0} = 1. To gain some intuition for this formulation, imagine a walk where the goal is to visit every node, but every time a previously unvisited node is visited, additional nodes are revealed that must also be visited. Let S_{i} represent the number of revealed but unvisited nodes in period i, and let X_{i} represent the number of new nodes that are revealed when node i is visited. Then in each period, the number of revealed but unvisited nodes equals the number of such nodes in the previous period, plus the new nodes that are revealed when visiting a node, minus the node that is visited. The process ends once all revealed nodes have been visited.

=== Continuous-time branching processes ===
In continuous-time branching processes, each individual waits for a random time (which is a continuous random variable), and then divides according to the given distribution. The waiting time for different individuals are independent, and are independent with the number of children. In Markov processes, the waiting time is an exponential random variable.

== Extinction problem for a branching process ==
The ultimate extinction probability is given by

$$\lim_{n \to \infty} \Pr(Z_n=0).$$

For any nontrivial cases (trivial cases are ones in which the probability of having no offspring is zero for every member of the population - in such cases the probability of ultimate extinction is 0), the probability of ultimate extinction equals one if μ ≤ 1 and strictly less than one if μ > 1.

The process can be analyzed using the method of probability generating functions. Let p_{0}, p_{1}, p_{2}, ... be the probabilities of producing 0, 1, 2, ... offspring by each individual in each generation. Let d_{m} be the extinction probability by the m^{th} generation, starting with a single individual (i.e. $Z_0=1$). Obviously, d_{0} = 0 and d_{1} = p_{0}. Since the probabilities for all paths that lead to 0 by the m^{th} generation must be added up, the extinction probability is nondecreasing in generations. That is,

$$0=d_0 \leq d_1\leq d_2 \leq \cdots \leq 1.$$

Therefore, d_{m} converges to a limit d, and d is the ultimate extinction probability. If there are j offspring in the first generation, then to die out by the mth generation, each of these lines must die out in m − 1 generations. Since they proceed independently, the probability is (d_{m−1}) ^{j}. Thus,

$$d_m=p_0+p_1d_{m-1}+p_2(d_{m-1})^2+p_3(d_{m-1})^3+\cdots. \,$$

The right-hand side of the equation is a probability generating function. Let h(z) be the ordinary generating function for p_{i}:

$$h(z)=p_0+p_1z+p_2z^2+\cdots. \,$$

Using the generating function, the previous equation becomes

$$d_m=h(d_{m-1}). \,$$

Since d_{m} → d, d can be found by solving

$$d=h(d). \,$$

This is also equivalent to finding the intersection point(s) of lines y = z and y = h(z) for z ≥ 0. y = z is a straight line. y = h(z) is an increasing (since $h'(z) = p_1 + 2 p_2 z + 3 p_3 z^2 + \cdots \geq 0$) and convex (since $h''(z) = 2 p_2 + 6 p_3 z + 12 p_4 z^2 + \cdots \geq 0$) function. There are at most two intersection points. Since (1,1) is always an intersect point for the two functions, there only exist three cases:

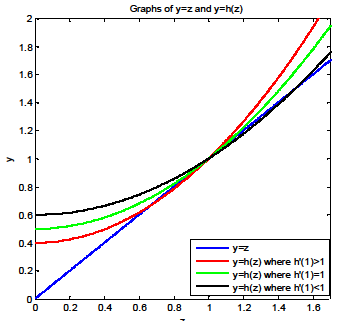
Three cases of y = h(z) intersecting with y = z.

1. There is another intersection point at z < 1 (see the red curve in the graph).
2. There is only one intersection point at z = 1.(See the green curve in the graph)
3. There is another intersection point at z > 1.(See the black curve in the graph)

In case 1, the ultimate extinction probability is strictly less than one. For case 2 and 3, the ultimate extinction probability equals to one.

By observing that h′(1) = p_{1} + 2p_{2} + 3p_{3} + ... = μ is exactly the expected number of offspring a parent could produce, it can be concluded that for a branching process with generating function h(z) for the number of offspring of a given parent, if the mean number of offspring produced by a single parent is less than or equal to one, then the ultimate extinction probability is one. If the mean number of offspring produced by a single parent is greater than one, then the ultimate extinction probability is strictly less than one.

== Example of extinction problem ==
Consider a parent can produce at most two offspring. The extinction probability in each generation is:

$$d_m=p_0+p_1d_{m-1}+p_2(d_{m-1})^2. \,$$

with d_{0} = 0. For the ultimate extinction probability, we need to find d which satisfies d = p_{0} + p_{1}d + p_{2}d^{2}.

Taking as example probabilities for the numbers of offspring produced p_{0} = 0.1, p_{1} = 0.6, and p_{2} = 0.3, the extinction probability for the first 20 generations is as follows:

Generation # (1–10)	Extinction probability	Generation # (11–20)	Extinction probability
1	0.1	11	0.3156
2	0.163	12	0.3192
3	0.2058	13	0.3221
4	0.2362	14	0.3244
5	0.2584	15	0.3262
6	0.2751	16	0.3276
7	0.2878	17	0.3288
8	0.2975	18	0.3297
9	0.3051	19	0.3304
10	0.3109	20	0.331

In this example, we can solve algebraically that d = 1/3, and this is the value to which the extinction probability converges with increasing generations.

== Multitype branching processes ==
In multitype branching processes, individuals are not identical, but can be classified into n types. After each time step, an individual of type i will produce individuals of different types, and $\mathbf{X}_i$, a random vector representing the numbers of children in different types, satisfies a probability distribution on $\mathbb{N}^n$.

For example, consider the population of cancer stem cells (CSCs) and non-stem cancer cells (NSCCs). After each time interval, each CSC has probability $p_1$ to produce two CSCs (symmetric division), probability $p_2$ to produce one CSC and one NSCC (asymmetric division), probability $p_3$ to produce one CSC (stagnation), and probability $1-p_1-p_2-p_3$ to produce nothing (death); each NSCC has probability $p_4$ to produce two NSCCs (symmetric division), probability $p_5$ to produce one NSCC (stagnation), and probability $1-p_4-p_5$ to produce nothing (death).

=== Law of large numbers for multitype branching processes ===
For multitype branching processes that the populations of different types grow exponentially, the proportions of different types converge almost surely to a constant vector as long as the expectation-matrix satisfies the conditions of the Perron-Frobenius theorem (irreducibility and primitivity). This is the strong law of large numbers for multitype branching processes.

For continuous-time cases, proportions of the population expectation satisfy an ODE system, which has a unique attracting fixed point. This fixed point is just the vector that the proportions converge to in the law of large numbers.

The monograph by Athreya and Ney summarizes a common set of conditions under which this law of large numbers is valid. Later there are some improvements through discarding different conditions.

== See also ==
- Galton–Watson process
- Random tree
- Branching random walk
- Resource-dependent branching process
- Bruss–Duerinckx theorem
- Martingale (probability theory)
- Superprocess
