= Bruss–Duerinckx theorem =

The theorem of the envelopment of societies for resource-dependent populations, also called the Bruss–Duerinckx theorem, is a mathematical result on the behavior of populations that choose their society form according to only two hypotheses that they see as most "natural":

- Hypothesis 1 (H1): Individuals want to survive and see a future for their descendants.
- Hypothesis 2 (H2): The average individual prefers a higher standard of living to a lower one.

H1 is supposed to precede H2 in the case of incompatibility with H2.

Here populations with a society structure are modeled by so-called resource-dependent branching processes (RDBPs). The objective of RDBPs is to model different society structures and to compare the advantages and disadvantages of different societies, with the focus being on human societies. A RDBP is a discrete time branching process (BP) in which individuals are supposed to have to work to be able to live and to reproduce. The population decides on a current society form by a policy, that is a prescription of rules how available resources are to be distributed among the individuals. Policies may change over the generations by the interaction of individuals.

== Adapting the model to reality ==
To model a human society, a RDBP incorporates a part from an initial state (number of ancestors at time 0) individual demands for resources (standard of living), creation (production) of new resources for the next generation (including non-consumption and heritage of resources), a policy to distribute resources, and a control option for individuals interacting with the society. For simplicity the reproduction in a RDBP is modeled as being asexual, but the option to replace the mean reproduction rate by the so-called average reproduction rate of mating units (see Galton-Watson processes and ref. 1984) allows to show that the main results given below are not affected by this simplification.

Formally, a RDBP is a stochastic process Γ defined on the non-negative integers, which is a BP defined by an:

- Initial state Γ_{0}
- Law of reproduction of individuals (asexual)
- Law of individual creation of resources
- Law of individual resource demands (claims)
- Policy to distribute available resources to individuals in the population
- Tool of interaction between individuals and society

== Tractable RDBPs ==
Models for the development of a human society in time must allow for interdependence between the different components. Such models are in general very complicated. Crucial in the development of the results was the idea not to try to model the development of a society with a (single) realistic RDBP but rather by a sequence of RDBPs respecting H1 and H2, that is by control actions defining at each time of control a relevant short-horizon RDBP. Thus RDBPs serve as locally defined models for the short-term behavior of a society whereas the evolution of a society is seen as a sequence of RDBPs controlled by the interaction of individuals. The tool of interaction for the individuals within each generation is the option to emigrate before reproduction (generating children) if their individual resource claims are not met by the current society form. Emigration can here be replaced by other options of protest.

== Special policies ==
It turns out that two special policies stand out as guidelines for the development of any society. These are the so-called weakest-first policy (wf-policy) and the so-called strongest-first policy (sf-policy) defined in resource-dependent branching process. It can be argued that the wf-society shares important features of an extreme form of communism whereas the sf-society can similarly be interpreted as an extreme form of capitalism.

Let:

m = mean reproduction (descendants) per individual
r = mean production (resource creation) per individual
F = the individual probability distribution of claims (resources)

Then using a result on the behavior of stopping times of sums of order statistics (ref. 1991) the survival criteria can be explicitly computed for both the wf-society and the sf-society as a function of m, r and F.

== Main result ==
The theorem of the envelopment of societies says:

1. In the long run, any society is bound to live between the wf-society and the sf-society.
2. The two extreme societies are attractive on the one hand but repulsive on the other hand:
  1. The wf-society does everything for Hypothesis 1 but nothing for Hypothesis 2. It has a larger probability of survival than any other society but also the smallest average standard of living for individuals.
  2. The sf-society does everything for Hypothesis 2 but nothing for Hypothesis 1. It has the largest average standard of living for individuals compared to any other society, but (at least from a sufficiently large initial size onwards) the smallest chance of survival.
3. Whatever the society, with fixed rules or flexible rules, it cannot possibly escape in the long run the envelope defined by the wf-society and the sf-society.

== Remark on the proof ==
Intuition why the above theorem should be true, is only partially true and sometimes completely wrong (explicit counterexamples). This is why this result has attracted much attention. The mathematical proof does not use new mathematical methods but is subtle. Apart from a classical result on so-called complete convergence, it is mainly based on theorems for stopping times on sums of independent and identically distributed order statistics (ref. 1991) and fine-tuned balancing acts between model assumptions and convergence in probability and almost sure convergence.

== Impact ==
The theorem allows for several conclusions, but the most challenging one is arguably the following. If one sees RDBPs with the two natural hypotheses as being an acceptable model, then the wf-policy and the sf-policy (arguably seen as an idealized form or extreme form of communism and (an extreme form of) capitalism, respectively) play both a particular role. They are both guidelines for any human society following the natural hypotheses. They cannot be stable societies: Extreme communism cannot be stable because individuals would like to go towards an increased standard of living, that is, towards H2. Extreme Capitalism cannot be stable because, unless resources are abundant, it would either die out or be quickly outnumbered by competing societies streaming into the vacuum.

However both form in the long run (in terms of the effective of populations) an envelope of any society whatever sophisticated its policy may be.
