= Accreditation Organisation of the Netherlands and Flanders =

The Accreditation Organisation of the Netherlands and Flanders (Dutch: Nederlands-Vlaamse Accreditatieorganisatie; NVAO) is the independent educational accreditation organisation for higher education institutions in the Netherlands and Flanders. It was established by international treaty by the Dutch government and the Flemish government in Belgium, for the purpose of ensuring the quality of higher education in the Netherlands and Flanders by accrediting study programmes.

The Accreditation Organisation of the Netherlands and Flanders (NVAO) was established in 2005 by the Dutch and Flemish governments as an independent accreditation organisation tasked with providing an expert and objective assessment of the quality of higher education in the Netherlands and Flanders.

NVAO is an international body established by treaty, which is recognised as a legal entity under Dutch public law, in accordance with the Treaty of 3 September 2003 between the Kingdom of the Netherlands and the Flemish Community of Belgium concerning the accreditation of Dutch and Flemish higher education programmes.

== Legal framework ==
The Dutch and Flemish accreditation systems stem from the agreements reached among the European Ministers of Education to establish a European Higher Education Area (EHEA). In the European regions concerned, they agreed to establish a Bachelor's/Master's degree structure in higher education and to introduce an independent accreditation system.

The Kingdom of the Netherlands and the Flemish Community of Belgium signed a Treaty on 3 September 2003 concerning the accreditation of Dutch and Flemish higher education programmes in order to establish a common accreditation organisation.

As of 1 February 2005, the independent Accreditation Organisation of the Netherlands and Flanders (NVAO) became an international body established by treaty that has the status of a legal entity under Dutch public law. The tasks and work method of NVAO in the Netherlands and in Flanders are set down in legislation. In the Netherlands, the tasks of NVAO are based on the "Higher Education and Research Act" (Wet Hoger Onderwijs en Wetenschappelijk Onderzoek, WHW), in Flanders, the operation of NVAO is established by the "Decree on Higher Education" of 4 April 2003.

== International policy ==
NVAO exchanges ideas and collaborates with stakeholders, such as governments, universities of applied sciences (NL) / university colleges (FL), research universities, and representatives of student organisations and umbrella organisations in the Netherlands, Flanders, Europe and beyond concerning the quality and the quality assurance of (international) higher education.

NVAO is recognised and accredited as a bi-national accreditation organisation. It performs its tasks in an international perspective, within the context of the European Bologna process and in accordance with the European Standards and Guidelines for Quality Assurance.

At European level NVAO is registered in the European Quality Assurance Register for Higher Education (EQAR); member, Board member, and providing the secretariat of the European Consortium for Accreditation in higher education (ECA); full member of the European Association for Quality Assurance in Higher Education (ENQA); full member of the International Network for Quality Assurance Agencies in Higher Education (INQAAHE).

== Criticism ==
Some commentators are sceptical about the usefulness of NVAO and similar accreditation organs. Thus Bram Delen, student at the KU Leuven even calls it a "classical example of useless bureaucracy", writing in the student paper Veto that the funds spent by NVAO on the "validation" of the work of visitation committees could have been better spent on the core tasks of the university, namely research, teaching and social service. Prof. Arnold Heertje and Anne Marie Oudemans have argued, in response to an appeal by Karl Dittrich, former Chair of NVAO, that the process bureaucracy of NVAO is swallowing up substantial funds, especially in the field of Higher Professional Education, without producing reliable results. But a full debate on the role and effects of the operation of NVAO has yet to take place.

== See also ==
- Education in the Netherlands
- Education in Flanders
