= Academic grading in Belgium =

Education in Belgium is organised on the level of the three communities.

== French Community of Belgium ==
=== Higher education ===
The approximate following grade scale applies to university and college students:

Grade	Average grade (percentage)	Used scale (0-20 scale)
La plus grande distinction	Excellent (90% – 100%)	18 – 20
Grande distinction	Very Good (80% – 89%)	16 – 17,9
Distinction	Good (70% – 79%)	14 – 15,9
Satisfaction	Satisfactory (60% – 69%)	12 – 13,9
Passable	Sufficient (50% – 59%)	10 – 11,9
Échec	Failure (< 50%)	< 10

Grades for each course in the French Community's higher education system are noted on 20, with pass set at 10.

The grades on 20 and the percentages in brackets vary from one university/college to another and can even be different for different faculties within the same institution.

Academic grading does not occur at the end of each year anymore, but rather at the level of the entire degree.

=== Secondary education ===
Secondary school grades are delivered in percentages, with pass at 50% (sometimes 60%, i.e. for French language courses). While most secondary schools have suppressed honours and ranking of pupils, some still use them, like the Athénée Robert Catteau in Brussels, which uses a roughly equivalent system to universities, at the end of each year:

- Plus grande distinction: 90% – 100%
- Grande distinction: 80% – 89,9%
- Distinction: 70% – 79,9%
- Satisfaction: 60% – 69,9%
- Pass without honours: 50% – 59,9%
- Fail: < 50%

== Flemish Community of Belgium ==
=== Higher education ===
In Flanders each university has a different grading system, though most grade on a scale of 20 with 10/20 being the passing grade. At UGent the following grading system applies to higher education:

- niet geslaagd (Failure): if the student gets a score lower than 10/20 for one or more courses.
- voldoening (Sufficient): if the student gets a score of at least 10/20 for all courses.
- onderscheiding (Good): if the student gets an average weighted score of at least 13.5/20.
- grote onderscheiding (Very Good): if the student gets an average weighted score of at least 15/20.
- grootste onderscheiding (Excellent): if the student gets an average weighted score of at least 16.5/20.

At the other main Flemish university, KU Leuven, the following levels of achievement are used:

- Cum fructu: if you have obtained a weighted percentage between 50% and 68%
- Cum laude: if you have obtained a weighted percentage of at least 68%
- Magna cum laude: if you have obtained a weighted percentage of at least 77%
- Summa cum laude: if you have obtained a weighted percentage of at least 85%
- Summa cum laude with the congratulations of the examination committee: if you have obtained a weighted percentage of at least 90%

The number of students that receive each level of achievement varies greatly between different faculties and is hard to reliably generalize for the entire university.
