= Extinction probability =

In population genetics, extinction probability is the chance of an inherited trait becoming extinct as a function of time t. If t = ∞ this may be the complement of the chance of becoming a universal trait. This opposing process is also known as proceeding to fixation.
