= First School War =

Political crisis in Belgium over the issue of religion in education

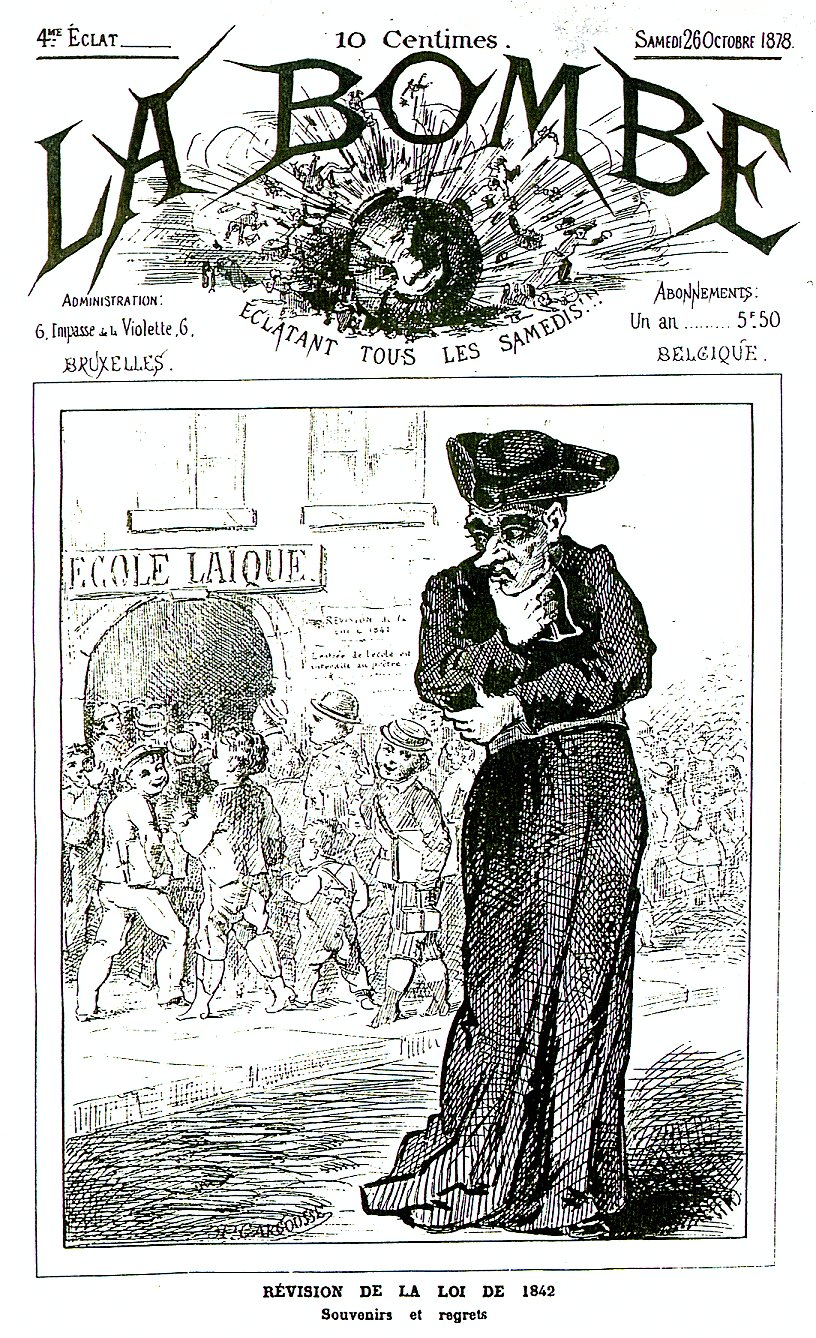
Cover of the satirical magazine La Bombe of October 1878, depicting Catholic disapproval of the new secular schools.

The First School War (French: Première guerre scolaire, Dutch: Eerste schoolstrijd) was a political crisis in Belgium over the issue of religion in education. The School War marks the high water mark of the conflict between the conservative Catholic Party, and the secular Liberal Party. The war lasted from 1879 to 1884 and resulted in a period of nearly fifty years of Catholic political dominance. It was followed by a Second School War between 1950 and 1959.

== Background ==
In the preceding centuries, education in Belgium had been dominated by the Catholic Church. In 1842, a new education law formalized religious education in primary schools, while also conceding the freedom of education guaranteed in Article 17 of the Constitution of 1831: Under the terms of Article 6 of the Education Act of 1842:

"Primary education includes by necessity the teaching of religion and morality... The instruction of religion and morality is placed under the direction of the officials of the religious faith that is professed by the majority of pupils at the school. Children who do not belong to the majority religious group in the school are exempt from participation in this instruction."

In practice, the interpretation of the law varied and, since the vast majority of the Belgian population was Catholic, the Church was allowed considerable influence in schools. The quality and spread of education remained poor and, though declining from 51 percent in 1843, 39 percent of the population were still illiterate by 1880.

== Crisis ==
On 1 June 1879, a Liberal majority under Walthère Frère-Orban succeeded in passing an Education Act secularizing primary education. Frère-Orban, who was well known for his anti-clerical beliefs, was nicknamed the "Papist Biter" (Papenvreter). New "neutral" schools were to be established in all municipalities, funded by the local communes with assistance from national government, while Catholic schools were to receive no support at all. The Church encouraged a boycott of the new schools. By 1883, although 3,885 secular schools had opened across the country, attendance in private Catholic schools had actually risen from 13 percent to over 60 percent.

After fresh elections in 1884, a Catholic government under Jules Malou passed a new Education Law providing public support for religious schools and, in 1895, religious education became compulsory in all schools.

== Legacy ==
The resistance to the Liberal anti-Catholic legislation revitalised the Catholic Party and led to its re-election under Malou in 1884 and marked the start of a period of nearly unbroken government by the Catholic Party until 1917. Disputes over religion in education continued, extending to university education, where secular universities like the Free University of Brussels competed with Catholic universities like the Catholic University of Leuven.

In an 1881 encyclical to Belgium, Licet Multa, issued before the resolution of the crisis, Pope Leo XIII praised the opposition of Catholics to the education act: "It is pleasant for us to give special praise to your solicitude in encouraging by all the means possible a good education for the young, and in insuring to the children of the primary schools a religious education established on broad foundations." Rerum novarum issued in 1891 encouraged Catholics to embrace the Church's social mission and to increase its engagement in activities such as education, welfare, and trades unionism that affected the working class.

In 1914, primary education (between the age of six and 14) was declared compulsory and free, and, by then, the level of illiteracy had fallen to eight percent.

== See also ==
- Roman Catholicism in Belgium
- Second School War in Belgium (1950–59)
- Jules Ferry laws, establishing secular education in France (1881–82)
- Kulturkampf in the German Empire (1871–1878)
