= Superprocess =

Concept in probability theory

In probability theory, a superprocess is a measure-valued stochastic process that is usually constructed as a special limit of near-critical branching diffusions.

Informally, a superprocess can be seen as a branching process where each particle splits and dies at infinite rates, and evolves in a state space E according to a diffusion equation. We follow the rescaled population of particles, seen as a measure on E.

== Scaling limit of a discrete branching process ==
=== Simplest setting ===
Branching Brownian process for N=30

For any integer $N\geq 1$, consider a branching Brownian process $Y^N(t,dx)$ defined as follows:

- Start at $t=0$ with $N$ independent particles distributed according to a probability distribution $\mu$.
- Each particle independently move according to a Brownian motion.
- Each particle independently dies with rate $N$.
- When a particle dies, with probability $1/2$ it gives birth to two offspring in the same location.

The notation $Y^N(t,dx)$ means should be interpreted as: at each time $t$, the number of particles in a set $A\subset \mathbb{R}$ is $Y^N(t,A)$. In other words, $Y$ is a measure-valued random process.

Now, define a rescaled process:

$X^N(t,dx):=\frac{1}{N}Y^N(t,dx)$

Then the finite-dimensional distributions of $X^N$ converge as $N\to +\infty$ to those of a measure-valued random process $X(t,dx)$, which is called a $(\xi,\phi)$-superprocess, with initial value $X(0) = \mu$, where $\phi(z):= \frac{z^2}{2}$ and where $\xi$ is a Brownian motion (specifically, $\xi=(\Omega,\mathcal{F},\mathcal{F}_t,\xi_t,\textbf{P}_x)$ where $(\Omega,\mathcal{F})$ is a measurable space, $(\mathcal{F}_t)_{t\geq 0}$ is a filtration, and $\xi_t$ under $\textbf{P}_x$ has the law of a Brownian motion started at $x$).

As will be clarified in the next section, $\phi$ encodes an underlying branching mechanism, and $\xi$ encodes the motion of the particles. Here, since $\xi$ is a Brownian motion, the resulting object is known as a Super-brownian motion.

=== Generalization to (ξ, ϕ)-superprocesses ===
Our discrete branching system $Y^N(t,dx)$ can be much more sophisticated, leading to a variety of superprocesses:

- Instead of $\mathbb{R}$, the state space can now be any Lusin space $E$.
- The underlying motion of the particles can now be given by $\xi=(\Omega,\mathcal{F},\mathcal{F}_t,\xi_t,\textbf{P}_x)$, where $\xi_t$ is a càdlàg Markov process (see, Chapter 4, for details).
- A particle dies at rate $\gamma_N$
- When a particle dies at time $t$, located in $\xi_t$, it gives birth to a random number of offspring $n_{t,\xi_t}$. These offspring start to move from $\xi_t$. We require that the law of $n_{t,x}$ depends solely on $x$, and that all $(n_{t,x})_{t,x}$ are independent. Set $p_k(x)=\mathbb{P}[n_{t,x}=k]$ and define $g$ the associated probability-generating function:$g(x,z):=\sum\limits_{k=0}^\infty p_k(x)z^k$

Add the following requirement that the expected number of offspring is bounded:
$$\sup\limits_{x\in E}\mathbb{E}[n_{t,x}]<+\infty$$
Define $X^N(t,dx):=\frac{1}{N}Y^N(t,dx)$ as above, and define the following crucial function:
$$\phi_N(x,z):=N\gamma_N \left[g_N\Big(x,1-\frac{z}{N}\Big)\,-\,\Big(1-\frac{z}{N}\Big)\right]$$
Add the requirement, for all $a\geq 0$, that $\phi_N(x,z)$ is Lipschitz continuous with respect to $z$ uniformly on $E\times [0,a]$, and that $\phi_N$ converges to some function $\phi$ as $N\to +\infty$ uniformly on $E\times [0,a]$.

Provided all of these conditions, the finite-dimensional distributions of $X^N(t)$ converge to those of a measure-valued random process $X(t,dx)$ which is called a $(\xi,\phi)$-superprocess, with initial value $X(0) = \mu$.

==== Commentary on ϕ ====
Provided $\lim_{N\to+\infty}\gamma_N = +\infty$, that is, the number of branching events becomes infinite, the requirement that $\phi_N$ converges implies that, taking a Taylor expansion of $g_N$, the expected number of offspring is close to 1, and therefore that the process is near-critical.

=== Generalization to Dawson-Watanabe superprocesses ===
The branching particle system $Y^N(t,dx)$ can be further generalized as follows:

- The probability of death in the time interval $[r,t)$ of a particle following trajectory $(\xi_t)_{t\geq 0}$ is $\exp\left\{-\int_r^t\alpha_N(\xi_s)K(ds)\right\}$ where $\alpha_N$ is a positive measurable function and $K$ is a continuous functional of $\xi$ (see, chapter 2, for details).
- When a particle following trajectory $\xi$ dies at time $t$, it gives birth to offspring according to a measure-valued probability kernel $F_N(\xi_{t-},d\nu)$. In other words, the offspring are not necessarily born on their parent's location. The number of offspring is given by $\nu(1)$. Assume that $\sup\limits_{x\in E}\int \nu(1)F_N(x,d\nu)<+\infty$.

Then, under suitable hypotheses, the finite-dimensional distributions of $X^N(t)$ converge to those of a measure-valued random process $X(t,dx)$ which is called a Dawson-Watanabe superprocess, with initial value $X(0) = \mu$.

== Properties ==
A superprocess has a number of properties. It is a Markov process, and its Markov kernel $Q_t(\mu,d\nu)$ verifies the branching property:
$$Q_t(\mu+\mu',\cdot) = Q_t(\mu,\cdot)*Q_t(\mu',\cdot)$$
where $*$ is the convolution.A special class of superprocesses are $(\alpha,d,\beta)$-superprocesses, with $\alpha\in (0,2],d\in \N,\beta \in (0,1]$. A $(\alpha,d,\beta)$-superprocesses is defined on $\R^d$. Its branching mechanism is defined by its factorial moment generating function (the definition of a branching mechanism varies slightly among authors, some use the definition of $\phi$ in the previous section, others use the factorial moment generating function):

$$\Phi(s) = \frac{1}{1+\beta}(1-s)^{1+\beta}+s$$

and the spatial motion of individual particles (noted $\xi$ in the previous section) is given by the $\alpha$-symmetric stable process with infinitesimal generator $\Delta_{\alpha}$.

The $\alpha = 2$ case means $\xi$ is a standard Brownian motion and the $(2,d,1)$-superprocess is called the super-Brownian motion.

One of the most important properties of superprocesses is that they are intimately connected with certain nonlinear partial differential equations. The simplest such equation is $\Delta u-u^2=0\ on\ \mathbb{R}^d.$ When the spatial motion (migration) is a diffusion process, one talks about a superdiffusion. The connection between superdiffusions and nonlinear PDE's is similar to the one between diffusions and linear PDE's.

== Further resources ==
- Eugene B. Dynkin (2004). Superdiffusions and positive solutions of nonlinear partial differential equations. Appendix A by J.-F. Le Gall and Appendix B by I. E. Verbitsky. University Lecture Series, 34. American Mathematical Society. ISBN 9780821836828.
