= Second School War =

Political crisis in Belgium over the issue of religion in education

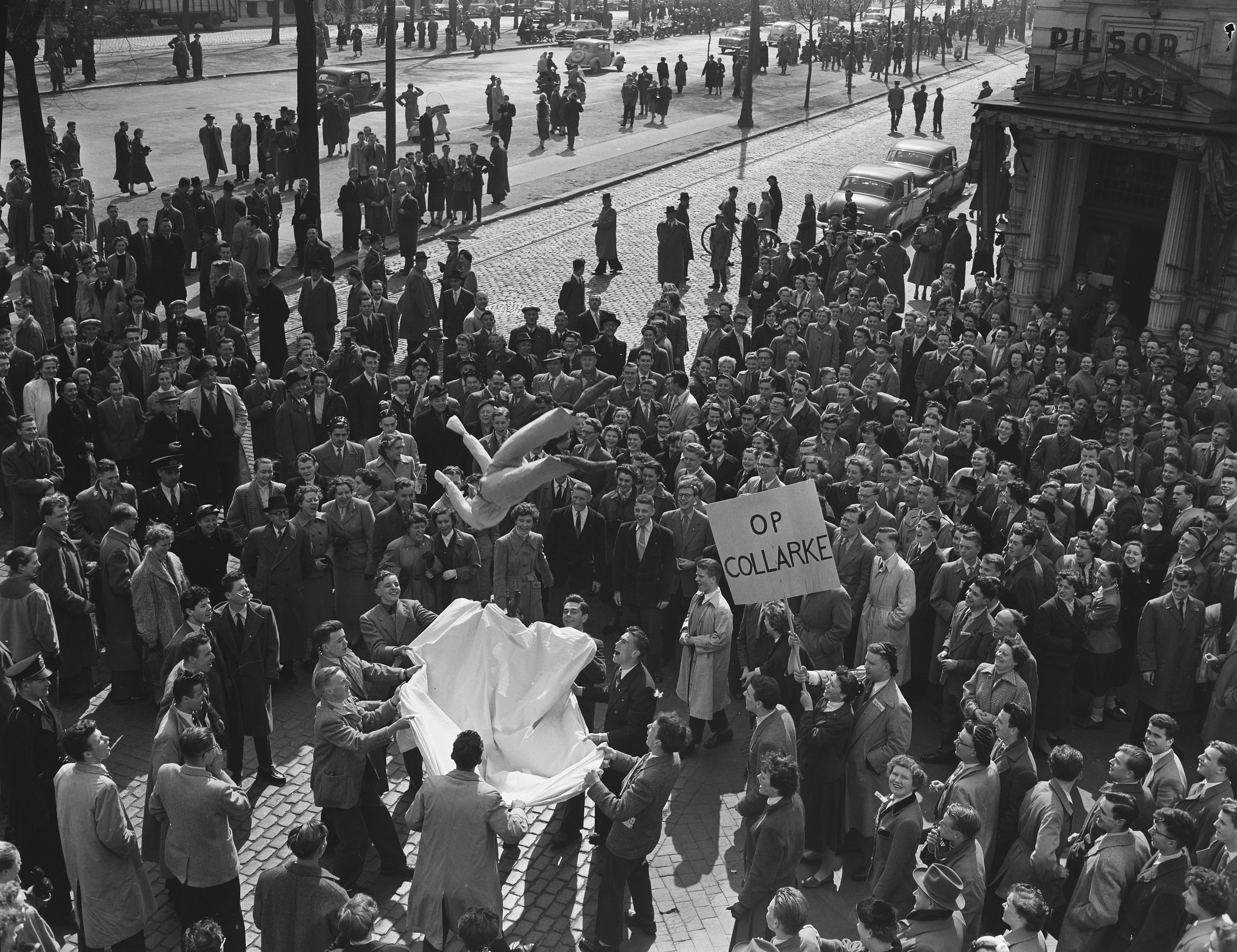
A Catholic demonstration against the Collard law in Antwerp in 1955

The Second School War (French: Deuxième guerre scolaire, Dutch: Tweede schoolstrijd) was a political crisis in Belgium over the issue of religion in education between 1954 and 1958. The "war" was ended by a cross-party agreement, known as the School Pact, which clarified the role of religion in the state. It followed a crisis over the same issue in the 19th century, known as the First School War.

== Crisis ==
After victory in the 1950 elections, a Christian Social Party (PSC-CVP) majority government came to power in Belgium for the first time since the end of World War II. The new education minister, Pierre Harmel, used the PSC-CVP's position to increase the wages paid to teachers in private, mainly Catholic, schools and introduced laws linking the subsidies for private schools to the number of pupils. These measures were perceived by the traditionally anticlerical liberals and socialists as a "declaration of war" on the traditionally contentious issue of religion in education.

The 1954 elections pushed the PSC-CVP out of government for the first time in the post-war era. It brought to power a Liberal-Socialist coalition under Achille Van Acker. The new socialist Minister of Education, Leo Collard, immediately set out to reverse the measures taken by Harmel, founding a large number of secular schools and only permitting the instatement of teachers with a diploma which forced many unqualified priests out of the profession. These measures sparked mass protests from Belgian Catholics.

After the 1958 elections, the PSC-CVP was returned to power with a minority government under Gaston Eyskens. The School War was concluded by an agreement, known as the School Pact, on 6 November 1958.

== School Pact ==
The conflict was resolved by the School Pact (Pacte scolaire / Schoolpact), signed on 6 November 1958 and ratified by Parliament in 1959. The agreement guaranteed parents the right to choose between state schools and private (mainly Catholic) schools. Both networks received public subsidies, teacher salaries were standardised, and state inspection was applied to all recognised schools.

The pact established a long-term compromise intended to end political conflict over education. While it was accepted as a settlement by the main political parties, it did not meet all expectations. Some Catholic leaders, including Cardinal Van Roey, expressed reservations about the agreement.

== See also ==
- Royal Question (1944–50)
- Belgian general strike of 1960–1961
- Roman Catholicism in Belgium
