= Dionigi Galletto =

Italian mathematician and academician

- Born: 26 January 1932; Monasterolo di Savigliano , Italy
- Died: 25 September 2011 (aged 79); Turin, Italy
- Education: University of Padua
- Awards: Premio Ottorino Pomini of the Unione Matematica Italiana (1965); Premio del Ministro per i Beni Culturali e Ambientali (1989)
- Scientific career
- Fields: Mathematics; Mathematical physics
- Workplaces: University of Palermo; University of Turin
- Doctoral advisor: Giuseppe Grioli
- Other academic advisors: Francesco Severi
- Doctoral students: Mauro Francaviglia

Dionigi Galletto (26 January 1932 – 25 September 2011) was an Italian mathematician and academician.

He is known for his work on rigid body mechanics, on the mathematical theory of elasticity (including both linear elasticity and finite strain theory), on the history of mathematics and on cosmology and extragalactic celestial mechanics: in particular he is considered one of the founders of the latter branch of cosmology.

He was professor of mathematical physics at the University of Turin: as such, he is considered to be the founder–reorganiser of the Mathematical physics school of Turin in the Post–Second World War period. Among his students was Mauro Francaviglia.

== Biography ==
He started his university studies in Rome as a student of Severi: however his studies were interrupted due to the military service, which led him to Padua. There he graduated with honours in 1960 under Giuseppe Grioli's guidance, with a thesis on the continuum theory with asymmetric stress: from 1961 to 1968 he worked in Padua as an associate professor, holding also courses on differential geometry as a lecturer.

In 1968, having won a competitive examination for a chair in rational mechanics, he was appointed extraordinary professor of rational mechanics at the University of Palermo: there, Galletto held also courses of mathematical methods for physicists as a lecturer. In 1970 he moved to the University of Turin, working at the Faculty of Mathematics, Physics and Natural Sciences again as extraordinary professor of higher mechanics: in 1971 he became full professor of mathematical physics, a position he held up to 2007, when he retired. Besides the course of mathematical physics, Galletto held various courses relating to the area of his scientific interest: for example he held courses on astronomy as a lecturer. In 2008 he was appointed Emeritus professor.

=== Honors ===
In 1965 he was awarded the Ottorino Pomini prize by the Unione Matematica Italiana, jointly with Giuseppe Geymonat and Mario Miranda: the judging commission was composed by Dario Graffi (as the president), Giuseppe Grioli, Ennio De Giorgi and Enzo Martinelli (as the secretary).

He was corresponding member of the Accademia delle Scienze di Torino since 1974, and became national resident member in 1980.

In 1979 he was elected corresponding member of the Accademia Nazionale di Scienze, Lettere e Arti di Modena: later on, he became effective member in 1984 and emeritus member in 2002. He was also corresponding member of the Istituto Lombardo Accademia di Scienze e Lettere.

Since 1980 he was corresponding member of the Accademia dei Lincei, and was elected national member in 1990. In 1989, the same academy awarded him the "Prize of the Minister of Heritage and Cultural Activity" for his work in mathematics and mechanics.

On November 2, 2006 he was elected member of the Serbian Academy of Sciences and Arts, and few months later, on 7 March 2007, he was elected corresponding non resident member to the class of mathematical sciences of the Società Nazionale di Scienze Lettere e Arti in Napoli.

== Work ==
=== Research activity ===
During his career, he published more than 150 papers in Italian and international journals. The beginning of his scientific production was under Grioli's scientific influence: Galletto worked on the topic of his laurea thesis, i.e. on the theory of continua having asymmetric stress characteristics. However, soon he followed his independent research path, with pioneering works that forerun the so called generalised continuum theory. In this theory, among other things, the stress tensor considered is no longer the Cauchy tensor or any similar, double symmetric tensor, but an asymmetric tensor that generalizes it: and this gives to the theory many further important structural peculiarities.

== Selected publications ==
=== Research works ===
- Galletto, Dionigi (January 1961), "Nuove forme per le equazioni in coordinate generali della statica dei continui con caratteristiche di tensione asimmetriche" [New forms for the static continuum equations in general coordinates and with asymmetric stress characteristics], Annali dell'Università di Ferrara, Serie III (in Italian), 10 (1): 33–68, doi:10.1007/BF02824732, ISSN 0430-3202, S2CID 117141579.
- Galletto, Dionigi (1963), "Intorno ad alcuni teoremi sulle matrici quadrate" [On some theorems on square matrices], Bollettino dell'Unione Matematica Italiana, Serie 3 (in Italian), 18 (2): 94–100, MR 0155840, Zbl 0122.25004.
- Galletto, Dionigi (1963a), "Nuove forme per le equazioni in coordinate generali della statica dei continui con caratteristiche di tensione asimmetriche" [New forms for the static continuum equations in general coordinates and with asymmetric stress characteristics], Annali della Scuola Normale Superiore di Pisa – Classe di Scienze, Serie III (in Italian), 17 (4): 297–317, MR 0166985, Zbl 0245.73002. A continuation of the work (Galletto 1961), with the same title.
- Galletto, Dionigi (1965), "Contributo allo studio dei sistemi continui a trasformazioni reversibili con caratteristiche di tensione asimmetriche" [Contribution to the study of continuous systems undergoing reversible transformations with asymmetric stress characteristics], Rendiconti del Seminario Matematico della Università di Padova (in Italian), 35 (2): 299–334, MR 0189316, Zbl 0139.42403.
- Galletto, Dionigi (1966), "Sistemi incomprimibili a trasformazioni reversibili nel caso asimmetrico (Parte prima)" [Incompressible systems undergoing reversible transformations with asymmetric stress (First part)], Rendiconti del Seminario Matematico della Università di Padova (in Italian), 36 (2): 243–276, Zbl 0146.21104.
- Galletto, Dionigi (1967), "Sistemi incomprimibili a trasformazioni reversibili nel caso asimmetrico (Parte seconda)" [Incompressible systems undergoing reversible transformations with asymmetric stress (Second part)], Rendiconti del Seminario Matematico della Università di Padova (in Italian), 37: 18–59, Zbl 0145.45202.
- Galletto, Dionigi (1967), "Sulla condizione di isotropia per i sistemi continui a trasformazioni reversibili" [On the isotropy condition for continuous systems undergoing reversible transformations], Rendiconti del Seminario Matematico della Università di Padova (in Italian), 37: 246–257, Zbl 0189.25203.
- Galletto, Dionigi (1968), "Sul vettore caratteristico della rotazione nei moti rigidi" [On the rotation characteristic vector in rigid motions], Rendiconti del Seminario Matematico della Università di Padova (in Italian), 40: 205–218, MR 0245878, Zbl 0258.70004.
- Galletto, Dionigi (1968), "Alcuni teoremi di cinematica dei sistemi rigidi" [Some theorems in the cinematic of rigid systems], Rendiconti del Seminario Matematico della Università di Padova (in Italian), 40: 219–226, MR 0245878.
- Galletto, Dionigi (1968), "Sulla potenza dello stress e sull'isotropia dei materiali iperelastici" [On the stress power and on the isotropy of hyperelastic materials], Rendiconti del Seminario Matematico della Università di Padova (in Italian), 40: 227–236, MR 0245878, Zbl 0179.55803.
- Galletto, Dionigi (1968), "Sui materiali iperelastici anisotropi" [On anisotropic hyperelastic materials], Rendiconti del Seminario Matematico della Università di Padova (in Italian), 40: 237–251, MR 0245878, Zbl 0179.55804.
- Galletto, Dionigi (1968), "Sulla deduzione del vettore caratteristico della rotazione nei moti rigidi" [On the deduction of the rotation characteristic vector in rigid motions], Rendiconti del Seminario Matematico della Università di Padova (in Italian), 41: 198–209, MR 0245878, Zbl 0194.56902.
- Galletto, Dionigi (1968), "Sull'energia complementare di deformazione per i materiali iperelastici" [On the complementary deformation energy for hyperelastic materials], Rendiconti del Seminario Matematico della Università di Padova (in Italian), 41: 210–221, MR 0245878, Zbl 0194.28503.
- Galletto, Dionigi (1979), "Una proprietà del campo Newtoniano" [A property of the Newtonian field] (PDF), Rivista di Matematica della Università di Parma, (4) (in Italian), 5^{*}/5^{**}: 739–744.
- Galletto, Dionigi (1982), "Premesse alla cosmologia razionale" [Premises to rational cosmology], Rendiconti del Seminario Matematico della Università di Padova (in Italian), 68: 295–324, MR 0702162.
- Galletto, Dionigi (1983), "Some Converse Theorems in Newtonian Field Theory and Their Applications", Applicable Analysis, 15 (1–4): 313–337, doi:10.1080/00036818308839453, MR 0710197, Zbl 0507.31002.
- Galletto, Dionigi; Barberis, Bruno (2002), "Modelli d'universo e propagazione della luce", in Capitani, Ovidio; Capriz, Gianfranco; Caputo, Michele; Fabrizio, Mauro; Graffi, Sandro; Grioli, Giuseppe; Podio Guidugli, Paolo; Renno, Pasquale (eds.), Nuovi progressi nella fisica matematica dall'eredità di Dario Graffi – Convegno Internazionale (Bologna, 24–27 maggio 2000), Atti dei Convegni Lincei (in Italian), vol. 177, Roma: Accademia Nazionale dei Lincei, pp. 99–151, ISBN 88-218-0868-8, ISSN 0391-805X. "Universe models and light propagation" (English translation of the title).

=== Biographical, commemorative and historical works ===
- Galletto, Dionigi (1982), "Il pensiero di Einstein nell'opera di Guido Fubini e Francesco Severi", Atti del convegno matematico in celebrazione della nascita di Guido Fubini e Francesco Severi. Torino, 8–10 Ottobre 1979, Atti della Accademia delle Scienze di Torino. I. Classe di Scienze Fisiche, Matematiche e Naturali, vol. 115, Turin: Accademia delle Scienze di Torino, pp. 205–216, MR 0727498, Zbl 0553.01012. "Einstein's thought in the work of Guido Fubini and Francesco Severi" (English translation of the title).
- Galletto, Dionigi (1990), "La figura e l'opera di Antonio Pignedoli" [The Life and Work of Antonio Pignedoli], Accademia Nazionale di Scienze, Lettere e Arti di Modena. Atti e Memorie, Serie VII (in Italian), VII — 1989-90: 1–12.
- Galletto, Dionigi (2007), "Ricordo di Gaetano Fichera a dieci anni dalla morte" [Recollection of Gaetano Fichera ten years after the death], Atti Ufficiali dell'Accademia delle Scienze di Torino (in Italian), 2004–2006: 135–142, available from the Accademia delle Scienze di Torino. A commemoration of Gaetano Fichera.
- Galletto, Dionigi; Barberis, Bruno (2008), "Euler e Lagrange", Leonhard Euler nel terzo centenario della nascita, Quaderni vol. 16 (in Italian), Turin: Accademia delle Scienze di Torino, pp. 61–81, ISBN 978-88-901608-2-0, ISSN 1125-0402, MR 2413007, Zbl 1191.01011, archived from the original on 2014-03-08.
- Galletto, Dionigi (2008), "Prolusione. Il "sistema del mondo" di Isaac Newton" [Prolusion. The "System of the World" of Isaac Newton], Atti della Accademia delle Scienze di Torino – Classe di Scienze Fisiche, Matematiche e Naturali (in Italian), 142: 13–20, ISSN 0001-4419, MR 2527968, Zbl 1200.01014.
