= Rendiconti di Matematica e delle sue Applicazioni =

- Discipline: Mathematics
- Language: English
- Edited by: Marco Manetti

Publication details
- Former names: Seminario Matematico della Regia Università di Roma: Rendiconti delle sedute; Rendiconti del Seminario Matematico della Regia Università di Roma; Rendiconti di Matematica
- History: 1913–present
- Publisher: "Guido Castelnuovo" Department of Mathematics, Sapienza University of Rome and Istituto Nazionale di Alta Matematica Francesco Severi (Italy)
- Frequency: Biannual
- Open access: Yes

Standard abbreviations
- ISO 4: Rend. Mat. Appl.

Indexing
- ISSN: 1120-7183 (print); 2532-3350 (web)
- OCLC no.: 499332312

Links
- Journal homepage; Online archive

The Rendiconti di Matematica e delle sue Applicazioni (Reports on Mathematics and its applications) is an open access peer-reviewed mathematics journal, jointly published by the "Guido Castelnuovo" Department of Mathematics of the Sapienza University of Rome and by the Istituto Nazionale di Alta Matematica Francesco Severi, established in 1913. The Journal started his publications a year after, in 1914, and his first director was Vito Volterra.

It publishes research articles in pure and applied mathematics, without imposing restrictions on the length of the work: for this reason, the submission of surveys, articles of foundational nature and doctoral dissertations is also encouraged. As in every peer reviewed journal, every article is refereed, and the journal adheres to the EMS Code of Practice.

The journal is abstracted and indexed by Mathematical Reviews, Zentralblatt MATH and Scopus.

== Historical notes ==
=== Foundation and the first four series ===
ART. I.
È fondato, presso la Facoltà di Scienze della R. Università di Roma, un Istituto avente lo scopo di diffondere la cultura matematica e di promuovere studi e ricerche matematiche. Esso prenderà il nome di «Seminario matematico».

— From the Rules of the seminar published in (Seminario Matematico della Facoltà di Scienze della R. Università di Roma 1914, p. 3).

The journal was founded in 1913 as the press organ of the "Seminario Matematico della Facoltà di Scienze della Reale Uninversità di Roma": its first director (Editor in chief) was Vito Volterra, who held this position from its foundation to the year 1921. The direction passed to Guido Castelnuovo who held it from 1921 to 1922: with the beginning of and during the publishing of the whole second and third series of the journal, from 1922 to 1935 Federigo Enriques was the director. During fourth series of the journal, at the starting of which it underwent its first name change, the direction passed to Gaetano Scorza, who held it until his death in 1939.

=== The INdAM and its influence ===
The founding of the Istituto Nazionale di Alta Matematica in 1939, under the decisive influence of Francesco Severi, had important consequences on the "Rendiconti del Seminario Matematico". On 23 November 1939, during its first meeting, the Scientific Council of the then newborn institute, considering the need of a means to publish the results of the research done by the members and the students working at the institute, decided to merge the needed means and the already existing journal in one single entity, giving birth to the "Rendiconti di Matematica e delle sue Applicazioni". Entrusted with this double function the fifth series of the journal, from the first volume published in 1940 to the first issue of the fourth volume published in 1943, included a section listing the programs of the INdAM courses of the current academic year as well as section listing the research problems proposed by the lecturers currently working at the institute.

=== Timeline of Journal series and editors in chief ===
Years	Journal series	Journal name	Editor in chief	Years in charge	References
1913–1922	Serie I	Seminario Matematico della Regia Università di Roma: Rendiconti delle sedute	Vito Volterra	1913–1921	(Ceccherini 1970, pp. I, IX)
1913–1922	Serie I	Seminario Matematico della Regia Università di Roma: Rendiconti delle sedute	Guido Castelnuovo	1921–1922	(Ceccherini 1970, pp. I, IX)
1922–1931	Serie II	Seminario Matematico della Regia Università di Roma: Rendiconti delle sedute	Federigo Enriques	1922–1935	(Ceccherini 1970, pp. IX, 9, 17)
1931–1935	Serie III	Seminario Matematico della Regia Università di Roma: Rendiconti delle sedute	Federigo Enriques	1922–1935	(Ceccherini 1970, pp. IX, 9, 17)
1936–1939	Serie IV	Rendiconti del Seminario Matematico della Regia Università di Roma	Gaetano Scorza	1936–1939	(Ceccherini 1970, pp. I, IX)
1940–1967	Serie V	Rendiconti di Matematica e delle sue Applicazioni	Francesco Severi, Enrico Bompiani and Fabio Conforto	1940–1954	(Ceccherini 1970, pp. I, IX)
1940–1967	Serie V	Rendiconti di Matematica e delle sue Applicazioni	Francesco Severi and Enrico Bompiani	1954–1959	(Ceccherini 1970, pp. I, IX)
1940–1967	Serie V	Rendiconti di Matematica e delle sue Applicazioni	Francesco Severi and Beniamino Segre	1960–1961	(Ceccherini 1970, pp. I, IX)
1940–1967	Serie V	Rendiconti di Matematica e delle sue Applicazioni	Beniamino Segre	1961–1972	(Ceccherini 1970, pp. I, IX), (Journal "Historical Notes"2016)
1968–1980	Serie VI	Rendiconti di Matematica	Beniamino Segre	1961–1972	(Ceccherini 1970, pp. I, IX), (Journal "Historical Notes"2016)
1968–1980	Serie VI	Rendiconti di Matematica	Gaetano Fichera and Aldo Ghizzetti	1973–1976	(Journal "Historical Notes"2016)
1968–1980	Serie VI	Rendiconti di Matematica	Aldo Ghizzetti	1976–1983	(Journal "Historical Notes"2016)
1981–present	Serie VII	Rendiconti di Matematica e delle sue Applicazioni	Aldo Ghizzetti	1976–1983	(Journal "Historical Notes"2016)
1981–present	Serie VII	Rendiconti di Matematica e delle sue Applicazioni	Paolo Emilio Ricci	1984–1985	(Journal "Historical Notes"2016)
1981–present	Serie VII	Rendiconti di Matematica e delle sue Applicazioni	Pietro Benvenuti and Paolo Emilio Ricci	1986–1995	(Journal "Historical Notes"2016)
1981–present	Serie VII	Rendiconti di Matematica e delle sue Applicazioni	Pietro Benvenuti	1996–2003	(Journal "Historical Notes"2016)
1981–present	Serie VII	Rendiconti di Matematica e delle sue Applicazioni	Alessandro Silva	2004–2015	(Journal "Historical Notes"2016)
1981–present	Serie VII	Rendiconti di Matematica e delle sue Applicazioni	Marco Manetti	2016–present	(Journal "Historical Notes"2016)

== See also ==
- Rendiconti del Seminario Matematico della Università di Padova
- Rendiconti del Seminario Matematico Università e Politecnico di Torino
- Rivista di Matematica della Università di Parma
