= Giovanni Battista Rizza =

Italian mathematician (1924–2018)

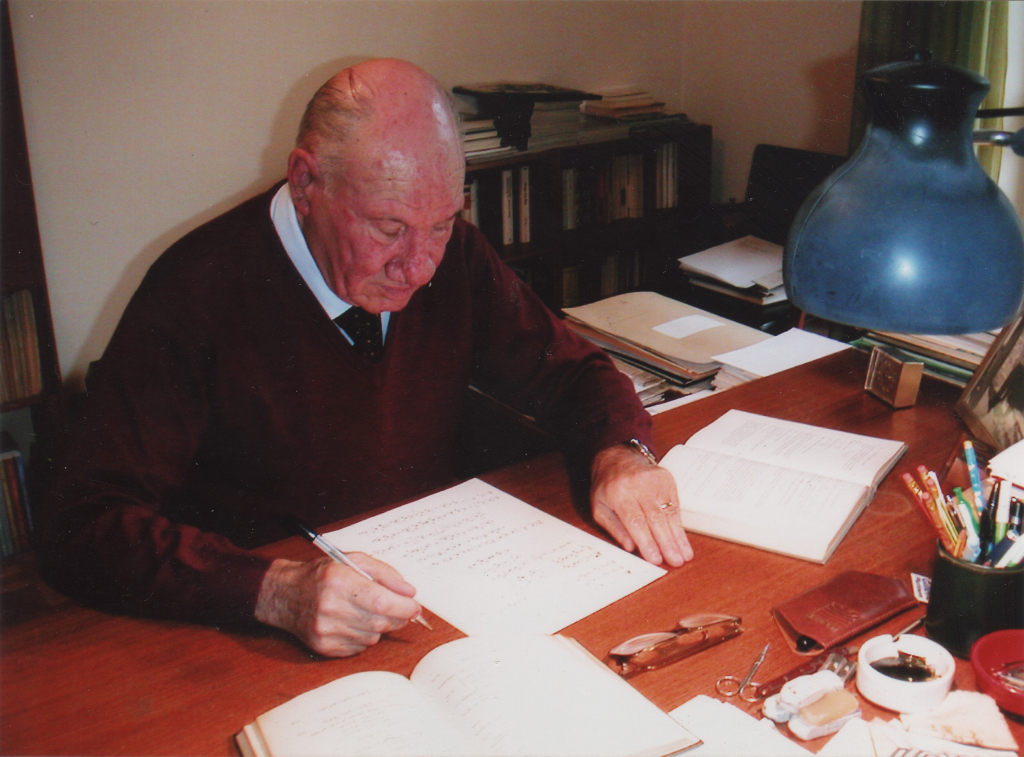
- Giovanni Battista Rizza at work in his home office, in 2003.
- Born: 7 February 1924; Piazza Armerina, Italy
- Died: 15 October 2018 (aged 94); Parma, Italy
- Education: Università degli Studi di Genova
- Known for: Integral representation of pluriharmonic functions; Rizza manifolds; Theory of functions on Algebras
- Spouse: Lucilla Bassotti
- Awards: Premio Ottorino Pomini of the Unione Matematica Italiana (1954), Golden medal "Benemeriti della Scuola, della Cultura, dell'Arte" (awarded by the President of the Italian Republic) (1973)
- Scientific career
- Fields: Hypercomplex analysis; Several complex variables; Differential geometry
- Workplaces: Università degli Studi di Genova; Istituto Nazionale di Alta Matematica; Sapienza University of Rome; Università degli Studi di Parma
- Doctoral advisor: Enzo Martinelli

Giovanni Battista Rizza (7 February 1924 – 15 October 2018), officially known as Giambattista Rizza, was an Italian mathematician, working in the fields of complex analysis of several variables and in differential geometry: he is known for his contribution to hypercomplex analysis, notably for extending Cauchy's integral theorem and Cauchy's integral formula to complex functions of a hypercomplex variable, the theory of pluriharmonic functions and for the introduction of the now called Rizza manifolds.

== Biography ==
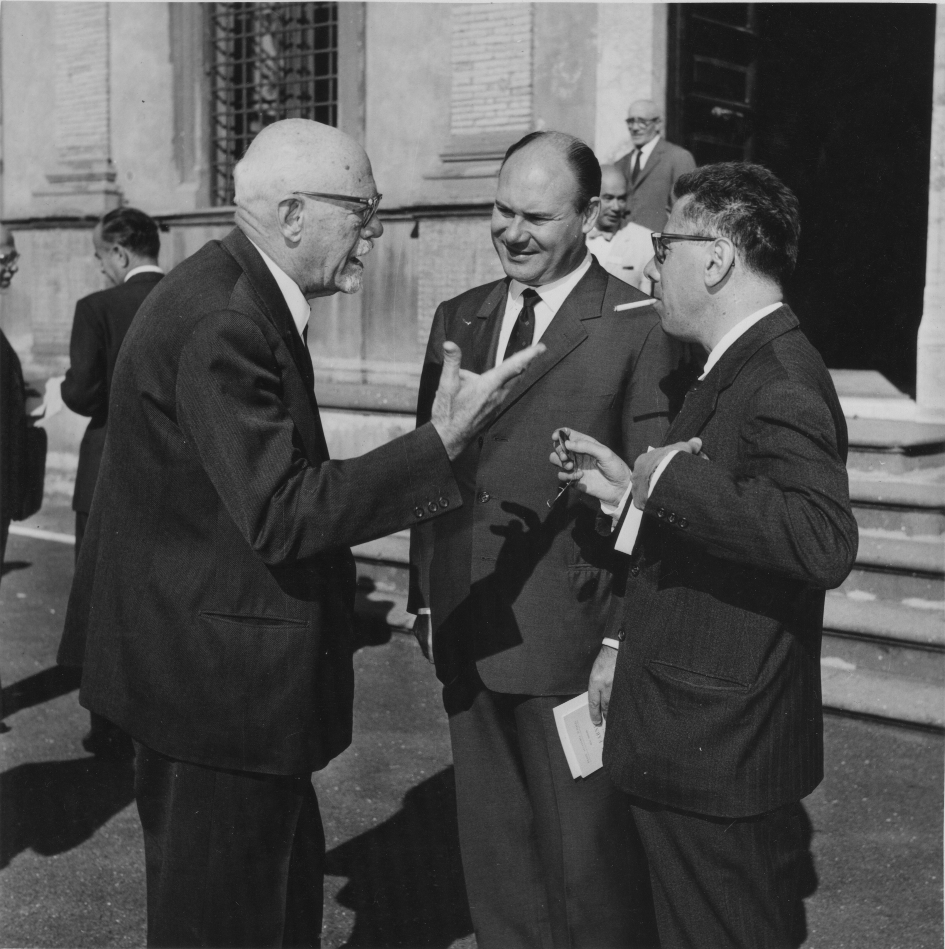
The International Symposium on Algebraic Geometry held in Rome in 1965. Enrico Bompiani talking to Giovanni Battista Rizza and Vittorio Dalla Volta.

=== Life and academic career ===
Born in Piazza Armerina, the son of Giovanni and Angioletta Bocciarelli, he graduated from the Università degli Studi di Genova, earning his laurea degree in 1949 under the direction of Enzo Martinelli. In 1956 he was in Rome at the INdAM, having been awarded a scholarship for his early research activities. A year later, in 1957, he was elected "discepolo ricercatore" in the same institute. During the same year, he gave some lectures on topics belonging to the field of several complex variables, later included in the lecture notes (Severi 1958). In Rome he also met Lucilla Bassotti, who eventually become his wife. In 1961, he won the competitive examination for the chair of "Geometria analitica con elementi di Geometria Proiettiva e Geometria Descrittiva con Disegno" of the University of Parma, scoring first out of the three finalists: a year later, in 1962, he became extraordinary professor, and then, in 1965, ordinary professor to the same chair. In 1979 he became ordinary professor of "Geometria superiore", holding that chair uninterruptedly until 1994: from 1994 up to his retirement in 1997, he was "professore fuori ruolo" in the same department of mathematics where he worked for more than 35 years.

Apart from his research and teaching work, he was actively involved as a member of the editorial board of the "Rivista di Matematica della Università di Parma", and served also as the journal director from 1992 to 1997.

Rizza died in Parma on 15 October 2018, at the age of 94.

=== Honors ===
In 1954 he was awarded the Ottorino Pomini prize by the Unione Matematica Italiana, jointly with Gabriele Darbo: the judging commission was composed by Giovanni Sansone (as the president), Alessandro Terracini, Beniamino Segre, Giuseppe Scorza-Dragoni, Carlo Miranda, Mario Villa and Enzo Martinelli (as the secretary).

In 1973 he was awarded the golden medal "Benemeriti della Scuola, della Cultura, dell'Arte" by the President of the Italian Republic, as an acknowledgement his research and teaching and achievements as civil servant at the University of Parma.

In 1995, to celebrate his 70th birthday, an international conference on differential geometry was organized in Parma: the proceedings were later published as a special issue of the "Rivista di Matematica della Università di Parma". In 1999 the University of Parma, where he worked for more than 35 years, awarded him the title of professor emeritus.

Rizza was an honorary member of the Balkan Society of Geometers and life member of the Tensor Society.

=== Personality traits ===
Enzo Martinelli described Giovanni Battista Rizza as a passionate researcher with a "strong intellectual force", and his scientific work as rich of geometrical ideas, denoting his strong algorithmic ability. According to Martinelli, Rizza is also a skilled organizer: his ability in organizational tasks is also acknowledged and praised by Schreiber (1973, p. 1), who also alludes the positive opinions of colleagues and students alike about his involvement in research, teaching and administrative duties at the mathematics department of the University of Parma.

== Work ==
=== Research activity ===
Giovanni Battista Rizza authored 53 research papers and 30 other scientific works, including research announcements, short notes, surveys and reports: he also wrote didactic notes and papers on historical topics, including commemorations of other scientists. His main fields of research were the theory of functions on algebras, the theory of functions of several complex variables, and differential geometry.

==== Theory of functions on algebras ====
The theory of functions on algebras, also referred to as hypercomplex analysis, is the study of functions whose domain is a subset of an algebra. The first works of Giovanni Battista Rizza belong to this field of research, and he was awarded the Premio Ottorino Pomini for his contributions.

His first main result is the extension of Cauchy's integral theorem to every monogenic function F on a general complex algebra A,

$$\int_{\Gamma_1} \mathrm{F}(\mathrm{X}) \mathrm{d}\mathrm{X}=0$$

where Γ_{1} is a 1-dimensional cycle homologous to zero, and also satisfying other technical conditions.

Few years later, he extended Cauchy's integral formula to every monogenic function F on a commutative normed real algebra A^{*}, isomorphic to a given complex algebra A: precisely, he proves the formula

$$\int_{\Gamma_1}\frac{\mathrm{F}(\mathrm{X})}{\mathrm{X}-\Xi}\mathrm{d}\mathrm{X}=2\pi i\sum^k_{s=1}\mathrm{N}^{(s)}u^{(s)}\mathrm{F}(\Xi)$$

where

- X ≡ x^{*} ≡ x identifies indifferently a point in the complex algebra A or in its isomorphic real algebra A^{*},
- Γ_{1} is again a 1-dimensional cycle homologous to zero, and satisfying other technical conditions,
- N^{(s)} is the winding number of the cycle Γ_{1} respect to the zero divisor locus for the considered algebra.

==== Theory of analytic functions of several complex variables ====
All'estensione, tutt'altro che banale, allo spazio R^{2n} dei metodi di Martinelli per dimostrare la (3), è dedicata una Memoria [8] di Giovanni Battista Rizza, il quale, sempre nell'ipotesi ρ(x_{1}, y_{1},..., x_{n}, y_{n}) ∈ C^{ω}, perviene a stabilire la (3) per n qualsiasi. Anche questo lavoro, per quanto redatto in lingua inglese e pubblicato su una delle principali riviste matematiche, non ha nella letteratura attuale, la notorietà che meriterebbe.

— Gaetano Fichera, (Fichera 1982a, p. 135).

Rizza published only three work in this field: in the first one, the highly remarkable memoir (Rizza 1955), he extends to pluriharmonic functions of 2n real variables, n > 2, the methods introduced by Enzo Martinelli in order to give new proof of a result of Luigi Amoroso for pluriharmonic functions of four real variables. Precisely, he proves the following formula

| $\frac{\partial u}{\partial \nu} = \frac{\vert\nabla \rho\vert^3}{Q(\rho)} E u$ | 1 |

where

- u is a polyharmonic function defined on a bounded domain Ω,
- ρ is a real analytic function defining the boundary of Ω by the equation

$$\partial\Omega = \{x\in\mathbb{R}^{2n}|\rho(x)=0\},$$

- Q(ρ) is a linear combination of the Levi forms of ρ relative to couples of complex variables,
- E is a linear tangential operator defined on ∂Ω.

Formula (1) express a condition the normal derivative of the boundary value of a pluriharmonic function on domain with real analytic boundary must satisfy. It can be used to construct an integral representation for pluriharmonic functions on such kind of domains, by using the Green's formula for the Laplacian, and also to establish an integro-differential equation boundary values of pluriharmonic functions must satisfy. Rizza's result motivated other works on the same topic by Gaetano Fichera, Paolo de Bartolomeis and Giuseppe Tomassini.

== Selected publications ==
=== Research works ===
- Rizza, Giovanni Battista (1950), "Sulle funzioni analitiche nelle algebre ipercomplesse" [On analytic functions on hypercomplex algebras], Pontificia Academia Scientiarum. Commentationes (in Italian), 14: 169–194, MR 0057350. In this work Rizza extends the classical Cauchy's integral theorem to monogenic functions on a general complex algebra.
- Rizza, Giovanni Battista (1952), "Contributi al problema della determinazione di una formula integrale per le funzioni monogene nelle algebre complesse dotate di modulo e commutative" [Contributions to the problem of determining an integral formula for monogenic functions on complex commutative algebras with modulus], Rendiconti di Matematica, V Serie (in Italian), 23 (1–2): 134–155, MR 0211370, Zbl 0047.32204
- Rizza, Giovanni Battista (1952a), "Estensione della formula integrale di Cauchy alle algebre complesse dotate di modulo e commutative" [Extension of Cauchy's integral formula to commutative complex algebras with modulus], Rendiconti della Accademia Nazionale dei Lincei, Classe di Scienze Fisiche, Matematiche e Naturali, Serie VIII (in Italian), XII (6): 667–669, MR 0062240, Zbl 0048.06101
- Rizza, Giovanni Battista (1953), "Teoria delle funzioni nelle algebre complesse dotate di modulo e commutative" [Function theory on commutative complex algebras with modulus], Rendiconti di Matematica, V Serie (in Italian), 23 (1–2): 221–249, MR 0211370, Zbl 0123.15203
- Rizza, Giovanni Battista (1954), "On Dirichlet's problem for components of analytic functions of several complex variables" (PDF), Proceedings of the International Congress of Mathematicians, 1954. Volume II, ICM Proceedings, Amsterdam–Groningen: Erven P. Noordhoff N.V. / North-Holland Publishing Company, pp. 161–162. A short research announcement describing briefly the results proved in (Rizza 1955).
- Rizza, G. B. (1955), "Dirichlet problem for n-harmonic functions and related geometrical problems", Mathematische Annalen, 130 (3): 202–218, doi:10.1007/BF01343349, MR 0074881, S2CID 121147845, Zbl 0067.33004, available at DigiZeitschirften.
- Rizza, G. B. (1957), "Su diverse estensioni dell'invariante di E. E. Levi nella teoria delle funzioni di più variabili complesse" [On different extensions of E. E. Levi invariant in the theory of functions of several complex variables], Annali di Matematica Pura ed Applicata (in Italian), 44 (1): 73–89, doi:10.1007/BF02415191, MR 0095965, S2CID 120897623, Zbl 0091.25903. In this work Rizza epitomizes all known extensions of the Levi invariant to hypersurfaces in $\mathbb{C}^n$ for n > 2 in a single tensor of hybrid type. This paper is also interesting since it traces the story of such extensions back to the pioneering work of Eugenio Elia Levi.
- Rizza, G. B. (1958), "Appendice I. Rappresentazione esplicita di tipo integrale per le funzioni r–armoniche. Estensione al caso di r variabili complesse dell'invariante di E. E. Levi", in Severi, Francesco (ed.), Lezioni sulle funzioni analitiche di più variabili complesse – Tenute nel 1956–57 all'Istituto Nazionale di Alta Matematica in Roma [Lectures on analytic functions of several complex variables – Lectured in 1956–57 at the Istituto Nazionale di Alta Matematica in Rome] (in Italian), Padova: CEDAM – Casa Editrice Dott. Antonio Milani, pp. 219–231, Zbl 0094.28002. The notes from the lectures given by Giovanni Battista Rizza for a course held by Francesco Severi at the Istituto Nazionale di Alta Matematica: the full course notes, published as a monograph, include also a chapter by Enzo Martinelli and an appendix by Mario Benedicty). The topics he exposes are summarized by the two parts of the title, whose free English translations are "Explicit integral representation for $r$–harmonic functions" and "Extension of the E. E. Levi invariant to the case of $r$ complex variables".
- Rizza, Giovanni Battista (1962a), "Finsler structures on almost complex manifolds", Proceedings of the International Congress of Mathematicians, Stockholm. (PDF), ICM Proceedings, vol. P, Stockholm, p. 73. A short research announcement describing briefly the results proved in (Rizza 1963).
- Rizza, Giovanni Battista (1962b), "Strutture di Finsler sulle varietà quasi complesse" [Finsler structures on almost complex manifolds], Rendiconti della Accademia Nazionale dei Lincei, Classe di Scienze Fisiche, Matematiche e Naturali, Serie VIII (in Italian), 33 (5): 271–275, Zbl 0113.37202. Another short presentation of the results proved in (Rizza 1963).
- Rizza, Giovanni Battista (1963), "Strutture di Finsler di tipo quasi Hermitiano" [Finsler structures of almost Hermitian type] (PDF), Rivista di Matematica della Università di Parma, (2) (in Italian), 4: 83–106, MR 0166742, Zbl 0129.14101. The article gives the proofs of the results previously announced in references (Rizza 1962a) and Rizza (1962b).
- Rizza, Giovanni Battista (1964), "F-forme quadratiche ed hermitiane" [Hermitian and quadratic F-forms], Rendiconti di Matematica, V Serie (in Italian), 23 (1–2): 221–249, MR 0211370, Zbl 0123.15203. Shoshichi Kobayashi cites this article as the first one in the theory of Rizza manifolds.
- Rizza, Giovanni Battista (1969), "Teoremi di rappresentazione per alcune classi di connessioni su di una varietà quasi complessa" [Representation theorems for some classes of connections on a quasi complessa] (PDF), Rendiconti dell'Istituto di Matematica dell'Università di Trieste (in Italian), 1: 9–25, MR 0257917, Zbl 0183.50701.
- Rizza, Giovanni Battista (1969), "Connessioni metriche sulle varietà quasi hermitiane" [Metric connections quasi hermitian manifolds] (PDF), Rendiconti dell'Istituto di Matematica dell'Università di Trieste (in Italian), 1: 9–25, MR 0262995, Zbl 0192.58903.
- Dentoni, Paolo; Rizza, Giovanni Battista (1972), "Una nuova classe di funzioni in un'algebra reale" [A new class of functions on a real algebra] (PDF), Rendiconti dell'Istituto di Matematica dell'Università di Trieste (in Italian), 4: 171–181, MR 0492318, Zbl 0251.30050. In this work the authors introduce a new class of functions on a real algebra in the attempt of unifying the research trends on functions on real algebras in the seventies.

=== Historical, commemorative and survey papers ===
- Rizza, Giovanni Battista (December 12, 1973), "Contributi recenti alla teoria delle funzioni nelle algebre" [Recent contributions to the theory of functions on algebras], Rendiconti del Seminario Matematico e Fisico di Milano (in Italian), 43 (1): 45–54, doi:10.1007/BF02924838, MR 0350025, S2CID 123219540, Zbl 0325.30040. A short but comprehensive survey paper detailing the works on the field done by Italian mathematicians during the years from 1961 to 1973: however, it also includes several biographical references to other earlier works by non Italian mathematicians and to historical bibliographies on hypercomplex analysis.
- Rizza, Giovanni Battista (1986), "Indirizzo di adesione", in Montalenti, G.; Amerio, L.; Acquaro, G.; Baiada, E.; Cesari, L.; Ciliberto, C.; Cimmino, G.; Cinquini, S.; De Giorgi, E.; Faedo, S.; Fichera, G.; Galligani, I.; Ghizzetti, A.; Graffi, D.; Greco, D.; Grioli, G.; Magenes, E.; Martinelli, E.; Pettineo, B.; Scorza, G.; Vesentini, E. (eds.), Convegno celebrativo del centenario della nascita di Mauro Picone e Leonida Tonelli (6–9 maggio 1985), Atti dei Convegni Lincei, vol. 77, Roma: Accademia Nazionale dei Lincei, pp. 29–30, archived from the original on February 23, 2011. The brief "participating address" presented to the International congress on the occasion of the celebration of the centenary of birth of Mauro Picone and Leonida Tonelli (held in Rome on May 6–9, 1985), by Giovanni Battista Rizza on behalf of the University of Parma: the scientific relations between Leonida Tonelli and the Department of Mathematics in Parma are described.
- Rizza, Giovanni Battista (1984), "Enzo Martinelli: Scienziato e Maestro" [Enzo Martinelli: Scientist and Master] (PDF), Rivista di Matematica della Università di Parma, (4) (in Italian), 10^{*}: 1–10, MR 0777308, Zbl 0557.01011. A celebrative paper written by Giovanni Battista Rizza to honor his former master.
- Rizza, Giovanni Battista (1998), "Commemorazione del Prof. Francesco Speranza" [Commemoration of Prof. Francesco Speranza] (PDF), Rivista di Matematica della Università di Parma, (6) (in Italian), 1: 225–230, MR 1680985.
- Rizza, Giovanni Battista (1999), "Commemorazione della professoressa Bianca Manfredi" [Commemoration of professor Bianca Manfredi] (PDF), Rivista di Matematica della Università di Parma, (6) (in Italian), 2: 213–215, MR 1753340, Zbl 1073.01521.
- Rizza, Giovanni Battista (April 2002), "Commemorazione di Enzo Martinelli" [Commemoration of Enzo Martinelli], Bollettino dell'Unione Matematica Italiana. Sezione A. La Matematica nella Società e nella Cultura, Serie VIII (in Italian), 5-A: 163–176, MR 1924344, Zbl 1194.01133.

== See also ==
- Almost complex manifold
- Complex manifold
- Kähler manifold
- Pluriharmonic function
- Pseudoconvexity
- Rizza manifold
- Several complex variables

== Sources ==
=== Biographical ===
- Balkan Society of Geometers (July 24, 2011), The list of members of the Balkan Society of Geometers (PDF).
- Bollettino UMI (1954), "Notizie" [Notices], Bollettino dell'Unione Matematica Italiana, Serie III (in Italian), 9 (4): 467–490. The official relation of the judging commission for the awarding of the Ottorino Pomini Prize in 1954, jointly won by Gabriele Darbo and Giovanni Battista Rizza.
- Bollettino UMI (1962), "Notizie" [Notices], Bollettino dell'Unione Matematica Italiana, Serie III (in Italian), 17 (1): 120–157. The official announcement of the winning by Giovanni Battista Rizza of the chair of "Geometria analitica con elementi di Geometria Proiettiva e Geometria Descrittiva con Disegno" awarded by the University of Parma.
- The Editorial Board, ed. (1965), "Professori ordinari", Annuario dell'Università di Parma [Yearbook of the University of Parma], vol. A.A. 1964/1965, Parma: Università degli Studi di Parma.
- The Editorial Board, ed. (1980), "Professori ordinari", Annuario dell'Università di Parma [Yearbook of the University of Parma], vol. A.A. 1979/80, Parma: Università degli Studi di Parma.
- The Editorial Board, ed. (1995), "Professori ordinari", Annuario dell'Università di Parma [Yearbook of the University of Parma], vol. A.A. 1994/95, Parma: Università degli Studi di Parma.
- Martinelli, E. (1994), "Omaggio a Giovanni Battista Rizza in occasione del suo 70° compleanno" (PDF), in Donnini, S.; Gigante, G.; Mangione, V. (eds.), Geometria differenziale – Analisi complessa. Convegno internazionale – Parma, 19–20 maggio 1994 in occasione del 70° compleanno di G. B. Rizza, 5^{a} Serie (in Italian), vol. 3, Rivista di Matematica della Università di Parma, pp. 1–2. "Homage to Giovanni Battista Rizza on his 70th birthday" (English translation of the title) a tribute to Giovanni Battista Rizza by his former master Enzo Martinelli.
- Il Ministro dell'Università e della Ricerca Scientifica e Tecnologica (February 19, 1999), Decreto Ministeriale 17 Febbraio 1999 [Ministerial Decree 17 February 1999] (in Italian). The "Ministerial Decree" awarding the title of "Professor Emeritus" to Giovanni Battista Rizza.
- Archivio Necrologi (October 15, 2018), Funerale di Giambattista Rizza.
- Presidenza della Repubblica Italiana (July 31, 1973), Medaglia d'oro ai benemeriti della scuola della cultura e dell'arte: Giovanni Battista Rizza.
- Rivista di Matematica della Università di Parma, (the Editorial Board of) (December 12, 2013), History, archived from the original on June 4, 2019.
- Roghi, G. (December 2005), "Materiale per una storia dell'Istituto Nazionale di Alta Matematica dal 1939 to 2003." [Materials toward a history of the Istituto Nazionale di Alta Matematica from 1939 to 2003], Bollettino della Unione Matematica Italiana, Sezione A, La Matematica nella Società e nella Cultura, Serie VIII (in Italian), 8-A (3, parte 2): x+301, MR 2225078, Zbl 1089.01500. "Materials toward a history of the Istituto Nazionale di Alta Matematica from 1939 to 2003" (English translation of title) is a monographic fascicle published on the "Bollettino della Unione Matematica Italiana", describing the history of the Istituto Nazionale di Alta Matematica Francesco Severi from its foundation in 1939 to 2003. It was written by Gino Roghi and includes a presentation by Salvatore Coen and a preface by Corrado De Concini. It is almost exclusively based on sources from the institute archives: the wealth and variety of materials included, jointly with its appendices and indexes, make this monograph a useful reference not only for the history of the institute itself, but also for the history of many mathematicians who taught, followed the institute courses or simply worked there.
- Schreiber, Bruno (1973), Curriculum Vitæ di Giambattista Rizza [Curriculum Vitæ of Giambattista Rizza] (in Italian), Istituto di Matematica dell'Università di Parma, p. 4. The official 1973 CV of Giovanni Battista Rizza, available from the Institute of Mathematics of the University of Parma.
- Tensor Society (2010), List of life members of the Tensor Society (PDF).
- Venturini, Giancarlo (1963), "Prolusione all'apertura dell'A.A. 1962/63", Annuario dell'Università di Parma [Yearbook of the University of Parma], vol. A.A. 1962/63, Parma: Università degli Studi di Parma. The opening address on the occasion of the beginning of the academic year 1962/63, given by the Magnifico Rettore prof. G. Venturini.

=== Scientific ===
- Aikou, Tadashi (2004), "Finsler Geometry on Complex Vector Bundles" (PDF), in Bao, David; Bryant, Robert L.; Chern, Shiing-Shen; Shen, Zhongmin (eds.), A Sampler of Riemann–Finsler Geometry, Mathematical Sciences Research Institute Publications, vol. 50, Cambridge: Cambridge University Press, pp. 83–105, Bibcode:2004srfg.book.....B, ISBN 978-0-521-83181-9, MR 2132658, Zbl 1073.53093.
- de Bartolomeis, Paolo; Tomassini, Giuseppe (1981), "Traces of pluriharmonic functions", Compositio Mathematica, 44 (1–3): 29–39, MR 0662454, Zbl 0484.32007.
- Donnini, S.; Gigante, G.; Mangione, V., eds. (1994), "Geometria differenziale – Analisi complessa. Convegno internazionale – Parma, 19–20 maggio 1994 in occasione del 70° compleanno di G. B. Rizza" [Differential Geometry – Complex analysis" held in Parma on May 19–20, 1994 to celebrate Giovanni Battista Rizza's 70th birthday], Rivista di Matematica della Università di Parma, Serie 5, 3 (Parte I). The proceedings of an international meeting celebrating Giovanni Battista Rizza, published by the Rivista di Matematica della Università di Parma. The first speaker was his former master Enzo Martinelli.
- Fichera, Gaetano (1982a), "Problemi al contorno per le funzioni pluriarmoniche", Atti del Convegno celebrativo dell'80° anniversario della nascita di Renato Calapso, Messina–Taormina, 1–4 aprile 1981 (in Italian), Roma: Libreria Eredi Virgilio Veschi, pp. 127–152, MR 0698973, Zbl 0958.32504. "Boundary value problems for pluriharmonic functions" (English translation of the title) deals with boundary value problems for pluriharmonic functions: Fichera gives a trace condition for the solvability of the problem and extensively reviews its history, starting from its beginning in the work of Henri Poincaré and analyzing several earlier results of Enzo Martinelli, Giovanni Battista Rizza and Francesco Severi, as well as works of Aldo Andreotti among the others.
- Fichera, Gaetano (1982b), "Valori al contorno delle funzioni pluriarmoniche: estensione allo spazio R^{2n} di un teorema di L. Amoroso" [Boundary values of pluriharmonic functions: extension to the space R^{2n} of a theorem of L. Amoroso], Rendiconti del Seminario Matematico e Fisico di Milano (in Italian), 52 (1): 23–34, doi:10.1007/BF02924996, MR 0802991, S2CID 122147246, Zbl 0569.31006. In this work Gaetano Fichera proves another trace condition for pluriharmonic functions and surveys other recent works in the fields, notably the one of de Bartolomeis & Tomassini (1981).
- Fuks, B. A. (1963), Introduction to the Theory of Analytic Functions of Several Complex Variables [Boundary values of pluriharmonic functions: extension to the space R^{2n} of a theorem of L. Amoroso], Translations of Mathematical Monographs, vol. 8, Providence, RI: American Mathematical Society, pp. vi+374, ISBN 9780821886441, MR 0168793, Zbl 0138.30902.
- Ichijyō, Yoshihiro (1988), "Finsler metrics on almost complex manifolds" (PDF), Rivista di Matematica della Università di Parma, (IV), 14*: 1–28, MR 1045035, Zbl 0885.53031, archived from the original (PDF) on June 18, 2022.
- Kobayashi, Shoshichi (1975), "Negative vector bundles and complex Finsler structures", Nagoya Mathematical Journal, 57: 153–166, doi:10.1017/S0027763000016615, MR 0377126, Zbl 0326.32016. In this paper, Shoshichi Kobayashi acknowledges Giovanni Battista Rizza as the first one to study complex manifolds with Finsler structure, now called Rizza manifolds.
- Martinelli, Enzo (1941), "Studio di alcune questioni della teoria delle funzioni biarmoniche e delle funzioni analitiche di due variabili complesse coll'ausilio del calcolo differenziale assoluto" [Study of some questions of the theory of biharmonic functions and of analytic functions of two complex variables by using the absolute differential calculus], Atti della Reale Accademia d'Italia. Memorie della Classe di Scienze Fisiche, Matematiche e Naturali (in Italian), 12 (4): 143–167, JFM 67.0299.01, MR 0017810, Zbl 0025.40503. In this work Martinelli proves an earlier result of Luigi Amoroso on the boundary values of pluriharmonic function by using tensor calculus.
- Scharnhorst, K. (2001), "Angles in Complex Vector Spaces", Acta Applicandae Mathematicae, 69 (1): 95–103, arXiv:math/9904077, doi:10.1023/A:1012692601098, MR 1868915, S2CID 17284421, Zbl 0993.51010.
- Severi, Francesco (1958), Lezioni sulle funzioni analitiche di più variabili complesse – Tenute nel 1956–57 all'Istituto Nazionale di Alta Matematica in Roma [Lectures on analytic functions of several complex variables – Lectured in 1956–57 at the Istituto Nazionale di Alta Matematica in Rome] (in Italian), Padova: CEDAM – Casa Editrice Dott. Antonio Milani, pp. XIV+255, Zbl 0094.28002. A set of lecture notes from a course held by Francesco Severi at the Istituto Nazionale di Alta Matematica, including appendices of Enzo Martinelli, Giovanni Battista Rizza and Mario Benedicty.
