= Frizza =

Frizza is an Italian surname. Notable people with the surname include:

- Debbie Frizza, Australian cricketer
- Gloria Frizza (born 1985), Italian footballer
- Riccardo Frizza (born 1971), Italian conductor

== See also ==
- Rizza (surname)
