= Rizza =

Rizza may refer to:

== People ==
- Rizza (surname), includes a list of people with the name
- Rizza, nickname of Australian rules footballer Leigh Ryswyk (born 1985)
- Rizza Islam (born 1990), member of the Nation of Islam and social media influencer

== Places ==
- Isola Rizza, a commune in the province of Verona, Italy
- Rizza, frazione of Villafranca di Verona in the province of Verona, Italy

== Other uses ==
- Rizza manifold in differential geometry

== See also ==
- Riza, a metal covering protecting an icon
- RZA, an American rapper and record producer (pronounced "rizza")
