= Hypercomplex analysis =

Branch of mathematical analysis

In mathematics, hypercomplex analysis is the extension of complex analysis to the hypercomplex numbers. The first instance is functions of a quaternion variable, where the argument is a quaternion (in this case, the sub-field of hypercomplex analysis is called quaternionic analysis). A second instance involves functions of a motor variable where arguments are split-complex numbers.

In mathematical physics, there are hypercomplex systems called Clifford algebras. The study of functions with arguments from a Clifford algebra is called Clifford analysis.

A matrix may be considered a hypercomplex number. For example, the study of functions of 2 × 2 real matrices shows that the topology of the space of hypercomplex numbers determines the function theory. Functions such as square root of a matrix, matrix exponential, and logarithm of a matrix are basic examples of hypercomplex analysis. The function theory of diagonalizable matrices is particularly transparent since they have eigendecompositions. Suppose $\textstyle T = \sum _{i=1}^N \lambda_i E_i$ where the E_{i} are projections. Then for any polynomial $f$, $f(T) = \sum_{i=1}^N f(\lambda_i ) E_i.$

The modern terminology for a "system of hypercomplex numbers" is an algebra over the real numbers, and the algebras used in applications are often Banach algebras since Cauchy sequences can be taken to be convergent. Then the function theory is enriched by sequences and series. In this context the extension of holomorphic functions of a complex variable is developed as the holomorphic functional calculus. Hypercomplex analysis on Banach algebras is called functional analysis.

== See also ==
- Giovanni Battista Rizza
- Biquaternion functions
