= Istituto Nazionale di Alta Matematica Francesco Severi =

Italian non-profit research institution

Istituto Nazionale di Alta Matematica "Francesco Severi"
- INdAM
- Established: 1939
- President: Giorgio Patrizio (since 2015)
- Key people: Francesco Severi
- Formerly called: Istituto Nazionale di Alta Matematica
- Address: Piazzale Aldo Moro 5, Roma
- Location: Rome, Italy
- Website: http://www.altamatematica.it/

The Istituto Nazionale di Alta Matematica Francesco Severi, abbreviated as INdAM, is a government created non-profit research institution whose main purpose is to promote research in the field of mathematics and its applications and the diffusion of higher mathematical education in Italy.

Its founder and first president, later nominated life president, was Francesco Severi, who exerted also a major influence on the creation of the institute.

== History ==
The institute was established on 13 July 1939 as the Royal National Institute of High Mathematics, with a law signed by Vittorio Emanuele III, Benito Mussolini, Paolo Thaon di Revel and Giuseppe Bottai. Its foundation is largely due to the action of Francesco Severi, possibly starting from an idea by Luigi Fantappié. The first Scientific Council was made up of Francesco Severi (president), Luigi Fantappiè, Giulio Krall, Enrico Bompiani and Mauro Picone. In 1946, following the Italian referendum, the adjective "Royal" was removed from its name. In 1976 it assumed the current official name of National Institute of High Mathematics "Francesco Severi".

From the beginning, the main activity of INdAM has been the organisation of advanced courses aimed at gifted young people. In this way, the Institute has contributed significantly to the education of many Italian mathematicians, also due to the opportunities offered to them to come into contact with some of the leading international mathematicians.

The Italian mathematicians who worked as professors and/or were students at INdAM included Antonio Signorini, Gianfranco Cimmino, Iacopo Barsotti, Luigi Amerio, Beniamino Segre, Enzo Martinelli, Renato Caccioppoli, Fabio Conforto, Giovanni Battista Rizza, Aldo Andreotti, Edoardo Vesentini, Gaetano Fichera, Ennio De Giorgi, Claudio Procesi, Maurizio Cornalba, Alessandro Figà-Talamanca, Enrico Giusti, Antonio Ambrosetti, Paolo Marcellini, Enrico Bombieri, Corrado De Concini, Nicola Fusco and Mario Pulvirenti.

The foreign mathematicians included Leonard Roth, Helmut Hasse, Wilhelm Blaschke, Paul Dubreil, Lucien Godeaux, Luitzen Brouwer, Jean Leray, Wacław Sierpiński, Wolfgang Gröbner, Heinz Hopf, Erich Kähler, Oskar Zariski, Georges De Rham, Max Deuring, Bartel Leendert Van der Waerden, Kazimierz Kuratowski, John Lighton Synge, Louis Mordell, Rolf Nevanlinna, Richard von Mises, Ernst Witt, Henri Cartan, Jacques Tits, Jean Dieudonné, Victor Kac, Francis Clarke.

== INdAM Research Groups ==
The National Research Groups were originally part of the National Research Council (CNR); among the directors of the Research Groups in that period there are Vinicio Boffi, Roberto Conti and Ilio Galligani. Since 1999 the National Research Groups have been an integral part of the INdAM.

These are four National Research Groups with a staff of more than 2,500 researchers. The Groups carry out research in mathematics by financing research projects, inviting qualified foreign researchers to Italy, and financing stays abroad of young Italian researchers to carry out collaborative research at universities and other institutions. In particular, the Groups promote, coordinate and support the research activities of its members through: a) the Visiting Professors program; b) the financial contributions to the organisation of conferences; c) the reimbursement of travel expenses in Italy and abroad; d) the funding of Research and Training Projects.

The four National Research Groups of the INdAM are the following:

=== National Group for Mathematical Analysis, Probability and their Applications (GNAMPA) ===
The GNAMPA group supports and coordinates research in Differential Equations and Dynamical Systems; Variational Calculus and Optimisation; Real Analysis, Measure theory and Probability; and Functional and Harmonic Analysis.

=== National Group for Numerical Analysis (GNCS) ===
The GNCS group supports and coordinates research in Numerical Analysis and basic research in Computer Science.

=== National Group for Mathematical Physics (GNFM) ===
The GNFM group supports and coordinates research in Mechanics of discrete systems; Fluid Mechanics; Continuum Mechanics; Diffusion and transport problems; and Relativity and Field theory.

=== National Group for Algebraic and Geometric Structures and their Applications (GNSAGA) ===
The GNSAGA group supports and coordinates research in Differential Geometry; Complex geometry and Topology; Algebraic Geometry and Commutative Algebra; and Mathematical Logic and applications.
