= Pulvirenti =

Pulvirenti is an Italian surname. Notable people with the surname include:

- Antonino Pulvirenti (born 1952), Italian businessman, founder of Wind Jet
- Mario Pulvirenti (born 1946), Italian mathematician
- Santi Pulvirenti (born 1973), Italian composer
