= Pluriharmonic function =

In mathematics, precisely in the theory of functions of several complex variables, a pluriharmonic function is a real valued function which is locally the real part of a holomorphic function of several complex variables. Sometimes such a function is referred to as n-harmonic function, where n ≥ 2 is the dimension of the complex domain where the function is defined. However, in modern expositions of the theory of functions of several complex variables it is preferred to give an equivalent formulation of the concept, by defining pluriharmonic function a complex valued function whose restriction to every complex line is a harmonic function with respect to the real and imaginary part of the complex line parameter.

== Formal definition ==
Definition 1. Let G ⊆ C^{n} be a complex domain and f : G → R be a C^{2} (twice continuously differentiable) function. The function f is called pluriharmonic if, for every complex line

$$\{ a + b z \mid z \in \Complex \} \subset \Complex^n$$

formed by using every couple of complex tuples a, b ∈ C^{n}, the function

$$z \mapsto f(a + bz)$$

is a harmonic function on the set

$$\{ z \in \Complex \mid a + b z \in G \} \subset \Complex .$$

Definition 2. Let M be a complex manifold and f : M → R be a C^{2} function. The function f is called pluriharmonic if

$$dd^c f = 0.$$

== Basic properties ==
Every pluriharmonic function is a harmonic function, but not the other way around. Further, it can be shown that for holomorphic functions of several complex variables the real (and the imaginary) parts are locally pluriharmonic functions. However a function being harmonic in each variable separately does not imply that it is pluriharmonic.

== See also ==
- Plurisubharmonic function
- Wirtinger derivatives

== Historical references ==
- Gunning, Robert C.; Rossi, Hugo (1965), Analytic Functions of Several Complex Variables, Prentice-Hall series in Modern Analysis, Englewood Cliffs, N.J.: Prentice-Hall, pp. xiv+317, ISBN 9780821869536, MR 0180696, Zbl 0141.08601.
- Krantz, Steven G. (1992), Function Theory of Several Complex Variables, Wadsworth & Brooks/Cole Mathematics Series (Second ed.), Pacific Grove, California: Wadsworth & Brooks/Cole, pp. xvi+557, ISBN 0-534-17088-9, MR 1162310, Zbl 0776.32001.
- Poincaré, H. (1899), "Sur les propriétés du potentiel et sur les fonctions Abéliennes", Acta Mathematica (in French), 22 (1): 89–178, doi:10.1007/BF02417872, JFM 29.0370.02.
- Severi, Francesco (1958), Lezioni sulle funzioni analitiche di più variabili complesse – Tenute nel 1956–57 all'Istituto Nazionale di Alta Matematica in Roma (in Italian), Padova: CEDAM – Casa Editrice Dott. Antonio Milani, pp. XIV+255, Zbl 0094.28002. Notes from a course held by Francesco Severi at the Istituto Nazionale di Alta Matematica (which at present bears his name), containing appendices of Enzo Martinelli, Giovanni Battista Rizza and Mario Benedicty. An English translation of the title reads as:-"Lectures on analytic functions of several complex variables – Lectured in 1956–57 at the Istituto Nazionale di Alta Matematica in Rome".
