= Italian school of algebraic geometry =

Group of Italian mathematicians who studied birational geometry (c. 1885–1935)

In relation to the history of mathematics, the Italian school of algebraic geometry refers to mathematicians and their work in birational geometry, particularly on algebraic surfaces, centered around Rome roughly from 1885 to 1935. There were 30 to 40 leading mathematicians who made major contributions, about half of those being Italian. The leadership fell to the group in Rome of Guido Castelnuovo, Federigo Enriques and Francesco Severi, who were involved in some of the deepest discoveries, as well as setting the style.

== Algebraic surfaces ==
The emphasis on algebraic surfaces—algebraic varieties of dimension two—followed on from an essentially complete geometric theory of algebraic curves (dimension 1). The position in around 1870 was that the curve theory had incorporated with Brill–Noether theory the Riemann–Roch theorem in all its refinements (via the detailed geometry of the theta-divisor).

The classification of algebraic surfaces was a bold and successful attempt to repeat the division of algebraic curves by their genus g. The division of curves corresponds to the rough classification into the three types: g = 0 (projective line); g = 1 (elliptic curve); and g > 1 (Riemann surfaces with independent holomorphic differentials). In the case of surfaces, the Enriques classification was into five similar big classes, with three of those being analogues of the curve cases, and two more (elliptic fibrations, and K3 surfaces, as they would now be called) being with the case of two-dimension abelian varieties in the 'middle' territory. This was an essentially sound, breakthrough set of insights, recovered in modern complex manifold language by Kunihiko Kodaira in the 1950s, and refined to include mod p phenomena by Zariski, the Shafarevich school and others by around 1960. The form of the Riemann–Roch theorem on a surface was also worked out.

== Foundational issues ==
Some proofs produced by the school are not considered satisfactory because of foundational difficulties. These included frequent use of birational models in dimension three of surfaces that can have non-singular models only when embedded in higher-dimensional projective space. In order to avoid these issues, a sophisticated theory of handling a linear system of divisors was developed (in effect, a line bundle theory for hyperplane sections of putative embeddings in projective space). Many modern techniques were found, in embryonic form, and in some cases the articulation of these ideas exceeded the available technical language.

== The geometers ==
According to Guerraggio & Nastasi (page 9, 2005), Luigi Cremona is "considered the founder of the Italian school of algebraic geometry". Later they explain that in Turin the collaboration of Enrico D'Ovidio and Corrado Segre "would bring, either by their own efforts or those of their students, Italian algebraic geometry to full maturity". A one-time student of Segre, H.F. Baker wrote that Corrado Segre "may probably be said to be the father of that wonderful Italian school which has achieved so much in the birational theory of algebraical loci." On this topic, Brigaglia & Ciliberto (2004) say "Segre had headed and maintained the school of geometry that Luigi Cremona had established in 1860." Reference to the Mathematics Genealogy Project shows that, in terms of Italian doctorates, the real productivity of the school began with Guido Castelnuovo and Federigo Enriques.

The roll of honour of the school includes the following other Italians: Giacomo Albanese, Eugenio Bertini, Luigi Campedelli, Oscar Chisini, Michele De Franchis, Pasquale del Pezzo, Beniamino Segre, Francesco Severi, Guido Zappa (with contributions also from Gino Fano, Carlo Rosati, Giuseppe Torelli, Giuseppe Veronese).

Elsewhere it involved H. F. Baker and Patrick du Val (UK), Arthur Byron Coble (USA), Georges Humbert and Charles Émile Picard (France), Lucien Godeaux (Belgium), Hermann Schubert and Max Noether, and later Oscar Zariski (United States), Erich Kähler (Germany), H. G. Zeuthen (Denmark).

These figures were all involved in algebraic geometry, rather than the pursuit of projective geometry as synthetic geometry, which during the period under discussion was a huge (in volume terms) but secondary subject (when judged by its importance as research).

== Advent of topology ==
In 1950 Henry Forder mentioned the Italian school in connection with algebraic curves.

Further development of the theory of plane curves is only fruitful when it is connected with the theory of Riemann surfaces and Abelian functions. This has been a favorite study during the last fifty years, of the Italian geometers, and they have also made contributions of great beauty to a similar theory of surfaces and of “Varieties” of higher dimensions. Herein a combination of the theory of integrals on the varieties, and of their topology, yields decisive results. The theory of curves and surfaces is thus connected with modern algebra and topology...

The new algebraic geometry that would succeed the Italian school was distinguished by the intensive use of algebraic topology. The founder of that tendency was Henri Poincaré; during the 1930s it was developed by Lefschetz, Hodge and Todd. The modern synthesis brought together their work, that of the Cartan school, and of W.L. Chow and Kunihiko Kodaira, with the traditional material.

== Declining influence ==
In the earlier years of the Italian school under Castelnuovo, the standards of rigor were as high as most areas of mathematics. Under Enriques it gradually became acceptable to use somewhat more informal arguments instead of complete rigorous proofs, such as the "principle of continuity" saying that what is true up to the limit is true at the limit, a claim that had neither a rigorous proof nor even a precise statement. Despite this, many of Enriques' claims turned out to be correct, and he was able to produce spectacular results about algebraic surfaces. Unfortunately, from about 1930 onwards under Severi's leadership the standards of accuracy declined further, to the point where some of the claimed results were not just inadequately proved, but were incorrect. For example, in 1934 Severi claimed that the space of rational equivalence classes of cycles on an algebraic surface is finite-dimensional, but Mumford (1968) showed that this is false for surfaces of positive geometric genus, and in 1946 Severi published a paper claiming to prove that a degree-6 surface in 3-dimensional projective space has at most 52 nodes, but the Barth sextic has 65 nodes. Severi did not accept that his arguments were inadequate, leading to some acrimonious disputes as to the status of some results.

By the 1940s the international mathematical community had begun to doubt the foundations of the Italian school's reasoning, and ideas such as intersection multiplicity, which had been around for several decades, began to be disputed. Algebraic geometry began to evolve in a new direction, following the ideas of Weil and Zariski, who developed new foundations based on the commutative algebra of Krull and Noether. In particular in the 1960s Kodaira and Shafarevich and his students rewrote the Enriques classification of algebraic surfaces, and also extended it to all compact complex surfaces, while in the 1970s Fulton and MacPherson put the classical calculations of intersection theory on rigorous foundations.
