= Domenico Marotta =

Italian chemist and scientist

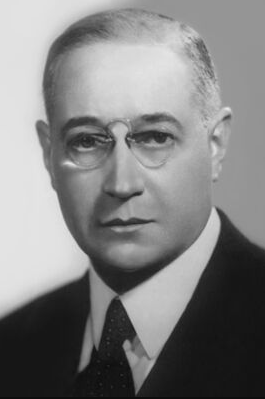
- Born: July 28, 1886; Palermo, Kingdom of Italy
- Died: 30 March 1974 (aged 87); Rome, Italy
- Education: University of Palermo
- Scientific career
- Fields: Chemistry
- Workplaces: University of Florence, Istituto Superiore di Sanità
- Doctoral advisor: Giorgio Errera

President of the Accademia nazionale delle scienze
- In office 15 February 1962 – 16 January 1974
- Preceded by: Francesco Severi
- Succeeded by: Beniamino Segre

Domenico Marotta (July 28, 1886, Palermo, Italy – March 30, 1974, Rome, Italy) was an Italian chemist and scientist, serving as the director of the Italian National Institute of Health (ISS) from 1935 to 1961.

== Biography ==
After obtaining a degree in Chemistry and Pharmacy in 1910 at the University of Palermo under Professor Giorgio Errera, with a thesis titled Azione dell'acido nitrico sullo ftalacene (Action of nitric acid on phthalacene), Domenico Marotta was employed at the chemistry laboratory in Palermo. He gained recognition in the same year during a cholera epidemic, earning a decoration. In 1911, he moved to Rome, where he caught the attention of chemist Emanuele Paternò, who hired him at the chemical laboratory of the Institute of Public Health located in Piazza Vittorio, of which Paternò was the director. After winning a competition for the chair of Analytical Chemistry at the University of Florence, on July 25, 1935, Marotta was appointed director of the ISS and held that position until July 29, 1961.

Marotta is considered the founder of the Higher Institute of Health (ISS). During his twenty-six years of leadership, he succeeded in optimizing the quality and quantity of the ISS's work results. Numerous technical services were established (animal facilities, administrative offices, warehouses, workshops, the library, etc.). Additionally, the ISS, besides hosting congresses and scientific conferences, was entrusted with the professional training of researchers, including those from outside the institute. The laboratories were equipped with specific tools, and a scientific museum of significant historical and artistic value was set up.

In 1938, Marotta founded the prestigious scientific journal Annali dell'Istituto Superiore di Sanità, renamed in 1965 as Annali dell'Istituto Superiore di Sanità. In 1937, he translated and published New Atlantis by Francis Bacon, a utopian tale where the well-being of the community was linked to the progress of scientific knowledge.

At the end of World War II, scientific research in Italy was rapidly recovering. Marotta successfully managed the Higher Institute of Health, restoring its prestige and modernizing its equipment. In 1946, the first and only Italian electron microscope was built, replacing the one from Siemens seized by the Germans after September 8, 1943. In 1947, the Missiroli Plan was launched, leading to the definitive defeat of malaria. Marotta also succeeded in attracting significant figures to Italy, including Nobel laureates Ernst Boris Chain and Daniel Bovet, the latter winning the Nobel Prize later for research conducted in Italy.

He established the International Center for Microbiology and Chemistry, directed by Ernst Boris Chain, overseeing the pilot plant for the experimental production of penicillin and other fermentation products, which became operational in 1951. Simultaneously, a penicillin factory was built—a unique initiative that provided Italy with a degree of autonomy in the pharmaceutical sector dominated by England and the United States.

After retiring and going through a well-known legal dispute, from 1962 to 1974, Marotta served as the president of the National Academy of Sciences, known as Accademia dei XL.

He joined Freemasonry on October 9, 1910, and on July 16, 1912, he became a Master Mason. During his time in Rome, he was affiliated with the Loggia Universo.

== Awards ==
- Knight of the Grand Cross of the Order of Merit of the Italian Republic, Rome, June 2, 1958
- Grand officer of the Order of Merit of the Italian Republic, December 30, 1952

== See also ==
- Istituto Superiore di Sanità

== Bibliography ==
- Daniel Bovet, Domenico Marotta, Ann. Ist. Super. Sanità 29 (Suppl. 1): pp. 7–21, 1993. Text of the commemoration delivered by Lyncean Bovet on April 12, 1975 Archived September 27, 2007.
- Giorgio Bignami, Origins and Subsequent Development of the Istituto Superiore di Sanità in Rome (Italy) January 14, 2011
- D. Cozzoli, M. Capocci, Making biomedicine in twentieth-century Italy: Domenico Marotta (1886-1974) and the Italian higher institute of health, in «The British journal for the history of science», 2011, 4, pp. 549–74.
- Giovanni Paoloni, Il caso Marotta: la scienza in tribunale, Le Scienze 431, luglio 2004
- Giovanni Paoloni, "MAROTTA, Domenico", Il Contributo italiano alla storia del Pensiero: Scienze, Istituto dell'Enciclopedia italiana Treccani, 2013.
- L. Paoloni, "MAROTTA, Domenico", Dizionario Biografico degli Italiani, Vol. LXX, Istituto dell'Enciclopedia italiana Treccani, 2008.
- Marco Pivato, Il miracolo scippato. Quattro occasioni sprecate della scienza italiana negli anni sessanta, Donzelli editore, 2011 ISBN 978-88-6036-542-2
