= Enzo Martinelli =

Italian mathematician (1911–1999)

- Enzo Martinelli around 1960
- Born: 11 November 1911; Pescia
- Died: 27 August 1999 (aged 87); Rome
- Education: Università degli studi di Roma "La Sapienza"
- Known for: Theory of functions of several complex variables; Bochner–Martinelli formula
- Awards: Prize of the Cotronei Foundation; Prize of the Beltrami Foundation; Fubini prize; Torelli prize; 1943 Prize for Mathematical Sciences of the Ministry of National Education
- Scientific career
- Workplaces: Università degli Studi di Genova; Università di Roma
- Doctoral advisor: Francesco Severi
- Other academic advisors: Enrico Bompiani
- Doctoral students: Giovanni Battista Rizza

Enzo Martinelli (11 November 1911 – 27 August 1999) was an Italian mathematician, working in the theory of functions of several complex variables: he is best known for his work on the theory of integral representations for holomorphic functions of several variables, notably for discovering the Bochner–Martinelli formula in 1938, and for his work in the theory of multi-dimensional residues.

== Biography ==
=== Life ===
He was born in Pescia on 11 November 1911, where his father was the Director of the local agricultural school. His family later went to Rome, where his father ended his working career as the Director-general of the Italian Ministry of Public Education. Enzo Martilnelli lived in Rome almost all of his life: the only exception was a period of nearly eight years, from 1947 to 1954, when he was in Genova, working at the local university. In 1946 he married in Rome Luigia Panella, also her a mathematician, who later become an associate professor at the faculty of Engineering of the Sapienza University of Rome, and who was his loving companion for the rest of his life. They had a son, Roberto, and a daughter, Maria Renata, who later followed her parents footsteps becoming also her a mathematician: four grandchildren completed their family.

=== Academic career ===
According to Rizza (2002, p. 165), Enzo's talent for mathematics was already evident when he was only a lyceum student. In 1933 he earned his laurea from the Sapienza University of Rome: the title of his thesis was "Sulle funzioni poligene di una e di due variabili complesse", and his thesis supervisor was Francesco Severi. From 1934 to 1946 he worked as an assistant professor first to the chair of mathematical analysis held by Francesco Severi and then to the chair of geometry held by Enrico Bompiani. In 1939 he became "Libero Docente" (free professor) of Mathematical analysis: he taught also courses on analytic geometry, algebraic geometry and topology as associate professor. In 1946 he won a competitive examination by a judging commission for the chair of "Geometria analitica con elementi di Geometria Proiettiva e Geometria Descrittiva con Disegno", awarded by the University of Genova: the second place and the third place went respectively to Giovanni Dantoni and Guido Zappa. Martinelli held that chair from 1946 to 1954, teaching also mathematical analysis, function theory, differential geometry and algebraic analysis as associate professor. In 1954 he went back in Rome to the chair of Geometry at the university, holding that chair up to his retirement, in 1982: he also taught courses on topology, higher mathematics, higher geometry upon charge. In the years 1968–1969, during a very difficult period for the Sapienza University of Rome, he served the university as the director of the Guido Castelnuovo Institute of Mathematics.

He attended various conferences and meetings. In 1943 and in 1946 he was invited in Zurich by Rudolf Fueter, in order to present his researches: later and during all his career he lectured in almost all Italian and foreign universities.

He was also a member of the UMI Scientific Commission (from 1967 to 1972), of the editorial boards of the Rendiconti di Matematica e delle sue Applicazioni (from 1955 to 1992) and of the Annali di Matematica Pura ed Applicata (from 1965 to 1999).

=== Personality traits ===
Unanimously remembered as a real gentleman, gifted by a caring attention, politeness, generosity and the rare ability to listen to colleagues and students alike, Gallarati (2000, p. 45) and Rizza (1984, p. 6) remember long conversations with him on various mathematical research topics, and his disposability to give help and advice to whoever asked for it. In particular Rizza (1984, p. 7) recalls the time when he was his doctoral student at the University of Genova: they meet every Sunday in the afternoon at Martinelli's home, since Martinelli was not able to meet him during the week. During one of their meetings, lasting a little more than two hours, Martinelli taught him Élie Cartan's theory of exterior differential forms, and Rizza used successfully this tool in his first research works. Another episode illustrating this aspect of Martinelli's personality is recalled by Gaetano Fichera. When he was back in Rome in 1945, at the end of World War II, he exposed to Martinelli a theory identical to the theory of differential form: he developed it while being prisoner of the nazists in Teramo during wartime. Martinelli, very tactfully, told him that the idea was already being developed by Élie Cartan and Georges de Rham.

An excellent teacher himself, capable to arose curiosity and enthusiasm by his lessons, he admired and much respected his own ones: nevertheless, this was quite common for the Italian scientists of the same and the preceding generations, who were advised by some of the best Italian scientists ever in the early days of their scientific career. His doctoral advisor was Francesco Severi: other great Italian mathematicians where among his teachers. Guido Castelnuovo, Federigo Enriques, Enrico Bompiani, Tullio Levi-Civita Mauro Picone and Antonio Signorini were all working at the Sapienza University of Rome when Enzo Martinelli was a student there, following their lessons: Zappa (1984) describes the activity of the institute of mathematics during that period as extremely stimulating.

Another central aspect of his personality was a deep sense of justice and legality: Martinelli was very careful in performing his citizen and university professor duties, and he was also ready to fight for his own rights and for the needs of higher education. Concerned by the growing interference of bureaucracy in university education, already in the 1950s he was heard by Rizza (1984, p. 6) complaining that: "In Italia mancano le menti semplificatrici". Martinelli was also free from every kind of authoritarianism to the point that when, during the protests of 1968 in Italy, many newspapers accused the Italian university scientific community of being so, all the assistant professors and students of Martinelli (and perhaps Martinelli himself) were perplexed. In the same period, while performing his duties as the director of the Guido Castelnuovo Institute of Mathematics at the Sapienza university of Rome, his rare intellectual honesty and rigorous rationality, according to Rizza, caused him troubles when dealing with many who "believed in everything except the cold light of reason".

=== Honors ===
While still attending at the university he won the Cotronei Foundation prize, and after earning his laurea, he was awarded the Beltrami Foundation prize, the Fubini and Torelli prizes, and the Prize for Mathematical Sciences of the Ministry of National Education: this last one was awarded him in 1943, and the judging commission consisted of Francesco Severi (as the president of the commission), Ugo Amaldi and Antonio Signorini (as the supervisor of the commission). In 1948 he was elected Corresponding Member of the Accademia Ligure di Scienze e Lettere: in 1961 and in 1977 he was elected respectively Corresponding and Full Member of the Accademia dei Lincei, and from 1982 to 1985 he was "Professore Linceo". Finally, in 1980 he was elected Corresponding Member of the Accademia delle Scienze di Torino and then, in 1994, Full Member. Also, in 1986, the Sapienza University of Rome, to which Enzo Martinelli was particularly tied for all his life, awarded him the title of professor emeritus.

== Work ==
=== Research activity ===
Fin troppo meticoloso, scriveva più volte ogni suo lavoro, curandone fin nei minimi particolari sostanza e forma, fino a renderli di piacevole lettura. È difficile trovare nei suoi scritti un concetto che possa essere espresso in modo migliore.

— Dionisio Gallarati, (Gallarati 2000, p. 45).

He is the author of more than 50 research works, the first of which was published when Martinelli still was an undergraduate student: precisely, his research production consist of 47 papers and 30 between treatises, textbooks and various other publications. According to Rizza (1984, p. 2), his research personality can be described by two words: "enthusiasm" and "dissatisfaction": enthusiasm is meant as his steady interest in mathematics at all levels, while dissatisfaction is meant as the desire to going deeper into all mathematical problems investigated, without stopping at first success and expressing all the results in a simple, elegant and essential form.

=== Teaching activity ===
Martinelli was also active in teaching. He wrote at least fifteen textbooks on geometry, topology, and complex analysis His textbooks covered both introductory and more advanced mathematical topics. Martinelli's teaching also used difficult problems to encourage students to continue with mathematical research.

== Selected publications ==
- Martinelli, Enzo (1936), "Sui coni proiettanti da un punto di una superficie di Jordan i rimanenti punti di essa" [On the cones projecting, from a point of a Jordan Surface, the remaining points of the surface], Bollettino dell'Unione Matematica Italiana, I Serie (in Italian), 15 (2): 66–71, JFM 62.1416.01, Zbl 0013.27801.
- Martinelli, Enzo (1938), "Alcuni teoremi integrali per le funzioni analitiche di più variabili complesse" [Some integral theorems for analytic functions of several complex variables], Atti della Reale Accademia d'Italia. Memorie della Classe di Scienze Fisiche, Matematiche e Naturali (in Italian), 9 (7): 269–283, JFM 64.0322.04, Zbl 0022.24002. The first paper where the now called Bochner-Martinelli formula is introduced and proved.
- Martinelli, Enzo (1941), "Studio di alcune questioni della teoria delle funzioni biarmoniche e delle funzioni analitiche di due variabili complesse coll'ausilio del calcolo differenziale assoluto" [Study of some questions of the theory of biharmonic functions and of analytic functions of two complex variables by using the absolute differential calculus], Atti della Reale Accademia d'Italia. Memorie della Classe di Scienze Fisiche, Matematiche e Naturali (in Italian), 12 (4): 143–167, JFM 67.0299.01, MR 0017810, Zbl 0025.40503. In this paper, Martinelli proves an earlier result of Luigi Amoroso on the boundary values of pluriharmonic function by using tensor calculus.
- Martinelli, Enzo (1942–1943), "Sopra una dimostrazione di R. Fueter per un teorema di Hartogs" [On a proof of R. Fueter of a theorem of Hartogs], Commentarii Mathematici Helvetici (in Italian), 15 (1): 340–349, doi:10.1007/bf02565649, MR 0010729, S2CID 119960691, Zbl 0028.15201, archived from the original on 2 October 2011. Available at the SEALS Portal. In this paper Martinelli gives a proof of Hartogs' extension theorem by using the Bochner-Martinelli formula.
- Martinelli, Enzo (1944–1945), "Sulla formula di Cauchy n–dimensionale e sopra un teorema di Hartogs nella teoria delle funzioni di n variabili complesse" [On the n–dimensional Cauchy formula and on a theorem of Hartogs in the theory of functions of n complex variables], Commentarii Mathematici Helvetici (in Italian), 17 (1): 201–208, doi:10.1007/bf02566241, MR 0013422, S2CID 119538483, Zbl 0060.24404, archived from the original on 9 March 2012. Available at the SEALS Portal.
- Martinelli, Enzo (1945–1946), "Formula di Cauchy (n+1)–dimensionale per le funzioni analitiche di n variabili complesse" [(n+1)–dimensional Cauchy formula for analytic functions of n complex variables], Commentarii Mathematici Helvetici (in Italian), 18 (1): 30–41, doi:10.1007/bf02568098, MR 0013423, S2CID 122866364, Zbl 0060.24501, archived from the original on 9 March 2012. Available at the SEALS Portal. In this work, Martinelli goes further in its analysis of integral representations of holomorphic functions of n complex variables whose domain of integration is a set whose dimension (as a subset of the 2n–dimensional euclidean space) assumes all integer values between n and 2n-1.
- Martinelli, Enzo (1953), "Sulle estensioni della formula integrale di Cauchy alle funzioni analitiche di più variabili complesse" [On the extensions of Cauchy's integral formula to analytic functions of several complex variables], Annali di Matematica Pura ed Applicata, IV Serie (in Italian), 34: 277–347, doi:10.1007/BF02415334, MR 0057989, S2CID 122304771, Zbl 0104.30203. The concluding work of Martinelli on the theory of integral representations of holomorphic functions of n complex variables.
- Martinelli, Enzo (1961), "Sulla determinazione di una funzione analitica di più variabili complesse in un campo, assegnatane la traccia sulla frontiera" [On the computation of an analytic function of several complex variables in a region, given its trace on the boundary], Annali di Matematica Pura ed Applicata, IV Serie (in Italian), 55: 191–202, doi:10.1007/BF02412084, MR 0170032, S2CID 120823353, Zbl 0104.30203. This paper contains Martinelli's improvement of the solution of the Dirichlet problem for holomorphic functions of several complex variables given by Fichera (1957) few years before: Martinelli relaxes the smoothness condition on the boundary of the given domain, requiring it to be only of class C^{1}. However, the boundary value is required to be of the same class, smoother than class H^{1/2} data allowed by Gaetano Fichera.
- Martinelli, Enzo (1975), "Sopra una formula di Andreotti–Norguet" [On a formula of Andreotti–Norguet], Bollettino dell'Unione Matematica Italiana, IV Serie (in Italian), 11 (3, Supplemento): 455–457, MR 0390270, Zbl 0317.32006.
- Martinelli, Enzo (1984), Introduzione elementare alla teoria delle funzioni di variabili complesse con particolare riguardo alle rappresentazioni integrali [Elementary introduction to the theory of functions of complex variables with particular regard to integral representations], Contributi del Centro Linceo Interdisciplinare di Scienze Matematiche e Loro Applicazioni (in Italian), vol. 67, Rome: Accademia Nazionale dei Lincei, pp. 236+II, archived from the original on 27 September 2011. The notes form a course, published by the Accademia Nazionale dei Lincei, held by Martinelli during his stay at the Accademia as "Professore Linceo".
- Martinelli, Enzo (1984b), "Qualche riflessione sulla rappresentazione integrale di massima dimensione per le funzioni di più variabili complesse" [Some reflections on the integral representation of maximal dimension for functions of several complex variables], Atti della Accademia Nazionale dei Lincei. Rendiconti. Classe di Scienze Fisiche, Matematiche e Naturali, Series VIII (in Italian), 76 (4): 235–242, MR 0863486, Zbl 0599.32002. In this article, Martinelli gives another form, specifically more potential theoretic, of the Martinelli–Bochner formula.

== See also ==
- Almost complex manifold
- Bochner–Martinelli formula
- Complex manifold
- Kähler manifold
- Pluriharmonic function
- Residue theorem
- Several complex variables
