= Rivista di Matematica della Università di Parma =

- Discipline: Mathematics
- Language: English
- Edited by: Alessandro Zaccagnini

Publication details
- History: 1950–present
- Publisher: Department of Mathematics and Computer Science of the University of Parma (Italy)
- Frequency: Biannual

Standard abbreviations
- ISO 4: Riv. Mat. Univ. Parma
- MathSciNet: Riv. Math. Univ. Parma

Indexing
- ISSN: 0035-6298 (print); 2284-2578 (web)
- OCLC no.: 1716082

Links
- Journal homepage; Online access

The Rivista di Matematica della Università di Parma (The Mathematical Revue of the University of Parma) is a peer-reviewed mathematics journal published by the Department of Mathematics and Computer Science of the University of Parma, established in 1950. It is devoted to publication of original research and survey papers in all areas of pure and applied mathematics: it also publishes workshops and conferences proceedings, following the tradition behind its foundation.

The journal is abstracted and indexed by Scopus, Mathematical Reviews and Zentralblatt MATH.

== Historical notice ==
=== Foundation ===
The journal was founded by Antonio Mambriani in 1950, with the aim to publish the proceedings of the mathematical congress "Analisi funzionale e equazioni differenziali", held in Parma on June 4, 1949. Among the participants there were Renato Caccioppoli, Gianfranco Cimmino, Luigi Fantappiè, Carlo Miranda, Giovanni Sansone, Francesco Severi and Giuseppe Zwirner: all their contributions, except the one of Caccioppoli, were published in the first volume of the Journal, released in the month of December 1950. Caccioppoli's conference, despite a help request sent by Mambriani to Carlo Miranda and the submitting of a shorthand draft to Caccioppoli through Miranda with praise to review and correct it for the publication, remained unpublished until 1999. Along with Mambriani, another person who was in the editorial board of the journal since 1950 was Bianca Manfredi. She cured the scientific aspect of the published papers and their formal appearance up to the least details and, after working at the journal for 25 years along with Mambriani, she served as its director for 17 years, from 1975 to 1991, showing considerable management skills.

=== Timeline of journal series and editors in chief ===
At present, eight series of the "Rivista" have been published, each one corresponding approximately to the duration of the period of charge of a given editor in chief. The full list of published series and editors in chief is tabulated below:

Years	Journal series	Editor in chief	References
1950–1959	Serie 1	Antonio Mambriani	(The Editorial Board 1974, p. I).
1960–1971	Serie 2	Carmelo Longo	(The Editorial Board 2013b).
1972–1974	Serie 3	Francesco Speranza	(The Editorial Board 2013b).
1975–1991	Serie 4	Bianca Manfredi	(The Editorial Board 1993, p. I).
1992–1997	Serie 5	Gian Battista Rizza	(The Editorial Board 2013b)
1998–2001	Serie 6	Giampiero Spiga	(The Editorial Board 2013b)
2002–2008	Serie 7	Alessandra Lunardi	(The Editorial Board 2013b)
2009–2020	Serie 8 / Nuova Serie	Adriano Tomassini	(The Editorial Board 2013b)
2021–present	Nuova Serie	Alessandro Zaccagnini	(The Editorial Board 2013b)

== Structure ==
The current by-laws of the journal define its structure: in its present form, it states that the journal is directed by three controlling bodies, i.e. the editor in chief, the redaction committee or "Editorial Board", and the redaction secretariat:

The editor in chief is appointed by the rector of the University of Parma on a proposal of the Board of the Department of Mathematics and Computer Science of the University of Parma, and shall remain in office for four years: the candidate should be a university professor of the department itself, in office or retired.

The Editorial Board should be composed of four university mathematics professors, in office or retired, appointed by the rector on a proposal of the editor in chief and on the advice of Board of the Department of Mathematics and Computer Science: they remain in office for four years and, despite its formal expiry when a new editor in chief is appointed, they should continue to perform their duties until a new Editorial Board is appointed.

The editor in chief may seek the collaboration of an advisory board: if he chose to do so, he should appoint leading mathematicians in specific fields of research, on proposals of the editorial board. On its part, the appointed Advisory Board supports the scientific activity of the journal and does not perform any administrative duty.

== See also ==
- Rendiconti del Seminario Matematico della Università di Padova
- Rendiconti del Seminario Matematico Università e Politecnico di Torino
- Rendiconti di Matematica e delle sue Applicazioni
