= Biquaternion functions =

Functions of complex quaternions

Functions in the complex plane can be extended to functions of complex quaternions (biquaternions). This is simple when the function can be expressed as a power series. One simply replaces the complex argument by the complex quaternion argument. If the power series converges everywhere in the complex plane, it does for the complex quaternions too. Functions which have poles and branch points in the complex plane can be represented by power series in circles of convergence for complex arguments, but their behavior may be more complex. There may be complex quaternion argument values for which they are undefined and they may be multi-valued, just as they are in the complex plane

As we will see, quaternions are four dimensional and have a scalar part and a three-dimensional vector part. The bases of the vector part are non-commutative but the scalar part commutes with the vector part. The square of the vector part is just a number. This means that any power series in the quaternion is the sum of a scalar function and another scalar function multiplying the vector part. These two scalar functions are series sums of multinomials in the number that is the scalar part and the number that is the vector part squared.

This article examines for complex quaternion argument the exponential function, whose power series converges everywhere in the complex plane, the square root function, and the logarithm function.

== Definition ==
A quaternion Q can be written as

$$\textbf Q = a \, + b \, \textbf I + c \, \textbf J \, + d \, \textbf K$$

where a, b, c, d are complex numbers and

$$\textbf I \; \textbf I = \textbf J \; \textbf J = \textbf K \; \textbf K = \textbf I \; \textbf J \; \textbf K = -1$$

From these, using associativity, it follows that

$$\textbf I \; \textbf J = - \textbf J \; \textbf I = \textbf K \quad \textbf J \; \textbf K = - \textbf K \; \textbf J = \textbf I \quad \textbf K \; \textbf I = - \textbf I \; \textbf K = \textbf J \quad$$

The quaternions are a non-commutative associative algebra.

== Motivation ==
There are strong reasons to consider the complex quaternions. Many functions with a real quaternion argument only become defined with complex quaternions. This is similar to the case with the reals and the complex plane. An important application of the complex quaternions is to do Lorentz transformatons. The real quaternions can only do spatial rotations, but not to do Lorentz transformations with a boost. But the complex quaternions can.

== Norm ==
The norm is defined as

$$\textbf N (\textbf Q) = a^2+b^2+c^2+d^2$$

It is easily verified that

$$\textbf Q^{-1} = \frac{a-b\,\textbf I - c\,\textbf J - d \, \textbf K}{\textbf N(\textbf Q)}$$

The norm of a product is the product of the norms, making the complex quaternions a composition algebra:

$$\mathbf N(\mathbf Q_1 \, \mathbf Q_2) = \mathbf N(\mathbf Q_1) \; \mathbf N(\mathbf Q_2)$$

For a non-zero real quaternion, the norm is always positive real and the inverse always exists. This makes the real quaternions a division algebra.

== Power series split ==
Let the quaternion $\mathbf Q$ be written as the sum of its scalar and vector parts:

$$\mathbf Q=w+\mathbf v \, \text{ where } \, \mathbf v = b\, \mathbf I + c\, \mathbf J + d\, \mathbf K$$

Then by the vector product identity

$$\mathbf v \, \mathbf v = -v^2 = -b^2-c^2-d^2$$

By the binomial theorem

$$(w+\mathbf v)^n=\sum_{k=0}^{\infty}\binom{n}{2\,k} \, \mathbf v^{2\,k}\,w^{n-2\,k} + \sum_{k=0}^{\infty} \binom{n}{2\,k+1} \, \mathbf v^{2\,k+1}\,w^{n-2\,k-1}$$

so that

$$(w+\mathbf v)^n=\sum_{k=0}^{\infty}\binom{n}{2\,k} \, (-v^2)^k\,w^{n-2\,k} + \sum_{k=0}^{\infty} \binom{n}{2\,k+1} \, (-v^2)^k \, \mathbf v \, w^{n-2\,k-1}$$

This is the sum of a scalar and a acalar times $\mathbf v$. Thus a function $F(z)$ that is represented by a power series in complex z when extended to the quaternions has the property

$$F(\mathbf Q)=g(\mathbf Q)+h(\mathbf Q)\, \mathbf v$$

where the functions g and h are complex valued.

== Techniques ==
A technique that will be used in the following discussion is that given a power series in a complex quaternion X = a + b V where V V = -1, we can instead work with X = a + b I and, after evaluating the power series, replace I by V. Since V V is always a complex number, any quaternion whose vector part has non-zero norm can be put in this form. Let V = b I + c J + d K and suppose $\textbf V \, \textbf V = -(b^2+c^2+d^2)$ is non-zero. Then

$$\textbf V = \sqrt{b^2+c^2+d^2} \left [\frac{\textbf V}{\sqrt{b^2+c^2+d^2}} \right ]$$

The factor in square brackets has norm 1. The square root of the norm can be pulled out and absorbed into b. A vector quaternion whose norm is 1 (square equal to -1) will be called basis-like.

A second technique that will be used frequently is to realize that any power series in X = a + b V sums to the form c + d V where c and d are complex numbers, provided that the power series converges.

== Exponential function ==
The exponential function is well-defined by its power series, which converges over the entire domain, even for complex quaternions. Since the basic circular and hyperbolic functions cos, sin, cosh, sinh are linear combinations of exponential functions, they too are well-defined. Their inverses can be expressed in terms of the log and square root functions and don't always exist and are multi-valued when they do exist.

For a scalar w and a vector $\mathbf v$, by the Baker-Campbell-Hausdorff formula

$$\exp (w+\mathbf v)=\exp (w)\,\exp(\mathbf v)$$

since a scalar commutes with a vector. Define the complex $s=\sqrt {-\mathbf v \, \mathbf v}$. Using the result of the section on the power series split and using the power series for exp, cos, and sin, then for $s \ne 0$

$$\exp( \textbf v) = \cos(s) + \frac{\sin(s)}{s} \, \textbf v$$

Let $\mathbf v = s \, \mathbf n$. Then n has norm 1 and we have

$$\exp ( s \, \textbf n) = \cos (s) + \textbf n \, \sin(s)$$

Since n acts as a square root of -1 in this equation, this is nothing more than De Moivre's formula.

For the case $s=0$, the vector part v=N has zero norm, so that

$$\exp(a + b \, \textbf N) = \exp(a) \; ( 1 + b \textbf N)$$

Only the first two terms in the power series for $\exp(b \, \mathbf N)$ are non-zero.

== Square root function ==
The square root of a quaternion on a field has been treated more generally elsewhere.

Usually there are four values for the square root of a complex quaternion, but there can be infinitely many or none. We consider the special cases first.

For the special case of the square root of a complex number, any multiple by a quaternion with square +1 is also a solution. This includes -1 and vector quaternions of norm -1 such as i I, i J, i (I+J) / √2 and infinitely many more possibilities.

For the special case of the square root of a complex quaternion with a non-zero vector component N having zero norm, the square root does not exist except for special values

$$\sqrt{a \, (\frac{1}{4} + \, \textbf N)} = \pm \sqrt a \,(\frac{1}{2} + \, \textbf N)$$

For the special case of a vector quaternion with non-zero norm, we have

$$\sqrt {a \, \textbf I} = \sqrt a \; \frac{1 + \textbf I}{\sqrt 2}$$

Multiplying by -1, i I, or -i I give other values.

Having considered the special cases first, consider the complex quaternion a + b I with $a \neq 0 \text{ and } b \neq 0$. Since a can be factored out we only need to consider X = 1 + A I. We find

$$\sqrt \textbf X = \tfrac{1}{2} \big(\sqrt {1 + i\,A} + \sqrt {1 - i\,A} \, \big) - \tfrac{1}{2} i \, \big (\sqrt {1 + i\,A} - \sqrt {1 - i\,A} \, \big)\; \textbf I$$

The square roots are complex valued. Identical square roots need to be given identical values. Taking the four combinations of plus and minus for the two distinct complex square roots gives $\pm \sqrt \textbf X$ and $\pm i \, \mathbf I \, \sqrt \textbf X$.

== Logarithm function ==
As discussed in the literature, the logarithm of a spatial rotation is simple. This is because De Moivre's formula expresses it as an exponential

$$\exp \left ( \frac{\theta}{2} \; \mathbf n \right)= \cos \left ( \frac{\theta}{2} \right)+ \mathbf n \,\sin \left ( \frac{\theta}{2} \right)$$

Here $\theta$ is the angle of rotation about the axis represented by the real quaternion $\mathbf n$ with square -1. The logarithm is $\frac{\theta}{2}\, \mathbf n$. By letting $\theta$ be complex and by letting $\mathbf n$ be complex but still with square -1, the logarithm can be generalized. This is essentially what is done here.

The logarithm function log X sometimes does not exist, and, when it does, is multi-valued. The logarithm of a complex number is particularly multi-valued. Consider log(1). Some possible values are 2m π i + 2n π I and (2m+1) π i + (2n+1) π I for integers m and n. For I, any vector quaternion of norm +1 may be substituted.

We are to find log(X) such that exp(log(X))=X. Let $\mathbf X = a + b \, \mathbf I\;$. We first do the case for which both a and b are non-zero and for which the vector part has a non-zero norm so that it can be scaled to be basis-like with norm +1 (square equal to -1) and be represented by I.

Define the complex number θ by

$$\frac{b}{a} = \tan \theta\;$$

Let α be a complex number. Then

$$\exp(\alpha+\theta \, \textbf I)= \exp(\alpha)(\cos \theta + \sin \theta \; \textbf I) = \left (\frac{\exp \alpha \, \cos \theta}{a} \right )(a + b \, \textbf I)$$

Choose α so that the complex multiplier of a + b I on the right is one. Then a solution is

$$\log(a+b \, \textbf I)=\log \left ( \sqrt {a^2+b^2} \right ) + \tan^{-1}(\frac{b}{a}) \, \textbf I$$

As confirmation

$$\exp \left[\tan^{-1} \left(\frac{b}{a}\right) \, \mathbf I \right] = \cos \left[\tan^{-1} \left(\frac{b}{a}\right) \right] + \mathbf I \, \sin \left[\tan^{-1} \left(\frac{b}{a}\right) \right]$$

where De Moivre's formula has been used since I acts as a square root of -1 in this equation. So

$$\exp \left[\tan^{-1} \frac{b}{a}\, ) \, \mathbf I \right] = \frac{a}{\sqrt {a^2+b^2}} + \mathbf I \, \frac{b}{\sqrt {a^2+b^2}}$$

Adding 2m π i + 2n π I or adding (2m+1) π i + (2n+1) π I, where m and n are integers, also gives a solution.

Next find log(X) where X = a + N and N is a null non-zero vector quaternion. As easily verified

$$\log(a+\textbf N)=\log(a)+\frac{1}{a} \textbf N$$

Adding 2m π i also gives a solution.

The log of a quaternion that is a null vector quaternion N does not exist. The above equation diverges as $a\rightarrow 0$

The case of b=0 was discussed in the first paragraph. Lastly, log 0 is undefined.

== See also ==
- Biquaternion
- Quaternion
- Biquaternion algebra
- Quaternion algebra
- Hypercomplex number
- Hypercomplex analysis
