= Rendiconti del Seminario Matematico Università e Politecnico di Torino =

- Discipline: Mathematics
- Language: English, French, Italian
- Edited by: Emilio Musso

Publication details
- Former name: Conferenze di Fisica e di Matematica
- History: 1929–present
- Publisher: University of Turin (Italy)
- Frequency: Quarterly
- Open access: Yes

Standard abbreviations
- ISO 4: Rend. Semin. Mat. Univ. Politec. Torino

Indexing
- ISSN: 0373-1243
- LCCN: 51016361
- OCLC no.: 5231117

Links
- Journal homepage; Online archive

The Rendiconti del Seminario Matematico Università e Politecnico di Torino is a quarterly peer-reviewed mathematical journal published by the University of Turin and the Polytechnic University of Turin. It is the official journal of the Seminario Matematico dell'Università e Politecnico di Torino. It publishes research papers, invited lectures, and conference proceedings (special issues). Noticeable among invited lectures are the Lezioni Lagrangiane, a series of lectures which explore recent scientific progress and future developments in different fields of mathematics and are targeted to a wide public. The journal was established as the Conferenze di Fisica e di Matematica in 1929, obtaining its current name in 1947. The editor in chief is Emilio Musso (Polytechnic of Turin).

== Historical notice ==
=== Foundation ===
The journal was founded in 1929 as “Conferenze di Fisica e di Matematica della Reale Università e della Reale Scuola di Ingegneria di Torino”: this name was chosen due to opposition of Carlo Somigliana to the use of the term "Seminario" (English: "seminar").

== See also ==
- Rendiconti del Seminario Matematico della Università di Padova
- Rendiconti di Matematica e delle sue Applicazioni
- Rivista di Matematica della Università di Parma
