= Rendiconti del Seminario Matematico della Università di Padova =

- Discipline: Mathematics
- Language: English
- Edited by: Andrea D'Agnolo

Publication details
- History: 1930–present
- Publisher: Seminario Matematico of the University of Padua
- Frequency: Biannual
- Impact factor: 0.311 (2009)

Standard abbreviations
- ISO 4: Rend. Semin. Mat. Univ. Padova

Indexing
- ISSN: 0041-8994
- LCCN: 50046633
- OCLC no.: 01761704

Links
- Journal homepage; Online access

Rendiconti del Seminario Matematico della Università di Padova (The Mathematical Journal of the University of Padua) is a peer-reviewed mathematics journal published by Seminario Matematico of the University of Padua, established in 1930.

The journal is indexed by Mathematical Reviews and Zentralblatt MATH. Its 2009 MCQ was 0.22, and its 2009 impact factor was 0.311.

== See also ==
- Rendiconti del Seminario Matematico Università e Politecnico di Torino
- Rendiconti di Matematica e delle sue Applicazioni
- Rivista di Matematica della Università di Parma
