= Mario Pulvirenti =

Italian academician

- Born: 1946 (age 79–80); Rome, Italy
- Awards: Tartufari prize, 2006, from Accademia dei Lincei
- Scientific career
- Fields: mathematical physics statistical mechanics
- Workplaces: Sapienza University; Accademia dei Lincei; Istituto Nazionale di Alta Matematica

Mario Pulvirenti is an Italian mathematician, Professor emeritus of Mathematical Physics at Sapienza University of Rome.

== Biography ==
Mario Pulvirenti received a master's degree in physics from the Sapienza University in 1970, where he is Professor emeritus of Mathematical Physics. He also worked at University of L'Aquila and University of Camerino. He spent research periods at École Normale Supérieure, Institut des Hautes Études Scientifiques and Rutgers University. He is currently member of Istituto Nazionale di Alta Matematica and of Accademia dei Lincei, one of the highest Italian academic institutions.

In 2006 has been invited speaker at International Congress of Mathematicians in Madrid. In the same year he won the Tartufari prize form Accademia dei Lincei.

He is one of the major experts in mathematical aspects of kinetic theory, and among his research topics are also fluid dynamics and statistical mechanics. In particular, he obtained (together with Reinhard Illner) the only rigorous global derivation in time of the Boltzmann equation from particle dynamics known up to now. He is also interested in clarifying some particular aspects of history of mechanics.

== Bibliography ==
- Global validity of the Boltzmann equation for a two-dimensional rare gas in vacuum (with R. Illner). Communications in Mathematical Physics, 105(2), 189–203 (1986).
- Global validity of the Boltzmann equation for two-and three-dimensional rare gas in vacuum: Erratum and improved result (with R. Illner). Communications in Mathematical Physics, 121(1), 143–146 (1989).
- Kinetic equations and asymptotic theory. Ed. by Benoît Perthame and Laurent Desvillettes. Series in Applied Mathematics (Paris). 4. Paris: Gauthier-Villars/ Elsevier (with F.Bouchut, F.Golse, B.Perthame e L.Desvillettes), (2000). ISBN 2-84299-110-9
- The mathematical theory of dilute gases. Applied Mathematical Sciences. 106. New York, NY: Springer-Verlag (with C. Cercignani), (1994). ISBN 0-387-94294-7
- Nonequilibrium problems in many-particle systems. Lectures given at the 3rd Session of the Centro Internazionale Matematico Estivo (C.I.M.E.) held in Montecatini, Italy, June 15–27, 1992. Lecture Notes in Mathematics. 1551. Berlin: Springer-Verlag (with C. Cercignani), (1993). ISBN 3-540-56945-6
- Vortex methods in two-dimensional fluid dynamics. Lecture Notes in Physics, 203. Berlin etc.: Springer-Verlag (with C. Marchioro), (1984).
- Propagation of chaos and effective equations in kinetic theory: a brief survey (with S. Simonella), Mathematics and Mechanics of Complex Systems, Vol. 4 (2016), No. 3-4, 255–274.
