= Rizza (surname) =

Rizza is an Italian surname that may refer to

- Audrey La Rizza (born 1981), French judoka
- Gilda dalla Rizza (1892–1975), Italian soprano
- Giovanni Battista Rizza (1924–2018), Italian mathematician
- Giuseppe Rizza (1987–2020), Italian football defender
- Manfredi Rizza (born 1991), Italian canoeist
- Margaret Rizza (born 1929), English composer, primarily of church music
