= Debbie Frizza =

Australian cricketer

Personal information
- Full name: Deborah Frizza
- Role: Batter

Domestic team information
- Years: Team
- 1990/91–1996/97: Victoria

Career statistics
Competition	WLA
Matches	9
Runs scored	144
Batting average	20.57
100s/50s	0/1
Top score	66
Balls bowled	6
Wickets	0
Bowling average	–
5 wickets in innings	–
10 wickets in match	–
Best bowling	–
Catches/stumpings	0/–
- Source: CricketArchive, 29 June 2021

Deborah Frizza is a former Australian cricketer. She played nine matches for Victoria (1990/91–1996/97), including during the side's first season in the Women's National Cricket League (WNCL).

Frizza also played 165 matches for Essendon Maribyrnong Park Ladies Cricket Club (EMPLCC).
