= Beniamino Segre =

Italian mathematician (1903–1977)

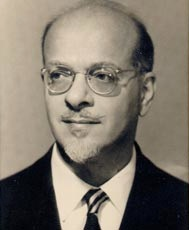
- Born: 16 February 1903; Turin, Italy
- Died: 2 October 1977 (aged 74); Frascati, Kingdom of Italy
- Known for: Segre's theorem Segre class Segre surface
- Relatives: Corrado Segre (mother's cousin)
- Scientific career
- Fields: Algebraic geometry; Finite geometry; Theory of differential forms; Several complex variables
- Thesis: Genera della curva doppia per la varietà di $S_4$ che annulla un determinante simmetrico (1923)
- Academic advisors: Corrado Segre; Francesco Severi

President of the Accademia nazionale delle scienze
- In office 6 May 1974 – 22 September 1977
- Preceded by: Domenico Marotta
- Succeeded by: Pietro Di Mattei

Beniamino Segre (16 February 1903 – 2 October 1977) was an Italian mathematician who is remembered today as a major contributor to algebraic geometry and one of the founders of finite geometry.

== Life and career ==
He was born and studied in Turin. Corrado Segre, a cousin of his mother, served as his academic advisor.

Among his main contributions to algebraic geometry are studies of birational invariants of algebraic varieties, singularities and algebraic surfaces. His work was in the style of the old Italian School, although he also appreciated the greater rigour of modern algebraic geometry.

Segre was a pioneer in finite geometry, in particular projective geometry based on vector spaces over a finite field. In a well-known paper (Segre 1955) he proved the following theorem: In a Desarguesian plane of odd order, the ovals are exactly the irreducible conics. In 1959 he authored a survey "Le geometrie di Galois" on Galois geometry. According to J. W. P. Hirschfeld, it "gave a comprehensive list of results and methods, and is to my mind the seminal paper in the subject."

Some critics felt that his work was no longer geometry, but today it is recognized as a separate sub-discipline: finite geometry or combinatorial geometry. According to Hirschfeld, "He published the most as well as the deepest papers in the subject. His enormous knowledge of classical algebraic geometry enabled him to identify those results which could be applied to finite spaces. His theorem on the characterization of conics (Segre's theorem) not only stimulated a great deal of research but also made many mathematicians realize that finite spaces were worth studying."

In 1938 he lost his professorship at the University of Bologna, as a result of the anti-Jewish laws enacted under Benito Mussolini's government. He spent the next 8 years in Britain (mostly at the University of Manchester), then returned to Italy to resume his academic career.

== Selected publications ==
- Segre, Beniamino (1942), The non-singular cubic surfaces, Oxford: Clarendon Press, pp. XI+180, JFM 68.0358.01, MR 0008171, Zbl 0061.36701.
- Segre, Beniamino (1945), "Arithmetic upon an algebraic surface", Bulletin of the American Mathematical Society, 51 (2): 152–161, doi:10.1090/s0002-9904-1945-08300-1, MR 0011565, Zbl 0061.07105
- Segre, Beniamino (1948), Lezioni di geometria moderna. Vol. 1. Fondamenti di geometria sopra un corpo qualsiasi [Lectures on modern geometry. Vol. 1. Foundations of geometry over any division ring] (in Italian), Bologna: Zanichelli, pp. IV+195, MR 0030204, Zbl 0030.41005. The second volume was never published: however an updated and largely expanded English edition was published as: Segre, Beniamino (1961) [1948], Lectures on modern geometry, Monografie Matematiche del Consiglio Nazionale delle Ricerche, vol. 7, With an appendix by Lucio Lombardo–Radice (2nd ed.), Roma: Edizioni Cremonese, pp. XV+479, MR 0131192, Zbl 0095.14802.
- Segre, Beniamino (1951), Forme differenziali e loro integrali. Volume primo. Calcolo algebrico esterno e proprietà differenziali locali [Differential forms and their integrals. Volume one. Algebraic exterior calculus and local differential properties], Istituto Nazionale di Alta Matematica (in Italian), Roma: Docet edizioni universitarie, p. 520, MR 0049646, Zbl 0045.19702.
- Segre, Beniamino (1951b), Arithmetical Questions on Algebraic Varieties, London: The Athlone Press, pp. V+55, MR 0043498, Zbl 0042.15204.
- Segre, Beniamino (1955), "Ovals in a finite projective plane", Canadian Journal of Mathematics, 7: 414–416, doi:10.4153/CJM-1955-045-x, ISSN 0008-414X, MR 0071034
- Segre, Beniamino (1956), Forme differenziali e loro integrali. Volume secondo. Omologia, coomologia, corrispondenze ed integrali sulle varietà [Differential forms and their integrals. Volume two. Homology, cohomology, mappings and integrals on manifolds], Istituto Nazionale di Alta Matematica (in Italian), Roma: Docet edizioni universitarie, p. 422, MR 0087989, Zbl 0073.07803.
- Segre, Beniamino (1957), Some Properties of Differentiable Varieties and Transformations: With Special Reference to the Analytic and Algebraic Cases, Ergebnisse der Mathematik und ihrer Grenzgebiete. Neue Folge, vol. Heft 13, Berlin–Heidelberg–New York: Springer-Verlag, pp. VIII+183, doi:10.1007/978-3-642-52764-7, ISBN 978-3-642-52766-1, Zbl 0081.37404 (also available with ISBN 978-3-642-52764-7 (ebook)).
- Segre, Beniamino (1971) [1955], Some Properties of Differentiable Varieties and Transformations: With Special Reference to the Analytic and Algebraic Cases, Ergebnisse der Mathematik und ihrer Grenzgebiete. Neue Folge, vol. Heft 13, With an additional part written in collaboration with J. W. P. Hirschfeld (2nd ed.), Berlin–Heidelberg–New York: Springer-Verlag, pp. IX+195, doi:10.1007/978-3-642-65006-2, ISBN 3-540-05085-X, MR 0278222 (also available with ISBN 0-387-05085-X, ISBN 978-3-642-65008-6 (softcover reprint) and ISBN 978-3-642-65006-2 (ebook)).
- Segre, Beniamino (1972), Prodromi di geometria algebrica [Principles of algebraic geometry] (in Italian), con un'appendice di U. Bartocci e M. Lorenzani, Roma: Edizioni Cremonese, pp. VI+412, ISBN 88-7083-426-3, Zbl 0281.14001
- Segre, Beniamino (1987), Opere scelte. Volume I [Selected works. Volume I], Opere dei Grandi Matematici Italiani (in Italian, English, French, and German), Roma: Edizioni Cremonese, pp. LI+420, Zbl 1098.01521.
- Segre, Beniamino (1999), Opere scelte. Volume II [Selected works. Volume II], Opere dei Grandi Matematici Italiani (in Italian, English, French, and German), Roma: Edizioni Cremonese, pp. XXII+460, Zbl 1098.01520
- Segre, Beniamino (2000), Opere scelte. Volume III [Selected works. Volume III], Opere dei Grandi Matematici Italiani (in Italian, English, French, and German), Roma: Edizioni Cremonese, pp. VIII+456, Zbl 1098.01522.
