= Chain (algebraic topology) =

Formal linear combination in a cell complex

In algebraic topology, a k-chain is a formal linear combination of the k-cells in a cell complex. In simplicial complexes (respectively, cubical complexes), k-chains are combinations of k-simplices (respectively, k-cubes), but not necessarily connected. Chains are used in homology; the elements of a homology group are equivalence classes of chains.

== Definition ==
For a simplicial complex $X$, the group $C_n(X)$ of $n$-chains of $X$ is given by:

$C_n(X) = \left\{ \sum\limits_i m_i \sigma_i | m_i \in \mathbb{Z} \right\}$

where $\sigma_i$ are singular $n$-simplices of $X$. Note that an element in $C_n(X)$ is not necessarily a connected simplicial complex.

== Integration on chains ==
Integration is defined on chains by taking the linear combination of integrals over the simplices in the chain with coefficients (which are typically integers). The set of all k-chains forms a group and the sequence of these groups is called a chain complex.

== Boundary operator on chains ==
The boundary of a polygonal curve is a linear combination of its nodes; in this case, some linear combination of A_{1} through A_{6}. Assuming the segments all are oriented left-to-right (in increasing order from A_{k} to A_{k+1}), the boundary is A_{6} − A_{1}.

A closed polygonal curve, assuming consistent orientation, has null boundary.

The boundary of a chain is the linear combination of boundaries of the simplices in the chain. The boundary of a k-chain is a (k−1)-chain. Note that the boundary of a simplex is not a simplex, but a chain with coefficients 1 or −1 – thus chains are the closure of simplices under the boundary operator.

Example 1: The boundary of a path is the formal difference of its endpoints: it is a telescoping sum. To illustrate, if the 1-chain $c = t_1 + t_2 + t_3\,$ is a path from point $v_1\,$ to point $v_4\,$, where $t_1=[v_1, v_2]\,$, $t_2=[v_2, v_3]\,$ and $t_3=[v_3, v_4]\,$ are its constituent 1-simplices, then

$$\begin{align}
\partial_1 c
&= \partial_1(t_1 + t_2 + t_3)\\
&= \partial_1(t_1) + \partial_1(t_2) + \partial_1(t_3)\\
&= \partial_1([v_1, v_2]) + \partial_1([v_2, v_3]) + \partial_1([v_3, v_4]) \\
&= ([v_2]-[v_1]) + ([v_3]-[v_2]) + ([v_4]-[v_3]) \\
&= [v_4]-[v_1].
\end{align}$$

Example 2: The boundary of the triangle is a formal sum of its edges with signs arranged to make the traversal of the boundary counterclockwise.

A chain is called a cycle when its boundary is zero. A chain that is the boundary of another chain is called a boundary. Boundaries are cycles, so chains form a chain complex, whose homology groups (cycles modulo boundaries) are called simplicial homology groups.

Example 3: The plane punctured at the origin has nontrivial 1-homology group since the unit circle is a cycle, but not a boundary.

In differential geometry, the duality between the boundary operator on chains and the exterior derivative is expressed by the general Stokes' theorem.
