= Rizza manifold =

Manifold in differential geometry

In differential geometry a Rizza manifold, named after Giovanni Battista Rizza, is an almost complex manifold also supporting a Finsler structure: this kind of manifold is also referred as almost Hermitian Finsler manifold.

== History ==
The history of Rizza manifolds follows the history of the structure that such objects carry. According to Shoshichi Kobayashi (1975), the geometry of complex Finsler structures was first studied in Rizza's 1964 paper "F-forme quadratiche ed hermitiane", but Rizza announced his results nearly two years before, in the short communications (Rizza 1962a) and (Rizza 1962b), proving them in the article (Rizza 1963), nearly one year earlier than the one cited by Kobayashi. Rizza called this differential geometric structure, defined on even-dimensional manifolds, "Struttura di Finsler quasi Hermitiana": his motivation for the introduction of the concept seems to be the aim of comparing two different structures existing on the same manifold. Later Ichijyō (1988, p. 1) started calling this structure "Rizza structure", and manifolds carrying it "Rizza manifolds".

== Formal definition ==
The content of this paragraph closely follows references (Rizza 1963) and (Ichijyō 1988), borrowing the scheme of notation equally from both sources. Precisely, given a differentiable manifold $M$ and one of its points $x\in M$,

- $TM$ is the tangent bundle of $M$;
- $T_xM$ is the tangent space at $x$;

Definition 1. Let $M$ be a $2n$-dimensional Finsler manifold, $n\ge 1$, and let $F:TM\to\R$ its Finsler function. If the condition

(1) $F(x,cy)=|c|F(x,y)\qquad\forall c\in\mathbb{C},\quad x\in M,\quad y\in T_xM$

holds true, then $M$ is a Rizza manifold.

== See also ==
- Almost complex manifold
- Complex manifold
- Finsler manifold
- Hermitian manifold
