= Monogenic function =

A monogenic function is a complex function with a single finite derivative. More precisely, a function $f(z)$ defined on $A \subseteq \mathbb{C}$ is called monogenic at $\zeta \in A$, if $f'(\zeta)$ exists and is finite, with:
$$f'(\zeta) = \lim_{z\to\zeta}\frac{f(z) - f(\zeta)}{z - \zeta}$$

Alternatively, it can be defined as the above limit having the same value for all paths. Functions can either have a single derivative (monogenic) or infinitely many derivatives (polygenic), with no intermediate cases. Furthermore, a function $f(x)$ which is monogenic $\forall \zeta \in B$, is said to be monogenic on $B$, and if $B$ is a domain of $\mathbb{C}$, then it is analytic as well (The notion of domains can also be generalized in a manner such that functions which are monogenic over non-connected subsets of $\mathbb{C}$, can show a weakened form of analyticity)

The term monogenic was coined by Cauchy.
