= Fabio Conforto =

Italian mathematician

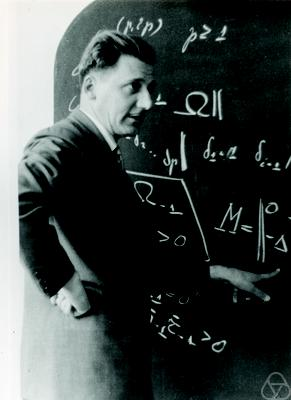
- Born: 13 August 1909; Triest, Austria-Hungary
- Died: 24 February 1954 (aged 44); Rome, Italy
- Education: Sapienza University of Rome
- Scientific career
- Fields: Mathematics

Fabio Conforto (13 August 1909 – 24 February 1954) was an Italian mathematician. His contributed to the fields of algebraic geometry, projective geometry and analytic geometry.
