= Enrico Bompiani =

Italian mathematician (1889–1975)

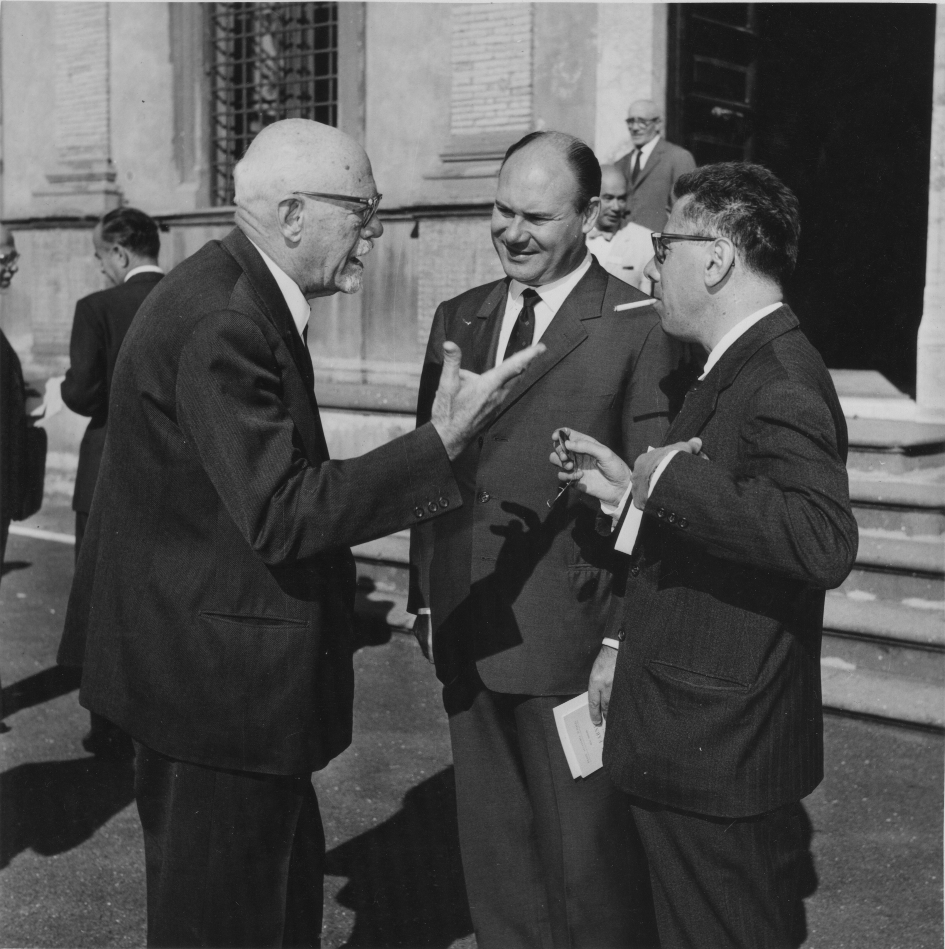
- The International Symposium on Algebraic Geometry held in Rome in 1965. Enrico Bompiani talking to Giovanni Battista Rizza and Vittorio Dalla Volta.
- Born: February 12, 1889; Rome, Italy
- Died: September 22, 1975 (aged 86); Rome, Italy
- Education: Sapienza University of Rome
- Scientific career
- Institutions: University of Milan; University of Bologna; Sapienza University of Rome
- Doctoral advisor: Guido Castelnuovo
- Other academic advisors: Francesco Gerbaldi

Enrico Bompiani (12 February 1889 – 22 September 1975) was an Italian mathematician, specializing in differential geometry.

== Education and career ==
Bompiani received his Ph.D. (laurea) in 1910 under Guido Castelnuovo at the Sapienza University of Rome with thesis Spazio rigato a quattro dimensioni e spazio cerchiato ordinario. Until 1913 he remained in Rome as an assistant to Guido Castelnuovo and then, from 16 October 1913 to 30 October 1915, he was at the University of Pavia as an assistant to Francesco Gerbaldi. In December 1915 he became a docent lecturing on analytic geometry at the Sapienza University of Rome, where in 1922 he became an assistant professor (professore incaricato). In 1922 he won a competition for a professorial chair at the University of Milan, where he taught in 1922–1923. From 1923 to 1926 he was a professor at the University of Bologna. Near the end of 1926 he returned to Rome to become a professor for descriptive geometry (and then differential geometry and higher mathematical analysis) at the Sapienza University of Rome, remaining in this capacity until his retirement as professor emeritus in 1964. From 1939 to 1959 he was the director of the Mathematical Institute of the University of the Rome. He was on the editorial board of Rendiconti di Matematica e delle sue applicazioni from 1940 to 1959.

Bompiani was an invited speaker at the International Congress of Mathematicians in 1912 at Cambridge (England) and in 1928 at Bologna. He was a visiting professor at the University of Chicago, the University of Missouri–Kansas City, and the University of Pittsburgh.

Bompiani wrote textbooks on projective, analytic, descriptive, and non-Euclidean geometry.

== Honors and awards ==
Bompiani won in 1923 the mathematics prize of the Fondazione Besso and in 1926 the gold medal of the Società italiana delle scienze detta dei XL. In 1935 he became a corresponding member of the Accademia dei Lincei, in 1938 he won the royal prize (premio reale) of the Accademia, and in 1942 he became a full member of the Accademia. He was also a member of the academies of Bologna, Turin, Brussels, and Liège, the Istituto Lombardo Accademia di Scienze e Lettere, and the Austrian Academy of Sciences. He received honorary doctorates from Groningen, Bologna, and Jassy. He was from 1941 to 1964 on the scientific advisory board of Rome's Istituto nazionale di alta matematica and from 1926 to 1959 on the committee for physics and mathematics of the Consiglio nazionale delle ricerche. From 1951 to 1954 he was the secretary of the International Mathematical Union. From 1949 to 1952 he was the president of the Unione matematica italiana.

== Sources ==
- Ciliberto, Ciro; Del Colombo, Emma Sallent: Enrico Bompiani: the years in Bologna.
