= Francesco Severi =

Italian mathematician (1879–1961)

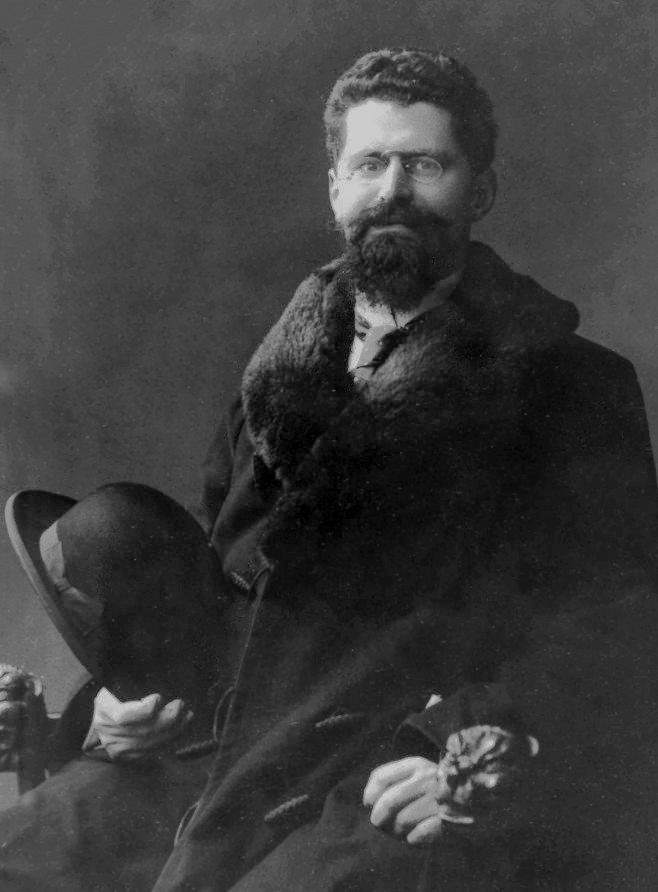
- Born: 13 April 1879; Arezzo, Italy
- Died: 8 December 1961 (aged 82); Rome, Italy
- Education: Università di Torino, 1900
- Known for: Algebraic geometry, several complex variables
- Awards: Gold medal of the Accademia Nazionale delle Scienze detta dei XL (1906); Prix Bordin (1907) (jointly with Federigo Enriques); Guccia Medal (1908) "Premio reale" of the Accademia Nazionale dei Lincei (1913)
- Scientific career
- Fields: Mathematics
- Workplaces: Università di Torino, Università di Bologna, Università di Padova, Università di Roma, Istituto Nazionale di Alta Matematica (now Istituto Nazionale di Alta Matematica Francesco Severi)
- Academic advisors: Corrado Segre; Enrico D'Ovidio; Federigo Enriques; Eugenio Bertini
- Notable students: Aldo Andreotti, Gaetano Fichera, Luigi Fantappiè, Enzo Martinelli, Guido Zappa

President of the Accademia nazionale delle scienze
- In office 30 January 1949 – 8 December 1961
- Preceded by: Aldo Castellani
- Succeeded by: Domenico Marotta

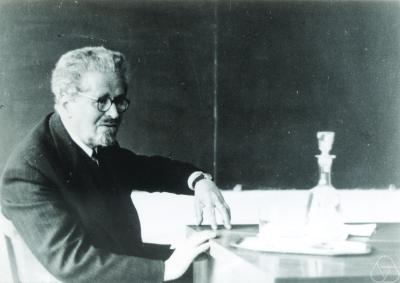
Francesco Severi (photo by Konrad Jacobs)

Francesco Severi (13 April 1879 – 8 December 1961) was an Italian mathematician. He was the chair of the committee on Fields Medal in 1936, at the first delivery.

Severi was born in Arezzo, Italy. He is famous for his contributions to algebraic geometry and the theory of functions of several complex variables. He became the effective leader of the Italian school of algebraic geometry. Together with Federigo Enriques, he won the Prix Bordin from the French Academy of Sciences.

He contributed in a major way to birational geometry, the theory of algebraic surfaces, in particular of the curves lying on them, the theory of moduli spaces and the theory of functions of several complex variables. He wrote prolifically, and some of his work (following the intuition-led approach of Federigo Enriques) has subsequently been shown to be not rigorous according to the then new standards set in particular by Oscar Zariski and André Weil. Although many of his arguments have since been made rigorous, a significant fraction were not only lacking in rigor but also wrong (in contrast to the work of Enriques, which though not rigorous was almost entirely correct). At the personal level, according to Roth (1963) he was easily offended, and he was involved in a number of controversies. Most notably, he was a staunch supporter of the Italian fascist regime of Benito Mussolini and was included on a committee of academics that was to conduct an antisemitic purge of all scholarly societies and academic institutions.

== Biography ==
His childhood was marked by the death of his father, which occurred when he was 9 years old. This had serious economic repercussions on their family. Although he had to earn a living while conducting private lessons, Francesco Severi managed to continue his studies and enroll in the engineering course at the University of Turin. Due to the influence of courses by Corrado Segre, Severi quickly found a passion for pure mathematics.

In 1900, he completed his training with a thesis in the geometry of numbers, which would later become his favorite subject.

After his thesis, he became assistant to Enrico D'Ovidio at the University of Turin and from 1902 to 1905, he was a lecturer in projective and descriptive geometry. But soon, he obtained his transfer to the University of Bologna as assistant to Federigo Enriques. Then at the University of Pisa as assistant to Eugenio Bertini.

In 1904, in consideration of the results he obtained in the geometry of numbers (founding the theory of birational invariants of algebraic surfaces), he obtained the chair of projective and descriptive geometry at the University of Parma. However, he spent a year at the University of Padua. where, he teaches different subjects, and takes the direction of the engineering unit.

In 1906, he obtained a theorem of existence of algebraic curves drawn on certain types of surfaces, thus beginning the search for the classification of rational surfaces.

Mobilized during World War I, Severi enlisted in the artillery.

In 1921, he obtained the chair of algebraic geometry at La Sapienza University in Rome.

In 1923, he was elected rector of this university. But in 1925, following the assassination of the socialist politician Matteotti, he gave up his duties as rector. Nevertheless, Severi would remain without reaction against fascism and would accept the application of the racial laws.

In 1938, Severi was one of the founders of the Istituto Nazionale di Alta Matematica. Oscar Zariski is one of his most famous students.

In 1959, he converted to Catholicism and published his autobiography Dalla scienza alla fede (1959), he repents of his lack of political discernment

Mathematics is the art of giving the same name to various things, and mathematicians often make mistakes in politics, because it is, conversely, the art of giving different names to identical things.

During his career, Severi received numerous awards, including the Gold Medal of the National Academy of Sciences and, together with Federigo Enriques, the Bordin Prize of the Paris Academy of Sciences (this award, created in 1835 by Charles-Laurent Bordin is a biennial prize awarded to authors of works on subjects of public interest).

He was a member of numerous Italian and foreign academies, including the Accademia dei Lincei in 1910 and the Accademia delle Scienze di Torino in 1918.

== Selected publications ==
His scientific production includes more than 400 publications and numerous treatises. All the mathematical works of Francesco Severi, except all books, are collected in the six volumes of his "Opere Matematiche".

- Severi, Francesco (2 March 1931), "Sur une propriété fondamentale des fonctions analytiques de plusieurs variables", Comptes rendus hebdomadaires des séances de l'Académie des sciences (in French), 192: 596–599, Zbl 0001.14802, available at Gallica. The paper containing the first proof of Morera's theorem for holomorphic functions of several variables.
- Severi, Francesco (1931a), "Risoluzione del problema generale di Dirichlet per le funzioni biarmoniche" [Solution of the general Dirichlet problem for biharmonic functions], Rendiconti della Accademia Nazionale dei Lincei, Classe di Scienze Fisiche, Matematiche e Naturali, series 6 (in Italian), 13: 795–804, JFM 57.0393.01, Zbl 0002.34202. The announce of the solution of the Dirichlet problem for pluriharmonic functions for domains with real analytic boundaries.
- Severi, Francesco (1932), "Una proprietà fondamentale dei campi di olomorfismo di una funzione analitica di una variabile reale e di una variabile complessa" [A fundamental property of the domain of holomorphy of an analytic function of one real variable and one complex variable], Rendiconti della Accademia Nazionale dei Lincei, Classe di Scienze Fisiche, Matematiche e Naturali, series 6 (in Italian), 15: 487–490, JFM 58.0352.05, Zbl 0004.40702. In this paper Severi describes the "passage from real to complex" method he developed in order to deal with several problems in the theory of functions of several complex variables.
- Severi, Francesco (1942–1943), "A proposito d'un teorema di Hartogs" [About a theorem of Hartogs], Commentarii Mathematici Helvetici (in Italian), 15 (1): 350–352, doi:10.1007/bf02565650, MR 0010730, S2CID 120514642, Zbl 0028.15301. In this work Severi gives his proof of the Hartogs' extension theorem.
- Severi, Francesco (1958), Lezioni sulle funzioni analitiche di più variabili complesse – Tenute nel 1956–57 all'Istituto Nazionale di Alta Matematica in Roma [Lectures on analytic functions of several complex variables – Lectured in 1956–57 at the Istituto Nazionale di Alta Matematica in Rome] (in Italian), Padova: CEDAM – Casa Editrice Dott. Antonio Milani, pp. XIV+255, Zbl 0094.28002. Notes from a course held by Francesco Severi at the Istituto Nazionale di Alta Matematica (which at present bears his name), containing appendices of Enzo Martinelli, Giovanni Battista Rizza and Mario Benedicty.
- Severi, Francesco (1971), Opere matematiche. Memorie e note Vol. I (PDF) (in Italian), Roma: Accademia Nazionale dei Lincei (distributed by Bardi Editore), pp. XLII+491, MR 0701703, Zbl 0582.01027 (available from the "Edizione Nazionale Mathematica Italiana"). His "Mathematical works, Memoirs and Notes": the complete collection, with the exception of books, of Francesco Severi's scientific contributions. The reprinted works, written in Italian, French, German, retain their original language in an improved typographical form amended from typographical errors and author's oversights: also, a comment of Severi was added to several papers. Volume I collects works published from 1900 to 1908.
- Severi, Francesco (1974), Opere matematiche. Memorie e note Vol. II (PDF) (in Italian), Roma: Accademia Nazionale dei Lincei (distributed by Bardi Editore), p. 567, MR 0701702, Zbl 0582.01027 (available from the "Edizione Nazionale Mathematica Italiana"). His "Mathematical works, Memoirs and Notes": the complete collection, with the exception of books, of Francesco Severi's scientific contributions. The reprinted works, written in Italian, French, German, retain their original language in an improved typographical form amended from typographical errors and author's oversights: also, a comment of Severi was added to several papers. Volume II collects works published from 1909 to 1917.
- Severi, Francesco (1977), Opere matematiche. Memorie e note Vol. III (PDF) (in Italian), Roma: Accademia Nazionale dei Lincei (distributed by Bardi Editore), p. 603, MR 0701700, Zbl 0582.01027 (available from the "Edizione Nazionale Mathematica Italiana"). His "Mathematical works, Memoirs and Notes": the complete collection, with the exception of books, of Francesco Severi's scientific contributions. The reprinted works, written in Italian, French, German, retain their original language in an improved typographical form amended from typographical errors and author's oversights: also, a comment of Severi was added to several papers. Volume III collects works published from 1918 to 1932.
- Severi, Francesco (1980), Opere matematiche. Memorie e note Vol. IV (PDF) (in Italian), Roma: Accademia Nazionale dei Lincei (distributed by Bardi Editore), p. 603, MR 0701701, Zbl 0582.01027 (available from the "Edizione Nazionale Mathematica Italiana"). His "Mathematical works, Memoirs and Notes": the complete collection, with the exception of books, of Francesco Severi's scientific contributions. The reprinted works, written in Italian, French, German, retain their original language in an improved typographical form amended from typographical errors and author's oversights: also, a comment of Severi was added to several papers. Volume IV collects works published from 1933 to 1941.
- Severi, Francesco (1988), Opere matematiche. Memorie e note Vol. V (PDF) (in Italian), Roma: Accademia Nazionale dei Lincei (distributed by Bardi Editore), p. 553, MR 1030994 (available from the "Edizione Nazionale Mathematica Italiana"). His "Mathematical works, Memoirs and Notes": the complete collection, with the exception of books, of Francesco Severi's scientific contributions. The reprinted works, written in Italian, French, German, retain their original language in an improved typographical form amended from typographical errors and author's oversights: also, a comment of Severi was added to several papers. Volume V collects works published from 1942 to 1948.
- Severi, Francesco (1989), Opere matematiche. Memorie e note Vol. VI (PDF) (in Italian), Roma: Accademia Nazionale dei Lincei (distributed by Bardi Editore), p. 499, MR 1030995 (available from the "Edizione Nazionale Mathematica Italiana"). His "Mathematical works, Memoirs and Notes": the complete collection, with the exception of books, of Francesco Severi's scientific contributions. The reprinted works, written in Italian, French, German, retain their original language in an improved typographical form amended from typographical errors and author's oversights: also, a comment of Severi was added to several papers. Volume VI collects works published from 1949 to 1961.

=== Articles on Scientia ===
- (in Italian) Ipotesi e realta nelle scienze geometriche, Scientia: rivista internazionale di sintesi scientifica, 8, 1910, pp. 1–29
- (in Italian) Esame delle obiezioni d'ordine generale contro la relatività del tempo, Scientia: rivista internazionale di sintesi scientifica, 37, 1925, pp. 77–86
- (in Italian) Elementi logici e psicologici dei principi di relatività, Scientia: rivista internazionale di sintesi scientifica, 37, 1925, pp. 1–10
- (in Italian) Materia e causalità, energia e indeterminazione, Scientia: rivista internazionale di sintesi scientifica, 81, 1947, pp. 49–59
- (in Italian) Leonardo e la matematica, Scientia: rivista internazionale di sintesi scientifica, 88, 1953, pp. 41–44
- (in Italian) I fondamenti logici della relatività, Scientia: rivista internazionale di sintesi scientifica, 90, 1955, pp. 277–282
- (in Italian) La matematica nella prima metà del secolo XX, Scientia: rivista internazionale di sintesi scientifica, 92, 1957, pp. 20–26

==== Reviews ====
- (in French) Albert Einstein, L'ether et la theorie de la relativité, Scientia: rivista internazionale di sintesi scientifica, 91, 1956, pp. 42–43
- (in French) Eric Temple Bell, Les mathematiques reines et servantes des sciences, Scientia: rivista internazionale di sintesi scientifica, 90, 1955, pp. 371–372
- (in French) Nikolaus Von Cues, Die Mathematische Schriften, Scientia: rivista internazionale di sintesi scientifica, 89, 1954, pp. 34–34
- (in French) Ludovico Geymonat, Saggi di Filosofia neorazionalista, Scientia: rivista internazionale di sintesi scientifica, 89, 1954, pp. 176–176
- (in French) Norbert Wiener, Introduzione alla cibernetica, Scientia: rivista internazionale di sintesi scientifica, 88, 1953, pp. 312–313
- (in Italian) Eric Temple Bell, I grandi Matematici, Scientia: rivista internazionale di sintesi scientifica, 86, 1951, pp. 183–184
- (in Italian) Richard Courant e Herbert Robbins, Che cos'è la matematica?, Scientia: rivista internazionale di sintesi scientifica, 86, 1951, pp. 278–279
- (in French) Gottlob Frege, Aritmetica e Logica, Scientia: rivista internazionale di sintesi scientifica, 84, 1949, pp. 144–144

== See also ==
- Istituto Nazionale di Alta Matematica Francesco Severi
- Italian school of algebraic geometry
- Morera's theorem
- Néron–Severi group
- Pluriharmonic function
- Several complex variables
- Severi–Brauer variety
