= Shafarevich theorem =

In mathematics, the Shafarevich theorem, named for Igor Shafarevich, may refer to:

- Néron–Ogg–Shafarevich criterion
- Golod–Shafarevich theorem about class field towers
- Grothendieck–Ogg–Shafarevich formula
- Shafarevich's theorem on solvable Galois groups
- Shafarevich–Weil theorem about the fundamental class in class field theory
- Shafarevich's theorem on elliptic curves with good reduction outside a given set.
