= Beppo Levi =

Italian mathematician (1875–1961)

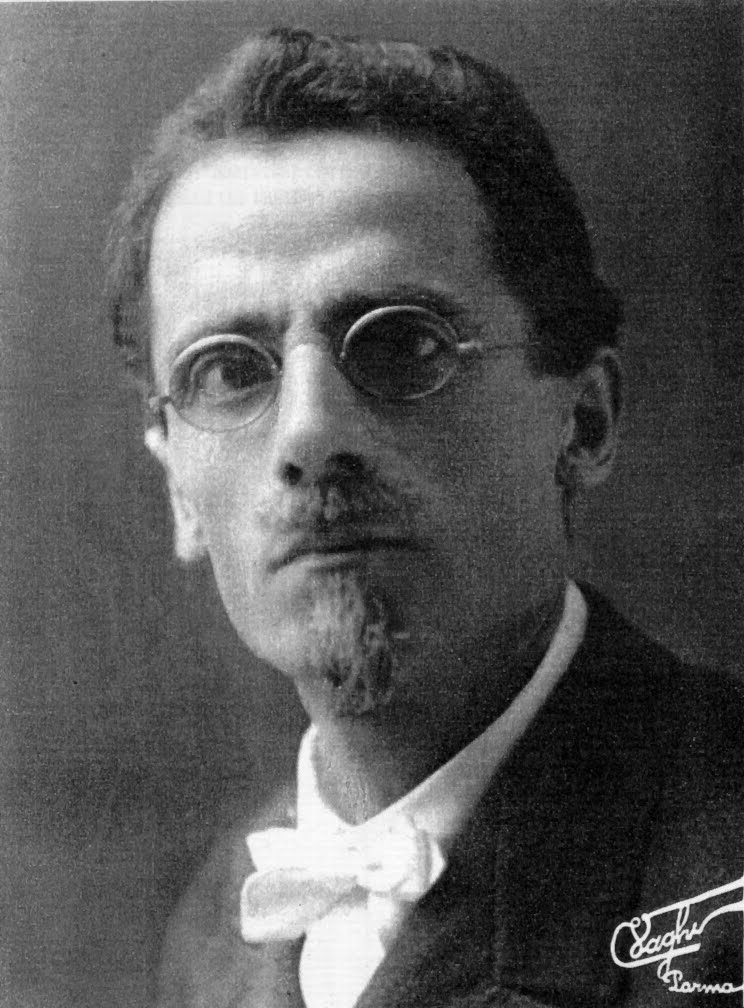
- Born: May 14, 1875; Turin, Italy
- Died: August 28, 1961 (aged 86); Rosario, Argentina
- Education: University of Turin
- Known for: Beppo Levi's lemma; Beppo-Levi space; Resolution of singularities; Torsion conjecture
- Awards: Feltrinelli Prize (1956); Member of the Bologna Academy of Sciences; Member of the Accademia dei Lincei
- Scientific career
- Fields: Algebraic geometry; Diophantine geometry; Lebesgue integration
- Workplaces: Universidad Nacional de Rosario; University of Bologna; University of Parma; University of Cagliari; Università Cattolica del Sacro Cuore; University of Turin
- Doctoral advisor: Corrado Segre

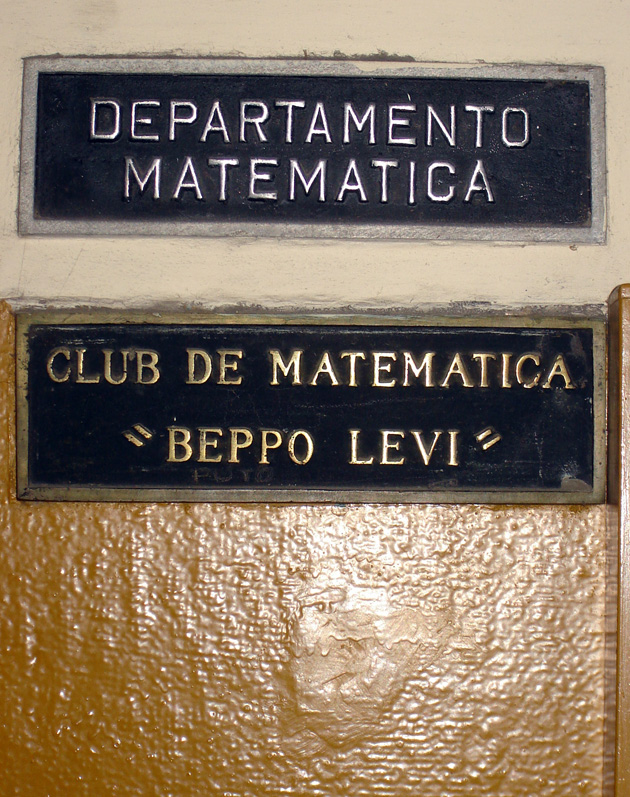
Dedication at the Instituto Politécnico Superior in Rosario, Argentina

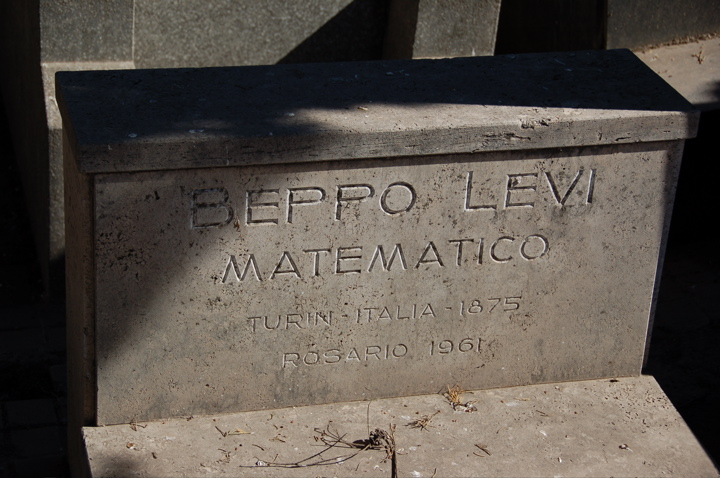
Tombstone, Rosario's Jewish Cemetery

Beppo Levi (14 May 1875 – 28 August 1961) was an Italian-Argentine mathematician. He published high-level academic articles and books on mathematics as well as on physics, history, philosophy, and pedagogy. Levi was a member of the Bologna Academy of Sciences and of the Accademia dei Lincei.

== Early years ==
Beppo Levi was born on May 14, 1875, in Turin, Italy to a Jewish family. He was an older brother of Eugenio Elia Levi. Levi obtained his laurea in mathematics in 1896 at age 21 from the University of Turin under Corrado Segre. He was appointed an assistant professor at the University of Turin three months later and shortly thereafter became a full-time Scholar. Levi was appointed Professor at the University of Piacenza in 1901, at the University of Cagliari in 1906, at the University of Parma in 1910, and finally at the University of Bologna in 1928. The years that followed his last appointment saw the rise of Benito Mussolini's power and of antisemitism in Italy, and Levi, being Jewish, was soon expelled from his position at the University of Bologna. He emigrated to Argentina, as did many other European Jews at that time.

== Life in Argentina ==
Levi chose Argentina as a destination because of an invitation by the engineer Cortés Plá, dean of the Facultad de Ciencias Matemáticas, Físico-Químicas y Naturales Aplicadas a la Industria at the Universidad Nacional del Litoral (currently Facultad de Ciencias Exactas, Ingeniería y Agrimensura at the Universidad Nacional de Rosario) in the city of Rosario. Cortés Plá invited Levi to come to Rosario to head the recently created Instituto de Matemática. It was there that Levi did most of his work from 1939 until his death in 1961.

While living in Rosario, Levi joined a group of mathematicians that included Luis Santaló, Simón Rubinstein, Juan Olguín, Enrique Ferrari, Fernando and Enrique Gaspar, Mario Castagnino and Edmundo Rofman. In 1940 Levi founded Mathematicae Notae, the first mathematical journal in Argentina. In 1956 he was awarded the Feltrinelli Prize.

He died on August 28, 1961, in Rosario, Argentina, and was buried in the Jewish cemetery there.

== Mathematical contributions ==
His early work studied singularities on algebraic curves and surfaces. In particular, he supplied a proof (questioned by some) that a procedure for resolution of singularities on algebraic surfaces terminates in finitely many steps. Later he proved some foundational results concerning Lebesgue integration, including what is commonly known as Beppo Levi's lemma.

He also studied the arithmetic of elliptic curves. He classified them up to isomorphism, not only over C, but also over Q. Next he studied what in modern terminology would be the subgroup of rational torsion points on an elliptic curve over Q: he proved that certain groups were realizable and that others were not. He essentially formulated the torsion conjecture for elliptic curves over the rational numbers, providing a complete list of possibilities should be, which was formulated independently by Andrew Ogg about 60 years later and finally proved by Barry Mazur in 1973.
