= Serge Cantat =

French mathematician (born 1973)

Serge Marc Cantat (born 3 June 1973, in Paris) is a French mathematician, specializing in geometry and dynamical systems.

Cantat received his PhD under the supervision of Étienne Ghys in 1999 at the École normale supérieure de Lyon. Cantat is a directeur de recherche of CNRS at the Institut de recherches mathématiques de Rennes (University of Rennes 1). He was previously directeur de recherche of CNRS at ENS Paris.

His research deals with complex dynamics and dynamics of automorphisms of algebraic surfaces. He examined the algebraic structure of Cremona groups (i.e. groups of birational automorphisms of $n$-dimensional projective spaces over a field $k$) and showed with Stéphane Lamy that for an algebraically closed field $k$ and for dimension $n=2$ the Cremona group $\mathrm{Cr}(\mathbb{P}^n(k))$ is not a simple group. In particular, if $k$ is the field of complex numbers and $n=2$, the Cremona group contains an infinite non-countable family of different normal subgroups.

In 2018, Cantat was an invited speaker at the International Congress of Mathematicians in Rio de Janeiro. In 2012 he received the Prix Paul Doistau–Émile Blutet for his work on dynamic systems (and especially holomorphic dynamic systems). In 2012 he was an invited speaker at the European Congress of Mathematics in Kraków. In 2012 he was awarded the Prix La Recherche. In 2025, he received the CNRS Silver Medal.

== Selected publications ==
- Dynamique des automorphismes des surfaces K3, Acta Mathematica, vol. 187, 2001, pp. 1–57. doi:10.1007/BF02392831
- with Charles Favre: Symétries birationnelles des surfaces feuilletées, Journal für die reine und angewandte Mathematik, vol. 561, 2003, pp. 199–235, arXiv:math/0206209
- Endomorphismes des variétés homogènes, L'Enseignement mathématique, vol. 49, 2004, pp. 237–262
- Difféomorphismes holomorphes Anosov, Commentarii Mathematici Helvetici, vol. 79, 2004, pp. 779–797 doi:10.1007/s00014-004-0811-3
- with Frank Loray: Holomorphic dynamics, Painlevé VI equation, and character varieties, Annales de l'Institut Fourier, vol. 59, 2009, pp. 2927–2978, arXiv:0711.1579
- Bers and Hénon, Painlevé and Schroedinger, Duke Mathematical Journal, vol. 149, 2009, pp. 411–460, arXiv:0711.1727
- with Antoine Chambert-Loir, Vincent Guedj: Quelques aspects des systèmes dynamiques polynomiaux, Panoramas et Synthèses, Volume 30, Société mathématique de France, 2010
  - In Cantat's introduction, the chapter Quelques aspects des systèmes dynamiques polynomiaux, existence, exemples, rigidité , pp. 13–96, with Chambert-Loir: Dynamique p-adique (d'après les exposés de Jean-Christophe Yoccoz) , p. 295 arXiv:0912.5413
- with Abdelghani Zeghib: Holomorphic Actions, Kummer Examples, and Zimmer Program, Annales Scientifiques de l'École Normale Supérieure, vol. 45, 2012, pp. 447–489, arXiv:1011.4768
- Sur les groupes de transformations birationnelles des surfaces, Annals of Mathematics, vol. 174, 2012, pp. 299–334 JSTOR 23030565
- with Igor Dolgachev: Rational Surfaces with a Large Group of Automorphisms, Journal of the American Mathematical Society, Vol. 25, 2012, pp. 863–905. arXiv:1106.0930
- Dynamics of automorphisms of compact complex surfaces, in: Frontiers in Complex Dynamics: In celebration of John Milnor's 80th birthday, Princeton Mathematical Series, Princeton University Press, 2012, pp. 463–514
- with Stéphane Lamy: Normal subgroups of the Cremona group, Acta Mathematica, vol. 210, 2013, pp. 31–94, arXiv:1007.0895
