= Cremona group =

Group in birational geometry

In birational geometry, the Cremona group, named after Luigi Cremona, is the group of birational automorphisms of the $n$-dimensional projective space over a field $k$, also known as Cremona transformations. It is denoted by $Cr(\mathbb{P}^n(k))$, $Bir(\mathbb{P}^n(k))$ or $Cr_n(k)$.

== Historical origins ==
The Cremona group was introduced by the Italian mathematician Luigi Cremona (1863, 1865). In retrospect, the British mathematician Isaac Newton is considered a founder of "the theory of Cremona transformations", having developed his "organic construction" to perform birational maps of the projective plane and applied them to resolve curve singularities, nearly two centuries before Cremona. The mathematician Hilda Phoebe Hudson made contributions in the 1900s as well.

== Basic properties ==
The Cremona group is naturally identified with the automorphism group $\mathrm{Aut}_k(k(x_1, ..., x_n))$ of the field of the rational functions in $n$ indeterminates over $k$. Here, the field $k(x_1, ..., x_n)$ is a pure transcendental extension of $k$, with transcendence degree $n$.

The projective general linear group $\mathrm{PGL}_{n+1}$ is contained in $Cr_n$. The two are equal only when $n=0$ or $n=1$, in which case both the numerator and the denominator of a transformation must be linear.

A longlasting question from Federigo Enriques concerns the simplicity of the Cremona group. It has been now mostly answered.

== The Cremona group in 2 dimensions ==
In two dimensions, Max Noether and Guido Castelnuovo showed that the complex Cremona group is generated by the standard quadratic transformation $[x:y:z]\mapsto [yz:zx:xy]$, along with $\mathrm{PGL}(3,k)$, though there was some controversy about whether their proofs were correct. Gizatullin (1983) gave a complete set of relations for these generators. The structure of this group is still not well understood, though there has been a lot of work on finding elements or subgroups of it.

- Cantat & Lamy (2010) showed that for an algebraically closed field $k$, the group $Cr_2(k)$ is not simple.
- Blanc (2010) showed that it is topologically simple for the Zariski topology. (Note: I.e. it does not contain any non-trivial closed normal strict subgroup.)
- For the finite subgroups of the Cremona group see Dolgachev & Iskovskikh (2009).
- Zimmermann (2018) computed the abelianization of $Cr_2(\mathbb{R})$. From this, she deduces that there is no analogue of Noether–Castelnuovo theorem in this context.

== Geiser and Bertini involutions ==
The Geiser involution and Bertini involution are two of the classical non-linear involutions of the plane Cremona group. They arise from Del Pezzo surfaces of degree 2 and degree 1, respectively.

A Geiser involution is obtained by blowing up seven points of $\mathbb{P}^2$ in general position, producing a Del Pezzo surface $S$ of degree 2. The anticanonical linear system $|-K_S|$ defines a double cover $S\to \mathbb{P}^2$ branched over a smooth plane quartic, and the deck transformation is the Geiser involution. Via the blow-down $S\to \mathbb{P}^2$, this becomes a birational involution of the plane. Classically, if $p_1,\dots,p_7$ are the seven base points, then a general point $x$ is sent to the ninth base point of the pencil of cubic curves through $p_1,\dots,p_7,x$. The resulting Cremona transformation has degree 8.

Similarly, blowing up eight points of $\mathbb{P}^2$ in general position produces a Del Pezzo surface of degree 1. The linear system $|-2K_S|$ defines a double cover of a quadric cone in $\mathbb{P}^3$, and its deck transformation is the Bertini involution. In classical plane terms, if $p_1,\dots,p_8$ are the base points, then for a general point $x$ one considers the net of sextics through $p_1,\dots,p_8,x$ that are singular at $p_1,\dots,p_8$; the Bertini involution sends $x$ to the fixed point of this net. Its degree is 17.

Over an algebraically closed field of characteristic different from 2, Bayle and Beauville's modern proof of the classical theorem on birational involutions of the plane shows that every non-trivial involution in $\mathrm{Bir}(\mathbb{P}^2)$ is conjugate to exactly one of three types: a de Jonquières involution, a Geiser involution, or a Bertini involution. The normalized fixed curve of a Geiser involution is a non-hyperelliptic curve of genus 3, while that of a Bertini involution is a non-hyperelliptic curve of genus 4 whose canonical model lies on a singular quadric. Consequently, conjugacy classes of Geiser involutions are parametrized by isomorphism classes of non-hyperelliptic genus-3 curves, and conjugacy classes of Bertini involutions by isomorphism classes of non-hyperelliptic genus-4 curves whose canonical model lies on a singular quadric.

== The Cremona group in higher dimensions ==
There is little known about the structure of the Cremona group in three dimensions and higher though many elements of it have been described.

There is no easy analogue of the Noether–Castelnouvo theorem, as Hudson (1927) showed that the Cremona group in dimension at least 3 is not generated by its elements of degree bounded by any fixed integer.

Blanc (2010) showed that it is (linearly) connected, answering a question of Serre (2010). Later, Blanc & Zimmermann (2018) showed that for any infinite field $k$, the group $Cr_n(k)$ is topologically simple for the Zariski topology, and even for the euclidean topology when $k$ is a local field.

Blanc, Lamy & Zimmermann (2021) proved that when $k$ is a subfield of the complex numbers and $n\geq 3$, then $Cr_n(k)$ is not a simple group.

== De Jonquières groups ==
A De Jonquières group is a subgroup of a Cremona group of the following form. Pick a transcendence basis $x_1, ..., x_n$ for a field extension of $k$. Then a De Jonquières group is the subgroup of automorphisms of $k(x_1, ...,x_n)$ mapping the subfield $k(x_1, ...,x_r)$ into itself for some $r\leq n$. It has a normal subgroup given by the Cremona group of automorphisms of $k(x_1, ..., x_n)$ over the field $k(x_1, ..., x_r)$, and the quotient group is the Cremona group of $k(x_1, ..., x_r)$ over the field $k$. It can also be regarded as the group of birational automorphisms of the fiber bundle $\mathbb{P}^r\times \mathbb{P}^{n-r} \to \mathbb{P}^r$.

When $n=2$ and $r=1$ the De Jonquières group is the group of Cremona transformations fixing a pencil of lines through a given point, and is the semidirect product of $\mathrm{PGL}_2(k)$ and $\mathrm{PGL}_2(k(t))$.

== See also ==
=== Bibliography ===
- Alberich-Carramiñana, Maria (2002), Geometry of the Plane Cremona Maps, Lecture Notes in Mathematics, vol. 1769, Berlin, New York: Springer-Verlag, doi:10.1007/b82933, ISBN 978-3-540-42816-9, MR 1874328
- Blanc, Jérémy (2010), "Groupes de Cremona, connexité et simplicité", Annales Scientifiques de l'École Normale Supérieure, Série 4, 43 (2): 357–364, arXiv:0903.2489, doi:10.24033/asens.2123, ISSN 0012-9593, MR 2662668
- Blanc, Jérémy; Zimmermann, Susanna (2018). "Topological simplicity of the Cremona groups". American Journal of Mathematics. 140 (5): 1297–1309. arXiv:1511.08907. doi:10.1353/ajm.2018.0032. ISSN 1080-6377.
- Blanc, Jérémy; Lamy, Stéphane; Zimmermann, Susanna (2021). "Quotients of higher-dimensional Cremona groups". Acta Mathematica. 226 (2): 211–318. arXiv:1901.04145. doi:10.4310/acta.2021.v226.n2.a1. ISSN 0001-5962.
- Cantat, Serge; Lamy, Stéphane (2010). "Normal subgroups in the Cremona group". Acta Mathematica. 210 (2013): 31–94. arXiv:1007.0895. Bibcode:2010arXiv1007.0895C. doi:10.1007/s11511-013-0090-1. S2CID 55261367.
- Cantat, Serge (2018), "The Cremona group", Algebraic Geometry: Salt Lake City 2015, Proceedings of Symposia in Pure Mathematics, vol. 97, part 1, American Mathematical Society, pp. 101–142
- Coolidge, Julian Lowell (1931), A treatise on algebraic plane curves, Oxford University Press, ISBN 978-0-486-49576-7, MR 0120551
- Cremona, L. (1863), "Sulle trasformazioni geometriche delle figure piane (nota 1)", Giornale di Matematiche di Battaglini, 1: 305–311
- Cremona, L. (1865), "Sulle trasformazioni geometriche delle figure piane (nota 2)", Giornale di Matematiche di Battaglini, 3: 269–280, 363–376
- Demazure, Michel (1970), "Sous-groupes algébriques de rang maximum du groupe de Cremona", Annales Scientifiques de l'École Normale Supérieure, Série 4, 3 (4): 507–588, doi:10.24033/asens.1201, ISSN 0012-9593, MR 0284446
- Dolgachev, Igor V. (2012), Classical Algebraic Geometry: a modern view (PDF), Cambridge University Press, ISBN 978-1-107-01765-8, archived from the original (PDF) on 2012-03-11
- Dolgachev, Igor V.; Iskovskikh, Vasily A. (2009), "Finite subgroups of the plane Cremona group", Algebra, arithmetic, and geometry: in honor of Yu. I. Manin. Vol. I, Progr. Math., vol. 269, Boston, MA: Birkhäuser Boston, pp. 443–548, arXiv:math/0610595, doi:10.1007/978-0-8176-4745-2_11, ISBN 978-0-8176-4744-5, MR 2641179, S2CID 2188718
- Gizatullin, M. Kh. (1983), "Defining relations for the Cremona group of the plane", Mathematics of the USSR-Izvestiya, 21 (2): 211–268, Bibcode:1983IzMat..21..211G, doi:10.1070/IM1983v021n02ABEH001789, ISSN 0373-2436, MR 0675525
- Godeaux, Lucien (1927), Les transformations birationelles du plan, Mémorial des sciences mathématiques, vol. 22, Gauthier-Villars et Cie, JFM 53.0595.02
- "Cremona group", Encyclopedia of Mathematics, EMS Press, 2001 [1994]
- "Cremona transformation", Encyclopedia of Mathematics, EMS Press, 2001 [1994]
- Hudson, Hilda Phoebe (1927), Cremona transformations in plane and space, Cambridge University Press; reprinted 2012, ISBN 978-0-521-35882-8
- Semple, J. G.; Roth, L. (1985), Introduction to algebraic geometry, Oxford Science Publications, The Clarendon Press Oxford University Press, ISBN 978-0-19-853363-4, MR 0814690
- Serre, Jean-Pierre (2009), "A Minkowski-style bound for the orders of the finite subgroups of the Cremona group of rank 2 over an arbitrary field", Moscow Mathematical Journal, 9 (1): 193–208, arXiv:0903.0514, doi:10.17323/1609-4514-2009-9-1-183-198, ISSN 1609-3321, MR 2567402, S2CID 13589478
- Serre, Jean-Pierre (2010), "Le groupe de Cremona et ses sous-groupes finis" (PDF), Astérisque, Seminaire Bourbaki 1000, pp. 75–100, ISBN 978-2-85629-291-4, ISSN 0303-1179, MR 2648675
- Zimmermann, Susanna (2018-02-01). "The Abelianization of the real Cremona group". Duke Mathematical Journal. 167 (2). arXiv:1510.08705. doi:10.1215/00127094-2017-0028. ISSN 0012-7094.
