= Evgeny Golod =

Russian mathematician

Evgenii Solomonovich Golod (Russian: Евгений Соломонович Голод, 21 October 1935 – 5 July 2018) was a Russian mathematician who proved the Golod–Shafarevich theorem on class field towers. As an application, he gave a negative solution to the Kurosh–Levitzky problem on the nilpotency of finitely generated nil algebras, and so to a weak form of Burnside's problem.

Golod was a student of Igor Shafarevich. As of 2015, Golod had 39 academic descendants, most of them through his student Luchezar L. Avramov.

== Selected publications ==
- Golod, E.S; Shafarevich, I.R. (1964), "On the class field tower", Izv. Akad. Nauk SSSSR (in Russian), 28: 261–272, MR 0161852
- Golod, E.S (1964), "On nil-algebras and finitely approximable p-groups.", Izv. Akad. Nauk SSSSR (in Russian), 28: 273–276, MR 0161878
