= Ogg's formula =

Ogg's formula is either of two things named after Andrew Ogg:

- Ogg's formula for the conductor of an elliptic curve
- The Grothendieck–Ogg–Shafarevich formula for the Euler characteristic of a curve
