= Adolf Schmidt (geophysicist) =

German geophysicist (1860–1944)

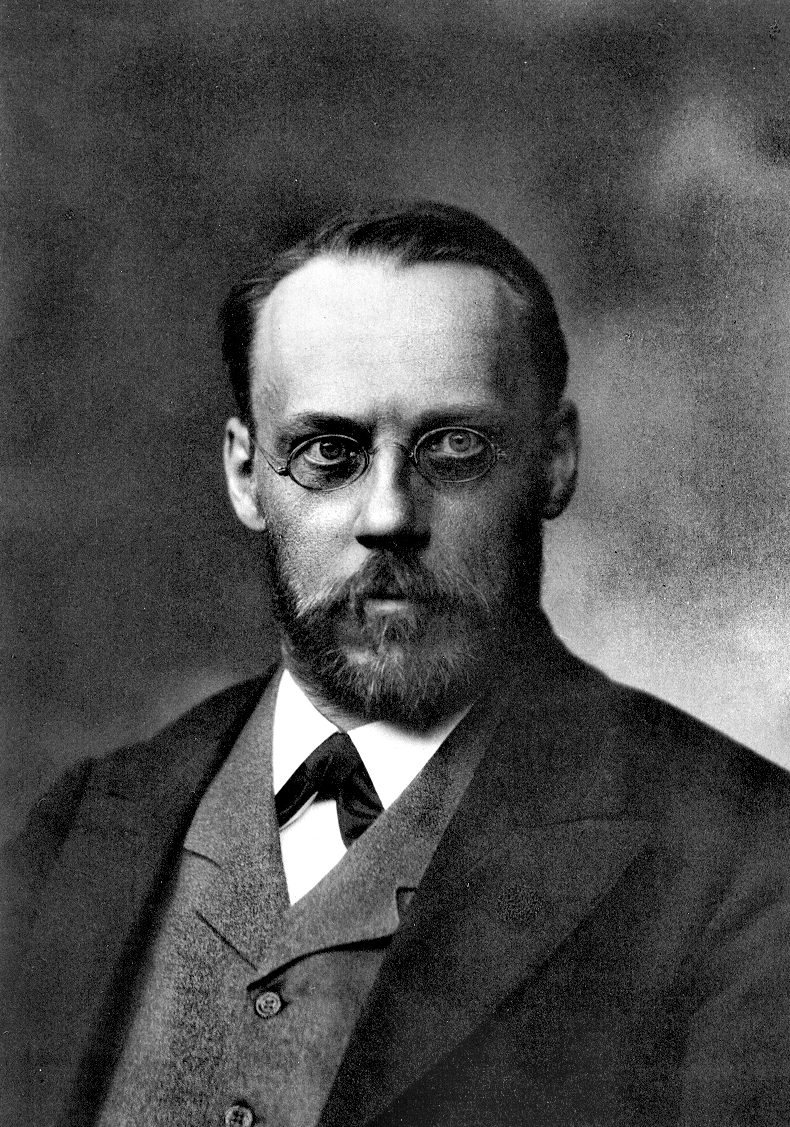

Adolf Friedrich Karl Schmidt (July 23, 1860 – October 17, 1944) was a German geophysicist who examined geomagnetism. He was involved in both experimental studies and in theoretical work on geomagnetism. He also designed a magnetometer which goes by his name. He was a member of the International Commission for Terrestrial Magnetism and Atmospheric Electricity from 1898.

== Life and work ==
Schmidt was born in Breslau to engineer Friedrich and Mathilde Eckstein. He studied mathematics physics and English in Breslau and received a doctorate in 1882 with a thesis on Cremona transformations especially those of the fourth order. In 1882–83, he worked at the Breslau Observatory, taking magnetic measurements for the International Polar Year. He would again attended the International Polar Year Commission meeting for 1932–33 in Copenhagen. He began to teach at the Gymnasium Ernestinum at Gotha until 1902 when he moved to the Potsdam Magnetic Observatory to replace the position held by the late Max Eschenhagen. From 1907, he was chair of meteorology at Berlin University. His first major contribution was on a mathematical methods for tracing magnetic potentials that took into account the shape of the Earth. He introduced ordinary harmonic analysis in 1894 and spherical harmonic analysis later. He also introduced statistical improvements to measurement and designed and improved several instruments. One of his inventions was to make recording of magnetic variation more economical and prevent the instruments from running out of recording paper during intense storms. Schmidt's design of the magnetic field-balances for separating vertical and horizontal components became a standard. He began an "Archiv des Erdmagnetismus” in 1903 at Gotha which kept systematic results of geomagnetic observations. In this Archiv he quoted Kant to answer the question on why he undertook the work when he could have spent his time on more attractive studies - "To make projects is often a luxurious, boastful occupation, whereby one gets the appearance of a creative genius by demanding what one cannot achieve oneself, criticising what one cannot do better, and proposing what one does not know oneself where it may be found." He tried to make his papers more accessible and was even a promoter of Esperanto for the cause. From 1917, his eyesight began to decline and he became nearly blind in 1922.
