= Étienne Ghys =

French mathematician

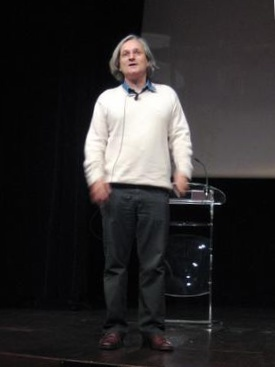
Étienne Ghys, 2007

Étienne Ghys (born 29 December 1954) is a French mathematician. His research focuses mainly on geometry and dynamical systems, though his mathematical interests are broad. He also expresses much interest in the historical development of mathematical ideas, especially the contributions of Henri Poincaré.

Alumnus of the École normale supérieure de Saint-Cloud, Ghys obtained his PhD in 1979 from the University of Lille with thesis Sur les actions localement libres du groupe affine (English: On the locally free actions of the affine group) written under the direction of Gilbert Hector.

He is currently a CNRS directeur de recherche at the École normale supérieure in Lyon. He is also editor-in-chief of the Publications Mathématiques de l'IHÉS and a member of the French Academy of Sciences.

Ghys was an invited speaker at the International Congress of Mathematicians (ICM) in Kyoto in 1990, and a plenary speaker at the ICM in Madrid in 2006. In 2015, he was awarded the inaugural Clay Award for Dissemination of Mathematical Knowledge.

He co-authored the computer graphics mathematical movie Dimensions: A walk through mathematics!. His doctoral students include Serge Cantat.
