= Giuseppe Veronese =

Italian mathematician (1854–1917)

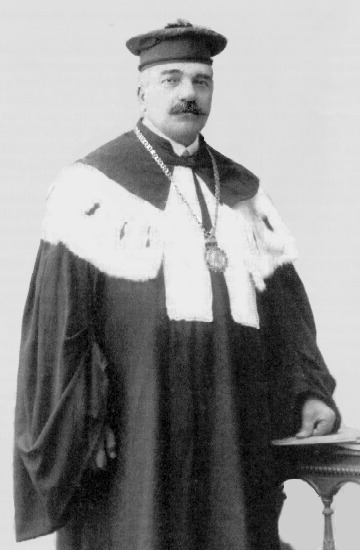
- Born: 7 May 1854; Chioggia
- Died: 17 July 1917 (aged 63); Padua
- Education: Istituto Tecnico di Venezia
- Scientific career
- Fields: Mathematics
- Workplaces: University of Padua
- Doctoral advisor: Luigi Cremona
- Doctoral students: Guido Castelnuovo

Giuseppe Veronese (7 May 1854 – 17 July 1917) was an Italian mathematician. He was born in Chioggia, near Venice.

== Education ==
Veronese earned his laurea in mathematics from the Istituto Tecnico di Venezia in 1872.

== Work ==
Although Veronese's work was severely criticised as unsound by Peano, he is now recognised as having priority on many ideas that have since become parts of transfinite numbers and model theory, and as one of the respected authorities of the time, his work served to focus Peano and others on the need for greater rigor.

He is particularly noted for his hypothesis of relative continuity which was the foundation for his development of the first non-Archimedean linear continuum.

Veronese produced several significant monographs. The most famous appeared in 1891, Fondamenti di geometria a più dimensioni e a più specie di unità rettilinee esposti in forma elementare, normally referred to as Fondamenti di geometria to distinguish it from Veronese' other works also styled Fondamenti. It was this work that was most severely criticised by both Peano and Cantor, however Levi-Civita described it as masterful and Hilbert as profound.

== See also ==
- Veronese surface
