= Blumenthal Award =

Award of the American Mathematical Society

The Blumenthal Award was founded by the American Mathematical Society in 1993 in memory of Leonard M. and Eleanor B. Blumenthal. The award was presented to the individual deemed to have made the most substantial contribution in research in the field of pure mathematics, and who was deemed to have the potential for future production of distinguished research in such field. It was awarded every four years for the most substantial Ph.D. thesis produced in the four year interval between awards. The fund that supported the award was discontinued and, thus, the award is no longer being made.

== Winners ==
- 1993 – Zhihong Xia
- 1997 – Loïc Merel
- 2001 – Stephen Bigelow and Elon Lindenstrauss
- 2005 – Manjul Bhargava
- 2009 – Maryam Mirzakhani

== See also ==
- List of mathematics awards
