= Castelnuovo curve =

Algebraic curve

In algebraic geometry, a Castelnuovo curve, studied by Castelnuovo (1889), is a curve in projective space P^{n} of maximal genus g among irreducible non-degenerate curves of given degree d.

Castelnuovo showed that the maximal genus is given by the Castelnuovo bound

$$g\le (n-1)m(m-1)/2+m\epsilon$$

where m and ε are the quotient and remainder when dividing d–1 by n–1. Castelnuovo described the curves satisfying this bound, showing in particular that they lie on either a rational normal scroll or on the Veronese surface.
