= Susanna Zimmermann =

Swiss mathematician

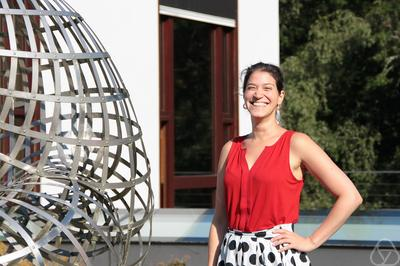
Zimmermann at Oberwolfach, 2018

Susanna Maria Zimmermann (born 1987) is a Swiss mathematician and a professor of mathematics at the University of Basel. Her research focuses on algebraic geometry, and especially Cremona groups in birational geometry.

== Education and career ==
Zimmermann is from Glarus Süd; she was born in 1987. In 2004–2005 she studied as Rotary Youth Exchange student in Mumbai. She describes herself after finishing high school as "interested in everything"; inspired by Simon Singh's book Fermat's Last Theorem, she chose mathematics for its difficulty, originally intending to work in finance. Changing direction after becoming interested in research through meeting other young researchers at her university, she defended her Ph.D. in 2016 at the University of Basel. Her dissertation, Compositions and relations in the Cremona groups, was supervised by Jérémy Blanc.

In 2016 and 2017 she was a postdoctoral researcher with Stéphane Lamy at Toulouse III - Paul Sabatier University in France, funded by the Swiss National Science Foundation. She remained in France as a maître de conférences (the French equivalent of an associate professor) at the University of Angers from 2017 to 2022, affiliated there with the Laboratoire Angevin de REcherche en MAthématiques (LAREMA), and completed a habilitation in 2021.

She took a full professorship in 2022 at Paris-Saclay University, in the Mathematical Institute of Orsay. In 2025 she took a leave from her position at Paris-Saclay University and returned to the University of Basel as a full professor.

She has also served as an ambassador for the Maison Poincaré, a mathematics museum in the Institut Henri Poincaré.

== Recognition ==
Zimmermann was a 2020 recipient of the CNRS Bronze Medal, and was named as a junior member of the Institut Universitaire de France in 2022. Her work with Jérémy Blanc and Stéphane Lamy on quotients of higher-dimensional Cremona groups received a 2024 Frontiers of Science Award at the International Congress of Basic Science in Beijing.

She is a speaker at the 2026 International Congress of Mathematicians.
