= Anna Maria Enriques Agnoletti =

Italian partisan

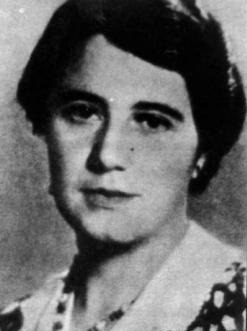
- Born: 1907; Bologna, Italy
- Died: 12 June 1944 (aged 37); Sesto Fiorentino, Italy
- Cause of death: Execution by firing squad
- Known for: Gold Medal of Military Valour
- Parent(s): Paolo Enriques; Maria Clotilde Agnoletti Fusconi

Anna Maria Enriques Agnoletti (1907 – 12 June 1944) was an Italian partisan, shot by the Nazis on 12 June 1944. For her actions in support of the Italian partisan movement she was honored post-mortem with the Gold Medal of Military Valour.

== Biography ==
Anna Maria Enriques Agnoletti was born in Bologna. Her father Paolo Enriques was Jewish of Portuguese descent; her mother Maria Clotilde Agnoletti Fusconi was Catholic. She was niece of mathematician Federigo Enriques. Neither of her parents were religiously observant, so Anna Maria and her brother Enzo received a lay education. Her father was an important biologist who taught at various universities. Because of his job, the family moved to various Italian cities; he was in Naples, Sassari and finally in Florence. Anna Maria attended the Liceo Classico Michelangelo in Florence.

In 1926 she began studying for her bachelor's degree in literature and philosophy.

In 1930 she obtained her degree. Her bachelor's thesis supervisor was Nicolaj Ottokar. This encounter was extremely important for her. Nicolaj had come from a Siberian University and during his stay in Russia, he had witnessed the events that led to the October Revolution in 1905. He taught in Florence for 30 years, beginning exactly in the year when Anna first enrolled.

In 1932, after her graduation, and having further studied paleography and archival research, Anna Maria got a temporary position at the university as joint assistant, working in the State Archive of Florence

In 1936 she was appointed head archivist, continuing her collaboration with the Historical Italian Archive, writing book reviews and conference reports.

Anna initiated the process of converting to Catholicism in 1936, completing it in 1938. It was the result of a spiritual quest that lasted for many years and would impact her life decisions until her death.

In 1938 the Italian Racial Laws were approved in Italy, resulting in an interruption of Anna's studies and carrier, since, despite her conversion, she was still considered a Jew.

Under the Racial Laws it was forbidden for Jews to serve in the Army, to be a guard, to be a company owner, to own land or any real estate, and to have "Aryans" living in the household. Jews were no longer allowed to work in military and civil administration, provincial and municipal bodies, banks and insurance, schools and universities, regardless of rank. Eventually, Jewish students were barred from State schools.

Anna was fired from the State Archive in a moment of economic instability for her family.

In those years the most important figure in Florentine Catholicism was Giorgio La Pira, Anna had a relationship of esteem and affection with him. In 1939, he founded a magazine called "Principi", whose purpose was to show "the abyss of war towards which we are running". This magazine was very important for Anna's intellectual formation.

Giorgio La Pira helped her to find a new job: he accompanied her brother Enzo to visit the Archbishop of Florence and thanks to him Anna was hired at the Vatican Library. Anna lived with the nuns, sharing the room with Tea Sesini; the two girls were colleagues at the Vatican Library, and also battle comrades. In 1940 Italy joined World War II. Turmoil brewed at the Vatican Library on account of the anti-fascist movement active there.

Anna befriended a priest through whom she met, amongst other intellectuals, Gerardo Bruni, who had studied philosophy at Rome's Sapienza University, and had been involved in the Italian Popular Party.

She and Bruni constituted the first nucleus of the Christian Social group, along with a few other friends. It would develop into a movement and finally a political party. In 1943 Anna Maria left her job in Rome and returned to Florence to be near her mother, who had been left alone. Here she began to take part in the Italian resistance movement, assisting Jewish families, providing them with identity paper. She often accompanied them to the City Council for the notarial acts. But on May 12, 1944, she was betrayed by a fascist informer, who awaited her at home, and arrested her along with her mother. Three days later, Anna was taken to Villa Triste.

Villa Triste is the given name of various torture places opened by Nazi-Fascists during the last years of World War II. Of particular, sinister note were the Villa Triste in Florence, Rome and Milan.

Villa Triste in Florence is still in Via Bolognese 67. The Germans granted the Fascists the use of the lower floors and basement of the block of flats, where Commander Mario Carità organized the Special Services Department, an institution where amnestied criminals of all kinds were welcomed.

At Villa Triste the convicted were interrogated while lying on a sort of fakir's bed. They were made to drink oil, and subjected to torture of various kinds, such as electric shocks on the genitals, or the forced swallowing of salt, without water. The torturers, who were constantly replaced, tended to be drunk on cognac or high on cocaine.

When the torture failed to convince the victims to speak, they were shot. Anna Maria was tortured too. For seven days, she was forced to stand for without being allowed to sit or sleep.

It seems that the participants in the sadistic sessions included even religious men, including a Benedictine monk, Father Ildefonso, who amused himself playing Neapolitan folk songs on the piano during the torture.

On 12 June Anna was taken by fascists to Cercina, a small location on the hills North of Florence, near Sesto Fiorentino, the only woman amongst the six young men of the Cora group of which she was a member. They were all shot there, their bodies then abandoned. Anna was 37. Florence was liberated shortly after.

Radio CORA (acronym of Commissioner Radio) was a clandestine broadcasting station, managed by the members of the Florentine Action Party, that, from January to June 1944, ensured a connection between the Italian resistance movement and the Allied commands. The creators of the initiative were a group of young people, including Enzo Enriques Agnoletti, and some twenty collaborators.

The activity of the clandestine radio, which transmitted information about German activity in Florence to the Allied commands and sent out calls for help for the partisans, was so important that on 2 June 1944 the allies airdropped some men in Prato to help the radio.

== Awards ==
Gold Medal for Valor (26 March 1833 – 10 May 1943)

After death, Anna Maria Enriques Agnoletti, was decorated with the Medaglia d'oro al Valor Militare (Gold Medal of Military Valor), accompanied by the following reason: -«Immemore dei propri dolori, ricordò solo quelli della Patria; e nei pericoli e nelle ansie della lotta clandestina ricercò senza tregua i fratelli da confortare con la tenerezza degli affetti e da fortificare con la fermezza di un eroico apostolato. Imprigionata dagli sgherri tedeschi per lunghi giorni, superò con la invitta forza dell'animo la furia dei suoi torturatori che non ottennero da quel giovane corpo straziato una sola parola rivelatrice. Tratta dopo un mese dal carcere delle Murate, il giorno 12 giugno 1944, sul greto del Mugnone, in mezzo ad un gruppo di patrioti, cadeva uccisa da una raffica di mitragliatrice: indimenticabile esempio di valore e di sacrificio.» — Firenze, 15 maggio – 12 giugno 1944.

Here is the translation:

-"Forgetful of their pain, she remembered only those of her country; and in the dangers and anxieties of the clandestine struggle she sought relentlessly the brothers to comfort with the tenderness of the affections and to fortify with the firmness of a heroic apostolate. Imprisoned by German Germans for long days, she overcame with the invincible strength of the soul the fury of his torturers who did not get from that young body a single revealing word. On June 12, 1944, a month after being taken out of the Murate Prison, in the Mugnone Greto, in the midst of a group of patriots, She was killed by a gunshot bomber: an unforgettable example of value and sacrifice. " – Florence, May 15 – June 12, 1944.

- In memory of the Partigiani, her name was given to the Second Level College of Science "A.M.E. Agnoletti" with headquarters in Sesto Fiorentino and Campi Bisenzio, and to the primary schools of Rimaggio-Padule in Bagno a Ripoli https://web.archive.org/web/20161031025801/http://www.icmattei.gov.it/primaria-rimaggio/ and Enriques-Capponi in Florence.

== Bibliography ==
- Bocci, Enrico; Lucia Tumiati Barbieri (1969). Enrico Bocci – Una vita per la libertà, Testimonianze... Firenze: Casa Editrice Barbèra.
- Carlo Francovich, Carlo (1962). La Resistenza a Firenze. Firenze: La Nuova Italia.
- La Rocca, Gilda (2004). La radio Cora di piazza d'Azelio e le altre due stazioni radio. Firenze: Editrice "La Giuntina".
- Onorati, Ugo (2010). Anna Maria Enriques Agnoletti partigiana nei Castelli Romani. Marino: Sezione ANPI "Aurelio del Gobbo" di Marino; Provincia di Roma; Associazione ONLUS "Senza Frontiere".
