= Andrew Ogg =

American mathematician

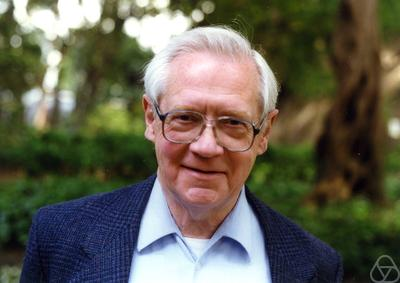
Andrew Ogg

Andrew Pollard Ogg (born April 9, 1934, Bowling Green, Ohio) is an American mathematician and professor emeritus of mathematics at the University of California, Berkeley. He is known for his contributions to number theory and algebraic geometry, including several foundational results on elliptic curves and modular curves. His 1975 observation connecting supersingular primes to the monster group is widely regarded as the earliest hint of monstrous moonshine.

== Education ==
Ogg completed his undergraduate work at Bowling Green State University in the mid-1950s. He received his Ph.D. in 1961 from Harvard University under the supervision of John Tate.

== Career ==
Ogg worked in algebra, number theory, and the arithmetic of elliptic curves and modular curves. His contributions include the Grothendieck–Ogg–Shafarevich formula, which describes the behavior of étale cohomology under ramification; Ogg's formula for the conductor of an elliptic curve; and the Néron–Ogg–Shafarevich criterion, which gives a condition for an elliptic curve to have good reduction at a prime. He posed the torsion conjecture in 1973, which predicted a uniform bound on the torsion points of elliptic curves over number fields. The conjecture was proved for the rationals by Barry Mazur in 1977 and in full generality by Loïc Merel in 1996. He is also the author of the book Modular forms and Dirichlet series (W. A. Benjamin, 1969).

== The Jack Daniel's Problem ==
In 1975, Ogg attended a lecture by Jacques Tits at the Collège de France in which the conjectural order of the monster group was presented. Ogg noticed that the prime factors of this order-2, 3, 5, 7, 11, 13, 17, 19, 23, 29, 31, 41, 47, 59, and 71-were precisely the primes p for which the normalizer Γ_{0}(p)^{+} of the Hecke congruence subgroup Γ_{0}(p) in SL(2,R) yields a Riemann surface of genus zero. In a subsequent paper, he offered a bottle of Jack Daniel's whiskey to anyone who could explain this coincidence. This observation is widely considered the earliest hint of monstrous moonshine, and the challenge of explaining it became known as the "Jack Daniel's Problem". These 15 primes are now known as the supersingular primes.

Although Richard Borcherds's 1992 proof of the monstrous moonshine conjecture, for which he received the Fields Medal in 1998, established a deep connection between the monster group and modular functions, it provides a route from the monster to the genus-zero property but not in the reverse direction, leaving Ogg's original question not fully resolved. In 2014, John Duncan and Ken Ono revisited the problem, showing that the moonshine functions for order p elements of the monster yield the set of characteristic p supersingular j-invariants (apart from 0 and 1728), and discussing the coincidence using the first principles of moonshine. As of 2026, the bottle of Jack Daniel's remains unclaimed.
