= Luchezar Avramov =

Bulgarian-American mathematician

- Born: Luchezar L. Avramov
- Education: Moscow State University
- Known for: Avramov-Martsinkovsky sequence
- Awards: American Mathematical Society Fellow (2012)
- Scientific career
- Fields: Mathematics
- Workplaces: Sofia University; Purdue University; University of Nebraska–Lincoln
- Thesis: On Homological Properties of Local Rings (1975)
- Doctoral advisor: Evgeny Golod

Luchezar L. Avramov (Bulgarian: Лъчезар Л. Аврамов) is a Bulgarian-American mathematician who works in commutative algebra. He held the Dale M. Jensen Chair in Mathematics at the University of Nebraska–Lincoln, and is now an Emeritus.

== Career ==
Avramov was educated at Moscow State University, earning a master's degree in 1970, a Ph.D. in 1975 (under the supervision of Evgeny Golod), and a D.Sc. in 1986. He worked for the Bulgarian Academy of Sciences in 1970–1981 and 1989–1990, and Sofia University in 1981–1989, before moving to the United States in 1991 to become a professor at Purdue University. He moved again to the University of Nebraska–Lincoln in 2002.

== Awards and honors ==
In 2012, he became a Fellow of the American Mathematical Society in its inaugural class.

== See also ==
- Coherent duality
- Ext functor
- Tor functor
