= Paolo Enriques =

Italian zoologist

Paolo Enriques (17 August 1878 in Livorno – 26 December 1932 in Rome) was an Italian zoologist of Portuguese-Jewish descent.

He was the brother of mathematician Federigo Enriques and the brother-in-law of another mathematician Guido Castelnuovo who married their sister Elbina. He married Maria Clotilde Agnoletti Fusconi and was the father of Anna Maria Enriques Agnoletti and Enzo Enriques Agnoletti. Enriques taught Zoology and Comparative Anatomy at the University of Sassari (1917 to 1921), then in 1922 he became Professor of Zoology in the University of Padua University, and Director of the Institute of Zoology and Comparative Anatomy. He was primarily interested in comparative cytology, physiology and genetics. He wrote "Teoria cellulare" or, in English Cellular Theory (1911), "Eredità dell'uomo" or Inheritance in Man (1924), and "Le leggi di Mendel e i cromosomi" or Mendel's Laws and Chromosomes (1932). He died in a car accident in Rome.

== See also ==
- Anna Maria Enriques Agnoletti (his daughter) was awarded a Gold Medal of Military Valour
