= Federigo Enriques =

Italian mathematician (1871–1946)

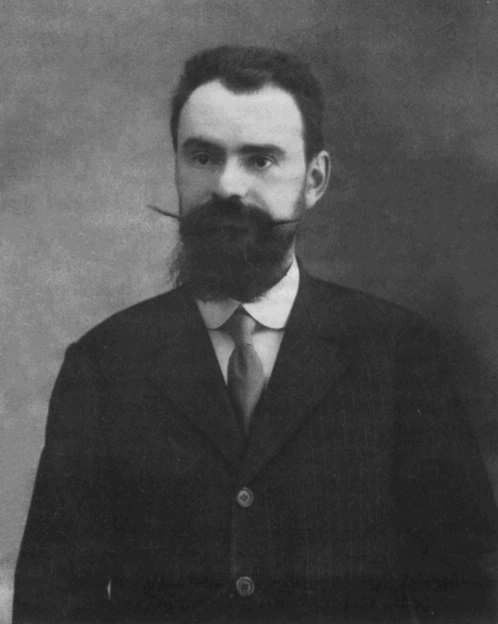
- Born: 5 January 1871; Livorno
- Died: 14 June 1946 (aged 75); Rome
- Education: Scuola Normale Superiore di Pisa
- Known for: Enriques surface Enriques–Babbage theorem Enriques–Kodaira classification
- Scientific career
- Fields: Mathematics
- Workplaces: University of Bologna; Sapienza University of Rome
- Doctoral advisor: Enrico Betti; Guido Castelnuovo

Abramo Giulio Umberto Federigo Enriques (5 January 1871 – 14 June 1946) was an Italian mathematician, now known principally as the first to give a classification of algebraic surfaces in birational geometry, and other contributions in algebraic geometry.

== Biography ==
Enriques was born in Livorno, and brought up in Pisa, in a Sephardi Jewish family of Portuguese descent. His younger brother was zoologist Paolo Enriques who was also the father of Enzo Enriques Agnoletti and Anna Maria Enriques Agnoletti. He became a student of Guido Castelnuovo (who later became his brother-in-law after marrying his sister Elbina), and became an important member of the Italian school of algebraic geometry. He also worked on differential geometry. He collaborated with Castelnuovo, Corrado Segre and Francesco Severi. He had positions at the University of Bologna, and then the University of Rome La Sapienza. In 1931, he swore allegiance to fascism, and in 1933 he became a member of the PNF. Despite this, he lost his position in 1938, when the Fascist government enacted the "leggi razziali" (racial laws), which in particular banned Jews from holding professorships in Universities.

The Enriques classification, of complex algebraic surfaces up to birational equivalence, was into five main classes, and was background to further work until Kunihiko Kodaira reconsidered the matter in the 1950s. The largest class, in some sense, was that of surfaces of general type: those for which the consideration of differential forms provides linear systems that are large enough to make all the geometry visible. The work of the Italian school had provided enough insight to recognise the other main birational classes. Rational surfaces and more generally ruled surfaces (these include quadrics and cubic surfaces in projective 3-space) have the simplest geometry. Quartic surfaces in 3-spaces are now classified (when non-singular) as cases of K3 surfaces; the classical approach was to look at the Kummer surfaces, which are singular at 16 points. Abelian surfaces give rise to Kummer surfaces as quotients. There remains the class of elliptic surfaces, which are fiber bundles over a curve with elliptic curves as fiber, having a finite number of modifications (so there is a bundle that is locally trivial actually over a curve less some points). The question of classification is to show that any surface, lying in projective space of any dimension, is in the birational sense (after blowing up and blowing down of some curves, that is) accounted for by the models already mentioned.

No more than other work in the Italian school would the proofs by Enriques now be counted as complete and rigorous. Not enough was known about some of the technical issues: the geometers worked by a mixture of inspired guesswork and close familiarity with examples. Oscar Zariski started to work in the 1930s on a more refined theory of birational mappings, incorporating commutative algebra methods. He also began work on the question of the classification for characteristic p, where new phenomena arise. The schools of Kunihiko Kodaira and Igor Shafarevich had put Enriques' work on a sound footing by about 1960.

== Works ==
- Enriques F. Lezioni di geometria descrittiva. Bologna, 1920.
- Enriques F. Lezioni di geometria proiettiva. Italian ed. 1898 and German ed. 1903.
- Enriques F. & Chisini, O. Lezioni sulla teoria geometrica delle equazioni e delle funzioni algebriche. Bologna, 1915–1934. Volume 1, Volume 2, Vol. 3, 1924; Vol. 4, 1934.
- Severi F. Lezioni di geometria algebrica : geometria sopra una curva, superficie di Riemann-integrali abeliani. Italian ed. 1908.
- Enriques F. Problems of Science (trans. Problemi di Scienza). Chicago, 1914.
- Enriques F. Zur Geschichte der Logik. Leipzig, 1927.
- Castelnouvo G., Enriques F. Die algebraischen Flaechen// Encyklopädie der mathematischen Wissenschaften, III C 6
- Enriques F. Le superficie algebriche. Bologna, 1949.

=== Articles ===
On Scientia.

- (in Italian) Eredità ed evoluzione
- (in Italian) I numeri e l'infinito
- (in Italian) Il pragmatismo
- (in Italian) Il principio di ragion sufficiente nel pensiero greco
- (in Italian) Il problema della realtà
- (in Italian) Il significato della critica dei principii nello sviluppo delle matematiche
- (in Italian) Importanza della storia del pensiero scientifico nella cultura nazionale
- (in French) L'infini dans la pensee des grecs
- (in Italian) L'infinito nella storia del pensiero
- (in French) L'oeuvre mathematique de Klein
- (in French) La connaissance historique et la connaissance scientifique dans la critique de Enrico De Michelis
- (in Italian) La filosofia positiva e la classificazione delle scienze
- (in Italian) I motivi della filosofia di Eugenio Rignano
