= Antisemitism in Soviet mathematics =

Jews studying or working in the field of mathematics in the Soviet Union faced hostility, prejudice and discrimination. Numerous testimonies from the second half of the 1960s to the late 1980s say that Jewish mathematicians were discriminated against when entering universities, postgraduate studies and work; defending their dissertations; trying to publish articles or books; and traveling to scientific conferences and abroad.

Academics Ivan Vinogradov, Lev Pontryagin and a number of others, who for a long time led and determined policy in Soviet mathematics, were accused by contemporaries of carrying out antisemitic policies. This has caused several international scandals. Pontryagin himself denied these accusations.

Discrimination was often described as one of the reasons for the mass emigration of Jewish mathematicians from the USSR.

== Background ==
Antisemitism in the USSR was a continuation of antisemitism in the Russian Empire. Since 1887, the Russian Empire had a Jewish quota for students ranging from 3% in Moscow and Saint Petersburg and up to 10% in the Pale of Settlement region. Some educational institutions were generally closed to Jews. Jews were allowed to lecture at universities as a rare exception; it was almost impossible for a Jew to make a scientific career in Russia.

At the state level, antisemitism emerged in the Soviet Union in the late 1930s and peaked in the late 1940s and early 1950s. During this period, two major openly anti-Jewish trials took place — the case of the Night of the Murdered Poets and the "doctors' plot". In 1944, restrictions were imposed on the admission of Jews to universities. During the anti-cosmopolitan campaign, Jewish students were expelled from universities, and scientists and teachers were fired from their jobs.

After the 1967 Arab-Israeli Six-Day War, anti-Zionist propaganda sharply intensified in the USSR, sometimes turning into prejudice towards Jews. On 9 March 1968, 99 mathematicians signed a letter against the illegal forced sending of dissident Alexander Esenin-Volpin to a psychiatric hospital. After that, many who signed the letter were subjected to repression: they were kicked out of their jobs, demoted, prohibited from traveling abroad, while others were pressured into refusing to sign the letter.

== Discrimination in education ==
Historian Semyon Charny, an employee of the Memorial human rights research centre, says that discrimination was originally inherent in the Soviet education system, but was based on class. A discriminatory system based on ethnicity in order to prevent Jews from entering certain universities emerged in the late 1940s. The Shorter Jewish Encyclopedia says that during this period "many faculties of Moscow, Leningrad, Kiev and other universities, the Moscow Engineering Physics Institute, the Moscow Physics and Technology Institute were completely or partially closed to Jews. Many academic institutions stopped hiring Jews." Lyudmila Alexeyeva, a human rights activist and member of the Moscow Helsinki Group, noted that "constraint in access to education is the most sensitive of the discriminatory measures against Jews, since the desire to educate children is one of the best preserved traditions in Jewish families."

One major element of discrimination was the large-scale denial of admission to the MSU Faculty of Mechanics and Mathematics for applicants of Jewish origin. A similar system operated at the Bauman Moscow State Technical University and some other prestigious universities.

The Faculty of Mechanics and Mathematics of Moscow State University admitted significantly fewer Jews in 1978 than under the conditions of the Jewish quota of the Russian Empire. That year, 21 graduates of one of the Moscow mathematical schools entered the faculty, including 14 Russians and seven Jews. All 14 Russians were accepted. Out of the seven Jews, only one was accepted (he received the 1st prize at the International Mathematical Olympiad and for three years in a row, received the 1st prize at the All-Union Olympiads). Among the rejected Jews, two were multiple winners of the Moscow Olympiad.

Mathematician and dissident Valery Senderov spoke about the methods by which the administration of the Mechanics and Mathematics Department did not allow Jewish applicants to enter the university. Jewish applicants were asked to solve the most complex mathematical problems of the All-Union and international mathematical Olympiads as problems for entrance exams, which was directly prohibited by the instructions of the USSR Ministry of Higher Education. Special problems were also designed, which technically had a solution within the limits of the school curriculum, but it was impossible to solve them in a reasonable time. In the oral examinations, questions were asked that went far beyond the scope of the school curriculum. Sometimes during oral examinations, Jewish applicants were gathered into separate groups, and the auditoriums where they took the exams were called "gas chambers" (Russian: газовые камеры). According to Mikhail Shifman, professor at the Institute of Theoretical Physics at the University of Minnesota, "only those Jewish applicants who, for special reasons, were not included in these groups, for example, the children of professors, academicians or other 'necessary' people, could enroll" in the Faculty of Mechanics and Mathematics at Moscow State University.

Academician Igor Shafarevich, speaking about the representation of different nationalities in prestigious areas, wrote about these exams:

On the other hand, it must be said by what means these problems were solved until recently - for example, in mathematics. Of course, I must say about them - they were monstrous. During the exams there was a struggle, a war with teenagers, almost children. They were asked meaningless or ambiguous questions that were confusing. This had a destructive effect on their psychology, on the psychology of them and other adolescents, who saw that applicants for exams were divided into groups. When they saw, for example, that from one audience they come out with solid twos, and another group with fours and fives. A class of such examiners was created. These people, of course, would be ready for other similar actions.

Academician Andrei Sakharov also commented on this discrimination. He wrote that similar methods were used not only against Jewish applicants, but also against the children of dissidents.

The problems themselves, offered to Jewish applicants for entrance exams at the Faculty of Mechanics and Mathematics of Moscow State University, gained fame and became the subject of discussion in the international scientific community.

== See also ==
- Deutsche Mathematik and Deutsche Physik – similar movements in Nazi Germany
