= Torsion conjecture =

Conjecture in number theory

In algebraic geometry and number theory, the torsion conjecture or uniform boundedness conjecture for torsion points for abelian varieties states that the order of the torsion group of an abelian variety over a number field can be bounded in terms of the dimension of the variety and the number field. A stronger version of the conjecture is that the torsion is bounded in terms of the dimension of the variety and the degree of the number field. The torsion conjecture has been completely resolved in the case of elliptic curves.

== Elliptic curves ==
Ogg's conjecture
- Field: Number theory
- Conjectured by: Beppo Levi
- Conjectured in: 1908
- First proof by: Barry Mazur
- First proof in: 1977–1978

From 1906 to 1911, Beppo Levi published a series of papers investigating the possible finite orders of points on elliptic curves over the rationals. He showed that there are infinitely many elliptic curves over the rationals with the following torsion groups:

- C_{n} with 1 ≤ n ≤ 10, where C_{n} denotes the cyclic group of order n;
- C_{12};
- C_{2n} × C_{2} with 1 ≤ n ≤ 4, where × denotes the direct sum.

At the 1908 International Mathematical Congress in Rome, Levi conjectured that this is a complete list of torsion groups for elliptic curves over the rationals. The torsion conjecture for elliptic curves over the rationals was independently reformulated by Trygve Nagell (1952) and again by Andrew Ogg (1971), with the conjecture becoming commonly known as Ogg's conjecture.

Andrew Ogg (1971) drew the connection between the torsion conjecture for elliptic curves over the rationals and the theory of classical modular curves. In the early 1970s, the work of Gérard Ligozat, Daniel Kubert, Barry Mazur, and John Tate showed that several small values of n do not occur as orders of torsion points on elliptic curves over the rationals. Barry Mazur (1977, 1978) proved the full torsion conjecture for elliptic curves over the rationals. His techniques were generalized by Kamienny (1992) and Kamienny & Mazur (1995), who obtained uniform boundedness for quadratic fields and number fields of degree at most 8 respectively. Finally, Loïc Merel (1996) proved the conjecture for elliptic curves over any number field. He proved for K a number field of degree $d=[K:\mathbb{Q}]$ and an elliptic curve $E/K$ that there is a bound on the order of the torsion group depending only on the degree $|E(K)_{\text{tors}}|\leq B(d)$. Furthermore if $d > 1$ and $P\in E(K)_{\text{tors}}$ is a point of prime order $p$ we have $p\leq d^{3d^2}.$

An effective bound for the size of the torsion group in terms of the degree of the number field was given by Parent (1999). Parent proved that for $P\in E(K)_{\text{tors}}$ a point of prime power order $p^n$ we have
$$p^n \leq B(d,p)=\begin{cases}
129(3^d-1)(3d)^6&\text{if }p=2,\\
65(5^d-1)(2d)^6&\text{if }p=3,\\
65(3^d-1)(2d)^6&\text{if }p>3.
\end{cases}$$
Setting $B_{\text{max}}(d)=129(5^d-1)(3d)^6$ we get from the structure result behind the Mordell-Weil theorem, i.e. there are two integers $n_1,n_2$ such that $E(K)_{\text{tors}}\cong\mathbb{Z}/n_1\mathbb{Z}\times\mathbb{Z}/n_2\mathbb{Z}$, a coarse but effective bound $B(d)=\left(B_{\text{max}}(d)^{B_{\text{max}}(d)}\right)^2.$

Joseph Oesterlé gave in private notes from 1994 a slightly better bound for points of prime order $p$ of $p\leq (3^{d/2}+1)^2$, which turns out to be useful for computations over fields of small order, but alone is not enough to yield an effective bound for $|E(K)_{\text{tors}}|$. Derickx et al. (2023) provide a published version of Oesterlé's result.

For number fields of small degree more refined results are known (Sutherland 2012). Complete lists of possible torsion groups have been given for elliptic curves over number fields up to degree 4 (see above for the explicit complete list in degree 1, i.e. over $\mathbb{Q}$). In degree 1, 2 and 4 all groups that arise occur infinitely often. The same holds for cubic fields except for the group C_{21} which occurs only in a single elliptic curve over $K=\mathbb{Q}(\zeta_9)^+$. Additionally all torsion groups that arise infinitely often have been determined up to degree 7 - the state of the art in 2026 is summarized in Najman (2026). The following table gives the set of all prime numbers $S(d)$ that actually arise as the order of a torsion point $P\in E(K)_{\text{tors}}$, and the set of all prime numbers $S'(d)$ that arise infinitely often, where $\text{Primes}(q)$ denotes the set of all prime numbers at most q (Derickx et al. (2023) and Khawaja (2024)).

Primes that occur resp. occur infinitely often as orders of torsion points in small degree $d$
$d$	1	2	3	4	5	6	7	8
$S(d)$	$\text{Primes}(7)$	$\text{Primes}(13)$	$\text{Primes}(13)$	$\text{Primes}(17)$	$\text{Primes}(19)$	$\text{Primes}(19)\cup\{37\}$	$\text{Primes}(23)$	$\text{Primes}(23)$
$S'(d)$	$\text{Primes}(7)$	$\text{Primes}(13)$	$\text{Primes}(13)$	$\text{Primes}(17)$	$\text{Primes}(19)$	$\text{Primes}(19)$	$\text{Primes}(23)$	$\text{Primes}(23)$

Barry Mazur gave a survey talk on the torsion conjecture on the occasion of the establishment of the Ogg Professorship at the Institute for Advanced Study in October 2022.

== Abelian Varieties ==
The uniform boundedness conjecture for higher-dimensional abelian varieties is still largely unresolved, even in the setting of abelian surfaces. In the special case of abelian surfaces defined over $\Q$ with geometric endomorphism ring equal to a maximal order in a non-split quaternion algebra, Jef Laga, Ciarna Schembri, Ari Shnidman, and John Voight established an explicit bound of $18$ on the size of the torsion group (Laga et al. (2024)). A proof assuming a generalized Szpiro conjecture is recently claimed in a preprint by Ziyang Gao and Kaiyuan Gu (Gao & Gu (2026)).

In contrast, the situation over characteristic-zero function fields is better understood. Benjamin Bakker and Jacob Tsimerman proved the conjecture for abelian surfaces (Bakker & Tsimerman (2018)) via techniques from hyperbolic geometry, a recent preprint by Nicole Looper and Jit Wu Yap claims a proof in full generality (Looper & Yap 2026), and an alternative proof with explicit bounds is claimed by Ziyang Gao and Kaiyuan Gu (Gao & Gu (2026)).

== See also ==
- Bombieri–Lang conjecture
- Uniform boundedness conjecture for preperiodic points
- Uniform boundedness conjecture for rational points

== Bibliography ==
- Kamienny, Sheldon (1992). "Torsion points on elliptic curves and $q$-coefficients of modular forms". Inventiones Mathematicae. 109 (2): 221–229. Bibcode:1992InMat.109..221K. doi:10.1007/BF01232025. MR 1172689. S2CID 118750444.
- Kamienny, Sheldon; Mazur, Barry (1995). "Rational torsion of prime order in elliptic curves over number fields". Astérisque. 228. With an appendix by A. Granville: 81–100. MR 1330929.
- Mazur, Barry (1977). "Modular curves and the Eisenstein ideal". Publications Mathématiques de l'IHÉS. 47 (1): 33–186. doi:10.1007/BF02684339. MR 0488287. S2CID 122609075.
- Mazur, Barry (1978), "Rational isogenies of prime degree", Inventiones Mathematicae, 44 (2), with appendix by Dorian Goldfeld: 129–162, Bibcode:1978InMat..44..129M, doi:10.1007/BF01390348, MR 0482230, S2CID 121987166
- Merel, Loïc (1996). "Bornes pour la torsion des courbes elliptiques sur les corps de nombres" [Bounds for the torsion of elliptic curves over number fields]. Inventiones Mathematicae (in French). 124 (1): 437–449. Bibcode:1996InMat.124..437M. doi:10.1007/s002220050059. MR 1369424. S2CID 3590991.
- Nagell, Trygve (1952). "Problems in the theory of exceptional points on plane cubics of genus one". Den 11te Skandinaviske Matematikerkongress, Trondheim 1949, Oslo. Johan Grundt Tanum forlag. pp. 71–76. OCLC 608098404.
- Najman, Filip (2026). "Torsion groups of elliptic curves that appear infinitely often over septic fields". arXiv:2602.03513 [math.NT].
- Ogg, Andrew (1971). "Rational points of finite order on elliptic curves". Inventiones Mathematicae. 22 (2): 105–111. Bibcode:1971InMat..12..105O. doi:10.1007/BF01404654. S2CID 121794531.
- Ogg, Andrew (1973). "Rational points on certain elliptic modular curves". Proc. Symp. Pure Math. Proceedings of Symposia in Pure Mathematics. 24: 221–231. doi:10.1090/pspum/024/0337974. ISBN 9780821814246.
- Parent, Pierre (1999). "Bornes effectives pour la torsion des courbes elliptiques sur les corps de nombres" [Effective bounds for the torsion of elliptic curves over number fields]. Journal für die Reine und Angewandte Mathematik (in French). 1999 (506): 85–116. arXiv:alg-geom/9611022. doi:10.1515/crll.1999.009. MR 1665681.
- Schappacher, Norbert; Schoof, René (1996), "Beppo Levi and the arithmetic of elliptic curves" (PDF), The Mathematical Intelligencer, 18 (1): 57–69, doi:10.1007/bf03024818, MR 1381581, S2CID 125072148, Zbl 0849.01036
- Sutherland, Andrew V. (2012). "Torsion subgroups of elliptic curves over number fields" (PDF). math.mit.edu.
- Derickx, Maarten; Kamienny, Sheldon; Stein, William; Stoll, Michael (2023). "Torsion points on elliptic curves over number fields of small degree". Algebra & Number Theory. 17 (2): 267–308. arXiv:1707.00364. doi:10.2140/ant.2023.17.267.
- Khawaja, Maleeha (2024). "Torsion primes for elliptic curves over degree 8 number fields". Research in Number Theory. 10 (2) 48. arXiv:2304.14284. doi:10.1007/s40993-024-00533-6.
- Laga, Jef; Schembri, Ciaran; Shnidman, Ari; Voight, John (2024). "Rational torsion points on abelian surfaces with quaternionic multiplication". Forum of Mathematics Sigma. 12 e92. arXiv:2308.15193. doi:10.1017/fms.2024.105.
- Bakker, Benjamin; Tsimerman, Jacob (2018). "The geometric torsion conjecture for abelian varieties with real multiplication". Journal of Differential Geometry. 109 (3): 379–409. arXiv:1504.02090. Bibcode:2018JDGeo.10988186B. doi:10.4310/jdg/1531188186.
- Looper, Nicole; Yap, Jit Wu (2026). "Uniform boundedness of small points on abelian varieties over function fields". arXiv:2603.23396 [math.NT].
- Gao, Ziyang; Gu, Kaiyuan (2026). "Uniformity in rational torsion and small points on abelian varieties". arXiv:2608.22285 [math.NT].
