= Numan Satimov =

Soviet/Uzbek mathematician (1939 – 2006)

Numan Yunusovich Satimov
- Нуман Юнусович Сатимов
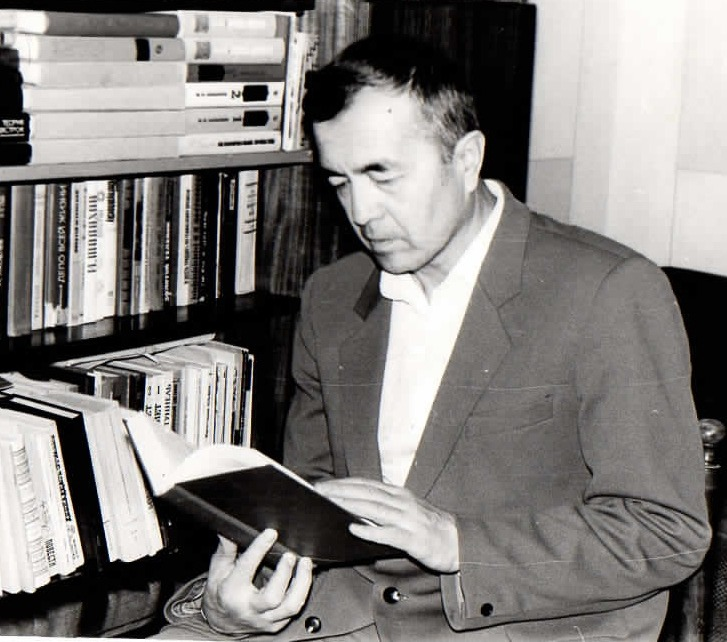
- Born: 15 December 1939; Andijan, Uzbek SSR
- Died: 22 September 2006 (aged 66); Tashkent, Uzbekistan
- Citizenship: Soviet Union → Uzbekistan
- Education: MSU named after M. V. Lomonosov
- Scientific career
- Fields: Differential equation, Control theory
- Workplaces: National University of Uzbekistan named after Mirzo Ulugbek, The Uzbek Academy of Sciences' Romanovsky Institute of Mathematics
- Doctoral advisor: E. F. Mischenko
- Other academic advisors: V. G. Boltyansky

Numan Yunusovich Satimov (Russian: Нуман Юнусович Сатимов) (15 December 1939 – 22 September 2006) was a Soviet and Uzbek mathematician, Doktor Nauk in Physical and Mathematical Sciences, academician of the Academy of Sciences of Uzbekistan (2000), and corresponding member of the Academy of Sciences of UzSSR from 1979 to 2006, and a laureate of the Biruni State Prize (1985). He was a specialist in the theory of differential equations, control theory and their applications.

== Biography ==
Satimov was born on 15 December 1939 in the city of Andijan in a working-class family.

In 1956, he was accepted to the Central Asian State University at the Faculty of Physics and Mathematics. In 1958, Satimov continued his studies at the Moscow State University named after M. V. Lomonosov at the Faculty of Mechanics and Mathematics. After graduating from the university in 1962, he entered graduate school at the Uzbek Academy of Sciences' Romanovsky Institute of Mathematics, where he worked as a junior research fellow from 1965 to 1968.

In 1968, under the guidance of Professor V. G. Boltyansky, Satimov defended his thesis. In 1977, under the guidance of Professor E. F. Mischenko, he defended his doctoral dissertation (at the specialized council of Steklov Institute of Mathematics). In 1978, he was awarded the title of professor. In 1979, he became a corresponding member of the Academy of Sciences of the Uzbek SSR, in 2000 – academician of the Academy of Sciences of the Republic of Uzbekistan.

Since 1968, Satimov worked in Tashkent State University. In 1971, he became the head of a department at the Faculty of Applied Mathematics and Mechanics of NUUz. From 1974 to 1976, Satimov worked as a senior research fellow at Steklov Institute of Mathematics. From 1985 to 1987 he served as the dean of the Faculty of Applied Mathematics and Mechanics. Since 2000, he was a leading researcher at the Uzbek Academy of Sciences' Romanovsky Institute of Mathematics.

Satimov died on 22 September 2006. He was buried at the Chagatai cemetery in Tashkent.

== Scientific interests ==
Satimov's primary research interest included the theory of differential equations, control theory and their applications. He founded the Tashkent Scientific School on the theory of controls and differential games. He led the research seminar “Optimal processes and differential games” for over 35 years.

Moreover, Satimov is the author of a textbook on differential equations and two monographs. He published more than 180 scientific papers; most of which have been translated and published in US and UK journals. Under his guidance, eight doctoral and more than twenty master's theses were prepared.

Since 1970, Satimov worked on a new section of the theory of controlled processes – the theory of differential pursuit–evasion games. He paid particular attention to the development of L. S. Pontryagin's methods. As a result, Satimov proposed and later developed the so-called third (modified) method for solving the problem of persecution.

== Bibliography ==
- Задача об уклонении от встреч в дифференциальных играх с нелинейными управлениями // Дифференц. уравнения, 1973 г., Т. 9, No. 10, С. 1792—1797 (совместно с Е. Ф. Мищенко).
- Н. Сатимов, “К задаче убегания в дифференциальных играх с нелинейными управлениями”, Докл. АН СССР, 216:4 (1974), 744–747.
- N. Satimov, On the pursuit problem relative to position in differential games, Dokl. Akad. Nauk SSSR, 1976, Volume 229, Number 4, 808–811.
- Н. Ю. Сатимов, А. З. Фазылов, А. А. Хамдамов, “О задачах преследования и уклонения в дифференциальных и дискретных играх многих лиц с интегральными ограничениями”, Дифференц. уравнения, 20:8 (1984), 1388–1396.
- Н. Сатимов "Избежание столкновений в линейных системах с интегральными ограничениями" // Сердика, Болгарска, 1989 г., т. 15 (совместно с, А. З. Фазыловым).
- N. Yu. Satimov, M. Tukhtasinov, Game problems on a fixed interval in controlled first-order evolution equations, Mathematical Notes, 2006, Volume 80, Issue 3–4, pp 587–589.
- N. Yu. Satimov, M. Tukhtasimov, Evasion in a certain class of distributed control systems, Mathematical Notes, May 2015, Volume 97, Issue 5–6, pp 764–773.
- К оценке некоторых областей целочисленных точек. В кн.: Математические методы распознавания образов: Доклады 10-й Всероссийской конференции, Москва, 2001, РАН Вычислительный центр при поддержке Российского Фонда Фундаментальных Исследований, С. 125—126 (совместно с Б. Б. Акбаралиевым)
