= Loïc Merel =

French mathematician (born 1965)

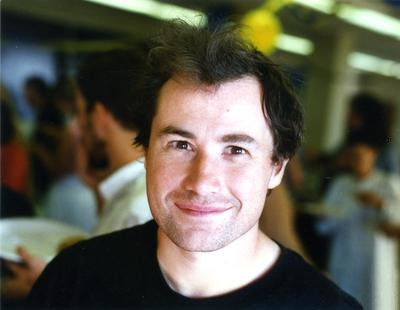
- Born: 13 August 1965 (age 61); Carhaix-Plouguer, Brittany
- Education: Pierre and Marie Curie University
- Known for: Proof of the torsion conjecture for elliptic curves over any number field
- Awards: Blumenthal Award (1997); EMS Prize (1996); Saintour Prize (1994); Peccot Prize (1995)
- Scientific career
- Fields: Mathematics
- Workplaces: Paris Diderot University
- Thesis: Quelques aspects arithmétiques et géométriques de la théorie des symboles modulaires (1993)
- Doctoral advisor: Joseph Oesterlé

Loïc Merel (born 13 August 1965) is a French mathematician. His research interests include modular forms and number theory.

== Career ==
Born in Carhaix-Plouguer, Brittany, Merel became a student at the École Normale Supérieure. He finished his doctorate at Pierre and Marie Curie University under supervision of Joseph Oesterlé in 1993. His thesis on modular symbols took inspiration from the work of Yuri Manin and Barry Mazur from the 1970s. In 1996, Merel proved the torsion conjecture for elliptic curves over any number field (which was only known for number fields of degree up to 8 at the time). In recognition of his achievement, in 1998 he was an Invited Speaker of the International Congress of Mathematicians in Berlin.

== Awards ==
Merel has received numerous awards, including the EMS Prize (1996), the Blumenthal Award (1997) for the advancement of research in pure mathematics, and the Grand Prix Jacques Herbrand (1998) of the French Academy of Sciences.
