= Tower of fields =

Sequence of field extensions in mathematics

In mathematics, specifically number theory, a tower of fields is a sequence of field extensions

$$F_0 \subseteq F_1 \subseteq \cdots \subseteq F_n \subseteq \cdots$$

A tower of fields may be finite or infinite.

== Examples ==
- $\Q \subseteq \R \subseteq \C$ is a finite tower of the rational, real and complex numbers.
- The sequence obtained by setting $F_0 = \Q$ and letting

$$F_n = F_{n-1}\big(2^{1/2^n}\big)$$

for $n\geq 1$ (i.e. $F_n$ is obtained from $F_{n-1}$ by adjoining a $2^n$-th root of $2$) is an infinite tower.

- Similarly, if $p$ is a prime number, the pth cyclotomic tower of $\Q$ is obtained by setting $F_0 = \Q$ and letting $F_n$ be the field obtained by adjoining to $\Q$ the $p^n$-th roots of unity. This tower is of fundamental importance in Iwasawa theory.
- The Golod–Shafarevich theorem shows that there are infinite towers obtained by iterating the Hilbert class field construction to a number field.
