= Néron–Ogg–Shafarevich criterion =

In mathematics, the Néron–Ogg–Shafarevich criterion states that if $A$ is an elliptic curve or abelian variety over a local field $K$, and $\ell$ is a prime not dividing the characteristic of the residue field of $K$, then $A$ has good reduction if and only if the $\ell$-adic Tate module $T_\ell$ of $A$ is unramified.

Andrew Ogg introduced the criterion for elliptic curves. Jean-Pierre Serre and John Tate used the results of André Néron to extend it to abelian varieties, and named the criterion after Ogg, Néron and Igor Shafarevich (commenting that Ogg's result seems to have been known to Shafarevich).
