= Dimensions (animation) =

Dimensions is a French project that makes educational movies about mathematics, focusing on spatial geometry. It uses POV-Ray to render some of the animations, and the films are released under a Creative Commons licence.

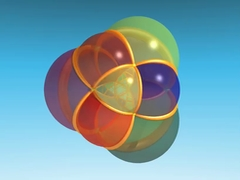
The fourth chapter, showing the stereographic projection of a polychoron on our three-dimensional space.

The film is separated in nine chapters, which follow this plot:

- Chapter 1: Dimension two explains Earth's coordinate system, and introduces the stereographic projection.
- Chapter 2: Dimension three discusses how two-dimensional beings would imagine three-dimensional objects.
- Chapters 3 and 4: The fourth dimension talks about four-dimensional polytopes (polychora), projecting the regular ones stereographically on the three-dimensional space.
- Chapters 5 and 6: Complex numbers are about the square root of negative numbers, transformations, and fractals.
- Chapters 7 and 8: Fibration show what a fibration is. Complex numbers are used again, and there are circles and tori rotating and being transformed.
- Chapter 9: Proof emphasizes the importance of proofs in mathematics, and proves the circle-conservationess of the stereographic projection as an example.

They are available for download in several languages.
