= Sara Shakulova =

Russian mathematician

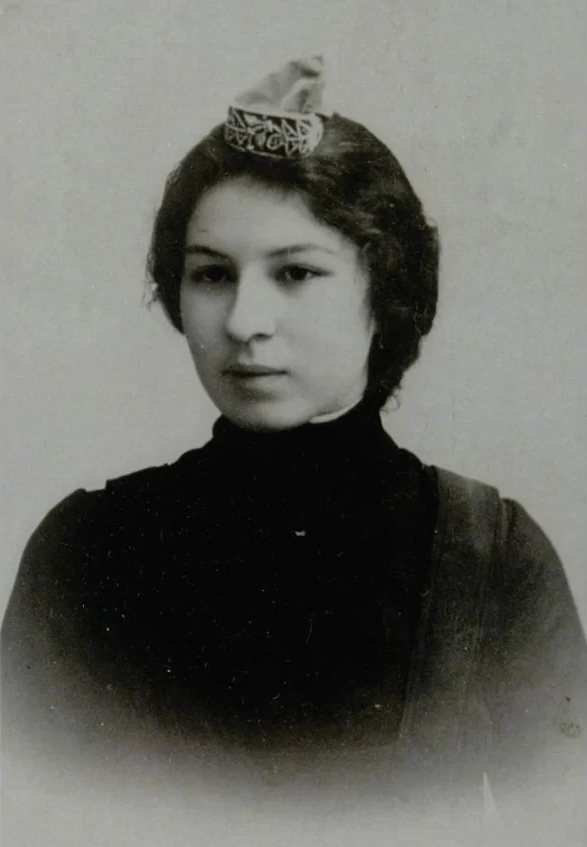
- Born: 27 July 1887; Kasimov
- Died: 5 September 1964 (aged 77); Moscow

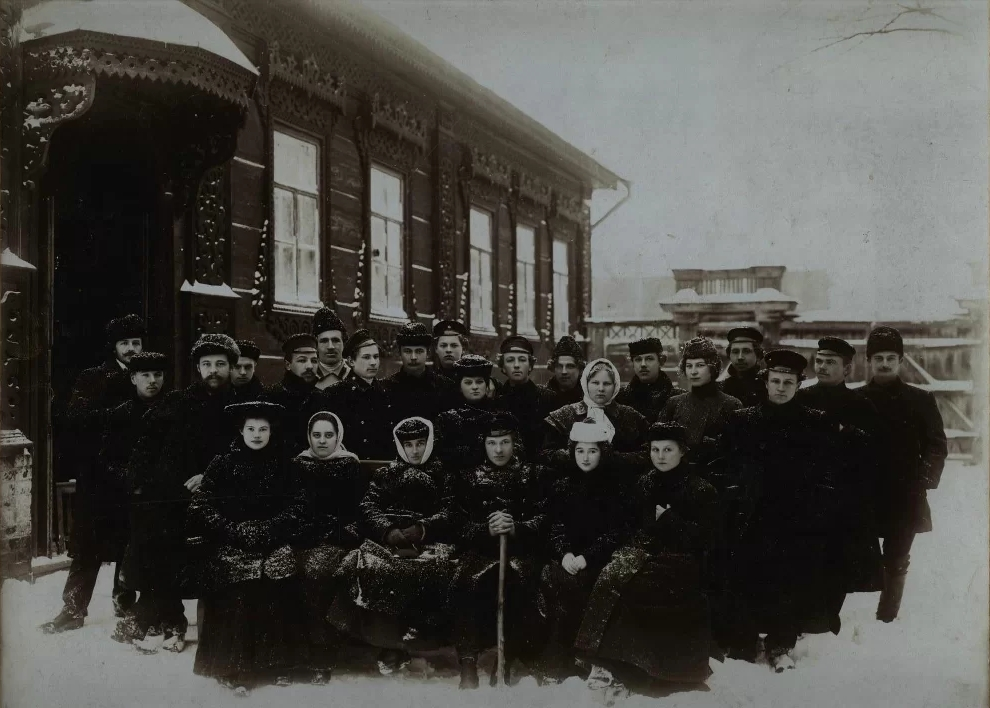
Sara Shakulova (fifth from right) with revolutionaries, 1907–1908.

Sayyidah Sara Kasimovna Shakulova (Russian: Сара Касимовна Шакулова; 27 July 1887 — 5 September 1964) was a Russian mathematician and the first female mathematician of Tatar descent.

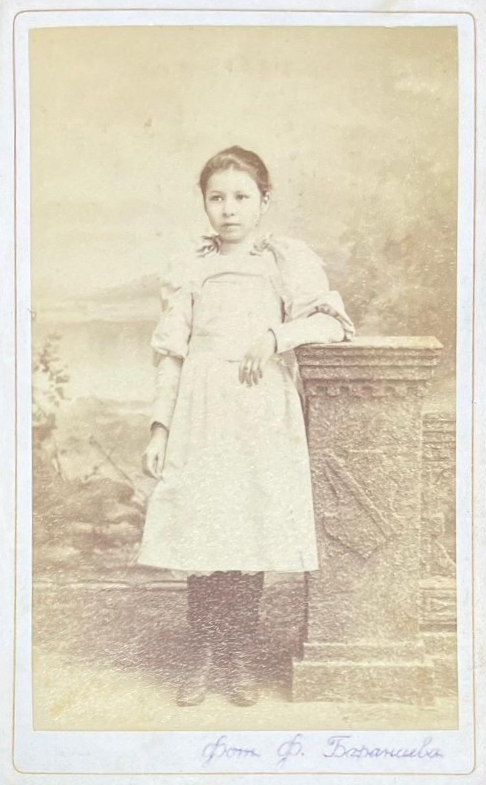
Sara Shakulova in childhood

Shakulova taught maths at the Zaraysky Real College in Ryazan Governorate (1915–1916), with a salary of 112-185 rubles, Kazan Urban Female Commercial College (1916–1919), Tatar Aitova School, and L. Khusainova Female School. In 1919–1923, she worked as vice people's commissar for education and head of the Main Office for Professional Technical Education of the Bashkir ASSR. She was a private teacher from 1912 to 1915 and spoke Tatar, Russian and French.

In April 1917, she took part in the All-Russian Congress of Muslim Women in Kazan.

In 1923, on the invitation of the People's Commissariat for Education, she moved to Moscow, where she worked as inspector of non-Russian language schools. At the same time, she taught maths in schools and higher educational institutions. From 1925, she was the director of the N. Narimanov Tatar School No. 1 in Moscow. From 1938 to 1963 she taught at technical universities in Moscow. Shakulova was a teacher until she was 75.

== Personal life ==
She had a mother, Fatyma Aynutdinovna, who was 30 years older than her, a brother, Akhmeta, who was 3 years older than her, and sisters Leyla and Amina, 12 and 14 years younger respectively. Her father was named Kasimkhan Khusainovich Shakulova and worked in leather processing and sales.

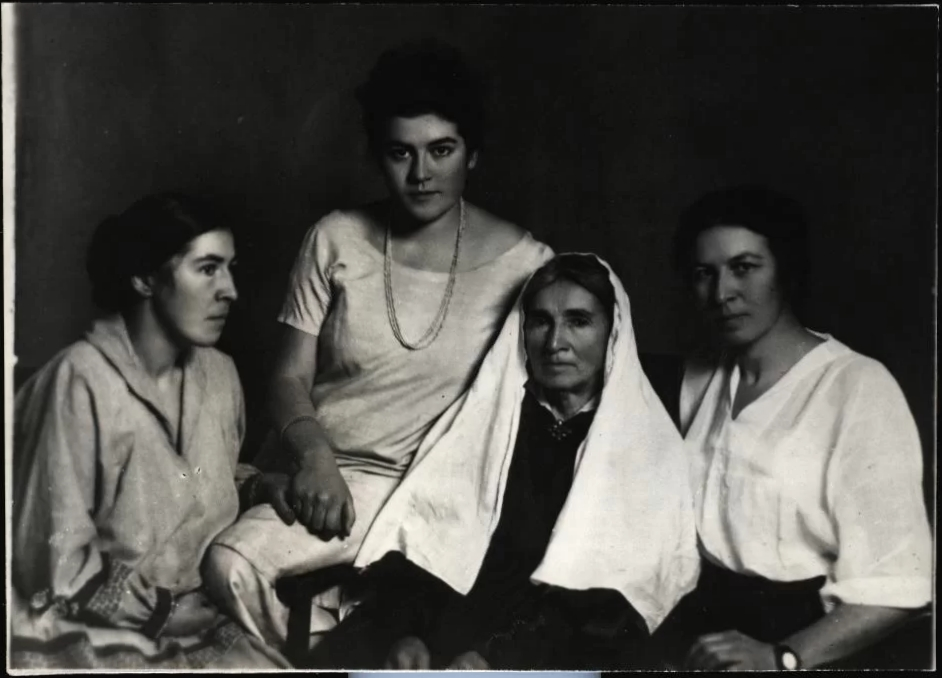
The Shakulov family (from left to right)— Leyla Kasimovna, Amina Kasimovna, Fatyma Ainetdinovna, Sara Kasimovna.

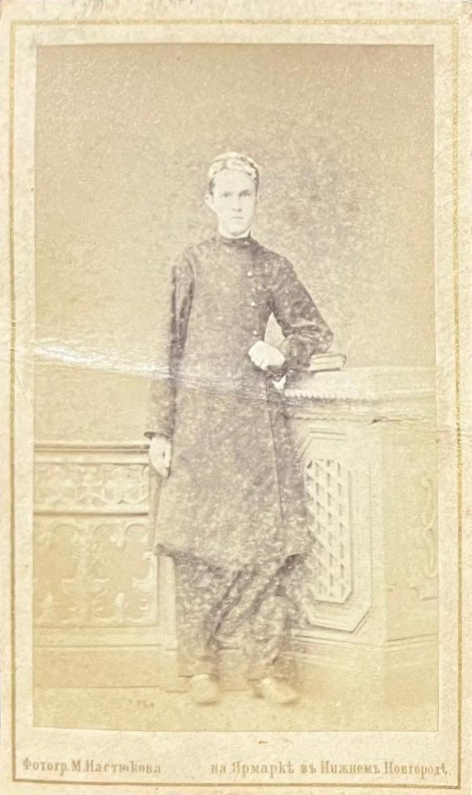
Kasymkhan Khusainovich Shakulova

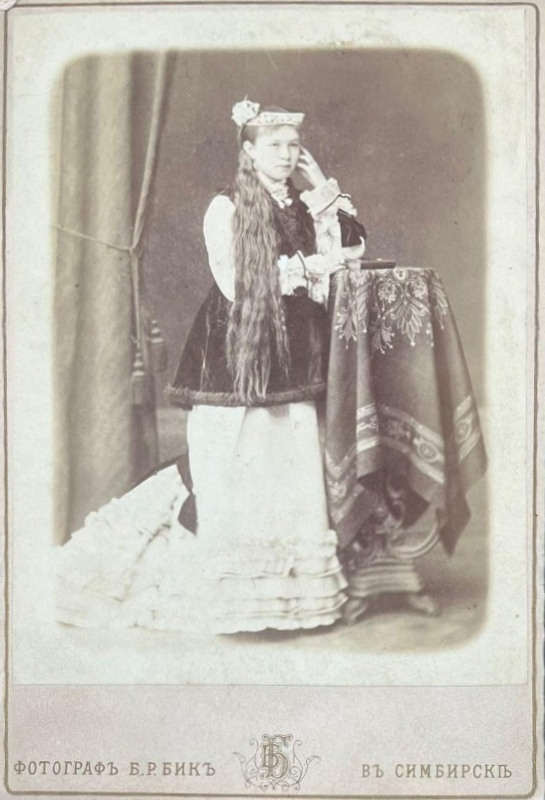
Fatyma Shakulova

Sara Shakulova died on 5 September 1964 and was buried at the Danilovskoye Muslim Cemetery in Moscow.

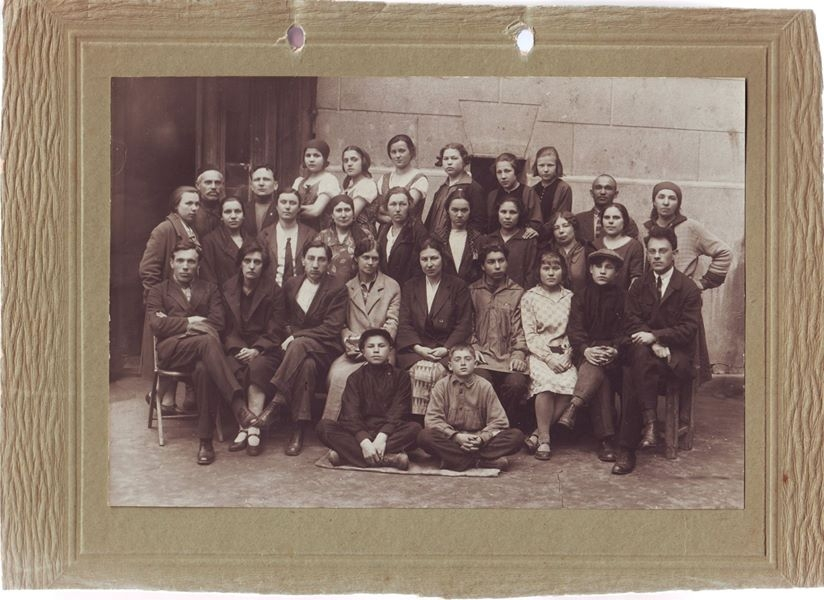
Sara Shakulova with students, 1920s
