= Euler circle =

Euler circle may refer to:

- Nine-point circle, a circle that can be constructed for any given triangle
- Euler diagram, a diagrammatic means of representing propositions and their relationships
- Venn diagram, a diagram type originally also called Euler circle
