= Igor Dolgachev =

Russian–American mathematician

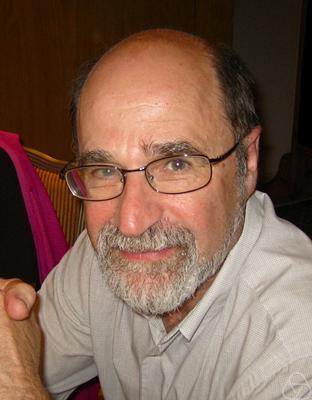
- Born: April 7, 1944 (age 82)
- Education: Moscow State University (Ph.D.)
- Known for: Dolgachev surface
- Scientific career
- Fields: Mathematics
- Workplaces: Michigan (1978–)
- Thesis: On the purity of the degeneration locus of families of curves (1969)
- Doctoral advisor: Igor Shafarevich

Igor V. Dolgachev (born 7 April 1944) is a Russian–American mathematician specializing in algebraic geometry. He has been a professor at the University of Michigan since 1978. He introduced Dolgachev surfaces in 1981.

Dolgachev completed his Ph.D. at Moscow State University in 1970, with thesis On the purity of the degeneration locus of families of curves written under the supervision of Igor Shafarevich.
