= Grothendieck–Ogg–Shafarevich formula =

In mathematics, the Grothendieck–Ogg–Shafarevich formula describes the Euler characteristic of a complete curve with coefficients in an abelian variety or constructible sheaf, in terms of local data involving the Swan conductor. Andrew Ogg (1962) and Igor Shafarevich (1961) proved the formula for abelian varieties with tame ramification over curves, and Alexander Grothendieck (1977, Exp. X formula 7.2) extended the formula to constructible sheaves over a curve (Raynaud 1965).

== Statement ==
Suppose that F is a constructible sheaf over a genus g smooth projective curve C, of rank n outside a finite set X of points where it has stalk 0. Then

$$\chi(C,F) = n(2-2g) -\sum_{x\in X}(n+Sw_x(F))$$

where Sw is the Swan conductor at a point.
