= Shafarevich–Weil theorem =

Theorem in algebraic number theory

In algebraic number theory, the Shafarevich–Weil theorem relates the fundamental class of a Galois extension of local or global fields to an extension of Galois groups. It was introduced by Shafarevich (1946) for local fields and by Weil (1951) for global fields.

== Statement ==
Suppose that F is a global field, K is a normal extension of F, and L is an abelian extension of K. Then the Galois group Gal(L/F) is an extension of the group Gal(K/F) by the abelian group Gal(L/K), and this extension corresponds to an element of the cohomology group H^{2}(Gal(K/F), Gal(L/K)). On the other hand, class field theory gives a fundamental class in H^{2}(Gal(K/F),I_{K}) and a reciprocity law map from I_{K} to Gal(L/K). The Shafarevich–Weil theorem states that the class of the extension Gal(L/F) is the image of the fundamental class under the homomorphism of cohomology groups induced by the reciprocity law map (Artin & Tate 2009, p.246).

Shafarevich stated his theorem for local fields in terms of division algebras rather than the fundamental class (Weil 1967). In this case, with L the maximal abelian extension of K, the extension Gal(L/F) corresponds under the reciprocity map to the normalizer of K in a division algebra of degree [K:F] over F, and Shafarevich's theorem states that the Hasse invariant of this division algebra is 1/[K:F]. The relation to the previous version of the theorem is that division algebras correspond to elements of a second cohomology group (the Brauer group) and under this correspondence the division algebra with Hasse invariant 1/[K:F] corresponds to the fundamental class.
