= Shafarevich's theorem on solvable Galois groups =

Mathematical theorem

In mathematics, Shafarevich's theorem states that any finite solvable group is the Galois group of some finite extension of the rational numbers. It was first proved by Igor Shafarevich (1954), though Alexander Schmidt later pointed out a gap in the proof, which was fixed by Shafarevich (1989).
