= Golod–Shafarevich theorem =

Field in algebra

In mathematics, the Golod–Shafarevich theorem is a result in non-commutative homological algebra which solves the class field tower problem by showing that class field towers can be infinite. It is named after Evgeny Golod and Igor Shafarevich, who proved it in 1964.

== Statement of the inequality ==
Let $A=K\langle x_1,\dots,x_n\rangle$ be the free algebra over a field $K$ in $n=d+1$ non-commuting variables, and let $J$ be the two-sided ideal of $A$ generated by homogeneous elements $f_j$ of $A$ of degree $d_j$ with

$$2\leq d_1\leq d_2\leq \cdots$$

where $d_j$ tends to infinity. Let $r_i$ be the number of $d_j$ equal to $i$, for all $i\geq 2$.

Let $B = A/J$; this is a graded algebra. Let $b_j=\dim B_j$. The fundamental inequality of Golod and Shafarevich states that

$$b_j\geq nb_{j-1} -\sum_{i=2}^{j} b_{j-i} r_i.$$

for all $j$. As a consequence, $B$ is infinite-dimensional if $r_i \leq d^2/4$ for all $i\geq 2$.

== Applications ==
This result has important applications in combinatorial group theory:

- If $G$ is a non-trivial finite p-group, then $r > d^2/4$, where $d = \dim H^1(G,\mathbb{Z}/p\mathbb{Z})$ and $r = \dim H^2(G,\mathbb{Z}/p\mathbb{Z})$ (the mod $p$ cohomology groups of $G$). In particular, if $G$ is a finite $p$-group with minimal number of generators $d$ and has $r$ relators in a given presentation, then $r > d^2/4$.
- For each prime $p$, there is an infinite group $G$ generated by three elements in which each element has order a power of $p$. The group $G$ provides a counterexample to the generalised Burnside conjecture: it is a finitely generated infinite torsion group, although there is no uniform bound on the order of its elements.

=== Class field theory ===
In class field theory, the class field tower of a number field is created by iterating the Hilbert class field construction. The class field tower problem asks whether this tower is always finite. A consequence of the Golod–Shafarevich theorem is that such towers may be infinite (in other words, do not always terminate in a field equal to its Hilbert class field). Specifically, if $K$ is an imaginary quadratic field whose discriminant has at least six prime factors, then the maximal unramified 2-extension of $K$ has infinite degree.

More generally, a number field with sufficiently many prime factors in the discriminant has an infinite class field tower.
