= Igor Shafarevich =

Soviet and Russian mathematician and political dissident

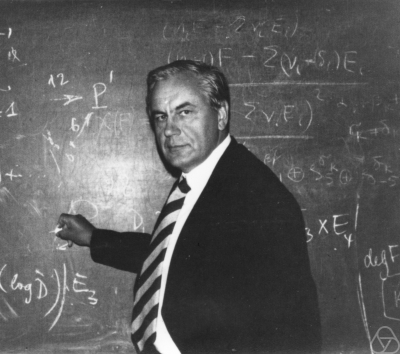
- Born: Igor Rostislavovich Shafarevich; 3 June 1923; Zhytomyr, Ukrainian SSR, Soviet Union
- Died: 19 February 2017 (aged 93); Moscow, Russia
- Education: Steklov Institute of Mathematics
- Known for: Shafarevich–Weil theorem, Golod–Shafarevich theorem, Shafarevich's theorem on solvable Galois groups, Grothendieck–Ogg–Shafarevich formula, Néron–Ogg–Shafarevich criterion
- Awards: Leonhard Euler Gold Medal (2017)
- Scientific career
- Fields: Mathematics
- Workplaces: Lomonosov Moscow State University
- Doctoral advisor: Boris Delaunay
- Doctoral students: Igor Dolgachev; Evgeny Golod; Alexei Kostrikin; Yuri Manin; Boris Moishezon; Aleksei Parshin; Yuriy Drozd

Igor Rostislavovich Shafarevich (Russian: И́горь Ростисла́вович Шафаре́вич; 3 June 1923 – 19 February 2017) was a Soviet and Russian mathematician who contributed to algebraic number theory and algebraic geometry. Outside mathematics, he wrote books and articles that criticised socialism, as well as other literature which some described as antisemitic.

== Mathematics ==
From his early years, Shafarevich made fundamental contributions to several parts of mathematics including algebraic number theory, algebraic geometry and arithmetic algebraic geometry. In particular, in algebraic number theory, the Shafarevich–Weil theorem extends the commutative reciprocity map to the case of Galois groups, which are central extensions of abelian groups by finite groups.

Shafarevich was the first mathematician to give a completely self-contained formula for the Hilbert pairing, thus initiating an important branch of the study of explicit formulas in number theory. Another famous (and slightly incomplete) result is Shafarevich's theorem on solvable Galois groups, giving the realization of every finite solvable group as a Galois group over the rationals.

Another development is the Golod–Shafarevich theorem on towers of unramified extensions of number fields.

Shafarevich and his school greatly contributed to the study of algebraic geometry of surfaces. He started a famous Moscow seminar on classification of algebraic surfaces that updated the treatment of birational geometry around 1960 and was largely responsible for the early introduction of the scheme theory approach to algebraic geometry in the Soviet school. His investigation in arithmetic of elliptic curves led him, independently of John Tate, to the introduction of the group related to elliptic curves over number fields, the Tate–Shafarevich group (usually called 'Sha', and denoted as 'Ш', the first Cyrillic letter of his surname).

He contributed the Grothendieck–Ogg–Shafarevich formula and to the Néron–Ogg–Shafarevich criterion.

With former student Ilya Piatetski-Shapiro, he proved a version of the Torelli theorem for K3 surfaces.

He formulated the Shafarevich conjecture, which stated the finiteness of the set of Abelian varieties over a number field having fixed dimension and prescribed set of primes of bad reduction. The conjecture was proved by Gerd Faltings as a partial step in his proof of the Mordell conjecture.

Shafarevich's students included Yuri Manin, Alexey Parshin, Igor Dolgachev, Evgeny Golod, Alexei Kostrikin, Suren Arakelov, G. V. Belyi, Victor Abrashkin, Andrey Todorov, Andrey N. Tyurin, and Victor Kolyvagin.

He was a member of the Serbian Academy of Sciences and Arts in the department of Mathematics, Physics and Earth Sciences. In 1960, he was elected a Member of the German Academy of Sciences Leopoldina. In 1981, he was elected as a foreign member of the Royal Society.

In 2017, Shafarevich was awarded the Leonhard Euler Gold Medal by the Russian Academy of Sciences.

== Soviet politics ==
Shafarevich came into conflict with the Soviet authorities in the early 1950s but was protected by Ivan Petrovsky, the Rector of Moscow University. He belonged to a group of Pochvennichestvo-influenced dissidents who endorsed the Eastern Orthodox tradition. Shafarevich published a book, The Socialist Phenomenon (French edition 1975, English edition 1980), which was cited by Aleksandr Solzhenitsyn in his 1978 address to Harvard University.

In the 1970s, Shafarevich, with Valery Chalidze, Grigori Podyapolski and Andrei Tverdokhlebov, became one of Andrei Sakharov's human rights investigators and so was dismissed from Moscow University. Shafarevich opposed political interference in universities.

== The Socialist Phenomenon ==
Shafarevich's book The Socialist Phenomenon, which was published in the US by Harper & Row in 1980, analyzed numerous examples of socialism from ancient times to various medieval heresies and a variety of modern thinkers and socialist states. From those examples, he claimed that all the basic principles of socialist ideology derive from the urge to suppress individualism. The Socialist Phenomenon consists of three major parts:

1. Chiliastic Socialism: Identifies socialist ideas amongst the ancient Greeks, especially Plato, in numerous medieval heretic groups such as the Cathars, Brethren of the Free Spirit, Taborites, Anabaptists, in various religious groups during the English Civil War, in modern writers such as Thomas More, Tommaso Campanella and numerous Enlightenment writers in 18th-century France.
2. State Socialism: Describes the socialism of the Incas, the Jesuit state in Paraguay, Mesopotamia, Egypt and China.
3. Analysis: Identifies three persistent abolition themes in socialism: the abolition of private property, the abolition of the family, and the abolition of religion (mainly but not exclusively Christianity).

Shafarevich argued that ancient socialism (such as Mesopotamia and Egypt) was not ideological, as an ideology socialism was a reaction to the emergence of individualism in the Axial Age. He compared Thomas More's (Utopia) and Tommaso Campanella's (City of the Sun) visions with what is known about the Inca Empire and concluded that there are striking similarities. He claimed that we become persons through our relationship with God and argued that socialism is essentially nihilistic and is unconsciously motivated by a death instinct. He concluded that we have the choice of pursuing death or life.

== Religious views ==
Shafarevich adhered to Russian Orthodox Christianity and incorporated the neo-Platonic views of Eastern Orthodoxy into his understanding of the relation of mathematics and religion.

In his talk to the Göttingen Academy of Sciences upon receiving a prize, Shafarevich presented his view of the relationship between mathematics and religion. He noted the multiple discoveries in mathematics, such as that of non-Euclidean geometry, to suggest that pure mathematics reflects an objective reality, not a set of conventional definitions or a formalism. He claimed that the growth of mathematics itself is not directed or organic. To have a unity and direction, mathematics needs a goal. It can be practical applications or God as the source for the direction of development. Shafarevich opted for the latter, as pure mathematics is not in itself driven by practical applications.

== Russian politics ==
On 21 December 1991 he took part in the first congress of the Russian All-People's Union, headed by Sergei Baburin. In October 1992, he became a member of the founding committee of the National Salvation Front. In 1993, he was an unsuccessful candidate for the State Duma with Mikhail Astafyev's Constitutional Democratic Party - Party of Popular Freedom.

Shafarevich was a member of the editorial board of the magazine Nash Sovremennik and in 1991–1992 of the editorial board of Den of Alexander Prokhanov, which was banned in October 1993 following the 1993 Russian constitutional crisis and later reopened under the title Zavtra. In 1994, he joined the "All-Russian National Right Wing Centre", led by Mikhail Astafyev.

== Accusations of antisemitism ==
Shafarevich's essay Russophobia was expanded into his book Three Thousand-Year-Old Mystery (Трехтысячелетняя загадка) and resulted in accusations of antisemitism. He completed the Russophobia essay in 1982 and it was initially circulated as samizdat. In the Soviet Union, it was first officially published in 1989. At the same time, Shafarevich condemned the methods that were used to screen out applicants of Jewish origin when entering prestigious Moscow universities in the 1970s and early 1980s.

In Russophobia, he argued in the essay that great nations experience periods in their history of reformist elitist groups ('small nations') having values that differ fundamentally from the values of the majority of the people but gaining the upper hand in the society. In Shafarevich's opinion, the role of such a 'small nation' in Russia was played by a small group of intelligentsiya, dominated by Jews, "who were full of hatred against traditional Russian way of life and played an active role in the terrorist regimes of Vladimir Lenin and Joseph Stalin".

Its publication led to a request by the United States National Academy of Sciences (NAS) to Shafarevich to resign his membership, because the NAS charter prohibited stripping an existing membership. In an open letter to the NAS, Shafarevich explained that Russophobia is not antisemitic. Shafarevich also noted that since NAS enlisted him without his request or knowledge, delisting him was its internal matter. Nevertheless, when the United States invaded Iraq, Shafarevich faxed his resignation.

Accusations of antisemitism continued and involved Shafarevich's other publications. Semyon Reznik targets the Russophobia essay for factual inaccuracies: Shafarevich misassigned Jewish ethnicity to a number of non-Jews involved in the execution of Nicholas II, repeated the false assertion of graffiti in Yiddish at the murder site and suggested that Shafarevich's phrase "Nicholas II was shot specifically as the Tsar, and this ritual act drew a line under an epoch in Russian history" – is read by some as a blood libel. (An accusation which ignores the remainder of Shafarevich's sentence: "so it can only be compared with the execution of Charles I in England or of Louis XVI in France".) Aron Katsenelinboigen wrote that Shafarevish's work "lives up to the best traditions of antisemitic propaganda".

Later, Shafarevich expanded on his views in his book Three Thousand-Year-Old Mystery in which he further claimed that Jews effectively marginalise and exclude non-Jews in all types of intellectual endeavors. The work was published in Russian in 2002; an introductory section explains the relationship with the Russophobia essay, explaining that the essay developed from an appendix to an intended work of wider scope, which he started writing in samizdat.

In 2005, Shafarevich was amongst the signatories of the Letter of 5000.

The issue of Shafarevich's alleged antisemitism has been the subject of a 2009 doctoral thesis at the University of Helsinki, which was later turned into a book in which the author, Krista Berglund, stated that Shafarevich's views have been misconstrued as antisemitic.

== Publications ==
- Borevich, Z. I.; Shafarevich, Igor R. (1966), Number Theory, Pure and Applied Mathematics, vol. 20, Boston, MA: Academic Press, ISBN 978-0-12-117850-5, MR 0195803
- Shafarevich, Igor R. (1974) [1972], Basic Algebraic Geometry, translated by Hirsch, Kurt, Berlin, New York: Springer-Verlag, ISBN 978-3-540-08264-4, MR 0366916
- Shafarevich, Igor (1975), "Socialism in Our Past and Future." In From under the Rubble, with Solzhenitsyn, Alexander; Agursky, Mikhail; Barabanov, Evgeny; Borisov, Vadim; Korsakov, F. Collins: Harvill Press [Regnery Pub. 1989].
- Shafarevich, Igor (1980), The Socialist Phenomenon, New York: Harper & Row, ISBN 978-0895268778
- Shafarevich, Igor (1981), "On Certain Tendencies in the Development of Mathematics", The Mathematical Intelligencer, Vol. 3, Number 4, pp. 182–184.
- Nikulin, V. V.; Shafarevich, Igor (1987), Geometries and Groups, Berlin; Springer-Verlag, ISBN 0387152814
- Shafarevich, Igor R. (1989), Collected Mathematical Papers, Berlin, New York: Springer-Verlag, ISBN 978-3-540-13618-7, MR 0977275
- Shafarevich, Igor (March 1990). Russophobia (PDF). Joint Publications Research Service. Archived from the original on 7 February 2016.
- Kostrikin, A. I.; Shafarevich, Igor (1991), Noncommutative Rings, Identities, Berlin: Springer-Verlag, ISBN 978-3-642-72899-0
- Parshin, A. N.; Shafarevich, Igor (1995), Number Theory: Fundamental Problems, Ideas, and Theories, Berlin: Springer, ISBN 0387533842
- Arslanov, M. M.; Parshin, A. N.; Shafarevich, Igor (1996), Algebra and Analysis, Berlin: Walter de Gruyter, ISBN 311014803X
- Shafarevich, Igor (2003), Discourses on Algebra, Berlin: Springer, ISBN 978-3-540-42253-2
- Shafarevich, Igor (2005), Basic Notions of Algebra, Berlin: Springer, ISBN 978-3-540-26474-3
- Shafarevich, Igor (2013), Basic Algebraic Geometry 1: Varieties in Projective Space (3rd edition), translated by Reid, Miles, Berlin, Springer-Verlag,ISBN 978-3-642-37955-0
- Shafarevich, Igor (2013), Basic Algebraic Geometry 2: Schemes and Complex Manifolds (3rd edition), translated by Reid, Miles, Berlin, Springer-Verlag,ISBN 978-3-642-38009-9
- Shafarevich, Igor; Remizov, Alexey (2013), Linear Algebra and Geometry, Berlin, Springer-Verlag, ISBN 978-3-642-30993-9
- Shafarevich, Igor (2015), Collected mathematical papers, Reprint of the 1989 edition, Springer Collect. Works Math., Springer, Heidelberg, x+769 pp.
