= Giuseppe Bagnera =

Giuseppe Bagnera may refer to:

- Giuseppe Bagnera (politician) (1878–1953), Italian politician
- Giuseppe Bagnera (mathematician) (1865–1927), Italian mathematician
