= Maria Adelaide =

Maria Adelaide can refer to:

- Marie Adélaïde of Savoy (1685–1712), wife of Louis, Dauphin of France, Duke of Burgundy
- Adelaide of Austria (1822–1855), queen consort of Sardinia
- Infanta Maria Antonia of Portugal (Maria Antonia Adelaide, 1862–1959), daughter of king of Portugal
- Infanta Maria Adelaide of Portugal (1912–2012), daughter of claimant to Portuguese throne
- Maria Adelaide Aboim Inglez (1932–2008), Portuguese communist and opponent of the Estado Novo regime
- Maria Adelaide Amaral (born 1942), Portuguese Brazilian playwright, screenwriter and novelist
- Maria Adelaide Lima Cruz (1908–1985), Portuguese painter and theatrical designer
- Maria Adelaide Sneider (1937–1989), Italian mathematician

== See also ==
- Maria Adelaide Aglietta (1940–2000), Italian politician
- Maria Adelaide Amaral (born 1942), Brazilian writer
- Maria Adelaide Ferreira (born 1959), Portuguese singer
- Nina Ricci (designer) (born Maria Adélaide Nielli, 1883–1970), Italian-born French fashion designer
- Maria Adelaide Sneider (1937–1989), Italian mathematician
