= Gaetano Fichera =

Italian mathematician (1922–1996)

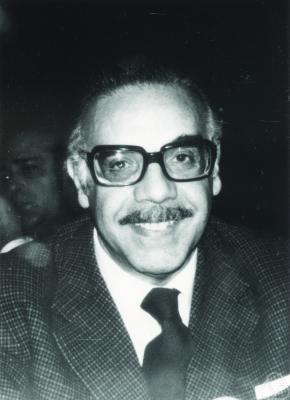
- Gaetano Fichera in 1976 (photo by Konrad Jacobs)
- Born: 8 February 1922; Acireale, Italy
- Died: 1 June 1996 (aged 74); Rome, Italy
- Education: Sapienza University of Rome, 1941
- Known for: Linear elasticity; Mathematical analysis; Variational inequalities; Numerical analysis; Partial differential equations; Several complex variables; Signorini problem; Fichera's existence principle; Fichera problem
- Awards: Columbus Prize (1949); Italian Minister of Education Prize (1961); Antonio Feltrinelli Prize (1976); Golden medal "Benemeriti della Scuola, della Cultura, dell'Arte" (1979); Ivane Javakhishvili Medal (1982); Medal of the University of Perugia for Foreigners (1993)
- Scientific career
- Fields: Mathematics
- Workplaces: Istituto Nazionale di Alta Matematica; Istituto Nazionale per le Applicazioni del Calcolo; Università di Trieste; Sapienza University of Rome
- Doctoral advisor: Mauro Picone
- Doctoral students: Paolo Emilio Ricci; Maria Adelaide Sneider

Gaetano Fichera (8 February 1922 – 1 June 1996) was an Italian mathematician, working in mathematical analysis, linear elasticity, partial differential equations and several complex variables. He was born in Acireale, and died in Rome.

== Biography ==
He was born in Acireale, a town near Catania in Sicily, the elder of the four sons of Giuseppe Fichera and Marianna Abate. His father Giuseppe was a professor of mathematics and influenced the young Gaetano starting his lifelong passion. In his young years he was a talented football player. On 1 February 1943 he was in the Italian Army and during the events of September 1943 he was taken prisoner by the Nazist troops, kept imprisoned in Teramo and then sent to Verona: he succeeded in escaping from there and reached the Italian region of Emilia-Romagna, spending with partisans the last year of war. After the war he was first in Rome and then in Trieste, where he met Matelda Colautti, who became his wife in 1952.

=== Education and academic career ===
After graduating from the liceo classico in only two years, he entered the University of Catania at the age of 16, being there from 1937 to 1939 and studying under Pia Nalli. Then he went to the university of Rome, where in 1941 he earned his laurea with magna cum laude under the direction of Mauro Picone, when he was only 19. He was immediately appointed by Picone as an assistant professor to his chair and as a researcher at the Istituto Nazionale per le Applicazioni del Calcolo, becoming his pupil. After the war he went back to Rome working with Mauro Picone: in 1948 he became "Libero Docente" (free professor) of mathematical analysis and in 1949 he was appointed as full professor at the University of Trieste. As he remembers in (Fichera 1991b, p. 14), in both cases one of the members of the judging commission was Renato Caccioppoli, which become a close friend of him. From 1956 onward he was full professor at the Sapienza University of Rome in the chair of mathematical analysis and then at the Istituto Nazionale di Alta Matematica in the chair of higher analysis, succeeding to Luigi Fantappiè. He retired from university teaching in 1992, but was professionally active until his death in 1996: particularly, as a member of the Accademia Nazionale dei Lincei and first director of the journal Rendiconti Lincei – Matematica e Applicazioni, he succeeded in reviving its reputation.

=== Honours ===
He was member of several academies, notably of the Accademia Nazionale dei Lincei, the Accademia Nazionale delle Scienze detta dei XL and of the Russian Academy of Science.

=== Teachers ===
His lifelong friendship with his teacher Mauro Picone is remembered by him in several occasions. As recalled by Colautti Fichera (2006, pp. 13–14), his father Giuseppe was an assistant professor to the chair of Picone while he was teaching at the University of Catania: they become friends and their friendship lasted even when Giuseppe was forced to leave the academic career for economic reasons, being already the father of two sons, until Giuseppe's death. The young, in effect child, Gaetano, was kept by Picone in his arms. From 1939 to 1941 the young Fichera developed his research directly under the supervision of Picone: as he remembers, it was a time of intense work. But also, when he was back from the front in April 1945 he met Picone while he was in Rome in his way back to Sicily, and his advisor was so happy to see him as a father can be seeing its living child. Another mathematician Fichera was influenced by and acknowledged as one of his teachers and inspirators was Pia Nalli: she was an outstanding analyst, teaching for several years at the University of Catania, being his teacher of mathematical analysis from 1937 to 1939. Antonio Signorini and Francesco Severi were two of Fichera's teachers of the Roman period: the first one introduced him and inspired his research in the field of linear elasticity while the second inspired his research in the field he taught him i.e. the theory of analytic functions of several complex variables. Signorini had a strong long-time friendship with Picone: on a wall of the apartment building where they lived, in Via delle Tre Madonne, 18 in Rome, a memorial tablet which commemorates the two friends is placed, as Fichera (1995b, p. 47) recalls. The two great mathematicians extended their friendship to the young Fichera, and as a consequence this led to the solution of the Signorini problem and the foundation of the theory of variational inequalities. Fichera's relations with Severi were not as friendly as with Signorini and Picone: nevertheless, Severi, which was one of the most influential Italian mathematicians of the first half of the 20th century, esteemed the young mathematician. During a course on the theory of analytic functions of several complex variables taught at the Istituto Nazionale di Alta Matematica from the fall of 1956 and the beginning of the 1957, whose lectures were collected in the book (Severi 1958), Severi posed the problem of generalizing his theorem on the Dirichlet problem for holomorphic function of several variables, as Fichera (1957, p. 707) recalls: the result was the paper (Fichera 1957), which is a masterpiece, although not generally acknowledged for various reasons described by Range (2002, pp. 6–11). Other scientists he had as teachers during the period 1939–1941 were Enrico Bompiani, Leonida Tonelli and Giuseppe Armellini: he remembered them with great respect and admiration, even if he did not share all their opinions and ideas, as Colautti Fichera (2006, p. 16) recalls.

=== Friends ===
A complete list of Fichera's friends includes some of the best scientists and mathematicians of the 20th century: Olga Oleinik, Olga Ladyzhenskaya, Israel Gel'fand, Ivan Petrovsky, Vladimir Maz'ya, Nikoloz Muskhelishvili, Ilia Vekua, Richard Courant, Fritz John, Kurt Friedrichs, Peter Lax, Louis Nirenberg, Ronald Rivlin, Hans Lewy, Clifford Truesdell, Edmund Hlawka, Ian Sneddon, Jean Leray, Alexander Weinstein, Alexander Ostrowski, Renato Caccioppoli, Solomon Mikhlin, Paul Naghdi, Marston Morse were among his friends, scientific collaborators and correspondents, just to name a few. He built up such a network of contacts being invited several times to lecture on his research by various universities and research institutions, and also participating to several academic conferences, always upon invitation. This long series of scientific journeys started in 1951, when he went to the USA together with his master and friend Mauro Picone and Bruno de Finetti in order to examine the capabilities and characteristics of the first electronic computers and purchase one for the Istituto Nazionale per le Applicazioni del Calcolo: the machine they advised to purchase was the first computer ever working in Italy. The most complete source about his friends and collaborators is the book (Colautti Fichera 2006) by his wife Matelda: in those reference it is also possible to find a fairly complete description of Gaetano Fichera's scientific journeys.

The close friendship between Angelo Pescarini and Fichera has not his roots in their scientific interests: it is another war story. As Oleinik (1997, p. 12) recalls, Gaetano, being escaped from Verona and hidden in a convent in Alfonsine, tried to get in touch with the local group of partisans in order to help the people of that town who had been so helpful with him: they were informed about an assistant professor to the chair of higher analysis in Rome who was trying to reach them. Angelo, which was a student of mathematics at the University of Bologna under Gianfranco Cimmino, a former pupil of Mauro Picone, was charged of the task of testing the truth of Gaetano's assertions, examining him in mathematics: his question was:– "Mi sai dire una condizione sufficiente per scambiare un limite con un integrale (Can you give me a sufficient condition for interchanging limit and integration)?"–. Gaetano quickly answered:– "Non solo ti darò la condizione sufficiente, ma ti darò anche la condizione necessaria e pure per insiemi non-limitati (I can give you not only a sufficient condition, but also a necessary condition, and not only for bounded domains, but also for unbounded domains)"–. In effect, Fichera proved such a theorem in the paper (Fichera 1943), his latest paper written in while he was in Rome before joining the army: from that moment on he often used to joke saying that good mathematicians can always have a good application, even for saving one's life.

One of his best friends and appreciated scientific collaborator was Olga Arsenievna Oleinik: she cured the redaction of his last posthumous paper (Fichera 1997), as Colautti Fichera (2006, pp. 202–204) recalls. Also, she used to discuss his work with Gaetano, as he did with her: sometimes their discussion become lively, but nothing more, since they were extremely good friends and estimators of each one's work.

== Work ==
=== Research activity ===
He is the author of more than 250 papers and 18 books (monographs and course notes): his work concerns mainly the fields of pure and applied mathematics listed below. A common characteristic to all of his research is the use of the methods of functional analysis to prove existence, uniqueness and approximation theorems for the various problems he studied, and also a high consideration of the analytic problems related to problems in applied mathematics.

==== Mathematical theory of elasticity ====
His work in elasticity theory includes the paper (Fichera 1961c), where Fichera proves the "Fichera's maximum principle", his work on variational inequalities. The work on this last topic started with the paper (Fichera 1963), where he announced the existence and uniqueness theorem for the Signorini problem, and ended with the following one (Fichera 1964a), where the full proof was published: those papers are the founding works of the field of variational inequalities, as remarked by Stuart Antman in (Antman 1983, pp. 282–284). Concerning the Saint-Venant's principle, he was able to prove it using a variational approach and a slight variation of a technique employed by Richard Toupin to study the same problem: in the paper (Fichera 1979a) there is a complete proof of the principle under the hypothesis that the base of the cylinder is a set with piecewise smooth boundary. Also he is known for his researches in the theory of hereditary elasticity: the paper (Fichera 1979b) emphasizes the necessity of analyzing the constitutive equations of materials with memory in order to introduce models where an existence and uniqueness theorems can be proved in such a way that the proof does not rely on an implicit choice of the topology of the function space where the problem is studied. At last, it is worth to mention that Clifford Truesdell invited him to write the contributions (Fichera 1972a) and (Fichera 1972b) for Siegfried Flügge's Handbuch der Physik.

==== Partial differential equations ====
He was one of the pioneers in the development of the abstract approach through functional analysis in order to study general boundary value problems for linear partial differential equations proving in the paper (Fichera 1955a) a theorem similar in spirit to the Lax–Milgram theorem. He studied deeply the mixed boundary value problem i.e. a boundary value problem where the boundary has to satisfy a mixed boundary condition: in his first paper on the topic, (Fichera 1949), he proves the first existence theorem for the mixed boundary problem for self-adjoint operators of n > 2 variables, while in the paper (Fichera 1955a, pp. 22–29) he proves the same theorem dropping the hypothesis of self-adjointness. He is, according to Oleinik (1997), the founder of the theory of partial differential equations of non-positive characteristics: in the paper (Fichera 1956) he introduced the now called Fichera's function, in order to identify subsets of the boundary of the domain where the boundary value problem for such kind of equations is posed, where it is necessary or not to specify the boundary condition: another account of the theory can be found in the paper (Fichera 1960), which is written in English and was later translated in Russian and Hungarian.

==== Calculus of variation ====
His contributions to the calculus of variation are mainly devoted to the proof of existence and uniqueness theorems for maxima and minima of functionals of particular form, in conjunction with his studies on variational inequalities and linear elasticity in theoretical and applied problems: in the paper (Fichera 1964a) a semicontinuity theorem for a functional introduced in the same paper is proved in order to solve the Signorini problem, and this theorem was extended in (Fichera 1964c) to the case where the given functional has general linear operators as arguments, not necessarily partial differential operators.

==== Functional analysis and eigenvalue theory ====
It is difficult to single out his contributions to functional analysis since, as stated at the beginning of this section, the methods of functional analysis are ubiquitous in his research: however, it is worth to remember paper (Fichera 1955a), where an important existence theorem is proved.

His contributions in the field of eigenvalue theory began with the paper (Fichera 1955b), where he formalizes a method developed by Mauro Picone for the approximation of eigenvalues of operators subject only to the condition that their inverse is compact: however, as he admits in (Fichera 1974a, pp. 13–14), this method does not give any estimate on the approximation error on the value of the calculated (approximated) eigenvalues.

He contributed also to the classical eigenvalue problem for symmetric operators, introducing the method of orthogonal invariants.

==== Approximation theory ====
His work in this field is mainly related to the study of systems of functions, possibly being particular solutions of a given partial differential equation or system of such equations, in order to prove their completeness on the boundary of a given domain. The interest of this research is obvious: given such a system of functions, every solution of a boundary value problem can be approximated by an infinite series or Fourier type integral in the topology of a given function space. One of the most famous examples of this kind of theorem is Mergelyan's theorem, which completely solves the problem in the class of holomorphic functions for a compact set in the complex plane. In his paper (Fichera 1948), Fichera studies this problem for harmonic functions, relaxing the smoothness requirements on the boundary in the already cited work (Fichera 1955a): a survey on his and others' work in this area, including contributions of Mauro Picone, Bernard Malgrange, Felix Browder and a number of other mathematicians, is contained in the paper (Fichera 1979c). Another branch of his studies on approximation theory is strictly tied to complex analysis in one variable, and to the already cited Mergelyan's theorem: he studied the problem of approximating continuous functions on a compact set (and analytic on its interior if this is non-void) of the complex plane by rational functions with prescribed poles, simple or not. The paper (Fichera 1974b) surveys the contribution to the solution of this and related problems by Sergey Mergelyan, Lennart Carleson, Gábor Szegő as well as others, including his own.

==== Potential theory ====
His contributions to potential theory are important. The results of his paper (Fichera 1948) occupy paragraph 24 of chapter II of the textbook (Günther 1967, pp. 108–117), as remarked by in Oleinik (1997, p. 11). Also, his researches (Fichera 1975) and (Fichera 1976) on the asymptotic behaviour of the electric field near singular points of the conducting surface, widely known among the specialists (as several works of V.G. Maz'ya, S.A. Nazarov, B.A. Plamenevsky, B.W. Schulze and others testify) can be included in between his works in potential theory.

==== Measure and integration theory ====
His main contributions to those topics and are the papers (Fichera 1943) and (Fichera 1954). In the first one he proves that a condition on a sequence of integrable functions previously introduced by Mauro Picone is both necessary and sufficient in order to assure that limit process and the integration process commute, both in bounded and unbounded domains: the theorem is similar in spirit to the dominated convergence theorem, which however only states a sufficient condition. The second paper contains an extension of the Lebesgue's decomposition theorem to finitely additive measures: this extension required him to generalize the Radon–Nikodym derivative, requiring it to be a set function belonging to a given class and minimizing a particular functional.

==== Complex analysis of functions of one and several variables ====
He contributed to both the classical topic of complex analysis in one variable and the more recent one of complex analysis in several variables. His contributions to complex analysis in one variable are essentially approximation results, well described in the survey paper (Fichera 1974b). In the field of functions of several complex variables, his contributions were outstanding, but also not generally acknowledged. Precisely, in the paper (Fichera 1957) he solved the Dirichlet problem for holomorphic function of several variables under the hypothesis that the boundary of the domain ∂Ω has a Hölder continuous normal vector (i.e. it belongs to the C^{{1,α}} class) and the Dirichlet boundary condition is a function belonging to the Sobolev space H^{1/2}(∂Ω) satisfying the weak form of the tangential Cauchy–Riemann condition, extending a previous result of Francesco Severi: this theorem and the Lewy–Kneser theorem on the local Cauchy problem for holomorphic functions of several variables, laid the foundations of the theory of CR-functions. Another important result is his proof in (Fichera 1983) of an extension of Morera's theorem to functions of several complex variables, under the hypothesis that the given function f is only locally integrable: previous proofs under more restrictive assumptions were given by Francesco Severi in (Severi 1931) and Salomon Bochner in (Bochner 1953). He also studied the properties of the real part and imaginary part of functions of several complex variables, i.e. pluriharmonic functions: starting from the paper (Amoroso 1912) he gives a trace condition analogous to the tangential Cauchy–Riemann condition for the solvability of the Dirichlet problem for pluriharmonic functions in the paper (Fichera 1982a), and generalizes a theorem of Luigi Amoroso to the complex vector space $\mathbb{C}^n \equiv \mathbb{R}^{2n}$ for n ≥ 2 complex variables in the paper (Fichera 1982b). Also he was able to prove that an integro-differential equation defined on the boundary of a smooth domain by Luigi Amoroso in his cited paper, the Amoroso integro-differential equation, is a necessary and sufficient condition for the solvability of the Dirichlet problem for pluriharmonic functions when this domain is the sphere in $\mathbb{C}^2 \equiv \mathbb{R}^4$.

==== Exterior differential forms ====
His contributions to the theory of exterior differential forms started as a war story: having read a famous memoir of Enrico Betti (where Betti numbers were introduced) just before joining the army, he used this knowledge in order to develop a theory of exterior differential forms while he was kept prisoner in Teramo jail. When he was back in Rome in 1945, he discussed his discovery with Enzo Martinelli, who informed him that the idea was already developed by mathematicians Élie Cartan and Georges de Rham. However, he continued work on this theory, contributing with several papers, and also advised all of his students to study it, despite from the fact of being an analyst, as he remarks: his main results are collected in the papers (Fichera 1961a) and (Fichera 1961b). In the first one he introduced k-measures, a concept less general than currents but easier to work with: his aim was to clarify the analytic structure of currents and to prove all relevant results of the theory i.e. the three theorems of de Rham and Hodge theorem on harmonic forms in a simpler, more analytic way. In the second one he developed an abstract Hodge theory, following the axiomatic method, proving an abstract form of Hodge theorem.

==== Numerical analysis ====
As noted in the "Functional analysis and eigenvalue theory" section, his main direct contribution to the field of numerical analysis is the introduction of the method of orthogonal invariants for the calculus of eigenvalues of symmetric operators: however, as already remarked, it is hard to find something in his works which is not related to applications. His works on partial differential equations and linear elasticity have always a constructive aim: for example, the results of paper (Fichera 1975), which deals with the asymptotic analysis of the potential, were included in the book (Fichera 1978a) and led to the definition of the Fichera corner problem as a standard benchmark problem for numerical methods. Another example of his work on quantitative problems is the interdisciplinary study (Fichera, Sneider & Wyman 1977), surveyed in (Fichera 1978b), where methods of mathematical analysis and numerical analysis are applied to a problem posed by biological sciences.

==== History of mathematics ====
his work in this field occupy all the volume (Fichera 2002). He wrote bibliographical sketches for a number of mathematicians, both teachers, friends and collaborators, including Mauro Picone, Luigi Fantappiè, Pia Nalli, Maria Adelaide Sneider, Renato Caccioppoli, Solomon Mikhlin, Francesco Tricomi, Alexander Weinstein, Aldo Ghizzetti. His historical works contain several observations against the so-called historical revisitation: the meaning of this concept is clearly stated in the paper (Fichera 1996). He identifies with the word revisitation the analysis of historical facts basing only on modern conceptions and points of view: this kind of analysis differs from the "true" historical one since it is heavily affected by the historian's point of view. The historian applying this kind of methodology to history of mathematics, and more generally to the history of science, emphasizes the sources that have led a field to its modern shape, neglecting the efforts of the pioneers.

== Selected publications ==
A selection of Gaetano Fichera's works was published respectively by the Unione Matematica Italiana and the Accademia Pontaniana in his "opere scelte" (Fichera 2004) and in the volume (Fichera 2002). These two references include most of the papers listed in this section: however, these volumes does not include his monographs and textbooks, as well as several survey papers on various topic pertaining to his fields of research.

=== Papers ===
==== Research papers ====
- Fichera, Gaetano (1943), "Intorno al passaggio al limite sotto il segno d'integrale" [On the passage to the limit under the sign of integral], Portugaliae Mathematica (in Italian), 4 (1): 1–20, MR 0009192, Zbl 0063.01364. In this article, Fichera proves a necessary and sufficient condition for the exchange of the limit and the integration operations for sequences of functions, in the spirit of Henri Lebesgue's Dominated convergence theorem (which, however states only a sufficient condition).
- Fichera, Gaetano (1948), "Teoremi di completezza sulla frontiera di un dominio per taluni sistemi di funzioni" [Completeness theorems on the boundary of a domain for certain systems of functions], Annali di Matematica Pura ed Applicata, Serie IV (in Italian), 27 (1–2): 1–28, doi:10.1007/BF02415556, MR 0029014, S2CID 122309949, Zbl 0035.34801. A classical paper in potential theory.
- Fichera, Gaetano (1949), "Analisi esistenziale per le soluzioni dei problemi al contorno misti, relativi all'equazione e ai sistemi di equazioni del secondo ordine di tipo ellittico, autoaggiunti" [Existential analysis of the solutions of mixed boundary value problems, related to second order elliptic equation and systems of equations, selfadjoint], Annali della Scuola Normale Superiore, Serie III (in Italian), 1 (1–4): 75–100, MR 0035370, Zbl 0035.18603, archived from the original on 5 June 2011. In this paper, Gaetano Fichera gives the first proofs of existence and uniqueness theorems for the mixed boundary value problem involving a general second order selfadjoint elliptic operators in fairly general domains.
- Fichera, Gaetano (1954), "Sulla derivazione delle funzioni additive d'insieme" [On the differentiation of additive set functions], Rendiconti del Seminario Matematico della Università di Padova (in Italian), 23: 366–397, MR 0064858, Zbl 0058.28302. This paper is an important contribution to measure theory: the Radon–Nikodym theorem is extended in order to include singular finitely additive measures in its range of applicability.
- Fichera, Gaetano (1955a), "Alcuni recenti sviluppi della teoria dei problemi al contorno per le equazioni alle derivate parziali lineari", in Fichera, G. (ed.), Convegno Internazionale sulle Equazioni Lineari alle Derivate Parziali – Trieste 25–28 Agosto 1954 (in Italian), Rome: Edizioni Cremonese, pp. 174–227, MR 0074665, Zbl 0068.31101. The paper Some recent developments of the theory of boundary value problems for linear partial differential equations details Fichera's approach to a general theory of boundary value problems for linear partial differential equations through a theorem similar in spirit to the Lax–Milgram theorem: as an application, the general existence and uniqueness theorems of previous paper (Fichera 1949) are proved dropping the hypothesis of self-adjointness of the linear partial differential operators considered.
- Fichera, Gaetano (1955b), "Su un metodo del Picone per il calcolo degli autovalori e delle autosoluzioni" [On a method of Picone for the calculus of eigenvalues and eigensolutions], Annali di Matematica Pura ed Applicata, 4 (in Italian), 40 (1): 239–259, doi:10.1007/BF02416536, MR 0075569, S2CID 119998735, Zbl 0065.35501.
- Fichera, Gaetano (1956), "Sulle equazioni differenziali lineari ellittico-paraboliche del secondo ordine" [On linear elliptic-parabolic equations of second order], Atti della Accademia Nazionale dei Lincei. Memorie. Classe di Scienze Fisiche, Matematiche e Naturali, Serie VIII (in Italian), 5 (1): 1–30, MR 0089348, Zbl 0075.28102. This is the first paper on the theory of partial differential equations of non-positive characteristics: the Fichera's function is introduced and its applications to the boundary value problems for this class of operators is detailed. Also the well posedness of the problem is considered.
- Fichera, Gaetano (1957), "Caratterizzazione della traccia, sulla frontiera di un campo, di una funzione analitica di più variabili complesse" [Characterization of the trace, on the boundary of a domain, of an analytic function of several complex variables], Atti della Accademia Nazionale dei Lincei. Rendiconti. Classe di Scienze Fisiche, Matematiche e Naturali, VIII (in Italian), 22 (6): 706–715, MR 0093597, Zbl 0106.05202. This is an epoch-making paper in the theory of CR-functions, where the Dirichlet problem for analytic functions of several complex variables is solved for general data.
- Fichera, Gaetano (1961a), "Spazi lineari di k–misure e di forme differenziali", Proceedings of the Symposium on Linear Spaces, Jerusalem, 1960 (in Italian), Jerusalem / Oxford: Jerusalem Academic Press / Pergamon Press, pp. 175–226, MR 0133434, Zbl 0126.17801. "Linear spaces of k–measures and differential forms" (English translation of the title) is perhaps the most important contribution of Gaetano Fichera to the theory of exterior differential forms: he introduces the k–measures and shows that, despite being less general than currents and thus being easier to work with, they can be used to prove all the most important results of the theory.
- Fichera, Gaetano (1960), "On a unified theory of boundary value problems for elliptic-parabolic equations of second order", in Langer, Rudolph E. (ed.), Boundary Problems in Differential Equations, Madison: The University of Wisconsin Press, pp. 97–120, hdl:2027/uc1.b3805516, MR 0111931, Zbl 0122.33504. A paper about the boundary value problem for partial differential equations of non-positive characteristics, where the Fichera's function is introduced and its application are described.
- Fichera, Gaetano (1961b), "Teoria assiomatica delle forme armoniche" [Axiomatic theory of harmonic forms], Rendiconti di Matematica e delle sue Applicazioni, 5 (in Italian), 20: 147–171, MR 0140124, Zbl 0116.07601. In this a work, an abstract theory of harmonic forms in Hilbert spaces is presented, and a proof of Hodge theorem is given.
- Fichera, Gaetano (1961c), "Il teorema del massimo modulo per l'equazione dell'elastostatica tridimensionale" [The maximum modulus theorem for the three-dimensional elastostatic equation], Archive for Rational Mechanics and Analysis (in Italian), 7 (5): 373–387, Bibcode:1961ArRMA...7..373F, doi:10.1007/BF00250770, S2CID 120725925, Zbl 0100.30801. This is the article where the now called "Fichera maximum principle" is proved.
- Fichera, Gaetano (1963), "Sul problema elastostatico di Signorini con ambigue condizioni al contorno" [On the elastostatic problem of Signorini with ambiguous boundary conditions], Atti della Accademia Nazionale dei Lincei. Rendiconti. Classe di Scienze Fisiche, Matematiche e Naturali, Serie VIII (in Italian), 34 (2): 138–142, MR 0176661, Zbl 0128.18305. A research announcement describing briefly (and without proofs) Gaetano Fichera's solution to the Signorini problem.
- Fichera, Gaetano (1964a), "Problemi elastostatici con vincoli unilaterali: il problema di Signorini con ambigue condizioni al contorno", Atti della Accademia Nazionale dei Lincei. Memorie. Classe di Scienze Fisiche, Matematiche e Naturali, Serie VIII (in Italian), 7 (2): 91–140, Zbl 0146.21204. An ample memoir containing the detailed proofs of existence and uniqueness theorem for the Signorini problem, translated in the English language as Fichera, Gaetano (1964b), "Elastostatic problems with unilateral constraints: the Signorini problem with ambiguous boundary conditions", Seminari dell'istituto Nazionale di Alta Matematica 1962–1963, Rome: Edizioni Cremonese, pp. 613–679.
- Fichera, Gaetano (1964c), "Semicontinuity of multiple integrals in ordinary form", Archive for Rational Mechanics and Analysis, 17 (5): 339–352, Bibcode:1964ArRMA..17..339F, doi:10.1007/BF00250470, S2CID 119935181, Zbl 0128.10003. In this paper Gaetano Fichera proves a semicontinuity theorem for functionals depending on a general linear operator, not necessarily being a partial differential operator.
- Fichera, Gaetano (1972a), "Existence theorems in elasticity", in Flügge, Siegfried; Truesdell, Clifford A. (eds.), Festkörpermechanik/Mechanics of Solids, Handbuch der Physik (Encyclopedia of Physics), vol. 2, Berlin–Heidelberg–New York: Springer-Verlag, pp. 347–389, ISBN 3-540-13161-2, Zbl 0277.73001, ISBN 0-387-13161-2. The encyclopedic entry written by Fichera on existence problems in linear elasticity for the Handbuch der Physik on invitation by Clifford Truesdell.
- Fichera, Gaetano (1972b), "Boundary value problems of elasticity with unilateral constraints", in Flügge, Siegfried; Truesdell, Clifford A. (eds.), Festkörpermechanik/Mechanics of Solids, Handbuch der Physik (Encyclopedia of Physics), vol. 2 (paperback 1984 ed.), Berlin–Heidelberg–New York: Springer-Verlag, pp. 391–424, ISBN 3-540-13161-2, Zbl 0277.73001, ISBN 0-387-13161-2. The encyclopedic entry written by Fichera on problems with unilateral constraints (the class of boundary value problems the Signorini problem belongs to) for the Handbuch der Physik on invitation by Clifford Truesdell.
- Fichera, Gaetano (1975), "Comportamento asintotico del campo elettrico e della densità elettrica in prossimità dei punti singolari della superficie conduttore" [Asymptotic behavior of the electric field and density of the electric charge in the neighborhood of singular points of a conducting surface], Rendiconti del Seminario Matematico Università e Politecnico di Torino (in Italian), 32 (1973–74): 111–143, Zbl 0318.35007. This is an important paper on the asymptotic analysis of the electric field near the vertex of a conical conducting surface. There exists also a freely consultable Russian translation, Асимптотическое поведение электрического поля и плотности электрического заряда в окрестности сингулярных точек проводящей поверхности, Uspekhi Matematicheskikh Nauk (in Russian), 30 (3(183)): 105–124, 1975, MR 0388978, Zbl 0318.35007.
- Fichera, Gaetano (1976), "Asymptotic behaviour of the electric field near the singular points of the conductor surface", Rendiconti della Accademia Nazionale dei Lincei, Classe di Scienze Fisiche, Matematiche e Naturali, 8, 60 (1): 13–20, MR 0489373, Zbl 0364.35004.
- Fichera, Gaetano; Sneider, Maria A.; Wyman, Jeffreys (1977), "On the existence of a steady state in a biological system", Atti della Accademia Nazionale dei Lincei. Memorie. Classe di Scienze Fisiche, Matematiche e Naturali, Serie VII, Sezione III, XIV (1): 1–26. A work presenting a complete interdisciplinary analysis of the stability of a system of ordinary differential equations containing a large number of parameters, modeling a biological system: the results presented here were later surveyed in the paper (Fichera 1978b).
- Fichera, Gaetano; Sneider, Maria Adelaide; Wyman, Jeffreys (1977a), "On the existence of a steady state in a biological system", PNAS, 74 (10): 4182–4184, Bibcode:1977PNAS...74.4182F, doi:10.1073/pnas.74.10.4182, PMC 431902, PMID 270662. A short research announcement reporting the results detailed in (Fichera, Sneider & Wyman 1977).
- Fichera, Gaetano (1978b), "Un problema di analisi matematica proposto dalla biologia" [A problem in mathematical analysis proposed by biology], Rendiconti di Matematica, 6 (in Italian), 10 (4): 1–6, MR 0503945, Zbl 0378.34039. This is a survey paper on an interdisciplinary research conducted by him, Maria Adelaide Sneider and Jeffries Wyman, on the existence of a steady state in a biological system: the research results were previously published as (Fichera, Sneider & Wyman 1977).
- Fichera, Gaetano (1979a), "Remarks on Saint-Venant's principle", Rendiconti di Matematica e delle sue Applicazioni, Serie 6, 12 (2): 181–200, MR 0557661, Zbl 0443.73002. A paper containing a mathematical proof of the Saint-Venant's principle.
- Fichera, Gaetano (1979b), "Avere una memoria tenace crea gravi problem", Archive for Rational Mechanics and Analysis (in Italian), 70 (2): 373–387, Bibcode:1979ArRMA..70..373., doi:10.1007/BF00281161, MR 1553577, S2CID 189788538, Zbl 0425.73002. "Having a tenacious memory creates serious problems" (English translation of the title) is a well known work on the fading memory principle and on the consequences implied by its not careful adoption.
- Fichera, Gaetano (1979c), "The problem of the completeness of systems of particular solutions of partial differential equations", in Ansorge, R.; Glashoff, K.; Werner, B. (eds.), Numerical mathematics, Symposium on the Occasion of Retirement of Lothar Collatz, Hamburg 1979, International Series of Numerical Mathematics, vol. 49, Basel: Birkhäuser-Verlag, pp. 25–41, Zbl 0434.35010.
- Fichera, Gaetano (1982a), "Problemi al contorno per le funzioni pluriarmoniche", Atti del Convegno celebrativo dell'80° anniversario della nascita di Renato Calapso, Messina–Taormina, 1–4 aprile 1981 (in Italian), Rome: Libreria Eredi Virgilio Veschi, pp. 127–152, MR 0698973, Zbl 0958.32504. In the work "Boundary value problems for pluriharmonic functions" (English translation of the title) a trace condition for pluriharmonic functions is proved.
- Fichera, Gaetano (1982b), "Valori al contorno delle funzioni pluriarmoniche: estensione allo spazio R^{2n} di un teorema di L. Amoroso" [Boundary values of pluriharmonic functions: extension to the space R^{2n} of a theorem of L. Amoroso], Rendiconti del Seminario Matematico e Fisico di Milano (in Italian), 52 (1): 23–34, doi:10.1007/BF02924996, MR 0802991, S2CID 122147246, Zbl 0569.31006.
- Fichera, Gaetano (1982c), "Su un teorema di L. Amoroso nella teoria delle funzioni analitiche di due variabili complesse" [On a theorem of L. Amoroso in the theory of analytic functions of two complex variables], Revue Roumaine de Mathématiques Pures et Appliquées (in Italian), 27: 327–333, MR 0669481, Zbl 0509.31007. In this paper, it is proved that a necessary and sufficient condition for a harmonic function defined on a ball in $\mathbb{C}^2$ to be pluriharmonic is to satisfy the Amoroso integral equation.
- Fichera, Gaetano (1983), "Sul teorema di Cauchy–Morera per le funzioni analitiche di più variabili complesse" [On the theorem of Cauchy–Morera for analytic functions of several complex variables], Atti della Accademia Nazionale dei Lincei. Rendiconti. Classe di Scienze Fisiche, Matematiche e Naturali, Series VIII (in Italian), 74 (6): 336–350, MR 0756714, Zbl 0573.32005. In this article, Morera's theorem for analytic functions of several complex variables is proved under the sole hypothesis of local integrability for the given function f.
- Fichera, Gaetano (1986), "Unification of global and local existence theorems for holomorphic functions of several complex variables", Atti della Accademia Nazionale dei Lincei. Memorie. Classe di Scienze Fisiche, Matematiche e Naturali, Serie VIII, 18 (3): 61–83, MR 0917525, Zbl 0705.32006. A paper describing the ideas of (Fichera 1957), giving some extensions of those ideas and a solution for a particular Cauchy problem for holomorphic functions of several variables.
- Fichera, Gaetano (1997), "A boundary value problem connected with response of semi-space to a short laser pulse", Atti della Accademia Nazionale dei Lincei, Rendiconti Lincei, Matematica e Applicazioni, Serie IX, 8 (4): 197–228, MR 1611621, Zbl 0903.35034. Gaetano Fichera last, postumhous scientific paper, prepared for the publication by Olga Arsenievna Oleinik and his wife.
- Fichera, Gaetano (2004), Opere scelte [Selected works] (in Italian, English, German, and French), Florence: Edizioni Cremonese (distributed by Unione Matematica Italiana), pp. XXIX+432 (vol. 1), pp. VI+570 (vol. 2), pp. VI+583 (vol. 3) ISBN 88-7083-811-0 (vol. 1), ISBN 88-7083-812-9 (vol. 2), ISBN 88-7083-813-7 (vol. 3). Three volumes collecting the most important mathematical papers of Gaetano Fichera in their original language and typographical form, including a biographical sketch of Olga A. Oleinik

==== Historical and survey papers ====
- Fichera, Gaetano (1950), "Risultati concernenti la risoluzione delle equazioni funzionali lineari dovuti all'Istituto Nazionale per le applicazioni del calcolo" [Results concerning the solutions of linear functional equations due to the National Institute for Calculus Applications], Atti della Accademia Nazionale dei Lincei. Memorie. Classe di Scienze Fisiche, Matematiche e Naturali, Serie VIII (in Italian), 3 (1): 1–81, MR 0036409, Zbl 0066.09902. An ample survey paper on results on the solutions of linear integral and partial differential equation obtained by the research team of Mauro Picone at the Istituto Nazionale per le Applicazioni del Calcolo, by using methods from functional analysis.
- Fichera, Gaetano (1974b), "On the approximation of analytic functions by rational functions", Journal of Mathematical and Physical Sciences, 8 (1), Madras: 7–19, Zbl 0294.30034. A survey paper about the theory of approximation of and by analytic functions of a complex variable.
- Fichera, Gaetano (1978), "Il contributo femminile al progresso della matematica" [Women's contribution to the advancement of mathematics], Memorie e Rendiconti della Accademia di Scienze, Lettere e Belle Arti Degli Zelanti e dei Dafnici, Serie II (in Italian), VIII: 41–58.
- Fichera, Gaetano (January–April 1979), "Il contributo italiano alla teoria matematica dell'elasticità" [The Italian contribution to the mathematical theory of elasticity], Rendiconti del Circolo Matematico di Palermo, Serie II (in Italian), XXVIII (1): 5–26, doi:10.1007/BF02849579, MR 0564544, S2CID 122003599, Zbl 0433.73002. The address of Gaetano Fichera given on the occasion of the conferment of the laurea honoris causa in civil engineering: he describes the history of the theory of elasticity particularly detailing the contributions of Italian mathematicians and engineers.
- Fichera, Gaetano (1981), "Alexander Weinstein", Atti della Accademia Nazionale dei Lincei. Rendiconti. Classe di Scienze Fisiche, Matematiche e Naturali, Serie VIII (in Italian), 70 (5): 233–240, Zbl 0504.01031.
- Fichera, Gaetano (1982d), "I contributi di Guido Fubini e di Francesco Severi alla teoria delle funzioni di più variabili complesse", Atti del convegno matematico in celebrazione del centenario nascita di Guido Fubini e Francesco Severi. Turin, 8–10 Ottobre 1979, Atti dell'Accademia delle Scienze di Torino. I. Classe di Scienze Fisiche, Matematiche e Naturali, Supplemento, vol. 115, Turin: Accademia delle Scienze di Torino, pp. 23–44, ISSN 0001-4419, MR 0727484, Zbl 0531.32001. In the paper "The contributions of Guido Fubini and Francesco Severi to the theory of functions of several complex variables" (English translation of the title), Gaetano Fichera describes the main contributions of the two scientists to the Cauchy and the Dirichlet problem for holomorphic functions of several complex variables, as well as the impact of their work on subsequent researches.
- Fichera, Gaetano (1991a), "I teoremi di Severi e Severi-Kneser per le funzioni analitiche più variabili complesse e loro ulteriori sviluppi", Recenti sviluppi in analisi matematica e sue applicazioni. Atti del convegno internazionale dedicato al Prof. G. Aquaro in occasione del suo 70° compleanno, Conferenze del Seminario di Matematica dell'Università di Bari (in Italian), Bari: Laterza, pp. 13–25, MR 1185553, Zbl 0836.32001. "The Severi an Severi–Kneser theorems for analytic functions of several complex variables and their further developments" (English translation of the title) is an historical survey paper on the Cauchy and the Dirichlet problem for holomorphic functions of several complex variables, updating the earlier work (Fichera 1982d).
- Fichera, Gaetano (1991b), "Ricordo di Renato Caccioppoli" [Recollection of Renato Caccioppoli], Ricerche di Matematica (in Italian), 40 (supplement): 11–15, Zbl 0788.01051. Some recollections of his close friend Renato Caccioppoli.
- Fichera, Gaetano (1993), "Il calcolo infinitesimale alle soglie del Duemila" [Infinitesimal calculus at the threshold to the year 2000], Atti della Accademia Nazionale dei Lincei. Classe di Scienze Fisiche, Matematiche e Naturali. Rendiconti Lincei. Supplemento, Serie IX, 4 (1): 69–86, MR 1286793, Zbl 0876.01032. A survey paper describing the development of infinitesimal calculus during the twentieth century and trying to trace possible scenarios for its future evolution.
- Fichera, Gaetano (1995a), "L'ultima lezione" [The last lesson], Rendiconti della Accademia Nazionale delle Scienze Detta dei XL, Memorie di Matematica e Applicazioni (in Italian), 19 (1): 1–24, MR 1387547, archived from the original (PDF) on 26 July 2011. Fichera's "last lesson" of the course of higher analysis, given on the occasion of his retirement from university teaching in 1992.
- Fichera, Gaetano (1995b), "La nascita della teoria delle disequazioni variazionali ricordata dopo trent'anni", Incontro scientifico italo-spagnolo. Roma, 21 ottobre 1993, Atti dei Convegni Lincei (in Italian), vol. 114, Rome: Accademia Nazionale dei Lincei, pp. 47–53, archived from the original on 23 February 2012. The birth of the theory of variational inequalities remembered thirty years later (English translation of the title) tell the story of the beginning of the theory of variational inequalities from the point of view of its founder.
- Fichera, Gaetano (1996), "Rivisitazione e storia due aspetti contrastanti della storiografia scientifica", in Tarozzi, Gino (ed.), Convegno "Giuseppe Geminiani", Cesena 16–19 October 1995 (in Italian), Cesena–Urbino. "Revisiting and history: two conflicting aspects of scientific historiography" details its author's opinions about the way of doing historical researches on mathematical topics.
- Fichera, Gaetano (1999), "L'analisi matematica in Italia fra le due guerre" [Mathematical analysis in Italy between the two wars], Atti della Accademia Nazionale dei Lincei, Rendiconti Lincei, Matematica e Applicazioni, IX (in Italian), 10 (4): 279–312, MR 1767935, Zbl 1026.01013.
- Fichera, Gaetano (2002), Opere storiche biografiche, divulgative, Naples: Giannini / Società Nazionale di Scienze, Lettere e Arti in Napoli, p. 491. Gaetano Fichera's "Historical, biographical, expository works": a volume collecting his contributions in the original language (English or Italian) to the fields of history of mathematics and scientific expository work.

=== Monographs and textbooks ===
- Fichera, Gaetano (1962) [1954], Lezioni sulle trasformazioni lineari. Volume I: Introduzione all'analisi lineare (in Italian) (3rd reprint ed.), Rome: Libreria Eredi Virgilio Veschi, pp. XIX+502, MR 0067346, Zbl 0057.33601: for a review of the book, see Ghizzetti, Aldo (1954), "G. Fichera, Lezioni sulle trasformazioni lineari, Vol. I: Introduzione all'Analisi lineare, Istituto Matematico dell'Università di Trieste, 1954 – pag. XVII + 502.", Bollettino dell'Unione Matematica Italiana, Serie 3 (in Italian), 9 (4): 457–459.
- Fichera, Gaetano (1958), Premesse ad una teoria generale dei problemi al contorno per le equazioni differenziali [Premises to a general theory of boundary value problems for differential equations], Corsi dell'Istituto Nazionale di Alta Matematica (in Italian), Lezioni redatte dai Dott. Lucilla Bassotti e Luciano De Vito, Rome: Libreria Eredi Virgilio Veschi, pp. III+292. A monograph based on the lecture notes, taken by Lucilla Bassotti and Luciano De Vito of a course held by Gaetano Fichera at the INdAM: for a review of the book, see Miranda, Carlo (1959), "G. Fichera, Premesse ad una teoria generale dei problemi al contorno per le equazioni differenziali, Libreria Eredi V., Roma", Bollettino dell'Unione Matematica Italiana, Serie 3 (in Italian), 14 (4): 568–570.
- Fichera, Gaetano (1974a), "Metodi e risultati concernenti l'analisi numerica e quantitativa" [Methods and results concerning numerical and quantitative analysis], Atti della Accademia Nazionale dei Lincei. Memorie. Classe di Scienze Fisiche, Matematiche e Naturali, Serie VIII (in Italian), 12 (1): 1–202, MR 0639162, Zbl 0334.65002. An extensive survey on some results of numerical analysis (especially on numerical calculation of eigenvalues) and associated results of mathematical analysis obtained by Gaetano Fichera and his school: its updated English translation is the book (Fichera 1978a).
- Fichera, Gaetano (1978a), Numerical and quantitative analysis. Translated from Italian by Sandro Graffi, Surveys and Reference Works in Mathematics, vol. 3, London–San Francisco–Melbourne: Pitman Publishing, pp. x+208, ISBN 0-273-00284-8, MR 0519677, Zbl 0384.65043. An English updated translation of the memoir (Fichera 1974a).
- Fichera, Gaetano (1985), Problemi analitici nuovi nella fisica matematica classica [New analytical problems in classical mathematical physics], Quaderni del Consiglio Nazionale delle Ricerche–Gruppo Nazionale di Fisica Matematica (in Italian), vol. 9, Istituto Anselmi, on behalf of CNR, pp. II+147, MR 0848130.

== See also ==
- Constitutive equations
- Fichera corner problem
- Mauro Picone
- Potential theory
- Saint-Venant's principle
- Signorini problem
- Variational inequality
