= Michele de Franchis =

Italian mathematician

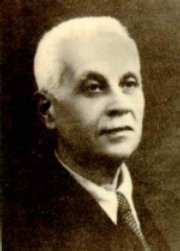
- Michele De Franchis
- Born: April 6, 1875; Palermo, Italy
- Died: February 19, 1946 (aged 70); Palermo, Italy
- Education: University of Palermo
- Scientific career
- Fields: Mathematics
- Workplaces: University of Cagliari; University of Parma; University of Catania

Michele de Franchis (6 April 1875, Palermo – 19 February 1946, Palermo) was an Italian mathematician, specializing in algebraic geometry. He is known for the De Franchis theorem and the Castelnuovo–de Franchis theorem.

He received his laurea in 1896 from the University of Palermo, where he was taught by Giovanni Battista Guccia and Francesco Gerbaldi. De Franchis was appointed in 1905 Professor of Algebra and Analytic Geometry at the University of Cagliari and then in 1906 moved to the University of Parma, where he was appointed professor of Projective and Descriptive Geometry and remained until 1909. From 1909 to 1914 he was a professor at the University of Catania. In 1914, upon the death of Guccia, he was appointed as Guccia's successor in the chair Analytic and Projective Geometry at the University of Palermo.

In 1909 Michele de Franchis and Giuseppe Bagnera were awarded the Prix Bordin of the Académie des Sciences of Paris for their work on hyperelliptic surfaces. De Franchis and Bagnera were Invited Speakers at the ICM in 1908 in Rome.

Among de Franchis's students are Margherita Beloch, Maria Ales, and Antonino Lo Voi.

De Franchis's works (after a few early papers devoted to the classification of linear systems on plane curves) are essentially concerned with the study of irregular surfaces, a central subject for the Italian school, with its many related topics (correspondences on curves, cyclic coverings, bundles of holomorphic forms). ... De Franchis introduced and used implicitly some of the most important tools of modern algebraic geometry, such as characteristic classes and the Albanese map. ... de Franchis's approach for the classification of hyperelliptic surfaces set the pattern for Lefschetz's works on general abelian varieties. Some of de Franchis's results seem to suggest still future extensions which can reveal themselves to be useful for modern algebraic geometry.
