= Monod–Wyman–Changeux model =

Biochemical model of protein transitions

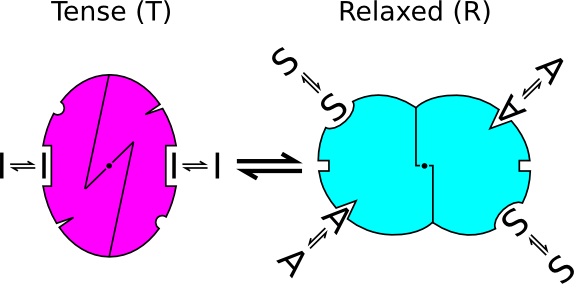
An allosteric transition of a protein between R and T states, stabilised by an Agonist, an Inhibitor and a Substrate.

In biochemistry, the Monod–Wyman–Changeux model (MWC model, also known as the symmetry model or concerted model) describes allosteric transitions of proteins made up of identical subunits. It was proposed by Jean-Pierre Changeux in his PhD thesis, and described by Jacques Monod, Jeffries Wyman, and Jean-Pierre Changeux. It contrasts with the sequential model and substrate presentation.

The concept of two distinct symmetric states is the central postulate of the MWC model. The main idea is that regulated proteins, such as many enzymes and receptors, exist in different interconvertible states in the absence of any regulator. The ratio of the different conformational states is determined by thermal equilibrium. This model is defined by the following rules:

1. An allosteric protein is an oligomer of protomers that are symmetrically related (for hemoglobin, we shall assume, for the sake of algebraic simplicity, that all four subunits are functionally identical).
2. Each protomer can exist in (at least) two conformational states, designated T and R; these states are in equilibrium whether or not ligand is bound to the oligomer.
3. The ligand can bind to a protomer in either conformation. Only the conformational change alters the affinity of a protomer for the ligand. The regulators merely shift the equilibrium toward one state or another. For instance, an agonist will stabilize the active form of a pharmacological receptor. Phenomenologically, it looks as if the agonist provokes the conformational transition. One crucial feature of the model is the dissociation between the binding function (the fraction of protein bound to the regulator), and the state function (the fraction of protein under the activated state), cf below. In the models said of "induced-fit", those functions are identical.

In the historical model, each allosteric unit, called a protomer (generally assumed to be a subunit), can exist in two different conformational states – designated 'R' (for relaxed) or 'T' (for tense) states. In any one molecule, all protomers must be in the same state. That is to say, all subunits must be in either the R or the T state. Proteins with subunits in different states are not allowed by this model. The R state has a higher affinity for the ligand than the T state. Because of that, although the ligand may bind to the subunit when it is in either state, the binding of a ligand will increase the equilibrium in favor of the R state.

Two equations can be derived, that express the fractional occupancy of the ligand binding site ($\bar{Y}$) and the fraction of the proteins in the R state ($\bar{R}$):

$$\bar{Y} = \frac{L c\alpha \cdot (1+c \alpha)^{n-1}+\alpha \cdot(1+\alpha)^{n-1}}{(1+\alpha)^n+L \cdot (1+c\alpha)^n}$$

$$\bar{R} = \frac{(1+\alpha)^n}{(1+\alpha)^n+L \cdot (1+c\alpha)^n}$$

Where $L = [T]_0/[R]_0$ is the allosteric constant, that is the ratio of proteins in the T and R states in the absence of ligand, $c=K_R/K_T$ is the ratio of the affinities of R and T states for the ligand, and $\alpha=[X]/K_R$, the normalized concentration of ligand. It is not immediately obvious that the expression for $\bar{Y}$ is a form of the Adair equation, but in fact it is, as one can see by multiplying out the expressions in parentheses and comparing the coefficients of powers of $\alpha$ with corresponding $K$ coefficients in the Adair equation.

This model explains sigmoidal binding properties (i.e. positive cooperativity) as change in concentration of ligand over a small range will lead to a large increase in the proportion of molecules in the R state, and thus will lead to a high association of the ligand to the protein. It cannot explain negative cooperativity.

The MWC model proved very popular in enzymology, and pharmacology, although it has been shown inappropriate in a certain number of cases. The best example of a successful application of the model is the regulation of hemoglobin function. Extensions of the model have been proposed for lattices of proteins by various authors. Edelstein argued that the MWC model gave a better account of the data for hemoglobin than the sequential model could do. He and Changeux applied the model to signal transduction. Changeux has discussed the status of the model after 50 years.

== See also ==
- Sequential model
