= Antoine Danchin =

French geneticist (born 1944)

- Born: 7 May 1944 (age 82)
- Education: École Normale Supérieure; Institut Henri Poincaré; Institut de biologie physico-chimique
- Scientific career
- Fields: Bioinformatics
- Workplaces: Institut de biologie physico-chimique École polytechnique Pasteur Institute; University of Hong Kong
- Website: www.normalesup.org/~adanchin/

Antoine Danchin (born 7 May 1944) is a French geneticist. He is best known for his research in several fields of biology, from the structure and function of adenylate cyclase, to modelling of learning in the nervous system and the early development of genomics and bioinformatics. He is the chairman of the startup AMAbiotics which specialises in metabolic bioremediation and synthetic biology. He was the director of the Department Genomes and Genetics at the Pasteur Institute in Paris where he headed the Genetics of Bacterial Genomes Unit.

== Early life and career ==
He was trained as a mathematician at the Institut Henri Poincaré and a physicist at the École Normale Supérieure. Working first with Mildred Cohn, Marianne Grunberg-Manago and Ionel Solomon in nuclear magnetic resonance, Danchin became an experimental microbiologist in the early seventies. He created with Philippe Courrège and Jean-Pierre Changeux at the Institut de biologie physico-chimique in Paris, France, a working seminar where they worked together on the construction of mathematical models of learning and memory.

Interested in University training he created, with Maurice Guéron, the first semester of Biology at the École polytechnique, and developed his teaching during four years. Among his first students one can find Daniel Kahn, Patrick Charnay, and many others. The main goal of his research has been to try to understand how genes can function collectively in the cell. This led him to work on regulation systems which control global gene expression in bacteria. Part of his work was devoted to the study of the enzymes that synthesize cyclic AMP. He established the reference classification of adenylate cyclases after his laboratory successfully cloned and sequenced the genes of adenylyl cyclase toxins from the whooping cough agent as well as from the agent of anthrax. This work led him to trigger ethical reflections on the practices of molecular genetics and genomics at a time when this was not considered important.

Danchin started in 1985 a collaboration with computer scientists for evaluation of artificial intelligence techniques to the study of integrated problems in molecular genetics. This convinced him that it was time to investigate genomes as wholes, provided that an important effort in computer sciences was initiated in parallel (in silico biology). Early in 1987 he proposed that a sequencing program should be undertaken for Bacillus subtilis. This proposal was actualized by a European joint effort on this genome, starting in 1988. The complete sequence was published in 1997. The first significant and unexpected discovery of this work was, in 1991, that many genes (at the time, half of the genes) were of completely unknown function. This led him to try to organize bioinformatics in France with the help of several colleagues at universities, CNRS and INRIA, through the creation of a nationwide group, GDR 1029 (1991–1995) and subsequently through the coordination of the bioinformatics programme of the Groupement de Recherche et d'Etudes des Genomes (1992–1996), then at the Comité de Coordination des Sciences du Vivant (1998–2000). Re-sequencing and re-annotation of the B. subtilis genome was completed in 2009 to update the sequence and annotation of this reference genome.

In year 2000, Danchin created the HKU-Pasteur Research Centre in Hong Kong, meant to develop microbial genomics in the region, with the help of the Innovation and Technology Commission of the Hong Kong SAR government to develop bioinformatics (programme Biosupport).

Danchin is now developing theoretical reflections and experiments in the domain of synthetic biology, trying to make explicit the idea that cells behave as computers (Turing machines) making computers. Together with Victor de Lorenzo, he created the free and open access journal Symplectic Biology, devoted to publishing innovative ideas in systems and synthetic biology.

== Personal life ==
Antoine Danchin is the father of Raphael Danchin.

== Selected works ==
- The Delphic Boat: What Genomes Tell Us, Translated by Alison Quayle, Harvard University Press, 2003.
