= Pia Nalli =

Italian mathematician (1886–1964)

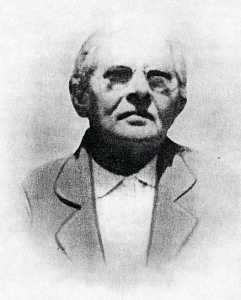
- Pia Nalli
- Born: 10 February 1886; Palermo
- Died: 27 September 1964 (aged 78); Catania
- Education: University of Palermo
- Scientific career
- Fields: Functional analysis; Theory of the integral; Tensor calculus
- Workplaces: University of Cagliari; University of Catania
- Theses: Riduzione di un fascio di curve piane di genere uno, corrispondente a sé stesso in una trasformazione birazionale involutoria del piano (1911); Esposizione e confronto critico delle diverse definizioni proposte per l'integrale definito (1914)
- Doctoral advisor: Giuseppe Bagnera
- Notable students: Gaetano Fichera

Pia Maria Nalli (10 February 1886 – 27 September 1964) was an Italian mathematician known for her work on the summability of Fourier series, on Morera's theorem for analytic functions of several variables and for finding the solution to the Fredholm integral equation of the third kind for the first time. Her research interests ranged from algebraic geometry to functional analysis and tensor analysis; she was a speaker at the 1928 International Congress of Mathematicians.

She is also remembered for her struggles against discrimination against women in the Italian university hiring system. A street in Rome is named after her.

== Life and academic career ==
=== Early life and education ===
Nalli was born on February 10, 1886, in Palermo, to a middle-class family with seven children. She studied at the University of Palermo, where she obtained a laurea in 1910 under the supervision of Giuseppe Bagnera, with a thesis concerning algebraic geometry, and in the same year joined the Circolo Matematico di Palermo.

After finishing her studies, Nalli assisted Bagnera in Palermo in 1911 and then began working as a school teacher. She completed a habilitation thesis in 1914 on the theory of integrals, and continued to work on Fourier analysis and Dirichlet series for the next several years.

=== Academic career ===
Nalli served as assistant to Giuseppe Bagnera at the University of Palermo from 1 April 1911 to 16 November 1911. She then taught at a number of secondary schools, first in the girls' school at Avellino, then in Trapani, and from 16 November 1912 in the girls' technical school in Palermo. During this time Nalli continued her research, completing her thesis "Esposizione e confronto critico delle diverse definizioni proposte per l'integrale definito di una funzione limitata o no", a study of the theory of the integral based on recent work on the subject by Émile Borel, Henri Lebesgue Charles de la Vallée Poussin, Giuseppe Vitali and Arnaud Denjoy.

In 1921, Nalli became extraordinary professor at the University of Cagliari. She had been ranked second to Mauro Picone in the competition for the position, possibly in part because she was female, but Picone chose to stay at the University of Catania and become head of mathematics there, so the Cagliari position fell to Nalli. In 1923, she was listed first in a search for a position at the University of Pavia, but not offered the position. Finally, after similar mistreatment from several other universities, she moved to the University of Catania as a full professor in 1927. At around this time, perhaps encouraged by Tullio Levi-Civita, she switched her research focus from functional analysis to tensor calculus.

She was an invited speaker at the International Congress of Mathematicians in 1928.

=== Death and legacy ===
Nalli died on 27 September 1964, in Catania. A street in Rome, the Via Pia Nalli, is named after her.

== Selected works ==
Pia Nalli published 61 mathematical works, including the monograph (Nalli 1914) and a textbook. Her "Selected works" (Nalli 1976) include this monograph plus eleven articles on topics mainly belonging to functional and mathematical analysis: the following list includes also her doctoral thesis (Nalli 1911) and other works on tensor calculus

- Nalli, Pia (1911), "Riduzione di un fascio di curve piane di genere uno, corrispondente a sé stesso in una trasformazione birazionale involutoria del piano" [Reduction of a bundle of genus one planar curves, corresponding to itself in a birational involutive transformation of the plane], Rendiconti del Circolo Matematico di Palermo (in Italian), 31 (1): 92–108, doi:10.1007/BF03018796, JFM 42.0604.02, S2CID 122170638.
- Nalli, Pia (1914), Esposizione e confronto critico delle diverse definizioni proposte per l'integrale definito di una funzione limitata o no [Exposition and critical comparison of the different definitions proposed for the definite integral of a bounded or not function] (in Italian), Palermo: Stabilimento tipografico Virzì, p. 163, JFM 45.1282.01.
- Nalli, Pia (1922), "Sulle operazioni funzionali lineari" [On linear functional operations], Rendiconti del Circolo Matematico di Palermo (in Italian), 46 (1): 49–90, doi:10.1007/BF03018259, JFM 48.1247.01, S2CID 121029135.
- Nalli, Pia (1928), "Sulla metrica superficiale di una varietà" [On the surface metric of a manifold], Rendiconti del Circolo Matematico di Palermo (in Italian), 52 (1): 260–264, doi:10.1007/BF03016619, JFM 54.0769.01, S2CID 122204340.
- Nalli, Pia (1937), "Trasporti rigidi di vettori nelle varietà metriche" [Rigid transport of vectors in metric manifolds], Rendiconti del Circolo Matematico di Palermo (in Italian), 61 (2): 314–338, doi:10.1007/BF03014120, JFM 65.0796.06, S2CID 121908768, Zbl 0020.26002.
- Nalli, Pia (1976), Fichera, Gaetano; Guglielmino, Francesco (eds.), Opere scelte [Selected works], Opere dei Grandi Matematici Italiani (in Italian), Milano: Litografia D. Cislaghi per conto dell'Unione Matematica Italiana e dell'Università di Catania, p. 364, Zbl 1308.01004.
