= Stuart J. Edelstein =

Swiss-American biophysicist

Stuart Edelstein
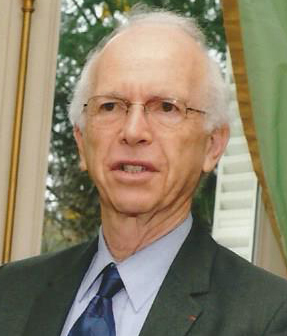
- Stuart Edelstein in Nov 2013
- Born: 1941 (age 84–85)
- Scientific career
- Fields: biophysics
- Workplaces: Babraham Institute

Stuart J. Edelstein (born 1941) is a biophysicist, emeritus professor from the University of Geneva, professor at the École Normale Supérieure and visiting scientist at the Babraham Institute.

His research focuses on the properties of allosteric proteins, which conformations and activities are affected by the binding of ligands. Using mathematical models and 3D structures, he studied the function of hemoglobin, solving the structure of mutant form leading to sickle-cell disease. He then turned his attention on the allosteric regulation of neurotransmitter receptors, in particular the nicotinic acetylcholine receptors in collaboration with Jean-Pierre Changeux.

== Life ==
Stuart Edelstein received a PhD (1967) in Biochemistry from the University of California, Berkeley. After a post-doctoral training at the Pasteur Institute in the laboratory of Jacques Monod, he joined the faculty of Cornell University, where he became professor in 1977. He served as chairman of the Section of Biochemistry, Molecular and Cell Biology from 1978 to 1980.

He was a visiting scientist at the Weizmann Institute of Science (1974) and spent two sabbatical years (1980–1981 and 1984–1985) in Paris as Professeur associé at the University of Paris XII (Créteil) in the laboratory of Jean Rosa and as visiting scientist at the Pasteur Institute

In 1986 Edelstein moved as professor in the department of Biochemistry of the University of Geneva. He was director of the department for the period 1987–1994. He served as president of the Swiss Biophysical Section (1994–1998) and president of the Swiss Committee of the International Union for Pure and Applied Biophysics. He returned to the Pasteur Institute in 1994 for a sabbatical leave in the laboratory of Jean-Pierre Changeux. He held the international chair at the Collège de France for the academic year 2002–2003.

In September 2006, Edelstein became professor emeritus at the University of Geneva. He continued research as a visiting scientist in several academic institutions, notably at the EMBL-European Bioinformatics Institute, the École Normale Supérieure and The Babraham Institute.

Edelstein was also active in the biotech sector as cofounder of Genomic Vision and Scipio bioscience. As President and Chief Scientific Officer at Scipio, he directed development of a kit-based approach to determine the gene expression profiles of thousands of individual cells by identifying their messenger RNA molecules in a reversible-hydrogel process known as RevGel-seq.

== Awards and recognition ==
- 2003, awarded the Legion of Honour, rank chevalier
- 1998, elected foreign member of the French Academy of Sciences

== Books ==
- Jean-Pierre Changeux, Stuart J Edelstein. Nicotinic acetylcholine receptors: From Molecular Biology to Cognition. (2005) Odile Jacob ed. ISBN 978-0976890805
- Stuart J Edelstein. Des gènes et génomes. (2002) Odile Jacob ed. ISBN 978-2738111500
- Daniel M Bollag, Michael D Rozycki, Stuart J Edelestein. Protein Methods (1996) ISBN 978-0471118374
- Stuart J Edelstein. The Sickled Cell: From Myths to Molecules. (1986) Harvard University Press. ISBN 978-0674807372
- J M Widom, Stuart J Edelstein. Chemistry: An Introduction to General, Organic and Biological Chemistry. (1981) W.H.Freeman. ISBN 978-0716712244
- Stuart J Edelstein. Introductory biochemistry; fundamentals of cellular metabolism and molecular biology. (1973) Holden-Day.ISBN 978-0816225309
