= Herman Valentiner =

Danish mathematician (1850–1913)

- Born: 8 May 1850; Gjorslev
- Died: 17 September 1913 (aged 63); Copenhagen
- Education: University of Copenhagen
- Known for: Valentiner group
- Scientific career
- Fields: Mathematics

Herman Valentiner (8 May 1850 – 17 September 1913) was a Danish mathematician who introduced the Valentiner group in 1889.

Valentiner earned his Ph.D. in 1881 from the University of Copenhagen with a thesis on space curves, and took a teaching position. However, soon afterwards he moved to a Danish life insurance company.
