= Maria Adelaide Sneider =

Italian mathematician

- Born: 6 December 1937; Asmara, Italian Empire
- Died: 1 May 1989 (aged 51); Rome
- Education: Università degli Studi di Trieste
- Known for: Capacity theory of non-smooth hypersurfaces; Eigenvalue theory; Mathematical analysis; Numerical analysis; Theory of pluriharmonic functions
- Scientific career
- Fields: Mathematics
- Workplaces: Sapienza University of Rome
- Doctoral advisor: Gaetano Fichera

Maria Adelaide Sneider (6 December 1937 – 1 May 1989) (also known as Maria Adelaide Sneider Ludovici, her second surname being "Ludovici") was an Italian mathematician working on numerical and mathematical analysis. She is known for her work on the theory of electrostatic capacities of non-smooth closed hypersurfaces: Apart from the development of precise estimates for the numerical approximation of the electrostatic capacity of the unit cube, this work also led her to give a rigorous proof of Green's identities for large classes of hypersurfaces with singularities, and later to develop an accurate mathematical analysis of the points effect. She is also known for her contributions to the Dirichlet problem for pluriharmonic functions on the unit sphere of $\mathbb{C}^n.$

== Work ==
Gaetano and his former student Adelaide Sneider have done important work on capacity and in particular on the capacity of a cube and the corresponding potential fields.

— Walter K. Hayman, (Hayman 1993, p. 119).

== Selected works ==
- Sneider, Maria Adelaide (1969), "Sul cerchio minimo contenente tutti gli autovalori di un operatore integrale di Fredholm con nucleo in L^{2}" [On the minimal disk containing all the eigenvalues of a Fredholm integral operator with L^{2} kernel], Atti della Accademia Nazionale dei Lincei. Rendiconti. Classe di Scienze Fisiche, Matematiche e Naturali, Serie VIII (in Italian), LXXXII (3–4): 145–150, MR 0264472, Zbl 0189.42101.
- Sneider Ludovici, Maria Adelaide (1970), "Sulla capacità elettrostatica di una superficie chiusa" [On the electrostatic capacity of a closed surface], Atti della Accademia Nazionale dei Lincei. Memorie. Classe di Scienze Fisiche, Matematiche e Naturali, Serie VII, Sezione I (in Italian), X (2): 97–215, Zbl 0232.31010. An accurate analysis of the problem of calculation of capacitances of surfaces with singularities.
- Sneider Ludovici, M. A. (14 April 1972), "Alcune osservazioni sulle formule di quadratura approssimata" [Some observations on approximate quadrature formulas] (PDF), Pontificia Academia Scientiarum Commentarii (in Italian), 2 (52): 1–16, is an analysis of the numerical performance of several one–dimensional quadrature formulas.
- Fichera, Gaetano; Sneider Ludovici, Maria Adelaide (13 May 1974), "Distribution de la charge electrique dans le voisinage des sommets et des aretes d'un cube" [Distribution of the electrical charge in the vicinity of the vertices and edges of a cube], Comptes rendus hebdomadaires des séances de l'Académie des Sciences, Série A : Sciences mathématiques (in French), 278: 1303–1306, MR 0351281, Zbl 0282.35038.
- Fichera, Gaetano; Sneider Ludovici, Maria Adelaide (1976), "Abstracts and Numerical Aspects of the Problem Concerning the Computation of Eigenfrequencies of Continuous Systems", in Fichera, Gaetano (ed.), Trends in Applications of Pure Mathematics to Mechanics. A collection of papers presented at a conference at the University of Lecce, Italy, in May 1975, Monograph and Studies in Mathematics, vol. 2, London–San Francisco–Melbourne: Pitman Publishing, pp. 63–90, ISBN 0-273-00129-9, MR 0483901, Zbl 0355.65049.
- Fichera, Gaetano; Sneider, Maria A.; Wyman, Jeffreys (1977), "On the existence of a steady state in a biological system", Atti della Accademia Nazionale dei Lincei. Memorie. Classe di Scienze Fisiche, Matematiche e Naturali, Serie VII, Sezione III, XIV (1): 1–26, Bibcode:1977PNAS...74.4182F, Zbl 0414.92004. A work presenting a complete interdisciplinary analysis of the stability of a system of ordinary differential equations containing a large number of parameters, modeling a biological system.
- Fichera, Gaetano; Sneider, Maria Adelaide; Wyman, Jeffreys (1977a), "On the existence of a steady state in a biological system", PNAS, 74 (10): 4182–4184, Bibcode:1977PNAS...74.4182F, doi:10.1073/pnas.74.10.4182, PMC 431902, PMID 270662. A short research announcement reporting the results detailed in (Fichera, Sneider & Wyman 1977).
- Sneider, Maria Adelaide (1983), "Sul problema pluriarmonico in un campo sferico di C^{n} per n≥ 3" [On the pluriharmonic problem on a ball in C^{n} for n≥ 3], Atti della Accademia Nazionale dei Lincei. Rendiconti. Classe di Scienze Fisiche, Matematiche e Naturali, Serie VIII (in Italian), LXXIV (6): 351–356, MR 0756715, Zbl 0577.32017. is Maria Adelaide Sneider's conclusive work on the Dirichlet problem for pluriharmonic functions on a ball in the complex euclidean space.
- Sneider, Maria Adelaide (1988), "Steady state in a biological system: global asymptotic stability", Atti della Accademia Nazionale dei Lincei. Rendiconti. Classe di Scienze Fisiche, Matematiche e Naturali, Serie VIII (in Italian), LXXXII (2): 345–352, MR 1152650, Zbl 0964.92502. Maria Adelaide Sneider's last paper, completing the results first presented in (Fichera, Sneider & Wyman 1977).

== See also ==
- Harmonic polynomial
- Potential theory
