= Ruggero Orlando =

Italian journalist and politician

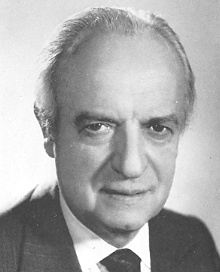
- Born: 5 July 1907; Verona, Italy
- Died: 18 April 1994 (aged 86); Rome, Italy
- Occupation: Journalist

Ruggero Orlando (5 July 1907 – 18 April 1994) was an Italian journalist, writer and politician.

== Life and career ==
Born in Verona, the son of the mathematician and Sapienza University professor Luciano, Orlando started his journalistic career in the 1920s, collaborating with various publications including La Stampa and Il Mattino. In 1936 he entered the national radio broadcaster EIAR and in 1938 he was promoted correspondent from London, where he matured a disaffection and detachment from Fascism which led him to join the London branch of the Italian Socialist Party.

In 1940 Orlando married a German Jewish woman, and was enrolled by the Political Intelligence Department as to collaborate under the name Gino Calzolari with Radio Londra and with several publications, and later as to act as a liaison officer between groups of the Italian resistance movement and Anglo-American troops. After the war he collaborated with important Italian and international media, including BBC, RAI, France Télévisions, The Observer, Il Messaggero and Epoca.

In 1954 Orlando moved to New York, becoming the official RAI United States correspondent and achieving a large popularity for his reports. In 1972 he was elected as a member of the Chamber of Deputies with the Italian Socialist Party and temporarily left journalism; in 1976 he reprised his journalistic career, collaborating with Rai 2 and Rai 3 as well as with several private networks and with several publications, notably being for some time the editor-in-chief of ABC magazine. He was the author of several books, spanning different genres.
