= Anne Cabot Wyman =

American travel writer (1929–2014)

- Born: Brookline, Massachusetts, U.S.
- Died: July 26, 2014
- Occupation: Journalist
- Notable work: Kipling's Cat: A Memoir of My Father; Boston Globe Travel Section
- Parents: Jeffries Wyman (biologist) (father); Anne McMaster Cabot (mother)

Anne Cabot Wyman (1929 – July 26, 2014) was an American journalist who was the first full-time travel writer of The Boston Globe and was the first woman appointed editor of the newspaper's editorial section.

She received an AB from Radcliffe College in 1953. She worked at Houghton Mifflin. In 1959, she joined The Boston Globe, where she worked for 31 years. In 1975, she became the first woman appointed chief editor of the newspaper's editorial pages.
