= Luciano Orlando =

Italian mathematician and engineer

Luciano Orlando (13 May 1887 – 21 August 1915) was an Italian mathematician and military engineer.

== Biography ==
Orlando was born in Caronia, Messina. In 1903 he received his laurea from the University of Messina, where he was a student of Bagnera and Marcolongo. After a year of graduate study at the University of Pisa, he became an assistant and libero docente at the University of Messina. After the 1908 Messina earthquake, he moved to Rome, where he taught at the Istituto superiore di Magistero and at the Aeronautical School of Engineering of the Sapienza University of Rome. He took part in some university competitions, but was unsuccessful.

In 1915, when he went into military action, some of his friends warned him that they thought his courage might quickly lead to his death. He died that year in Isonzo as Captain of Military Engineers, leading an action of his company of demolition specialists against the bridge of St. Daniel near Tolmin. (Half of the entire Italian WWI casualties occurred in the Battles of the Isonzo.)

He was an invited speaker of the International Congress of Mathematicians in 1908 in Rome.

Orlando's most important publications deal with mathematical physics, especially the theory of elasticity and the theory of integral equations. He was one of the first to recognize the importance of Pincherle-Goursat kernels, which are an important special case of Fredholm kernels. Also noteworthy is some of Orlando's algebraic research, inspired by his teacher Bagnera.

He was the father of the journalist, writer and politician Ruggero Orlando.

== Selected publications ==
- "Sulla deformazione di un triedro trirettangolo e di una lastra indefinita, elastici, isotropi." Rendiconti del Circolo Matematico di Palermo (1884–1940) 17, no. 2 (1903): 335–352.
- Relazione fra i minori d'ordine p d'una matrice quadrata di caratteristica p. Giornale di matematiche di Battaglini 40 (1902): 233–245.
- "Sulla riduzione delle quadriche a forma canonica Giornale di matematiche di Battaglini 41 (1903): 222–224.
- "Sulla sviluppo della funzione (1–z) exp(z + (z^{2})/2 + ... + (z^{p–1})/(p–1)) Giornale di matematiche di Battaglini 41 (1903): 377–378.
- "Sulla funzione n^{ma} di Green per la sfera". Giornale di matematiche di Battaglini 42 (1904): 292–296.
- "Sulla deformazione del suolo elastico isotropo." Rendiconti del Circolo Matematico di Palermo (1884–1940) 18, no. 1 (1904): 311–317.
- "Sopra alcune funzioni analoghe alla funzione di green per un parallelepipedo rettangolo." Rendiconti del Circolo Matematico di Palermo (1884–1940) 19, no. 1 (1905): 62–65.
- "Sulla deformazione di un solido isotropo limitato da due piani paralleli, per tensioni superficiali date." Rendiconti del Circolo Matematico di Palermo (1884–1940) 19, no. 1 (1905): 66–77.
- "Sull’integrazione della Δ^{4} in un parallelepipedo rettangolo." Rendiconti del Circolo Matematico di Palermo (1884–1940) 21, no. 1 (1906): 316–318.
- "Nuove osservazioni sulla formula integrale di Fourier." Rendiconti Accademia Lincei (5) vol. 18 (1909): 343–348.
- "Sulla risoluzione delle equazioni integrali." Tip. della R. Accad. dei Lincei, 1909.
- "Sopra alcuni problemi di aerodinamica." Il Nuovo Cimento (1901–1910) 20, no. 1 (1910): 46–51.
- "Sopra un brevetto crocco relativo all’attacco delle ali di un aeroplano." Il Nuovo Cimento (1901–1910) 20, no. 1 (1910): 52–57.
- "Effetto dell’attacco elastico sul rollio d’un aeroplano." Il Nuovo Cimento (1901-1910) 20, no. 1 (1910): 58–63.
- "Modo d’intensifigare gli effetti dell’attacco elastico in un aeroplano." Il Nuovo Cimento (1901–1910) 20, no. 1 (1910): 69–73.
- "Sulla caratteristica del risultante di Sylvester." Rendiconti Accademia Lincei (5) vol. 19 (1910): 257–269.
- "Nuove osservazioni sul problema di Hurwitz." Rendiconti Accademia Lincei (5) vol. 19 (1910): 317–321.
- "Sull'equazione alle semisomme e sul teorema di Hurwitz." Rendiconti Accademia Lincei (5) vol. 19 (1910): 390–393.
- "Sopra alcune questioni relative al problema di Hurwitz." Rendiconti Accademia Lincei (5) vol. 19 (1910): 430–434.
- "Sulla dimonstrazione elementare del teorema di Hurwitz." Rendiconti Accademia Lincei (5) vol. 20 (1911): 742–745.
- "Sul problema di Hurwitz relativo alle parti reali delle radici di un'equazione algebrica." Mathematische Annalen 71, no. 2 (1911): 233–245.
