= Gerbaldi's theorem =

Result in linear algebra and projective geometry

In linear algebra and projective geometry, Gerbaldi's theorem, proved by Gerbaldi (1882), states that one can find six pairwise apolar linearly independent nondegenerate ternary quadratic forms. These are permuted by the Valentiner group.
