= De Franchis theorem =

Finiteness statements applying to compact Riemann surfaces

In mathematics, the de Franchis theorem is one of a number of closely related statements applying to compact Riemann surfaces, or, more generally, algebraic curves, X and Y, in the case of genus g > 1. The simplest is that the automorphism group of X is finite (see though Hurwitz's automorphisms theorem). More generally,

- the set of non-constant morphisms from X to Y is finite;
- fixing X, for all but a finite number of such Y, there is no non-constant morphism from X to Y.

These results are named for Michele De Franchis (1875–1946). It is sometimes referenced as the De Franchis-Severi theorem. It was used in an important way by Gerd Faltings to prove the Mordell conjecture.

== See also ==
- Castelnuovo–de Franchis theorem
