= Allosteric regulation =

Regulation of enzyme activity

Allosteric regulation of an enzyme

In the fields of biochemistry and pharmacology an allosteric regulator (or allosteric modulator) is a substance that binds to a site on an enzyme or receptor distinct from the active site, resulting in a conformational change that alters the protein's activity, either enhancing or inhibiting its function. In contrast, substances that bind directly to an enzyme's active site or the binding site of the endogenous ligand of a receptor are called orthosteric regulators or modulators.

The site to which the effector binds is termed the allosteric site or regulatory site. Allosteric sites allow effectors to bind to the protein, often resulting in a conformational change and/or a change in protein dynamics. Effectors that enhance the protein's activity are referred to as allosteric activators, whereas those that decrease the protein's activity are called allosteric inhibitors.

Allosteric regulations are a natural example of control loops, such as feedback from downstream products or feedforward from upstream substrates. Long-range allostery is especially important in cell signaling. Allosteric regulation is also particularly important in the cell's ability to adjust enzyme activity.

The term allostery comes from the Ancient Greek allos (ἄλλος), "other", and stereos (στερεός), "solid (object)". This is in reference to the fact that the regulatory site of an allosteric protein is physically distinct from its active site. Allostery contrasts with substrate presentation which requires no conformational change for an enzyme's activation. The term orthostery comes from the Ancient Greek orthós (ὀρθός) meaning "straight", "upright", "right" or "correct".

== Ortho vs. allosteric inhibitors ==
=== Orthosteric ===
1. Binding Site: Orthosteric inhibitors bind directly to the enzyme's active site, where the substrate normally binds.
2. Mechanism of Action: By occupying the active site, these inhibitors prevent the substrate from binding, thereby directly blocking the enzyme's catalytic activity.
3. Competitive Inhibition: Most orthosteric inhibitors compete with the substrate for the active site, which means their effectiveness can be reduced if substrate concentration increases.

=== Allosteric ===
1. Binding Site: Allosteric inhibitors bind to a site on the enzyme that is distinct and separate from the active site, known as the allosteric site.
2. Mechanism of Action: Binding to the allosteric site induces a conformational change in the enzyme that can either reduce the affinity of the active site for the substrate or alter the enzyme's catalytic activity. This indirect interference can inhibit the enzyme's function even if the substrate is present.
3. Non-Competitive Inhibition: Allosteric inhibitors often exhibit non-competitive inhibition, meaning their inhibitory effect is not dependent on the substrate concentration.

== Models ==
A – Active site B – Allosteric site C – Substrate D – Inhibitor E – Enzyme This is a diagram of allosteric regulation of an enzyme.

Many allosteric effects can be explained by the concerted MWC model put forth by Monod, Wyman, and Changeux, or by the sequential model (also known as the KNF model) described by Koshland, Nemethy, and Filmer. Both postulate that protein subunits exist in one of two conformations, tensed (T) or relaxed (R), and that relaxed subunits bind substrate more readily than those in the tense state. The two models differ most in their assumptions about subunit interaction and the preexistence of both states. For proteins in which subunits exist in more than two conformations, the allostery landscape model described by Cuendet, Weinstein, and LeVine, can be used. Allosteric regulation may be facilitated by the evolution of large-scale, low-energy conformational changes, which enables long-range allosteric interaction between distant binding sites.

=== Concerted model ===
The concerted model of allostery, also referred to as the symmetry model or MWC model, postulates that enzyme subunits are connected in such a way that a conformational change in one subunit is necessarily conferred to all other subunits. Thus, all subunits must exist in the same conformation. The model further holds that, in the absence of any ligand (substrate or otherwise), the equilibrium favors one of the conformational states, T or R. The equilibrium can be shifted to the R or T state through the binding of one ligand (the allosteric effector or ligand) to a site that is different from the active site

=== Sequential model ===
The sequential model of allosteric regulation holds that subunits are not connected in such a way that a conformational change in one induces a similar change in the others. Thus, all enzyme subunits do not necessitate the same conformation. Moreover, the sequential model dictates that molecules of a substrate bind via an induced fit protocol. While such an induced fit converts a subunit from the tensed state to relaxed state, it does not propagate the conformational change to adjacent subunits. Instead, substrate-binding at one subunit only slightly alters the structure of other subunits so that their binding sites are more receptive to substrate. To summarize:

- subunits need not exist in the same conformation
- molecules of substrate bind via induced-fit protocol
- conformational changes are not propagated to all subunits

=== Morpheein model ===
The morpheein model of allosteric regulation is a dissociative concerted model.

A morpheein is a homo-oligomeric structure that can exist as an ensemble of physiologically significant and functionally different alternate quaternary assemblies. Transitions between alternate morpheein assemblies involve oligomer dissociation, conformational change in the dissociated state, and reassembly to a different oligomer. The required oligomer disassembly step differentiates the morpheein model for allosteric regulation from the classic MWC and KNF models.

Porphobilinogen synthase (PBGS) is the prototype morpheein.

=== Ensemble models ===
Ensemble models of allosteric regulation enumerate an allosteric system's statistical ensemble as a function of its potential energy function, and then relate specific statistical measurements of allostery to specific energy terms in the energy function (such as an intermolecular salt bridge between two domains). Ensemble models like the ensemble allosteric model and allosteric Ising model assume that each domain of the system can adopt two states similar to the MWC model. The allostery landscape model introduced by Cuendet, Weinstein, and LeVine allows for the domains to have any number of states and the contribution of a specific molecular interaction to a given allosteric coupling can be estimated using a rigorous set of rules. Molecular dynamics simulations can be used to estimate a system's statistical ensemble so that it can be analyzed with the allostery landscape model.

== Allosteric modulation ==
Allosteric modulation is used to alter the activity of molecules and enzymes in biochemistry and pharmacology. For comparison, a typical drug is made to bind to the active site of an enzyme which thus prohibits binding of a substrate to that enzyme causing a decrease in enzyme activity. Allosteric modulation occurs when an effector binds to an allosteric site (also known as a regulatory site) of an enzyme and alters the enzyme activity. Allosteric modulators are designed to fit the allosteric site to cause a conformational change of the enzyme, in particular a change in the shape of the active site, which then causes a change in its activity. In contrast to typical drugs, modulators are not competitive inhibitors. They can be positive (activating) causing an increase of the enzyme activity or negative (inhibiting) causing a decrease of the enzyme activity. The use of allosteric modulation allows the control of the effects of specific enzyme activities; as a result, allosteric modulators are very effective in pharmacology. In a biological system, allosteric modulation can be difficult to distinguish from modulation by substrate presentation.

== Energy sensing model ==
An example of this model is seen with the enzyme pyruvate kinase of Mycobacterium tuberculosis, a bacterium that is perfectly suited to adapt to living in the macrophages of humans. The enzyme's sites serve as a communication between different substrates. Specifically between AMP and G6P. Sites like these also serve as a sensing mechanism for the enzyme's performance.

=== Positive modulation ===
Positive allosteric modulation (also known as allosteric activation) occurs when the binding of one ligand enhances the affinity of other binding sites. An example is the binding of oxygen molecules to hemoglobin, where oxygen is both the physiological ligand and the modulator (or effector). Here, the allosteric, or "other", site is the equivalent binding site of another protein subunit. The binding of oxygen to one subunit induces a conformational change in that subunit that interacts with the remaining binding sites to enhance their oxygen affinity. This type of allosteric modulation is also known as homotropic allostery or cooperativity as it describes the allosteric interaction between equivalent sites in an oligomeric protein. Another example of allosteric activation is seen in cytosolic IMP-GMP specific 5'-nucleotidase II (cN-II), where the affinity for substrate GMP increases upon GTP binding at the dimer interface. As the two sites are not equivalent, this type of cooperativity is heterotropic.

=== Negative modulation ===
Negative allosteric modulation (also known as allosteric inhibition) occurs when the binding of one ligand decreases the affinity for a ligand at other binding sites. For example, when 2,3-BPG binds to an allosteric site on hemoglobin, the affinity for oxygen of all subunits decreases.

Direct thrombin inhibitors provides an excellent example of negative allosteric modulation. Allosteric inhibitors of thrombin have been discovered that could potentially be used as anticoagulants.

Another example is strychnine, a convulsant poison, which acts as an allosteric inhibitor of the glycine receptor. Glycine is a major post-synaptic inhibitory neurotransmitter in mammalian spinal cord and brain stem. Strychnine acts at a separate binding site on the glycine receptor in an allosteric manner; i.e., its binding lowers the affinity of the glycine receptor for glycine. Thus, strychnine inhibits the action of an inhibitory transmitter, leading to convulsions.

Another instance in which negative allosteric modulation can be seen is between ATP and the enzyme phosphofructokinase within the negative feedback loop that regulates glycolysis. Phosphofructokinase (generally referred to as PFK) is an enzyme that catalyses the third step of glycolysis: the phosphorylation of fructose-6-phosphate into fructose 1,6-bisphosphate. PFK can be allosterically inhibited by high levels of ATP within the cell. When ATP levels are high, ATP will bind to an allosteric site on phosphofructokinase, causing a change in the enzyme's three-dimensional shape. This change causes its affinity for substrate (fructose-6-phosphate and ATP) at the active site to decrease, and the enzyme is deemed inactive. This causes glycolysis to cease when ATP levels are high, thus conserving the body's glucose and maintaining balanced levels of cellular ATP. In this way, ATP serves as a negative allosteric modulator for PFK, despite the fact that it is also a substrate of the enzyme.

== Types ==
=== Homotropic ===
A homotropic allosteric modulator is a substrate for its target protein, as well as a regulatory molecule of the protein's activity. It is typically an activator of the protein. For example, O_{2} and CO are homotropic allosteric modulators of hemoglobin. Likewise, in IMP/GMP specific 5' nucleotidase, binding of one GMP molecule to a single subunit of the tetrameric enzyme leads to increased affinity for GMP by the subsequent subunits as revealed by sigmoidal substrate versus velocity plots.

=== Heterotropic ===
A heterotropic allosteric modulator is a regulatory molecule that is not the enzyme's substrate. It may be either an activator or an inhibitor of the enzyme. For example, H^{+}, CO_{2}, and 2,3-bisphosphoglycerate are heterotropic allosteric modulators of hemoglobin. Once again, in IMP/GMP specific 5' nucleotidase, binding of GTP molecule at the dimer interface in the tetrameric enzyme leads to increased affinity for substrate GMP at the active site indicating towards K-type heterotropic allosteric activation.

As has been amply highlighted above, some allosteric proteins can be regulated by both their substrates and other molecules. Such proteins are capable of both homotropic and heterotropic interactions.

=== Essential activators ===
Some allosteric activators are referred to as "essential", or "obligate" activators, in the sense that in their absence, the activity of their target enzyme activity is very low or negligible, as is the case with N-acetylglutamate's activity on carbamoyl phosphate synthetase I, for example.

== Non-regulatory allostery ==
A non-regulatory allosteric site is any non-regulatory component of an enzyme (or any protein), that is not itself an amino acid. For instance, many enzymes require sodium binding to ensure proper function. However, the sodium does not necessarily act as a regulatory subunit; the sodium is always present and there are no known biological processes to add/remove sodium to regulate enzyme activity. Non-regulatory allostery could comprise any other ions besides sodium (calcium, magnesium, zinc), as well as other chemicals and possibly vitamins.

== Pharmacology ==
Allosteric modulation of a receptor results from the binding of allosteric modulators at a different site (a "regulatory site") from that of the endogenous ligand (an "active site") and enhances or inhibits the effects of the endogenous ligand. Under normal circumstances, it acts by causing a conformational change in a receptor molecule, which results in a change in the binding affinity of the ligand. In this way, an allosteric ligand modulates the receptor's activation by its primary orthosteric ligand, and can be thought to act like a dimmer switch in an electrical circuit, adjusting the intensity of the response.

For example, the GABA_{A} receptor has two active sites that the neurotransmitter gamma-aminobutyric acid (GABA) binds, but also has benzodiazepine and general anaesthetic agent regulatory binding sites. These regulatory sites can each produce positive allosteric modulation, potentiating the activity of GABA. Diazepam is a positive allosteric modulator at the benzodiazepine regulatory site, and its antidote flumazenil is a receptor antagonist.

More recent examples of drugs that allosterically modulate their targets include the calcium-mimicking cinacalcet and the HIV treatment maraviroc.

=== Allosteric sites as drug targets ===
Allosteric proteins are involved in, and are central in many diseases, and allosteric sites may represent a novel drug target. There are a number of advantages in using allosteric modulators as preferred therapeutic agents over classic orthosteric ligands. For example, G protein-coupled receptor (GPCR) allosteric binding sites have not faced the same evolutionary pressure as orthosteric sites to accommodate an endogenous ligand, so are more diverse. Therefore, greater GPCR selectivity may be obtained by targeting allosteric sites. This is particularly useful for GPCRs where selective orthosteric therapy has been difficult because of sequence conservation of the orthosteric site across receptor subtypes. Also, these modulators have a decreased potential for toxic effects, since modulators with limited co-operativity will have a ceiling level to their effect, irrespective of the administered dose. Another type of pharmacological selectivity that is unique to allosteric modulators is based on co-operativity. An allosteric modulator may display neutral co-operativity with an orthosteric ligand at all subtypes of a given receptor except the subtype of interest, which is termed "absolute subtype selectivity". If an allosteric modulator does not possess appreciable efficacy, it can provide another powerful therapeutic advantage over orthosteric ligands, namely the ability to selectively tune up or down tissue responses only when the endogenous agonist is present. Oligomer-specific small molecule binding sites are drug targets for medically relevant morpheeins.

== Synthetic allosteric systems ==
There are many synthetic compounds containing several noncovalent binding sites, which exhibit conformational changes upon occupation of one site. Cooperativity between single binding contributions in such supramolecular systems is positive if occupation of one binding site enhances the affinity ΔG at a second site, and negative if the affinity isn't highered. Most synthetic allosteric complexes rely on conformational reorganization upon the binding of one effector ligand which then leads to either enhanced or weakened association of second ligand at another binding site. Conformational coupling between several binding sites is in artificial systems usually much larger than in proteins with their usually larger flexibility. The parameter which determines the efficiency (as measured by the ratio of equilibrium constants Krel = KA(E)/KA in presence and absence of an effector E ) is the conformational energy needed to adopt a closed or strained conformation for the binding of a ligand A.

In many multivalent supramolecular systems direct interaction between bound ligands can occur, which can lead to large cooperativities. Most common is such a direct interaction between ions in receptors for ion-pairs. This cooperativity is often also referred to as allostery, even though conformational changes here are not necessarily triggering binding events.

== Online resources ==
=== Allosteric Database ===
Allostery is a direct and efficient means for regulation of biological macromolecule function, produced by the binding of a ligand at an allosteric site topographically distinct from the orthosteric site. Due to the often high receptor selectivity and lower target-based toxicity, allosteric regulation is also expected to play an increasing role in drug discovery and bioengineering. The AlloSteric Database (ASD) provides a central resource for the display, search and analysis of the structure, function and related annotation for allosteric molecules. Currently, ASD contains allosteric proteins from more than 100 species and modulators in three categories (activators, inhibitors, and regulators). Each protein is annotated with detailed description of allostery, biological process and related diseases, and each modulator with binding affinity, physicochemical properties and therapeutic area. Integrating the information of allosteric proteins in ASD should allow the prediction of allostery for unknown proteins, to be followed with experimental validation. In addition, modulators curated in ASD can be used to investigate potential allosteric targets for a query compound, and can help chemists to implement structure modifications for novel allosteric drug design.

=== Allosteric residues and their prediction ===
Not all protein residues play equally important roles in allosteric regulation. The identification of residues that are essential to allostery (so-called "allosteric residues") has been the focus of many studies, especially within the last decade. In part, this growing interest is a result of their general importance in protein science, but also because allosteric residues may be exploited in biomedical contexts. Pharmacologically important proteins with difficult-to-target sites may yield to approaches in which one alternatively targets easier-to-reach residues that are capable of allosterically regulating the primary site of interest. These residues can broadly be classified as surface- and interior-allosteric amino acids. Allosteric sites at the surface generally play regulatory roles that are fundamentally distinct from those within the interior; surface residues may serve as receptors or effector sites in allosteric signal transmission, whereas those within the interior may act to transmit such signals.

== See also ==
- ASD database
- Anharmonicity
- Competitive inhibition
- Cooperative binding
- Enzyme kinetics
- Protein dynamics
- Receptor theory
