= Giuseppe Bagnera (mathematician) =

Italian mathematician (1865–1927)

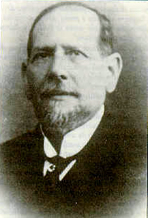
- Born: 14 November 1865; Bagheria, Province of Palermo
- Died: 12 May 1927 (aged 61); Rome
- Education: University of Palermo
- Scientific career
- Fields: Mathematics
- Workplaces: University of Messina; University of Palermo; Sapienza University of Rome

Giuseppe Bagnera (14 November 1865 – 12 May 1927) was an Italian mathematician.

== Biography ==
At the University of Palermo, Bagnera received his laurea in civil engineering in 1890 and then his laurea in mathematics in 1895. His teachers included Giovanni Battista Guccia, Francesco Gerbaldi ed Ernesto Cesàro. In 1899 he was appointed libero docente (lecturer) in algebraic analysis at the University of Palermo. He was appointed professor extraordinarius of infinitesimal calculus in 1901, then professor ordinarius in 1905, at the University of Messina, where he remained until the 1908 earthquake. He then taught at the University of Palermo until 1922 when he moved to the Sapienza University of Rome, where he taught until his death.

== Contributions ==
He was an Invited Speaker, along with Michele de Franchis, of the ICM in April 1908 in Rome.

After the 1908 earthquake, Bagnera's publications included little research but consisted mainly of his lecture notes, which were of superb quality and polished to a high standard of clarity and accuracy.

== Recognition ==
In 1909, along with Michele de Franchis, Bagnera received the prix Bordin from the French Academy of Sciences for a work on hyperelliptic surfaces. Bagnera was elected a member of the Accademia Nazionale dei Lincei and was made an honorary professor of the Washington University in St. Louis. His research dealt with finite groups, algebraic varieties, and abelian functions. His students include Michele Cipolla, Pia Nalli, and Luciano Orlando.

== See also ==
- Descendant tree (group theory)
