= Castelnuovo–de Franchis theorem =

When differentials on an algebraic surface represent as a pullback of an algebraic curve

In mathematics, the Castelnuovo–de Franchis theorem is a classical result on complex algebraic surfaces. Let X be such a surface, projective and non-singular, and let

ω_{1} and ω_{2}

be two differentials of the first kind on X which are linearly independent but with wedge product 0. Then this data can be represented as a pullback of an algebraic curve: there is a non-singular algebraic curve C, a morphism

φ: X → C,

and differentials of the first kind ω′_{1} and ω′_{2} on C such that

φ*(ω′_{1}) = ω_{1} and φ*(ω′_{2}) = ω_{2}.

This result is due to Guido Castelnuovo and Michele de Franchis (1875–1946).

The converse, that two such pullbacks would have wedge 0, is immediate.

== See also ==
- de Franchis theorem
