= Patrick Charnay =

French biologist, researcher

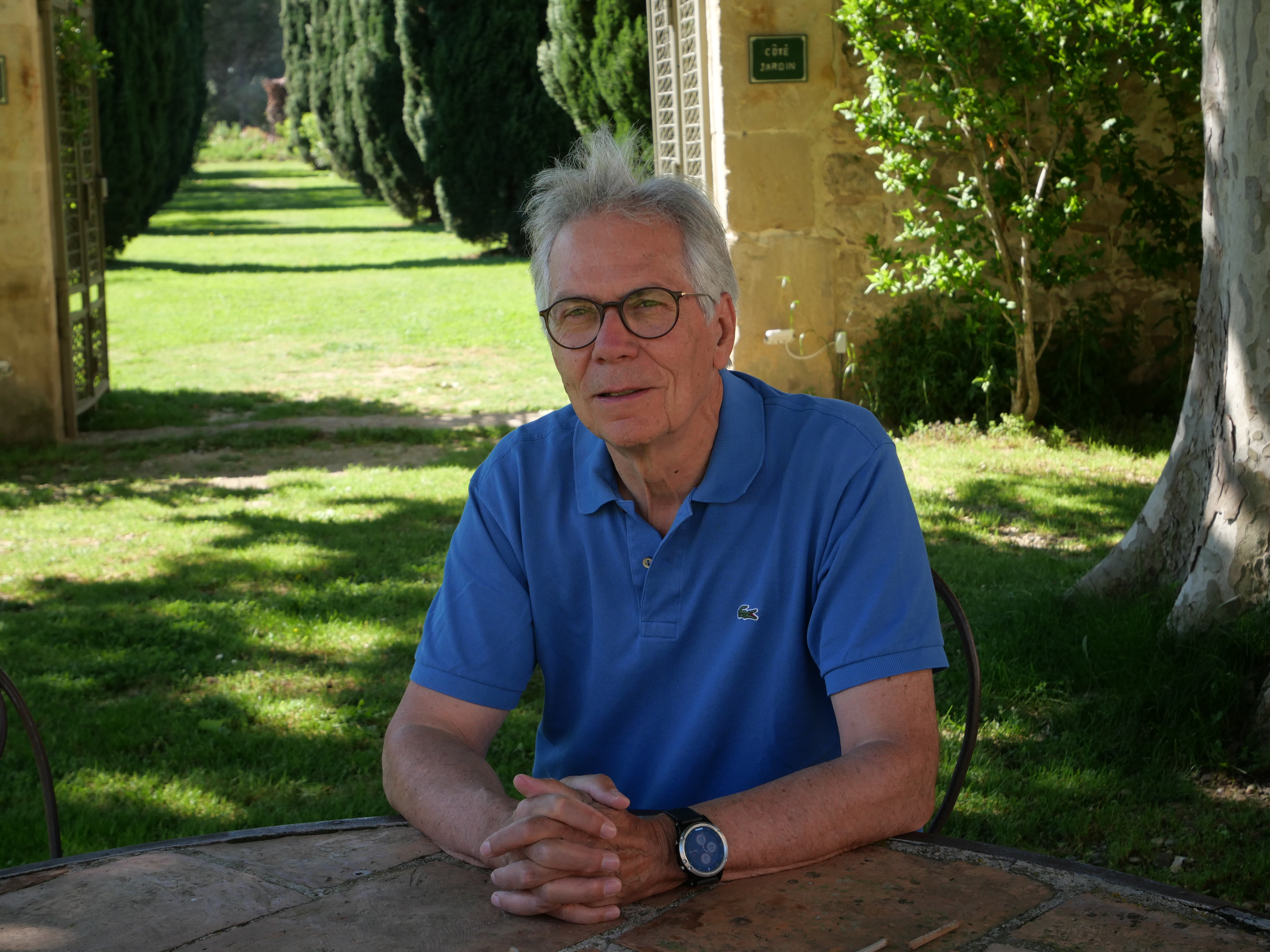
- Born: 3 February 1954 (age 72)
- Education: Ecole Polytechnique
- Scientific career
- Fields: Biology

Patrick Charnay (born 3 February 1954) is a French biologist and researcher. Serving as an emeritus research director for Inserm, he works and teaches in molecular genetics and development biology at the École normale supérieure (ENS) in Paris.

== Biography ==
Charnay is a former student of the École Polytechnique (1973 school year). Upon graduation, he turned towards fundamental biology and embarked on a science thesis in Pierre Tiollais' laboratory at the Institut Pasteur. He devoted himself particularly to the research of the cloning and sequencing of the hepatitis B virus genome, as well as to the synthesis of the surface antigen in the bacterium. His research findings paved the way for the development of a safe and effective vaccine against the disease. Charnay was recruited by Inserm in 1980. After obtaining his PhD in 1981, he did a postdoctoral fellowship in Tom Maniatis' laboratory at Harvard University (Cambridge, USA), where he studied the molecular basis for the regulation of globin gene expression. In 1984, he joined the European Molecular Biology Laboratory (EMBL) in Heidelberg (Germany) as a group leader and focused on the study of transcription factors that played a decisive role in establishing the nervous system during development. Since 1989, he has been working in the Biology Department of the ENS, where he continues to study genes that play an important role in the development of the nervous system or its function and regulation. At ENS, Patrick Charnay was Director of an Inserm Unit (1993–2005), Director of the Biology Department (2000–2001 and 2016–2017) and Professor of Biology (2013–2018). He also taught at the École Polytechnique (1997–2010).

Charnay has been a member of EMBO since 1995, of the Academia Europaea since 1998 and of the French Academy of Sciences since 2004. During his career, he has participated in (or chaired) numerous scientific committees.

== Scientific contributions ==
Charnay has spent most of his career focusing on the genetic regulatory mechanisms that control the development and function of the central and peripheral nervous system of vertebrates. Main scientific contributions:

- Cloning and sequencing of the hepatitis B virus genome and production of surface antigen (HBs) in the bacterium.
- Basis for regulating the expression of human alpha- and beta-globin genes.
- Discovery of a family of vertebrate genes encoding zinc finger transcription factors, one of which, Krox20, is expressed in two alternate territories of a segmented embryonic structure, the hindbrain or rhombencephalon, which forms medulla oblongata, pons, and cerebellum.
- Deciphering the structural bases for discrimination between nucleotides of DNA by zinc fingers.
- Discovery of members of the Eph family of tyrosine kinase receptors involved in the segmentation of the rhombencephalon.
- Essential role of Krox20 in the rhombencephalon segmentation process and in particular in specifying segment identity, through the control of the expression of different Hox genes.
- Decisive involvement of Krox20 in controlling the formation and maintenance of peripheral myelin.
- Role of Krox20 in the rhythmogenic neural networks of the pons
- Role of the Krox24/Egr-1 gene in pituitary and ovarian functions.
- Involvement of the Krox24 gene in the development of late LTP and long-term memory consolidation.
- Role of boundary capsule cells as a barrier between the central and peripheral nervous system and as a progenitor of neural and glial cells of the peripheral nervous system.
- Deciphering the genetic network governing the expression of Krox20 and its involvement in the segmentation of the rhombencephalon.
- Development of a mouse model reproducing all aspects of Neurofibromatosis type I.

== Awards and honours ==
- 1988: Paris Prize of the French National League against Cancer.
- 1995: Member of the European Molecular Biology Organisation (EMBO)
- 1998: Member of Academia Europaea
- 2004: Member of the French Academy of Sciences
- 2005: Knight in the Order of Academic Palms
