= Giuseppe Bagnera (politician) =

Italian politician

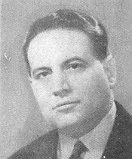
Giuseppe Bagnera

Giuseppe Bagnera (10 July 1878, Palermo - 12 September 1953) was an Italian politician belonging to the Christian Democracy. He was elected member of the Chamber of Deputies in 1948.
