= Valentiner group =

In mathematics, the Valentiner group is the perfect triple cover of the alternating group on 6 points, and is a group of order 1080. It was found by Herman Valentiner (1889) in the form of an action of A_{6} on the complex projective plane, and was studied further by Wiman (1896).

All perfect alternating groups have perfect double covers. In most cases this is the universal central extension. The two exceptions are A_{6} (whose perfect triple cover is the Valentiner group) and A_{7}, whose universal central extensions have centers of order 6.

== Representations ==
- The alternating group A_{6} acts on the complex projective plane, and Gerbaldi (1898) showed that the group acts on the 6 conics of Gerbaldi's theorem. This gives a homomorphism to PGL_{3}(C), and the lift of this to the triple cover SL_{3}(C) is the Valentiner group. This embedding can be defined over the field generated by the 15th roots of unity.
- The product of the Valentiner group with a group of order 2 is a 3-dimensional complex reflection group of order 2160 generated by 45 complex reflections of order 2. The invariants form a polynomial algebra with generators of degrees 6, 12, and 30.
- The Valentiner group has complex irreducible faithful group representations of dimension 3, 3, 3, 3, 6, 6, 9, 9, 15, 15.
- The Valentiner group can be represented as the monomial symmetries of the hexacode, the 3-dimensional subspace of F^{6}_{4} spanned by (001111), (111100), and (0101ωω̅), where the elements of the finite field F_{4} are 0, 1, ω, ω̅.
- The group PGL_{3}(F_{4}) acts on the 2-dimensional projective plane over F_{4} and acts transitively on its hyperovals (sets of 6 points such that no three are on a line). The subgroup fixing a hyperoval is a copy of the alternating group A_{6}. The lift of this to the triple cover GL_{3}(F_{4}) of PGL_{3}(F_{4}) is the Valentiner group.
- Crespo & Hajto (2005) described the representations of the Valentiner group as a Galois group, and gave an order 3 differential equation with the Valentiner group as its differential Galois group.
