= Jean-Pierre Changeux =

French neuroscientist (born 1936)

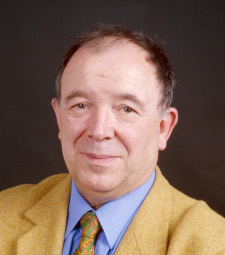
- Born: 6 April 1936 (age 90); Domont, France
- Education: École Normale Supérieure; Pasteur Institute
- Known for: MWC model, isolation of nAChR
- Spouse: Annie Dupont (m. 1962)
- Children: 1 son
- Awards: Wolf Prize in Medicine (1982); Louis-Jeantet Prize for Medicine (1993); Sir Hans Krebs Medal (1994); Balzan Prize (2001); Albert Einstein World Award of Science (2018)
- Scientific career
- Fields: Neuroscience
- Workplaces: Collège de France; Institut Pasteur
- Doctoral advisors: Jacques Monod, François Jacob

Jean-Pierre Changeux (French: [ʃɑ̃ʒø]; born 6 April 1936) is a French neuroscientist known for his research in several fields of biology, from the structure and function of proteins (with a focus on the allosteric proteins), to the early development of the nervous system up to cognitive functions. Although being famous in biological sciences for the MWC model, the identification and purification of the nicotinic acetylcholine receptor, the theory of epigenesis by synapse selection and the global neuronal workspace theory for conscious processing are also notable scientific achievements. Changeux is known by the non-scientific public for his ideas regarding the connection between mind and physical brain. As put forth in his book, Conversations on Mind, Matter and Mathematics, Changeux strongly supports the view that the nervous system functions in a projective rather than reactive style and that interaction with the environment, rather than being instructive, results in the selection amongst a diversity of preexisting internal representations.

== Biography ==
Changeux was born in Domont, France to Marcel Changeux and Jeanne Benoît. He entered the École Normale Supérieure in 1955, where he obtained a bachelor's degree (Licence) in 1957 and a master's degree (Diplome d'Études Supérieure) in 1958. He also received his agrégation in natural science the same year. He began his scientific career during his ENS years during summer internships in Banyuls-sur-Mer where he identified a new genus of parasitic Copepod. He pursued PhD studies at the Pasteur Institute under the direction of Jacques Monod and François Jacob, and gained his doctorate in 1964. Changeux then left France for postdoctoral studies first at the University of California Berkeley (1965–1966) then at Columbia University College of Physicians and Surgeons, New York (1967). He returned to France as attaché to the chair of Molecular Biology held by Jacques Monod. In 1972, he became director of the Unit of Molecular Neurobiology at the Pasteur Institute, where he received a professorship in 1975. In 1975, Changeux was elected professor at the Collège de France, chair of Cell Communications, position that he held until 2006. Changeux is author of more than 600 scientific articles and several books, technical or for general audience.

== Scientific achievements ==
All his scientific career, Changeux has been focused on a handful of scientific questions, at molecular, cellular and brain levels. A unifying theme to all of them is the conviction that selection is the basis of life processes, rather than instruction. While started as separate lines of investigations, all the research threads were tied in the recent decades within the study of allosteric mechanisms as a basis of for the involvement of nicotinic receptors in cognitive functions.

=== Allostery ===
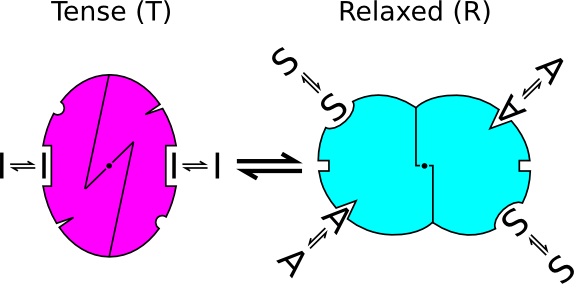
Diagram representing an allosteric transition of a protein between R and T states, stabilised by an Agonist, and Inhibitor and a Substrate. Adapted from Changeux and Edelstein (2004) Nicotinic Acetylcholine Receptors: From Molecular Biology to Cognition.

During his PhD studies in the laboratory of Jacques Monod and François Jacob, Changeux studied the allosteric regulations of enzymes, that is the modulation of their activity by compounds different from their substrates. This work led to the development of the model of concerted transitions for allosteric proteins. The main ideas behind this theory are: 1) proteins can exist under various conformations in thermal equilibrium in the absence of regulators. The allosteric regulators merely shift the equilibrium between the conformations, stabilizing the ones for which they display the highest affinity, and 2) all the subunits of a symmetrical multimeric protein exist in the same conformation, the transition taking place in a concerted fashion. The resulting model explains the observed cooperativity without a progressive change of biophysical parameters. This conceptual framework is still the principal model used to explain the function of cooperative proteins such as hemoglobin.

In his PhD thesis, Changeux suggested that the recognition and transmission of signals by membrane, and in particular by synapses, could use the same mechanisms as the allosteric regulation of enzymes. More than forty years of research would follow, mainly focussed on nicotinic acetylcholine receptors (see below). In 1967, Changeux extended the MWC model to bi-dimensional lattice of receptors (an idea that would also be developed three decades afterward by Dennis Bray). He then applied this idea to the post-synaptic membrane of electric organs (analog to striated muscle). His team demonstrated the existence of several interconvertible states for the nicotinic receptor, resting, open and desensitized, displaying different affinities for the ligands, such as the endogenous agonist acetylcholine. The transitions between the states followed different kinetics, and those kinetics plus the differential affinities sufficed to explain the shape of the post-synaptic potential. A full mechanistic model of the nicotinic receptor from striated muscle (or electric organ) was to be provided much later, when Changeux collaborated with Stuart Edelstein, another specialist of allostery, who worked decades on hemoglobin. In addition to the allosteric modulation of the channel gating by the agonists, many other regulations of the ligand-gated ion channels activity have since been discovered. The modulators bind to a variety of allosteric sites, whether on the agonist binding sites, other binding sites at the subunit interfaces, on the cytoplasmic part of the protein or in the transmembrane domain.

The concept of an allosteric pharmacology for ion channels was developed over the years. In addition to the well known GABAA receptor positive allosteric modulators (such as benzodiazepines and barbiturate drugs), one can find antiparasitic drug such as ivermectin and glutamate receptor modulators used against Alzheimer's disease such as aniracetam.

=== Nicotinic receptor structure ===
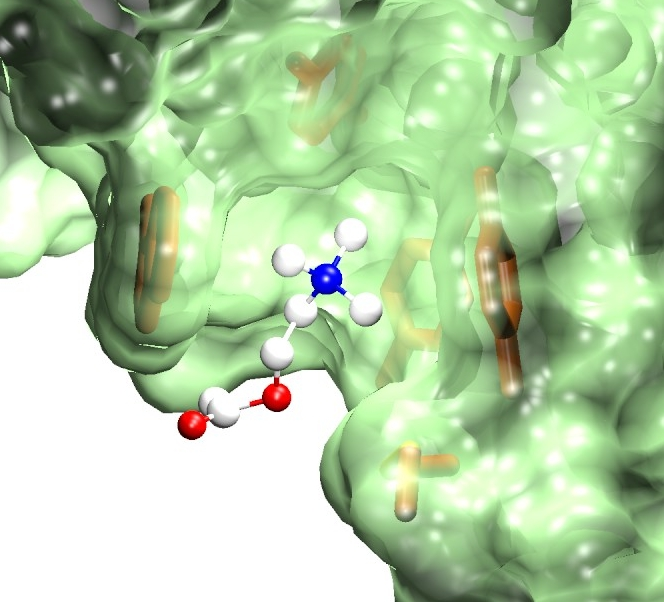
Neurotransmitter acetylcholine bound to the nicotinic acetylcholine receptor. Adapted from

In 1970, Changeux isolated the nicotinic acetylcholine receptor of the eel electric organ, the first ever isolated membrane pharmacological receptor, that he was able to identify thanks to the properties of a snake toxin, which was purified by Taiwanese researchers CY Lee and CC Chang. The isolation of the receptor was also later reported by Ricardo Miledi. The improvements of purification methods developed in the group allowed the proposition that the receptor was a pentameric protein, a finding quickly confirmed by the team of Arthur Karlin. The group of Changeux was among the firsts to elucidate the primary structure of the subunits of the receptor, in parallel with the group of Shosaku Numa and Stephen Heinemann.

Throughout the 1980s and 1990s, molecular biology technics were used to decipher the tertiary and quaternary structures of the receptor. The location of the ionic pore was identified, made up of the second transmembrane segment, as shown also later by the groups of Shosaku Numa and Ferdinand Hucho. The molecular basis of ionic selectivity were also identified in the transmembrane domain. The structure of the binding site for the acetylcholine and nicotine was located at the interface between adjacent subunits.

The quest of Changeux for the structure of the nicotinic receptor culminated with the publication of the structure, at atomic resolution, of a bacterial homolog in the open and resting conformations supporting the concept of a symmetrical concerted opening for channel gating, in agreement with molecular dynamics simulations.

=== Stabilization of synapses by neuronal activity ===
In 1973, together with Philippe Courrège and Antoine Danchin, Changeux proposed a model describing how, during development of the nervous system, the activity of a network could cause the stabilization or regression of the synapses involved and illustrated it with the neuromuscular junction. This model is effectively the precursor of the "neural Darwinism" theory further promoted by Gerald Edelman. Changeux later extended and illustrated further this idea. During the 1970s, he tried to document this phenomenon, either by studying mutant animals or by experimental denervation.

=== Nicotinic receptor function ===
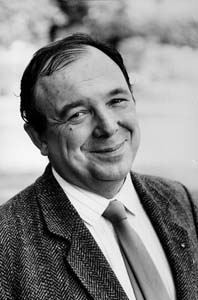
Photo by Erling Mandelmann

While until the 1990s, Changeux's group studied the structure of the nicotinic receptor present in electric organs of electric eel and torpedo, the investigations of the physiological role of those receptors were mostly focussed on two model systems: the nicotinic receptors of the neuromuscular junction, the synapse linking the motorneuron to the skeletal muscle, and the nicotinic receptors of the brain, notably in relation with nicotine addiction.

From the mid-1980s, the group studied the compartimentalisation of the muscle cell upon development, as a model of synaptogenesis and in relation with the theoretical work on epigenesis. In particular, the group focussed on the accumulation of nicotinic receptors in the post-synaptic region upon development, concomitant to a switch of receptor identity. They were able to decrypt the different signalling pathways involved in the response to synaptic activity, showing that the accumulation resulted from an inhibition of gene transcription outside the synaptic region due to electrical activity triggering an uptake of calcium and activation of PKC, and a stimulation of gene transcription at the synapse by the calcitonin gene-related peptide (CGRP) activating PKA and the ARIA (heregulin) activating tyrosine kinase cascades.

The 1990s saw the progressive shift of interest of Changeux from the neuromuscular junction to the nicotinic receptors expressed in the brain. Among the notable achievements of the group is the discovery that neuronal nicotinic receptors are highly permeable to calcium – which explains the positive effect of nicotinic receptors on the release of many neurotransmitters in the brain.

The group also discovered that the nicotinic receptor is regulated by a variety of "allosteric modulators" such as: 1. calcium ions (This was also discovered independently by the group of John Dani), which binding sites were later identified and localized in the extracellular domain, at the interface between subunits (Le Novère et al. 2002); 2. ivermectin which behaves as a potent positive allosteric modulator binding to a site present in the transmembrane domain (where general anesthetics also bind); 3. phosphorylation of the cytoplasmic domain which regulate desensitization.

By the mid-1990s, Changeux concentrated most of his interest on the function of nicotinic receptors in the basal ganglia and in particular the mesencephalic dopaminergic system. Using mice deleted for nicotinic receptor genes, the group characterised the types of receptor subunits present in the dopaminergic cells and identified the receptors mainly responsible of the dependence to nicotine, formed by the subunits α4, α6 and β2.

=== Modeling cognition ===
From the mid-1990s, Changeux developed an activity of computational modeling in order to investigate the neuronal bases of cognitive functions. This research was mainly performed in collaboration with Stanislas Dehaene, now leading the INSERM-CEA Cognitive Neuroimaging Unit. They notably modeled the acquisition of song recognition in birds, the development of numerical abilities, the Wisconsin card sorting task and the Tower of London task.

Following the same trend, Dehaene and Changeux further developed a neuronal model for access to consciousness based on a brain-wide recruitment of networks of neurons with long-range axons, referred to as the global neuronal workspace theory. In the past decades, the theory has received significant confirmation from brain imaging and physiological recordings and tentatively extended to non human species such as Drosophila Clinical applications of the GNW model include the understanding of the mechanism of coma, the action of general anesthetics, drug addiction, and neuropsychiatric diseases.

Changeux's approach manifests the constant emphasis to establish causal links between the molecular and the cognitive level, thus, raising the fundamental issue of artificial consciousness.

=== Origins of the human brain ===
Together with Higletag and Goulas, Changeux has attempted to solve the paradox that the cognitive abilities of the human brain, including have expanded dramatically in the course of our recent evolution from nonhuman primates, despite only minor apparent changes at the gene level. Their “connectomic hypothesis” intends, conceptually, to find a minimal set of principles that allow to understand uniquely human brain architecture in terms of a characteristic neuronal network—connectomic—organization as an anatomical and functional phenotype parsimoniously linking the genome and the cognitive levels with major consequences on large-scale network organization and computations of the brain and, ultimately, human cognition, language, and culture in the course of its epigenetic postnatal complexification.

== Professional and non-scientific activities ==
The publication of his book Neuronal Man: The Biology of The Mind in 1985 brought Changeux celebrity status to the wider public. Since then, he authored or co-authored several other books inspired by his teaching at the College de France: notably, Conversations on Mind Matter and Mathematics with the mathematician Alain Connes (1998), What Makes Us Think with the philosopher Paul Ricoeur (2002) and the Physiology of truth (2002) that are acknowledged as having initiated an instructive dialogue between the two often-hostile disciplines of neuroscience and philosophy. He has also been concerned by the relationships between aesthetic experience and the brain in Raison & Plaisir (1994), The true the good the beautiful: a neurobiological approach (2012) and recently Les neurones enchantés. (2014) where he debates the issue of artistic creation with the music composers Pierre Boulez and Philippe Manoury. Changeux received the Lewis Thomas Prize for Writing about Science, Rockefeller University, New-York, 2005.

Changeux has also been the curator of three major exhibitions on Art and Science: De Nicolo dell'Abate à Nicolas Poussin: aux sources du Classicisme 1550-1650 Musée Bossuet Meaux in 1988, L'Âme au Corps, Arts et Sciences, 1793-1993 (with Gérard Régnier) Galeries nationales du Grand Palais Paris in 1993-1994 and La lumière au siècle des Lumières et aujourd'hui. Art et science : de la biologie de la vision à une nouvelle conception du monde Galeries Poirel Nancy in 2005. Changeux has also chaired the inter-ministry commission for the conservation of the French artistic heritage since 1989, and has been member of the scientific council of the International Agency of museums since 2007.

Last, throughout his career, Changeux has been concerned by the ethical consequences for the city and for the society in general of the recent progress in the Neuroscience. Changeux has headed the National Advisory Committee on Bioethics in France from 1992 to 1998. He organised a scientific conference on the topic, that led to a book he edited, fondements naturel de l'ethique. He is presently the co-chairman of the Ethics and Society division of the European Human Brain Program (since 2013).

He is also on the Board of Scientific Governors of The Scripps Research Institute, an independent not-for profit biomedical research institute.

== Public recognition ==
=== Main scientific prizes and awards ===
- 1978: Gairdner Foundation International Award
- 1982: Wolf Foundation Prize in Medicine
- 1982: Richard Lounsbery Award of the US Academy of Sciences and the French Academy of Sciences
- 1991: Carl-Gustav-Bernhard medal of the Swedish Academy of Science
- 1992: CNRS Gold medal.
- 1993: Louis-Jeantet Prize for Medicine
- 1994: Goodman and Gilman Award in drug receptor pharmacology
- 1995: Max Delbrück Medal
- 1998: Prize Emanuel Merck in Chemistry, Darmstadt
- 1999: ECNP Neuropsychopharmacology Award
- 2001: Balzan Prize for Cognitive Neurosciences
- 2002: American Philosophical Society's Karl Spencer Lashley Award in neuroscience
- 2005: Lewis Thomas Prize for Writing about Science
- 2005: Golden Eurydice Award
- 2007: NAS Award in the Neurosciences from the National Academy of Sciences
- 2012: Japanese Society for the Promotion of Science (JSPS) award for eminent scientists
- 2016: International research award from the Olav Thon Foundation (Oslo)
- 2018: Albert Einstein World Award of Science conferred by the World Cultural Council
- 2018: Goldman-Rakic Prize for Outstanding Achievement in Cognitive Neuroscience
- 2022: Erasmus medal of the Academia Europaea

=== Academic memberships and honorary degrees ===
Deutsche Akademie der Naturforscher Leopoldina zu Halle (Pharmacology), 1974; Académie de Médecine de Turin, 1976; National Academy of Sciences, Washington (US) (foreign associate), 1983; Royal Academy of Sciences, Stockholm, (Sweden) (foreign member), 1985; Académie des Sciences, Paris, 1988; Académie Royale de Médecine de Belgique (Bruxelles) (foreign honorary member), 1988; Academia Europaea (founding member), 1988; American Academy of Arts and Sciences, Boston, (US) (foreign member), 1994; Romanian Academy of Medical Sciences, Bucarest (foreign member), 1996; Institute of Medicine of the National Academies, Washington, (US) (foreign associate), 2000; Istituto Veneto di Scienze, Lettere Ed Arti, Venezia (Italy), 2001; Hungarian Academy of Sciences, Budapest (foreign member associate), 2004; European Academy of Sciences, Bruxelles (member), 2004; International Academy of Humanism; Académie Royale des Sciences, des Lettres & des Beaux-Arts de Belgique (foreign member), 2010; Accademia Nazionale dei Lincei, Rome, (Italy) (foreign member), 2010.

Doctor honoris causa : Universities of Torino, Italy, 1989; Dundee, Scotland, 1992; Geneva, Switzerland, 1994; Stockholm, Sweden, 1994; Liège, Belgium, 1996; Ecole Polytechnique Fédérale of Lausanne, Switzerland, 1996; University of Southern California, Los Angeles, US, 1997; Bath, UK, 1997; Montréal University, Canada, 2000; The Hebrew University of Jerusalem, Israel, 2004; Ohio State University, Columbus, US, 2007; University of Buenos Aires, Argentina, 2010.

Honorary member of Neurosciences Research Program, MIT and Rockefeller University (US), since 1984; Honorary member of the Japanese Biochemical Society, Sendai, Japan, 1985; Honorary member of the American Neurology Association, 1988; Honorary member of University College London, 1990; Membre d'honneur à titre étranger de la Société Belge de Neurologie, Bruxelles, 1991; Member of European Molecular Biology Organization.

=== Non-scientific honors ===
Grand Croix dans l'Ordre de la Légion d'Honneur, 2010; Grand-Croix dans l'Ordre National du Mérite 1995; Commandeur dans l'Ordre des Arts et des Lettres, 1994.

=== Scientific publications of historical significance ===
- Monod, J.; Wyman, J.; Changeux, J. P. (1965). "On the Nature of Allosteric Transitions: A Plausible Model". Journal of Molecular Biology. 12: 88–118. doi:10.1016/S0022-2836(65)80285-6. PMID 14343300. (in which Jacques Monod, Jeffries Wyman and Jean-Pierre Changeux presented the concerted model of allosteric transitions, that explained the cooperativity exhibited by many allosteric proteins, such as hemoglobin)
- Changeux J.-P., Kasai M., Huchet M., Meunier J.-C. (1970). Extraction à partir du tissu électrique de gymnote d'une protéine présentant plusieurs propriétés caractéristiques du récepteur physiologique de l'acétylcholine. C. R. Acad. Sci. 270D: 2864–2867. (the first purification of a neurotransmitter receptor. Since the article is in French, most people quote the description of the toxin that allowed the receptor to be identified: Changeux, J.; Kasai, M.; Lee, C. (1970). "Use of a snake venom toxin to characterize the cholinergic receptor protein". Proceedings of the National Academy of Sciences of the United States of America. 67 (3): 1241–1247. Bibcode:1970PNAS...67.1241C. doi:10.1073/pnas.67.3.1241. PMC 283343. PMID 5274453.
- Changeux, J.; Courrège, P.; Danchin, A. (1973). "A theory of the epigenesis of neuronal networks by selective stabilization of synapses". Proceedings of the National Academy of Sciences of the United States of America. 70 (10): 2974–2978. Bibcode:1973PNAS...70.2974C. doi:10.1073/pnas.70.10.2974. PMC 427150. PMID 4517949. (In which the authors develop a formal model of synapse selection, precursor of the "neural darwinism". This is the original work, although most people quote the subsequent review [better suited to a non-specialist audience and presenting the biological context]: Changeux JP, Danchin A (1976) Nature, 264 (1976) 705–712.)
- Dehaene, S.; Kerszberg, M.; Changeux, J.-P.. (1998). "A neuronal model of a global workspace in effortful cognitive tasks". Proceedings of the National Academy of Sciences of the United States of America. 95 (24): 14529–14534. doi:10.1073/pnas.95.24.14529. PMC 24407. PMID 9826734. (The founding paper of the Global Neuronal Workspace theory on the neural bases of conscious processing.)

== Books by Jean-Pierre Changeux ==
- Changeux, Jean-Pierre. (2008) Du vrai, du beau, du bien : Une nouvelle approche neuronale
- Changeux, Jean-Pierre; Stuart Edelstein. (2004) Nicotinic Acetylcholine Receptors: From Molecular Biology to Cognition
- Changeux, Jean-Pierre. (2002) L'homme de verite (2004 The physiology of truth)
- Changeux, Jean-Pierre; Paul Ricœur. (1998) Ce qui nous fait penser (2002 What Makes Us Think. A Neuroscientist and a Philosopher Argue About Ethics, Human Nature, and the Brain)
- Changeux, Jean-Pierre. (1994) Raison et plaisir
- Changeux, Jean-Pierre; Alain Connes. (1989) Matière à pensée (1995 Conversations on Mind, Matter and Mathematics)
- Changeux, Jean-Pierre. (1983) L'homme neuronal (1985 Neuronal Man: The Biology of Mind)
