= Circolo Matematico di Palermo =

Italian mathematical society

The Circolo Matematico di Palermo (Mathematical Circle of Palermo) is an Italian mathematical society, founded in Palermo by Sicilian geometer Giovanni B. Guccia in 1884. It began accepting foreign members in 1888, and by the time of Guccia's death in 1914 it had become the foremost international mathematical society, with approximately one thousand members. However, subsequently to that time it declined in influence.

== Publications ==
Rendiconti del Circolo Matematico di Palermo
- Discipline: Mathematics
- Language: English
- Edited by: C. Ciliberto; G. Dal Maso; Pasquale Vetro

Publication details
- History: Series 1: 1888–1941; Series 2: 1952—
- Publisher: Springer Science+Business Media (since 2008) (Italy)
- Frequency: Triannual
- Open access: limited

Standard abbreviations
- ISO 4: Rend. Circ. Mat. Palermo

Indexing
- ISSN: 0009-725X (print); 1973-4409 (web)

Links
- Journal homepage

Rendiconti del Circolo Matematico di Palermo, the journal of the society, was published in a first series from 1885 to 1941 and in a second ongoing series beginning in 1952. Since 2008 it has been published by Springer Science+Business Media; current editors are C Ciliberto, G. Dal Maso, and Pasquale Vetro.

Influential papers published in the Rendiconti include Henri Poincaré's On the Dynamics of the Electron (1906). The Rendiconti also provided the introduction of normal numbers, the original publications of the Plancherel theorem and Carathéodory's theorem, Hermann Weyl's proof of the equidistribution theorem, and one of the appendices to Henri Poincaré's "Analysis Situs".
