= Jeffries Wyman (biologist) =

Biologist (1901–1995)

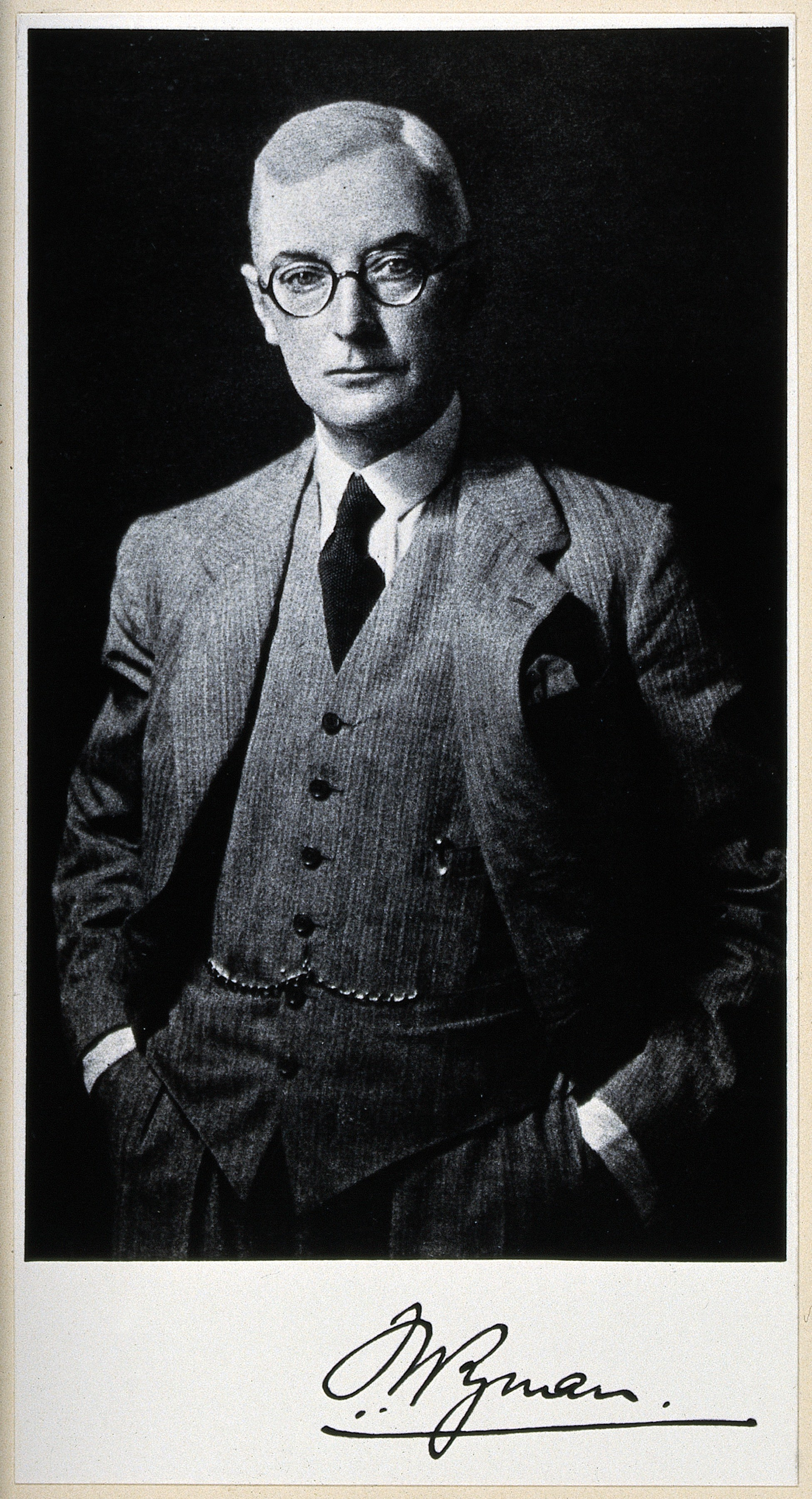
- Born: June 21, 1901; Newton, Massachusetts, U.S.
- Died: November 4, 1995 (aged 94); Paris, France
- Education: Harvard University (BA); University College London (PhD)
- Children: Anne Cabot Wyman; Jeffries Wyman Jr
- Scientific career
- Fields: Molecular biology
- Workplaces: Harvard University; Embassy of the United States, Paris; European Molecular Biology Organization

Jeffries Wyman (June 21, 1901 – November 4, 1995) was an American molecular biologist and biophysicist notable for his research of proteins, amino acids, and on the physical chemistry of hemoglobin, including the classic Monod–Wyman–Changeux model.

== Life ==
Wyman was born in West Newton, Massachusetts, in 1901. He graduated summa cum laude from Harvard College in 1923 with a degree in philosophy and biology. He then received a Ph.D. from University College London. He was a professor of biology at Harvard University (1928–1951), director of a regional science office in the Middle East for Unesco (1955–1958), and a scientist at the Regina Elena and the Biochemistry Institute of the Sapienza University of Rome (1958–1984) before retiring. He died in Paris, France, in 1995.

Wyman was a member of the National Academy of Sciences and of the American Academy of Arts and Sciences, the first scientific advisor to the US Embassy in Paris, director of a regional science office in the Middle East for UNESCO, a founder and past secretary general of the European Molecular Biology Organization, professor of biology at Harvard. Harvard University established the Jeffries Wyman Fellowship in his name.

== See also ==
- Gaetano Fichera
