= Giovanni Battista Guccia =

Italian mathematician

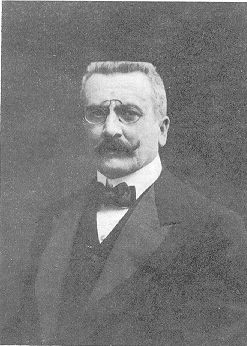
- Born: 21 October 1855; Palermo
- Died: 29 October 1914 (aged 59); Palermo
- Education: University of Rome
- Known for: Mathematical Circle of Palermo
- Scientific career
- Fields: Mathematics
- Workplaces: University of Palermo
- Doctoral advisor: Luigi Cremona

Giovanni Battista Guccia (21 October 1855 – 29 October 1914) was an Italian mathematician.

== Biography ==
Guccia was born in Palermo in a rich and aristocratic family. He graduated in mathematics in 1880 at the University of Rome, where he was a student of Luigi Cremona. His doctoral thesis was presented at the Reims scientific congress and then published with the title "On a class of surfaces representable point by point on a plane" in the "Comptes-rendus de l'Association française pour l'avancement des sciences". In 1887 the French journal Comptes Rendus published his article "Theorem on the singular points of an algebraic surface".

In 1889, having applied for a chair, he was appointed full professor of geometry at the University of Palermo, a position which he held for the rest of his life.

In 1884 he founded, personally contributing both financially and intellectually, the "Circolo Matematico di Palermo" (Mathematical Society of Palermo). The Circolo produced a journal called Rendiconti del Circolo di Palermo that attracted quality manuscripts from mathematicians. Michele Gebbia (1854-1929), Giovanni Maisano (1851-1929), Michele Luigi Albeggiani (1852-1943) and Francesco Paolo Paternò (1852-1927) were instrumental in assisting Guccia in bringing the Rendiconti to press.

Guccia was the Mathematical Society's director and essence until his death.

His scientific work consists of about 50 papers on algebraic geometry, in particular Cremona transformations, classification of curves and projective properties of curves.
