= Fueter =

Fueter is a surname. Notable people with the surname include:

- Christian Fueter (1752–1844), Swiss medalist and mint-master
- Daniel Christian Fueter (1720–1785), Swiss-American silversmith and medalist
- Heinrich Fueter (1911–1979), Swiss film producer
- Lewis Fueter (1746–1784), American silversmith
- Rudolf Fueter (1880–1950), Swiss mathematician

== See also ==
- Fueter–Pólya theorem, Mathematical theorem
