= Dumas (surname) =

Dumas is a Southern French topographic surname, with fused preposition and definite article du, for someone who lived in an isolated dwelling in the country rather than in a village, from Occitan mas 'farmstead' (Late Latin mansum, mansus).

People surnamed Dumas include:

- Adolphe Dumas (1805–1861), French poet.
- Alexandre Dumas, père (1802–1870), French novelist and author of The Three Musketeers and The Count of Monte Cristo
- Alexandre Dumas, fils (1824–1895), son of the above and also a novelist, author of The Lady of the Camellias
- Amy Dumas (born 1975), former professional wrestler better known as "Lita"
- Axel Dumas (born 1970), French billionaire, CEO of Hermès
- Bullet Dumas (born 1986), Filipino musician
- Caroline Dumas (born 1935), French soprano
- Charles Dumas (disambiguation), multiple people
- Daniel Dumas (born 1983), Australian rugby player
- Dominique Dumas, Quebec radio host and politician
- Dumas (musician) (born 1979), Canadian musician born Steve Dumas
- Fernand Dumas (1892–1956), Swiss architect
- Franck Dumas (born 1968), French football player and manager
- Frédéric Dumas (1913–1991), one of the first two diving companions of Jacques-Yves Cousteau
- Georges Dumas (1866–1946), French physician and psychologist
- Gilles Dumas, French rugby league footballer and coach
- Guillaume-Mathieu Dumas, comte Dumas (1753–1837), French general
- Gustave Dumas (1872–1955), Swiss mathematician
- Henry Dumas (1934–1968), African-American poet and author
- Jean-Baptiste Dumas (1800–1884), French chemist
- Joseph Dumas (1875–1950), Canadian politician
- Lloyd J. Dumas (born 1945), American macroeconomist
- Marlene Dumas (born 1953), South African artist
- Maurice Dumas (1927–2015), Canadian professor and politician
- Mireille Dumas (born 1953), French journalist
- Pierre Dumas (died 2000), French doctor
- Pierre Benoît Dumas (1668–1745), French Governor General of Pondicherry and Réunion
- René-François Dumas (1753–1794) a French revolutionary lawyer
- Rennie Dumas (died 2017), Trinidad and Tobago politician
- Richard Dumas (born 1969), American basketball player
- Roger Dumas, multiple people
- Roland Dumas (1922–2024), French politician and lawyer
- Romain Dumas (born 1977), French racing driver
- Russell Dumas (1887–1975), Australian engineer and public servant
- Sidonie Dumas (born 1967), French film producer
- Stephanie Summerow Dumas, the first African-American woman elected as a county commissioner in the history of Ohio
- Tancrède Dumas (1830–1905), Italian photographer
- Thomas-Alexandre Dumas (1762–1806), general of the French Revolution and father of the novelist Alexandre Dumas, père
- Tony Dumas (born 1972), American basketball player
- Vito Dumas (1900–1965), Argentine single-handed sailor

== See also ==
- Edward Canfor-Dumas (born 1957), English TV scriptwriter and novelist
