= Johann Jakob Burckhardt =

Swiss mathematician and crystallographer (1903–2006)

Johann Jakob Burckhardt (13 July 1903 – 5 November 2006) was a Swiss mathematician and crystallographer. He was an invited speaker at the International Congress of Mathematicians in 1936 in Oslo.

== Biography ==
Johann Jakob Burckhardt was born on 13 July 1903 in Basel. He came from an old Basel family. His ancestors include a brother (Hieronimus) of Jacob Bernoulli and Johann Bernoulli. The son of a lawyer and legal advisor to the German consulate in Basel, J. J. Burckhardt attended in Basel the Gymnasium am Münsterplatz (the second oldest Gymnasium in Switzerland) and the Oberrealschule. In 1922, he matriculated at the University of Basel.

He studied in 1923 in the summer semester at the Ludwig-Maximilians-Universität München, where Arnold Sommerfeld, Oskar Perron, Friedrich Hartogs and Wilhelm Wien taught, and in 1924 at the University of Hamburg, where Hans Rademacher and Erich Hecke taught.

Inspired by reading Andreas Speiser's group theory textbook, which includes applications to crystallography and decorative ornaments, Burckhardt continued his studies in 1924 at the University of Zurich. There he heard lectures by Andreas Speiser, Rudolf Fueter, Erwin Schrödinger, and the astronomer Alfred Wolfer (1854–1931). At ETH Zurich Burckhardt listened to Hermann Weyl, George Pólya (whose seminar he attended), and the mineralogist Paul Niggli. Buckhardt also studied crystallography with Leonhard Weber (1883–1968).

In 1927 Burckhardt passed the qualifying examination for teaching in higher education and received his doctorate in mathematics with advisor Andreas Speiser and thesis Die Algebren der Diedergruppen (The algebras of dihedral groups). In late 1927, he continued his studies at the University of Paris with Jacques Hadamard and then in 1928 at the University of Göttingen, where he attended the seminars of Emmy Noether and Richard Courant and heard Gustav Herglotz's lectures on geometry. At the University of Göttingen, he also met Bartel Leendert van der Waerden and Otto Neugebauer, both of whom later became well-known mathematicians. At the University of Zurich, van der Waerden and Burckhardt later became colleagues.

Since he did not like the political climate with the advent of the National Socialists in Germany, he declined the offer of an assistant position in Göttingen and went back to Basel, where he was an assistant teacher at the lower Realschule. He then moved to the University of Zurich as Fueter's assistant.

After Burckhardt habilitated in 1933 at the University of Zurich with the work Zur Theorie der Bewegungsgruppen (Theory of space groups), he was a Vertreter (visiting teacher) at the Zurich University of Applied Sciences/ZHAW and at the Höhere Töchterschule der Stadt Zürich (later renamed the Kantonsschule Hohe Promenade). He declined a professorship at the University of Cairo. In 1942, he was a Titularprofessor (honorary professor) at the University of Zurich. In 1943/1944 he was a Lehrstuhlvertreter (visiting professor) in the professorial chair of Otto Spiess (1878–1966) at the University of Basel. From 1945 until his retirement in 1970, Burckhardt was an Oberassistent (senior assistant) at the Mathematical Institute of the University of Zurich.

Burckhardt died on 5 November 2006 in Zürich.

Burckhardt was an honorary member of the Swiss Mathematical Society, of which he was the president from 1954 to 1955. He also served as the president of the Naturforschende Gesellschaft in Zürich.

He was an avid hiker and mountaineer.

== Research and other work ==
Burckhardt is known for his derivation of the crystallographic space groups, the subject of a standard work written by him. The 230 spaces groups had been published in 1888 by Schoenflies and, independently, in 1891 by Fedorov. The two-dimensional case had been dealt with mathematically by Pólya and Niggli in 1924. Burckhardt solved the three-dimensional case mathematically in the 1930s, that is, he specified an algebraic determination method. He used the results of Frobenius and Bieberbach on space groups in n-dimensional spaces and introduced the concept of the Arithmetische Kristallklasse (arithmetic crystal class). His method can also be used in higher dimensions.

At the urging of Speiser and Fueter, Burckhardt wrote a description of the set theory of Paul Finsler. This was done at the suggestion of Fueter and Speiser in order to explain Finsler's mostly obscure ideas to other mathematicians in an understandable way.

Burckhardt also published on the history of mathematics. Among his other works on the history of mathematics, he dealt with the mathematics of Ludwig Schläfli and was a member of the Steiner-Schläfli Committee, responsible for publishing Schläfli's collected works. Burckhardt wrote the article about Schläfli for the Dictionary of Scientific Biography and a biography of Schläfli for the journal Elemente der Mathematik.

In addition to his studies concerning Schläfli, he wrote mathematical biographies for the Neue Deutsche Biographie and the Dictionary of Scientific Biography on Fueter, Marcel Grossmann, Heinz Hopf, Karl Heinrich Gräffe, Ferdinand Rudio, Carl Friedrich Geiser, Rudolf Wolf, and Jakob Steiner.

Burckhardt investigated (partly with van der Waerden) medieval Islamic astronomers' writings (such as the planet tables of Al-Khwarizmi.).

He was a member from 1957 to 1975 of the Swiss Euler Commission (1952-1975), whose vice president he was from 1957 to 1975. He was the editor, with Karl Matter and Edmund Hoppe, of volume III/2, Rechenkunst (Geneva 1942), of Euler's collected works. In this context, he edited some of Euler's physical treatises and was involved in the compilation of the list of correspondence (Series IV A, Volume 1, 1975).

From 1950 to 1982 he was an editor of the Commentarii Mathematici Helvetici.

Burckhardt also wrote a book on the history of crystallography and essays on the history of the discovery of space groups by Schoenflies and Fedorov. In 1966 he published a facsimile reprint of Ulrich Wagner's 1483 Bamberger Rechenbuch (Bamberg arithmetic book), of which he had access to a copy in the Zentralbibliothek Zürich. (Only two copies of the 1483 edition are known. The other copy is in Zwickau.)

Burckhardt also worked as a translator. He, in collaboration with Emil Schubarth, translated Leonard Dickson's 1923 Algebras and their arithmetics into German as Algebren und ihre Zahlentheorie (Orell Füssli, Zürich 1927) — as an assignment from Andreas Speiser. Dickson's book had a big influence on the development of algebraic theory and algebraic number theory in Germany. Burckhardt translated the well-known 1961 geometry textbook Introduction to Geometry by Coxeter into German as Unvergängliche Geometrie (Birkhäuser, Basel 1963) with new & revised 2nd edition in 1981.

== Selected publications ==
- Die Bewegungsgruppen der Kristallographie. Birkhäuser, Basel 1947; new & revised 2nd edition. 1966.
- Ludwig Schläfli: 1814 - 1895. In: Elemente der Mathematik, Beiheft (Supplement) 4, 1948, Online
- Lesebuch zur Mathematik. Quellen von Euklid bis heute. Räber, Luzern 1968.
- Die Mathematik an der Universität Zürich 1916–1950 unter den Professoren R. Fueter, A. Speiser, P. Finsler. In: Elemente der Mathematik. Beiheft (Supplement) 16, 1980, Online.
- as editor with Emil Fellmann, Walter Habicht: Leonhard Euler 1707–1783. Beiträge zu Leben und Werk. Gedenkband des Kantons Basel-Stadt. Birkhäuser, Basel 1983 (The book contains Burkhardt's article Die Euler-Kommission der Schweizerischen Naturforschenden Gesellschaft – ein Beitrag zur Editionsgeschichte, pp. 501–510, and Burckhardt's article Euleriana – Verzeichnis des Schrifttums über Leonhard Euler, pp. 511–552).
- Die Symmetrie der Kristalle. Von René-Just Haüy zur kristallographischen Schule in Zürich. (The symmetry of crystals from René-Just Haüy to the crystallographic school in Zurich) With a contribution from Erhard Scholz). Birkhäuser, Basel 1988. (See René-Just Haüy.)

== Sources ==
- Günther Frei: Johann Jakob Burckhardt zum hundertsten Geburtstag am 13. Juli 2003. In: Elemente der Mathematik. vol. 58, 2003, pp. 134–140, doi:10.5169/seals-8491 (The issue of Elemente der Mathematik is dedicated to Burkhardt.)
- Ralph Strebel: Burckhardtsche Bestimmung der Raumgruppen I. In: Elemente der Mathematik. vol. 58, 2003, pp. 141–155, doi:10.5169/seals-8492.
- Ralph Strebel: Burckhardtsche Bestimmung der Raumgruppen II. In: Elemente der Mathematik. vol. 59, 2004, pp. 1–18, doi:10.5169/seals-9305.
