= Carl Friedrich Geiser =

Swiss mathematician (1843–1934)

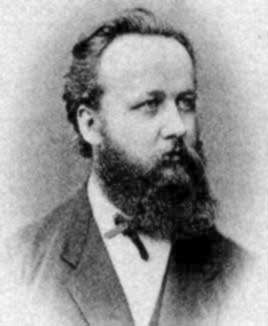
Carl Friedrich Geiser

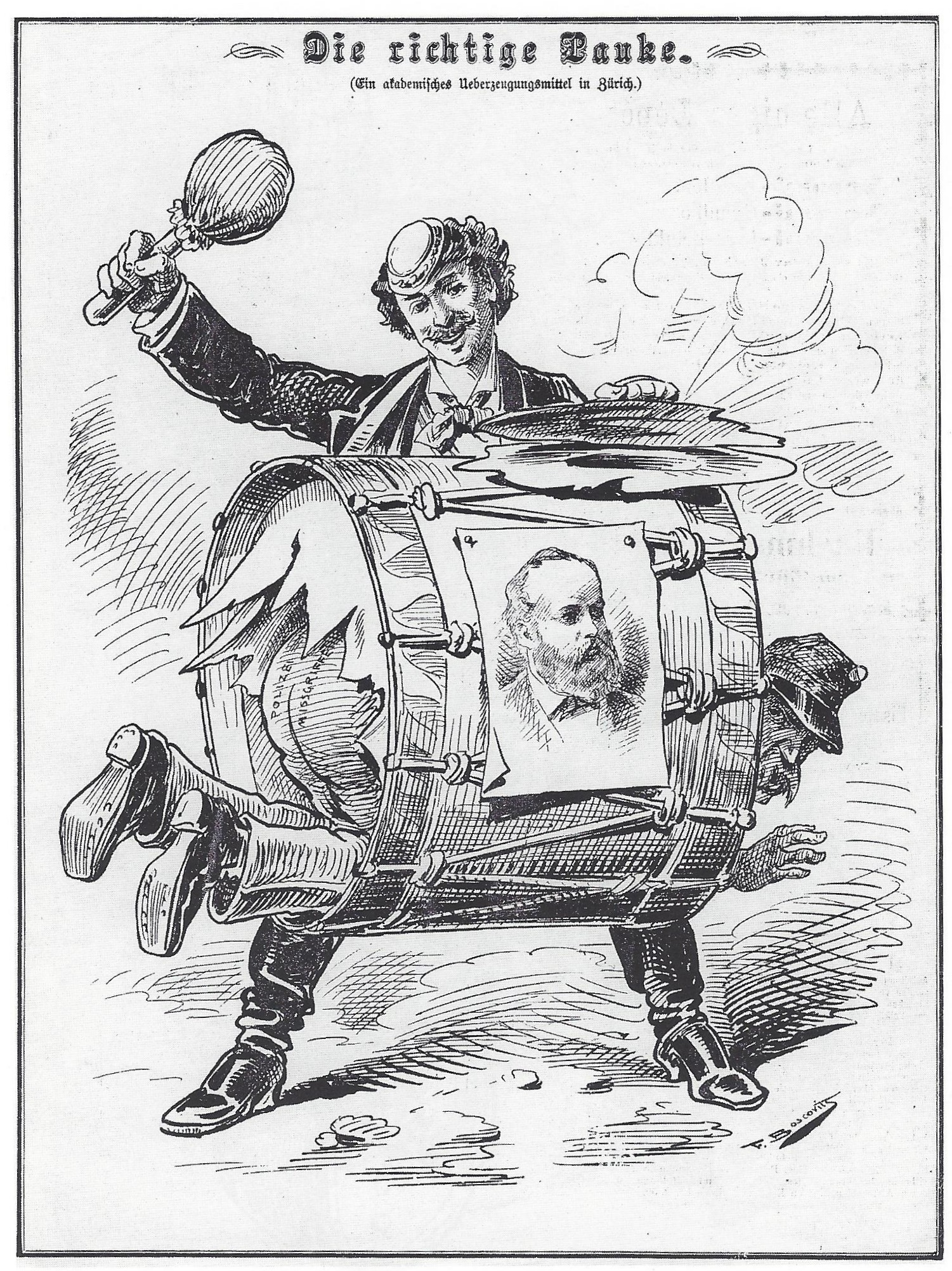
Caricature of Geiser in the snare drum

Carl Friedrich Geiser (26 February 1843, Langenthal – 7 March 1934, Küsnacht) was a Swiss mathematician, specializing in algebraic geometry. He is known for the Geiser involution and Geiser's minimal surface.

== Education and career ==
Geiser's father was a butcher and innkeeper. The famous Swiss mathematician Jakob Steiner was Carl F. Geiser's great-uncle. Geiser studied for four semesters from 1859 to 1861 at the Zürich Polytechnikum and then went to Berlin for four semesters from 1861 to 1863 to study under Karl Weierstrass and Leopold Kronecker. Since the support from his parents was not sufficient, he gave private lessons to students, some of whom were found for him by Weierstrass and Kronecker. He graduated in 1863 and returned to Switzerland as a Privatdozent at Zürich Polytechnikum. He pursued graduate studies at the University of Bern with doctorate (Promotion) in 1866 under Ludwig Schläfli with dissertation Beiträge zur synthetischen Geometrie. At the Zürich Polytechnikum, Geiser, together with Theodor Reye, temporarily fulfilled the duties of a professorial chair upon the death of Joseph Wolfgang von Deschwanden (1819–1866), until the professorial chair was given in 1867 to Wilhelm Fiedler. Geiser had already fulfilled the habilitation requirements in 1863; at the Zürich Polytechnikum, he was appointed from 1863 to 1869 a Privatdozent for pure and applied mathematics, from 1869 to 1873 a professor extraordinarius, and from 1873 to 1913 a professor ordinarius for higher mathematics and synthetic geometry. From 1881 to 1887 and from 1891 to 1895 Geiser was the director of the Zürich Polytechnikum.

Geiser taught algebraic geometry, differential geometry, and the theory of invariants. He published research on algebraic geometry and minimal surfaces.

Albert Einstein was a student at the Zürich Polytechnikum from October 1896 until he graduated in July 1900. He attended some of Geiser's lectures and towards the end of his life recalled his fascination with Geiser's Infinitesimalgeometrie course. In this course Geiser taught the Gaussian theory of surfaces and, in 1912, Einstein had what he described as "the decisive idea" of an analogy between general relativity and Gaussian surfaces.

In addition to his research results, Geiser's participation in the development of Switzerland's education system is remarkable. He was helped by his relationships (partly due to his family connection with Jakob Steiner) with eminent politicians and mathematicians. Geiser published previously unpublished lecture notes and treatises from Steiner's Nachlass. Geiser and Ferdinand Rudio were two of the main organizers of the International Congress of Mathematicians in 1897 in Zürich.

Geiser was elected in 1888 a foreign member of the German Academy of Sciences Leopoldina. He was elected an honorary member of the Swiss Mathematical Society at its session in 1911–1912.

=== Monographs ===
- as editor: Die Theorie der Kegelschnitte in elementarer Darstellung. Auf Grund von Universitätsvorträgen und mit Benutzung hinterlassener Manuscripte Jacob Steiner’s, B. G. Teubner, Leipzig 1867 (first part Jacob Steiner’s Vorlesungen über synthetische Geometrie; Google Books, ditto, ditto)
- Einleitung in die synthetische Geometrie. Ein Leitfaden beim Unterrichte an höheren Realschulen und Gymnasien, B. G. Teubner, Leipzig 1869 (Internet-Archiv; Jahrbuch-Bericht)

=== Articles ===
- Ueber eine geometrische Verwandtschaft des zweiten Grades, Mittheilungen der naturforschenden Gesellschaft in Bern 580–602, 1865, pp. 97–107
- Ueber die Normalen der Kegelschnitte, Journal für die reine und angewandte Mathematik 65, 1866, pp. 381–383 (Google Books, ditto)
- Ueber zwei geometrische Probleme, Journal für die reine und angewandte Mathematik 67, 1867, pp. 78–89 (Google Books)
- as editor: Construction der Fläche zweiten Grades durch neun Punkte. (Nach den hinterlassenen Manuscripten Jacob Steiners dargestellt von Herrn C. F. Geiser in Zürich.) Journal für die reine und angewandte Mathematik 68, 1868, pp. 191–192 (Google Books, ditto)
- Zur Theorie der Flächen zweiten und dritten Grades, Journal für die reine und angewandte Mathematik 69, 1868, pp. 197–221 (Google Books)
- Ueber die Doppeltangenten einer ebenen Curve vierten Grades, Mathematische Annalen 1, 1869, pp. 129–138 (Jahrbuch-Bericht)
- Ueber die Flächen vierten Grades, welche eine Doppelcurve zweiten Grades haben, Journal für die reine und angewandte Mathematik 70, 1869, pp. 249–257 (Jahrbuch-Bericht)
- Ueber die Steinerschen Sätze von den Doppeltangenten der Curven vierten Grades, Journal für die reine und angewandte Mathematik 72, 1870, pp. 370–378 (Jahrbuch-Bericht)
- Notiz über die algebraischen Minimumsflächen, Mathematische Annalen 3, 1871, pp. 530–534 (Jahrbuch-Bericht)
- Zum Hauptaxenproblem der Flächen zweiten Grades, Journal für die reine und angewandte Mathematik 82, 1877, pp. 47–53
- Ueber einen fundamentalen Satz aus der kinematischen Geometrie des Raumes, Journal für die reine und angewandte Mathematik 90, 1881, pp. 39–43 (Jahrbuch-Bericht)

== Sources ==
- † Prof. Dr. C. F. Geiser, Schweizerische Bauzeitung 103, 17 March 1934
- Henri Fehr: C.-F. Geiser, L’Enseignement Mathématique 32, 1933, pp. 410–411
- Louis Kollros: † Prof. Dr. Carl Friedrich Geiser, Schweizerische Bauzeitung 103, 31 March 1934, pp. 157–158
- Arnold Emch: Carl Friedrich Geiser, National Mathematics Magazine 12, 1938, pp. 286–289 doi:10.2307/3028591
- Johann Jakob Burckhardt (1964). "Geiser. Karl Friedrich". Neue Deutsche Biographie (in German). Vol. 6. Berlin: Duncker & Humblot. pp. 154–155. (full text online).
