= Gustave Juvet =

Swiss mathematician (1896–1936)

Gustave Juvet (born 25 September 1896, La Côte-aux-Fées, Neuchâtel – 2 April 1936, Valais) was a Swiss mathematician. He made contributions to relativity theory, quantum mechanics, and cosmology. He authored the first comprehensive French treatise on tensor calculus in 1922, and his work on Clifford algebras and spinors between 1930 and 1935 anticipated unified geometric approaches to physics that would later become influential in theoretical physics.

== Biography ==
Juvet received his licence in mathematical sciences from the University of Neuchâtel in 1917 and then the same degree from the Sorbonne in 1919. He taught astronomy and geodesy from 1920 to 1928 at the University of Neuchâtel. In 1928 he became a professor at the University of Lausanne, where he retained his academic position until his unexpected death from a heart attack in 1936. In 1926 he received his doctorate from the Faculté des sciences de Paris.

Juvet was a person of very wide interests; in mathematics, he can be characterized as a mathematical physicist interested in relativity theory, quantum mechanics, and cosmology. He had translated Hermann Weyl's Raum, Zeit, Materie (1st edition 1918) into French already in 1922 (with R. Leroy) and was a prolific author who had mastered the Levi-Civita tensor calculus fairly early in his career (in Paris).

He was an Invited Speaker at the ICM in 1928 in Bologna and in 1932 in Zürich. For the two years 1932 and 1933 he was the President of the Swiss Mathematical Society.

In adolescence, while attending Neuchâtel's gymnasium, he was a close friend of Jean Piaget (who became a famous psychologist) and Rolin Wavre (who became a prominent mathematician). Juvet married in 1925.

In 1922, Juvet published Introduction au calcul tensoriel et au calcul différentiel absolu, the first comprehensive French treatise on tensor and absolute differential calculus, establishing his reputation in the early development of relativity studies in France. From 1927 to 1928, in collaboration with Ferdinand Gonseth, he advanced five-dimensional extensions of general relativity and electromagnetism—applying Kaluza–Klein theory to the metric structure of spacetime and to the Schrödinger equation. Between 1930 and 1935, he authored seminal papers on Clifford algebras (including Opérateurs de Dirac et équations de Maxwell and works on spinors), anticipating unified geometric approaches to physics later known as geometrodynamics. His analyses of axiomatic geometry and structural methods in modern physical theories were cited by Gaston Bachelard and Albert Lautman, reflecting Juvet's influence on the philosophical foundations of twentieth-century science.

== See also ==
- Spinor

== Selected publications ==
=== Articles ===
- "Sur le déplacement parallèle le plus général et sur l'étude des courbes tracées dans une multiplicité quelconque" (PDF). Bulletin de la Société Mathématique de France. 53: 60–74. 1925.
- "Sur une équation aux dérivées fonctionnelles partielles et sur une généralisation du théorème de Jacobi" (PDF). Thèses Françaises de l'Entre-deux-guerres. 69. 1926; iii+54 pages
- with Ferdinand Gonseth: "Sur la relativité à cinq dimensions et sur une interprétation de l'équation de Schrödinger" (PDF). Helvetica Physica Acta. 1 (Fasc. 6): 421–436. 1928. Archived from the original (PDF) on 2017-02-10.
- Juvet, G. (1930). "Opérateurs de Dirac et équations de Maxwell". Commentarii Mathematici Helvetici. 2 (1): 225–235. doi:10.1007/BF01214461. S2CID 121226923.
- Juvet, G. (1931). "Sur quelques solutions des équations cosmologiques de la relativité". Commentarii Mathematici Helvetici. 3 (1): 154–172. doi:10.1007/BF01601809. S2CID 122263046.
- Juvet, Gustave (1935). "Les rotations de l'espace euclidien à quatre dimensions, leur expression au moyen des nombres de Clifford et leurs relations avec la théorie des spineurs". Commentarii Mathematici Helvetici. 8 (1): 264–304. doi:10.1007/BF01199558. S2CID 122390327.

=== Books ===
- Introduction au calculus tensoriel et au calculus différentiel absolu. Paris: A. Blanchard. 1922.
- Mécanique analytique et théorie des quanta. Paris: A. Blanchard. 1926.
- Structure des nouvelles théories physiques. Paris: Félix Alcan. 1933.
- Leçons d'analyse vectorielle, I. Paris: Gauthier-Villars. 1933.
- Leçons d'analyse vectorielle, II. Paris: Gauthier-Villars. 1935.
- Mécanique analytique et mécanique ondulatoire. Paris: Gauthier-Villars. 1937.
