= Swiss Mathematical Society =

Swiss learned society for mathetics

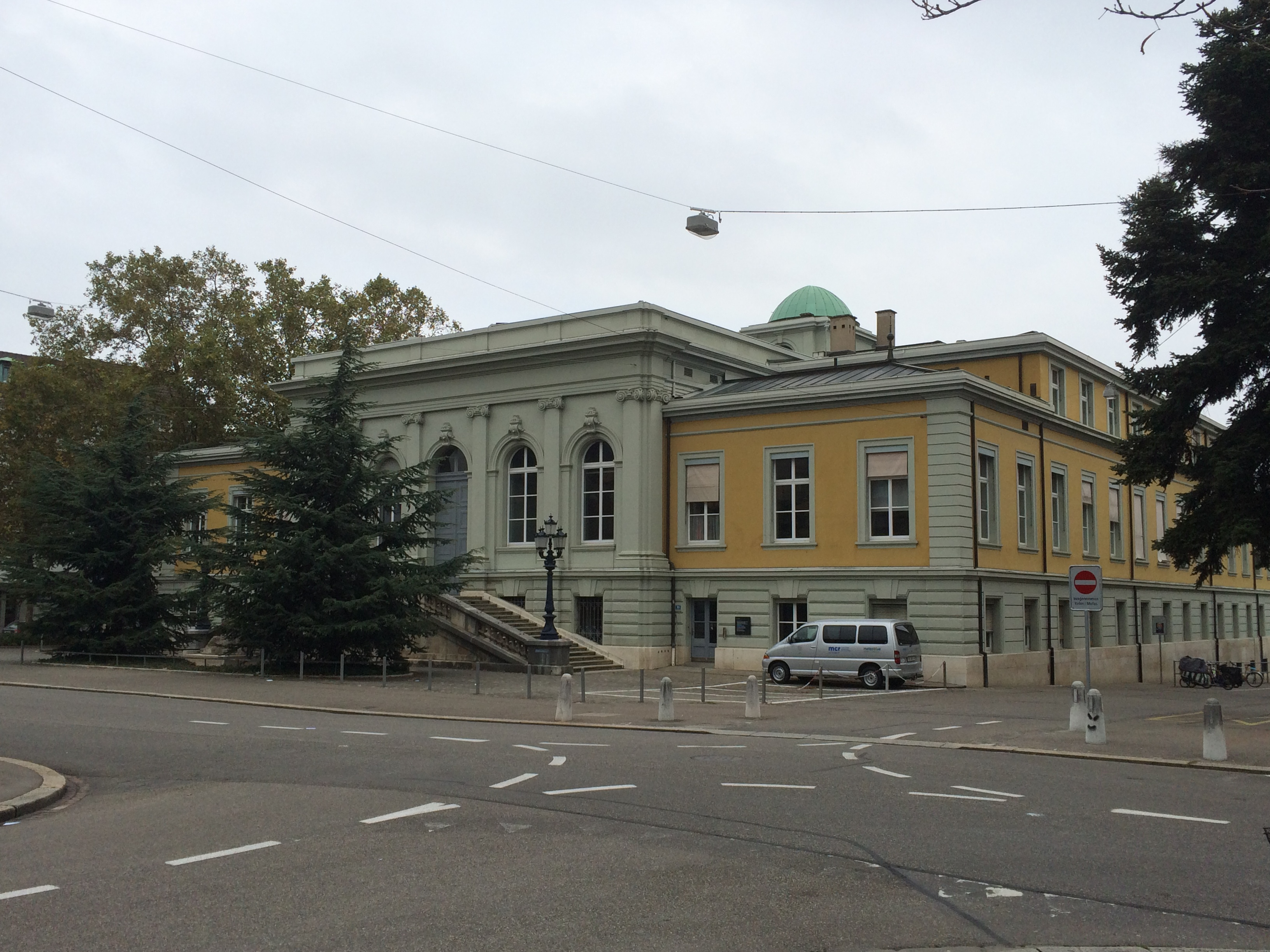
The Bernoullianum in Basel, October 2015

The Swiss Mathematical Society, SMS (German: Schweizerische Mathematische Gesellschaft, SMG; French: Société Mathématique Suisse), founded in Basel on 4 September 1910, is the national mathematical society of Switzerland. It is a member of the European Mathematical Society and of the International Mathematical Union.

== History ==
The SMS was established on 4 September 1910 in Basel as a specialised section of the Swiss Natural Research Society (SNG). Initiated by Rudolf Fueter, Henri Fehr and Marcel Grossmann, a circular signed by nineteen leading mathematicians drew eighty-two founding members, and the constitutive meeting was held that afternoon in the Bernoullianum. From its earliest years the SMG organised annual spring and autumn sectional meetings—initially within the SNG framework—at which members presented research and exchange of ideas. Membership fees began at CHF 2 per annum (later rising in stages and, from 2007, incorporating a reduced student rate) and the Society's governing statutes provided for a rotating presidency via an executive of three elected officers.

In 1928 the SMG resolved to launch its own research journal, Commentarii Mathematici Helvetici, with the first volume appearing that same year. To secure its continuation a "Foundation for the Promotion of Mathematical Sciences in Switzerland" was established in 1929 to underwrite production costs. In 1946 the Society founded Elemente der Mathematik, aimed at expository articles and developments in mathematical education and dissemination. Both journals—renowned today for their high scientific standards and broader pedagogical reach—were transferred in 1976 to Society oversight (Elemente) and more recently adopted modern typesetting (TeX) and online distribution via the EMS Publishing House. The SMG also maintains an information and exchange service, publishes a weekly bulletin of seminars and lectures, and awards travel grants to support scholarly collaboration.

Beyond its national activities, the SMG has long represented Switzerland in international bodies. It was an early member society of the European Mathematical Society upon its founding in 1990 and holds membership in the International Mathematical Union (since 1921) and the International Council for Industrial and Applied Mathematics. Swiss mathematicians have twice hosted the International Congress of Mathematicians in Zürich (1932 and 1994), and SMG officers have served as IMU presidents and secretaries. Today, the Society's archives—housed at the ETH Library, Zürich—comprise nearly four linear metres of minutes, correspondence and financial records, providing a comprehensive record of one hundred years of Swiss mathematical endeavour.

== Presidents ==
- 1910–12 Rudolf Fueter
- 1913–15 Henri Fehr
- 1916–17 Marcel Grossmann (ETH Zurich)
- 1918–19 Michel Plancherel
- 1920–21 Louis Crelier
- 1922–23 Gustave Dumas (University of Lausanne)
- 1924–25 Andreas Speiser
- 1926–27 Ferdinand Gonseth (Bern)
- 1928–29 Severin Bays (Fribourg)
- 1930–31 Samuel Dumas (Bern)
- 1932–33 Gustave Juvet (University of Lausanne)
- 1934–35 Walter Saxer (ETH Zurich)
- 1936–37 Rolin Wavre
- 1938–39 Willy Scherrer (Bern)
- 1940–41 Louis Kollros (ETH Zurich)
- 1942–43 Paul Buchner (Basel)
- 1944–45 Georges de Rham
- 1946–47 Max Gut (Universität Zurich)
- 1948–49 Charles Blanc (University of Lausanne)
- 1950–51 Albert Pfluger
- 1952–53 Félix Fiala (Neuchâtel)
- 1954–55 Johann Jakob Burckhardt
- 1956–57 Eduard Stiefel (ETH Zurich)
- 1958–59 Georges Vincent (University of Lausanne)
- 1960–61 Heinrich Jecklin (University of Zurich)
- 1962–63 Beno Eckmann (ETH Zurich)
- 1964–65 Jean de Siebenthal (EPF Lausanne)
- 1966–67 Heinz Huber (Basel)
- 1968–69 Walter Nef (Bern)
- 1970–71 Roger Bader (Neuchâtel)
- 1972–73 Ernst Specker (ETH Zurich)
- 1974–75 André Haefliger (Geneva)
- 1976–77 Heinrich Kleisli (Fribourg)
- 1978–79 André Delessert (University of Lausanne)
- 1980–81 Pierre Gabriel
- 1982–83 Alain Robert (Neuchâtel)
- 1984–85 Henri Carnal (Bern)
- 1986–87 Shristi D. Chatterji (EPF Lausanne)
- 1988–89 Norbert A’Campo (Basel)
- 1990–91 Urs Stammbach (ETH Zurich)
- 1992–93 Harald Holmann (Fribourg)
- 1994–95 François Sigrist (Neuchâtel)
- 1996–97 Hans Jarchow (University of Zurich)
- 1998–99 Gerhard Wanner (Geneva)
- 2000–01 Urs Würgler (Bern)
- 2002–03 Rolf Jeltsch (ETH Zurich)
- 2004–05 Peter Buser (EPF Lausanne)
- 2006–07 Norbert Hungerbühler (Fribourg)
- 2008–09 Viktor Schroeder (University of Zurich)
- 2010–11 Bruno Colbois (Neuchâtel)
- 2012–13 Christine Riedtmann (University of Bern)
- 2014–15 Nicolas Monod (EPF Lausanne)
- 2016–17 Anand Dessai (University of Fribourg)
- 2018–19 Urs Lang (ETH Zurich)
- 2020–21 Jeremy Blanc (Basel)
- 2022–23 Alain Valette (University of Neuchâtel)
- 2024–25 Joachim Rosenthal (University of Zurich)
- 2026–27 Christiane Tretter (University of Bern)
