= Albert Pfluger =

Swiss mathematician

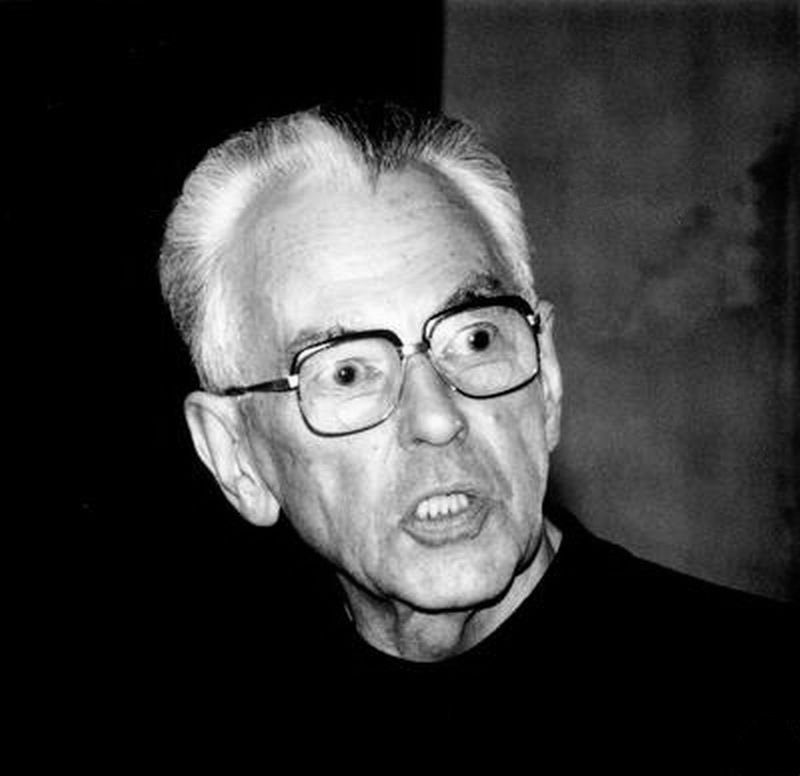
Albert Pfluger 1988

Albert Pfluger (13 October 1907, Oensingen – 14 September 1993, Zürich) was a Swiss mathematician, specializing in complex function theory.

== Biography ==
Pfluger, the son of a farmer, attended secondary school in Stans. He then studied mathematics at ETH Zürich, where in 1935 he received his promotion (Ph.D) under George Pólya with a thesis Über eine Interpretation gewisser Konvergenz- und Fortsetzungseigenschaften Dirichlet'scher Reihen. Afterwards, he became a Gymnasium teacher at the canton school in Zug and the canton school in Solothurn. He received his habilitation qualification in 1938 and in 1939 became a professor extraordinarius for applied mathematics and mathematical physics at the University of Fribourg. At ETH Zürich he became a professor extraordinarius in 1940 and in 1943 a professor ordinarius in the professorial chair vacated by George Pólya in 1940. Pfluger retired from ETH Zürich in 1978 as professor emeritus.

He did research on the value distribution theory of Rolf Nevanlinna, potential theory, conformal maps and quasiconformal mapping, as well as Riemann surfaces. In 1957 Pfluger's monograph Theorie der Riemannschen Flächen was published in Springer's series Grundlehren der mathematischen Wissenschaften. With Joseph Hersch, he introduced in 1952 a function (now called the Hersch-Pfluger distortion function) useful in estimating the distortion of quasiconformal mappings. Entire functions with certain regularity properties were introduced and extensively studied by Pfluger and Boris Levin; these functions are now referred to as functions of completely regular growth in the sense of Levin and Pfluger.

Pfluger served a two-year term as president of the Swiss Mathematical Society in 1950–1951. In 1973 he was elected a foreign member of the Finnish Academy of Sciences.

His doctoral students include Peter Henrici and Heinz Rutishauser.

Pfluger was married since 1938 to Maria Jeger.

== Selected publications ==
- with G. Pólya: "On the power series of an integral function having an exceptional value." In Mathematical Proceedings of the Cambridge Philosophical Society, vol. 31, no. 2, pp. 153–155. Cambridge University Press, 1935. doi:10.1017/S0305004100013244
- "On analytic functions bounded at the lattice points." Proceedings of the London Mathematical Society 2, no. 1 (1937): 305–315. doi:10.1112/plms/s2-42.1.305
- "Die Wertverteilung und das Verhalten von Betrag und Argument einer speziellen Klasse analytischer Funktionen." Commentarii Mathematici Helvetici 11 (1938): 180–214.
- "Zur Defektrelation ganzer Funktionen endlicher Ordnung." Commentarii Mathematici Helvetici 19, no. 1 (1946): 91–104. doi:10.1007/BF02565950
- "Quasikonforme Abbildungen und logarithmische Kapazität." Ann. Inst. Fourier 2 (1950): 69–80. doi:10.5802/aif.20
- "Zur Stabilität des tangential gedrückten Stabes." ZAMM-Journal of Applied Mathematics and Mechanics/Zeitschrift für Angewandte Mathematik und Mechanik 35, no. 5 (1955): 191. doi:10.1002/zamm.19550350506
- "Extremallängen und Kapazität." Commentarii Mathematici Helvetici 29, no. 1 (1955): 120–131. doi:10.1007/BF02564275
- "Über die Äquivalenz der geometrischen und der analytischen Definition quasikonformer Abbildungen." Commentarii Mathematici Helvetici 33, no. 1 (1959): 23–33. doi:10.1007/BF02565903

== Sources ==
- Hans Künzi, Zum Gedenken an Albert Pfluger, 1907-1993. Elemente der Mathematik, Band 49, Heft 3, S. 89–91, 1994.
- Joseph Hersch (ed.): Complex analysis: articles dedicated to Albert Pfluger on the occasion of his 80. birthday. Birkhäuser 1988
