= Universal Taylor series =

A universal Taylor series is a formal power series $\sum_{n=1}^\infty a_n x^n$, such that for every continuous function $h$ on $[-1,1]$, if $h(0)=0$, then there exists an increasing sequence $\left(\lambda_n\right)$ of positive integers such that
$$\lim_{n\to\infty}\left\|\sum_{k=1}^{\lambda_n} a_k x^k-h(x)\right\| = 0$$
In other words, the set of partial sums of $\sum_{n=1}^\infty a_n x^n$ is dense (in sup-norm) in $C[-1,1]_0$, the set of continuous functions on $[-1,1]$ that is zero at origin.

== Statements and proofs ==
Fekete proved that a universal Taylor series exists.

Proof

Let $f_1, f_2, ...$ be the sequence in which each rational-coefficient polynomials with zero constant coefficient appears countably infinitely many times (use the diagonal enumeration). By Weierstrass approximation theorem, it is dense in $C[-1,1]_0$. Thus it suffices to approximate the sequence. We construct the power series iteratively as a sequence of polynomials $p_1, p_2, ...$, such that $p_n, p_{n+1}$ agrees on the first $n$ coefficients, and $\|f_n - p_n \|_\infty \leq 1/n$.

To start, let $p_1 = f_1$. To construct $p_{n+1}$, replace each $x$ in $f_{n+1} - p_n$ by a close enough approximation with lowest degree $\geq n+1$, using the lemma below. Now add this to $p_n$.

Lemma—The function $f(x) = x$ can be approximated to arbitrary precision with a polynomial with arbitrarily lowest degree. That is, $\forall \epsilon > 0, n \in \{1, 2, ...\}\exists$ polynomial $p(x) = a_nx^n + \cdots + a_N x^N,$ such that $\|f-p\|_\infty \leq \epsilon$.

Proof of lemma

The function $g(x) = x - c\tanh (x/c)$ is the uniform limit of its Taylor expansion, which starts with degree 3. Also, $\|f-g\|_\infty < c$. Thus to $\epsilon$-approximate $f(x) =x$ using a polynomial with lowest degree 3, we do so for $g(x)$ with $c < \epsilon/2$ by truncating its Taylor expansion. Now iterate this construction by plugging in the lowest-degree-3 approximation into the Taylor expansion of $g(x)$, obtaining an approximation of lowest degree 9, 27, 81...
