= Louis Kollros =

Swiss mathematician (1878–1959)

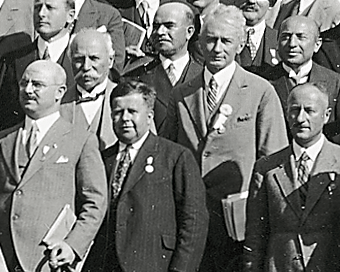
Louis Kollros (3rd from right) at the International Congress of Mathematicians 1932 in Zürich

Louis Kollros (7 May 1878 – 19 June 1959) was a Swiss mathematician. From 1909 to 1948 he was a professor ordinarius of geometry at ETH Zurich.

== Biography ==
Kollros was born on 7 May 1878 in La Chaux-de-Fonds. Kollros, the son of a baker, was from 1896 as a student of mathematics and physics at the Zurich Polytechnikum, where he was a fellow student of Albert Einstein and Marcel Grossmann. After graduating in 1900, Kollros taught mathematics from 1900 to 1909 in secondary school in his hometown of La Chaux-de-Fonds. In 1903–1904 to 1909 he studied in Göttingen with Hermann Minkowski and David Hilbert. From 1904 to 1909 Kollross was a privat-docent (lecturer) at the University of Neuchâtel. He received his doctorate in 1905 from the University of Zurich with thesis advisor Hermann Minkowski and thesis Un algorithme pour l'approximation simultaneé de deux grandeurs. At ETH Zurich, where Marcel Grossmann taught until 1927 in the same field, Kollross held from 1909 to 1948 the francophone chair of géométrie descriptive et de géométrie euclidienne.

In 1940–1941 he was president of the Swiss Mathematical Society and from 1958 an honorary member of the Society. He was president of the Steiner-Schläfli committee (tasked with the publication of their works). In this role, he was co-editor of Schläfli's collected works (3 vols.,1950–1956).

He wrote biographies of Évariste Galois (1949, 24 p.) and Jakob Steiner (1947, 24 p.), which appeared in the supplements to the Elemente der Mathematik (Birkhäuser Verlag).

His doctoral students include Ferdinand Gonseth.

He died on 19 June 1959 in Zürich.

== Selected publications ==
- Un algorithme pour l'approximation simultaneé de deux grandeurs, Imprimerie Soullier, Geneva 1905
- Géométrie descriptive, Orell Füssli, Zürich 1918
- Cours de géométrie projective, Griffon, Neuchâtel 1946, 108 p.
