= Louis Crelier =

Swiss mathematician

Louis Jacques Crelier (3 November 1873, Bure, Switzerland – 28 November 1935) was a Swiss mathematician.

In 1886 he enrolled at l'Ecole normale in Porrentruy and then studied at the University of Berne, where he received his doctorate in 1895. He began his teaching career at the secondary school in Saint-Imier and then taught at the technical school (founded in 1873) in Biel/Bienne. He became in 1912 professor extraordinarius and in 1918 professor ordinarius at the University of Berne.

Crelier served a two-year term from 1920 to 1921 as president of the Swiss Mathematical Society. He was an Invited Speaker of the ICM in 1924 at Toronto and in 1928 at Bologna.

== Selected publications ==
- Sur quelques propriétés des fonctions Besséliennes tirées de la théories des fractions continues. Milan: Imp. Bernardoni de C. Rebeschini et c.e. 1896.
- Systèmes cinématiques. Paris: Gauthier-Villars. 1911.
- "Puissance d'une droite par rapport à un cercle". Nouvelles annales de mathématiques. 17: 339–345. 1917.
- "Faisceaux de cercles relatifs à la puissance d'une droite". Nouvelles annales de mathématiques. 17: 290–297. 1917.
