= Rolin Wavre =

Swiss mathematician

Rolin-Louis Wavre (25 March 1896 in Neuchâtel – 9 December 1949 in Geneva) was a Swiss mathematician.

Wavre studied at the Sorbonne and received his Ph.D. in 1921 from the University of Geneva, where he became a professor extraordinarius in 1922, and a professor ordinarius in 1934 (as successor to Charles Cailler). Wavre did research on, among other subjects, logic and the philosophy of mathematics, in which he was an adherent of Brouwer's intuitionism. Independently of, and almost simultaneously with, Leon Lichtenstein, he dealt with equilibrium figures of a heterogeneous fluid mass, with a view to applications to planetary systems in astrophysics.

In 1932, in Zürich, he was a plenary speaker at the ICM with talk L'aspect analytique du problème des figures planétaires. He was an invited speaker at the ICM in 1920 in Strasbourg, in 1928 in Bologna, and in 1936 in Oslo. For the two years 1936 and 1937, he was the president of the Swiss Mathematical Society.

As an adolescent, Wavre attended Neuchâtel's gymnasium and was a close friend of Jean Piaget (who became a famous psychologist) and Gustave Juvet (who became a prominent mathematician).

== Selected publications ==
- La logique amusante. Geneva: Editions du Mont-Blanc. 1946; 80 pages
- Wavre, Rolin (1934). "Is there a crisis in mathematics?". American Mathematical Monthly. 41 (8): 488–499. doi:10.2307/2300414. JSTOR 2300414.
- L'imagination du réel, l'invention et la découverte dans la science des nombres. Neuchâtel: Baconnière. 1948; 132 pages
- Figures planétaires et géodésie. Gauthiers-Villars. 1932; with foreword by Jacques Hadamard; 194 pages
