= Charles Dumas (disambiguation) =

Charles Dumas (1937–2004) was an American high jumper and Olympic gold medalist.

Charles Dumas may also refer to:

- Charles Dumas (newspaperman) (1851–1935), South Australian newspaper proprietor and politician
- Charles W. F. Dumas (1721–1796), German-born intellectual and American diplomat during the American Revolution
- Charles Robert-Dumas (1875–1946), French novelist

== See also ==
- Dumas (surname)
