= Norbert A'Campo =

Swiss mathematician (born 1941)

Norbert A’Campo
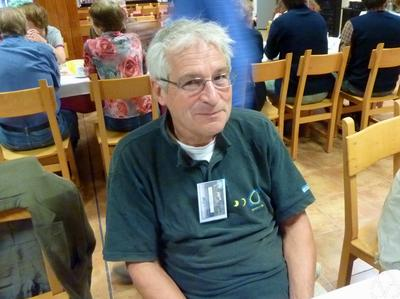
- A’Campo in 2010
- Born: April 27, 1941 (age 85)
- Education: University of Paris-Sud
- Occupation: Mathematician

Norbert A'Campo (born 27 April 1941) is a Swiss mathematician working on singularity theory. He earned a doctorate in 1972 from the University of Paris-Sud. In 1974 he was an invited speaker at the International Congress of Mathematicians, and in 1988 he was elected president of the Swiss Mathematical Society. In 2012 he became a fellow of the American Mathematical Society.
