= Jérôme Franel =

Swiss mathematician (1859–1939)

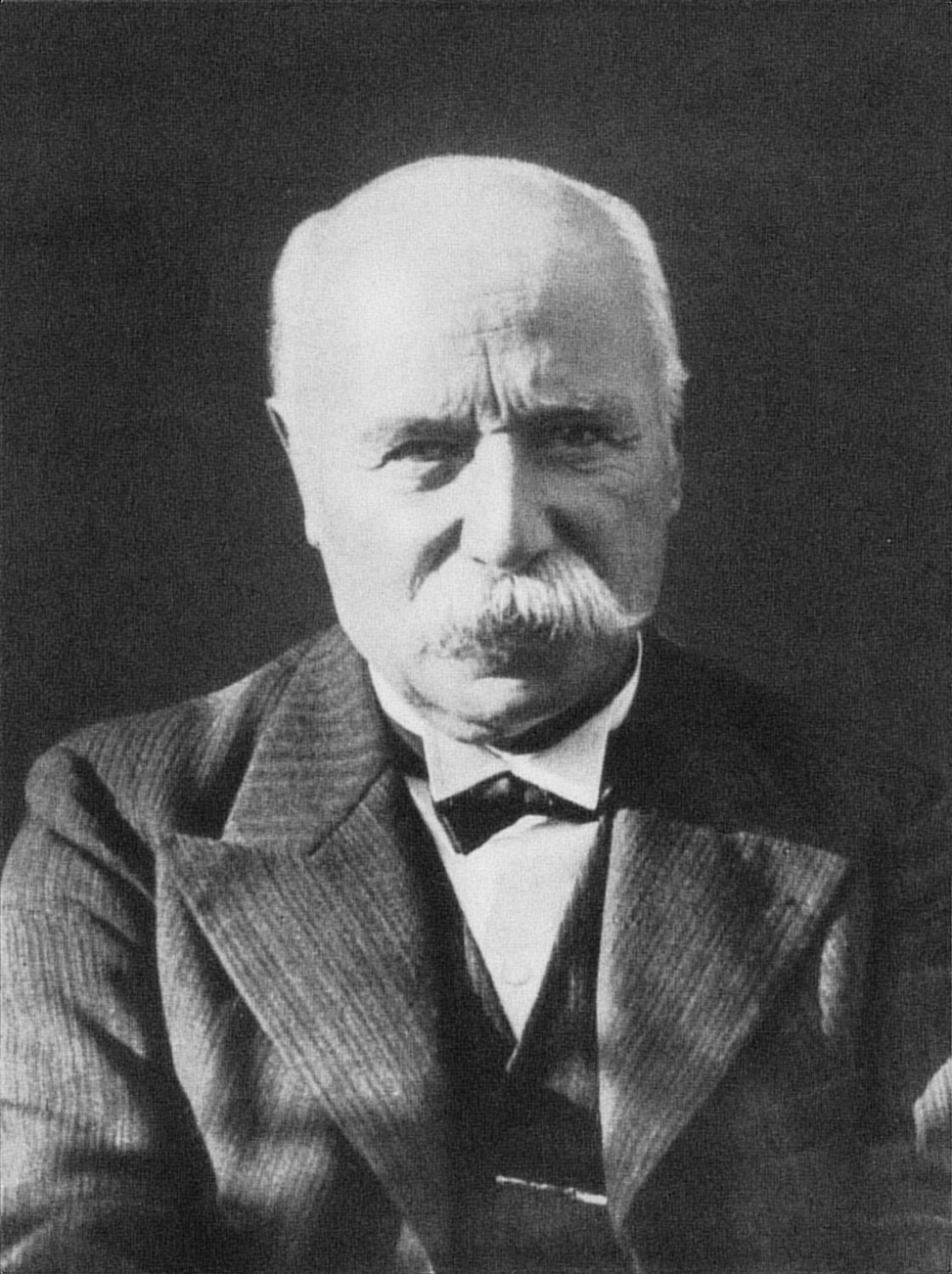
- Born: November 29, 1859; Travers, Switzerland
- Died: November 21, 1939 (aged 79)
- Education: Paris Academy
- Known for: Analytic Number Theory

Jérôme Franel (1859–1939) was a Swiss mathematician who specialised in analytic number theory. He is mainly known through a 1924 paper, in which he establishes the equivalence of the Riemann hypothesis to a statement on the size of the discrepancy in the Farey sequences, and which is directly followed (in the same journal) by a development on the same subject by Edmund Landau.

Jérôme Franel was a citizen ("bourgeois") of Provence (Vaud, Switzerland). He was born on 29 November 1859 in Travers (Neuchâtel, Suisse) and died in Zürich on 21 November 1939.

George Pólya said that he was an especially attractive kind of person and a very good teacher, but that, since he spent most of his time teaching and reading French literature (for which he had a passion), he had no time left for research. After his retirement he worked on the Riemann hypothesis.

== Childhood and schools ==
Jerôme Franel spent his first years with his 12 brothers and sisters in Travers. He graduated with a sciences highschool diploma from the "Ecole industrielle" in Lausanne. He then studied at the Politechnikum in Zürich, and in Berlin where he attended courses given by Weierstrass, Kronecker and Kummer, and finally in Paris where he attended courses by Hermite. On 15 September 1883 he was awarded a science bachelor's degree ("licence") from the Paris Academy.

== Career ==
Franel taught then for two years at the "Ecole industrielle" in Lausanne. On 1 April 1886, then only 26 years old, he was appointed to the Chair of Mathematics in the French language at the Politechnikum in Zürich by the Federal Council of Switzerland.

In 1896 he was a member of the organizing committee of the first International Congress of Mathematicians, which took place in Zürich in 1897. He delivered the introductory lecture to the congress, written by Henri Poincaré, but who was then unwell. In 1905 the University of Zürich awarded him an honorary doctorate, and the city of Zürich awarded him honorary citizenship ("Bourgeoisie"). Under his presidency (1905–1909) the school was entirely restructured, and it was probably through his insistence (in particular, through a 1907 speech) that the Polytechnikum finally obtained (in 1908) the right to award a doctoral degree like the university did. The first doctorates were awarded in 1909. He retired in 1929.

== References and notes ==
- Jérôme Franel's necrology, by Louis Kollros, in: Verhandlungen der Schweizerischen Naturforschenden Gesellschaft 120 (1940), 439–444. Read french document online
