= Alexander Weinstein =

Russian American mathematician

- 1930 in Jena
- Born: 21 January 1897; Saratov, Russia
- Died: 6 November 1979 (aged 82); Washington, D.C., US
- Education: University of Zurich
- Scientific career
- Fields: Mathematics
- Workplaces: University of Maryland, College Park
- Doctoral advisors: Rudolf Fueter; Hermann Weyl
- Doctoral students: Ruth M. Davis

Alexander Weinstein (21 January 1897 – 6 November 1979) was a mathematician who worked on boundary value problems in fluid dynamics.

== Early life, family and personal life ==
Weinstein was born to Judel Lejb Weinstein and Praskovya Levkovich, his family was Jewish, and his father was a doctor. His family moved to Astrakhan, but later decided to emigrate to Germany, there Weinstein completed his schooling, having studied first in Würzburg, then at the University of Göttingen during 1913/14.

After his graduation, he left for Zürich and soon undertook research for Hermann Weyl and Rudolf Fueter and was awarded a doctorate in 1921 for his thesis on the tensor calculus and linear groups of matrices. Weyl suggested Weinstein to several prominent mathematicians, including Paul Sophus Epstein, who was then worked at the California Institute of Technology. In the end, Weinstein worked as an assistant of Leon Lichtenstein at the University of Leipzig in 1922. In 1924, Weinstein returned to Zürich and continued his research into hydrodynamics, he published two works on the matter.

Weinstein was a target of xenophobia, so he struggled to find a "scientific position adequate to his abilities in Switzerland", as such Weyl recommended Weinstein for a Rockfeller Fellowship, with him being awarded it, and spent two years (1926/27) in Rome, where he worked with Tulio Levi-Civita. With Levi-Civita, Weinstein published three more works before he returned to Zürich as a privatdocent in Weyl's chair, then in 1928 he was appointed to the Hamburg Technical University, he also joined the German Mathematical Society. He married Marianne Olga Louise Ganz on 13 March 1928 in Hamburg, they did not have any children.

By 1933, he was sought by Albert Einstein as a collaborator in Berlin, however after the electoral success of the Nazi Party, Weinstein, being of Jewish background, instead went to Sorbonne and the Collège de France in Paris, where he worked with Jacques Hadamard. He was awarded the degree of Docteur ès Sciences Mathématiques in 1937, and spent a few semesters in England, at the University of Cambridge, and the University of London, before returning to Paris. In May 1940, after the Nazi invasion of France, Weinstein and his wife fled to Portugal with the hope they could seek refuge to the United States.

They arrived in New York on 26 October 1940, and lived at 22 West 75th Street, for the next eight years Weinstein taught at a number of different places, and became a citizen in 1946. Together with Monroe Martin, an expert on classical analysis and fluid dynamics, he founded the Institute of Fluid Dynamics and Applied Mathematics (later renamed the Institute of Physical Science and Technology) at Maryland in 1949.

Weinstein's research covered numerous topics, he is famous for having solved Helmholtz's problem for jets, giving the first uniqueness and existence theorem for free jets in his papers from 1923 to 1929, and he examined many boundary problems, whilst giving hydrodynamic and electromagnetic applications. Weinstein's method was later developed to give accurate bounds of eigenvalues of plates and membranes, and he introduced a new branch of potential theory through his examination of singular partial differential equations.

Weinstein retired in 1967, yet continued research at the American University in Washington D.C., he worked from 1968 to 1972 at Georgetown University. In 1972, Weinstein published alongside William Stenger, the book Methods of Intermediate problems for eigenvalues, and then in 1978, when Weinstein was eighty years old, Joe D Diaz made a collection of Weinstein's writings. He died on 6 November 1979, following a surgical operation.

== Publications ==
- with Nathan Aronszajn:
  - Aronszajn, N; Weinstein, A (1941). "Existence, convergence and equivalence in the unified theory of eigenvalues of plates and membranes". Proc Natl Acad Sci U S A. 27 (3): 188–191. Bibcode:1941PNAS...27..188A. doi:10.1073/pnas.27.3.188. PMC 1078302. PMID 16588447.
  - Aronszajn, Nathan; Weinstein, Alexander (1942). "On the unified theory of eigenvalues of plates and membranes". Amer. J. Math. 64 (1): 623–645. doi:10.2307/2371709. JSTOR 2371709. MR 0007196.
- Weinstein, Alexander (1948). "Discontinuous integrals and generalized potential theory". Trans. Amer. Math. Soc. 63 (2): 342–354. doi:10.1090/s0002-9947-1948-0025023-x. MR 0025023.
- Weinstein, Alexander (1953). "Generalized axially symmetric potential theory". Bull. Amer. Math. Soc. 59 (1): 20–38. doi:10.1090/s0002-9904-1953-09651-3. MR 0053289.

A selection of Alexander Weinstein's scientific contributions was edited by J. B. Díaz and published as:

- Díaz, J. B., ed. (1978), Alexander Weinstein selecta (in English, German, and French), London–San Francisco–Melbourne: Pitman, pp. XXI+629, ISBN 0-273-08411-9, MR 0518819, Zbl 0383.01021
