= Georges de Rham =

Swiss mathematician

- Born: 10 September 1903; Roche, Vaud, Switzerland
- Died: 9 October 1990 (aged 87); Lausanne, Switzerland
- Education: University of Paris; University of Lausanne
- Known for: de Rham's theorem de Rham cohomology de Rham curve de Rham invariant Current; Holonomy
- Awards: Marcel Benoist Prize (1965)
- Scientific career
- Fields: Mathematics
- Workplaces: University of Lausanne; University of Geneva
- Doctoral advisor: Henri Lebesgue

Georges de Rham (French: [dəʁam]; 10 September 1903 – 9 October 1990) was a Swiss mathematician, known for his contributions to differential topology.

== Biography ==
Georges de Rham was born on 10 September 1903 in Roche, a small village in the canton of Vaud in Switzerland. He was the fifth born of the six children in the family of Léon de Rham, a constructions engineer. Georges de Rham grew up in Roche but went to school in nearby Aigle, the main town of the district, travelling daily by train. By his own account, he was not an extraordinary student in school, where he mainly enjoyed painting and dreamed of becoming a painter. In 1919 he moved with his family to Lausanne in a rented apartment in Beaulieu Castle, where he would live for the rest of his life. Georges de Rham started the Gymnasium in Lausanne with a focus on humanities, following his passion for literature and philosophy but learning little mathematics. On graduating from the Gymnasium in 1921 however, he decided not to continue with the Faculty of Letters in order to avoid Latin. He opted instead for the Faculty of Sciences of the University of Lausanne. At the faculty he started out studying biology, physics and chemistry and no mathematics initially. While trying to learn some mathematics by himself as a tool for physics, his interest was raised and by the third year he abandoned biology to focus decisively on mathematics.

At the University he was mainly influenced by two professors, Gustave Dumas and Dmitry Mirimanoff, who guided him in studying the works of Émile Borel, René-Louis Baire, Henri Lebesgue, and Joseph Serret. After graduating in 1925, de Rham remained at the University of Lausanne as an assistant to Dumas. Starting work towards completing his doctorate, he read the works of Henri Poincaré on topology on the advice of Dumas. Although he found inspiration for a thesis subject in Poincaré, progress was slow as topology was a relatively new topic and access to the relevant literature was difficult in Lausanne. With the recommendation of Dumas, de Rham contacted Lebesgue and went to Paris for a few months in 1926 and, again, for a few months in 1928. Both trips were financed by his own savings and he spent his time in Paris taking classes and studying at the University of Paris and the Collège de France. Lebesgue provided de Rham with a lot of help in this period, both with his studies and supporting his first research publications. When he finished his thesis Lebesgue advised him to send it to Élie Cartan and, in 1931, de Rham received his doctorate from the University of Paris before a commission led by Cartan and including Paul Montel and Gaston Julia as examiners.

In 1932 de Rham returned to the University of Lausanne as an extraordinary professor. In 1936 he also became a professor at the University of Geneva and continued to hold both positions in parallel until his retirement in 1971.

De Rham was also one of the best mountaineers in Switzerland. As a member of the Independent High Mountain Group of Lausanne since 1944, he opened several difficult routes, some of them in the Valais Alps (such as the south ridge of the Stockhorn from Baltschieder) and Vaud Alps (such as L'Argentine and Pacheu). In 1944 he wrote a complete climbing guidebook of the Miroir d'Argentine, where he climbed routes until 1980. According to John Milnor, in 1933 de Rham encountered on one of his hikes James Alexander and Hassler Whitney, who were climbing together near the Weisshorn in Valais; this meeting was the beginning of a more than 40-year friendship between Whitney and de Rham.

== Mathematics research ==
The theory of differential forms has classical roots, with the relation between forms and differential topology initiated in the early 20th century by Henri Poincaré and Élie Cartan, who observed the Poincaré lemma as well as the fact that not every closed differential form is exact. Cartan conjectured in 1928 that the Betti numbers of a smooth manifold could be encoded by differential forms. As a particular form of this, he conjectured that a closed form is exact if it integrates to zero over any submanifold without boundary, and that a submanifold without boundary is itself a boundary of another submanifold, if every closed form integrates to zero over it. De Rham, in his 1931 thesis, proved Cartan's conjecture by decomposing an arbitrary differential form into the sum of a closed form and some number of elementary forms, which are differential forms associated to a smooth triangulation of the space.

Following this work, de Rham made several attempts to unify forms and submanifolds into a single kind of mathematical object. He identified the ultimate notion of a current in the 1950s, generalizing (and inspired by) Laurent Schwartz's recent work on distributions. De Rham's work on these topics is now usually formulated in the language of cohomology theory, although he did not do so himself. In this form, his thesis work has become foundational to the field of differential topology, while his theory of currents is basic to geometric measure theory and related fields. His work is particularly important for Hodge theory and sheaf theory.

In an additional part of his 1931 thesis, de Rham introduced higher-dimensional versions of the three-dimensional lens spaces and computed their homology, thereby establishing a necessary condition in order for two lens spaces to be homeomorphic.

The structure of a Riemannian product automatically implies a product structure of the holonomy groups. In 1952 De Rham considered the converse, proving that, if there is a decomposition of the tangent bundle into vector subbundles which are invariant under the holonomy group, then the Riemannian structure must decompose as a product. This result, now known as the de Rham decomposition theorem, has become a fundamental textbook result in Riemannian geometry.

== Major publications ==
- de Rham, Georges (1931). Sur l'analysis situs des variétés à n dimensions. Thèses de l'entre-deux-guerres. Vol. 129. JFM 57.1520.06. MR 3532989.
- de Rham, Georges (1952). "Sur la reductibilité d'un espace de Riemann". Commentarii Mathematici Helvetici. 26: 328–344. doi:10.1007/BF02564308. MR 0052177. S2CID 121784433. Zbl 0048.15701.
- de Rham, Georges (1984). Differentiable manifolds. Forms, currents, harmonic forms. Grundlehren der mathematischen Wissenschaften. Vol. 266. Translated by Smith, F. R. With an introduction by S. S. Chern. (Translation of 1955 French original ed.). Berlin: Springer-Verlag. doi:10.1007/978-3-642-61752-2. ISBN 3-540-13463-8. MR 0760450. Zbl 0534.58003.

== See also ==
- Laplace–Beltrami operator
- Hodge–de Rham spectral sequence
