= Lewis Fueter =

American silversmith (1746–1784)

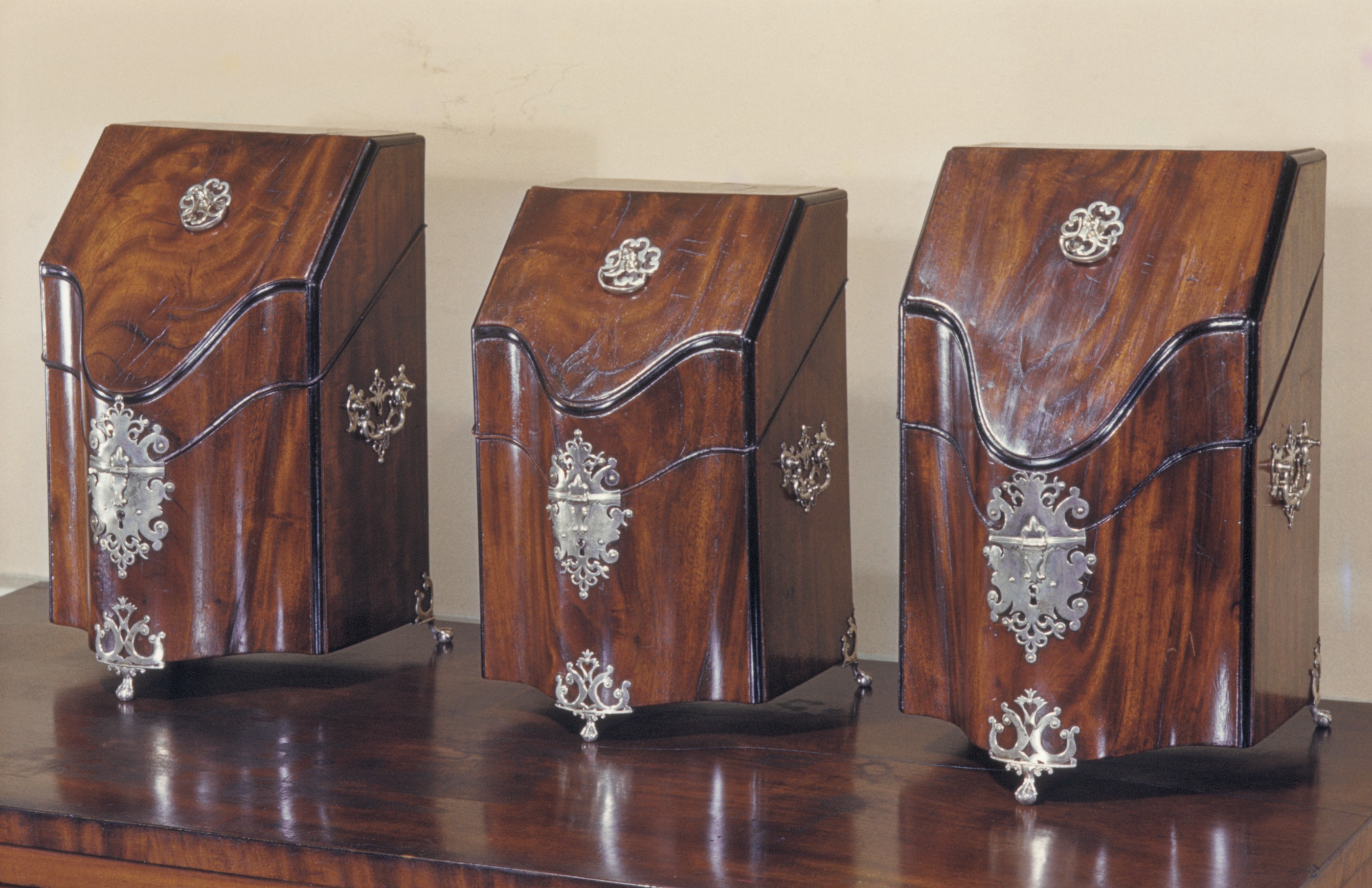
Knife boxes, Lewis Fueter, 1765–95

Lewis Fueter (1746–1784), born Ludwig Anton Fueter, was an American silversmith, active in New York City.

Feuter's father was silversmith Daniel Christian Fueter, and he was born in Bern, Switzerland, before the family emigrated. They arrived in New York City circa 1754, where his father established a shop. It seems likely that he worked in his father's shop for some interval, then entered into partnership with his father as evidenced by the following advertisement:

Daniel & Lewis Fueter. — This serves to inform the Public, and our former kind Customers, that we the Subscribers, are return'd to this City, in the House we remov'd out, in Dock-Street, next to Mr. G. Dyckinck's, and purpose to carry on the Business of Gold, Silver-smith's and Jewelry Work, in all its Branches, as also gilding, assaying oar, refining, &c. at the most reasonable rates; and we return Thanks to our former Customers, and assure them and the Public that will be pleased to employ us, that they shall be serv'd with punctuality, and Honour, by their Very oblig'd and humble Servants, Daniel and Lewis Feuter.

— The New York Gazette and the Weekly Mercury, January 30, 1769

When his father returned to Switzerland in 1769, along with the younger son, Christian Fueter, Lewis remained in New York with his brother Daniel Fueter, Jr. He established his own shop, as indicated by the following advertisement:

Lewis Fueter, son of Mr. Daniel Fueter, late of Bayard-Street; Begs leave to inform the publick, that he is removed to the small house next door to Mr. Isaac Heron's Watch-maker, at the Coffee-House Bridge, where he makes and mends all kinds of work in the jewellers and goldsmith's business, as neat and cheap as can be done (he flatters himself) by any man in this City. He likewise tries ores of any kind, assaying, refining and guilding in all its branches, perform'd with the utmost accuracy and dispatch. He thinks himself obliged, in the name of his father, as well as for himself, to return thanks to the respectable publick for the many favours done, and to assure those who shall honour him with their commands, that he will make it his utmost endeavour to deserve their countenance and encouragement.

— The New-York Gazette and the Weekly Mercury, May 21, 1770

Fueter was made freeman on March 28, 1775. A few months later, on August 12, 1775, he was attacked by a mob of American revolutionaries for his Loyalist inclinations. As recorded in a letter written from Staten Island by an unknown Tory: "The persecution of the loyalists continues unremitted. Donald McLean, Theophilus Hardenbrook, young Fueter, the silversmith, and Rem Rapelje of Brooklyn, have been cruelly rode on rails, a practice most painful, dangerous and, till now, peculiar to the humane population of New England." By about 1778, Feuter was commissioned to make sword belt plates for the Royal Provincial Corps. When the British evacuated New York in 1783, Fueter accompanied them to Halifax. Shortly thereafter he went to Jamaica, where he drowned in 1784.

Fueter's work is collected in the Metropolitan Museum of Art, Clark Art Institute, and Winterthur Museum.
