= Pairing function =

Function uniquely mapping two numbers into a single number

In mathematics, a pairing function is a process to uniquely encode two natural numbers into a single natural number.

Any pairing function can be used in set theory to prove that integers and rational numbers have the same cardinality as natural numbers.

== Definition ==
A pairing function is a bijection

$\pi:\mathbb{N} \times \mathbb{N} \to \mathbb{N}.$

=== Generalization ===
More generally, a pairing function on a set $A$ is a function that maps each pair of elements from $A$ into an element of $A$, such that distinct pairs of elements of $A$ are associated with distinct elements of $A$, (Note: That is, an injection from $A^2 \rightarrow A$.) or a bijection from $A^2$ to $A$.

Instead of abstracting from the domain, the arity of the pairing function can also be generalized: there exists an n-ary generalized Cantor pairing function on $\mathbb{N}$.

== Cantor pairing function ==
The Cantor pairing function assigns one natural number to each pair of natural numbers

Graph of the Cantor pairing function

The Cantor pairing function is a primitive recursive pairing function

$$\pi:\mathbb{N} \times \mathbb{N} \to \mathbb{N}$$

defined by

$$\pi(k_1,k_2) := \frac{1}{2}(k_1 + k_2)(k_1 + k_2 + 1)+k_2=\binom{k_1+k_2+1}{2}+k_2$$

where $k_1, k_2\in\{0, 1, 2, 3, \dots\}$.

It can also be expressed as $\pi(x, y) := \frac{x^2 + x + 2xy + 3y + y^2}{2}$.

It is also strictly monotonic with respect to each argument, that is, for all $k_1, k_1', k_2, k_2' \in \mathbb{N}$, if $k_1 < k_{1}'$, then $\pi(k_1, k_2) < \pi(k_1', k_2)$; similarly, if $k_2 < k_{2}'$, then $\pi(k_1, k_2) < \pi(k_1, k_2')$.

The statement that this is the only quadratic pairing function is known as the Fueter–Pólya theorem. Whether this is the only polynomial pairing function is still an open question. When we apply the pairing function to k_{1} and k_{2} we often denote the resulting number as ⟨k_{1}, k_{2}⟩.

This definition can be inductively generalized to the Cantor tuple function

$$\pi^{(n)}:\mathbb{N}^n \to \mathbb{N}$$

for $n > 2$ as

$$\pi^{(n)}(k_1, \ldots, k_{n-1}, k_n) := \pi ( \pi^{(n-1)}(k_1, \ldots, k_{n-1}) , k_n)$$

with the base case defined above for a pair: $\pi^{(2)}(k_1,k_2) := \pi(k_1,k_2).$

Another generalization of the Cantor pairing function to a bijection $\pi^{(n)}\colon\mathbb{N}^n \to \mathbb{N}$ is provided by the combinatorial number system:

$$\pi^{(n)}(x_1,\dots,x_n)=\binom{x_1+\dots+x_n+n-1}{n}+\binom{x_1+\dots+x_{n-1}+n-2}{n-1}+\dots+\binom{x_1+x_2+1}{2}+\binom{x_1}1.$$

=== Inverting the Cantor pairing function ===
Let $z \in \mathbb{N}$ be an arbitrary natural number. We will show that there exist unique values $x, y \in \mathbb{N}$ such that

$$z = \pi(x, y) = \frac{(x + y + 1)(x + y)}{2} + y$$

and hence that the function π(x, y) is invertible. It is helpful to define some intermediate values in the calculation:

$$w = x + y \!$$
$$t = \frac{1}{2}w(w + 1) = \frac{w^2 + w}{2}$$
$$z = t + y \!$$

where t is the triangle number of w. If we solve the quadratic equation

$$w^2 + w - 2t = 0 \!$$

for w as a function of t, we get

$$w = \frac{\sqrt{8t + 1} - 1}{2}$$

which is a strictly increasing and continuous function when t is non-negative real. Since

$$t \leq z = t + y < t + (w + 1) =  \frac{(w + 1)^2 + (w + 1)}{2}$$

we get that

$$w \leq \frac{\sqrt{8z + 1} - 1}{2} < w + 1$$

and thus

$$w = \left\lfloor \frac{\sqrt{8z + 1} - 1}{2} \right\rfloor.$$

where ⌊ ⌋ is the floor function. So to calculate x and y from z, we do:

$$w = \left\lfloor \frac{\sqrt{8z + 1} - 1}{2} \right\rfloor$$
$$t = \frac{w^2 + w}{2}$$
$$y = z - t \!$$
$$x = w - y. \!$$

Since the Cantor pairing function is invertible, it must be one-to-one and onto.

=== Examples ===
To calculate π(47, 32):

47 + 32 = 79,
79 + 1 = 80,
79 × 80 = 6320,
6320 ÷ 2 = 3160,
3160 + 32 = 3192,

so π(47, 32) = 3192.

To find x and y such that π(x, y) = 1432:

8 × 1432 = 11456,
11456 + 1 = 11457,
√11457 = 107.037,
107.037 − 1 = 106.037,
106.037 ÷ 2 = 53.019,
⌊53.019⌋ = 53,

so w = 53;

53 + 1 = 54,
53 × 54 = 2862,
2862 ÷ 2 = 1431,

so t = 1431;

1432 − 1431 = 1,

so y = 1;

53 − 1 = 52,

so x = 52; thus π(52, 1) = 1432.

=== Derivation ===
A diagonally incrementing "snaking" function, from same principles as Cantor's pairing function, is often used to demonstrate the countability of the rational numbers.

The graphical shape of Cantor's pairing function, a diagonal progression, is a standard trick in working with infinite sequences and countability. (Note: The term "diagonal argument" is sometimes used to refer to this type of enumeration, but it is not directly related to Cantor's diagonal argument.) The algebraic rules of this diagonal-shaped function can verify its validity for a range of polynomials, of which a quadratic will turn out to be the simplest, using the method of induction. Indeed, this same technique can also be followed to try and derive any number of other functions for any variety of schemes for enumerating the plane.

A pairing function can usually be defined inductively – that is, given the nth pair, what is the (n+1)th pair? The way Cantor's function progresses diagonally across the plane can be expressed as

$$\pi(x,y)+1 = \pi(x-1,y+1)$$.

The function must also define what to do when it hits the boundaries of the 1st quadrant – Cantor's pairing function resets back to the x-axis to resume its diagonal progression one step further out, or algebraically:

$$\pi(0,k)+1 = \pi(k+1,0)$$.

Also we need to define the starting point, what will be the initial step in our induction method: π(0, 0) = 0.

Assume that there is a quadratic 2-dimensional polynomial that can fit these conditions (if there were not, one could just repeat by trying a higher-degree polynomial). The general form is then

$$\pi(x,y) = ax^2+by^2+cxy+dx+ey+f$$.

Plug in our initial and boundary conditions to get f = 0 and:

$$bk^2+ek+1 = a(k+1)^2+d(k+1)$$,

so we can match our k terms to get

b = a
d = 1-a
e = 1+a.

So every parameter can be written in terms of a except for c, and we have a final equation, our diagonal step, that will relate them:

$$\begin{align}
\pi(x,y)+1 &= a(x^2+y^2) + cxy + (1-a)x + (1+a)y + 1 \\
&= a((x-1)^2+(y+1)^2) + c(x-1)(y+1) + (1-a)(x-1) + (1+a)(y+1).
\end{align}$$

Expand and match terms again to get fixed values for a and c, and thus all parameters:

a = 1/2 = b = d
c = 1
e = 3/2
f = 0.

Therefore

$$\begin{align}
\pi(x,y) &= \frac{1}{2}(x^2+y^2) + xy + \frac{1}{2}x + \frac{3}{2}y \\
&= \frac{1}{2}(x+y)(x+y+1) + y,
\end{align}$$

is the Cantor pairing function, and we also demonstrated through the derivation that this satisfies all the conditions of induction.

== Shifted Cantor pairing function ==
The following pairing function: $\langle i, j\rangle := \frac{1}{2}(i+j-2)(i+j-1) + i$, where $i, j\in\{1, 2, 3, \dots \}$. is the same as the Cantor pairing function, but shifted to exclude 0 (i.e., $i=k_2+1$, $j=k_1+1$, and $\langle i, j\rangle - 1 = \pi(k_2,k_1)$). It was used in the popular computer textbook of Hopcroft and Ullman (1979).

== For ordinal numbers ==
There exists a "canonical" pairing function for ordinal numbers which is simultaneously a pairing function for every aleph number (i.e., the initial ordinal of every infinite well-orderable cardinal number). It is induced by the following well-ordering of pairs of ordinal numbers:

$$(\alpha,\beta)\preccurlyeq(\gamma,\delta) \text{ if either } \begin{cases}
(\alpha,\beta) = (\gamma,\delta),\\[4pt]
\max(\alpha,\beta) < \max(\gamma,\delta),\\[4pt]
\max(\alpha,\beta) = \max(\gamma,\delta)\ \text{and}\ \alpha<\gamma,\text{ or}\\[4pt]
\max(\alpha,\beta) = \max(\gamma,\delta)\ \text{and}\ \alpha=\gamma\ \text{and}\ \beta<\delta.
\end{cases}$$

The basic idea is that $\max(\alpha,\beta)$ is used as the primary sort key. Therefore, for every ordinal $\alpha$, all pairs with both entries less than $\alpha$ comes before all other pairs; in other words, the Cartesian product $\alpha \times \alpha$ is mapped to an initial segment of this new ordering, with the order type of the initial segment denoted by $\gamma(\alpha)$.

Since $\gamma(\alpha)$ is a strictly increasing ordinal sequence, $\gamma(\alpha) \ge \alpha$. It is also continuous, since for limit ordinal $\lambda$ we have $\lambda \times \lambda = \bigcup_{\alpha < \lambda} (\alpha \times \alpha)$. Now for all aleph number $\alpha$, $\gamma(\alpha) = \alpha$ can be proved by transfinite induction:

- If $\alpha = \omega$, then $\gamma(\alpha) = \omega$ by continuity since $\gamma(n) = n^2$ is a natural number for every natural number $n$.
- If $\alpha > \omega$ is an initial ordinal, then $\gamma(\alpha) = \alpha$ by continuity since $\vert \gamma(\delta) \vert = \vert \delta \times \delta \vert = \vert \delta \vert^2 = \vert \delta \vert < \vert \alpha \vert$ for all infinite $\delta < \alpha$, where $\vert \delta \vert^2 = \vert \delta \vert$ can be shown by applying the inductive hypothesis to the initial ordinal of $\delta$.

An important implication of this pairing function is that $\kappa^2=\kappa$ for all well-orderable infinite cardinal number $\kappa$. In particular, in ZFC every cardinal number is well-orderable, so $\kappa^2=\kappa$ holds for all infinite cardinal $\kappa$. Conversely, the statement "$\kappa^2=\kappa$ holds for all infinite cardinal $\kappa$" implies the axiom of choice; this result is known as Tarski's theorem about choice.

=== Restriction to natural numbers ===
Restriction of the "canonical" pairing function for ordinal numbers to the set of natural numbers $\mathbb{N} \equiv \omega$ yields a pairing function different from the Cantor pairing function, which was considered "more elegant" by Szudzik. The explicit expression defining this pairing function is:

$$\operatorname{ElegantPair}[x, y] := \begin{cases}
y^2 + x&\text{if}\ x < y,\\
x^2 + x + y&\text{if}\ x \ge y.\\
\end{cases}$$

Which can be unpaired using the expression:

$$\operatorname{ElegantUnpair}[z] := \begin{cases}
\left\{ z - \lfloor\sqrt{z}\rfloor^2, \lfloor\sqrt{z}\rfloor \right\}
& \text{if }z - \lfloor\sqrt{z}\rfloor^2 < \lfloor\sqrt{z}\rfloor,
\\
\left\{ \lfloor\sqrt{z}\rfloor, z - \lfloor\sqrt{z}\rfloor^2 - \lfloor\sqrt{z}\rfloor \right\}
& \text{if }z - \lfloor\sqrt{z}\rfloor^2\geq\lfloor\sqrt{z}\rfloor.
\end{cases}$$

(Qualitatively, it assigns consecutive numbers to pairs along the edges of squares.)

One advantage of this pairing function manifests when using a pair function to represent a binary tree-like structure, where the first $c$ natural numbers represent distinct types of leaves, and $\operatorname{Pair}[x, y] + c$ represents a binary tree with left and right subtrees represented by $x$ and $y$ respectively. This pairing function guarantees that all binary trees are ordered by depth. A concrete example of such a binary tree-like structure is an SK combinator calculus expression.

== Other pairing functions ==
The function $P_2(x, y):= 2^x(2y + 1) - 1$ is a pairing function.

In 1990, Regan proposed the first known pairing function that is computable in linear time and with constant space (as the previously known examples can only be computed in linear time if multiplication can be too, which is doubtful). In fact, both this pairing function and its inverse can be computed with finite-state transducers. In the same paper, the author proposed two more monotone pairing functions that can be computed online in linear time and with logarithmic space; the first can also be computed offline with constant space.

In 2001, Pigeon proposed a pairing function based on bit-interleaving, defined recursively as:

$$\langle i,j\rangle_{P}=\begin{cases}
\bot & \text{if}\ i=j=0;\\
\langle\lfloor i/2\rfloor,\lfloor j/2\rfloor\rangle_{P}:i_0:j_0&\text{otherwise,}
\end{cases}$$

where $i_0$ and $j_0$ are the least significant bits of i and j respectively.

== Citations ==
=== References ===
- Hopcroft, John E.; Ullman, Jeffrey D. (1979). Introduction to Automata Theory, Languages, and Computation (1st ed.). Addison-Wesley. ISBN 0-201-02988-X.
- Jech, Thomas (2006). Set Theory. Springer Monographs in Mathematics (The Third Millennium ed.). Springer-Verlag. doi:10.1007/3-540-44761-X. ISBN 3-540-44085-2.
- Lisi, Meri (2007). "Some Remarks on the Cantor Pairing Function". Le Matematiche. LXII: 55–65.
- Pigeon, Steven. "Pairing Function". MathWorld.
- Regan, Kenneth W. (December 1992). "Minimum-Complexity Pairing Functions". Journal of Computer and System Sciences. 45 (3): 285–295. doi:10.1016/0022-0000(92)90027-G. ISSN 0022-0000.
- Rogers, Hartley (1 January 1967). Theory of Recursive Functions and Effective Computability. MIT Press. ISBN 978-0262680523.
- Stein, Sherman K. (1999). Mathematics: The Man-Made Universe (3rd ed.). Dover. ISBN 9780486404509.
- Szudzik, Matthew (2006). "An Elegant Pairing Function" (PDF). szudzik.com. Archived (PDF) from the original on 25 November 2011.
- Szudzik, Matthew P. (1 June 2017). "The Rosenberg-Strong Pairing Function". arXiv:1706.04129 [cs.DM].
