= Roger Dumas =

Roger Dumas may refer to:

- Roger Dumas (actor), French actor
- Roger Dumas (composer), French composer
- Roger Dumas, photographer for The Archives of the Planet
