= Gustave Dumas =

Swiss mathematician

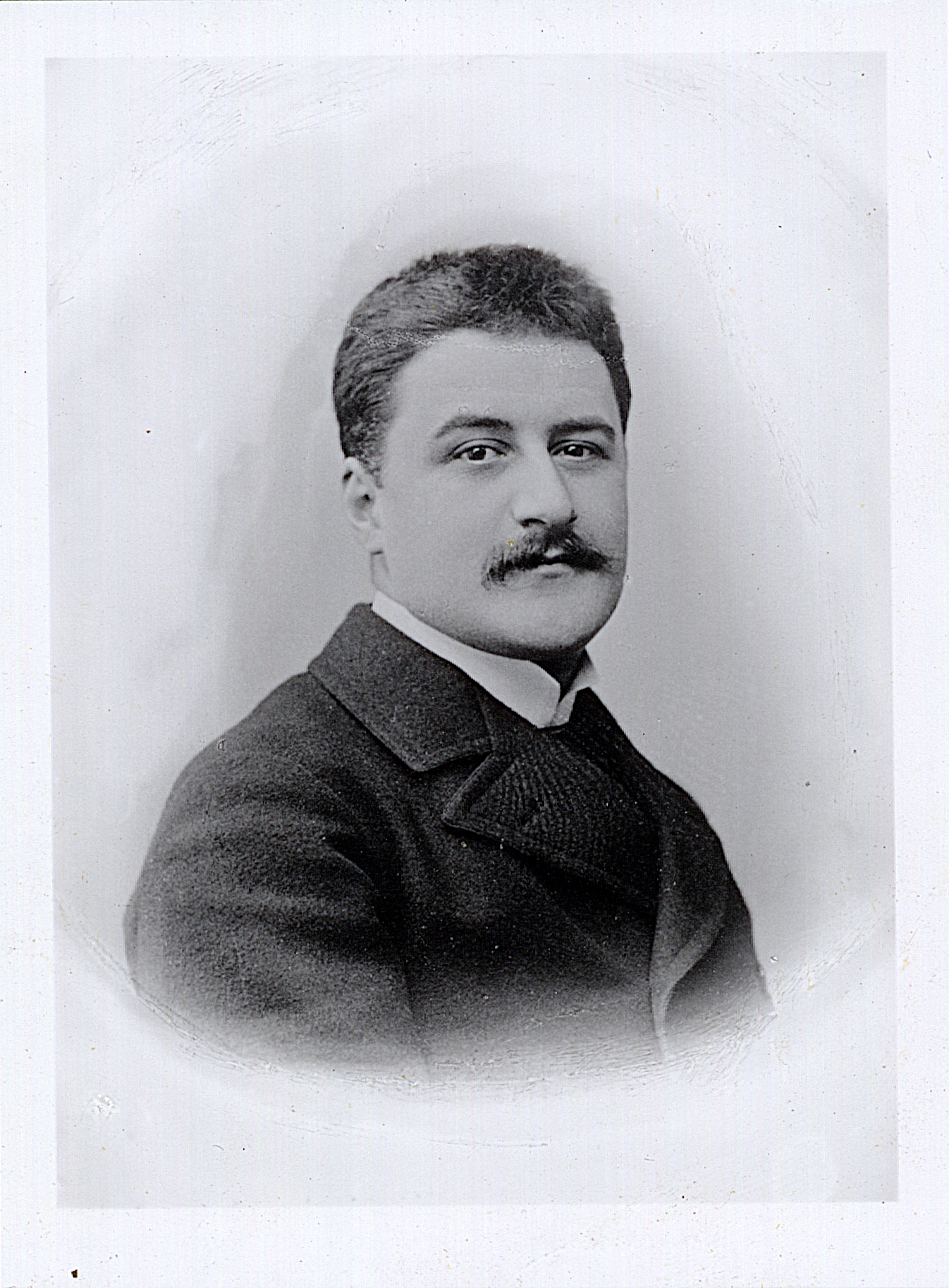

Gustave Dumas (5 March 1872, L'Etivaz, Vaud, Switzerland – 11 July 1955) was a Swiss mathematician, specializing in algebraic geometry.

Dumas received a baccalaureate degree from the University of Lausanne, then another baccalaureate degree from the Sorbonne, and in 1904 a doctoral degree from the Sorbonne with dissertation Sur les fonctions à caractère algébrique dans le voisinage d'un point donné. In 1906 he obtained his habilitation qualification from Zürich's Federal Polytechnic School with habilitation dissertation Sur quelques cas d'irréductibilité des polynômes à coefficients rationnels. From 1906 to 1913 Dumas taught higher mathematics at the Federal Polytechnic School. At the University of Lausanne's Engineering School, he became in 1913 a professor extraordinarius and in 1916 a professor ordinarius, retiring in 1942. At Lausanne he had an important influence on his student Georges de Rham, who became Dumas's assistant before graduating in 1925.

Dumas served a two-year term as president of the Swiss Mathematical Society in 1922–1923. He was an Invited Speaker of the International Congress of Mathematicians in 1928 at Bologna.

== Selected publications ==
- "Sur quelques cas d'irréductibilité des polynômes à coefficients rationnels." Journal de Mathématiques Pures et Appliquées 2 (1906): 191–258.
- "Sur la résolution des singularités des surfaces." CR Acad. Sci. Paris 152 (1911): 682–684.
- "Sur le polygone de Newton et les courbes algébriques planes." Commentarii Mathematici Helvetici 1, no. 1 (1929): 120–141. doi:10.1007/BF01208360
