= Adolphe Dumas =

French poet (1805–1861)

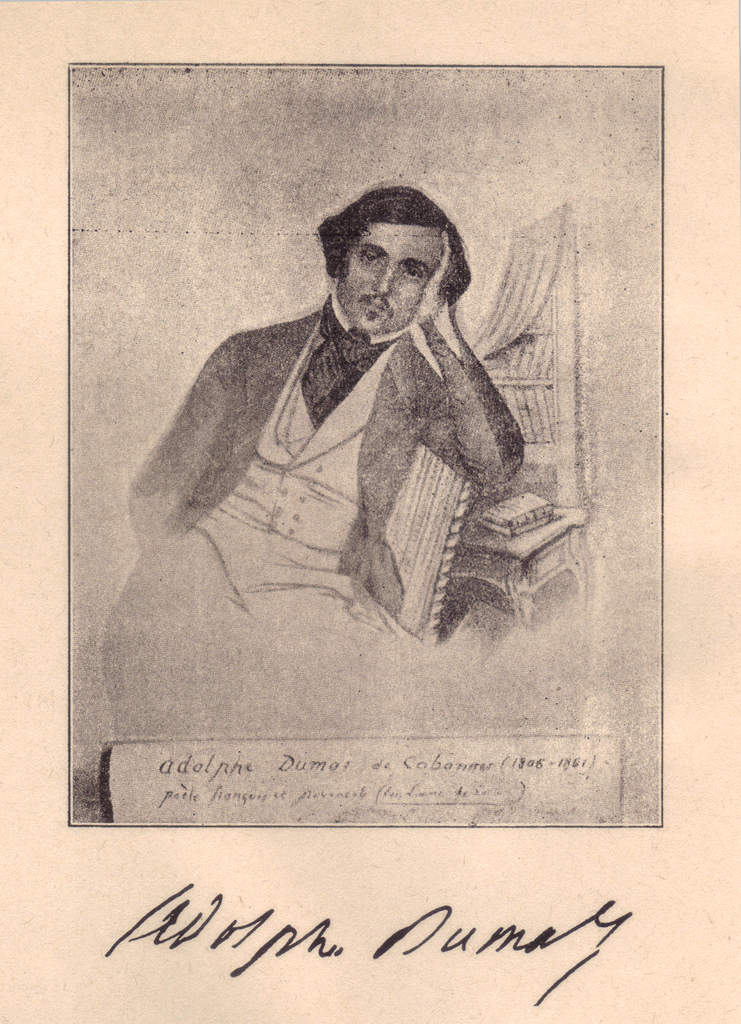

Adolphe Dumas (18 December 1805 Chartreuse de Bon Pas, Vaucluse – 15 August 1861) was a French poet. Among his friends were Béranger, Alfred de Vigny, Victor Hugo, and Lamartine. He wrote Les Parisiennes (1830); La cité des hommes (1835); and Le camp des croisés (1838). Dumas became interested in the Provençal "renaissance", and his poems, Un liame de rasin (1858), were written in the "langue d'oc".
