= Ferdinand Rudio =

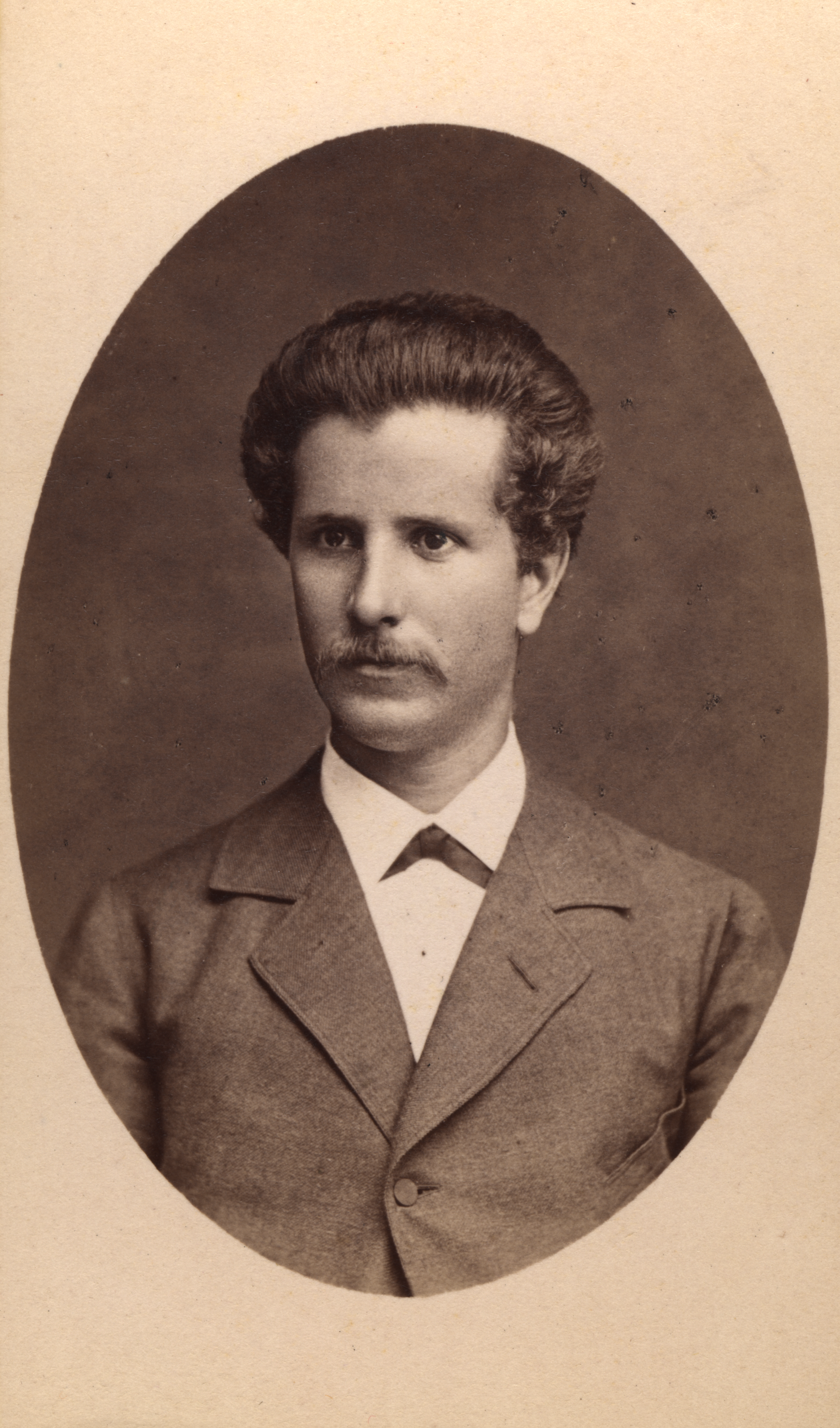
Ferdinand Rudio, 1884

Ferdinand Rudio (born 2 August 1856 in Wiesbaden, died 21 June 1929 in Zurich) was a German and Swiss mathematician and historian of mathematics.

== Education and career ==
Rudio's father and maternal grandfather were both public officials in the independent Duchy of Nassau, which was annexed by Prussia when Rudio was 10. He was educated at the local gymnasium and Realgymnasium in Wiesbaden, and then in 1874 began studying at ETH Zurich, then known as the Eidgenössische Polytechnikum Zürich. His initial courses in Zurich were in civil engineering, but in his second year (under the influence of Karl Geiser) he switched to mathematics and physics. Finishing at Zurich in 1877, he went on to graduate studies at the University of Berlin from 1877 to 1880, earning his Ph.D. under the joint supervision of Ernst Kummer and Karl Weierstrass. Next, Rudio returned to ETH Zurich, earning his habilitation in 1881 and becoming at that time a privatdozent. He became an extraordinary professor at Zurich in 1885, and a full professor in 1889.

Rudio was one of the organizers of the first International Congress of Mathematicians (ICM) in 1897. He served as General Secretary of the congress, and as editor of the proceedings of the congress. He was the editor of the quarterly journal of the Zürich Natural Sciences Society from 1893 until 1912, and was also president of the society.

In 1919, the University of Zurich gave Rudio an honorary doctorate. By 1928, he was in poor health, and retired from his position at Zurich. He died a year later.

== Contributions ==
Rudio's research ranged over group theory, abstract algebra, and geometry. His thesis research concerned the use of differential equations to characterize surface by the properties of their sets of centers of curvature, and he was also known for the first proof of convergence of Viète's infinite product for π. He also authored the textbook Die Elemente Der Analytischen Geometrie, in analytic geometry, published in 1908.

Beginning in 1883, with a speech Rudio gave at a celebration of the centennial of Leonhard Euler's death, Rudio became interested in Euler's life and works. At the first ICM and again at a celebration in 1907 of Euler's 200th birthday, Rudio urged the compilation of a set of Euler's complete works. In 1909 the Swiss Society of Natural Sciences took up the project and appointed Rudio as editor. He finished two volumes of this project, and assisted in the editing of the next three. He gave a talk Mitteilungen über die Eulerausgabe (news about the Euler edition) at the fifth ICM in Cambridge, England in August 1912. By the time he retired as general editor of the series in 1928, 20 volumes of the series had been published of what would eventually be over 80 volumes.

Other work in the history of mathematics by Rudio included the book Der Bericht des Simplicius über die Quadraturen des Antiphon und des Hippokrates (1902) on the ancient problem of squaring the circle, and a collection of biographies of mathematicians including Gotthold Eisenstein.

Teubner Verlag published Rudio's 2-volume work, Die Elemente der analytischen Geometrie. Erster Theil: Die analytische Geometrie der Ebene (1888) and Die Elemente der analytischen Geometrie. Zweiter Theil: Die analytische Geometrie des Raumes (1901), which went through several editions over two decades. According to Percey F. Smith, the work was "deservedly popular in Germany."
