= Rudolf Fueter =

Swiss mathematician (1880–1950)

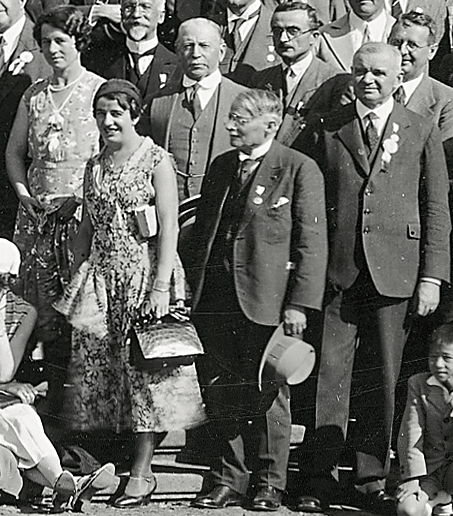
- Rudolf Fueter (2nd from right) at the International Congress of Mathematicians, Zürich 1932
- Born: 30 June 1880; Basel, Switzerland
- Died: 9 August 1950 (aged 70); Brunnen, Switzerland
- Education: University of Göttingen
- Scientific career
- Fields: Mathematics
- Workplaces: University of Zurich
- Doctoral advisor: David Hilbert
- Doctoral students: Max Gut; Verena Haefeli-Huber; Alexander Weinstein

Karl Rudolf Fueter (30 June 1880 – 9 August 1950) was a Swiss mathematician, known for his work on number theory.

== Biography ==
After a year of graduate study of mathematics in Basel, Fueter began study in 1899 at the University of Göttingen and completed his Promotion in 1903 with dissertation Der Klassenkörper der quadratischen Körper und die komplexe Multiplikation under David Hilbert. After his Promotion, Fueter studied for 1 year in Paris, 3 months in Vienna, and 6 months in London. In 1905 he completed his Habilitierung at the University of Marburg. Fueter worked as a docent in 1907/1908 at Marburg and in the winter of 1907/1908 at the Bergakademie Clausthal. He was called to positions as professor ordinarius in 1908 at Basel, in 1913 at the Technische Hochschule Karlsruhe, and in 1916 at the University of Zurich. From 1920 to 1922 he was the rector of the University of Zurich.

Fueter did research on algebraic number theory and quaternion analysis proposing a definition of ‘regular’ for quaternionic functions similar to the definition of holomorphic function by means of an analogue of the Cauchy-Riemann equations. He also published a proof of the Fueter–Pólya theorem with George Pólya.

In 1910 he was one of the founders of the Swiss Mathematical Society and he became its first president. With Andreas Speiser he was instrumental in the editing and publication of the collected works of Leonhard Euler and from 1927 he was the head of the Euler Commission. He gave plenary lectures at the International Congress of Mathematicians in 1932 at Zurich (Idealtheorie und Funktionentheorie) and in 1936 at Oslo (Die Theorie der regulären Funktionen einer Quaternionenvariablen). During WWII he was a colonel of artillery in the Swiss army, an outspoken opponent of German National Socialism, and an advocate for freedom of the press. Fueter was an editor for the Commentarii Mathematici Helvetici.

Fueter married in 1908 and had a daughter.

== Selected works ==
- Synthetische Zahlentheorie. 3rd edition DeGruyter, Berlin 1930 (1st edition 1917).
- Vorlesungen über die singulären Moduln und die komplexe Multiplikation der elliptischen Funktionen. Teubner, Leipzig 1924/1927
1. 142 pages 1924.
2. pp. 144–358. 1927.
- Das mathematische Werkzeug des Chemikers, Biologen, Statistikers und Soziologen. Vorlesung über die höheren mathematischen Begriffe in Verbindung mit ihren Anwendungen (publ. Schweizerische Mathematische Gesellschaft; vol. 3). 3rd edition Orell Füssli, Zürich 1947 (1st edition 1926).
- Der Klassenkörper der quadratischen Körper und die complexe Multiplication. Dieterich, Göttingen 1903 (Dissertation, Universität Göttingen 1903).
- Die Theorie der Zahlenstrahlen. Reimer, Berlin 1905 (Habilitationsschrift, University of Marburg 1905).

== Sources ==
- Johann Jakob Burckhardt (1961). "Fueter, Karl Rudolf". Neue Deutsche Biographie (in German). Vol. 5. Berlin: Duncker & Humblot. p. 707. (full text online).
- Siegfried Gottwald, Hans-Joachim Ilgauds, Karl-Heinz Schlote (eds.): Lexikon bedeutender Mathematiker. Verlag Deutsch, Thun 1990, ISBN 3-8171-1164-9.
