= Fueter–Pólya theorem =

Theorem on quadratic pairing functions

The Fueter–Pólya theorem, first proved by Rudolf Fueter and George Pólya, states that the only quadratic polynomial pairing functions are the Cantor polynomials.

== Introduction ==
In 1878, Georg Cantor showed that the so-called Cantor polynomial

$$P(x,y) := \frac{1}{2} ((x+y)^2+3x+y) = \frac{x^2 + 2xy+ 3x + y^2 + y}2 =
x + \frac{(x+y)(x+y+1)}2  = \binom{x}1 + \binom{x+y+1}{2}$$

is a bijective mapping from $\N^2$ to $\N$. The polynomial given by swapping the variables is also a pairing function.

Fueter was investigating whether there are other quadratic polynomials with this property, and concluded that this is not the case assuming $P(0,0)=0$. He then wrote to Pólya, who showed the theorem does not require this condition.

=== Statement ===
If $P$ is a real quadratic polynomial in two variables whose restriction to $\N^2$ is a bijection from $\N^2$ to $\N$ then it is

$$P(x,y) := \frac{1}{2} ((x+y)^2+3x+y)$$

or

$$P(x,y) := \frac{1}{2} ((y+x)^2+3y+x).$$

=== Proof ===
The original proof is surprisingly difficult, using the Lindemann–Weierstrass theorem to prove the transcendence of $e^a$ for a nonzero algebraic number $a$. In 2002, M. A. Vsemirnov published an elementary proof of this result.

== Fueter–Pólya conjecture ==
The theorem states that the Cantor polynomial is the only quadratic pairing polynomial of $\N^2$ and $\N$. The conjecture is that these are the only such pairing polynomials, of any degree.

== Higher dimensions ==
A generalization of the Cantor polynomial in higher dimensions is as follows:

$$P_n(x_1,\ldots,x_n) = \sum_{k=1}^n \binom{k-1+\sum_{j=1}^k x_j}{k} = x_1 + \binom{x_1+x_2+1}{2} + \cdots +\binom{x_1+\cdots +x_n+n-1}{n}$$

The sum of these binomial coefficients yields a polynomial of degree $n$ in $n$ variables. This is just one of at least $(n-1)!$ inequivalent packing polynomials for $n$ dimensions.

== Bibliography ==
- Cantor, Georg (1878). "Ein Beitrag zur Mannigfaltigkeitslehre". Journal für die reine und angewandte Mathematik (in German). 84: 242–258.
- Chowla, P. (1961). "On some polynomials which represent every natural number exactly once". Det Kongelige Norske Videnskabers Selskab Forhandlinger (Trondheim). 34: 8–9.
- Fueter, Rudolf; Pólya, Georg (1923). "Rationale Abzählung der Gitterpunkte" (PDF). Vierteljahrsschrift der Naturforschenden Gesellschaft in Zürich (in German). 68: 380–386.
- Sánchez Flores, Adolfo (1995). "A family of (n−1)! Diagonal polynomial orders of N^{n}". Order. 12 (2): 173–187. doi:10.1007/BF01108626.
- Smoryński, Craig (1991). Logical Number Theory I: An Introduction. Springer-Verlag. doi:10.1007/978-3-642-75462-3. ISBN 3-540-52236-0.
- Vsemirnov, M. A. (2002) [Russian original: Algebra i Analiz 13 (2001), no. 5, 1–15]. "Two elementary proofs of the Fueter–Pólya theorem on pairing polynomials". St. Petersburg Mathematical Journal. 13 (5): 705–715. Correction: ibid. 14 (2003), no. 5, p. 887.
