= Daniel Christian Fueter =

Swiss-American silversmith and medalist

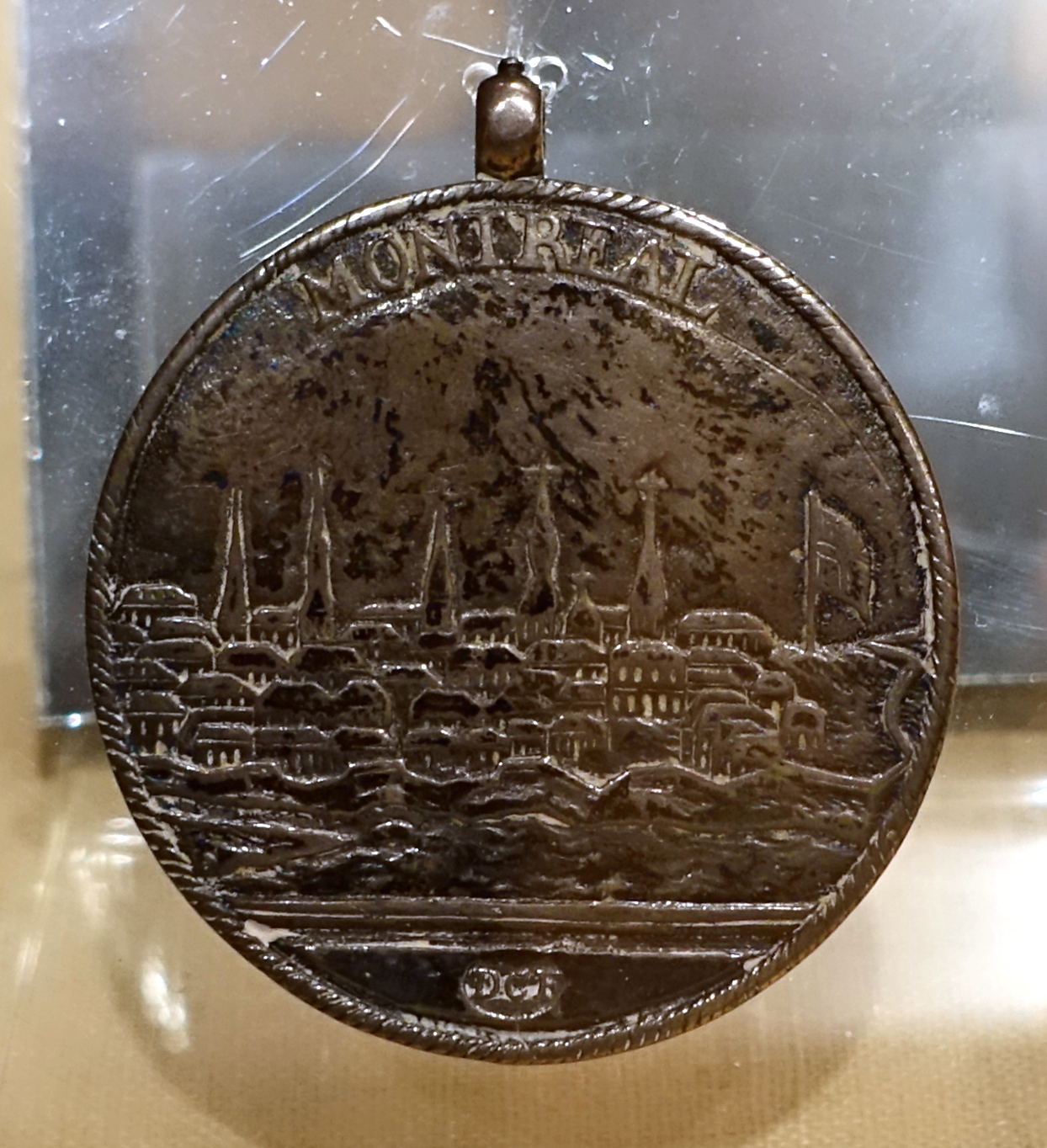
Medal bestowed on a Native American chief for the storming of Montreal by the British in 1760, by Daniel Christian Fueter, 1761

Daniel Christian Fueter (1720–1785), whose name was variously written as Fouaitier and Fouetter, was a Swiss-American silversmith and medalist, active in New York City from about 1754 until 1764 or 1766.

Fueter was born in Bern, Switzerland, where he worked as a goldsmith until 1749. After he took part in a failed political conspiracy, he was condemned to death, and fled to London. His son, the medalist Christian Fueter, was born in London in 1752, and Fueter himself is mentioned in W. Chaffee's Gilda Aurifabrorum as living in Chelsea, "next door to Man in ye Moon, on the 8th December, 1753." Around 1754 he arrived in New York City, where he was made freeman in 1759 and established his business as gold and silversmith. While in New York, he published a series of advertisements:

Daniel Fueter, Gold and Silver-Smith, Lately arrived in the Snow Irene, Capt. Garrison from London, living back of Mr. Hendrick Van De Waters, Gun-Smith, near the Brew-House of the late Harmanus Rutgers, deceased, makes all sorts of Gold and Silver work, after the newest and neatest Fashion; He also gilds Silver and Metal, and refines Gold and Silver after the best Manner, and makes Essays on all sorts of Metal and Oar; all at a reasonable Rate. N.B. he buys old Gold and Silver Lace, and Gold-Smith's Sweeps.

— The New-York Gazette or the Weekly Post-Boy, May 27, 1754

Daniel Fueter, Silver Smith and Jeweller, next Door to Mr. Peter Curtenius, facing the Oswego Market, Has lately imported: A Beautiful Assortment of Jewellery, which for Elegance and Taste is greatly superior to any Thing hitherto brought to this Place; Consisting of a great Variety of Rings, set knot Fashion, Entourage, Cluster, &c. Viz. Brilliant Diamonds and Rose Diamonds of all Sizes, Rubies, Topazes, Emeralds, Saphirs, and all Kinds of Precious Stones, warranted. Ear-rings of all Sizes, Fashions and Prices; Paste Shoe and knee Buckles, fine Twezer Cases, and Snuff Boxes of curious Workmanship. Also a genteel Parcel of Silver Work, tea Pots, Milk Pots, Sauce Boats, Shoe and knee Buckles, and other Articles too numerous to mention, all extremely Cheap.

N.B. The said Daniel Fueter, importer of the above Goods, who was bred a Jeweller and Goldsmith, will give full Satisfaction to those Gentlemen and Ladies who will honour him with their Custom: and will undertake to execute on the shortest Notice, and as Cheap as may be done in London, any Orders he receives in the several Branches of Jewellery, and Gold or Silver Smith's Work; being furnished with the best of Workmen, and all Requisites for the purpose.

Also he will make exact Assays of all Sorts of Ores and Metals; and will perform Refining and Gilding in the neatest Manner. He gives ready money for old Gold and Silver.

— The New-York Gazette or the Weekly Post-Boy, March 10, 1763

Daniel Fueter, imports Blackwood's true cordial elixir, at 5s. per bottle, for all cold, coughs, sore throats,...

— The New-York Gazette or the Weekly Post-Boy, September 6, 1764

Daniel & Lewis Fueter. — This serves to inform the Public, and our former kind Customers, that we the Subscribers, are return'd to this City, in the House we remov'd out, in Dock-Street, next to Mr. G. Dyckinck's, and purpose to carry on the Business of Gold, Silver-smith's and Jewelry Work, in all its Branches, as also gilding, assaying oar, refining, &c. at the most reasonable rates; and we return Thanks to our former Customers, and assure them and the Public that will be pleased to employ us, that they shall be serv'd with punctuality, and Honour, by their Very oblig'd and humble Servants, Daniel and Lewis Feuter.

— The New York Gazette and the Weekly Mercury, January 30, 1769

Daniel Fueter, Silversmith, from London, Begs Leave to acquaint the Public, that he is removed into the House of Mrs. Pinto, between Mr Sherbroke's, and Mr. M'Cartney's, in Bayard Street, and Jewellery in all its Branches; also Gilding, assaying of Ores, and refining in the exactest Manner; and all at the most reasonable Prices. He also informs the Public that Mr. John Anthony Beau, Chaiser, from Geneva, works with him; where Chaising in general, viz. Snuff Boxes, Watch Cases, &c. &c. is done in the best and cheapest Manner...

— The New-York Gazette and the Weekly Mercury, July 31, 1769

Sometime around 1764 or 1766 he retired and moved to Bethlehem, Pennsylvania. In 1769 political turmoil in Switzerland had subsided, and he returned to live beside Lake Neuchâtel until his death.

His medals include the 1764 George III Indian Peace Medal (also known as the Happy While United Medal), as well as a 1761 medal bestowed on a Native American chief for the storming of Montreal by the British in 1760. His silver is collected in the Metropolitan Museum of Art, Brooklyn Museum, Historic Deerfield, Winterthur Museum, and Yale University Art Gallery.
