= Christian Fueter =

Swiss medalist and mint-master

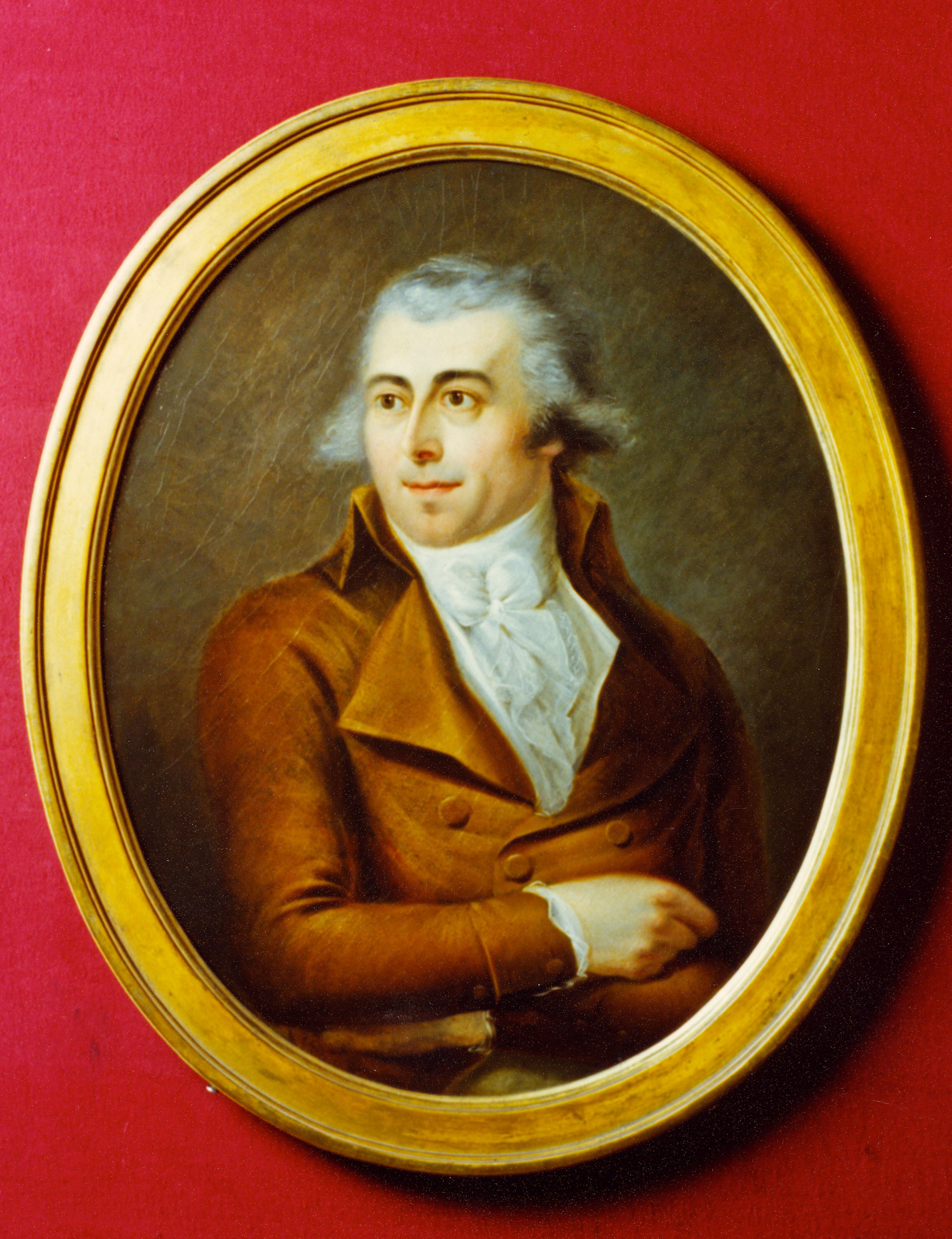
Christian Fueter

Christian Fueter (June 2, 1752 – January 19, 1844) was a Swiss medalist and mint-master at Bern from 1792 to 1837.

Fueter was born in London, the youngest son of Daniel Christian Fueter, a goldsmith who had taken refuge in England for political reasons. His family moved to New York City around 1754, and afterwards resided at Bethlehem, Pennsylvania, where young Fueter received his first training in drawing. He returned to Switzerland in 1769 with his father and settled in Berne, where he studied the art of engraving on steel and precious stones under the celebrated artist Johann Melchior Morikofer. He then went to Paris, where he worked for Graff, Schultze, the renowned painter Jean-Baptiste Greuze, and others.

Fueter's skill as a gold- and silversmith, and talent as an engraver of seals and medals, made him suitable for the post of Master of the Mint at Bern, a position for which he was recommended by patrons and friends such men as Jenner von Brunnadern and the old magistrate von Steiger. As a preliminary, the government sent him to visit the mints of Strassburg, Frankfort, Augsburg, Munich, Nuremberg, Dresden, and London, to better perfect his technique. In 1791, Fueter returned to Bern and was duly installed as mint-master. In this role, he introduced the French system of currency to Bern and the Concordat-cantone at the end of the eighteenth century. When the Republic of Bern fell in 1798, Fueter was able to hide part of the Mint's treasury from the French. Upon creation of the Helvetic Republic, the new government reinstated the Mintmaster in his post.

During his long career produced a large number of dies, mostly for coins. As a medallist, Fueter set Johann Carl Hedlinger before himself as a pattern. One of his earliest medals was engraved in 1786; it commemorates the inauguration of an orphanage. His well-known medals include one commemorating the Battle of Laupen, and one known as the "Insel-Medaille". his well-known medal of General Pasquale Paoli is executed in Hedlinger's style. At that time the currency for all of Switzerland was struck at Bern, Basle, and Soleure, and from the dies engraved by Fueter. Landolt ascribes to him the Thaler of the Helvetic Republic, struck at Bern in 1799, as well as the following coins of Appenzell: Thaler of 1812 (illustrated); Half-Thaler of 1812; Half Schweizer Franken of 1809, &c.; also : 10 Batzen, Batzen, and Angster of Lucerne, 1811, and Thaler of 1813, &c. Fueter also distinguished himself also as a Gem-engraver; one of his best cameos is a portrait of Voltaire.
