= Andreas Speiser =

Swiss mathematician (1885–1970)

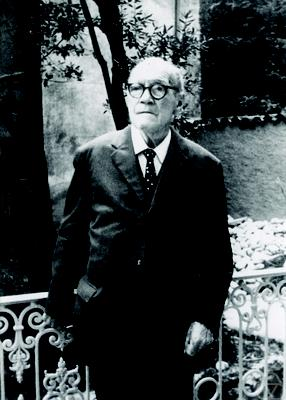
- Born: June 10, 1885
- Died: October 12, 1970 (aged 85)
- Education: University of Göttingen
- Scientific career
- Fields: Mathematics
- Workplaces: University of Zurich
- Doctoral advisor: David Hilbert
- Doctoral students: Johann Jakob Burckhardt

Andreas Speiser (June 10, 1885 – October 12, 1970) was a Swiss mathematician and philosopher of science.

== Life and work ==
Speiser studied in Göttingen, starting in 1904, notably with David Hilbert, Felix Klein, Hermann Minkowski. In 1917 he became full-time professor at the University of Zurich but later relocated in Basel. During 1924/25 he was president of the Swiss Mathematical Association.

Speiser worked on number theory, group theory, and the theory of Riemann surfaces. He organized the translation of Leonard Dickson's seminal 1923 book Algebras and Their Arithmetics (Algebren und ihre Zahlentheorie, 1927), which was heavily influenced by the work on the theory of algebras done by the schools of Emmy Noether and Helmut Hasse. Speiser also added an appendix on ideal theory to Dickson's book. Speiser's book Theorie der Gruppen endlicher Ordnung is a classic, richly illustrated work on group theory. In this book, there are group theoretical applications in Galois theory, elementary number theory, and Platonic solids, as well as extensive studies of ornaments, such as those that Speiser studied on a 1928 trip to Egypt.

Speiser also worked on the history of mathematics and was the chief editor for the Euler Commission's edition of Leonhard Euler's Opera Omnia and the editor of the works of Johann Heinrich Lambert. As a philosopher Speiser was chiefly concerned with Plato and wrote a commentary on the Parmenides Dialogue, but he was also an expert of the philosophies of Plotinus and Hegel.

Speiser's doctoral students include J. J. Burckhardt.

== Writings ==
- Die Theorie der Gruppen von endlicher Ordnung – mit Anwendungen auf algebraische Zahlen und Gleichungen sowie auf die Kristallographie. Springer 1923 (1st edition), 1927 (2nd edition), 1937 (3rd edition); Birkhäuser 1956.
- Klassische Stücke der Mathematik. Orell Füssli 1925 (mit Abdruck von Quellen, u.a. auch Dante, Rousseau).
- Leonhard Euler und die Deutsche Philosophie. Orell Füssli 1934.
- Leonhard Euler. In: Große Schweizer. Atlantis Verlag, Zürich 1939, 1940, S.1-6.
- Die mathematische Denkweise. Rascher 1932, Birkhäuser 1945, 1952.
- Leonhard Euler. Vortrag gehalten an der Generalversammlung des S.I.A. in Basel am 11. September 1949. Schweizerische Bauzeitung, Jg.67, Nr.48. 26. November 1949, Zürich.
- Elemente der Philosophie und Mathematik. Birkhäuser 1952.
- Die Geistige Arbeit. Birkhäuser 1955 (Vorträge).
- Ein Parmenideskommentar – Studien zur Platonischen Dialektik. Koehler, Leipzig, Stuttgart, 1937, 1959.
- Ueber Riemannsche Flächen. Comm.Math.Helvetici (CMH), Bd.2, 1930, S.284-293.
- Zur Theorie der Substitutionsgruppen. Mathematische Annalen, Bd. 75, 1914, S.443-448.
- Zahlentheoretische Sätze aus der Gruppentheorie. Math.Zeitschrift Bd.5, 1919, S. 1-6.
- Naturphilosophische Untersuchungen von Euler und Riemann. Crelle Journal Bd. 157, 1927, S.105-114.
- Zahlentheorie in rationalen Algebren. CMH, Bd.8, 1936, S.391-406.
- Riemann'sche Flächen vom hyperbolischen Typus. CMH Bd.10, 1937, S.232-242.
- Geometrisches zur Riemannschen Zetafunktion. Mathematische Annalen Bd.110, 1934, S.514-521.
- Einteilung der sämtlichen Werke Leonhard Eulers. CMH Bd.20, 1947, S. 288-318.

== See also ==
- Hilbert–Speiser theorem
- Jordan–Schur theorem
