= Ferdinand Gonseth =

Swiss mathematician and philosopher

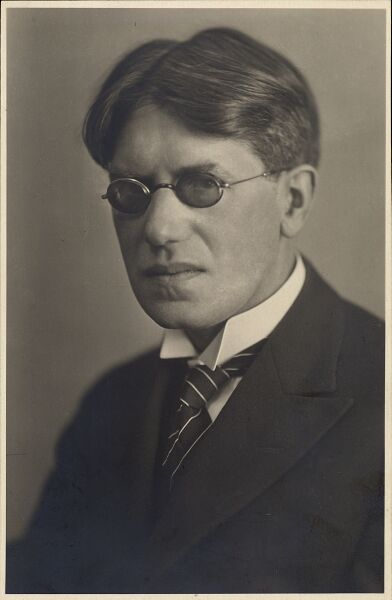
Ferdinand Gonseth

Ferdinand Gonseth (1890–1975) was a Swiss mathematician and philosopher.

He was born on 22 September 1890 at Sonvilier, the son of Ferdinand Gonseth, a clockmaker, and his wife Marie Bourquin. He studied at La Chaux-de-Fonds, and read physics and mathematics at ETH Zurich, from 1910 to 1914.

In 1929 Gonseth succeeded Jérôme Franel as Professor of Higher Mathematics at ETH. In 1947 he founded Dialectica, with Paul Bernays and Gaston Bachelard. In the same year he took the newly created chair of philosophy of science at ETH.

Gonseth died on 17 December 1975 at Lausanne. He was noted for his "open philosophy", according to which science and mathematics lacked absolute foundations. See Idoneism.
