= Commentarii Mathematici Helvetici =

Mathematical quarterly from Switzerland

- Discipline: Mathematics
- Language: English
- Edited by: Eva Bayer-Fluckiger

Publication details
- History: 1929-present
- Publisher: European Mathematical Society on behalf of the Swiss Mathematical Society (Switzerland)
- Frequency: Quarterly
- Open access: Delayed
- Impact factor: 0.854 (2019)

Standard abbreviations
- ISO 4: Comment. Math. Helv.

Indexing
- CODEN: COMHAX
- ISSN: 0010-2571 (print); 1420-8946 (web)
- LCCN: 30013731
- OCLC no.: 243417054

Links
- Journal homepage; Online access; Online archive

The Commentarii Mathematici Helvetici is a quarterly peer-reviewed scientific journal in mathematics. The Swiss Mathematical Society (SMG) started the journal in 1929 after a meeting in May of the previous year. The Swiss Mathematical Society still owns and operates the journal; the publishing is currently handled on its behalf by the European Mathematical Society. The scope of the journal includes research articles in all aspects in mathematics. The editors-in-chief have been Rudolf Fueter (1929–1949), J.J. Burckhardt (1950–1981), P. Gabriel (1982–1989), H. Kraft (1990–2005), and Eva Bayer-Fluckiger (2006–present).

== Abstracting and indexing ==
The journal is abstracted and indexed in:

- Chemical Abstracts Service
- Current Contents/Physical, Chemical & Earth Sciences
- MathSciNet
- Mir@bel
- Science Citation Index Expanded
- Scopus
- Zentralblatt MATH

According to the Journal Citation Reports, the journal has a 2019 impact factor of 0.854.

== History ==
The idea for a society-owned research journal emerged in June 1926, when the SMG petitioned the Swiss Confederation for a CHF 3,500 subsidy "to establish its own scientific journal" and thus raise the international profile of Swiss mathematics. A special commission drafted the project, and at the spring meeting in Bern on 20 May 1928 the Society approved it; before year's end the first issue of Commentarii Mathematici Helvetici (CMH) appeared. To secure its future, the "Foundation for the Promotion of Mathematical Sciences in Switzerland" was created at an extraordinary members' meeting on 16 June 1929 and registered by the end of that year. From the outset the journal was governed by a six-yearly elected editorial committee—comprising a president, general secretary, assistant secretary and all former SMG presidents—while Orell Füssli was appointed publisher and a Latin title chosen to avoid favouring any one national language.

Under its founding statutes, CMH was to publish only original research by Swiss or resident scholars, in one of the three national languages, subject to approval by the editorial committee. Subscription rates were set at CHF 15 for members and CHF 25 for non-members, and from 1928 to 1956 federal subsidies rose stepwise from CHF 1,000 to CHF 8,500, supplemented by income from subscriptions and by foundation grants—initially CHF 450 and rising to CHF 1,930 by 1936. Rudolf Fueter served as the first general secretary, promoting the journal and securing its finances; in April 1938 he wrote that without CMH "Swiss mathematics would again be dependent on the goodwill of foreign states".

Through the mid-20th century CMH remained under SMG oversight while its editorial structures and funding adapted to changing conditions. In 1951, the Society confirmed a new editorial regime and consultative body to accompany the six-year cycle, and in 1964 its foundation began sponsoring an information service for seminars and research notices. When the Swiss Academy of Natural Sciences curtailed support in the early 1990s, CMH emphasised its international reputation and ultimately—in 2005—transferred production and distribution from Birkhäuser to the EMS Publishing House in Zürich. Subscriber numbers, which peaked at 912 in 1973, stood at about 550 in 2008.
