= Elemente der Mathematik =

Scientific journal about mathematics

- Discipline: Mathematics
- Language: English

Publication details
- History: 1947–present
- Publisher: European Mathematical Society on behalf of the Swiss Mathematical Society

Standard abbreviations
- ISO 4: Elem. Math.

Indexing
- ISSN: 0013-6018 (print); 1420-8962 (web)

Links
- Journal homepage

Elements of Mathematics 1946 Title page

Elemente der Mathematik is a peer-reviewed scientific journal covering mathematics. It is published by the European Mathematical Society Publishing House on behalf of the Swiss Mathematical Society. It was established in 1946 by Louis Locher-Ernst, and transferred to the Swiss Mathematical Society in 1976. Rather than publishing research papers, it focuses on survey papers aimed at a broad audience.

== History ==
The journal Elemente der Mathematik was founded in 1946 by Louis Locher-Ernst under the patronage of the Swiss Mathematical Society (SMG) to disseminate pedagogical and expository articles in mathematics and physics. Locher-Ernst outlined the scope and objectives—emphasising support for secondary and tertiary instruction—in a letter to the SMG president in August 1945 and at the autumn members' meeting in Fribourg later that year. Early editorial responsibilities were assumed by Locher-Ernst alongside Erwin Voellmy, Ernst Trost and Paul Buchner, while an endowment fund was established within the first decade to secure the journal's financial stability. From its launch at CHF 6 per annum, the subscription price rose modestly to CHF 10 by 1952, reflecting the growing volume of articles and teaching reports published in its pages.

In 1976 the SMG formally assumed editorial oversight of Elemente der Mathematik, integrating it alongside its other scholarly publications. This transition followed negotiations with the Birkhäuser publishing house, whose editorial office and distribution were later transferred to the EMS Publishing House in 2005. A major reorganisation in the early 1990s saw the appointment of a new editorial board and the adoption of TeX in 1992, modernising typesetting and enabling enhanced technical presentation. Further changes in 2000 expanded the editorial team to include representatives from both Swiss and international institutions, ensuring the journal remained responsive to evolving educational needs.

Financial support for Elemente der Mathematik has combined income from subscriptions with grants from the SMG's own Foundation for the Promotion of Mathematical Sciences, contributions from the Swiss National Science Foundation (SNF) and sponsorship by educational and industrial partners. Subscriber numbers reached a high of roughly 740 in Switzerland and 500 abroad around 1969, before settling to circa 440 by 2008 amid changing readership patterns. Through its continuous publication and periodic editorial renewal, Elemente der Mathematik has maintained a mission to present current and accessible mathematical topics to a broad audience, from secondary teachers to practising researchers.

== Abstracting and indexing ==
The journal is abstracted and indexed in:

- Emerging Sources Citation Index
- MathSciNet
- Mir@bel
- Zentralblatt MATH
