= List of mathematical societies =

This article provides a list of mathematical societies.

== International ==
- African Mathematical Union
- Association for Women in Mathematics
- Circolo Matematico di Palermo
- European Mathematical Society
- European Society for Mathematical and Theoretical Biology
- European Women in Mathematics
- Foundations of Computational Mathematics
- International Association for Cryptologic Research
- International Association of Mathematical Physics
- International Council for Industrial and Applied Mathematics
- International Linear Algebra Society
- International Mathematical Union
- International Society for Analysis, its Applications and Computation
- International Society for Mathematical Sciences
- International Statistical Institute
- Kurt Gödel Society
- Mathematical Council of the Americas (MCofA)
- Mathematical Optimization Society
- Mathematical Society of South Eastern Europe (MASSEE)
- Quaternion Association
- Ramanujan Mathematical Society
- Society for Industrial and Applied Mathematics
- Southeast Asian Mathematical Society (SEAMS)
- Spectra (mathematical association)
- Unión Matemática de América Latina y el Caribe (UMALCA)
- Young Mathematicians Network

== Honor societies ==
- Kappa Mu Epsilon
- Mu Alpha Theta
- Pi Mu Epsilon

== National and subnational ==
This list is sorted by continent. Country and/or subregion/city is given if not specified in name.

=== Africa ===
- Algeria Mathematical Society
- Gabon Mathematical Society
- South African Mathematical Society

=== Asia ===
- Bangladesh Mathematical Society
- Calcutta Mathematical Society, Kolkata, India
- Chinese Mathematical Society
- Indian Mathematical Society
- Iranian Mathematical Society
- Israel Mathematical Union
- Kerala Mathematical Association, Kerala State, India
- Korean Mathematical Society, South Korea
- Mathematical Society of Japan
- Mathematical Society of the Philippines
- Nepal Mathematical Society
- Pakistan Mathematical Society

=== Europe ===
- Albanian Mathematical Association
- Armenian Mathematical Union
- Austrian Mathematical Society
- Catalan Mathematical Society, Spain
- Cyprus Mathematical Society
- Czech Mathematical Society
- Danish Mathematical Society
- Edinburgh Mathematical Society, UK
- Estonian Mathematical Society
- Finnish Mathematical Society
- French Mathematical Society
- Georgian Mathematical Union
- German Mathematical Society
- Hellenic Mathematical Society, Greece
- Icelandic Mathematical Society
- Institute of Mathematics and its Applications, UK
- Irish Mathematical Society
- Italian Mathematical Union
- János Bolyai Mathematical Society, Hungary
- Kharkov Mathematical Society, Kharkiv, Ukraine
- Kosovar Mathematical Society
- Kyiv Mathematical Society, Kyiv, Ukraine
- Latvian Mathematical Society
- Lithuanian Mathematical Society
- London Mathematical Society, UK
- Luxembourg Mathematical Society
- Malta Mathematical Society
- Mathematical Association, UK
- Mathematical Society of the Republic of Moldova
- Moscow Mathematical Society, Russia
- Norwegian Mathematical Society
- Norwegian Statistical Association
- Polish Mathematical Society
- Portuguese Mathematical Society
- Romanian Mathematical Society
- Royal Dutch Mathematical Society
- Royal Spanish Mathematical Society
- Royal Statistical Society, UK
- Society of Applied Mathematics and Mechanics, Germany
- Slovak Mathematical Society
- Society of Mathematicians, Physicists and Astronomers of Slovenia
- Spanish Society of Statistics and Operations Research
- St. Petersburg Mathematical Society, Russia
- Swedish Mathematical Society
- Swiss Mathematical Society
- Trinity Mathematical Society, Cambridge, UK
- Turkish Mathematical Society
- Union of Bulgarian Mathematicians

=== North America ===
- American Mathematical Society
- Canadian Mathematical Society
- Mathematical Association of America
- National Association of Mathematicians, US
- Sociedad Matemática Mexicana (SMM), Mexico

=== Central America ===
- Asociación Matemática Hondureña (ASOMATH), Honduras
- Sociedad Cubana de Matemática y Computación (SCMC), Cuba

=== South America ===
- Argentine Mathematical Union
- Asociación Argentina de Matemática Aplicada Computacional e Industrial (ASAMACI)
- Brazilian Mathematical Society
- Colombian Mathematical Society
- Sociedad Boliviana de Matemáticas, Bolivia
- Sociedad de Matemática de Chile, Chile
- Sociedad Ecuatoriana de Matemática, Ecuador
- Sociedad Matemática Paraguaya, Paraguay
- Venezuelan Mathematical Association

=== Oceania ===
- Australian Mathematical Society
- New Zealand Mathematical Society

== See also ==
- List of academic statistical associations
- Category:Mathematical societies
