= Qaiser Mushtaq =

Pakistani mathematician

- Born: 28 February 1954 (age 72); Sheikhupura, Pakistan
- Citizenship: Pakistan
- Education: University of the Punjab; Quaid-i-Azam University; University of Oxford.
- Known for: His work on the Coset diagrams, Group theory (mathematics); LA-semigroups
- Awards: Chowla Medal (1977); Abdus Salam Award (1987); Mathematician of the Year (1987); Gold Medal of Honour (US) (1987); Mathematician of the Year (Pakistan) (1990); M. Raziuddin Siddiqi Gold Medal (Pakistan) (1991); 5th Khwarizmi Award (1992); Young Scientist of the South Award (TWAS, Italy) (1993); 5th National Education Award (1999); Gold Medal in Mathematics (Pakistan) (2000)
- Scientific career
- Fields: Mathematics
- Workplaces: Quaid-e-Azam University (Qau); Oxford University; Mathematical Sciences Research Institute (MSRI); Harvard University; Massachusetts Institute of Technology (MIT); Southampton University; Institute for Basic Research (IBR); The Islamia University of Bahawalpur
- Doctoral advisor: Graham Higman
- Other academic advisors: Gian-Carlo Rota

Qaiser Mushtaq (born 28 February 1954), (D.Phil.(Oxon), ASA, KIA), is a Pakistani mathematician and academic who has made numerous contributions in the field of group theory and semigroup. He was vice-chancellor of the Islamia University Bahawalpur from December 2014 to December 2018. Mushtaq is one of the leading mathematicians and educationists in Pakistan. Through his research and writings, he has exercised a profound influence on mathematics in Pakistan. Mushtaq is an honorary full professor at the Mathematics Division of the Institute for Basic Research, Florida, US.

His research contributions in the fields of group theory and Left Almost Semigroup (LA-semigroup) theory have won him recognition at both national and international levels. In Graham Higman's words, "he has laid the foundation of coset diagrams for the modular group", to study the actions of groups on various spaces and projective lines over Galois fields. This work has been cited in the Encyclopedia of Design Theory.

== Biography ==
Qaiser Mushtaq was born in Sheikhupura, Pakistan to Pir Mushtaq Ali and Begum Saghira Akhter, and belongs to the Qureshi family of Gujranwala. He is a descendant of Shah Jamal Nuri. Mushtaq married Aileen Qaiser, a senior journalist educated from the National University of Singapore and Wolfson College, Oxford. They have two daughters, Shayyan Qaiser and Zara Qaiser.

He received primary education from the Convent of Jesus and Mary, Sialkot, and secondary education from Government Pilot Secondary School, Sialkot. Mushtaq studied for a certain period at Murray College till his family moved to Rawalpindi, where he studied at Gordon College. He did his MSc and M.Phil. from Quaid-i-Azam University, Islamabad. He then joined Bahauddin Zakariya University, Multan, as a lecturer for a period of one year before returning to Quaid-i-Azam University in 1979. Later, in 1980, he received the Royal Scholarship to do his D.Phil. at Wolfson College, Oxford. He was a doctoral student of Graham Higman and was awarded a doctorate in 1983 for a thesis entitled Coset Diagrams for the Modular Group. In 1990 he was at the Abdus Salam International Centre for Theoretical Physics, Trieste, Italy, as a visiting mathematician. He also worked as an associate professor at the Universiti Brunei Darussalam from 1993 to 1999, after which he returned to Pakistan.

Mushtaq is a tenured professor at Quaid-i-Azam University, and a former syndicate member, Quaid-i-Azam University, Islamabad. He is also an honorary full professor at the Mathematics Division, Institute for Basic Research, Florida, US.

He served as vice chancellor of The Islamia University of Bahawalpur from 19 December 2014 to December 2018.

== Research in mathematics ==
He has parametrised actions of the modular group on projective lines over Galois fields. This method has proven to be so effective and rewarding, that its wide uses can be seen in Combinatorial Group Theory, Algebraic Number Theory, and Theory of Group Graphs. His graphical technique helped to solve George Abram Miller's problem (1901) on alternating groups as homomorphic images of the modular group.

He has also invented a new algebraic structure known as Locally Associative LA-semigroup, and has done some fundamental research on LA-semigroups producing some significant results in this theory. Consequently, a number of useful mathematical results have emerged which otherwise were applicable under restricted conditions only.

Mushtaq has collaborated in research with the late Graham HigmanFRS (Oxford) and the late Gian-Carlo Rota (MIT). He has been an invited speaker at Oxford University, MSRI Berkeley, Harvard University, Massachusetts Institute of Technology and Southampton University; and an invited speaker at several international conferences.

He has supervised, as a sole supervisor, the highest number of M.Phil. and PhD students in Pure Mathematics in Pakistan (see the Mathematics Genealogy Project). As a result, he has established a research group in Pakistan, the largest of its kind, which is producing high level original research in mathematics.

=== Research papers ===
Mushtaq has over a hundred research papers to his credit. He has written and edited several books, some of which are, Mathematics: The Islamic Legacy (which received a prize from the National Book Council of Pakistan), published by UNESCO and other international publishers; A Course in Group Theory, and Discrete Lectures in Mathematics. He has also written books on topics other than mathematics. They are, Focus on Pakistan, and Pakistan: An Introduction. He was also an invited writer for the monumental book, comprising six volumes, entitled the History of Civilizations of Central Asia, published by UNESCO (translated into several foreign languages).

He is also known for his analytical writings and research articles on history, mathematics, science, education, and philosophy. He has been an active opposer of the use of impact factors and citation counts of the Higher Education Commission. He led the movement against its use which he believed has damaged the growth of mathematics in Pakistan. One of his essays was published by the American Mathematical Society. The International Mathematical Union has included it in its report on the use of impact factors. Mushtaq also founded the mathematical quarterly, PakMS Newsletter, in Pakistan.

=== Journals and bulletins ===
He is an editor of the Asian-European Journal of Mathematics (World Scientific). He is an associate editor of the Bulletin of the Southeast Asian Mathematical Society (Springer-Verlag). Additionally, he is an editor of the Quasigroups and Related Systems (Maldova Academy of Sciences) and the Bulletin of the Malaysian Mathematical Society, an advisory editor of the Journal of Interdisciplinary Mathematics, an associate editor of the journal Advances in Algebra and Analysis, a reviewer for the Mathematical Reviews of the American Mathematical Society (US) and the Zentrablatt fur Mathematik (Springer-Verlag, Germany).

== Honours and awards ==
He was an overseas scholar of the Royal Commission for the Exhibition of 1851 in 1980 and a senior Fulbright Scholar in 1990. Mushtaq was elected an associate member of the International Centre for Theoretical Physics, Trieste, Italy in 1991.

Mushtaq has been awarded several awards due to his contribution to mathematical sciences.

- Chowla Medal (1977)
- Salam Prize in Mathematics (1987)
- Mathematician of the Year Award (1987) by the National Book Council of Pakistan
- Gold Medal of Honour (1987) from United States
- Mathematician of the Year Award (1990) by the National Book Council of Pakistan
- M. Raziuddin Siddiqi Gold Medal (1991) from the Pakistan Academy of Sciences
- First Khwārizmī Award (1992) from the President of Iran
- Young Scientist of the South Award (1993) from Third World Academy of Sciences, Italy
- 5th National Education Award (1999) by the National Education Forum
- Gold Medal in Mathematics (2000) from the Pakistan Academy of Sciences.

== Academic societies ==
Mushtaq founded the Pakistan Mathematical Society. He also founded the series of international conferences, namely IPMC, in Pakistan. The conference takes place every August in Islamabad.

He is a member of the American Mathematical Society, the Oxford Society, the London Mathematical Society, and the Punjab Mathematical Society. He has been the president of the Brunei Darussalam Mathematics Society, and he is the current president of the Pakistan Mathematical Society.

Mushtaq helped to start the Islamic Society at Oxford. He was its vice-president and secretary in 1980 to 1983. He also helped to rejuvenate the Oxford University Pakistan Society of which he was the vice-president from 1981 to 1982.

In Pakistan, he started the 'Mathematical Seminar Series' at Quaid-i-Azam University in 1983 and developed it into an institution recognised nationally. At Quaid-i-Azam University, he founded the 'Algebra Forum' which has held advanced level seminars on algebra in particular and on various academic topics of general interest. He reformed and restructured the Mathematical Society of Brunei Darussalam as its president.
