= Merrilyn Goos =

Australian mathematician

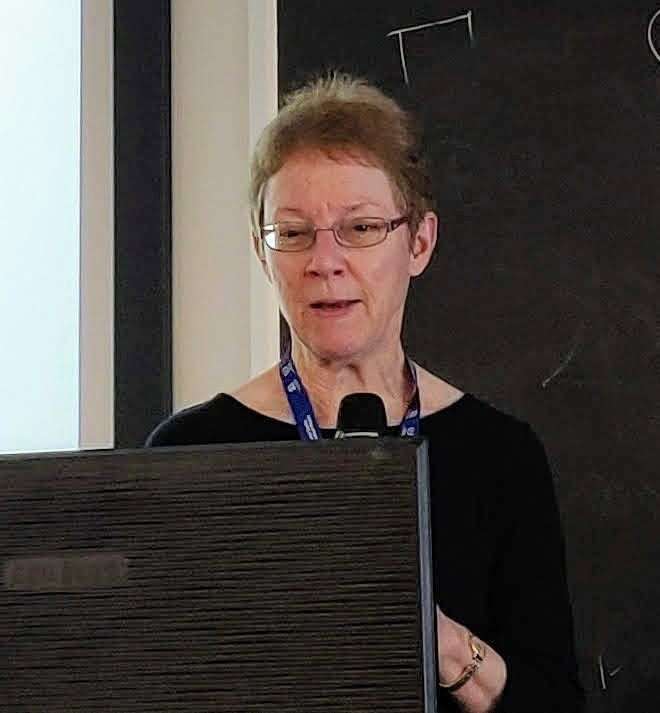
- Professor Merrilyn Goos in 2019
- Born: Merrilyn Goos
- Scientific career
- Workplaces: University of Limerick

Merrilyn Goos is an Australian mathematics educator. From October 2017 to June 2021, she was Professor of STEM Education and Director of EPI*STEM at the University of Limerick, Ireland. She then returned to Queensland to take up a position at the University of the Sunshine Coast.

From 2012 to 2017 Goos was professor and head of the School of Education at the University of Queensland, and prior to this was Director of the Teaching and Educational Development Institute at The University of Queensland. She has taught in mathematics education and in 2003 she received the university's Award for Excellence in Teaching.

== Qualifications ==
Goos has Associate and Licentiate Teachers Diplomas in Speech and Drama from Trinity College London, a B.Sc., Diploma, Master's degree in educational studies, and Ph.D. from the University of Queensland, and a Graduate Diploma in Reading from Griffith University.

== Professional associations ==
Goos was president of the Mathematics Education Research Group of Australasia, past vice-president of the Queensland Association of Mathematics Teachers, and past chair of the Queensland Studies Authority's Mathematics Syllabus Advisory Committee.

In 2004 she won an Office for Learning and Teaching teaching award for her work as a mathematics teacher educator, and in 2006 was awarded national fellowships to investigate assessment leadership in higher education institutions.
