= National Mathematical Society of Pakistan =

Pakistani non-profit entity

National Mathematical Society of Pakistan Applied Mathematical Society
- Abbreviation: NMSP
- Predecessor: None
- Formation: February 20, 2010; 16 years ago
- Type: Scientific think tank
- Headquarters: Mathematical Research Laboratories
- Location: Lahore, Punjab Province
- Region served: South Asia
- Official language: English; Urdu
- President: Prof. Dr. Ahmad Mahmood Qureshi
- Affiliations: International Mathematical Union; American Mathematical Society; Pakistan Mathematical Society

The National Mathematics Society of Pakistan (NMSP), is an academic, non-profit, and scientific society of applied mathematicians and engineers dedicated to the development and promotion of applied mathematics at all levels. The society is aim to serve as the national community by organizing seminars, workshops, competitions, meetings and publications.

Established in 2010, the society was initially headquartered in Abdus Salam School of Mathematical Sciences (AS-SMS), at the Government College University, Lahore. It is working abroad to come and be a part of the international mathematical society and exchange ideas and skills with the other members of the society in Pakistan. It is currently the adhering organization of the International Mathematical Union on Pakistan.

On 2015, the Abdus Salam Shield Of Honor in Mathematics was initiated by NMSP to promote and recognize quality research in Mathematics. The first Shield was given to Prof. Hassan Azad from KFUPM in February 2016.

On 2017, NSMP initiated the Abdus Salam Medal for Mathematics to recognise the young and senior mathematicians at national and international levels for their excellent performance. The first recipients were Dr. Ayesha Asloob Qureshi from Sabancı University and Dr. Sahibzada Waleed Noor from University of Campinas.
