= Union of Slovak Mathematicians and Physicists =

Learned society in Slovakia

- Jednota slovenských matematikov a fyzikov
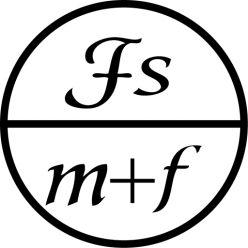
- Abbreviation: JSMF
- Formation: 1 January 1969; 57 years ago
- Type: Learned society
- Headquarters: Bratislava
- Location: Slovakia
- President: Martin Kalina
- Website: www.jsmf.eu

The Union of Slovak Mathematicians and Physicists (Slovak: Jednota slovenských matematikov a fyzikov, JSMF) is a learned society in Bratislava, founded in January 1969. Martin Kalina has been president of the JSMF since 2008.

The JSMF is composed of two sections, the Physical Section (Slovak: Fyzikálna sekcia, not to be confused with the Slovak Physical Society, Slovenská fyzikálna spoločnosť) and the Slovak Mathematical Society (Slovak: Slovenská matematická spoločnosť). The JSMF is an associated organisation of the Slovak Academy of Sciences, and is the adhering organisation of the International Mathematical Union for Slovakia.

== History ==
The origins of the JSMF lie in the Association for Free Lectures in Mathematics and Physics (Czech: Spolek pro volné prědnášky z mathematiky a fysiky), a learned society founded in Prague in 1862. Out of the Association was born the Union of Czech Mathematicians (Czech: Jednota cěských mathematiků) in May 1869, which in 1912 changed its name to the Union of Czech Mathematicians and Physicists (Czech: Jednota českých mathematiků a fysiků). In 1921 the society changed its name again, to the Union of Czechoslovak Mathematicians and Physicists (Czech: Jednota cěskoslovenských mathematiků a fysiků, JČMF). This name was used from 1921 to 1939 and again from 1945 to 1993, until the dissolution of Czechoslovakia.

In 1969 Czechoslovakia became a federal state and the Slovak Socialist Republic gained more political autonomy, which led the creation of the Union of Slovak Mathematicians and Physicists within the JČMF.

== The Slovak Mathematical Society ==
Slovak Mathematical Society
- Slovenská matematická spoločnosť
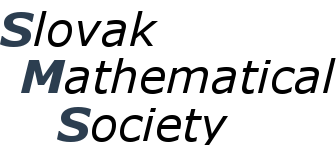
- Abbreviation: SMS
- Type: Mathematical society
- President: Martin Kalina
- Awards: Academician Schwarz Prize; Bartoš Prize
- Website: www.math.sk/sms/

The Slovak Mathematical Society (Slovak: Slovenská matematická spoločnosť, SMS) is the mathematical branch of the JSMF, and through its parent organisation is recognised by the International Mathematical Union. The SMS is independently a full member of the European Mathematical Society. Martin Kalina has been president of the SMS since 2017.

The SMS holds an annual conference attended by both research mathematicians and mathematics school teachers. At the conference the SMS awards its two prizes:

- The Academician Schwarz Prize, named for Štefan Schwarz, is awarded to a mathematician under the age of 30.
- The Peter Pavol Bartoš Prize, named for Peter Pavol Bartoš, is awarded to a mathematics teacher.

Together with the Czech Mathematical Society, the SMS organises annual Czech-Slovak student conferences.

== See also ==
- List of mathematical societies
