= Mumtaz Ali (disambiguation) =

Mumtaz Ali is a name, and may refer to:

- Sayyid Mumtaz Ali (1860–1935), Muslim scholar and women rights advocate
- Mumtaz Ali (1905–1974), Indian dancer and character actor
- Mumtaz Ali Kazi (1928–1999), Pakistani scientist
- Mumtaz Ali Khan (politician) (1926/7–2021), Cabinet Minister of BJP in Karnataka
- Mumtaz Ali Shah, Pakistani civil servant
- Mumtaz Ali Khan Chang, Pakistani politician
- Mumtaz Ali Chandio, Pakistani politician
- Mumtaz Ali Bhutto (1933–2021), Pakistani politician
