= Muhammad Raziuddin Siddiqui =

Pakistani theoretical physicist and mathematician

Raziuddin Siddiqui رضی الدین صدیقی
- Raziuddin Siddiqui (second right).
- Born: Muhammad Raziuddin Siddiqui; 8 January 1908; Hyderabad, Hyderabad State, British India (present-day India)
- Died: 8 January 1998 (aged 90); Islamabad, Pakistan
- Citizenship: Pakistani
- Education: Osmania University, India; University of Cambridge, UK; University of Leipzig, Germany
- Known for: His work on Nuclear energy, theory of Relativity and Simultaneity, C*-algebra, Nuclear space (in mathematics), and Paramagnetism; Pakistan and weapons of mass destruction
- Awards: Sitara-i-Imtiaz (1960); Hilal-i-Imtiaz (1981); Nishan-e-Imtiaz (1998)
- Scientific career
- Fields: Theoretical physics
- Workplaces: Pakistan Atomic Energy Commission; United Kingdom Atomic Energy Authority; Commission for Atomic Energy; Quaid-e-Azam University; University of Sindh; University of Peshawar; Osmania University; University of Paris; Pakistan Mathematical Society
- Doctoral advisor: Albert Einstein

Muhammad Raziuddin Siddiqui, FPAS, NI, HI, SI (Urdu: محمد رضی الدین صدیقی, [rəzɪ.ʊd̪ːiːn sɪˈd̪ːiːqi]; (8 January 1908 – 8 January 1998), also known as Dr. Razi, was a Pakistani theoretical physicist and a mathematician who played a role in Pakistan's education system, and Pakistan's indigenous development of nuclear weapons. An educationist and a scientist, Siddiqui established educational research institutes and universities in his country.

During the 1940s in Europe, he contributed in mathematical physics and worked on general relativity and the theory of relativity, nuclear energy, and quantum gravity. He was one of the notable students of Albert Einstein.

He had been the vice-chancellor of four Pakistani universities, and the first vice-chancellor of Quaid-e-Azam University and served as the Emeritus professor of Physics there until his death in 1998.

== Biography ==
=== Life and education ===
Raziuddin Siddiqui was born on 8 January 1908 in Hyderabad- Deccan, India to Mohammed Muzaffer uddin Siddiqui and Baratunnisa Begum. His family consisted of one elder brother, Mohammed Zakiuddin Siddiqui and two sisters, Abida Begum and Sajida Begum, he was the youngest in the family. He attended the newly established Osmania University. After passing the Rashidia Exams in 1918, Siddiqui completed his matriculation from Osmania University in 1921, and earned a Bachelor of Arts (BA) in mathematics, with distinction, in 1925. Through marriage, he was related to another well-known scientist who played a significant role in Pakistan: Nazir Ahmed.

=== Siddiqui in Europe ===
Siddiqui was then awarded a scholarship from the Government of the State of Hyderabad to pursue higher studies in United Kingdom where he completed his MA in mathematics, under Paul Dirac from the University of Cambridge in 1928. Then, he proceeded further to work for his PhD at the University of Leipzig in Germany (Weimar Republic).

He studied mathematics and quantum mechanics under Albert Einstein. He completed his PhD in theoretical physics, writing a brief research thesis on the Theory of relativity and the nuclear binding energy. He did his post doctoral work at the University of Paris, France.

== Research in theoretical physics ==
In Europe, while Siddique was working on his post-doctoral research at the Paris University, he had the opportunity to meet with the members of "The Paris Group" where he had led the discussions on unsolved problems in physics and in mathematics. During his stay in Great Britain, he studied Quantum mechanics and published scientific papers at the Cavendish Laboratory.

=== Return to India ===
In 1931, Siddiqui then returned to Hyderabad, British Indian Empire, and joined Osmania University there as an associate professor of mathematics. During 1948–49, he served as vice-chancellor of Osmania, appointed by the governor of Andhra Pradesh.

=== Move to Pakistan ===
After the Partition of India led to the independence of Pakistan in 1947, at the request of the Government of Pakistan, Siddiqui migrated to Karachi, Pakistan in 1950, along with some of his family. His brother Zakiuddin and one of his sisters, Sajida Begum, remained in Hyderabad, India with their families and parents. His father Muzaffer uddin Siddiqui died while his visit to Raziuddin Siddiqui in Pakistan later in his years.

In Karachi, Siddiqui joined the Karachi University's teaching faculty and taught as professor of applied mathematics there. In 1953, he was simultaneously appointed to the post of vice-chancellor of the University of Sindh and the University of Peshawar. Siddiqui founded the first mathematical society in Pakistan in 1952 by the name of "All Pakistan Mathematics Association", and remained its president until 1972. In 1956, Siddiqui helped establish Nuclear power in Pakistan and its expansion in the country by first joining the newly established Pakistan Atomic Energy Commission (PAEC) and then establishing the first science directorate on mathematical physics.

In 1964, he moved to Islamabad, where he joined PAEC. There he began his academic research in theoretical physics. In 1965, with the establishment of Quaid-e-Azam University (QAU), Siddiqui was appointed as its first vice-chancellor by the then foreign minister Zulfikar Ali Bhutto. He was one of the first professors of Physics at Quaid-e-Azam University where he also served as the chairman of the Physics Department. He continued his tenure until 1972, when he rejoined PAEC at the request of Prime Minister Bhutto. During the 1960s, he helped convince President of Pakistan Ayub Khan to make a proposed university a research institution. He, at first, established the "Institute of Physics" at the QAU, and invited Professor Riazuddin to be its first director, and the dean of the faculty. Then, Riazuddin, with the help of his mentor, Dr. Abdus Salam, convinced the then PAEC chairman Dr. Ishrat Hussain Usmani to send all the theoreticians to the Institute of Physics to form a physics group. This established the "Theoretical Physics Group" (TPG), which later designed nuclear weapons for Pakistan.

With the establishment of TPG, Siddiqui began to work with Abdus Salam, and on his advice began research in Theoretical Physics at PAEC. In 1970, he established the Mathematical Physics Group (MPG) at PAEC, where he led academic research in advanced mathematics. He also delegated mathematicians to PAEC to specialise in their fields at the MPG Division of PAEC.

=== Pakistani nuclear weapons program ===
After the Indo-Pakistani War of 1971, Siddiqui joined the Pakistan Atomic Energy Commission (PAEC) at the request of Prime Minister Zulfikar Ali Bhutto. Siddiqui was the first full-time Technical Member of PAEC and was responsible for preparation of its charter.

During the 1970s, Siddiqui worked on problems in theoretical physics with Pakistani theoretical physicists in the nuclear weapons programme. Previously, he had worked in Europe, including carrying out nuclear research in the British nuclear weapon program, and the French atomic program. At PAEC, he became a mentor to some of the country's academic scientists. At PAEC, he was the director of the Mathematical Physics Group (MPG) and was tasked with performing mathematical calculations involved in nuclear fission and supercomputing. While both MPG and Theoretical Physics Group (TPG) had reported directly to Abdus Salam, Siddiqui co-ordinated each meeting with the scientists of TPG and mathematicians of the MPG. At PAEC, he directed the mathematical research directly involving the theory of general relativity, and helped establish the quantum computers laboratories at PAEC.

Since theoretical physics plays a major role in identifying the parameters of nuclear physics, Siddiqui started the work on special relativity's complex applications, the 'relativity of simultaneity'. His Mathematical Physics Group undertook the research and performed calculations on the 'relativity of simultaneity' during the process of weapon detonation, where multiple explosive energy rays are bound to release in the same isolate and close medium at the same time interval.

=== Post-war ===
After his work at PAEC, Siddiqui again joined Quaid-e-Azam University's Physics Faculty. As professor of physics, he continued his research at the Institute of Physics, QAU. He helped develop the higher education sector, and placed mainframe policies in the institution.

== Death and legacy ==
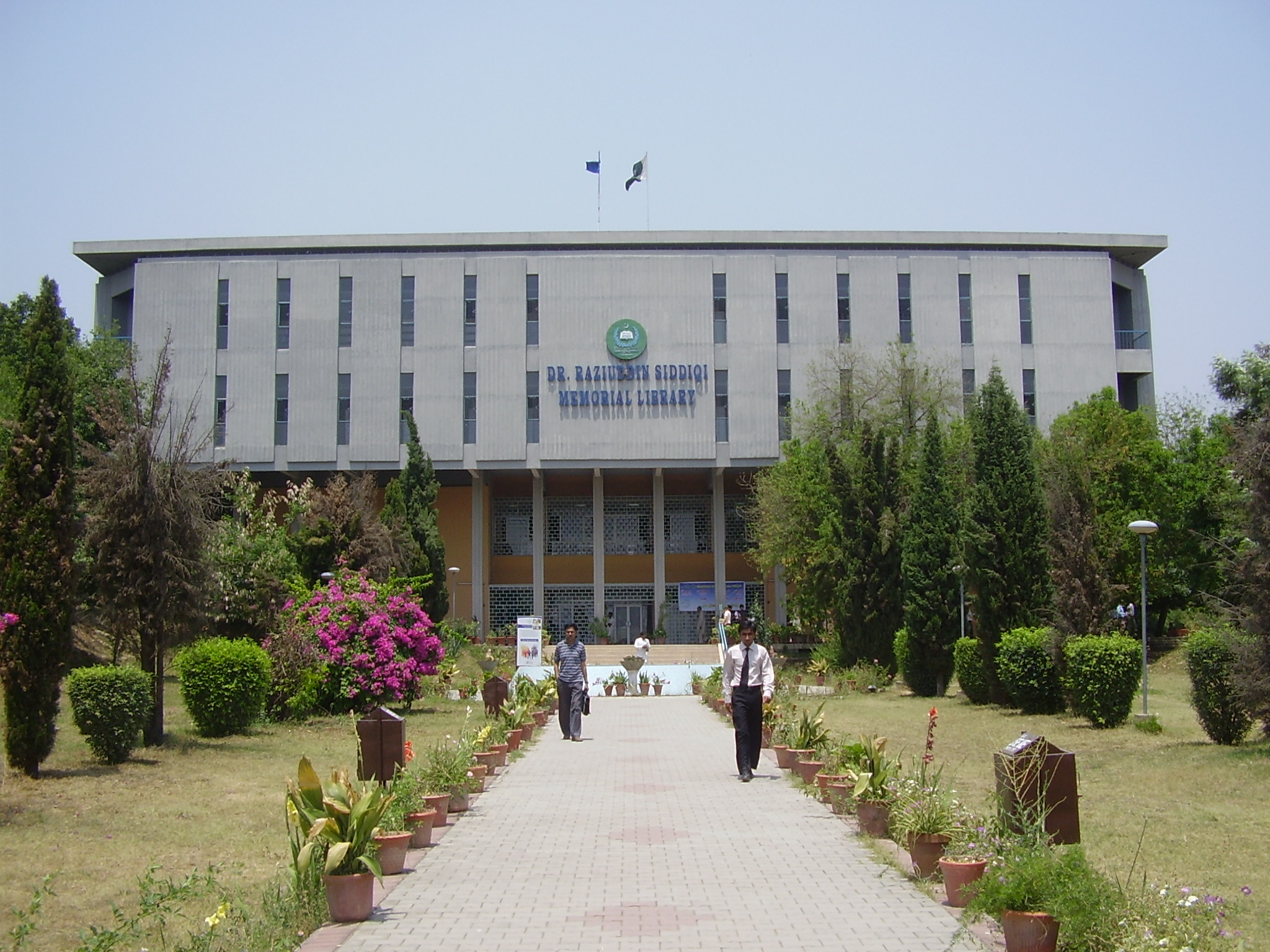
Dr.Raziuddin Siddiqui Memorial Library is named after Dr. Muhammad Raziuddin Siddiqui at the Quaid-i-Azam University

Siddiqui remained in Islamabad, and had associated himself with Quaid-e-Azam University. In 1990, he was made professor emeritus of Physics and Mathematics there. He died on 8 January 1998, at the age of 90. Siddiqui's biography was written by scientists who had worked with him. In 1960, due to his efforts to expand education, he was awarded the third-highest civilian award of Pakistan, Sitara-i-Imtiaz, from the then-President of Pakistan, Field Marshal Ayub Khan.

In 1981, he was awarded the second highest civilian award, Hilal-i-Imtiaz, from President General Muhammad Zia-ul-Haq due to his efforts in Pakistan's atomic program, and for popularising science in Pakistan. In May 1998, the Government of Pakistan awarded him the highest civilian award, the Nishan-i-Imtiaz, posthumously by Prime Minister Nawaz Sharif when Pakistan conducted its first successful nuclear tests, 'Chagai-I'.

== Family ==
His eldest daughter, Dr. Shirin Tahir-Kheli, is a former special assistant to the president of the United States of America, and Senior Adviser for women's empowerment.

== Civil awards ==
- Sitara-i-Imtiaz (1960)
- Hilal-i-Imtiaz (1981)
- Nishan-e-Imtiaz (1998)
- Gold Medal, Pakistan Academy of Sciences (1950)
- Gold Medal, Pakistan Mathematical Society (1980)
- Gold Medallion, Pakistan Physical Society (1953)
- Doctorate of Science Honoris Causa, Osmania University (1938)

== Books ==
- Quantum Mechanics and its Physics
- Dastan-e-Riazi (The Tale of Mathematics)
- Izafiat
- Tasawur-e-Zaman-o-Makaan
- Experiences in science and education by M. Raziuddin Siddiqui, published in 1977.
- Establishing a new university in a developing country: Policies and procedures by M. Raziuddin Siddiqui, published in 1990.

== See also ==
- Abdus Salam
- Salimuzzaman Siddiqui
- Quaid-i-Azam University
- Nuclear weapon
