= International Mathematical Union =

International non-governmental organisation

- IMU logo based on the Borromean rings
- Legal status: Unincorporated association, recognized as a charitable organization by the internal revenue service of Berlin, Germany
- Location: IMU Secretariat, Hausvogteiplatz 11A, D-10117 Berlin, Germany
- President: Hiraku Nakajima
- Parent organization: International Science Council
- Website: mathunion.org

The International Mathematical Union (IMU) is an international organization devoted to global cooperation in the field of mathematics. It is a member of the International Science Council (ISC) and supports the International Congress of Mathematicians (ICM). Its members are national mathematics organizations from more than 80 countries.

The objectives of the International Mathematical Union are: promoting international cooperation in mathematics, supporting and assisting the International Congress of Mathematicians and other international scientific meetings/conferences, acknowledging outstanding research contributions to mathematics through the awarding of scientific prizes, and encouraging and supporting other international mathematical activities, considered likely to contribute to the development of mathematical science in any of its aspects, whether pure, applied, or educational.

== History ==
The IMU was established in 1920, but dissolved in September 1932 and reestablished in 1950 at the Constitutive Convention in New York, de jure on September 10, 1951, when ten countries had become members. The last milestone was the General Assembly in March 1952, in Rome, Italy where the activities of the new IMU were inaugurated and the first Executive Committee, President and various commissions were elected. In 1952 the IMU was also readmitted to the ICSU. The past president of the Union is Carlos Kenig (2019–2022). The current president is Hiraku Nakajima.

At the 16th meeting of the IMU General Assembly in Bangalore, India, in August 2010, Berlin was chosen as the location of the permanent office of the IMU, which was opened on January 1, 2011, and is hosted by the Weierstrass Institute for Applied Analysis and Stochastics (WIAS), an institute of the Gottfried Wilhelm Leibniz Scientific Community, with about 120 scientists engaging in mathematical research applied to complex problems in industry and commerce.

== Commissions and committees ==
IMU has a close relationship to mathematics education through its International Commission on Mathematical Instruction (ICMI). This commission is organized similarly to IMU with its own Executive Committee and General Assembly.

Developing countries are a high priority for the IMU and a significant percentage of its budget, including grants received from individuals, mathematical societies, foundations, and funding agencies, is spent on activities for developing countries. Since 2011 this has been coordinated by the Commission for Developing Countries (CDC).

The Committee for Women in Mathematics (CWM) is concerned with issues related to women in mathematics worldwide. It organizes the World Meeting for Women in Mathematics $((\mathrm{WM})^2)$ as a satellite event of ICM.

The International Commission on the History of Mathematics (ICHM) is operated jointly by the IMU and the Division of the History of Science (DHS) of the International Union of History and Philosophy of Science (IUHPS).

The Committee on Electronic Information and Communication (CEIC) advises IMU on matters concerning mathematical information, communication, and publishing.

== Prizes ==
The scientific prizes awarded by the IMU, in the quadrennial International Congress of Mathematicians (ICM), are deemed to be some of the highest distinctions in the mathematical world. These are:

- the Fields Medals (two to four awarded per Congress, since 1936);
- the IMU Abacus Medal (previously known as the Rolf Nevanlinna Prize; awarded since 1986);
- the Carl Friedrich Gauss Prize (since 2006);
- the Chern Medal (since 2010); and
- the Leelavati Award (since 2010).

== Membership and General Assembly ==
The IMU's members are Member Countries and each Member country is represented through an Adhering Organization, which may be its principal academy, a mathematical society, its research council or some other institution or association of institutions, or an appropriate agency of its government. A country starting to develop its mathematical culture and interested in building links with mathematicians all over the world is invited to join IMU as an Associate Member. For the purpose of facilitating jointly sponsored activities and jointly pursuing the objectives of the IMU, multinational mathematical societies and professional societies can join IMU as an Affiliate Member. Every four years, the IMU membership gathers in a General Assembly (GA), which consists of delegates appointed by the Adhering Organizations, together with the members of the executive committee. All important decisions are made at the GA, including the election of the officers, establishment of commissions, the approval of the budget, and any changes to the statutes and by-laws.

=== Members and associate members ===
The IMU has 83 (full) Member countries and two Associate Members (Bangladesh and Paraguay, marked below by light grey background).

| Country | Adhering Society | National mathematics societies (Note: Mathematical societies that appear in the preceding column are not repeated in this column.) |
|---|---|---|
| Algeria | Société Mathématique d’Algérie | |
| Argentina | Unión Matemática Argentina | |
| Armenia | Institute of Mathematics, National Academy of Sciences of RA | Armenian Mathematical Union |
| Australia | Australian Academy of Science | Australian Mathematical Society; Australian Association of Mathematics Teachers |
| Austria | Austrian Academy of Sciences | Austrian Mathematical Society |
| Bangladesh (Note: Associate member) | Bangladesh Mathematical Society | |
| Belarus | Institute of Mathematics, National Academy of Sciences of Belarus | |
| Belgium | The Royal Academies for Science and the Arts of Belgium | Belgian Mathematical Society |
| Bosnia and Herzegovina | Bosnian Mathematical Society | |
| Brazil | Sociedade Brasileira de Matemática | Associação Brasileira de Estatística; Associação Nacional dos Professores de Matemática na Educação Básica; Sociedade Brasileira de Educação Matemática; Sociedade Brasileira de História da Matemática; Sociedade Brasileira de Matemática Aplicada e Computacional |
| Bulgaria | Bulgarian Academy of Sciences | Union of Bulgarian Mathematicians |
| Cameroon | Cameroon Mathematical Union | |
| Canada | National Research Council of Canada | Canadian Mathematical Society; Canadian Society for the History and Philosophy of Mathematics; Statistical Society of Canada; Canadian Applied and Industrial Mathematics Society |
| Chile | Sociedad de Matemática de Chile | |
| China | Chinese Mathematical Society; Mathematical Society of the Republic of China | |
| Colombia | Sociedad Colombiana de Matemáticas | |
| Croatia | Croatian Mathematical Society | |
| Cuba | Universidad de la Habana | |
| Cyprus | Department of Mathematics and Statistics, University of Cyprus | |
| Czech Republic | Union of Czech Mathematicians and Physicists | Czech Mathematical Society (Note: Branch of the Union of Czech Mathematicians & Physicists) |
| Denmark | Det Kongelige Danske Videnskabernes Selskab | Danish Mathematical Society |
| Ecuador | Sociedad Ecuatoriana de Matemática | |
| Egypt | Academy of Scientific Research and Technology | Egyptian Mathematical Society |
| Estonia | Estonian Academy of Sciences | Estonian Mathematical Society |
| Finland | Council of Finnish Academies | Finnish Mathematical Society |
| France | Comité National Français des Mathématiciens | Société Française de Statistique; Société de Mathématiques Appliquées et Industrielles; Société Mathématique de France |
| Georgia | Georgian Mathematical Union | |
| Germany | Deutsche Mathematiker-Vereinigung | Gesellschaft für Angewandte Mathematik und Mechanik; Gesellschaft für Didaktik der Mathematik |
| Greece | Academy of Athens | Greek Mathematical Society |
| Hong Kong | The Hong Kong Mathematical Society | |
| Hungary | János Bolyai Mathematical Society | |
| Iceland | Icelandic Mathematical Society | |
| India | Indian National Science Academy | |
| Indonesia | The Indonesian Mathematical Society | |
| Iran | Iranian Mathematical Society | |
| Ireland | Irish Mathematical Society | |
| Israel | Israel Academy of Sciences and Humanities | Israel Mathematical Union |
| Italy | Istituto Nazionale di Alta Matematica Francesco Severi | Unione Matematica Italiana |
| Ivory Coast | Société Mathématique de Côte d'Ivoire | |
| Japan | Science Council of Japan | |
| Kazakhstan | Institute of Mathematics and Mathematical Modeling | |
| Kenya | Mathematics Association of Kenya | |
| South Korea | Korean Mathematical Society | |
| Kyrgyzstan | Mathematical Society of Kyrgyzstan | |
| Latvia | Latvian Mathematical Society | |
| Lithuania | Lithuanian Mathematical Society | |
| Luxembourg | Luxembourg Mathematical Society | |
| Malaysia | The Malaysian Academy of Mathematical Scientists | |
| Mexico | Mexican Mathematical Society | |
| Mongolia | The Mongolian Mathematical Society | |
| Montenegro | Society of Mathematicians and Physicists of Montenegro | Montenegro Mathematical Society |
| Morocco | Le Centre de Recherches Mathématiques de Rabat | |
| Netherlands | Het Koninklijk Wiskundig Genootschap | |
| New Zealand | Royal Society Te Apārangi | New Zealand Mathematical Society |
| Nigeria | Nigerian Mathematical Society | |
| Norway | The Norwegian Academy of Science and Letters | Norwegian Mathematical Society |
| Oman | Sultan Qaboos University | |
| Pakistan | National Mathematical Society of Pakistan | All Pakistan Mathematical Association; Pakistan Mathematical Society; Punjab Mathematical Society |
| Paraguay | Sociedad Matemática Paraguaya | |
| Peru | Sociedad Matematica Peruana | |
| Philippines | Mathematical Society of the Philippines | |
| Poland | Polish Academy of Sciences | Polish Mathematical Society |
| Portugal | Fundação para a Ciência e Tecnologia | Sociedade Portuguesa de Matemática; Sociedade Portuguesa de Estatística |
| Romania | Romanian Academy | Romanian Mathematical Society |
| Russia | Russian Academy of Sciences | Moscow Mathematical Society; St. Petersburg Mathematical Society; Siberian Mathematical Society |
| Saudi Arabia | King Abdulaziz City for Science and Technology | Saudi Association for Mathematical Sciences |
| Senegal | Senegalese Mathematical Society | |
| Serbia | Mathematical Society of Serbia | |
| Singapore | Singapore Mathematical Society | |
| Slovakia | Union of Slovak Mathematicians and Physicists | Slovak Mathematical Society (Note: Part of the Union of Slovak Mathematicians and Physicists) |
| Slovenia | Society of Mathematicians, Physicists and Astronomers of Slovenia | Slovenian Discrete and Applied Mathematics Society |
| South Africa | National Research Foundation | South African Mathematical Society; Association for Mathematics Education of South Africa |
| Spain | Comité Español de Matemáticas | Royal Spanish Mathematical Society; Catalan Mathematical Society; Spanish Statistics and Operations Research Society; Spanish Society of Applied Mathematics; Spanish Society of Research on Mathematics Education; Spanish Federation of Mathematics Teachers Associations |
| Sweden | The Royal Swedish Academy of Sciences | Swedish Mathematical Society |
| Switzerland | Swiss Mathematical Society | |
| Thailand | The Center for Promotion of Mathematical Research of Thailand | |
| Tunisia | Société Mathématique de Tunisie | |
| Turkey | Turkish Mathematical Society | |
| Ukraine | Ukrainian Mathematical Society | Kyiv Mathematical Society; Kharkiv Mathematical Society; Donetsk Mathematical Society; Lviv Mathematical Society; Ivano-Frankivsk Mathematical Society |
| United Kingdom | London Mathematical Society | Edinburgh Mathematical Society; Institute of Mathematics and its Applications; Royal Statistical Society |
| United States | U.S. National Academy of Sciences Board on International Scientific Organizations | American Mathematical Association of Two-Year Colleges; American Mathematical Society; Association of Mathematics Teacher Educators; American Statistical Association; Association for Symbolic Logic; Association for Women in Mathematics; Association of State Supervisors of Mathematics; Benjamin Banneker Association; Institute of Mathematical Statistics; Mathematical Association of America; National Council of Supervisors of Mathematics; National Council of Teachers of Mathematics; Society for Industrial and Applied Mathematics; Society of Actuaries |
| Uruguay | Área Matemática - Programa de Desarrollo de las Ciencias Básicas | |
| Uzbekistan | Uzbek Mathematical Society | |
| Venezuela | Asociación Matemática Venezolana | |
| Vietnam | Vietnam Mathematical Society | |

1. Due to the delicate and contentious political status of Taiwan, China has two Adhering Societies to the IMU, which split the voting rights in the General Assembly. The Chinese Mathematical Society in Beijing has three votes, and the Mathematical Society of the Republic of China, located in Tapei, has two votes.

=== Affiliate members ===
The IMU has five affiliate members:

- African Mathematical Union (AMU)
- European Mathematical Society (EMS)
- Mathematical Council of the Americas (MCofA)
- Southeast Asian Mathematical Society (SEAMS)
- Unión Matemática de América Latina y el Caribe (UMALCA)

== Organization and Executive Committee ==
The International Mathematical Union is administered by an Executive Committee (EC) which conducts the business of the Union. The EC consists of the President, two vice-presidents, the Secretary, six Members-at-Large, all elected for a term of four years, and the Past President. The EC is responsible for all policy matters and for tasks, such as choosing the members of the ICM Program Committee and various prize committees.

== Publications ==
Every two months IMU publishes an electronic newsletter, IMU-Net, that aims to improve communication between IMU and the worldwide mathematical community by reporting on decisions and recommendations of the Union, major international mathematical events and developments, and on other topics of general mathematical interest. IMU Bulletins are published annually with the aim to inform IMU's members about the Union's current activities. In 2009 IMU published the document Best Current Practices for Journals.

== IMU’s Involvement in developing countries ==
The IMU took its first organized steps towards the promotion of mathematics in developing countries in the early 1970s and has, since then supported various activities. In 2010 IMU formed the Commission for Developing Countries (CDC) which brings together all of the past and current initiatives in support of mathematics and mathematicians in the developing world.

Some IMU Supported Initiatives:

- Grants Program for Mathematicians: The Commission for Developing Countries supports research travel of mathematicians based in developing countries as well as mathematics research conferences in the developing world through its Grants Program which is open to mathematicians throughout the developing world, including countries that are not (yet) members of the IMU.
- African Mathematics Millennium Science Initiative (AMMSI) is a network of mathematics centers in sub-Saharan Africa that organizes conferences and workshops, visiting lectureships and an extensive scholarship program for mathematics graduate students doing PhD work on the African continent.
- Mentoring African Research in Mathematics (MARM): IMU supported the London Mathematical Society (LMS) in founding the MARM programme, which supports mathematics and its teaching in the countries of sub-Saharan Africa via a mentoring partnership between mathematicians in the United Kingdom and African colleagues, together with their students. It focuses on cultivating long-term mentoring relations between individual mathematicians and students.
- Volunteer Lecturer Program (VLP) of IMU identifies mathematicians interested in contributing to the formation of young mathematicians in the developing world. The Volunteer Lecturer Program maintains a database of mathematic volunteers willing to offer month-long intensive courses at the advanced undergraduate or graduate level in degree programmes at universities in the developing world. IMU also seeks applications from universities and mathematics degree programmes in the developing world that are in need of volunteer lecturers, and that can provide the necessary conditions for productive collaboration in the teaching of advanced mathematics.

IMU also supports the International Commission on Mathematical Instruction (ICMI) with its programmes, exhibits and workshops in emerging countries, especially in Asia and Africa.

IMU released a report in 2008, Mathematics in Africa: Challenges and Opportunities, on the current state of mathematics in Africa and on opportunities for new initiatives to support mathematical development. In 2014, the IMU's Commission for Developing Countries CDC released an update of the report.

Additionally, reports about Mathematics in Latin America and the Caribbean and South East Asia. were published.

In July 2014 IMU released the report: The International Mathematical Union in the Developing World: Past, Present and Future (July 2014).

== MENAO Symposium at the ICM ==
In 2014, the IMU held a day-long symposium prior to the opening of the International Congress of Mathematicians (ICM), entitled Mathematics in Emerging Nations: Achievements and Opportunities (MENAO). Approximately 260 participants from around the world, including representatives of embassies, scientific institutions, private business and foundations attended this session. Attendees heard inspiring stories of individual mathematicians and specific developing nations.

== Presidents ==
List of presidents of the International Mathematical Union from 1952 to the present:

- 1952–1954: (United States) Marshall Harvey Stone (vice: (France) Émile Borel, (Germany) Erich Kamke)
- 1955–1958: (Germany) Heinz Hopf (vice: (France) Arnaud Denjoy, (United Kingdom) W. V. D. Hodge)
- 1959–1962: (Finland) Rolf Nevanlinna (vice: (Soviet Union) Pavel Alexandrov, (United States) Marston Morse)
- 1963–1966: (Switzerland) Georges de Rham (vice: (France) Henri Cartan, (Poland) Kazimierz Kuratowski)
- 1967–1970: (France) Henri Cartan (vice: (Soviet Union) Mikhail Lavrentyev, (United States) Deane Montgomery)
- 1971–1974: (India) K. S. Chandrasekharan (vice: (United States) Abraham Adrian Albert, (Soviet Union) Lev Pontryagin)
- 1975–1978: (United States) Deane Montgomery (vice: (United Kingdom) J. W. S. Cassels, (Romania) Miron Nicolescu, (Romania) Gheorghe Vrânceanu)
- 1979–1982: (Sweden) Lennart Carleson (vice: (Japan) Masayoshi Nagata, (Soviet Union) Yuri Vasilyevich Prokhorov)
- 1983–1986: (Germany) Jürgen Moser (vice: (Soviet Union) Ludvig Faddeev, (France) Jean-Pierre Serre)
- 1987–1990: (Soviet Union) Ludvig Faddeev (vice: (Austria) Walter Feit, (Sweden) Lars Hörmander)
- 1991–1994: (France) Jacques-Louis Lions (vice: (United Kingdom) John H. Coates, (United States) David Mumford)
- 1995–1998: (United States) David Mumford (vice: (Russia) Vladimir Arnold, (Germany) Albrecht Dold)
- 1999–2002: (Brazil) Jacob Palis (vice: (United Kingdom) Simon Donaldson, (Japan) Shigefumi Mori)
- 2003–2006: (United Kingdom) John M. Ball (vice: (France) Jean-Michel Bismut, (Japan) Masaki Kashiwara)
- 2007–2010: (Hungary) László Lovász (vice: (China) Zhi-Ming Ma, (Italy) Claudio Procesi)
- 2011–2014: (Belgium) Ingrid Daubechies (vice: (France) Christiane Rousseau, (Brazil) Marcelo Viana)
- 2015–2018: (Japan) Shigefumi Mori (vice: (Argentina) Alicia Dickenstein, (New Zealand) Vaughan Jones)
- 2019–2022: (Argentina) Carlos Kenig (vice: (Australia) Nalini Joshi, (South Africa) Loyiso Nongxa)
- 2023–2026: (Japan) Hiraku Nakajima (vice: (United Kingdom) Ulrike Tillmann, (Colombia) Tatiana Toro)
- 2027–2030: (Germany) Ulrike Tillmann (vice: (China) Xuhua He, (Italy) Gigliola Staffilani)
