= AMV =

AMV may refer to:

== Media ==
- AMV (TV program), an Australian television series
- AMV (TV station), an Australian television station
- AMV video format, a proprietary video file format
- AMV BBDO, a British advertising agency
- Animation Music Video, a video consisting of anime or animated clips arranged to a song

== Organizations ==
- The Venezuelan Mathematical Association (Spanish: Asociación Matemática Venezolana, AMV)

== Science ==
- Alfalfa mosaic virus, a plant virus of the family Bromoviridae
- Anterior medullary velum, a part of the structure of the brain
- Avian myeloblastosis virus, a virus of the genus Alpharetrovirus

== Other ==
- Amderma Airport (Амдерма), Russia (IATA airport code "AMV")
- Abandoned medieval village, another designation for the UK's deserted medieval villages (DMVs)
- Patria AMV, a Finnish military vehicle
