= European Mathematical Society =

Mathematical society

- Formation: 28 October 1990; 36 years ago
- Founder: Friedrich Hirzebruch
- Headquarters: Helsinki, Finland, Europe
- Fields: Mathematics
- Members: EMS has as its members around 60 national mathematical societies in Europe, 50 mathematical research centres and departments, and 3000 individuals.
- President: Jan Philip Solovej
- Affiliations: International Mathematical Union
- Website: euromathsoc.org

The European Mathematical Society (EMS) is a European organization dedicated to the development of mathematics in Europe. Its members are different mathematical societies in Europe, academic institutions and individual mathematicians. The current president is Jan Philip Solovej, professor at the Department of Mathematics at the University of Copenhagen.

== Goals ==
The Society seeks to serve all kinds of mathematicians in universities, research institutes and other forms of higher education. Its aims are to

1. Promote mathematical research, both pure and applied,
2. Assist and advise on problems of mathematical education,
3. Concern itself with the broader relations of mathematics to society,
4. Foster interaction between mathematicians of different countries,
5. Establish a sense of identity amongst European mathematicians,
6. Represent the mathematical community in supra-national institutions.

The EMS is itself an Affiliate Member of the International Mathematical Union and an Associate Member of the International Council for Industrial and Applied Mathematics.

== History ==
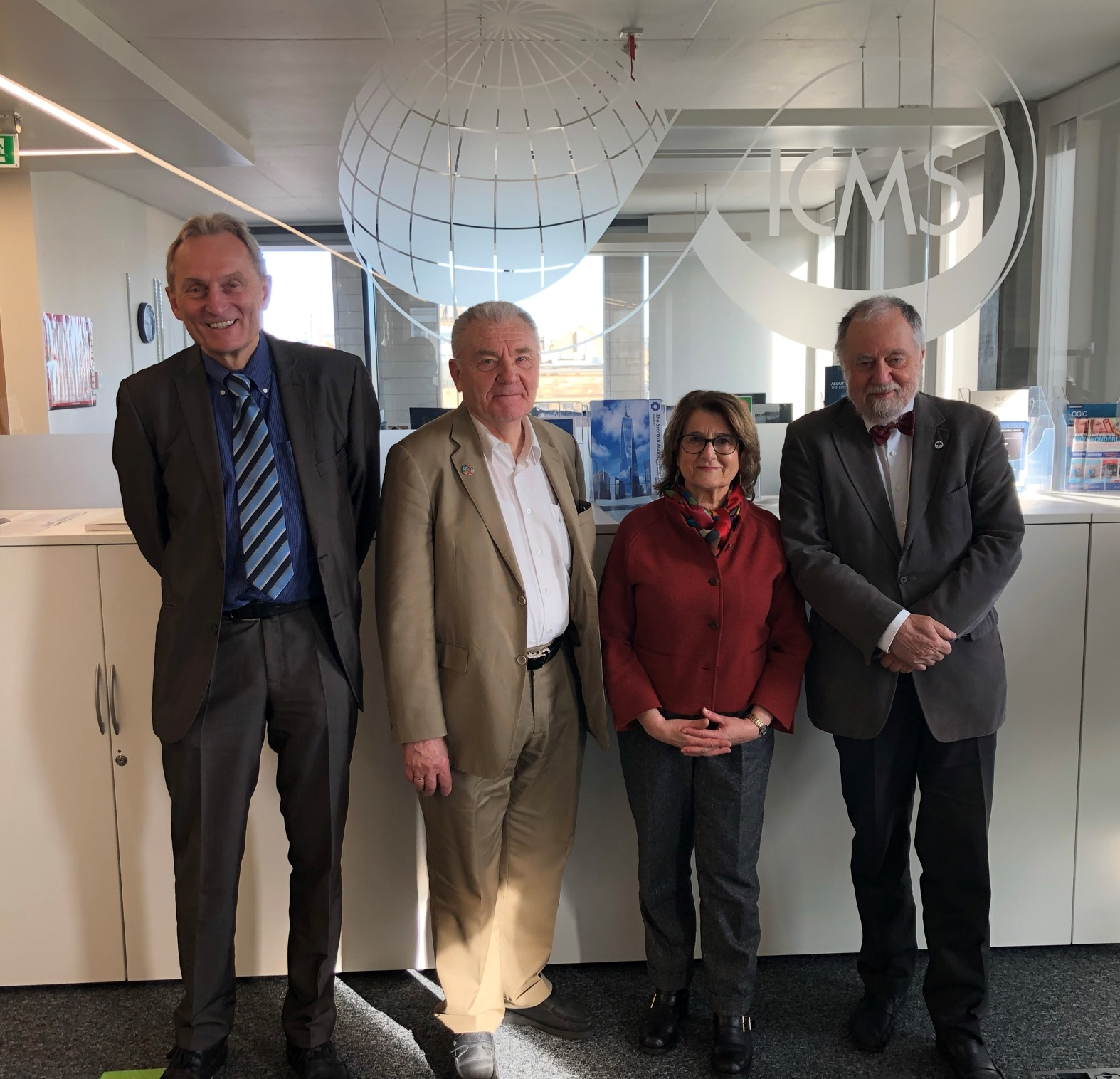
Four EMS presidents: Volker Mehrmann (2019–2023), Jean-Pierre Bourguignon (1995-1998), Marta Sanz-Solé (2011–2014), and Pavel Exner (2015–2018) at EMS 30th anniversary celebration at International Centre for Mathematical Sciences in Edinburgh

The precursor to the EMS, the European Mathematical Council was founded in 1978 at the International Congress of Mathematicians in Helsinki. This informal federation of mathematical societies was chaired by Sir Michael Atiyah. The European Mathematical Society was founded on 28 October 1990 in Mądralin near Warsaw, Poland, with Friedrich Hirzebruch as founding president. Initially, the EMS had 27 member societies. The first European Congress of Mathematics (ECM) was held at the Sorbonne and Panthéon-Sorbonne universities in Paris in 1992, and is now held every 4 years at different locations around Europe, organised by the EMS. ECM 2020 was postponed for a year due to the covid pandemic took place in 2021 in Portorož in Slovenia. The next ECM (2028) will be held in Bologna.

=== Presidents of the EMS ===
1. Friedrich Hirzebruch, 1990–1994
2. Jean-Pierre Bourguignon, 1995–1998
3. Rolf Jeltsch, 1999–2002
4. John Kingman, 2003–2006
5. Ari Laptev, 2007–2010
6. Marta Sanz-Solé, 2011–2014
7. Pavel Exner, 2015–2018
8. Volker Mehrmann, 2019–2022
9. Jan Philip Solovej, 2023–present

== Structure and governance ==
The governing body of the EMS is its council, which comprises delegates representing all of the societies which are themselves members of the EMS, along with delegates representing the institutional and individual EMS members. The council meets every two years, and appoints the president and its executive committee, who are responsible for the running of the society.

Besides the executive committee, the EMS has standing committees on: Applications and Interdisciplinary Relations, Developing Countries, Mathematical Education, ERCOM (Directors of European Research Centres in the Mathematical Sciences), Ethics, European Solidarity, Meetings, Publications and Electronic Dissemination, Raising Public Awareness of Mathematics, Women in Mathematics.

The EMS's rules are set down in its statutes and bylaws. The EMS is headquartered at the University of Helsinki.

== Prizes ==
The European Congress of Mathematics (ECM) is held every four years under the Society's auspices, at which ten EMS Prizes are awarded to "recognize excellent contributions in Mathematics by young researchers not older than 35 years".

Since 2000, the Felix Klein Prize (endowed by the Institute for Industrial Mathematics in Kaiserslautern) has been awarded to "a young scientist or a small group of young scientists (normally under the age of 38) for using sophisticated methods to give an outstanding solution, which meets with the complete satisfaction of industry, to a concrete and difficult industrial problem."

Since 2012, the Otto Neugebauer Prize (endowed by Springer Verlag) has been awarded to a researcher or group of researchers '"for highly original and influential work in the field of history of mathematics that enhances our understanding of either the development of mathematics or a particular mathematical subject in any period and in any geographical region".

Since 2024, the Simon Norton Prize for Mathematics Outreach has been awarded to individuals, teams or partnerships whose work in any area of mathematics engagement has had an outstanding and demonstrable impact or influence on its audience.

The following are the awardees so far, (a ^{F} symbol denotes mathematicians who later earned a Fields Medal).

=== 1992 prizes ===
EMS Prizes: Richard Borcherds (UK)^{F} – Jens Franke (Germany) – Alexander Goncharov (Russia) – Maxim Kontsevich (Russia)^{F} – François Labourie (France) – Tomasz Łuczak (Poland) – Stefan Müller (Germany) – Vladimír Šverák (Czechoslovakia) – Gábor Tardos (Hungary) – Claire Voisin (France)

=== 1996 prizes ===
EMS Prizes: Alexis Bonnet (France) – Timothy Gowers (UK)^{F} – Annette Huber-Klawitter (Germany) – Aise Johan de Jong (Netherlands) – Dmitry Kramkov (Russia) – Jiří Matoušek (Czech Republic) – Loïc Merel (France) – Grigori Perelman (Russia)^{F}, declined – Ricardo Pérez-Marco (Spain/France) – Leonid Polterovich (Russia/Israel)

=== 2000 prizes ===
EMS Prizes: Semyon Alesker (Israel) – Raphaël Cerf (France) – Dennis Gaitsgory (Moldova) – Emmanuel Grenier (France) – Dominic Joyce (UK) – Vincent Lafforgue (France) – Michael McQuillan (UK) – Stefan Nemirovski (Russia) – Paul Seidel (UK/Italy) – Wendelin Werner (France)^{F}

Felix Klein Prize: David C. Dobson (USA)

=== 2004 prizes ===
EMS Prizes: Franck Barthe (France) – Stefano Bianchini (Italy) – Paul Biran (Israel) – Elon Lindenstrauss (Israel)^{F} – Andrei Okounkov (Russia)^{F} – Sylvia Serfaty (France) – Stanislav Smirnov (Russia)^{F} – Xavier Tolsa (Spain) – Warwick Tucker (Australia/Sweden) – Otmar Venjakob (Germany)

Felix Klein Prize: Not Awarded

=== 2008 prizes ===
EMS Prizes: Artur Avila (Brazil)^{F} – Alexei Borodin (Russia) – Ben J. Green (UK) – Olga Holtz (Russia) – Boáz Klartag (Israel) – Alexander Kuznetsov (Russia) – Assaf Naor (USA/Israel) – Laure Saint-Raymond (France) – Agata Smoktunowicz (Poland) – Cédric Villani (France)^{F}

Felix Klein Prize: Josselin Garnier (France)

=== 2012 prizes ===
EMS Prizes: Simon Brendle (Germany) - Emmanuel Breuillard (France) - Alessio Figalli (Italy)^{F} - Adrian Ioana (Romania) - Mathieu Lewin (France) - Ciprian Manolescu (Romania) - Grégory Miermont (France) - Sophie Morel (France) - Tom Sanders (UK) - Corinna Ulcigrai (Italy) -

Felix Klein Prize: Emmanuel Trélat (France)

Otto Neugebauer Prize: Jan P. Hogendijk (Netherlands)

=== 2016 prizes ===
EMS Prizes: Sara Zahedi (Iran-Sweden) - Mark Braverman (Israel) - Vincent Calvez (France) - Guido de Philippis (Italy) - Peter Scholze (Germany)^{F} - Péter Varjú (Hungary) - Thomas Willwacher (Germany) - James Maynard (UK)^{F} - Hugo Duminil-Copin (France)^{F} - Geordie Williamson (Australia)

Felix Klein Prize: Patrice Hauret (France)

Otto Neugebauer Prize: Jeremy Gray (UK)

=== 2020 prizes ===
EMS Prizes: Karim Adiprasito (Germany) - Ana Caraiani (Romania) - Alexander Efimov (Russia) - Simion Filip (Moldova) - Aleksandr Logunov (Russia) - Kaisa Matomäki (Finland) - Phan Thành Nam (Vietnam) - Joaquim Serra (Spain) - Jack Thorne (UK) - Maryna Viazovska (Ukraine)^{F}

Felix Klein Prize: Arnulf Jentzen (Germany)

Otto Neugebauer Prize: Karine Chemla (France)

=== 2024 prizes ===
EMS Prizes: Maria Colombo (Italy/Switzerland) - Cristiana De Filippis (Italy) - Jessica Fintzen (Germany) - Nina Holden (Norway/USA) - Tom Hutchcroft (UK/USA) - Jacek Jendrej (Poland/France) - Adam Kanigowski (Poland/USA) - Frederick Manners (UK/USA) - Richard Montgomery (UK) - Danylo Radchenko (Ukraine/France)

Felix Klein Prize: Fabien Casenave (France)

Otto Neugebauer Prize: Reinhard Siegmund-Schultze (Germany/Norway)

Paul Lévy Prize in Probability Theory: Jeremy Quastel (Canada)

Simon Norton Prize: Nina Gasking (Maison des Mathématiques et de l'Informatique, France)

== National societies holding full membership in EMS ==
- Armenian Mathematical Union
- Austrian Mathematical Society
- Belgian Mathematical Society
- Belgian Statistical Society
- Bosnian Mathematical Society
- Union of Bulgarian Mathematicians
- Croatian Mathematical Society
- Cyprus Mathematical Society
- Czech Mathematical Society
- Danish Mathematical Society
- Edinburgh Mathematical Society
- Estonian Mathematical Society
- Finnish Mathematical Society
- Société Mathématique de France
- Society of Applied & Industrial Mathematicians (GAMM)
- Georgian Mathematical Union
- German Mathematical Society
- Hellenic Mathematical Society
- Icelandic Mathematical Society
- Institute of Mathematics and its Applications
- Irish Mathematical Society
- Israel Mathematical Union
- Italian Association of Mathematics Applied to Economic and Social Sciences (AMASES)
- Società Italiana di Matematica Applicata e Industriale (SIMAI)
- Italian Mathematical Union
- János Bolyai Mathematical Society
- Kosovar Mathematical Society
- Latvian Mathematical Society
- Lithuanian Mathematical Society
- London Mathematical Society
- Luxembourg Mathematical Society
- Moscow Mathematical Society
- Norwegian Mathematical Society
- Norwegian Statistical Association
- Polish Mathematical Society
- Portuguese Mathematical Society
- Real Sociedad Matemática Española (Royal Spanish Math. Society)
- Romanian Mathematical Society
- Royal Dutch Mathematical Society
- Slovak Mathematical Society
- Slovenian Discrete and Applied Mathematics Society
- Société de Mathématiques Appliquées et Industrielles (SMAI)
- Sociedad Española de Matemática Aplicada (Spanish Soc. of Appl. Math.)
- Societat Catalana de Matemàtiques (Catalan Society of Mathematics)
- Society of Mathematicians and Physicists of Montenegro
- Spanish Society of Statistics and Operations Research
- St. Petersburg Mathematical Society
- Svenska Matematikersamfundet (Swedish Mathematical Society)
- Swiss Mathematical Society
- Society of Mathematicians, Physicists and Astronomers of Slovenia
- Turkish Mathematical Society
- Ukrainian Mathematical Society

== Publications ==
The EMS is the sole shareholder of the publisher EMS Press that publishes over 25 academic journals, including:

- Algebraic Geometry
- Annales de l'Institut Henri Poincaré C
- Annales de l'Institut Henri Poincaré D
- Commentarii Mathematici Helvetici
- Documenta Mathematica
- Elemente der Mathematik
- EMS Surveys in Mathematical Sciences
- Groups, Geometry, and Dynamics
- Interfaces and Free Boundaries
- Journal of Combinatorial Algebra
- Journal of Fractal Geometry
- Journal of Noncommutative Geometry
- Journal of Spectral Theory
- Journal of the European Mathematical Society
- L’Enseignement Mathématique
- Mathematical Statistics and Learning
- Memoirs of the European Mathematical Society
- Oberwolfach Reports
- Portugaliae Mathematica
- Publications of the Research Institute for Mathematical Sciences
- Quantum Topology
- Rendiconti del Seminario Matematico della Università di Padova
- Rendiconti Lincei - Matematica e Applicazioni
- Revista Matemática Iberoamericana
- Zeitschrift für Analysis und ihre Anwendungen

EMS Press has also published over 200 books in mathematics since 2003, in both print and digital formats.

In addition, since 2021 it publishes the Magazine of the European Mathematical Society, often called EMS Magazine (ISSN 2747-7894, eISSN 2747-7908), formerly known as the Newsletter of the European Mathematical Society (ISSN 1027-488X), which was established in 1991. It features news and expositions of recent developments in mathematical research. It is quarterly and open access. The current editor-in-chief is Donatella Donatelli (succeeding Fernando da Costa). The Encyclopedia of Mathematics is also sponsored by the EMS.

== See also ==
- List of mathematical societies
