= UBM (disambiguation) =

UBM may refer to:

- UBM plc, a British business-to-business events organiser
- UBM Technology Group, a business-to-business multimedia company
- Ultrasound biomicroscopy, a type of ultrasound eye exam
- University of Bunda Mulia, one of the major Indonesian private universities
- ubm, the ISO 639 code for Mainstream Kenyah language
- Unsolicited bulk mail, an older technical term for email spam
- The Union of Bulgarian Mathematicians
