= Gabon Mathematical Society =

The Gabon Mathematical Society (in French: Société Mathématique du Gabon, SMG) is a learned society of the mathematicians from Gabon, recognized by the International Mathematical Union as the national mathematical organization for its country. It was founded in 2013 and its current president is Philibert Nang, from the École Normale Supérieure, Libreville.
