= Groups, Geometry, and Dynamics =

- Discipline: Groups, geometry, dynamical systems
- Language: English
- Edited by: Rostislav Grigorchuk

Publication details
- History: 2007–present
- Publisher: European Mathematical Society
- Frequency: Quarterly
- Impact factor: 0.867 (2012)

Standard abbreviations
- ISO 4: Groups Geom. Dyn.

Indexing
- ISSN: 1661-7207 (print); 1661-7215 (web)
- OCLC no.: 649254692

Links
- Journal homepage; Online access

Groups, Geometry, and Dynamics is a quarterly peer-reviewed mathematics journal published quarterly by the European Mathematical Society. It was established in 2007 and covers all aspects of groups, group actions, geometry and dynamical systems. The journal is indexed by Mathematical Reviews and Zentralblatt MATH. Its 2009 MCQ was 0.65, and its 2012 impact factor is 0.867.
