= Documenta Mathematica =

- Discipline: Mathematics
- Language: Multiple
- Edited by: Henning Krause, Stefan Teufel, Otmar Venjakob

Publication details
- History: 1996–present
- Publisher: EMS Press (Germany)
- Frequency: Bimonthly
- Open access: Yes
- License: CC BY 4.0
- Impact factor: 1.2 (2019)

Standard abbreviations
- ISO 4: Doc. Math.

Indexing
- ISSN: 1431-0635 (print); 1431-0643 (web)

Links
- Journal homepage; Online archive

Documenta Mathematica is a peer-reviewed multidisciplinary mathematical journal by the German Mathematical Society published since 1996. The journal doesn't charge a publishing fee from authors, and all publications are available online free-of-charge as PDF files, making it completely open-access to both authors and readers. Since September 2017, articles are published under the Creative Commons CC BY 4.0 license.

The current editorial board includes Henning Krause, Stefan Teufel and Otmar Venjakob. Since 1996 until 2017, Documenta Mathematica had been being published by Bielefeld University, since 2018 until 2022 by FIZ Karlsruhe, and at present by EMS Press. It's published as one 6-issue volume annually with approximately 60 articles vetted by reviewers. The publication related to the journal is the Documenta Mathematica Series (formerly known as Documenta Mathematica Extra Volumes), a book series which publishes edited volumes and monographs.

== Abstracting and indexing ==
The journal is indexed and abstracted in the following bibliographic databases:

- DOAJ
- Mathematical Reviews
- Scopus
- Science Citation Index Expanded
- zbMATH Open

Both JUFO considers the journal to be a Level 2 journal, considered 'leading' in its field. Likewise, the Norwegian Scientific Index considers the journal to be a Level 2 journal, its highest rating reserved for the top 20% of journals.
