= Mujahid Kamran =

Pakistani vice-chancellor of a university

- Born: 23 January 1951 (age 75); Gujrat, West Pakistan, Dominion of Pakistan
- Citizenship: Pakistan
- Education: University of Edinburgh; University of the Punjab
- Awards: National Book Foundation Award (2000); Pride of Performance Award by the president of Pakistan (1999); Abdus Salam Award (1985)
- Scientific career
- Fields: Theoretical physics
- Workplaces: University of the Punjab (PU); International Center for Theoretical Physics (ICTP); King Saud University (KSU)
- Doctoral advisor: L.L.J. Vick

Syed Mujahid Kamran (born 23 January 1951) is a Pakistani theoretical physicist and a former vice-chancellor of the University of the Punjab in Lahore, Pakistan.

He is a professor of physics and previously served as the chairman of the Physics Department at the University of the Punjab (1995–2001) and (January 2007 – January 2008). From 2004 to 2007, he served as the dean of the Faculty of Sciences at the same institution. In January 2008, he was appointed vice-chancellor of the Punjab University by the governor of Punjab, Khalid Maqbool.

Kamran joined the University of the Punjab as a lecturer in 1972 and became an assistant professor in 1982, associate professor in 1986, and professor in 1988. He is a former Fulbright Fellow at the University of Georgia from 1988–89.

== Early life and education ==
Kamran was born on 23 January 1951, in Gujrat, Pakistan. In his early youth, he moved to Rawalpindi, where his father, Syed Shabbir Hussain, took a position as a political correspondent for the Pakistan Times. From 1955 to 1969 he studied at the educational institutions of Rawalpindi. In 1965, Kamran did his matriculation from Sir Syed High School, standing first in the class. Kamran later did his F.Sc. in 1967 and BSc in 1969 from Gordon College, Rawalpindi.

He attended the University of the Punjab and earned an MSc in physics in 1971, specialising in theoretical particle physics. He won merit scholarships during the periods 1965–1967, 1967–1969, 1969–1971. He was awarded a doctoral scholarship by the Government of Pakistan under the Central Overseas Training Scholarship Scheme and travelled to Great Britain to attend the University of Edinburgh in 1975. There, he received a PhD in theoretical physics in 1979. His doctoral thesis was titled "The Dual Absorptive Model and Elastic Hadronic Scattering at High Energies and Small Momentum Transfers" and was supervised by Dr. L.L.J. Vick.

== Academic career ==
After completing his PhD, Kamran returned to Pakistan in 1979, and joined his alma mater as lecturer in physics. He has been teaching postgraduate (MSc and M.Phil) and undergraduate (BSc Hons) classes at Punjab University (PU). He has also taught PhD, MSc and BSc courses at King Saud University (KSU) in Riyadh, Saudi Arabia, where he was an associate professor from 2001 to 2004. KSU has an American system with a BSc awarded after 16 years, and MSc after 18 years of education. Courses he taught at PhD and MSc level at KSU were: Physics of Elementary Particles, Quantum Field Theory I and II, Gauge Theories, Mathematical Physics, and Quantum Mechanics II. He also taught Quantum Mechanics at the BSc final year level.

After becoming the chairman of the Physics Department in May 1995, he initiated a program of grooming talented students (through extra lectures and coaching) so that they could win foreign scholarships. Owing to his efforts, PU physics students have won about 40 fellowships (worth about 3 million dollars) since 1999. This program was initiated well before GOP/HEC launched its manpower training programs. Not a single penny of the GOP/HEC has been spent in this regard as these scholarships are funded by Western institutions. Prof. T. Bolton of KSU referred to him as "a goldmine of graduate students". He was conferred with the Pride of Performance award in 1998. In 2008, he was appointed vice-chancellor of the University of the Punjab. He also published a brief book on the life of Albert Einstein, titled Einstein and Germany.

== 9/11 claims ==
In 2013, Kamran published a book entitled 9/11 and the New World Order. In this book, he has tried to substantiate some of the popular 9/11 conspiracy theories. In an article on 24 September 2012, he wrote that "currently 95% of the US media is owned by only six corporations, whose top echelons are dominated by Zionists allied with the banking cabal. With the US military and intelligence apparatus in their control, with their ownership of the media, and with their control of academia, it is easy for them to direct assassinations and false flag operations, such as the murder of JFK and 9/11."

On 11 September 2013, while taking part in a talk show on the Pakistani 24-hour news channel Din News, he supported the 9/11 conspiracy theories. He blamed the international bankers for all the ills in the world. He also criticised the US think tanks such as the Council on Foreign Relations for pushing the US into wars.

== Personal life ==
As a young student, Kamran was a keen field hockey player and a science debater. He was a member of the Gordon College hockey team (1967–1969) as well as the Punjab University hockey team (1969–1971). He was captain of the PU hockey team between 1970 and 1971. He was a member of the Gordon College House of Commons Debating Club from 1965 to 1969 and was president of the Punjab University Physics Association from 1970 to 1971.

Kamran is the son of veteran journalist, scholar and former bureau chief of The Pakistan Times, Islamabad, Syed Shabbir Hussain. He has three brothers and two sisters.

== Awards ==
- Pride of Performance Award by the president of Pakistan (1999)
- Abdus Salam Award in Physics (1985)
- National Book Foundation Award (1997)

== Bibliography ==
=== Research publications ===
Research publications by Kamran can be found at the following link, organised by INSPIRE-HEP:

- http://inspirehep.net/search?p=FIND+AUTHOR+MUJAHID+KAMRAN

=== Books ===
Science

- Jadeed Tabiyat kay Mashaheer, Lahore : Punjab University, 1988, 203 pages
- S. Shabbir Hussain and M. Kamran: (Editors) Dr. A.Q. Khan on Science and Education, Lahore : Sang-e-Meel Publications 1997, 269 p., ISBN 969-35-0821-1, ISBN 978-969-35-0821-5
- Jadeed Tabiyat kay Bani (Founders of Modern Physics), Lahore : Sang-e-Meel Publications, 1997, 313 p., ISBN 969-35-0809-2; winner of the National Book Foundation Award, reprinted 2009
- Editor: Dr. A.Q. Khan on Science, Education and Technology, Lahore : Sang-e-Meel Publications, 2004, 500 p.
- Relativistic Quantum Mechanics – A Quick Introduction, Lahore : Sang-e-Meel Publications, 2005, 119 p., ISBN 969-35-1783-0 (for final-year undergraduate and first-year graduate students of US universities and M.Sc. and MPhil students of Pakistani universities)
- Einstein and Germany, Lahore : Sang-e-Meel Publications, 2009, 222 p., ISBN 978-969-35-2234-1
- The Inspiring Life of Abdus Salam, Lahore : Punjab University, 2013, 329 p.
- Relativistic Quantum Mechanics: An Easy Introduction, Lahore : Punjab University, 2014, 277 p.

Politics

- Pase-e-Parda – aalmi siasat key makhfi haqaiq: (Behind the Curtain – Hidden Facts of Global Politics), Lahore : Sang-e-Meel Publications, 2008, 190 p., ISBN 969-35-2174-9
- The Grand Deception – Corporate America and Perpetual War, Lahore : Sang-e-Meel Publications, 2011, 326 p. Translation of Pase-e-Parda.
- 9/11 & the New World Order, Lahore : University of the Punjab, 2013, 384 p.
- The International Bankers, World Wars I, II, and Beyond, Lahore : Punjab University, 2015, 545 p.
- The World Order: How it Works, Lahore : Sang-e-Meel Publications, 2019, 608 p.

=== Editorial publications ===
- "End of the United States as a Democracy" in The Nation, 12 October 2010
- "The Decay of US Courts" in The Nation, 28 September 2010
- "Drugs, US Corporations and CIA" in The Nation (newspaper), 19 October 2010
- "Canadian sovereignty?" in The Nation (newspaper), 2 November 2010
- "Abdus Salam at Cambridge" in The Nation (newspaper), 21 November 2010
