= Czech Mathematical Society =

Professional association in the Czech Republic

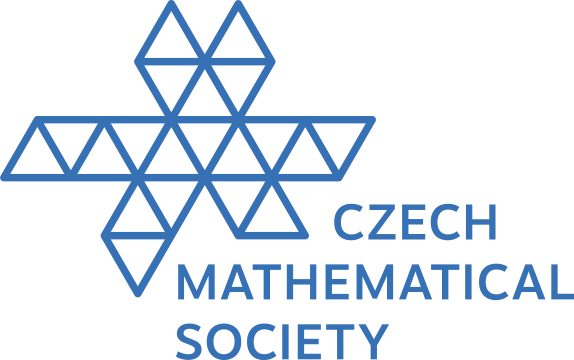
- Abbreviation: CMS
- Formation: 1972; 54 years ago
- Headquarters: Prague, Czech Republic
- Fields: Mathematics
- Members: More than 400 members
- President: Luboš Pick
- Affiliations: European Mathematical Society
- Website: http://jcmf.cz/?q=en/frontpagecms

The Czech Mathematical Society (Czech: Česká matematická společnost, CMS) is an association of researchers, teachers, professionals and other persons interested in mathematics. Formally, the CMS is one of the four sections (subsidiary associations) of the Union of Czech Mathematicians and Physicists (JČMF). Membership in the CMS is therefore conditional on membership in JČMF.

It was founded in 1972 originally under the name Mathematical Research Section. In 2004 it was renamed to its current name.

The CMS is managed by a twelve-member Executive Committee, which is elected by the members of the society. The Executive Committee elects the President of the CMS from among its members. The current President (2022–2026) is Luboš Pick.

The CMS is a member of the European Mathematical Society and associate member of the International Council for Industrial and Applied Mathematics (ICIAM). The Union of Czech Mathematicians and Physicists is the Adhering Organization through which the Czech Republic adheres to the International Mathematical Union (IMU). The Czech Republic's membership in the IMU is represented by the Czech Committee for Mathematics.

== Activities ==
The Czech Mathematical Society organizes a number of activities, in particular:

- Organizing an annual competition for university students in scientific activity in mathematics and informatics, in cooperation with the Slovak Mathematical Society.
- Supporting a number of events for pupils and high-school students with the aim of popularizing mathematics and improving mathematics education.
- Organizing the quadrennial Conference of Czech Mathematicians and participating together with other organizations and institutions in organizing other scientific events.
- Organizing public lectures popularizing mathematics.
- Awarding the Honorary Medal for Mathematics to Czech and Slovak specialists for their important contributions to development of the fields of mathematics and didactics of mathematics in the Czech Republic, and to eminent foreign specialists in the fields of mathematics and didactics of mathematics who have had long-term collaboration with institutions in the Czech Republic.
- Awarding the Czech Mathematical Society Prize for Young Researchers.
