= Jean-Paul Pier =

Luxembourgish mathematician

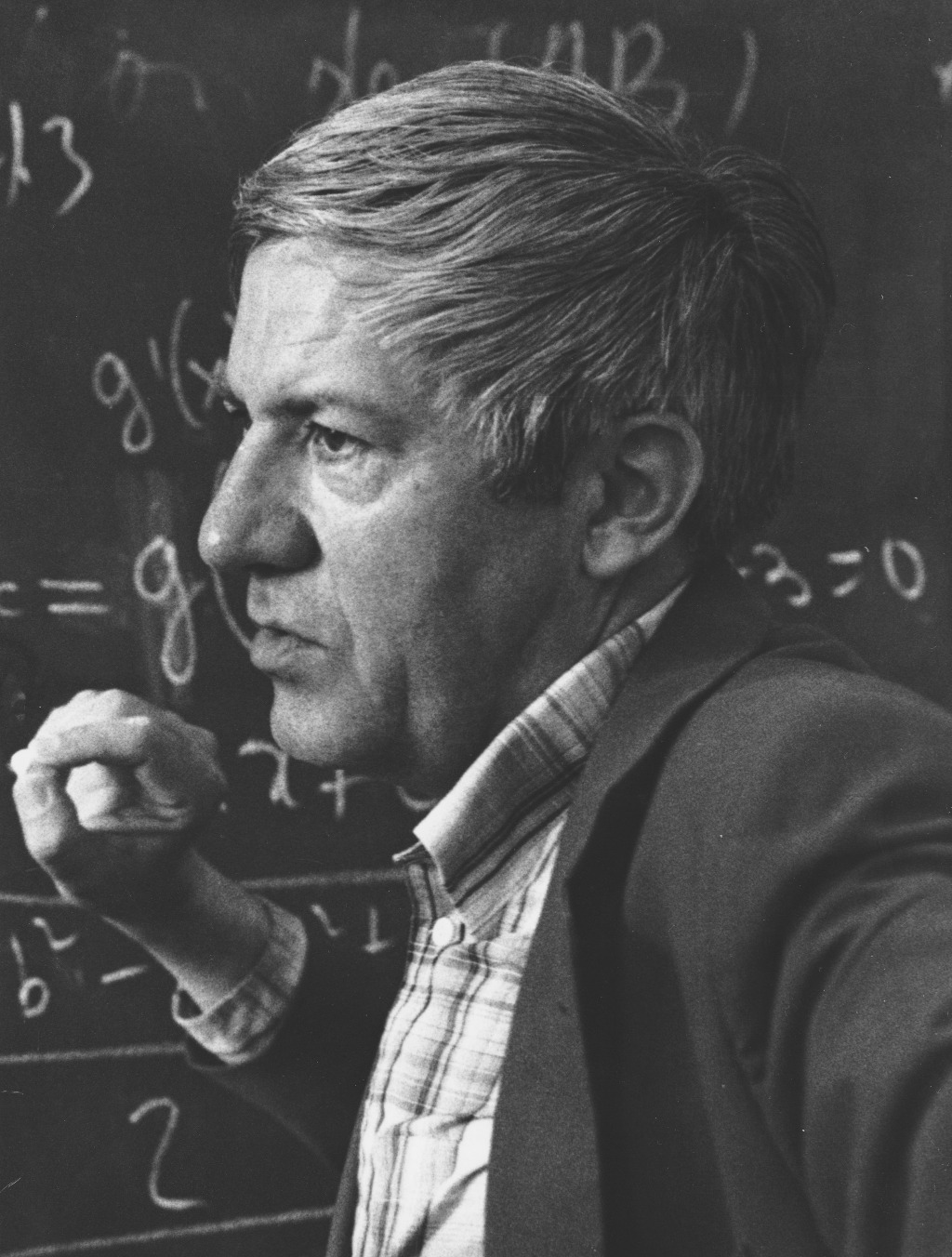
- Jean-Paul Pier at the Centre universitaire de Luxembourg in 1980
- Born: Jean-Paul Pier; July 5, 1933; Esch-sur-Alzette, Luxembourg
- Died: December 14, 2016 (aged 83); Bettembourg, Luxembourg
- Awards: Grand prix en sciences mathématiques de l'Institut grand-ducal (2011)
- Scientific career
- Workplaces: Centre universitaire de Luxembourg, precursor to the Université du Luxembourg; Université catholique de Louvain

Jean-Paul Pier (July 5, 1933 – December 14, 2016) was a Luxembourgish mathematician, specializing in harmonic analysis and the history of mathematics, particularly mathematical analysis in the 20th century.

== Education and career ==
Jean-Paul Pier was a graduate student in Luxembourg and at the universities of Paris and Nancy. He earned a University of Luxembourg doctorate in mathematical sciences and a French doctorate in pure mathematics. He also spent six months at the Grenoble Nuclear Research Center (1961) and a year at the University of Oregon (1966-1967).

He taught mathematics at the Lycée de Garçons in Esch-sur-Alzette from 1956 to 1980. In 1971 he created the Séminaire de mathématiques at the Centre universitaire de Luxembourg (now the University of Luxembourg). He was a professor at the Centre from its creation in 1974 until 1998, when he retired as professor emeritus.

Pier was primarily responsible for the creation in January 1989 of the Luxembourg Mathematical Society, of which he was president from 1989 to 1993 and again from 1995 to 1998. He was during the academic year 1994–1995 a visiting professor at the Université catholique de Louvain.

Pier was the editor of two scholarly anthologies, which are standard works on the history of 20th-century mathematics. He organized several colloquia and conferences in Luxembourg. He was active internationally in various scientific bodies, including NATO Science for Peace and Security and UNESCO.

== Selected publications ==
- Amenable locally compact groups, Wiley, 1984.
- Amenable Banach algebras, Longman, 1988.
- L'Analyse harmonique. Son développement historique, Masson, 1990.
- Histoire de l'intégration, vingt-cinq siècles de mathématiques, Masson, 1996.
- Mathematical Analysis during the 20th century, Oxford University Press, 2001
- Mathématiques entre savoir et connaissance, Vuibert, 2006.
- Development of Mathematics 1900-1950, edited by Jean-Paul Pier, Birkhäuser, 1994.
- Development of Mathematics 1950-2000, edited by Jean-Paul Pier, Birkhäuser, 2000.
- Gabriel Lippmann. Commémoration par la section des sciences naturelles, physiques et mathématiques de l’Institut grand-ducal de Luxembourg du 150^{e} anniversaire du savant né au Luxembourg lauréat du prix Nobel en 1908, J.-P. Pier et J. A. Massard, éditeurs, 1997.
- Le Choix de la parole, Lethielleux/DDB, 2009.
