= Malta Mathematical Society =

Mathematical society based in Malta

- Is-Soċjetà Maltija tal-Matematika
- The society logo depicts the graph of the Bridges of Königsberg problem in the style of a traditional Maltese Luzzu
- Formation: 2019; 7 years ago
- Founders: Luke Collins; Prof. Joseph Muscat; Xandru Mifsud; Jake Xuereb
- Type: Voluntary Organisation
- Headquarters: Msida, Malta
- Official language: English, Maltese
- President: Maria Aquilina
- Peer(s): Prof. Joseph Muscat

The Malta Mathematical Society (MMS) is a mathematical society based in Malta, whose aim is to increase the awareness and popularity of mathematics among the Maltese populace. It organises lectures and various events open to the general public.

== History ==
=== The First Malta Mathematical Society ===
A society of the same name was established in 1998 by Prof. Joseph Muscat at the Department of Mathematics of the University of Malta. The first activity organised was a talk delivered by Ms Cettina Gauci Pulo, at the time an assistant lecturer at the University of Malta Junior College, and was entitled "Discovering Fractals". Its first general meeting was held on January 5, 1999, and its first executive committee was composed of the following members: Prof. Joseph Muscat (President), Audrienne Cutajar Bezzina, Cettina Gauci Pulo, Dr. James L. Borg and Jill Kirkstadt. The society was responsible for the foundation of the Malta Mathematics Olympiad, which nowadays is in its 11th edition and is independent from the society.

=== Reinstatement of the Society ===
After around a decade of inactivity, Luke Collins happened to learn about the society from an archived version of the mathematics department's website, and became interested in getting it started again. He approached Prof. Joseph Muscat (founder of the first society), together with fellow students Jake Xuereb and Xandru Mifsud, and together they started organising events for the general public. During the COVID-19 pandemic, the Society grew a significant online following, since most of its events were held over videoconferencing. One of the most popular events during this time was a debate titled "Is Mathematics invented, or discovered?".

In summer 2021, a short introductory course on differential geometry was held, among other leisurely activities such as a pub quiz. In November 2021, a debate titled "Debate: Is Mathematics an Art or a Science?" was organised with guest panellists from different Faculties of the University of Malta. This was the last event held before the first Annual General Meeting (AGM).

== Membership ==
Membership is open to anyone who is interested in mathematics. Members receive discounts when attending paid events organised by the Society, access to exclusive events, as well as the right to vote in meetings of the Society. Peers of the Society are distinguished members who are honoured by the Society for notable academic achievements in a mathematical discipline, being held in high regard by the Society, or for making meaningful or long-standing contributions to the Society.

== Activities ==
=== Lectures and Lecture Series ===
Every year, the Society organises several public lectures catering to a variety of audiences. Some lectures are popular mathematics lecturers aimed towards the general public, other lectures are aimed at sixth formers, undergraduate or even graduate students of mathematics. In addition to one-off lectures, the Society organises one or two lecture series every year. Some of these have included:

- Introduction to Differential Geometry, six lectures by Prof. Joseph Muscat (Summer, 2021)
- Analytic Number Theory and its Applications, three lectures by Luke Collins (Summer, 2022)
- Mathematics in Ongoing Physics Research, five lectures in collaboration with the Department of Physics at the University of Malta (Winter, 2022)

The Society organises also organises interdisciplinary talks, such as "Ancient Greek Mathematics" a talk given by Andrew Debono Cauchi in collaboration with the Malta Classics Association.

==== Other Talks and Debates ====
Generally, the Society organises a Christmas themed talk in December, often with a guest lecturer from the Department of Mathematics at the University of Malta. It has also organised well-attended debates, such as "Is mathematics invented or discovered".

To encourage the active participation of undergraduates, the Society occasionally organises Quickfire talks, which are events where short talks are presented and discussed in an informal environment.

Recordings of some of the lectures, lecture series and debates can be found on the Society's Youtube channel.

=== Informal and Leisurely Activities ===
In addition to academic lectures and talks, the Society organises various social events such as maths-themed Pub Quizzes, Bake sales for Pi Day, and occasional lunches.

== Executive Committees ==
In December 2023, an AGM was held, at which the Society's Executive Committee for 2024 was elected. The members of the executive were elected as follows:

- President: Maria Aquilina
- Secretary: Giorgio Grigolo
- Treasurer: Luke Collins
- Social Media and Marketing Officer: Jamie Garzia
- Events Officer: Alex Cordina
- Executive Member(s): Dimitar Petrov

The election was held as outlined by the statute of the MMS, and the next election will be held on the 17th of December, 2024.

List of the Malta Mathematical Society's Executive Committees

Year	Picture	President	Other Members
1999		Prof. Joseph Muscat	Audrienne Cutajar Bezzina; Dr. James L. Borg; Cettina Gauci Pulo; Jill Kirkstadt
(inactivity)
2019–20			Luke Collins; Xandru Mifsud; Jake Xuereb; Dylan Zammit
2021			Adriana Baldacchino; Luke Collins; Jonathan Farrugia; Ethan James German; Giorgio Grigolo; Xandru Mifsud; Juan Scerri; Jake Xuereb
2022	From left to right: Luke Collins, Marietta Galea, Ethan James German (President), Maria Aquilina, Giorgio Grigolo	Ethan James German (position re-established)	Giorgio Grigolo (Secretary); Luke Collins (Treasurer); Marietta Galea (Social Media and Marketing Officer); Maria Aquilina (Events Officer)
2023		Maria Aquilina	Giorgio Grigolo (Secretary); Luke Collins (Treasurer); Marietta Galea (Social Media and Marketing Officer); Alex Cordina (Events Officer)
2024	Front, from left to right: Luke Collins, Maria Aquilina (President), Giorgio Grigolo, Marietta Galea. Back, from left to right: Jamie Garzia, Alex Cordina, Dimitar Petrov	Maria Aquilina	Giorgio Grigolo (Secretary); Luke Collins (Treasurer); Jamie Garzia (Social Media and Marketing Officer); Alex Cordina (Events Officer); Dimitar Petrov (Executive Member)

== See also ==
- Malta Mathematical Society Official Website
- University of Malta
- London Mathematical Society
- American Mathematical Society
- List of mathematical societies
