= Stefan Nemirovski =

Russian mathematician

- Born: 29 July 1973 (age 53)
- Education: Moscow State University
- Awards: EMS Prize (2000)
- Scientific career
- Fields: Mathematics
- Workplaces: University of Bochum, Steklov Institute of Mathematics

Stefan Yuryevich Nemirovski (Russian: Стефан Юрьевич Немировский; born 29 July 1973) is a Russian mathematician. He made notable contributions to topology and complex analysis, and was awarded an EMS Prize in 2000.

Nemirovski earned his Ph.D. from Moscow State University in 1998.
