= Emmanuel Grenier =

French mathematician (born 1970)

- Born: 3 November 1970 (age 55); Château-Thierry, Aisne
- Education: Pierre and Marie Curie University
- Awards: EMS Prize (2000)
- Scientific career
- Fields: Mathematics
- Workplaces: École Normale Supérieure de Lyon; École polytechnique
- Doctoral advisor: Yann Brenier

Emmanuel Grenier (born 3 November 1970) is a French mathematician. His research interests include hydrodynamics (e.g. Navier–Stokes equations, Euler equations) and mathematical biology.

Grenier attended École Normale Supérieure from 1990 to 1994, before attaining his doctorate at Pierre and Marie Curie University, under supervision of Yann Brenier. He won an EMS Prize in 2000.
