= David Clark Dobson =

American mathematician

David Clark Dobson (born 17 November 1962 in Salt Lake City) is an American mathematician.

Dobson received in 1986 his bachelor's degree from Utah State University and his PhD in 1990 from Rice University. He was at the University of Minnesota from 1990 to 1993. He was from 1993 to 1996 an assistant professor, from 1996 to 2000 an assistant Professor and from 1996 to 2000 an associate professor at Texas A&M University. Since 2002 he is a full professor at the University of Utah.

Dobson does research on applied mathematics, specifically, "computational methods and optimal design for plasmonic structures and metamaterials, optimal design of photonic structures and devices, data analysis with physical constraints, and inverse problems in acoustics."

In 2000 he received the first Felix Klein Prize. From 1997 to 1999 he was a Sloan Fellow.
