= Abdus Salam Award =

Pakistani science award

- Location: Islamabad
- Country: Pakistan
- Presented by: ICTP Chapter Pakistan
- First award: 1981
- Final award: 2013

The Abdus Salam Award (sometimes called the Salam Prize), is a most prestigious award that is awarded annually to Pakistani nationals to the field of chemistry, mathematics, physics, biology.

== Recipients ==
- 1981: Dr. Nazma Ikram (Maiden name: Dr. Nazma Masud) – (Physics)
- No award was given by Abdus Salam in 1982. According to him none of the nominations came close to the 1981 award winner Dr. Nazma Ikram.
- 1984: Dr. Pervaiz Amirali Hoodbhoy – (Mathematics)
- 1985: Dr. Mujahid Kamran - (Physics)
- 1985: Dr. Mujaddid Ahmed Ijaz – (Physics)
- 1986: Dr. Muhammad Suhail Zubairy – (Physics)
- 1986: Dr. Bina S. Siddiqui – (Chemistry)
- 1987: Dr. Qaiser Mushtaq – (Mathematics)
- 1990: Dr. M. Iqbal Choudhry– (Chemistry)
- 1991: Dr. Ashfaque H. Bokhari – (Mathematics)
- 1994: Dr. Anwar-ul Hassan Gilani – (Biology)
- 1997: Dr. Asghar Qadir - (Mathematics)
- 1998: Dr. Naseer Shahzad – (Mathematics)
- 1999: Dr. Tasawar Hayat – (Mathematics)
- 2000: Dr. Rabia Hussain – (Biology)
- 2001: Dr. Farhan Saif – (Physics)
- 2002: Dr. Muhammad Arif Malik - (Chemistry)
- 2003: Dr. Ghulam Shabbir - (Mathematics)
- 2009: Dr. Naseer-Ud-Din Shams – (Physics)
- 2009: Dr. Tayyab Kamran – (Mathematics)
- 2010: Dr. Muhammad Tahir - (Biology), ASAB, National University of Sciences and Technology, Islamabad
- 2012: Dr. Amer Iqbal — (Physics)
- 2012: Dr. Hafiz Zia-ur-Rehman - (Chemistry), Department of Chemistry, Quaid-i-Azam University, Islamabad.
- 2013: Dr. Rahim Umar - (Mathematics), Faculty of Engineering Sciences, Ghulam Ishaq Khan Institute of Engineering Sciences and Technology.

== See also ==
- List of biology awards
- List of chemistry awards
- List of mathematics awards
- List of physics awards
