= Pakistan Academy of Sciences =

Learned society established in 1953

- Pakistan Academy of Sciences
- Formation: 16 February 1953; 73 years ago
- Headquarters: Islamabad, Pakistan
- President: Kauser Abdullah Malik
- Affiliations: Royal Society
- Website: www.paspk.org

The Pakistan Academy of Sciences (Urdu: پاکستان اکادمی برائے علم) (abbreviated as: PAS) is a learned society of sciences, which described itself as "a repository of the highest scientific talent available in the country."

Established in 1953 in Lahore, Punjab, the academy acts as a consultative forum and scientific advisor to the Pakistan government on important aspects of all forms of science– the social and physical sciences. Regulating affairs by its Charter and laws approved by the fellows, the academy is governed by a council that is chaired by its President.

The fellowship of the academy is extremely restricted, going only to scholars based on the merit of their contributions to the advancement of scientific knowledge.

== History ==
The idea of establishing the academy was mooted in November 1947 when the first national education conference was organized by the Ministry of Education in Karachi, which was inaugurated Muhammad Ali Jinnah, the Governor-General of Pakistan. No immediate actions were taken at that time, though the discussion to establish the academy continues between the senior scientists and the Pakistan government. After an extensive discussion took in 1948–53, the academy was established and materialized in a concession reached by the senior scientists and government, with the assistance from the foreign scientists and the foreign learned societies.

Many scholars and scientists emigrated from India to Pakistan in the 1950s that would give foundation to the academy, including Salimuzzaman Siddiqui, Nazir Ahmed, and Raziuddin Siddiqui. Eventually, a draft was written by Raziuddin Siddiqui and approved by the council in 1950. After considerable planning and deliberations, the inauguration of the academy was fixed, and it was established on 16 February 1953 by Prime Minister Khawaja Nazimuddin who was the chief guest at the inauguration. The ceremony took place at the University of the Punjab and was witnessed by a gathering of over 1,000 scientists, including from the Royal Society (United Kingdom), National Academy of Sciences (India), Academy of Science and Letters (Norway), National Academy of Sciences (United States), Academy of Sciences (Iran), and UNESCO. Dr. Nazir Ahmed delivered an honorary message to Prime Minister Nazimuddin for helping the cause of the academy. At first, the academy was sited in Lahore and considerations were made to establish the headquarters of the academy in Karachi—a temporary federal capital at that time. An additional office was established in Dhaka to support scientific activities in East Pakistan.

In 1965, the academy's headquarters were permanently moved to Islamabad, the federal capital, where they remained near Quaid-e-Azam University until 1976. In 1976, the headquarters was shifted to a rented building in Islamabad, with financial assistance from the Pakistan Science Foundation (PSF). The rented building housed the academy’s library, a committee room, offices for the Secretary, the editor, and staff, along with a few guest rooms for visiting fellows. Special initiatives taken by senior scientists in 1978, President Zia-ul-Haq granted a federal land for the purpose of academy's headquarters near the Constitution Avenue by allocating ₨. 700 million which commissioned CDA Engineering for designing and constructing the headquarters. In 1979, the headquarters of the academy was inaugurated.

== Fellowships ==
The Fellowship of the Pakistan Academy of Sciences is dominated by the physical sciences, and has 132 fellows as of 2020. Due to its importance, the Fellowships of the Pakistan Academy of Sciences are tightly restricted to the scientists who met the criteria of their qualifications. Only scientists of the highest merit, who have made outstanding contributions to the advancement of scientific knowledge, are elected as Fellows of the academy.

Not more than five fellows can be elected during any one year; the maximum permissible number of fellows is one hundred. Majority of the fellows of the academy are Pakistani scientists eminent for their original contribution to science, who are elected by the General Body according to the procedure laid down in the bylaws. The foreign fellowship has been bestowed upon the foreign scientists of eminence who have made contributions towards scientific development in Pakistan in one way or the other.

== Research ==
The academy has a rich tradition of organizing conferences promoting the work of researchers from multiple fields of science. The academy's Lahore chapter recently held a National Research Conference in Lahore on 29 and 30 June 2007.

== Publications ==
The academy regularly publishes a quarterly journal The Proceedings of the Pakistan Academy of Sciences since 1963 that is distributed to international scientific organizations and universities by subscription and on exchange basis.

== Past Presidents ==
Presidency by profession
Field	number
Physics	3
Chemistry	4
Biology	1
Materials	1
Genetics	1
Entomology	1
Zoology	1
Toxicology	1
Mathematics	1

Timeline by Years	Presidents	Profession of science
1953 – 1956	M. Afzal Hussain	Entomology
1956 – 1961	Nazir Ahmed	Physics (Experimental)
1961 – 1967	Raziuddin Siddiqui (First term)	Mathematics (Theoretical)
1967 – 1969	Salimuzzaman Siddiqui	Chemistry (Organic)
1969 – 1972	Qudrat-i-Khuda	Chemistry (Organic)
1972 – 1974	H.K. Bhatti	Zoology
1974 – 1978	Chaudhry M. Afzal	Toxicology
1978 – 1984	Mumtaz Ali Kazi (First term)	Chemistry (Physical)
1984 – 1986	Raziuddin Siddiqui (Second term)	Mathematics (Theoretical)
1986 – 1988	Mumtaz Ali Kazi (Second term)	Chemistry (Physical)
1988 – 1992	M.D. Shami	Geology
1992 – 1996	Muhammad Amir	Genetics (Molecular)
1996 – 2003	Abdul Qadeer Khan	Metallurgy (Engineering)
2003 – 2007	Atta-ur-Rahman (First term)	Chemistry (Organic)
2007 – 2010	Ishfaq Ahmad	Physics (Nuclear)
2010 – 2015	Atta-ur-Rahman (Second term)	Chemistry (Organic)
2015 – 2017	Anwar Nasim	Biology (Molecular)
2018 – 2020	Qasim Jan	Geology
2021 – 2023	Khalid Mahmood Khan	

== See also ==
- Salimuzzaman Siddiqui, Founding Fellow of the academy
- Science and technology in Pakistan
- Pakistan Council of Scientific and Industrial Research
- Higher Education Commission of Pakistan
- Pakistan Educational Research Network
- Hussain Ebrahim Jamal Research Institute of Chemistry
