= Estonian Mathematical Society =

Mathematical society in Estonia

- Eesti Matemaatika Selts
- Abbreviation: EMS
- Predecessor: Academic Mathematical Society
- Formation: 23 February 1926; 100 years ago
- Type: Mathematical society
- Headquarters: Tartu
- Location: Estonia
- President: Jüri Lember
- Award: Arnold Humal Prize
- Website: matemaatika.eu

The Estonian Mathematical Society (Estonian: Eesti Matemaatika Selts, EMS) is a mathematical society founded in Estonia in February 1926. The EMS is based in Tartu, and is a founding member of the European Mathematical Society. It is recognised by the International Mathematical Union.

== History ==
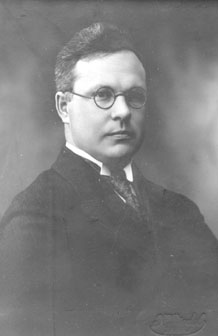
Gerhard Rägo (pictured in the 1920s) was the first president of the Estonian Mathematical Society.

The predecessor of the Estonian Mathematical Society was the Academic Mathematical Society (Estonian: Akadeemiline Matemaatika Selts), which was founded in Tartu on 23 February 1926.

In 1940 Estonia was annexed by the Soviet Union and became the Estonian SSR. The Academic Mathematical Society was forced to cease its activities, and had its last meeting in November 1940. Hans Kruus, who was at the time rector of the University of Tartu, recommended that the society be dissolved, but this was prevented from happening when Operation Barbarossa (and the subsequent occupation of Estonia by the Nazis) shifted the priorities of the Soviet Union. Society president Hermann Jaakson repeatedly tried to restart the activities of the society during the war, but was unsuccessful.

When the Second World War ended scientific societies continued to be banned in Estonia. An attempt to restart the society in 1983 was rejected by the Communist Party of Estonia. In 1987 the Soviet Union introduced perestroika, which allowed for more political independence. On 17 September 1987 the Academic Mathematical Society held its re-opening conference, and its name was changed to the Estonian Mathematical Society.

In April 1988 a Computer Science branch of the EMS was established. It was disbanded in 1993 following the formation of the Estonian Society of Informatics.

== Awards ==
=== Arnold Humal Prize ===
The Estonian Mathematical Society annually awards the Arnold Humal Prize to an Estonian mathematician under the age of 30. Because Arnold Humal obtained his PhD at the age of 26, the prize decides between equal candidates in favour of the younger. Past winners of the prize are:

- 2007 – Kristel Mikkor
- 2009 – Helle Visk
- 2010 – Evely Leetma
- 2011 – Daria Gordon
- 2012 – Indrek Zolk
- 2013 – Aleksei Lissitsin
- 2014 – Erge Ideon
- 2016 – Johann Langemets
- 2017 – Silja Veidenberg
- 2019 – Ülo Reimaa
- 2021 – Rihhard Nadel
- 2023 – Kristo Väljako and Andre Ostrak

=== Other awards ===
The EMS Publication Award (Estonian: EMS Publikatsiooniauhind) is awarded to a young mathematician with a connection to Estonia for a publication in an international mathematical journal.

The Professor Gerhard Rägo Memorial Medal has since 1990 been awarded for improving the teaching of mathematics in Estonian schools.

The Student Prize of the EMS (Estonian: Eesti Matemaatika Seltsi üliõpilaspreemia) is a scholarship awarded annually to recognise "meaningful results obtained by students in their undergraduate studies in mathematics and applications of mathematics."

The Olaf Prinitsa Prize recognises a student who has obtained a master's degree in mathematics education.

== Presidents ==
Past presidents of the Estonian Mathematical Society are:

- Gerhard Rägo (1926–1927)
- Jüri Nuut (1927–1932)
- Edgar Krahn (1932–1936)
- Hermann Jaakson (1936–1940)
- Ülo Lumiste (1987–1993)
- Mati Abel (1994–2003)
- Kalle Kaarli (2003–2009)
- Raul Kangro (elected 2009)
- Valdis Laan (2015–2018)
- Rainis Haller (2018−2022)
- Jüri Lember (2021–present)

== See also ==
- List of mathematical societies
