= Philibert Nang =

Gabonese mathematician

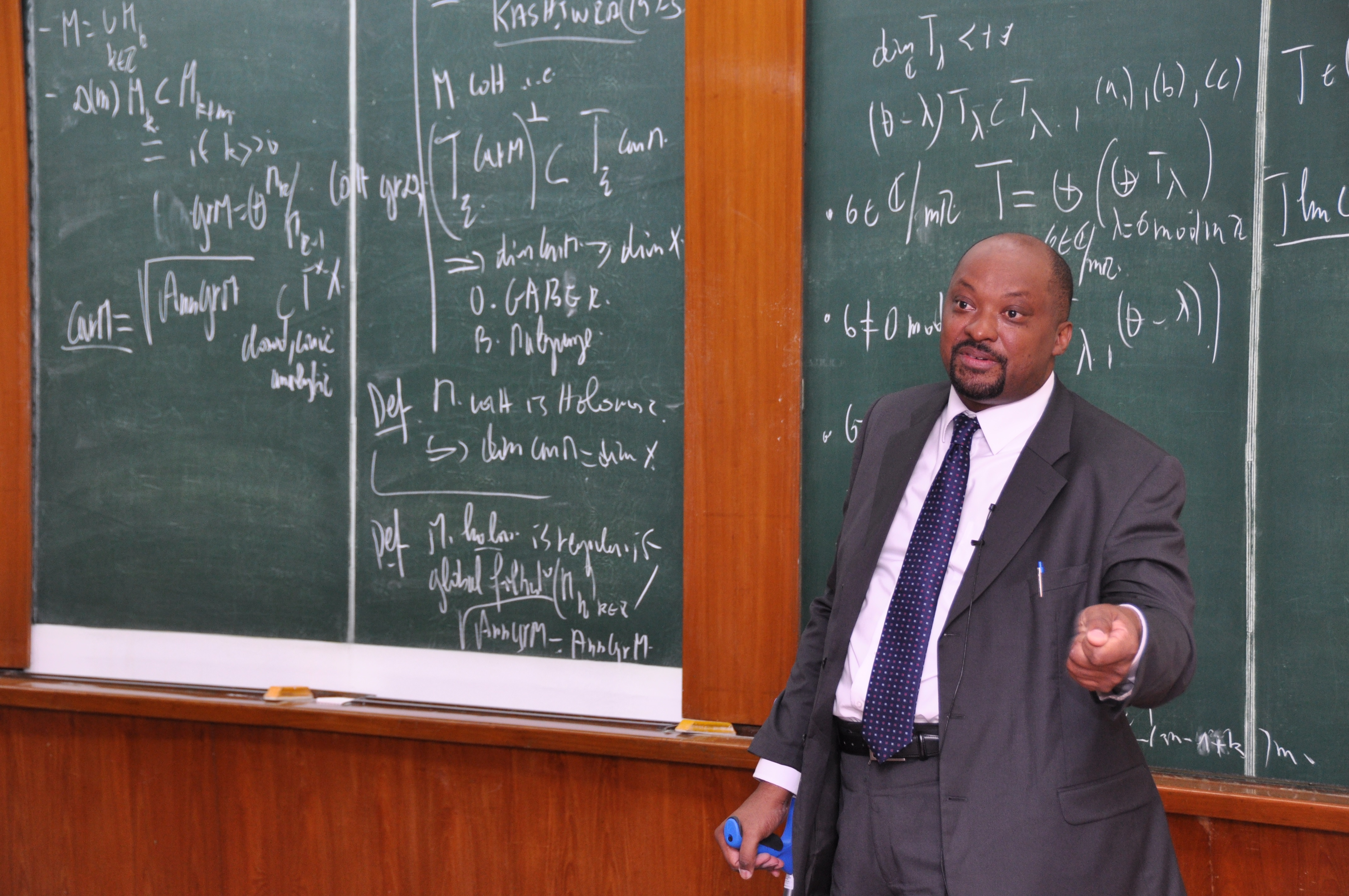
- Born: 1967 (age 58–59); Port-Gentil
- Occupation: Mathematician

Philibert Nang (born 1967) is a Gabonese mathematician known for his work in algebra (D-modules, Riemann–Hilbert correspondence).

Nang won the 2011 ICTP Ramanujan Prize for his research in mathematics, and because he conducted it in Gabon the ICTP declared: "It is hoped that his example will inspire other young African mathematicians working at the highest levels while based in Africa." He was awarded the African Mathematics Millennium Science Initiative-Phillip Griffiths Prize in 2017.

He obtained his Ph.D. from the Pierre and Marie Curie University in 1996 under the supervision of Louis Boutet de Monvel.

Nang currently serves as president of the Gabon Mathematical Society.

He has been a visiting member at the Max Planck Institute for Mathematics and at the Tata Institute of Fundamental Research. He was employed as associate professor at University of Pretoria in South Africa (2020-2024).

== Selected publications ==
- "On the classification of regular holonomic D-modules on skew-symmetric matrices", Journal of Algebra, Volume 356, Issue 1, 2012, pp. 115–132.
- "D-modules associated to the determinantal singularities", Proc. Japan Acad. Ser. A Math. Sci., Volume 80, Number 5, 2004, pp. 74–78.
- "D-modules associated to the group of similitudes", Publ. Res. I. Math. Sci., Volume 35, Number 2, 1999, pp. 223–247.
