= Alexis Bonnet =

French mathematician and investor

Alexis Bonnet is a French mathematician and investor. For his research on partial differential equations he was awarded the 1996 EMS Prize. He earned his doctorate from Pierre and Marie Curie University in 1992, under supervision of Henri Berestycki.

Bonnet subsequently joined Goldman Sachs, and was one of the founders of the management company, Methodology Asset Management, in 2005.
