= Shirin R. Tahir-Kheli =

American political scientist (born c. 2010)

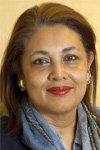
- Shirin R. Tahir-Kheli
- Born: 1944 (age 81–82); Hyderabad, Hyderabad Deccan, British India (present-day Hyderabad, India)
- Education: Ohio Wesleyan University; University of Pennsylvania
- Known for: Ambassador of the United States; Multilateral Diplomacy, Democracy, Human Rights and Women's Empowerment, and India and Pakistan Peaceful Resolutions
- Relatives: Muhammad Raziuddin Siddiqui (father)
- Scientific career
- Fields: International Relations
- Workplaces: Council on Foreign Relations; United States Commission on International Religious Freedom; Johns Hopkins University; Paul H. Nitze School of Advanced International Studies; United States Department of State The White House

Shirin R. Tahir-Kheli (born 1944) is an American political scientist who also served in the Department of State. In 2006, she was appointed as the first Ambassador for women's empowerment by the United States Secretary of State Condoleezza Rice as well as Senior Advisor to the Secretary of State on United Nations Reform. She was sworn in as the First American Muslim Ambassador in July 1990. Dr. Tahir-Kheli was the Special Assistant to the President and Senior Director for Democracy, Human Rights and International Operations at the White House National Security Council, from 2003-2005. She has served three Republican presidential administrations since 1980.

== Academic career ==
Prior to her appointment, Tahir-Kheli was the Research Professor at Johns Hopkins University Foreign Policy Institute at the Paul H. Nitze School of Advanced International Studies, in Washington, DC, where she was the founding Director of the South Asia Program at the Foreign Policy Institute (1992-2002). She served as a member of the United States Commission on International Religious Freedom, Distinguished Advisory Panel for Sandia National Laboratories (Albuquerque, New Mexico), Board of Trustees of the Carnegie Corporation of New York, and the Advisory Board of Princeton University's Institute for the Transregional Study of Contemporary Middle East, North Africa and Central Asia.

Tahir-Kheli was an alternate United States representative to the United Nations for Special Political Affairs serving from 1990 to 1993. She also served as Director of Political Military Affairs and then as Director of Near East and South Asian Affairs from 1984 to 1989 with the National Security Council staff. From 1982 to 1984, Tahir-Kheli was a member of the Policy Planning Staff at the Department of State.

== India and Pakistan ==
Ambassador Tahir-Kheli has dedicated more than a dozen years to finding areas of agreement between India and Pakistan that could change their relationship to one of productive peace. Concerning that end, she was chair of the twelve member BALUSA Group meetings composed of senior Indian, Pakistani, and U.S. participants that is geared toward influencing policy toward cooperation. She has co-chaired an important study on "Water and Security in South Asia" and has been co-chair of an effort to promote India-Pakistan cooperation in the fields of energy and the environment.

In 2001, Tahir-Kheli headed the U.S. delegation to the Commission for Human Rights in Geneva, Switzerland. In March 2003, she became Special Assistant to the President and Senior Director for Democracy, Human Rights, and International Operations at the National Security Council, The White House.

== Opposition to Donald Trump ==
In 2020, Tahir-Kheli, along with over 130 other former Republican national security officials, signed a statement that asserted that President Trump was unfit to serve another term, and "To that end, we are firmly convinced that it is in the best interest of our nation that Vice President Joe Biden be elected as the next President of the United States, and we will vote for him."

== Education ==
Ambassador Tahir-Kheli has an MA and a PhD in International Relations from the University of Pennsylvania and a BA from Ohio Wesleyan University. She is a member of the Council on Foreign Relations, and past member of the United States Commission on International Religious Freedom and the International Institute for Strategic Studies.

== Awards ==
- In 2005, Shirin Tahir-Kheli received the Carnegie Corporation of New York "Immigrants: The Pride of America" award for her contributions to public service.
- Named by Newsweek in 2011 as one of the "150 Women Who Shake the World".
- As a Carnegie Scholar, award for work on manuscript covering the 2003-2006 decision making at the White House on Democracy Promotion in the Muslim world, "Diplomacy Without Negotiation". Carnegie Corporation of New York, 2009-2011.
- 2016 Award by Carnegie for forthcoming work: "Before the Age of Prejudice: A Muslim Woman's White House Work for Three Presidents."

== Bibliography ==
- India, Pakistan and the United States: Breaking with the Past. Council on Foreign Relations. 1977. p. 156. ISBN 978-0-87-6091999.
- The United States and Pakistan: The Evolution of an Influence Relationship. Prager. 1982. p. 169. ISBN 978-0-03050471-6.
- Manipulating Religion for Political Gain in Pakistan: Consequences for the U.S. and the Region. Johns Hopkins. SAIS. 2015.

== Family and personal life ==
Tahir-Kheli is the daughter of Pakistani physicist Muhammad Raziuddin Siddiqui who migrated to Pakistan from Hyderabad, India. She is married to Raza Tahir-Kheli, Emeritus Professor of Physics, PhD, and former chairman of the physics department at Temple University. They have two grown children and four grandchildren.
