= Nazir Ahmed (physicist) =

Pakistani experimental physicist (1898–1973)

Nazir Ahmed OBE
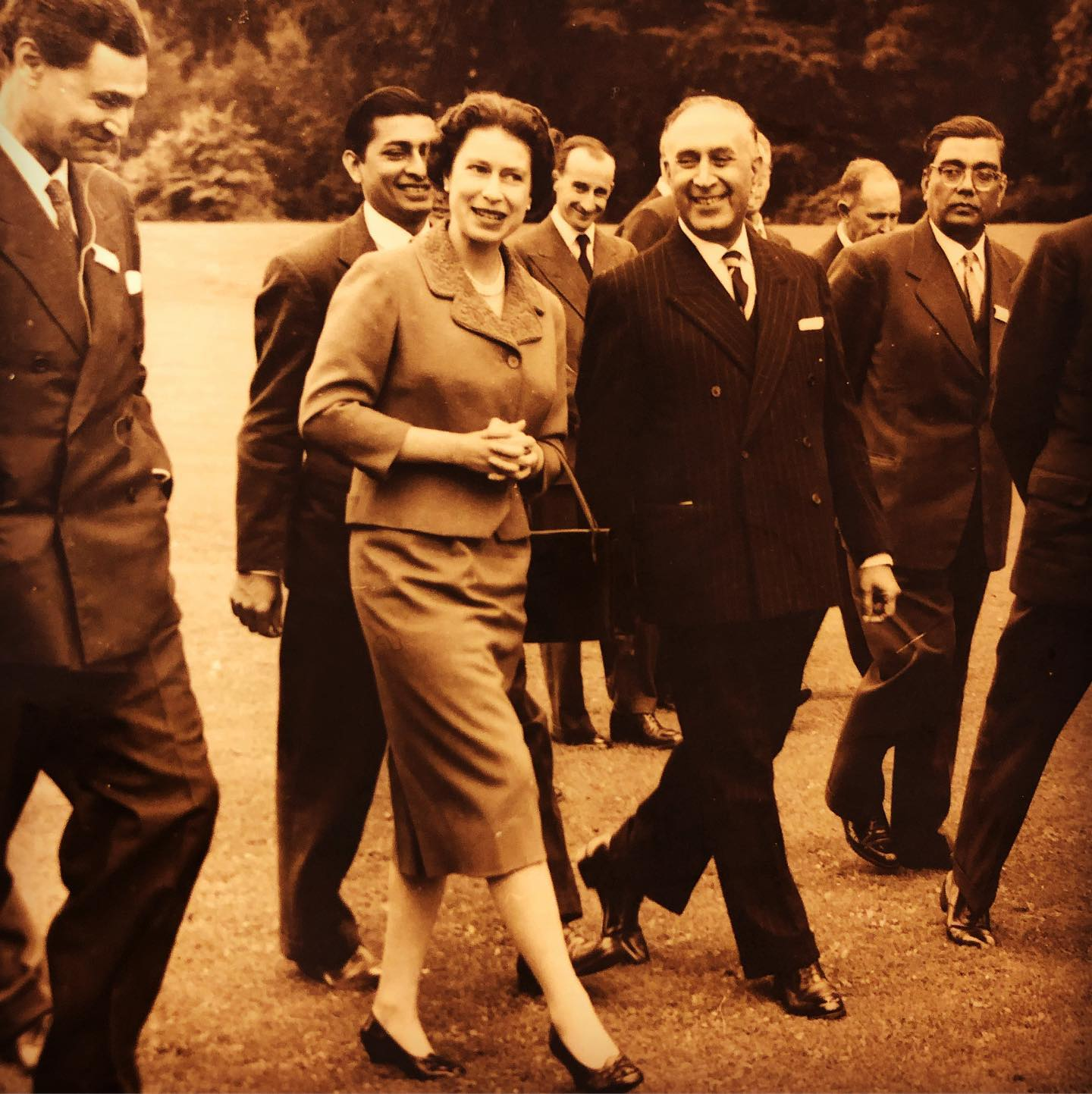
- Ahmed (right) with Queen Elizabeth II
- Born: 1 May 1898; Lahore, Punjab Province (British India)
- Died: 30 September 1973 (aged 75); Karachi, Sindh, Pakistan
- Education: Muhammadan Anglo-Oriental College; University of Cambridge
- Known for: Nuclear power generation programme
- Relatives: HMS Choudri (brother-in-law)
- Awards: Gold Medal from Pakistan Academy of Sciences
- Scientific career
- Fields: Experimental Physics
- Workplaces: Pakistan Atomic Energy Commission (PAEC), Technological Laboratory, India; Federal Bureau of Statistics
- Doctoral advisor: Ernest Rutherford

Nazir Ahmed (Note: Also spelled as Nazir Ahmad) OBE (1 May 1898 – 30 September 1973) was a Pakistani experimental physicist and the first chairman of the Pakistan Atomic Energy Commission (PAEC) from 1956 to 1960.

He was also the first vice president of Pakistan central Cotton Committee from 1948 to 1956.

== Life ==
Ahmed attended the University of Cambridge, receiving a PhD in experimental physics, working with Ernest Rutherford in 1925. His PhD thesis was titled "Absorption and scattering of γ-rays".

In 1926, Ahmed joined Arthur Holly Compton's expedition to Kashmir to study the effects of altitude and latitude on cosmic rays.

In 1930, Ahmed came back to British India, where he was appointed assistant director at the Technological Laboratory, Central Cotton Committee of India, and became its director after one year. While living in Bombay, he married Razia, a member of the Khader Nawaz Khan family of Madras and the Carnatic Sultanate; her sister Rafia married Ahmed's friend, Commodore HMS Choudri.

On 9 June 1938, George VI appointed Ahmed an Officer of the Most Excellent Order of the British Empire.

In 1945, Ahmed was appointed member of the Indian Tariff Board.

Ahmed was involved in efforts to build a heavy water plant in Multan, but the Pakistan Industrial Development Corporation turned down his request. In 1960, he was transferred to Ministry of Science and Technology under the administration of President Ayub Khan.

== Fellowships ==
- A fellow of the Pakistan Academy of Sciences (1953–1970).

== Award named after Ahmad ==
- To honor his services, Dr. Nazir Ahmad Award was named after him by the Pakistan Academy of Sciences.

== Research papers ==
- Tubewell Theory and Practice, published by Pakistan Academy of Sciences – (Nazir Ahmed) (1979).
- Survey of Fuels & Electric Power Resources in Pakistan, published by Pakistan Academy of Sciences – (Nazir Ahmed) (1972).
