= Union of Bulgarian Mathematicians =

Learned society in Bulgaria

- Съюз на математиците в България
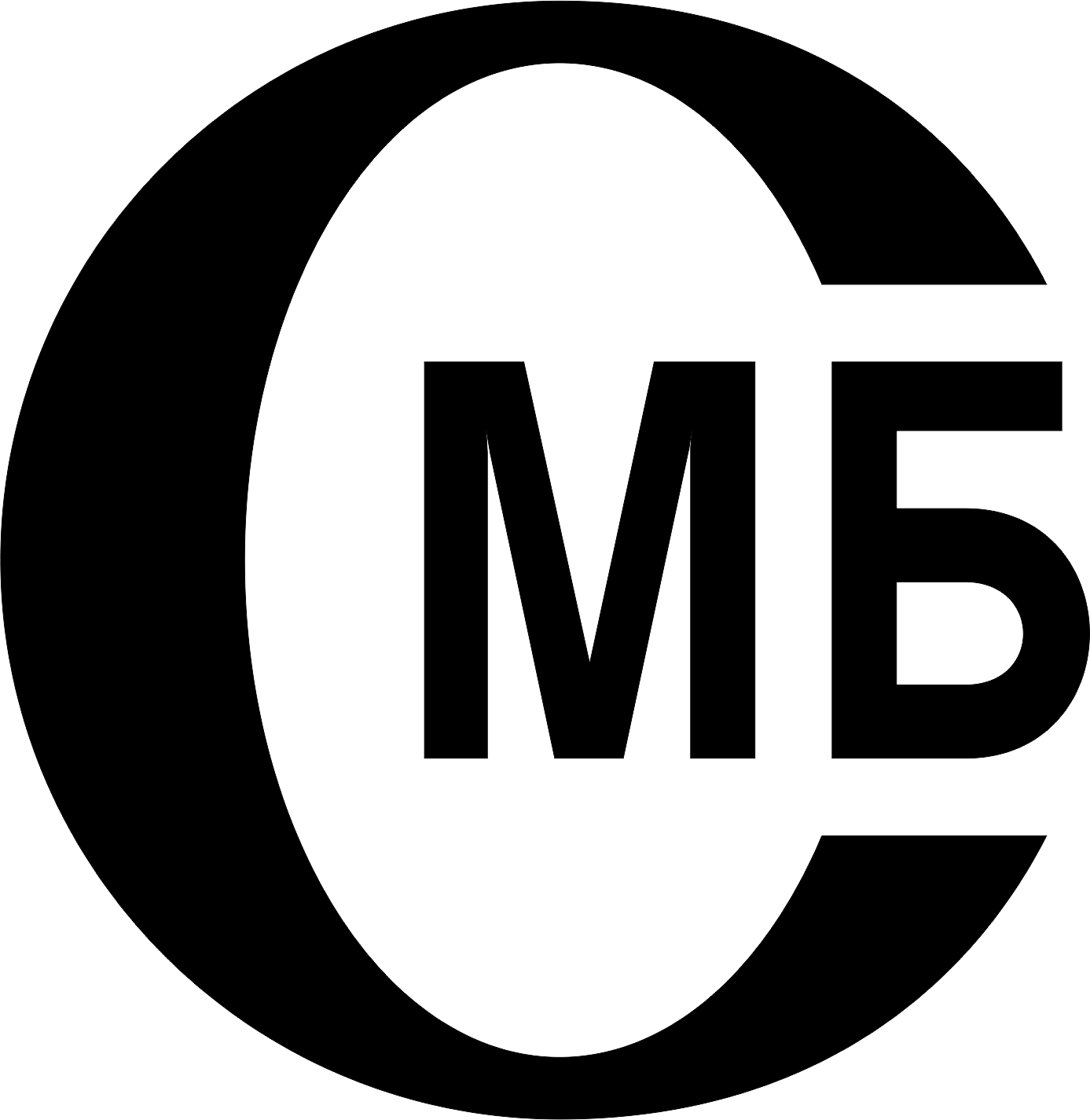
- Abbreviation: UBM, СМБ
- Formation: 14 February 1898; 128 years ago
- Type: Learned society
- Headquarters: Sofia
- Location: Bulgaria
- President: Nikolai Nikolov
- Website: www.math.bas.bg/smb/

The Union of Bulgarian Mathematicians or UBM (Bulgarian: Съюз на математиците в България, СМБ) is a learned society of mathematicians and computer scientists in Bulgaria. The UBM is based in Sofia, and is a member of the European Mathematical Society. It is recognised by the International Mathematics Union.

The Union of Bulgarian Mathematicians describes its purpose as "to bring together people who are interested in mathematics and computer science or are involved in activities related to those fields."

== History ==
The predecessor of the Union of Bulgarian Mathematicians was the Sofia Physical and Mathematical Society, which was founded in Sofia on 14 February 1898, several months after the first International Congress of Mathematicians was held in Zurich in August 1897. On its 40th anniversary in 1938 the society was renamed the Bulgarian Physical and Mathematical Society, due to its increasing national importance in Bulgaria. It stopped functioning in 1950 and was re-established in 1960.

On 17 October 1971 the society amicably split into the Society of Bulgarian Mathematicians and the Society of Bulgarian Physicists (now the Union of Physicists in Bulgaria). The first president of the independent mathematical society was Alipi Mateev. In April 1977 the society changed its name to the Union of Bulgarian Mathematicians.

== Activities and publications ==
Since 1968 the Union of Bulgarian Mathematicians holds an annual spring conference with a scientific programme. Reports from the spring conference are published in the society journal Mathematics and Education in Mathematics, which was founded in 1972. The UBM organises several conferences and seminars at a national level, and is involved in the running of mathematics competitions for students, as well as in sending a team to the International Olympiads in Mathematics and Informatics.

== Presidents ==
Some past presidents of the Union of Bulgarian Mathematicians, including its history before becoming independent, are:

- Ivan Salabashev
- Emanuil Ivanov
- Stefan Lafchiev (president for over 30 years)
- Georgi Nadzhakov
- Bojan Petkanchin
- Petko Ivanov
- Alipi Mateev
- Ljubomir Iliev
- Ljubomir Davidov
- Chavdar Lozanov

== See also ==
- List of mathematical societies
