= Capital of Pakistan =

Capital of Pakistan can mean any of the following:

- Karachi, Karachi Capital Territory (1948-1958)
- Rawalpindi, Temporary capital (1958-1967)
- Islamabad, Islamabad Capital Territory (1967-present)
