= Hellenic Mathematical Society =

Mathematics society in Greece

Coordinates: 37.9813°N 23.7323°E

- Ελληνική Μαθηματική Εταιρία
- Abbreviation: ΕME
- Formation: 1918; 108 years ago
- Type: Scientific
- Purpose: To develop scientific research, pedagogy, and professional code of conduct in Mathematics in Greece.
- Headquarters: Panepistimiou 34, Athens, 10679, Greece
- Official language: Greek
- Website: www.hms.gr

The Hellenic Mathematical Society (HMS) (Greek: Ελληνική Μαθηματική Εταιρεία) is a learned society which promotes the study of mathematics in Greece. It was founded in 1918 in Athens, and publishes the Bulletin of the Hellenic Mathematical Society (Δελτίο της Ελληνικής Μαθηματικής Εταιρίας) among other research and educational publications. It is a member of the European Mathematical Society. The HMS also organizes national math competitions.

== Objectives ==
Amongst the main objectives of the HMS are:

- the advancement of mathematics;
- the fostering of free exchange of information between mathematicians, scientists and the society at large;
- the substantial and continuous improvement of mathematical education and the advancement of general education;
- to inform Greek mathematicians on recent progress made in science and technology and offer them practical assistance in matters which may occur during their work at school.

== Members ==
As of July 2022, the HMS has 12,000 members and 39 regional branches across Greece.

== See also ==
- European Mathematical Society
- List of Mathematical Societies
