= Venezuelan Mathematical Association =

Mathematical society in Venezuela

- Asociación Matemática Venezolana
- Abbreviation: AMV
- Predecessor: Sociedad Venezolana de Matemáticas
- Formation: January 1990; 36 years ago
- Type: Mathematical society
- Location: Venezuela
- President: Luis Angel Rodríguez
- Website: sites.google.com/view/amve/

The Venezuelan Mathematical Association (Spanish: Asociación Matemática Venezolana, AMV) is a mathematical society founded in Venezuela in January 1990. The AMV has chapters in four Venezuelan cities, and is a member of the Unión Matemática de América Latina y el Caribe. It is recognised by the International Mathematics Union.

== History ==
The precursor to the AMV was the Venezuelan Mathematical Society (Spanish: Sociedad Venezolana de Matemáticas), which was founded at the Third Venezuelan Congress of Mathematicians, held in October 1980 at the University of Zulia in Maracaibo. The society functioned poorly and soon after effectively ceased to exist.

Following several failed attempts at reactivating the society, the Venezuelan Mathematical Association was founded in January 1990. Within a year the AMV had branches in Caracas, Maracaibo, Mérida, and Barquisimeto.

Since the mid 2010s the AMV has had difficulty fulfulling its duties, due to the ongoing crisis in Venezuela. The AMV has been unable to physically publish its Bulletin since 2013, and struggles to pay membership fees to the IMU. The crisis has also led many mathematicians to leave the country.

== Activities ==
The AMV organises the Venezuelan Mathematics Seminars (Spanish: Jornadas Matemáticas Venezolanas), the first of which were held at the First Venezuelan Congress of Mathematicians in Mérida in 1977. In May 2024 the 33rd Jornadas were held as a hybrid event in Caracas. The AMV also organises events to celebrate the International Day of Mathematics.

== Publications ==
The AMV publishes the Bulletin of the Venezuelan Mathematical Association (Spanish: Boletín de la AMV), which is the preeminent Venezuelan mathematics journal. The journal is indexed by zbMATH.

== Governance ==
Each regional chapter of the AMV has one representative on the board of directors. As of 2024, the directors are:

- Caracas: Luis Angel Rodríguez (President of the AMV)
- Barquisimeto: Neptalí Romero
- Mérida: Oswaldo Araujo
- Maracaibo: Tobías Rosas

The regional chapters have autonomy to manage their own budget and activities.

== See also ==
- List of mathematical societies
