= Mumtaz Ali Kazi =

Pakistani scientist (1928-1999)

- Born: June 25, 1928; Hyderabad, Sindh, British India
- Died: January 25, 1999 (aged 70); Karachi, Sindh, Pakistan
- Education: King's College London
- Spouse: Gohar Mumtaz Kazi
- Children: 5, including Abid Ali Kazi
- Scientific career
- Fields: Organic chemistry
- Workplaces: University of Sindh

Mumtaz Ali Kazi (25 June 1928 – 25 January 1999), popularly known as M.A. Kazi, was one of Pakistan's leading scientists and educators. He was President of the Pakistan Academy of Sciences from 1978 to 1988 and President of the Chemical Society of Pakistan from 1977 to 1990.

Kazi completed his doctorate in chemistry in 1955 from King's College London becoming one of the first PhDs of Pakistan. His professional career spanned over 45 years during which he authored a number of books, papers and articles on science and education. Kazi's major topic of research was Islam and science.

== Biography ==
Kazi received his early education at Noor Muhammad High School, Hyderabad, Sindh and did his M.Sc from D. J. Sindh Government Science College, Karachi. He did his PhD from the King's College, London in 1955 and on his return to the country joined the University of Sindh, Jamshoro as the founder director of the Institute of Chemistry and the dean of the Science Faculty.

In 1972, Kazi was appointed the Secretary, Department of Education, Government of Sindh. Several reforms were initiated during his tenure in the education sector in the province of Sindh. A year later he moved to Islamabad as the founder chairman, University Grants Commission (later renamed as the Higher Education Commission.

In 1977, Kazi took over the position of Federal Secretary, Ministry of Education, Government of Pakistan. He was the architect of the new National Education Policy of 1979 which was widely acclaimed within the country and outside.

In 1980, Kazi was appointed as the Adviser to the President of Pakistan and later in 1984 as the Adviser to the Prime Minister of Pakistan on Science & Technology with rank and status of Minister of State.

Kazi had been the chairman of Pakistan Council of Science and Technology during 1980-88 and the president of the Pakistan Academy of Sciences for two terms during 1978–84 and 1985–88. He remained President of the Chemical Society of Pakistan during 1977–1990.

Kazi was associated with a number of international organizations. He was a member of executive board of UNESCO for a number of years and also served on the Science and Technology Advisory Committee of the United Nations. From 1989 to 1996, he was associated with the Organisation of Islamic Cooperation (OIC) Standing Committee on Scientific and Technological Cooperation (COMSTECH) as its chief executive and chairman of its executive committee with and rank and status of a federal minister. He remained the president of the Islamic World Academy of Sciences (IAS), Amman, Jordan, till his death in 1999.

The Institute of Chemistry at the University of Sindh was named in his honor in 1999.

== Service record ==
- Coordinator General COMSTECH, Islamabad (1988–1996)
- Adviser to the Prime Minister of Pakistan for Science and Technology (Minister of State), Islamabad (1985–1988)
- Adviser to the President of Pakistan for Science and Technology (Minister of State), Islamabad (1980–1985)
- Federal Secretary, Ministry of Education, Government of Pakistan, Islamabad (1977–1980)
- Chairman, University Grants Commission, Islamabad (1973–1980)
- Secretary, Department of Education, Government of Sindh, Karachi (1972–1973)

== Association with national organizations ==
- Professor Emeritus, University of Sindh (1989–1999)
- Merit Professor of Chemistry, University of Sindh (1972–1988)
- Chairman, Pakistan Council of Science and Technology (1980–1988)
- President, Pakistan Academy of Science (1978–1984) and (1986–1988)
- President, Pakistan Association of Scientists and Scientific Profession (1985–1990)
- President, Pakistan Council of Research in Water Resources (1982–1988)
- President, Pakistan Building Research Council (1982–1988)
- President, Pakistan Chemical Society (1977–1990)
- President, Sindh Science Society (1971–1979)
- Chairman, board of governors, National Institute of Silicon Technology (1985–1988)
- Chairman, governing board, Institute of Oceanography (1982–1988)
- Chairman, board of governors, Pakistan Academy of Letters (1978–1980)
- Chairman, National Book Council of Pakistan (1977–1980)
- Chairman, board of governors, Institute of Development Economics (1977–1978)
- Chairman, executive board, US Educational Foundation in Pakistan (1974–1976)
- Chairman, Universities Coordination Council (1973–1978)
- Chairman, Higher Education Committee (1973–1978)
- Member, board of trustees, Pakistan Science Foundation (1982–1988)
- Member, Pakistan Atomic Energy Commission (1973–1999)
- Member, Pakistan Sports Board (1973–1980)
- Member, Syndicates of Universities of Punjab, Karachi, Sindh and Quad-e-Azam (1973–1977)
- Member, board of governors, Sindh Educational Foundation (1994–1999)
- Member, board of governors, Institute of Sindhology (1982–1999)
- Member, Sindh Language Authority (1993—1996)

== Association with UNESCO ==
- Member, executive board of UNESCO (1978–1983) and (1987–1989)
- Member, Alternate leader, leader of Pakistan delegation to UNESCO General Conference in 1976, 1978, 1979, 1982, 1985, 1987, 1989
- Member, Special Committee of the executive board of UNESCO (1978–1983)
- UNESCO Visitor-ship to Iraq to visit Cultural, Educational and Scientific Institutions (1982)
- Leader of Pakistan Delegation to the second CASTASIA Conference, Manila, Philippines (1982)
- UNESCO Senior visitorship, APIED Program, Thailand, Singapore, Malaysia and Indonesia (1980)
- UNESCO Visitorship, Bangkok, New Delhi, Nairobi, Cairo and Paris (1980)
- Leader Pakistan Delegation to the Conference of International Bureau of Education, Geneva, Switzerland, (1979)
- Alternate Leader to Fourth Regional Conference of Ministers of Education and those responsible for Economic Planning in Asia and Oceania, Colombo, Sri Lanka (1978)
- UNESCO Delegation to international conference on "Peace in the minds of men", Nairobi (1988)

== Association with United Nations ==
- Leader of Pakistan Delegation and vice-chairman of Intergovernmental Committee on Science and Technology for Development (1985–1987)
- Member United Nations Advisory Committee on Science and Technology (1984–1989)
- Chairman UN ACASTD Panel on Mobilization of Financial Resources for Science and Technology in the developing countries, Islamabad (1986)

== Association with Organization of Islamic Cooperation (OIC) ==
- President, Islamic World Academy of Sciences, Jordan (1987–1999)
- Chairman, Executive Committee of the OIC Standing Committee on Scientific and Technological Cooperation in the Islamic Countries COMSTECH (1983–1996)
- Vice-Chairman of the Scientific Council, Islamic Foundation for Science. Technology and Development (1982–1989)

== Fellowships ==
- Fellow, Royal Society of Chemistry, London (1967–1999)
- Fellow, Pakistan Academy of Sciences, Islamabad (1972–1999)
- Founding Fellow, Islamic World Academy of Sciences, Amman (1986–1999)
- Fellow, Pakistan Chemical Society, Islamabad (1990–1999)

== Awards and medals ==
- Hilal-e-Imtiaz, (Pakistan"s Second highest civil award), awarded Posthumously (2000)
- DSC (Honors Causa) by the University of Karachi (1995)
- Pakistan Academy of Sciences Shield for Fellows who have completed 20 years of fellowship (1993)
- Sindh University Gold Medal for rendering distinguished service to Higher Education, Culture and Science (1992)
- Hamdard Foundation Plaque (1992)
- Lateef Gold Medal (1991)
- UNESCO Medal (1984 and 1989)
- Iqbal Centenary Medal (1977)
- Silver Palm Scouts Medal (1977)
