= Luxembourg Mathematical Society =

Mathematical society in Luxembourg

- Société mathématique du Luxembourg
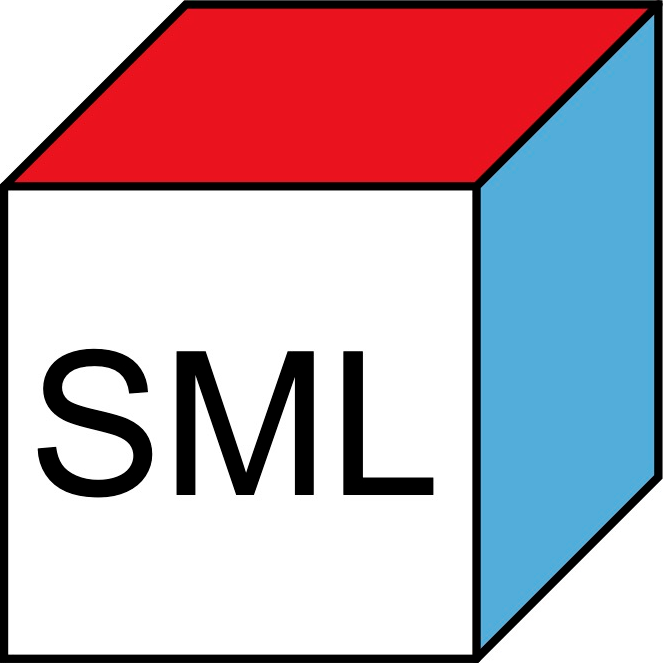
- Abbreviation: SML
- Formation: January 1989; 37 years ago
- Type: Mathematical society
- Headquarters: University of Luxembourg
- Location: Luxembourg
- President: Giovanni Peccati
- Website: math.uni.lu/sml/

The Luxembourg Mathematical Society (French: Société mathématique du Luxembourg, SML) was founded in January 1989 on the initiative of Professor Jean-Paul Pier.

Its mission is the promotion of Pure and Applied Mathematics. The scope of action of the SML includes

- the organization of conferences, workshops, seminars, round table discussions etc.
- the edition of books, mathematical journals, newsletters etc.
- the representation of Mathematics and the mathematics profession in Luxembourg inside and outside the Grand-Duchy of Luxembourg

The SML is a member of the European Mathematical Society (EMS). It has reciprocity agreements with the American Mathematical Society and the Royal Spanish Mathematical Society.
