= Latvian Mathematical Society =

Learned society

- Latvijas Matemātikas Biedrība
- Abbreviation: LMB
- Founded: 1993
- Type: Scientific society
- Headquarters: University of Latvia
- Location: Riga, Latvia
- Fields: Mathematics
- President: Andrejs Reinfelds
- Website: https://www.mathematics.lv/

The Latvian Mathematical Society (in Latvian: Latvijas Matemātikas Biedrība, LMB) is a learned society of mathematicians from Latvia, recognized by the International Mathematical Union as the national mathematical organization for its country. Its goals are stimulating mathematical activity in Latvia while consolidating the former achievements, and it has the responsibility of representing the Latvian mathematicians at the international level. It was founded in 1993.

The current president is Andrejs Reinfelds, from the University of Latvia, Riga.
