= Australian Association of Mathematics Teachers =

The Australian Association of Mathematics Teachers (AAMT) is the main representative organisation of mathematics teachers in Australia. Membership is via affiliated state organisations. The AAMT conducts a number of activities including Reach for the stars, an activity for students, as well as submissions to government bodies and reports on issues relevant to mathematics teaching.

== Structure ==
The AAMT is a federation of 8 affiliated associations of teachers of mathematics, one from each Australian State and Territory:

The AAMT is governed by a council made up of a representatives from each of these associations, as well as an elected President, Treasurer, and either a President Elect or an Immediate Past President.

The day-to-day affairs of the association are managed by an office staff based primarily in Canberra, Australian Capital Territory.

== Membership ==
AAMT does not direct membership; members join their local affiliated association and are then automatically a member of AAMT. AAMT has approximately 4000 individual and institutional members.

== Standards ==
The AAMT publish Standards for Excellence in Teaching Mathematics in Australian Schools as a guide for the improvement and maintenance of teaching standards in mathematics in Australian schools.

== Journals ==
The AAMT publishes three journals:

- Australian Primary Mathematics Classroom (APMC) - primary school mathematics education
- The Australian Mathematics Education Journal (AMEJ) - (Secondary school up to early tertiary level)

The AMEJ superseded AAMT's earlier publications in 2019. These were:

- The Australian Mathematics Teacher (AMT) - secondary school mathematics up to age 16
- Australian Senior Mathematics Journal (ASMJ) - senior secondary (Years 11 and 12) and early tertiary mathematics.
