= Union of Czech mathematicians and physicists =

The Union of Czech mathematicians and physicists (Czech: Jednota českých matematiků a fyziků, JČMF) is one of the oldest learned societies in Czech lands existing to this day. It was founded in 1862 as the Association for free lectures in mathematics and physics (Union of Czech mathematicians). From the beginning, its goal was improvement of teaching physics and mathematics at schools on all levels and of all types and further support and promote the development of those sciences. As a consequence of patriotic efforts, the Association was enlarged in 1869 into the Union of Czech mathematicians and physicists. Members of the Union were largely teachers at high schools and post-secondary learning institutes, and further professors at universities and scientists.

In 1870, the Union started publishing the News of the Union of Czech mathematicians and physicists, which in 1872 gave rise to the Journal for fostering mathematics and physics (Czech: Časopis pro pěstování matematiky a fysiky 1872 to 1950, Časopis pro pěstování matematiky 1950-1990, Mathematica Bohemica since 1990), the very first mathematical journal in Austria-Hungary. Year later, the Union was already publishing textbooks and scientific monographs. After the creation of independent Czechoslovakia (1918) it became a de facto monopoly qualified publisher of textbooks, scientific books, and journals in the area of mathematics and physics.

In early 1950s, the Union had to transfer its property to the newly established Czechoslovak Academy of Sciences (ČSAV) and it became a learned society affiliated with ČSAV. The mathematical part of its library became the basis of the library of the Mathematical Institute of ČSAV, where it is still now.

Today, the Union has about 2500 members, half of whom are high-school teachers. It is one of the largest scientific organizations in the Czech Republic. The Union itself or in collaboration with universities and research institutes organizes national as well as international conferences, symposia, seminars, and Summer or Winter schools. The Union follows teaching of mathematics and physics and proposes improvements. The Union fosters talented students and participates in the organization of the Mathematical and Physical olympiad and other student competitions.
