= Pakistan Mathematical Society =

Learned society

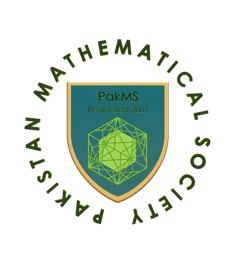
- Pakistan Mathematical Society
- Abbreviation: PakMS
- Formation: June 26, 2001; 25 years ago
- Type: Non-profit learned organization
- Legal status: Scientific Organization
- Purpose: Promote mathematical sciences in the country
- Location: Islamabad Capital Territory
- Members: Pakistanis
- Official language: English and Urdu
- President: Emeritus Professor Dr. Qaiser Mushtaq, QAU
- Main organ: Executive Council
- Affiliations: AMS, LMS, AustMS, CMS, and IMU
- Website: Pakistan Mathematical Society

The Pakistan Mathematical Society (Urdu: پاکستان ریاضیاتی معاشرہ, Acronym: PakMS), is a learned society for mathematical sciences, possibly the largest learned society of its own kind to promote mathematics in the country. It is a non-profit organization. The Pakistan Mathematical Society is an association of professional mathematicians dedicated to promote mathematical science and research and interest in the country. The organization annually published various publications, supports conferences and workshops.

== History ==
15th May 2001, Mathematicians at Quaid-e-Azam University convened a moot at the Best Western Hotel in Islamabad. The PakMS applied for registration on 16 November 2001. After a lengthy scrutiny it was finally registered under the ACT XXI of 1860. It was also registered with the Pakistan Science Foundation on 17 February 2003.

== Publications ==
The PakMS publishes quarterly newsletter, known as PakMS Newsletter (ISSN 1816-1925). It is free of cost and posted at the website of the Society. It is also exchanged with the mathematical societies with whom PakMS has reciprocity arrangements. In March 2002, first issue was published. The Society published two issues in the first year and three issues in the second year. Afterwards, the society has been publishing four issues every year.
