= List of Pakistani scientists =

This is a list of prominent Pakistani scientists.

== A ==
- Abdul Hameed Nayyar, physicist
- Sitara Brooj Akbar, Scientist and Child prodigy
- Abdul Majid, rocket scientist and engineer
- Abdul Qadeer Khan, metallurgical engineer
- Abdullah Sadiq, nuclear physicist
- Abdus Salam, theoretical physicist (Nobel Laureate 1979)
- Ahmad Hasan Dani, archaeologist
- Ansar Pervaiz, nuclear scientist
- Anwar Nasim, molecular biologist
- Arif Zaman, mathematician and statistician
- Asad A. Abidi, electrical engineer
- Asghar Qadir, mathematician and cosmologist
- Atta ur Rahman, organic chemist
- Awais Khan, plant geneticist

== B ==
- Bina Shaheen Siddiqui, chemist

== F ==
- Dr Faiz Jalil , Technology scientist
- Faheem Hussain, theoretical physicist
- Fayyazuddin, theoretical physicist

== G ==
- Ghulam Dastagir Alam, theoretical physicist
- Ghulam Murtaza, theoretical physicist

== H ==
- Hakeem Muhammad Saeed, medical researcher
- Haroon Ahmed, electrical engineer
- Hassan Raza, Computer Scientist; Computational Biologist

== I ==
- Ishfaq Ahmad (computer scientist)
- Iqbal Hussain Qureshi, chemist
- Irfan Siddiqi, physicist in quantum measurement & nano-science
- Irshad Hussain, chemist
- Ishfaq Ahmad, nuclear physicist
- Ishrat Hussain Usmani, nuclear physicist
- Ismat Beg, mathematician

== J ==
- Javaid Laghari, electrical engineer
- Javed Iqbal Kazi, renal pathologist

== K ==
- Kushnood Ahmed Siddiqui, scientist

== M ==
- M. A. B. Beg, theoretical particle physicist
- Muhammad Iqbal Choudhary, organic chemist
- Muhammad Masud Ahmad, theoretical physicist
- Muhammad Suhail Zubairy, physicist in quantum optics
- Muhammad Yar Khohaver, chemist
- Mujahid Kamran, theoretical physicist
- Mumtaz Ali Kazi, chemist
- Muneer Ahmad Rashid, applied mathematician
- Munir Ahmad Khan, nuclear engineer
- Muhammad Awais, applied mathematician, COMSATS University Islamabad, Attock Campus

== N ==
- Nazir Ahmed, nuclear physicist
- Nergis Mavalvala, astrophysicist
- Naweed Syed, neuroscientist

== P ==
- Pervez Hoodbhoy, nuclear physicist
- Peter Finke, particle physicist

== Q ==
- Qaisar Shafi, theoretical physicist
- Qamar-uz-Zaman Chaudhry, meteorologist
- Qasim Mehdi, molecular biologist
- M. Qasim Jan, geologist

== R ==
- Rafi Muhammad Chaudhry, nuclear physicist
- Rayid Ghani, computer scientist
- Raziuddin Siddiqui, astrophysicist
- Riaz-ud-Din, theoretical physicist

== S ==
- Safdar Kiyani, ecologist
- Salim Mehmud, nuclear scientist
- Salim-uz-Zaman Siddiqui, chemist
- Samar Mubarakmand, nuclear physicist
- Shahid Hussain Bokhari, computer systems engineer
- Shaukat Hameed Khan, theoretical physicist
- Sultan Bashiruddin Mahmood, nuclear and controls engineer
- Syed Tajammul Hussain, chemist and nano-technologist
- Sarfaraz K. Niazi, biopharmacist

== T ==
- Tasneem M. Shah, theoretical physicist
- Tasneem Zehra Hussain, string theorist
- Tariq Mustafa, nuclear scientist

== U ==
- Umar Saif, computer scientist

== Z ==
- Zia Mian, nuclear physicist

== See also ==
- Science and technology in Pakistan
