= Viqar Uddin Ahmad =

Pakistani chemist

- Born: 6 July 1940; Allahabad, British India
- Died: 29 June 2019 (aged 78); Karachi, Sindh, Pakistan
- Education: Allahabad University; University of Karachi; University of Bonn
- Known for: Isolation and structural elucidation of natural products from Pakistani medicinal plants
- Awards: Sitara-i-Imtiaz (1996); Khwarizmi Prize (1998); Hilal-i-Imtiaz (2006); HEC Distinguished National Professor (2004)
- Scientific career
- Fields: Organic chemistry; natural product chemistry; phytochemistry
- Workplaces: H. E. J. Research Institute of Chemistry; University of Karachi; International Center for Chemical and Biological Sciences
- Doctoral advisor: Salimuzzaman Siddiqui

Viqar Uddin Ahmad (6 July 1940 – 29 June 2019) was a Pakistani organic chemist who specialised in the chemistry of natural products at the H. E. J. Research Institute of Chemistry, University of Karachi. He served as co-director from 1990 to 1999 and as dean of the university's Faculty of Science from 1994 to 2000.

== Early life and education ==
Ahmad was born on 6 July 1940 in Allahabad, British India. He completed his MSc in chemistry at the University of Allahabad in 1959, standing first in his class and receiving a gold medal from the university. After moving to Pakistan, he enrolled as a doctoral student at the University of Karachi, where he worked under the supervision of the organic chemist Salimuzzaman Siddiqui and, in 1966, became the first person to be awarded a PhD in chemistry by the university. He subsequently moved to West Germany for post-doctoral studies and was awarded a second doctorate (Dr. rer. nat.) by the University of Bonn in 1968.

== Career ==
Ahmad was associated with the H. E. J. Research Institute of Chemistry from its foundation within the University of Karachi's Department of Chemistry in 1967. He became a full professor at the institute in 1976 and was later awarded a Doctor of Science (D.Sc.) by the University of Karachi in 1992. From 1988 to 1989, he held an Alexander von Humboldt Fellowship at Erlangen, Germany.

When the institute was reorganised in 1990 into the International Center for Chemical and Biological Sciences (ICCBS) under the directorship of Atta-ur-Rahman, Ahmad was appointed co-director of the H. E. J. Research Institute, a position he held until his retirement from the post in 1999. He was appointed dean of the Faculty of Science at the University of Karachi on 19 March 1994 and held the post until his formal retirement on 5 July 2000; one week later, on 12 July 2000, he was reappointed as professor at the H. E. J. Research Institute of Chemistry, where he continued to supervise research for the remainder of his life.

Ahmad's research focused on the isolation, purification and structural elucidation of biologically active natural products from Pakistani medicinal plants, and on the chemistry of alkaloids, terpenoids, saponins and carbohydrates. His work on compounds includes eudesmane sesquiterpenes with activity against Escherichia coli, Staphylococcus aureus and Bacillus anthracis, triterpenoidal and steroidal saponins with brine shrimp toxicity, and a saponin from a Turkish plant that showed hypotensive activity in anaesthetised rats.

During a nine-month Fulbright Fellowship in 1993, Ahmad was a visiting researcher at Cornell University in Ithaca, New York, where he contributed to the 12-step total synthesis of an alkaloid isolated from an insect. During the same fellowship, he also lectured in the chemistry departments of Central Michigan University, Georgia Tech and Georgia State University.

From 1995, Ahmad served as an editor of the Journal of the Chemical Society of Pakistan, succeeding Z. H. Zaidi and working alongside Atta-ur-Rahman. He was an elected member of the Council of the Pakistan Academy of Sciences and a fellow of the academy, as well as a fellow of The World Academy of Sciences (TWAS), formerly the Third World Academy of Sciences, and of the Chemical Society of Pakistan.

== Selected bibliography ==
Ahmad authored or co-authored eight books.

- Atta-ur-Rahman and V. U. Ahmad, 13C-NMR of Natural Products (Springer, 1992).
- V. U. Ahmad and A. Basha, Spectroscopic Data of Steroid Glycosides (five volumes, Springer, 2006–2007), covering over 3,500 naturally occurring steroid glycosides.

== Awards and honours ==
The Government of Pakistan conferred the Sitara-i-Imtiaz on him on 23 March 1996, and the higher civil award Hilal-i-Imtiaz on 23 March 2006. On 4 February 1998, he received the Khwarizmi Prize from the President of Iran at a ceremony in Tehran. He was awarded the DuPont Science Cash Award in Chemistry in 2003 and, in March 2004, was appointed a Distinguished National Professor by the Higher Education Commission of Pakistan. He received the commission's Outstanding Research Award for 2005–06.
