= Science and technology in Pakistan =

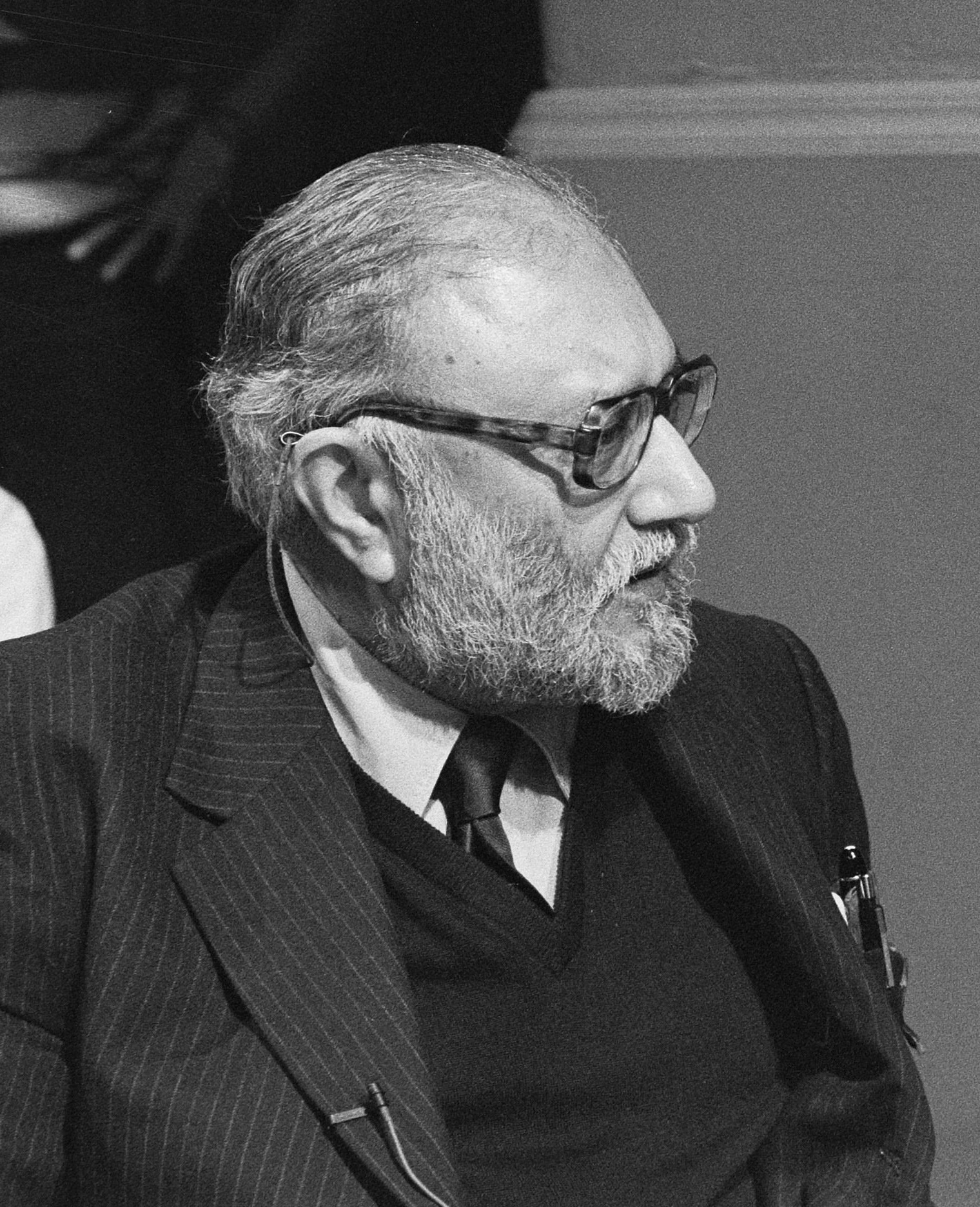
Abdus Salam was the world's second scientist from a Muslim country to win a Nobel Prize.

Science and technology have been pivotal in Pakistan's development since its inception. The country boasts a large pool of scientists, engineers, doctors, and technicians actively contributing to these fields.

Liaquat Ali Khan, Pakistan's first Prime Minister, initiated reforms to improve higher education and scientific research. However, significant growth in science occurred after the establishment of the Higher Education Commission in 2002, which supported science initiatives and sponsored the Pakistan Academy of Sciences.

Pakistan has made significant contributions in various scientific fields, with chemistry being particularly strong. The International Center for Chemical and Biological Sciences is a institution in this area, offering one of the largest postgraduate research programs in the country. Other notable fields include physics, material science, metallurgy, biology, and mathematics.

Pakistani scientists have achieved international acclaim in mathematics and several branches of physical science. Professor Abdus Salam, a theoretical physicist, won the Nobel Prize in Physics in 1979, while Professor Atta-ur-Rahman, an organic chemist, was elected a Fellow of the Royal Society in 2006.

In terms of technology, Pakistan has made significant strides in nuclear physics and explosives engineering, primarily driven by security concerns. The country is also involved in space exploration, with a focus on military applications. Pakistan is an associate member of CERN, a prestigious international research organization.

== Overview ==
The Scientific and Technological Research Division (S&TR) was established in 1964 to coordinate and implement national science and technology policy, promote research, and facilitate the utilization of research results and scientific and technological manpower.

Since 1972, the Ministry of Science and Technology (MoST) has been the national focal point for the Government of Pakistan, planning and coordinating scientific and technological programs aligned with the national agenda. Its goal is to build a strong and sustainable research base for socio-economic development. The Ministry promotes technological advancements in industrial development, renewable energy, and rural development to boost growth and improve living standards. Its main focus is on enhancing Pakistan's technological skills, increasing human resources to combat brain drain, and integrating technological infrastructure to strengthen institutions, improve governance of the S&TR, and support local innovation systems.

=== Golden Age ===
Prof. Atta-ur-Rahman FRS receiving UNESCO Science Prize at World Congress on Science in Budapest Hungary (1999)

The 1960s and 1970s marked the initial rise of Pakistan's science, which gained international recognition in various science communities. During this period, scientists contributed significantly to the fields of Natural Product Chemistry, theoretical, particle, mathematical, and nuclear physics, as well as other major and subfields of Chemistry and Physics. The research was spearheaded by scientists such as Riazuddin, Ishfaq Ahmad, Salimuzzaman Siddiqui, Atta-ur-Rahman and Samar Mubarakmand.

The major growth in scientific output occurred after the establishment of the Higher Education Commission, accompanied by a 60-fold increase in funding for science.

The real growth of science in Pakistan occurred under the leadership of Prof. Atta-ur-Rahman during 2000–2008 when he was the Federal Minister of Science & Technology and later Chairman of the Higher Education Commission (HEC). The chairperson of the Senate Standing Committee on Education hailed the first six years of HEC under Prof. Atta-ur-Rahman as "Pakistan's golden period."

Dr. Abdus Salam, the first Pakistani winner of the Nobel Prize in Physics, was the father of physics research in Pakistan. Under his watchful direction, mathematicians and physicists tackled the greatest and outstanding problems in physics and mathematics. From 1960 to 1974, Salam led the research at its peak, prompting international recognition of Pakistani mathematicians and physicists. This allowed them to conduct their research at CERN.

=== State Control ===
Most research programs in Pakistan take place not only at universities but also at specialized research facilities and institutes. Some of these institutes operate under the Ministry of Science and Technology, which oversees scientific development, along with the Pakistan Academy of Sciences and various specialized institutes. The Pakistan Academy of Sciences, established in 1953 and relocated to Islamabad in 1964, focuses primarily on the natural sciences, especially physics. From 1947 to 1971, research was conducted independently, with little government influence.

The High Tension Laboratories (HTL) at Government College University, Lahore, were founded by R. M. Chaudhry with British government funding in the 1950s. In 1967, Professor Abdus Salam established the Institute of Theoretical Physics at Quaid-e-Azam University, along with the Pakistan Institute of Nuclear Science and Technology and the Centre for Nuclear Studies, with support from European countries. However, after Zulfikar Ali Bhutto became president in 1972, he centralized scientific research under his socialist reforms and established the Ministry of Science, appointing Ishrat Hussain Usmani as its head.

During the 1950s and 1960s, both West and East Pakistan had their own academies of science, with East Pakistan dependent on funding from the West. Medical research is managed by the Health Ministry, agricultural research by the Agriculture Ministry, and environmental sciences by the Environment Ministry.

Following the 1971 Indo-Pakistan War, Bhutto increased scientific funding by over 200%, primarily for military research. With Dr. Salam's guidance, Bhutto recruited Pakistani scientists abroad to develop the atomic bomb. This program was initially led by Dr. Salam and later by Dr. Munir Ahmad Khan until 1991. Zia-ul-Haq, who took power in the 1980s, enforced pseudoscience in education and promoted Dr. Abdul Qadeer Khan to export sensitive military technologies to Libya, Iran, and North Korea. Due to government control, much of Pakistan's academic research remains classified and unknown to the international scientific community. There have been numerous failed attempts by foreign powers, including Libya and the CIA, to infiltrate Pakistan's research facilities.

In 2002, the University Grants Commission was replaced by the Higher Education Commission (HEC), tasked with reforming higher education by improving financial incentives, increasing university enrollment and PhD graduates, enhancing foreign scholarships and research collaborations, and providing state-of-the-art ICT facilities. The HEC also upgraded scientific laboratories, rehabilitated educational facilities, and developed a regional digital library. The HEC also provided free high-speed internet access to scientific literature and launched initiatives to create new universities and science parks.

=== Science policy ===
The Federal Ministry of Science and Technology has overseen Pakistan's science and technology sector since 1972. In 2012, the government recognized innovation as a long-term economic growth strategy by formulating the National Science, Technology, and Innovation Policy. Key focuses of the policy include:

- Human resource development
- Endogenous technology development
- Technology transfer
- International cooperation in R&D

By 2014, studies were completed in eleven areas, including agriculture, energy, ICT, and health. After the 2013 government change Ministry of Science and Technology issued the draft National Science, Technology, and Innovation Strategy 2014-2018 . This strategy was integrated into Vision 2025, Pakistan's long-term development plan, with human development as its central pillar.

== Achievements ==
In 1961, Pakistan made international achievements by becoming the third Asian country and the tenth in the world to launch the Rehbar-I—a solid fuel expendable rocket—from Sonmani Spaceport. This rocket was developed and launched under the leadership of Dr. W. J. M. Turowicz, a Polish-Pakistani scientist and project director. Following this launch, the program continued to conduct flights until the 1970s.

A significant breakthrough occurred in 1979 when the Nobel Prize Committee awarded the Nobel Prize in Physics to Abdus Salam for formulating the electroweak theory, which unifies the weak nuclear force and electromagnetic force. In 1990, the Space and Upper Atmosphere Research Commission (SUPARCO) launched Pakistan's first locally designed communication satellite, Badr-1, from the Xichang Satellite Launch Center (XLSC) in the People's Republic of China. With this launch, Pakistan became the first Muslim-majority country to develop an artificial robotic satellite and the second South Asian state to launch a satellite, after India.

One of the most widely reported achievements occurred in 1998 when Pakistan joined the nuclear club. In response to India's nuclear tests on May 11 and May 13, 1998, under the codename Operation Shakti at the Pokhran Test Range (PTR), the Pakistan Atomic Energy Commission (PAEC) conducted five simultaneous nuclear tests at the Chagai Hills on May 28, 1998, under the codename Chagai-I, led by Prime Minister Nawaz Sharif. PAEC conducted another test in the Kharan Desert, known as Chagai-II, resulting in six tests within a week. With these tests, Pakistan became the seventh nuclear power in the world and the only Muslim-majority country to have mastered nuclear technology. On August 13, 2011, SUPARCO launched its first indigenously developed geosynchronous satellite, Paksat-1R, also from XLSC in China.

In 2006, Prof. Atta-ur-Rahman was elected a Fellow of the Royal Society (London), becoming the first scientist from the Muslim world to receive this honor for his research conducted in an Islamic country. He made significant contributions to the development of natural product chemistry, and several international journals have published special issues in recognition of his work.

A landmark study by Thomson Reuters highlighted the impact of the reforms introduced by Atta-ur-Rahman, revealing that the rate of growth of highly cited papers from Pakistan over the past decade was greater than that of Brazil, Russia, India, or China.

Pakistan was ranked 99th in the Global Innovation Index in 2025.

== National Institutions ==
=== Scientific research ===
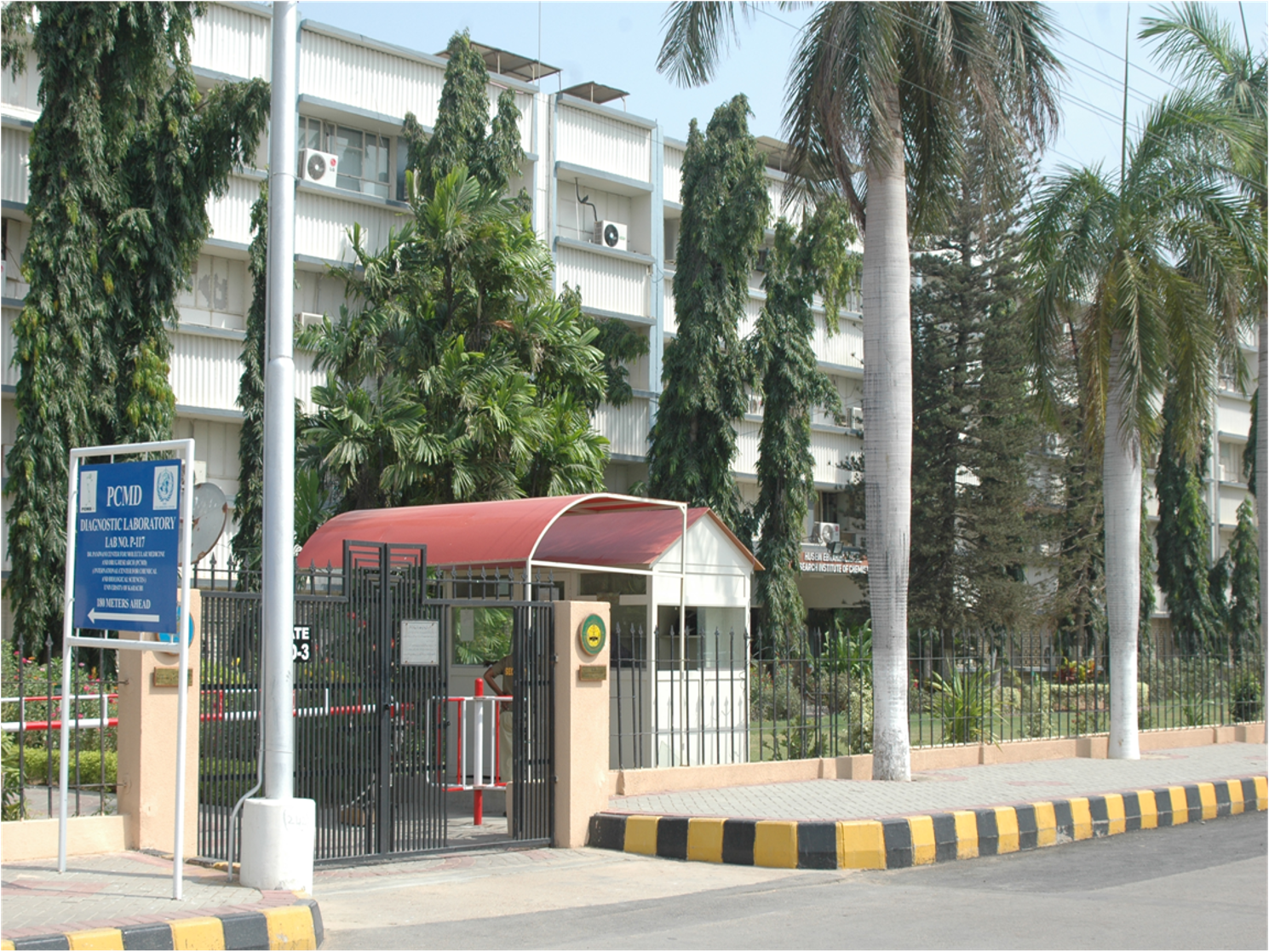
The HEJ Research Institute of Chemistry University of Karachi is an integral part of International Center for Chemical and Biological sciences, the regional UNESCO Center of Excellence.

A large part of research is conducted by science research institutes with semi-controlled by the Government.

- International Center for Chemical and Biological Sciences
- National Centre for Physics
- National Institute for Biotechnology and Genetic Engineering
- Abdus Salam School of Mathematical Sciences
- PU Centre for High Energy Physics
- Institute of Space and Planetary Astrophysics
- National Engineering and Scientific Commission
- Pakistan Institute of Nuclear Science and Technology
- Institute of Space Technology
- Council of Scientific and Industrial Research
- Nuclear Institute for Agriculture and Biology
- Nuclear Institute for Food and Agriculture
- Pakistan Bureau of Statistics

The Dr. Panjwani Center for Molecular Medicine and Drug Research, University of Karachi, is an integral part of International Center for Chemical and Biological sciences, the regional UNESCO Center of Excellence.

=== Science community of Pakistan ===
- Pakistan Academy of Sciences
- Pakistan Association for the Advancement of Science
- NUST Science Society
- Pakistan Mathematical Society
- Pakistan Agricultural Research Council
- Pakistan Institute of Physics
- Pakistan Atomic Energy Commission
- Pakistan Atomic Scientists Society
- Pakistan Nuclear Society
- Pakistan Science Foundation
- Survey of Pakistan
- Geological Survey of Pakistan
- Pakistan Physical Society
- Khwarizmi Science Society
- Pakistan Science Club
- Ghulam Ishaq Khan Institute of Engineering Sciences and Technology
- Shaheed Zulfiqar Ali Bhutto Institute of Science and Technology

== See also ==
- List of Pakistani inventions and discoveries
- List of Pakistani scientists
- Economy of Pakistan

== Sources ==
This article incorporates text from a free content work. Licensed under CC-BY-SA IGO 3.0. Text taken from UNESCO Science Report: towards 2030, UNESCO, UNESCO Publishing.

This article incorporates text from a free content work. Licensed under CC BY-SA 3.0 IGO (license statement/permission). Text taken from UNESCO Science Report: the Race Against Time for Smarter Development, 574–603, UNESCO Publishing.
