= Irshad Hussain =

Pakistani scientist

Irshad Hussain (ارشاد حسین)
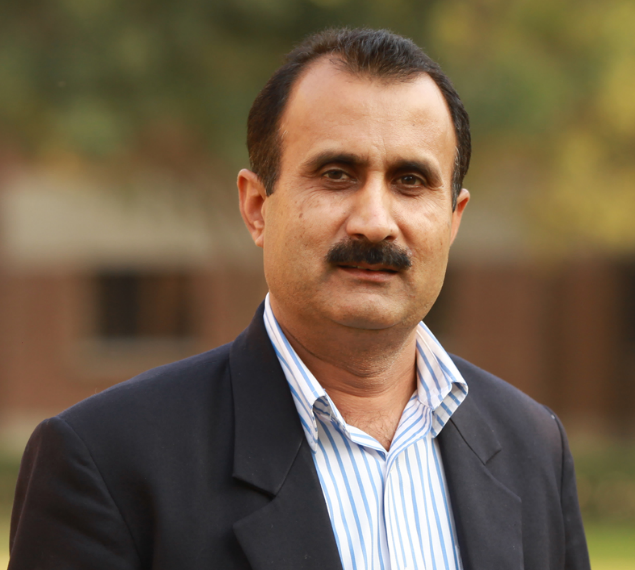
- Born: Jhang, Punjab, Pakistan
- Education: Quaid-i-Azam University, Pakistan, University of Liverpool, UK
- Awards: Gold Medal in Chemistry (2014) by Pakistan Academy of Sciences, Prof. Dr. Atta-ur-Rahman Gold Medal in Chemistry (2007) by Pakistan Academy of Sciences
- Scientific career
- Fields: Chemistry; Materials science and Nanotechnology
- Workplaces: Lahore University of Management Sciences; University of Engineering and Technology, Peshawar; National Institute for Biotechnology and Genetic Engineering; Huazhong University of Science and Technology
- Thesis: Synthesis of metal nanoparticles and their applications in advanced materials fabrication (2005)
- Doctoral advisor: Andrew Ian Cooper and Mathias Brust
- Website: Functional Nanomaterials

Irshad Hussain (Urdu: ارشاد حسین) is a Pakistani scientist in the field of chemistry and among the few pioneers to initiate nanomaterials research in Pakistan.

He is among the founding faculty members of SBA School of Science and Engineering and played a key role in the development of the chemistry department at Lahore University of Management Sciences (during 2010–2016). He is a tenured professor in the department of chemistry and chemical engineering at SBA School of Science and Engineering, Lahore University of Management Sciences, and has previously also served as a professor of renewable energy engineering at the US–Pakistan Center for Advanced Studies in Energy at the University of Engineering and Technology, Peshawar, while on sabbatical leave in 2017. Hussain has also served as the chair of the National Nanotech Experts Panel at Pakistan Council for Science and Technology in 2015 and was awarded gold medals in chemistry by Pakistan Academy of Sciences (PAS) in 2007 (Prof. Atta-ur-Rahman Gold Medal in Chemistry) and 2014 (PAS Gold Medal in Chemistry). Currently, he has led the National Core Group of Nanotechnology under the Prime Minister Task Force on Science and Technology, Govt. of Pakistan (2019-2022), Currently, he is also leading National Nanotech Experts Panel/Group constituted by the Planning Commission, Govt. of Pakistan.

== Early life and education ==
Hussain was born and raised in a remote village Mauza Sadhana, Ahmedpur Sial, of Jhang, Pakistan. He received his early education from Samandoana and Ahmed Pur Sial, District Jhang. Then he moved to Multan and obtained F.Sc. and B.Sc. degree from Government Emerson College Bosan Road Multan. He received his MSc degree in chemistry from Quaid-i-Azam University, Islamabad in 1993, and afterwards worked in the groups of Atta-ur-Rahman and Muhammad Iqbal Choudhary at Hussain Ebrahim Jamal Research Institute of Chemistry, University of Karachi. He joined NIBGE, Faisalabad, in 1997 and during his service at NIBGE, completed PhD (Chemistry) in 2005 from the University of Liverpool, UK, under the supervision of Andrew Ian Cooper and Mathias Brust.

== Career ==
Hussain joined National Institute for Biotechnology and Genetic Engineering, Faisalabad, in 1997 as a Scientific Officer and was promoted to Senior Scientific Officer in 2001. He was the Founding Project Director of a ~US$2.5 Million project to initiate Nanobiotechnology research during 2005–2008. In Feb. 2008, he joined the Chemistry Department at SBA School of Science & Engineering, Lahore University of Management Sciences and led the Chemistry department as chair from 2010 to December 31, 2016. While on sabbatical leave in 2017, Hussain served as a Professor of Renewable Energy Systems at US-Pakistan Center for Advanced Studies in Energy, University of Engineering & Technology, Peshawar, and as a Foreign Professor (Oct. 25 - Nov. 24, 2017) at the School of Chemistry & Chemical Engineering, Huazhong University of Science and Technology, Wuhan, China.

== Research ==
The focus of Hussain's research group is on the synthesis of customized metal/metal oxide nanoparticles/nanoclusters for applications in diverse fields including biomedical sciences, energy technologies, environment and catalysis. He has established his research mark by developing reproducible methods for the synthesis of fairly uniform metal nanoparticles/nanoclusters with controlled size, shape and surface chemistry and using them as building blocks to develop new nanostructured materials with unique chemical and physical properties for applications in biomedical sciences, renewable energy technologies, environment & catalysis. He has published over 80 research articles in prominent journals including Nature Materials, Science Advances, Angewandte Chemie - Int. Ed., Advanced Materials, Journal of the American Chemical Society, Small, ChemCommun, Langmuir, and Nanoscale etc.

== Awards and honours ==
- 2025 - Tang Au-Chin Chair Professor (Flexible) at Jilin University, Changchun, China.
- 2024 - Honored as Distinguished Scientist by the Chinese Academy of Sciences. ()
- 2024 - Advisory Professor, Huazhong University of Science & Technology (HUST), Wuhan, China.
- 2022 - Fellow, International Engineering & Technology Institute (FIETI)
- 2021 - Fellow, Pakistan Academy of Sciences, Pakistan
- 2021 - Fellow, Royal Society of Chemistry, UK (FRSC)
- 2020 - 2022: Chair, National Core Group of Nanotechnology, PM Task Force on Science & Technology (Pakistan)
- 2020 - 2022: Member, National Core Group of Chemistry, PM Task Force on Science & Technology (Pakistan)
- 2006-2019: Research Productivity awards by PCST, Ministry of Science and Technology (Pakistan)
- 2016: Charles Wallace visiting fellow at the University of Cambridge UK
- 2014: Chair of National Nanotech Foresight Committee constituted by Pakistan Council for Science and Technology (PCST)
- 2014: Pakistan Academy of Sciences Gold Medal in Chemistry
- 2013: Fellow of the Chemical Society of Pakistan
- 2007: Prof. Dr. Atta-ur-Rehman Gold Medal in Chemistry by Pakistan Academy of Sciences.
- 2001-2005: PhD fellowship award by Ministry of Science & Technology, Govt. of Pakistan, to study in UK

== Selected publications ==
- 'Porous hypercrosslinked polymer-TiO_{2}-graphene composite photocatalysts for visible-light-driven CO_{2} conversion' Nature Communications, 2019.
- 'Design of polymeric stabilizers for size-controlled synthesis of monodisperse gold nanoparticles in water' Langmuir, 2007.
- 'Aligned two-and three-dimensional structures by directional freezing of polymers and nanoparticles' Nature Materials, 2005.
- 'Size-controlled synthesis of near-monodisperse gold nanoparticles in the 1-4 nm range using polymeric stabilizers' JACS, 2005.
- 'Rational and combinatorial design of peptide capping ligands for gold nanoparticles' JACS, 2004.
- 'Preparation of acrylate-stabilized gold and silver hydrosols and gold-polymer composite films' Langmuir, 2003.
