= National Science Talent Contest =

Annual science competition in Pakistan

Logo of National Science Talent Contest Pakistan (NSTC)

National Science Talent Contest or NSTC is an extension of the National Physics Talent Contest launched by PIEAS in 1995 on the directive of the then President of Pakistan. The program aims to encourage students to pursue careers in science and to prepare them for participation in International Science Olympiads in Physics, Biology, Chemistry and Mathematics.

== Contests ==
=== National Physics Talent Contest (NPTC) ===
National Physics Talent Contest (NPTC) is one of the contests of National Science Talent Contest (NSTC). The top five winners of NPTC represent Pakistan in the International Physics Olympiad.

=== National Biology Talent Contest (NBTC) ===
National Biology Talent Contest (NBTC) is one of the contests of National Science Talent Contest (NSTC). The top four winners of NBTC represent Pakistan in the International Biology Olympiad.

=== National Chemistry Talent Contest (NCTC) ===
National Chemistry Talent Contest (NCTC) is one of the contests of National Science Talent Contest (NSTC). The top five winners of NCTC represent Pakistan in the International Chemistry Olympiad.

=== National Mathematics Talent Contest (NMTC) ===
National Mathematics Talent Contest (NMTC) is one of the contests of National Science Talent Contest (NSTC). The top six winners of NMTC represent Pakistan in International Mathematical Olympiad.

== Eligibility and Participation ==
=== Eligibility ===
- Students of 9th, 10th, & 11th (Matric/O-Levels & Intermediate-I/A-Level-I)
- Aggregate marks of 60% or more core subjects i.e. Physics, Chemistry, Biology, and Mathematics in the last exam
- Age less than 20 years on 30 June of Olympiad year
- Students who are currently studying in Intermediate (Part-II)/ A Levels (Part-II) & university students are NOT eligible to apply.

=== Selection process ===
Candidates must pass a national screening test, typically conducted annually, after which selected students are invited to training camps. Approximately 50 students per subject are shortlisted for these camps (training camp list is arranged by rank), from which a final team of 4–6 students is selected to represent Pakistan at international science olympiads.

Registration for the screening test is conducted through the STEM Careers Programme website.

=== Awards and incentives ===
Participants representing Pakistan in international science olympiads receive monetary awards and additional benefits.

- Gold medal: 500,000 PKR
- Silver medal: 250,000 PKR
- Bronze medal: 100,000 PKR
- Honorable mention: 50,000 PKR
- International participation: 25,000 PKR

In addition to cash prizes, selected participants may receive academic benefits, including admission opportunities at the Pakistan Institute of Engineering and Applied Sciences (PIEAS) without an entrance examination.

== Home Institutions ==
There are different educational institutions allotted for each subcategory of the NSTC, where students are trained and tested and further screened for the subsequent phases of the contest:

- NPTC: Pakistan Institute of Engineering and Applied Sciences (PIEAS), Islamabad
- NBTC: National Institute for Biotechnology and Genetic Engineering (NIBGE), Faisalabad
- NCTC: H.E.J Research Institute of Chemistry, University of Karachi, Karachi
- NMTC: COMSATS University Islamabad (CUI), Lahore

== Achievements ==
=== International Mathematical Olympiad (IMO) ===
Pakistani students have participated in the International Mathematical Olympiad since 2005. Participants are selected through the National Mathematics Talent Contest (NMTC).

Pakistani teams have won multiple bronze medals, 2 silver medals, and several honorable mentions at the IMO.

Achievements in International Mathematical Olympiad
| No | NMTC | IMO | Host | Result |
|---|---|---|---|---|
| 1 | NMTC-01 | 46th IMO (2005) | Mexico | - |
| 2 | NMTC-02 | 47th IMO (2006) | Slovenia | 1 honorable mention |
| 3 | NMTC-03 | 48th IMO (2007) | Vietnam | 1 bronze medal, 1 honorable mention |
| 4 | NMTC-04 | 49th IMO (2008) | Spain | - |
| 5 | NMTC-05 | 50th IMO (2009) | Germany | 1 bronze medal |
| 6 | NMTC-06 | 51st IMO (2010) | Kazakhstan | 1 honorable mention |
| 7 | NMTC-07 | 52nd IMO (2011) | Netherlands | 1 bronze medal, 1 honorable mention |
| 8 | NMTC-08 | 53rd IMO (2012) | Argentina | 1 silver medal, 1 honorable mention |
| 9 | NMTC-09 | 54th IMO (2013) | Colombia | 3 honorable mentions |
| 10 | NMTC-10 | 55th IMO (2014) | South Africa | 1 bronze medal, 1 honorable mention |
| 11 | NMTC-11 | 56th IMO (2015) | Thailand | 1 bronze medal |
| 12 | NMTC-12 | 57th IMO (2016) | Hong Kong | - |
| 13 | NMTC-13 | 58th IMO (2017) | Brazil | 1 bronze medal, 3 honorable mentions |
| 14 | NMTC-14 | 59th IMO (2018) | Romania | 3 honorable mentions |
| 15 | NMTC-15 | 60th IMO (2019) | United Kingdom | 1 bronze medal, 1 honorable mention |
| 16 | NMTC-16 | 61st IMO (2020) | Russia (remote) | 3 honorable mentions |
| 17 | NMTC-17 | 62nd IMO (2021) | Russia (remote) | - |
| 18 | NMTC-18 | 63rd IMO (2022) | Norway | 3 honorable mentions |
| 19 | NMTC-19 | 64th IMO (2023) | Japan | 1 bronze medal, 1 honorable mention |
| 20 | NMTC-20 | 65th IMO (2024) | United Kingdom | 1 silver medal, 1 bronze medal, 1 honorable mention |
| 21 | NMTC-21 | 66th IMO (2025) | Australia | 3 honorable mentions |

=== International Physics Olympiad (IPhO) ===
Pakistani students have been participating regularly in International Physics Olympiad (IPhO) since 2001 with earlier participation as observers. These students are selected through National Physics Talent Contest (NPTC).

Achievements in International Physics Olympiad
| No | NPTC | IPhO | Host | Result |
|---|---|---|---|---|
| 1 | NPTC-05 | 32nd IPhO (2001) | Turkey | 1 honorable mention |
| 2 | NPTC-06 | 33rd IPhO (2002) | Indonesia | 2 bronze medals, 2 honorable mentions |
| 3 | NPTC-07 | 34th IPhO (2003) | Taiwan | 2 bronze medals, 3 honorable mentions |
| 4 | NPTC-08 | 35th IPhO (2004) | South Korea | 3 honorable mentions |
| 5 | NPTC-09 | 36th IPhO (2005) | Spain | 2 honorable mentions |
| 6 | NPTC-10 | 37th IPhO (2006) | Singapore | 1 bronze medal, 1 honorable mention |
| 7 | NPTC-11 | 38th IPhO (2007) | Iran | 2 honorable mentions |
| 8 | NPTC-12 | 39th IPhO (2008) | Vietnam | 1 silver medal, 1 bronze medal, 2 honorable mentions |
| 9 | NPTC-13 | 40th IPhO (2009) | Mexico | 2 bronze medals, 2 honorable mentions |
| 10 | NPTC-14 | 41st IPhO (2010) | Croatia | 3 honorable mentions |
| 11 | NPTC-15 | 42nd IPhO (2011) | Thailand | 2 bronze medals, 2 honorable mentions |
| 12 | NPTC-16 | 43rd IPhO (2012) | Estonia | 1 bronze medal |
| 13 | NPTC-17 | 44th IPhO (2013) | Denmark | - |
| 14 | NPTC-18 | 45th IPhO (2014) | Kazakhstan | - |
| 15 | NPTC-19 | 46th IPhO (2015) | India | 1 bronze medal, 1 honorable mention |
| 16 | NPTC-20 | 47th IPhO (2016) | Switzerland | 1 honorable mention |
| 17 | NPTC-21 | 48th IPhO (2017) | Indonesia | 2 honorable mentions |
| 18 | NPTC-22 | 49th IPhO (2018) | Portugal | - |
| 19 | NPTC-23 | 50th IPhO (2019) | Israel | - |
| 20 | NPTC-24 | 51st IPhO (2020) | International Distributed Physics Olympiad | - |
| 21 | NPTC-25 | 52nd IPhO (2021) | Lithuania | 1 honorable mention |
| 22 | NPTC-26 | 53rd IPhO (2022) | Switzerland | 2 bronze medals, 1 honorable mention |
| 23 | NPTC-27 | 54th IPhO (2023) | Japan | 2 honorable mentions |
| 24 | NPTC-28 | 55th IPhO (2024) | Iran | 3 bronze medals, 1 honorable mention |
| 25 | NPTC-29 | 56th IPhO (2025) | France | 1 bronze medal, 1 honorable mention |

=== International Biology Olympiad (IBO) ===
Pakistani students have been participating regularly in International Biology Olympiad (IBO) since 2006 while earlier participation was as observer. These students are selected through National Biology Talent Contest (NBTC).

Achievements in International Biology Olympiad
| No | NBTC | IBO | Host | Result |
|---|---|---|---|---|
| 1 | NBTC-02 | 17th IBO (2006) | Argentina | 1 bronze medal |
| 2 | NBTC-03 | 18th IBO (2007) | Canada | 1 bronze medal |
| 3 | NBTC-04 | 19th IBO (2008) | India | 1 silver medal |
| 4 | NBTC-05 | 20th IBO (2009) | Japan | 2 bronze medals |
| 5 | NBTC-06 | 21st IBO (2010) | South Korea | 2 bronze medals |
| 6 | NBTC-07 | 22nd IBO (2011) | Taiwan | 4 bronze medals |
| 7 | NBTC-08 | 23rd IBO (2012) | Singapore | 2 bronze medals, 1 honorable mention |
| 8 | NBTC-09 | 24th IBO (2013) | Switzerland | - |
| 9 | NBTC-10 | 25th IBO (2014) | Indonesia | 2 bronze medals, 2 honorable mentions |
| 10 | NBTC-11 | 26th IBO (2015) | Denmark | 1 silver medal, 1 bronze medal, 2 honorable mentions |
| 11 | NBTC-12 | 27th IBO (2016) | Vietnam | 2 bronze medals, 1 honorable mention |
| 12 | NBTC-13 | 28th IBO (2017) | United Kingdom | 2 bronze medals |
| 13 | NBTC-14 | 29th IBO (2018) | Iran | 1 honorable mention |
| 14 | NBTC-15 | 30th IBO (2019) | Hungary | 1 bronze medal, 1 honorable mention |
| 15 | NBTC-16 | 31st IBO (2020) Replaced by IBO Challenge | Japan | - |
| 16 | NBTC-17 | 32nd IBO (2021) Replaced by IBO Challenge II | Portugal | - |
| 17 | NBTC-18 | 33rd IBO (2022) | Armenia | 1 honorable mention |
| 18 | NBTC-19 | 34th IBO (2023) | UAE | 1 bronze medal |
| 19 | NBTC-20 | 35th IBO (2024) | Kazakhstan | 2 bronze medals |
| 20 | NBTC-21 | 36th IBO (2025) | Philippines | 1 gold medal, 1 honorable mention |

=== International Chemistry Olympiad (IChO) ===
Pakistani students have been participating regularly in International Chemistry Olympiads (IChO) since 2006. These students are selected through National Chemistry Talent Contest (NCTC).

Achievements in International Chemistry Olympiad
| No | NCTC | IChO | Host | Result |
|---|---|---|---|---|
| 1 | NCTC-02 | 38th IChO (2006) | Republic of Korea | - |
| 2 | NCTC-03 | 39th IChO (2007) | Russian Federation | 2 bronze medals |
| 3 | NCTC-04 | 40th IChO (2008) | Hungary | 3 bronze medals |
| 4 | NCTC-05 | 41st IChO (2009) | United Kingdom | 2 bronze medals |
| 5 | NCTC-06 | 42nd IChO (2010) | Japan | - |
| 6 | NCTC-07 | 43rd IChO (2011) | Turkey | 2 bronze medals |
| 7 | NCTC-08 | 44th IChO (2012) | USA | 1 bronze medal |
| 8 | NCTC-09 | 45th IChO (2013) | Russian Federation | 3 bronze medals |
| 9 | NCTC-10 | 46th IChO (2014) | Vietnam | 4 bronze medals |
| 10 | NCTC-11 | 47th IChO (2015) | Azerbaijan | 2 bronze medals |
| 11 | NCTC-12 | 48th IChO (2016) | Georgia | 1 bronze medal |
| 12 | NCTC-13 | 49th IChO (2017) | Thailand | 1 bronze medal |
| 13 | NCTC-14 | 50th IChO (2018) | Czech Republic & Slovakia | 1 bronze medal |
| 14 | NCTC-15 | 51st IChO (2019) | France | 1 bronze medal |
| 15 | NCTC-16 | 52nd IChO (2020) | Turkey | - |
| 16 | NCTC-17 | 53rd IChO (2021) | Japan | - |
| 17 | NCTC-18 | 54th IChO (2022) | China | 1 honorable mention |
| 18 | NCTC-19 | 55th IChO (2023) | Switzerland | 1 honorable mention |
| 19 | NCTC-20 | 56th IChO (2024) | Saudi Arabia | 1 bronze medal |
| 20 | NCTC-21 | 57th IChO (2025) | UAE | - |
