= NIFA =

NIFA may refer to:

- National Intercollegiate Flying Association
- Nuclear Institute for Food and Agriculture, of the Pakistan Atomic Energy Commission
- National Institute of Food and Agriculture, of the United States Department of Agriculture
- National Islamic Front of Afghanistan
- National Indigenous Fashion Awards, an Australian fashion awards ceremony
