= Awais Khan =

Awais Khan may refer to:

- Awais Khan (cyclist)
- Awais Khan (plant geneticist)
