= NSTC =

NSTC may refer to:

- National Science and Technology Council (Taiwan) – Statutory agency of the Republic of China
- National Science Talent Contest – Annual science competition in Pakistan
- National Sports Training Center – Sport center in Zuoying, Kaohsiung, Taiwan
- National Science and Technology Council – American government council
- Nova Scotia Teachers College – College in Truro, Nova Scotia, Canada
- Nova Scotia Technical College, now the Technical University of Nova Scotia
- Novi Sad Theological College
- Naval Service Training Command – Echelon III command of the U.S. Navy
