= Khwarizmi Science Society =

- خُوارِزمی سائنس سوسائٹی
- Abbreviation: KSS
- Established: 1997
- Type: Scientific
- Purpose: To further the cause of science in Pakistan
- Headquarters: Lahore
- President: Prof. Dr. Saadat Anwar Siddiqi
- Website: http://www.khwarizmi.org

The Khwarizmi Science Society (KSS) (Urdu: خُوارِزمی سائنس سوسائٹی) is a Pakistan based non-profit science association aimed at furthering a science culture in Pakistan’s educational insitiutions and in the general public.

== History ==
The Khwarizmi Science Society was founded in 1997 by a group of students at the University of Engineering and Technology, Lahore, under the guidance of Prof. Saadat Anwar Siddiqi. Initially started as a university-wide science club, the KSS has gradually evolved into one of the most active science societies in Pakistan. The KSS rose to prominence with its range of activities planned around and after International Year of Astronomy 2009 and an international symposium on Science and the Muslim Civilisation in 2007 with Prof. George Saliba as the keynote speaker. Since 2017, it has started annual science show, formally known as Lahore Science Mela, attracting thousands of school children and members of the general public.

== Campaigns ==
One of its main focus areas is to partner with national and international organizations and institutions to run on-ground science awareness and motivation campaigns. Activities organized around the International Year of Astronomy inspired thousands of students around the country and the impact was acknowledged both home and abroad. Currently it is running a nationwide science awareness movement in partnership with Alif Ailaan reaching out to public and private schools in remote areas of Pakistan.

== Lahore Science Mela ==
The Lahore Science Mela (LSM) is an annual event of KSS organized in Lahore, featuring science exhibits, live experiments, science games, and technological demonstrations for children and students of all ages and general public. In addition to the demonstrations and stalls by the society volunteers, many national and international scientific and technological organizations bring their public engaging exhibits. Lahore Astronomical Society, Isfahan Mathematics House, and CERN Media Lab are among the organization which have participated.

== See also ==
- Science and technology in Pakistan
- Alif Ailaan
