= Alif Ailaan =

Pakistani Nonprofit Organization

- الف اعلان
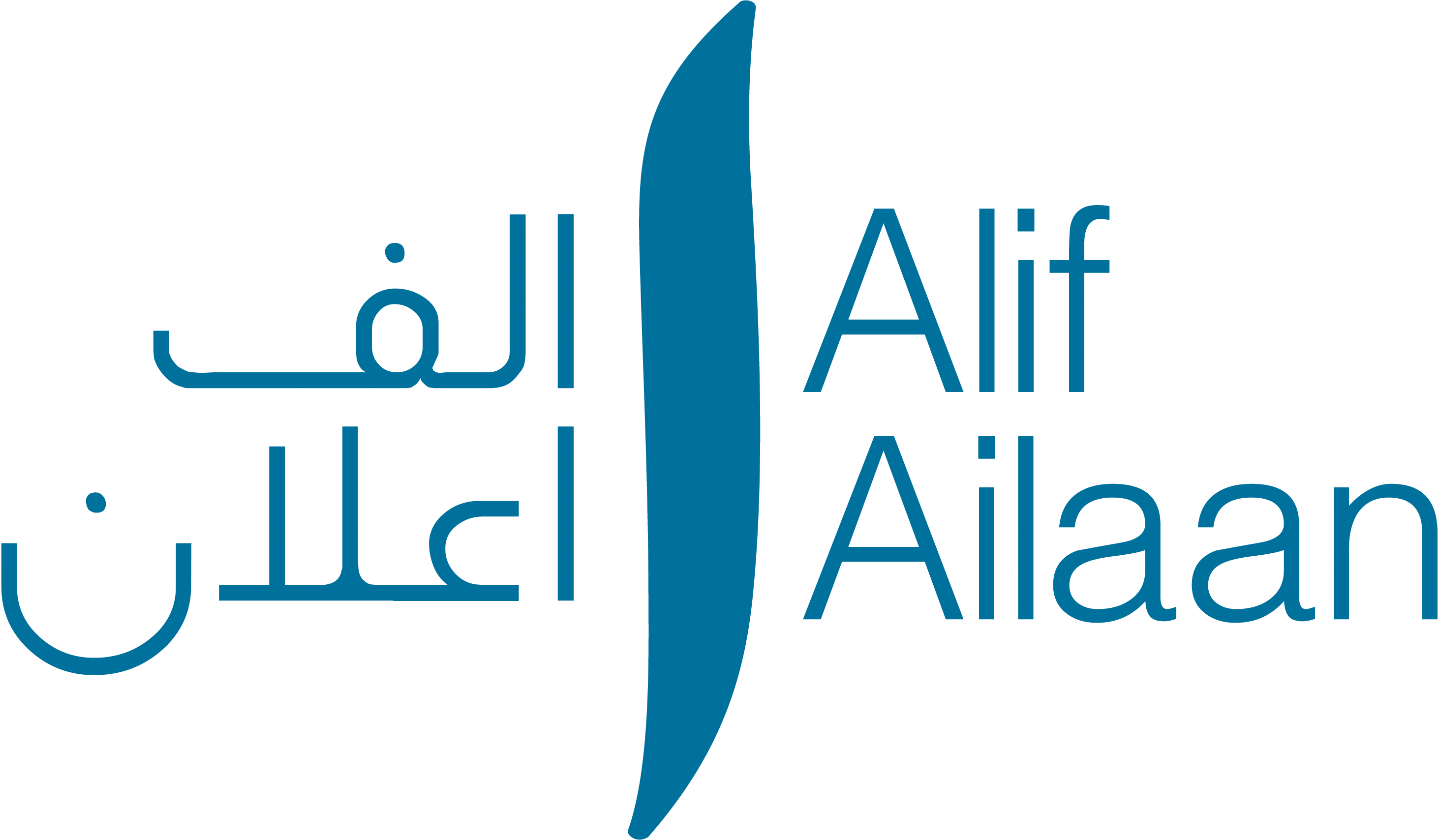
- Formation: 2013
- Defunct: 2018
- Type: Nonprofit
- Headquarters: Islamabad, Pakistan
- Director: Mosharraf Zaidi
- Website: www.alifailaan.pk

Alif Ailaan (Urdu: الف اعلان) was a nonprofit organization working in the field of education in Pakistan from 2013 to 2018. Launched by a team of media and communications specialists, the program aimed to prioritize education in Pakistan and raise awareness among the masses about the importance of education.

It ran campaigns in print, on radio and television, and on social media for the awareness of the masses about education. The program conducts seminars and surveys and publishes the highly-cited district education rankings report. It also monitored the performance of parliamentarians in reforming education in their constituencies.

Working in the four provinces of Pakistan as well as Azad Kashmir, Gilgit-Baltistan, and the formerly Federally Administered Tribal Areas, Alif Ailaan identified the weak spots in education through research and aimed to assist decision makers in creating and implementing better education policies.

== Contributions ==
Alif Ailaan addressed the educational crisis in Pakistan and suggested measures to reform the education landscape. Through their research and data compilation, they assisted decision makers to come up with. Funded by the United Kingdom's Department for International Development, the organization also provided grant support to civil society organisations working for educational reforms and fund research on issues related to education in Pakistan.

== District Education Rankings ==
Alif Ailaan also released annual District Education Rankings for all districts of Pakistan on the basis of its research. The research examined the state of education in the country's 148 districts and agencies and identified the weak spots in education.

=== 2013 ===
According to District Education Rankings 2013, Punjab and Balochistan were the top and bottom-ranked provinces respectively. Poonch was the highest-ranked district in the country, scoring 82.94 points out of a maximum of 100. No districts of the Sindh could find a place among top 50, while only 98 out of the total 145 districts scored above 50.

Top 10 Districts (2013)
Rank	District	Province
1	Poonch	Azad Kashmir
2	Islamabad	Islamabad Capital Territory
3	Chakwal	Punjab
4	Sialkot	Punjab
5	Rawalpindi	Punjab
6	Jhelum	Punjab
7	Narowal	Punjab
8	Lahore	Punjab
9	Hunza–Nagar	Gilgit-Baltistan
10	Haripur	Khyber Pakhtunkhwa

Education index (2013)
Rank	Province	Score
1	Azad Kashmir	77.96
2	Punjab	68.78
3	Gilgit-Baltistan	67.45
4	Khyber Pakhtunkhwa	63.79
5	Sindh	51.67
6	Federally Administered Tribal Areas	47.42
7	Balochistan	46.70

School index (2013)
Rank	Province	Score
1	Punjab	83.47
2	Sindh	66.70
3	Khyber Pakhtunkhwa	66.18
4	Federally Administered Tribal Areas	35.17
5	Balochistan	26.61
6	Gilgit-Baltistan	26.22
7	Azad Kashmir	23.60

=== 2014 ===
The 2014 District Education Rankings of 146 districts of Pakistan showed that Islamabad was the best-performing region in terms of overall standards of education, followed by districts of Punjab and Azad Jammu and Kashmir (AJK).

=== 2015 ===
The 2015 District Education Ranking showed poor performance of Sindh while the performance of Khyber Pakhtunkhwa for improving its enrollment, retention and gender parity indicators was lauded. Rawalpindi District was on top of the ranking.

== Performance of parliamentarians in education sector ==
Alif Ailaan also gauged the performance of every Member of the National Assembly on the basis of educational performance in their respective constituencies. They were assessed against four indicators for education – gender parity, physical facilities, student–teacher ratio and retention.

== See also ==
- Pakistan District Education Rankings
- Khwarizmi Science Society
- The Citizens Foundation
