= Chemical Society of Pakistan =

Chemical Society of Pakistan Pakistan Chemistry Society
- Abbreviation: CSP
- Predecessor: None
- Formation: 1978; 48 years ago
- Type: Scientific think tank
- Headquarters: H.E.J. Research Institute of Chemistry
- Location: Karachi, Sindh Province
- Region served: South Asia; Europe; United States
- Official language: English; Urdu
- President: Prof. Dr. Din Mohammad
- Editor-in-Chief: Dr. M. Raza Shah
- Affiliations: American Chemical Society; International Union of Pure and Applied Chemistry

The Chemical Society of Pakistan, also known as Pakistan Chemistry Society, is an academic and scientific society of professional chemists, devoted and dedicated for scientific inquiry in the field of chemistry. It is one of the largest learned societies of Pakistan and groups together all degree-levels in all fields of chemistry, chemical engineering, and related fields such as biochemistry, Chemical physics, Mathematical chemistry, Electrochemistry and other branches of chemistry.

The Chemical Society was established and launched in 1978, after a series of chemical publications were published through the HEJ Research Institute of Chemistry, at the Karachi University. It publishes its own bimonthly journal, the Journal of the Chemical Society of Pakistan.

== Notable members ==
- Salimuzzaman Siddiqui†— Life member and founding member of the society.
- Atta-ur-Rahman, life member and founder.
- M. Iqbal Choudhry, life member and fellow.
- Irshad Hussain life member and fellow
- Mashooda Hassan, life member and fellow.
- Khairat Mohammad Ibne-Rasa, member and researcher.
- Muhammad Zafar Iqbal, fellow and researcher.
- Mu Shik John, life member and fellow.
- Bina Shaheen Siddiqui, fellow
- Prof. Dr. M. Raza Shah, life member and Editor Journal of the Chemical Society of Pakistan, Fellow Pakistan Academy of Sciences, Fellow Islamic World Academy of Sciences, Fellow the Chemical Society of Pakistan, Fellow International Union of Pure and Applied Chemistry.
