= Pakistan Science Club =

Youth organization in Pakistan

Pakistan Science club
- پاکستان سائنس کلب
- Abbreviation: PSC
- Established: 2008
- Type: Scientific
- Purpose: Promotion of science and technology education among youth
- Headquarters: Karachi
- President: Abdul Rauf
- Website: http://www.paksc.org

Pakistan Science Club (PSC) (Urdu: پاکستان سائنس کلب) is a youth organization in Pakistan that engages students on various scientific activities aimed at promoting scientific and technological knowledge amongst the country's young generation.

Based in Karachi, capital of the Sindh province, the organization runs various seminars and organized activities and, more recently, arranged summer camps in such activities. The club has more recently been engaging in activities in collaboration with other science clubs such as the Karachi astronomy club. PSC has also participated in international science events such as the World Science Day for Peace and Development. PSC is also member of International Federation of Inventors Associations: IFIA .

== See also ==
- Science and technology in Pakistan
