= Qasim Mehdi =

Pakistani molecular biologist (1941–2016)

S. Qasim Mehdi
- Born: 13 February 1941
- Died: 28 September 2016 (aged 75)
- Citizenship: Pakistan
- Education: Lucknow University (BS); Massachusetts Institute of Technology (MS); Oxford University (PhD)
- Known for: Molecular biology; Human genetics
- Awards: Hilal-e-Imtiaz Sitara-e-Imtiaz
- Scientific career
- Fields: Molecular biology, Genetics
- Workplaces: Stanford University; Oxford University; Free University of Berlin; Massachusetts Institute of Technology; Sindh Institute of Urology and Transplantation; Biomedical & Genetic Engineering Division, Pakistan
- Thesis: Synthesis and Control of Bacterial Ribonucleic Acids (1969)

Syed Qasim Mehdi (13 February 1941 – 28 September 2016) was a Pakistani molecular biologist who worked in population genetics. He was a founding member of the Human Genome Diversity Project (HGDP) with prominent role in the initiation of this project at the Stanford University.

== Biography ==
Mehdi was born in Lucknow, India, where he completed his B.S. from the Lucknow University. He received his MS from MIT and then a D.Phil. (doctorate) degree from the Oxford University, where he had mentors like Nobel laureates Sir Hans Krebs and Rodney Porter. His doctoral education was followed by a series of fellowships at the Oxford and the Wellcome Trust, until appointed by the Stanford University as a research associate in 1976 and later a senior research fellow, affiliated with the Stanford University Departments of Chemistry and Radiology and Stanford Cancer Biology Research Labs. He has been fellow of the Wellcome Trust (1972–1974) and the Biochemical Society, UK (1972–1997), other than holding numerous other honors, awards, and fellowships.

His last appointment was serving as the chairman of the Center for Human Genetics at the Sindh Institute of Urology and Transplantation, Karachi, Pakistan, as well as a distinguished visiting professor in the University of Karachi, Karachi Pakistan. In past, he had served as a Distinguished National Professor, Higher Education Commission Pakistan, and director general of the Biomedical & Genetic Engineering Division, Islamabad, at the Institute for Biotechnology & Genetic Engineering, University of Karachi, Pakistan. He was a recipient of the Government of Pakistan civil awards, Sitara-e-Imtiaz (1998) and Hilal-e-Imtiaz, the "Crescent of Distinction" (2003) conferred by the president of Pakistan.

He had been a member of the American Association for the Advancement of Science, the New York Academy of Sciences, Prime Ministers Cabinet Committee for the Evaluation of Research, Development in Science and Technology in Pakistan, Advanced Studies Board, HEJ Research Inst. of Chemistry, Karachi University, 1993-, The World Bank Committee for Higher Education in Pakistan, elected member, Scientific and Medical Advisory Board, the International Retinitis Pigmentosa Society (Retinitis Pigmentosa International) and The Foundation Fighting Blindness society, Washington DC (1993–present), Human Genome Organization (HUGO), London (UK), founding member, Human Genome Diversity Project (HGDP) USA. (1994–present), chairman, Southwest Asia Committee and Member International Executive Committee, HGDP and (1997–present), among a number of other professional bodies.

During his last years, he had been working on charting a direction for the future of biomedical research in Pakistan.

Other than his role in HGDP, he is known for his groundbreaking work on the genetics of human populations, especially on research work related to the human features of Light skin and Dark skin, where he and his team made important contributions (ref.: see Light skin and Dark skin pages citing his work). He has written over two hundred publications, including papers in Science, Nature Genetics and Genome Research. As per google scholar, his publications have accrued a total number of 7745 citations, his scholarly indices include an h-index of 38 and I10-index of 67.

Mehdi died peacefully in Lahore on 28 September 2016 after a protracted illness.

== Fellowships ==
- Wellcome Trust
- Biochemical Society
- Third World Academy of Sciences
- Pakistan Academy of Sciences
- Islamic Academy of Sciences
- Chemical Society of Pakistan

== Selected publications ==
- Underhill, Peter A.; Shen, Peidong; Lin, Alice A.; Jin, Li; Passarino, Giuseppe; Yang, Wei H.; Kauffman, Erin; Bonné-Tamir, Batsheva; Bertranpetit, Jaume; Francalacci, Paolo; others (1 January 2000). "Y chromosome sequence variation and the history of human populations". Nature Genetics. 26 (3): 358–361. doi:10.1038/81685. PMID 11062480. S2CID 12893406.
- Underhill, Peter A.; Jin, Li; Lin, Alice A.; Mehdi, S. Qasim; Jenkins, Trefor; Vollrath, Douglas; Davis, Ronald W.; Cavalli-Sforza, L. Luca; Oefner, Peter J. (1 January 1997). "Detection of numerous Y chromosome biallelic polymorphisms by denaturing high-performance liquid chromatography". Genome Research. 7 (10): 996–1005. doi:10.1101/gr.7.10.996. PMC 310671. PMID 9331370.
- Cann, Howard M.; De Toma, Claudia; Cazes, Lucien; Legrand, Marie-Fernande; Morel, Valerie; Piouffre, Laurence; Bodmer, Julia; Bodmer, Walter F.; Bonne-Tamir, Batsheva; Cambon-Thomsen, Anne; others (1 January 2002). "A human genome diversity cell line panel". Science. 296 (5566): 261–2. doi:10.1126/science.296.5566.261b. PMID 11954565. S2CID 41595131.
- Pagani, Luca; Kivisild, Toomas; Tarekegn, Ayele; Ekong, Rosemary; Plaster, Chris; Gallego Romero, Irene; Ayub, Qasim; Mehdi, S. Qasim; Thomas, Mark G.; Luiselli, Donata; Bekele, Endashaw; Bradman, Neil; Balding, David J.; Tyler-Smith, Chris (2012). "Ethiopian Genetic Diversity Reveals Linguistic Stratification and Complex Influences on the Ethiopian Gene Pool". The American Journal of Human Genetics. 91 (1): 83–96. doi:10.1016/j.ajhg.2012.05.015. PMC 3397267. PMID 22726845.
- Quintana-Murci, Lluís; Chaix, Raphaëlle; Wells, R. Spencer; Behar, Doron M.; Sayar, Hamid; Scozzari, Rosaria; Rengo, Chiara; Al-Zahery, Nadia; Semino, Ornella; Santachiara-Benerecetti, A. Silvana; Coppa, Alfredo; Ayub, Qasim; Mohyuddin, Aisha; Tyler-Smith, Chris; Qasim Mehdi, S.; Torroni, Antonio; McElreavey, Ken (1 May 2004). "Where West Meets East: The Complex mtDNA Landscape of the Southwest and Central Asian Corridor". The American Journal of Human Genetics. 74 (5): 827–845. doi:10.1086/383236. PMC 1181978. PMID 15077202.
