= Nuclear Institute for Agriculture and Biology =

Pakistani food irradiation research institute

- Abbreviation: NIAB
- Formation: April 6, 1972; 54 years ago
- Type: Industrial and scientific research
- Legal status: Institute
- Purpose: Agriculture industrialization and food irradiation
- Headquarters: Location
- Location: Faisalabad, Punjab, Pakistan
- Official language: English and Urdu
- Director: Dr. Tariq Mahmood
- Parent organization: Pakistan Atomic Energy Commission
- Affiliations: Pakistan Atomic Energy Commission
- Website: www.niab.org.pk

The Nuclear Institute for Agriculture and Biology, also known as NIAB, (Urdu: جوہری ادارہ برائے زراعت و حیاتیات) is a Pakistani agriculture and food irradiation national research institute managed by the Pakistan Atomic Energy Commission (PAEC). It is located in Faisalabad, Punjab. Along with the Nuclear Institute for Food and Agriculture (NIFA), the NIAB reports directly to the Islamabad-based PAEC Biological Science Directorate. The current director is Dr. Muhammad Hamed.

== History ==
The NIAB was established by Ishrat Hussain Usmani when PAEC established its first Biological Science Directorate in 1965. In 1967, with the efforts led by Dr. Abdus Salam, the Government of Pakistan approved a project, and the PAEC began its construction. The operations and research began in 1970, and it was officially inaugurated by Munir Ahmad Khan, then Chairman of the PAEC, on 6 April 1972. Khan later developed the institute and led the research activities in the institution. The nuclear medical research was also put under Khan, and NIAB had developed 23 different crop varieties that are high yielding, disease resistant and are being cultivated throughout the country.

== Facilities ==
The institute currently operates ^{60}Co irradiation sources, gas chromatographs, a photo-documentation system, and atomic absorption.

== See also ==
- Pakistan Atomic Energy Commission
- Nuclear Institute for Food and Agriculture
- International Atomic Energy Agency
