= Mosharraf Zaidi =

Pakistani writer and policy advisor

- Education: Lahore University of Management Sciences; Baruch College at City University of New York
- Occupations: Newspaper and TV Analyst and Policy development adviser
- Honours: Young Global Leaders

Mosharraf Zaidi is a Pakistani writer who writes a weekly column for The News International. Previously, he served as a Policy Advisor to the Ministry of Foreign Affairs between 2011 and 2013 under Hina Rabbani Khar, the former Foreign Minister of Pakistan.

== Early life and education ==
Zaidi was born in Hyderabad, Sindh in an Urdu-speaking Muhajir family. He completed his B.Sc. (Hons) degree in Economics from the Lahore University of Management Sciences, Pakistan in 1997. He then went to Baruch College of the City University of New York in 1999 and completed his Master's degree in Public Administration (MPA) in 2001.

== Career ==
Zaidi's work and analysis covers areas such as education, public policy, emergency relief and reconstruction, telecommunications, technology, trade, and public safety improvement in major cities of Pakistan.

From 2005 to 2008 he worked as a Governance Adviser for the Department for International Development, and was the team leader for the 2008 UN evaluation program in Afghanistan. He served as the principal Policy Advisor at Pakistan’s Ministry of Foreign Affairs from 2011 to 2013, where he helped establish the Public Diplomacy division in 2012.

From 2013 to August 2018, he led the Alif Ailaan campaign in Pakistan. The campaign was funded by the Department for International Development and worked towards addressing the education crisis in Pakistan.

In 2014, he was recognized as a Young Global Leader by the World Economic Forum for leading a global campaign aimed towards improving the quality of education for children in Pakistan.

He has written columns for a number of different newspapers in Pakistan, the United States and the Middle East. He is also widely known for being a vocal critic of the Pakistani government's policies on educational reform and frequently makes recommendations, as a TV and newspaper journalist, to improve public safety in the major cities of Pakistan.
