= Journal of the Chemical Society of Pakistan =

- Discipline: Chemistry
- Language: English
- Edited by: Muhammad Iqbal Bhanger

Publication details
- History: 1978–present
- Publisher: Chemical Society of Pakistan (Pakistan)
- Frequency: Bimonthly

Standard abbreviations
- ISO 4: J. Chem. Soc. Pak.

Indexing
- CODEN: JCSPDF
- ISSN: 0253-5106
- LCCN: 80646744
- OCLC no.: 6571343

Links
- Journal homepage; Online access; Online archive

The Journal of the Chemical Society of Pakistan is a bimonthly peer-reviewed scientific journal covering the field of chemistry. It is published by the Chemical Society of Pakistan and was established in 1978. The editor-in-chief is Muhammad Iqbal Bhanger (University of Karachi). The journal is abstracted and indexed in the Science Citation Index Expanded and Current Contents/Physical, Chemical & Earth Sciences.
