= Muhammad Yar Khuhawar =

Pakistani analytical chemist (born 1948)

- Born: 5 February 1948 (age 78); Shahdadkot, Sindh, Pakistan
- Citizenship: Pakistan
- Education: University of Birmingham
- Known for: his work on PUREX Process, and FLiNaK Chemistry
- Awards: Izaz-e-kamal, Sitara-i-Imtiaz
- Scientific career
- Fields: Organic Chemistry, Analytical Chemistry
- Workplaces: University of Sindh

Muhammad Yar Khuhawar is a Pakistani analytical chemist and professor emeritus at the Institute of Advanced Research Studies in Chemical Sciences, High Tech Central Resource Laboratory, Dr. M. A. Kazi Institute of Chemistry, University of Sindh, Jamshoro.

He is working with more than 50 researchers, focusing on the field of chromatography and electrophoresis for analytical method development for metals, non-metals and biological active compounds from a wide variety of samples. His research group has synthesized a number of Schiff base polymers and has developed a new stationary phase for Gas Chromatography and sensitive Liquid Chromatography procedures for the determination of pesticide malathion.

He has published a number of research papers in the field of environmental monitoring of water resources of the Sindh province including: Indus River, canals, lakes, natural springs, sea, underground water resources, municipal sewerage and receiving bodies in terms of pollution and utilities for biological life inhabiting the area.

He has a Ph.D. in Chemistry from Birmingham University, United Kingdom, and was awarded a degree of Doctor of Science (D.Sc.) from University of Birmingham, in 2000. He has more than 250 research publications in national and international journals.
