= Salimuzzaman Siddiqui =

Pakistani organic chemist (1897–1994)

- Born: 19 October 1897; Subeha, North-Western Provinces, British India
- Died: 14 April 1994 (aged 96); Karachi, Sindh, Pakistan
- Citizenship: Pakistani
- Education: Aligarh Muslim University; University College London; Frankfurt University
- Known for: Research in Natural products Chemical constituents of neem
- Spouse: Ethel Wilhelmina Schneeman
- Awards: Fellow of the Royal Society; Hilal-e-Imtiaz; MBE; Pride of Performance; Sitara-e-Imtiaz; Tamgha-e-Pakistan
- Scientific career
- Fields: Organic chemistry
- Workplaces: Pakistan Atomic Energy Commission (PAEC); Pakistan Council of Scientific and Industrial Research (PCSI); H.E.J Institute of Chemistry; Karachi University; Pakistan Academy of Sciences Chemical Society of Pakistan
- Doctoral advisor: Julius von Braun

Salimuzzaman Siddiqui, HI, MBE, SI, FPAS, FRS (Urdu: سلیم الزّماں صدّیقی [səˈliːmʊzːəmaːn sɪˈd̪ːiːqi]; 19 October 1897 – 14 April 1994) was a Pakistani organic chemist specialising in natural products, and a professor of chemistry at the University of Karachi.

Siddiqui studied philosophy at Aligarh Muslim University and later studied chemistry at Frankfurt University, where he received his PhD in 1927. Upon returning to British India, he worked at the Tibbia College Delhi and the Indian Council for Scientific and Industrial Research. He later migrated to Pakistan and worked in the Pakistan Council of Scientific and Industrial Research. He went on to establish the Pakistan National Science Council and was appointed its first chairman in 1961. In the same year he became a Fellow of the Royal Society. He later co-founded the Pakistan Academy of Sciences, and after retirement from his government job, he founded the Hussain Ebrahim Jamal Research Institute of Chemistry.

Siddiqui is credited with pioneering the isolation of unique chemical compounds from the neem (Azadirachta indica), Rauvolfia, and various other flora. As the founder director of H.E.J. Research Institute of Chemistry, he revolutionised research of the pharmacology of various domestic plants found in South Asia to extract novel chemical substances of medicinal importance. Siddiqui published more than 300 research papers and obtained 40 patents mainly in the field of natural product chemistry. In addition to his scientific talents, Siddiqui was also an avid painter, poet, and a connoisseur of Western music. His paintings were exhibited in the United States, Germany, India, and Pakistan.

== Early life ==
Salimuzzaman was born in Subeha (Barabanki District) near Lucknow on 19 October 1897. His father's name was Chaudhry Muhammad Zaman and his elder brother Chaudhry Khaliquzzaman was a distinguished All India Muslim League leader and one of the founding fathers of Pakistan. He received his early education from Lucknow, both in the Urdu and Persian languages, and soon developed interest in literature, poetry, and calligraphy from his father Sheikh Muhammad Zaman. He graduated in Philosophy and Persian language, from Muhammadan Anglo-Oriental College (that would later become Aligarh Muslim University) in 1920.

In 1920, Siddiqui proceeded to University College London to study medicine. However, after one year of pre-medical studies, he moved to Frankfurt University in 1921 to study chemistry. In 1924, he married his German classmate, Ethel Wilhelmina Schneeman. He received Doctor of Philosophy under the supervision of Julius Von Braun in 1927. During his college days in Germany in the 1920s, Germany experienced high inflation and he went through some hard economic times. In these tough times, India's then eminent philanthropist Hakim Ajmal Khan used to send him Rupees400 every month. Many years later, as a successful scientist in Pakistan, Siddiqui repaid Hakeem Ajmal Khan's kindness by dedicating his discoveries to him.

On his return, he established the Ayurvedic and Unani Tibbi Research Institute at the Tibbia College Delhi, under the guidance of Hakim Ajmal Khan. He was appointed its first director. However, soon after the death of Hakim Ajmal Khan, Siddiqui left the post. In 1940, he joined Indian Council for Scientific and Industrial Research where he worked until 1951 when he migrated to Pakistan on the request of Prime Minister Liaquat Ali Khan.

== Pioneering research ==
Siddiqui's first breakthrough in research came when he successfully isolated an antiarrhythmic agent in 1931 from the roots of Rauvolfia serpentina. He named the newly discovered chemical compound as Ajmaline, after his mentor Hakim Ajmal Khan who was one of the illustrious practitioners of Unani system of medicine in South Asia. Later on, Siddiqui also extracted other alkaloids from Rauvolfia serpentina that included Ajmalinine, Ajmalicine (C_{21}H_{24}N_{2}O_{3}), Isoajmaline, Neoajmaline, Serpentine and Serpentinine. Many of these are still used worldwide for treatment of mental disorders and cardiovascular ailments, especially as antiarrhythmic agents in Brugada syndrome.

=== Discoveries from neem ===
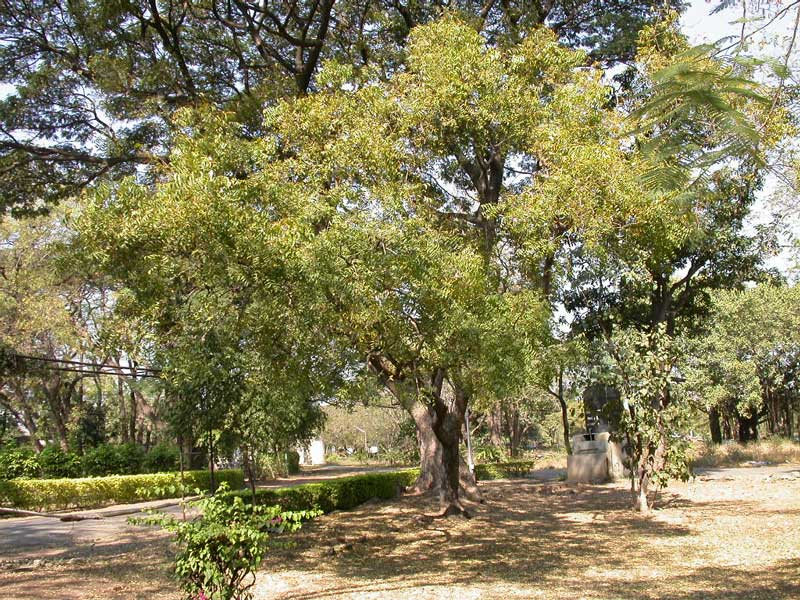
An average neem tree is 15 meters high with the crown's diameter up to 15–20-meter

Siddiqui was the first scientist to bring the anthelmintic, antifungal, antibacterial, and antiviral constituents of the neem tree to the attention of natural products chemists. In 1942, he extracted three bitter compounds from neem oil, which he named as nimbin, nimbinin, and nimbidin respectively. The process involved extracting the water-insoluble components with ether, petrol ether, ethyl acetate and dilute alcohol. The provisional naming was nimbin (sulphur-free crystalline product with melting point at 205 °C, empirical composition C_{7}H_{10}O_{2}), nimbinin (with similar principle, melting at 192 °C), and nimbidin (cream-coloured containing amorphous sulphur, melting at 90–100 °C). Siddiqui identified nimbidin as the main active antibacterial ingredient, and the highest yielding bitter component in the neem oil. These compounds are stable and found in substantial quantities in the neem. They also serve as natural insecticides.

In acknowledgement of these revolutionary discoveries, he was awarded the Order of the British Empire in 1946.

In his later career, Siddiqui continued to discover and isolate numerous unique anti-bacterial compounds from various parts (leaves, bark, etc.) of the neem and other plants. He had more than 50 chemical compounds patented in his name in addition to those discovered as a result of his joint research with other colleagues and students. Most of these discoveries still remain vital natural ingredients of various medicines as well as biopesticides.

== Research leadership ==
Siddiqui migrated to Pakistan in 1951, four years after the emergence of Pakistan in 1947, after being offered and appointed as "science advisor" to the government by Prime minister Liaquat Ali Khan. He was appointed as Director of the Pakistan Department of Research that was reformulated in 1953 as Pakistan Council of Scientific and Industrial Research (PCSIR). The aim of PCSIR was to support the industrial infrastructure through research and development. The regional laboratories of the institution were located in Dhaka, Rajshahi and Chittagong (East Pakistan), and in Lahore and Peshawar (West Pakistan). In 1953, he founded the Pakistan Academy of Sciences as a non-political think tank of distinguished scientists in the country. In 1956, when Government of Pakistan established Pakistan Atomic Energy Commission (PAEC) as an atomic research agency, Siddiqui was designated as its technical member.

In recognition of his scientific leadership, Frankfurt University granted him the degree of D.Med. Honoris causa in 1958. Also in 1958, the Government of Pakistan awarded him with Tamgha-e-Pakistan. In 1960, he became the President of Pan-Indian Ocean Science Association. The same year, he was elected Fellow of the Royal Society. In 1962, he was awarded the Sitara-e-Imtiaz for distinguished merit in the fields of science and medicine. Siddiqui remained the director and chairman of PCSIR until the time of his retirement in 1966. In that year, the President of Pakistan awarded him the Pride of Performance Medal for the respectable completion of his service. In 1967, Siddiqui was invited by University of Karachi to set up a Postgraduate Institute of Chemistry in affiliation with the Department of Chemistry. He was designated as the institute's Founder Director, whereas the additional research staff was provided by PCSIR.

In 1976, the institute was offered a generous donation from Hussain Jamal Foundation. In appreciation of this donation, the institute was renamed as Hussain Ebrahim Jamal Research Institute of Chemistry. In due time, Siddiqui transformed the institute into a distinguished centre of international excellence in the field of chemistry and natural products. In March 1975, he headed the National Commission for Indigenous Medicines His tireless efforts for the promotion of science and technology earned him Hilal-e-Imtiaz by the Government of Pakistan in 1980. In 1983, he played a major role in the establishment of the Third World Academy of Sciences and became its Founding Fellow. He remained the director of the Hussain Ebrahim Jamal Research Institute of Chemistry until 1990. Later on, he continued research in his personal laboratory. He published over 400 research papers and was granted 50 patents.

== Death and legacy ==
Siddiqui died on 14 April 1994 due to cardiac arrest after a brief illness in Karachi. He was buried in the Karachi University Graveyard. Despite his death, the academic and research institutes that he founded during more than 65 years of his research career are still contributing to the international level research in natural products chemistry.

As a person of multiple talents, Siddiqui was also a refined poet, musician, and a painter. In August 1924, he held his first international exhibition of paintings in Frankfurt. Later in 1927, his works of art were exhibited at the Uzielli Gallery, Frankfurt. During his stay in Germany, he also translated Rainer Maria Rilke's poetry into Urdu, which was published in the journal of Jamia Millia Islamia. Though, his passion for arts was superseded by the enthusiasm in scientific research, he continued to patronise arts and culture. In 1966, he was at the forefront for setting up the Central Institute of Arts and Crafts in Karachi. He also compiled a selection of poetry of Mir Taqi Mir into Intekhab-e-Meer. In 1983, he published a portfolio collection of charcoal drawings from 1920 to 1950s.

On 14 April 1999, the Pakistan Post, as part of its 'Scientists of Pakistan' series, issued a commemorative stamp to honour the contributions and services of Siddiqui. In the same year, the street leading to PCSIR Laboratories Complex in Karachi was named as Shahrah-e-Dr. Salim-uz-Zaman Siddiqui. Siddiqui was also remembered by his students and colleagues, many of whom continued to dedicate their international research and publications to his memory. In 2002, a research article was published in the journal Tetrahedron in which, authors Faizi and Naz dedicated their break-through research to the memory of Siddiqui, their mentor.

== Awards and honours ==
Siddiqui was a founder-member of the Indian and Pakistan Academies of Sciences, and later a founder member of the international body the Third World Academy of Sciences. The following are the honours he received, in reverse chronological order:

- Gold medal of the Soviet Academy of Sciences
- Third World Academy of Sciences – TWAS Prize, 1985
- Hilal-e-Imtiaz, (Crescent of Excellence) 1980 by the Government of Pakistan
- President of Pakistan's Pride of Performance Medal, 1966
- Sitara-e-Imtiaz, 1962 (Star of Excellence) by the Government of Pakistan
- Fellow of the Royal Society, 1961
- President, Pan-Indian Ocean Science Association, 1960
- Tamgha-e-Pakistan, 1958 (Medal of Pakistan)
- D. Med. Honoris causa from the Frankfurt University, 1958
- Foundation Fellow, Pakistan Academy of Sciences, 1953
- Order of the British Empire in 1946

== See also ==
- Atta ur Rahman (scientist)
- H.E.J. Research Institute of Chemistry
- Muhammad Iqbal Choudhary

== Bibliography ==
- Ali, S. S.; Khan, K. M.; Echner, H.; Voelter, W.; Hasan, M.; Atta-Ur-Rahman (1995). "Two new Protecting Groups for the Guanidino Function of arginine". Journal für Praktische Chemie/Chemiker-Zeitung. 337: 12–17. doi:10.1002/prac.19953370103.
- Ara, I.; Siddiqui, B. S.; Faizi, S.; Siddiqui, S. (1989). "Structurally novel diterpenoid constituents from the stem bark of Azadirachta indica(meliaceae)". Journal of the Chemical Society, Perkin Transactions 1 (2): 343. doi:10.1039/P19890000343.
- Faizi, S. (2002). "Jafrine, a novel and labile β-carboline alkaloid from the flowers of Tagetes patula". Tetrahedron. 58 (31): 6185–6197. doi:10.1016/S0040-4020(02)00615-4.
- Ganguli, S. (2002). Neem: A therapeutic for all seasons. Current Science. 82(11), June. p. 1304
- Hong, K.; Brugada, J.; Oliva, A.; Berruezo-Sanchez, A.; Potenza, D.; Pollevick, G. D.; Guerchicoff, A.; Matsuo, K.; Burashnikov, E.; Dumaine, R.; Towbin, J. A.; Nesterenko, V.; Brugada, P.; Antzelevitch, C.; Brugada, R. (2004). "Value of Electrocardiographic Parameters and Ajmaline Test in the Diagnosis of Brugada Syndrome Caused by SCN5A Mutations". Circulation. 110 (19): 3023–3027. doi:10.1161/01.CIR.0000144299.17008.07. PMC 1513622. PMID 15520322.
- Siddiqui, S. and Siddiqui, R.H. (1931). Chemical examination of the roots of Rauwolfia serpintina. Journal of the Indian Chemical Society. 8. pp. 667–80.
- Siddiqui, S. and Siddiqui, R.H. (1932). The alkaloids of Rauwolfia serpintina. Part I. Ajmaline series. Journal of the Indian Chemical Society. 9. p. 539.
- Siddiqui, S. and Siddiqui, R.H. (1935). The alkaloids of Rauwolfia serpintina. Part II. Ajmaline series. Journal of the Indian Chemical Society. 12. p. 37.
- Siddiqui, S. (1942). A note on isolation of three new bitter principles from the neem oil. Current Science. 11. pp. 278–79.
- Siddiqui, S.; Begum, S.; Siddiqui, B. S.; Hafeez, F. (1989). "Kanerin and 12, 13-Dihydroursolic Acid, Two New Pentacyclic Triterpenes from the Leaves of Nerium oleander". Journal of Natural Products. 52 (1): 57–62. Bibcode:1989JNAtP..52...57S. doi:10.1021/np50061a006.
- Sidhu, O. (2004). "Variability in triterpenoids (nimbin and salanin) composition of neem among different provenances of India". Industrial Crops and Products. 19: 69–00. doi:10.1016/j.indcrop.2003.07.002.

Government offices
Preceded by Office created	Science Advisor to the Prime minister Secretariat; 1 January 1951 – 27 October 1959	Succeeded by Abdus Salam
