= Bina Shaheen Siddiqui =

Pakistani chemist

- Citizenship: Pakistani
- Awards: Dr. Abdus Salam Prize in Chemistry (1986); Nishan-e-Azmat-e-Ilm Plaque, Karachi University (1989); Nishan-e-Azmat-e-Danish Plaque, Karachi University (1993); Nishane- Danish Plaque, Karachi University (1998); First Prize of the National Book Foundation (1997); Star Woman of the Year Award and Gold Medal by Star Girls and Women’s Foundation (1997); Tamgha-i-Imtiaz, Government of Pakistan (2000); Khwarizmi Award by the President of Islamic Republic of Iran (2001); Sitara-i-Imtiaz by the Govt. of Pakistan (2004); Distinguished National Professor (HEC)
- Scientific career
- Workplaces: H.E.J. Research Institute of Chemistry

Bina Shaheen Siddiqui is a Pakistani chemist and the Director of the H.E.J. Research Institute of Chemistry at the University of Karachi. Siddiqui graduated from the University of Karachi with an MPhil in 1978. In 1980, she graduated from the same university with a PhD in organic chemistry.

She specialises in the chemical components of Pakistan's indigenous plants. She was elected to The World Academy of Sciences in 1989, and was elected a Fellow of the Pakistan Academy of Sciences in 1997. She is also a Fellow of the Chemical Society of Pakistan.

== Awards ==
- Dr. Abdus Salam Prize in Chemistry (1986)
- Nishan-e-Azmat-e-Ilm Plaque, Karachi University (1989)
- Nishan-e-Azmat-e-Danish Plaque, Karachi University (1993)
- Nishan-e-Danish Plaque, Karachi University (1998)
- First Prize of the National Book Foundation (1997)
- Star Woman of the Year Award and gold medal by Star Girls and Women's Foundation (1997)
- Tamgha-e-Imtiaz, Government of Pakistan (2000)
- Khwarizmi Award by the President of Islamic Republic of Iran (2001)
- Sitara-e-Imtiaz by the Govt. of Pakistan (2004)
- Distinguished National Professor (HEC)

== Selected publications ==
- Siddiqui B.S., Afshan F., Rasheed M., Kardar N., Begum S., Faizi S. (2002) Medicinal Plants - A Source of Potential Chemicals of Diverse Structures and Biological Activity. In: Şener B. (eds) Biodiversity. Springer, Boston, MA.
- Siddiqui, Bina S.; Khan, Shazia; Nadeem Kardar, M. (2010). "A new isoflavone from the fruits of Madhuca latifolia". Natural Product Research. 24 (1): 76–80. doi:10.1080/14786410902830100. PMID 20013476. S2CID 852204.
- Faizi, Shaheen; Siddiqui, Bina Shaheen; Saleem, Rubeena; Siddiqui, Salimuzzaman; Aftab, Khalid; Gilani, Anwar-ul Hassan (1994). "Isolation and Structure Elucidation of New Nitrile and Mustard Oil Glycosides from Moringa oleifera and Their Effect on Blood Pressure". Journal of Natural Products. 57 (9): 1256–1261. doi:10.1021/np50111a011. PMID 7798960.
