= Muhammad Iqbal Choudhary =

Pakistani organic chemist (born 1959)

Muhammad Iqbal Choudhary TI SI HI
- Born: 11 September 1959 (age 67); Karachi, Pakistan
- Education: University of Karachi; Cornell University
- Known for: Natural product chemistry Organic chemistry
- Awards: Mustafa Prize in 2021; Hilal-i-Imtiaz (Crescent of Excellence) in 2007; Sitara-i-Imtiaz (Star of Excellence) in 2001; Tamgha-i-Imtiaz (Medal of Excellence) in 1998
- Scientific career
- Fields: Organic Chemistry
- Workplaces: International Centre for Chemical & Biological Sciences (HEJ Research Institute of Chemistry & Dr Panjwani Centre For Molecular Medicine & Drug Research)

Muhammad Iqbal Choudhary (Urdu: محمد اقبال چودھری; born 11 September 1959) is a Pakistani organic chemist. He is known for his research in natural product chemistry and has published over 1,600 research papers. In 2015, he was recognized as the second most productive scientist in Pakistan.

In recognition of his contributions to Sino-Pakistani research collaborations, Hunan University of Chinese Medicine in China named a research center after him in 2024.

== Education ==
Choudhary earned his BSc from the University of Karachi, followed by an MSc in organic chemistry from the same institution. He completed his PhD in organic chemistry at the H.E.J. Research Institute of Chemistry at the University of Karachi. His doctoral thesis was titled "The Isolation and Structural Studies on Some Medicinal Plants of Pakistan, Buxus papillosa, Catharanthus roseus, and Cissampelos pareira." He conducted post-doctoral research at Cornell University in the United States.

== Career ==
Choudhary has served as a professor at the H.E.J. Research Institute of Chemistry and Dr. Panjwani Centre for Molecular Medicine & Drug Research. He is currently professor emeritus at the University of Karachi and served as Director of the International Center for Chemical and Biological Sciences.

He has held visiting professor positions at:

- University of Rhode Island, United States
- Universiti Kebangsaan Malaysia
- King Abdulaziz University, Saudi Arabia

In October 2024, President Asif Ali Zardari reappointed Choudhary as the Coordinator General of COMSTECH for a second four-year term. He had previously been serving in the role since April 2020.

== Awards and honors ==
Choudhary has received numerous awards for his contributions to organic chemistry:

- Mustafa Prize (2021) for discovery of molecules with therapeutic applications
- Hilal-i-Imtiaz (Crescent of Excellence) by the President of Pakistan (2007)
- Sitara-i-Imtiaz (Star of Excellence) by the President of Pakistan (2001)
- Tamgha-i-Imtiaz (Medal of Excellence) by the Government of Pakistan (1998)
- Distinguished National Professor, Higher Education Commission of Pakistan (2004)
- COMSTECH Award in Chemistry (2010)
- TWAS Award (Third World Academy of Sciences Young Scientist Award), Italy (1994)
- Khwarizmi International Award by the President of Iran (2006)
- Economic Cooperation Organization Award by the President of Azerbaijan (2006)
- Senior Fulbright Award, United States (1997–1998)
- Gold medal of Pakistan Academy of Sciences (1993)

He is an elected fellow of:

- Islamic World Academy of Sciences (2002)
- Pakistan Academy of Sciences (2003)
- Third World Academy of Sciences (2003)

== Research contributions ==
Choudhary's research has focused on natural product chemistry, particularly the isolation and structural elucidation of bioactive compounds from medicinal plants. His notable publications include studies on cholinesterase inhibitors, α-glucosidase inhibitors, and antibacterial compounds from various plant sources. He has also authored the book "Solving Problems with Nuclear Magnetic Resonance Spectroscopy" published by Academic Press in 1996.

Selected publications include:

- Studies on steroidal alkaloids from Sarcococca saligna with cholinesterase-inhibiting and antibacterial properties
- Research on α-glucosidase inhibitors from Ferula mongolica
- Investigation of alkaloids from Buxus papillosa, Rhazya stricta, and Alstonia macrophylla
- Work on fungal biotransformation of terpenoids

== Controversies ==
Choudhary's tenure as director of the International Center for Chemical and Biological Sciences has been the subject of allegations and disputes reported in Pakistani media.

According to reports in Pakistani newspapers, critics including members of the HEJ Action Committee and University of Karachi staff have raised concerns about several matters. These include questions about the procedures for his reappointment as director over a 20-year period, allegations of post-retirement involvement in institutional affairs, and disputes regarding financial audits.

In 2020 one Choudhary's doctoral committed suicide. The reasons cited were of harassment from her supervisor.

Former Higher Education Commission Chairman Tariq Banuri publicly criticized auditing practices during Choudhary's directorship, citing governance concerns. Following this, the government passed a resolution affecting Banuri's administrative authority.

In December 2023, staff members submitted a complaint to the caretaker Chief Minister of Sindh containing allegations of rule violations and financial irregularities, accompanied by supporting documentation. The complaint questioned the approval process for Choudhary's appointments to the director position.

Questions have been raised in media reports about the volume of Choudhary's research output during his administrative tenure. Choudhary has denied the allegations and maintained that he has international credibility in the scientific community.
