= National Institute for Biotechnology and Genetic Engineering =

Pakistani government agency

National Institute for Biotechnology and Genetic Engineering (NIBGE)

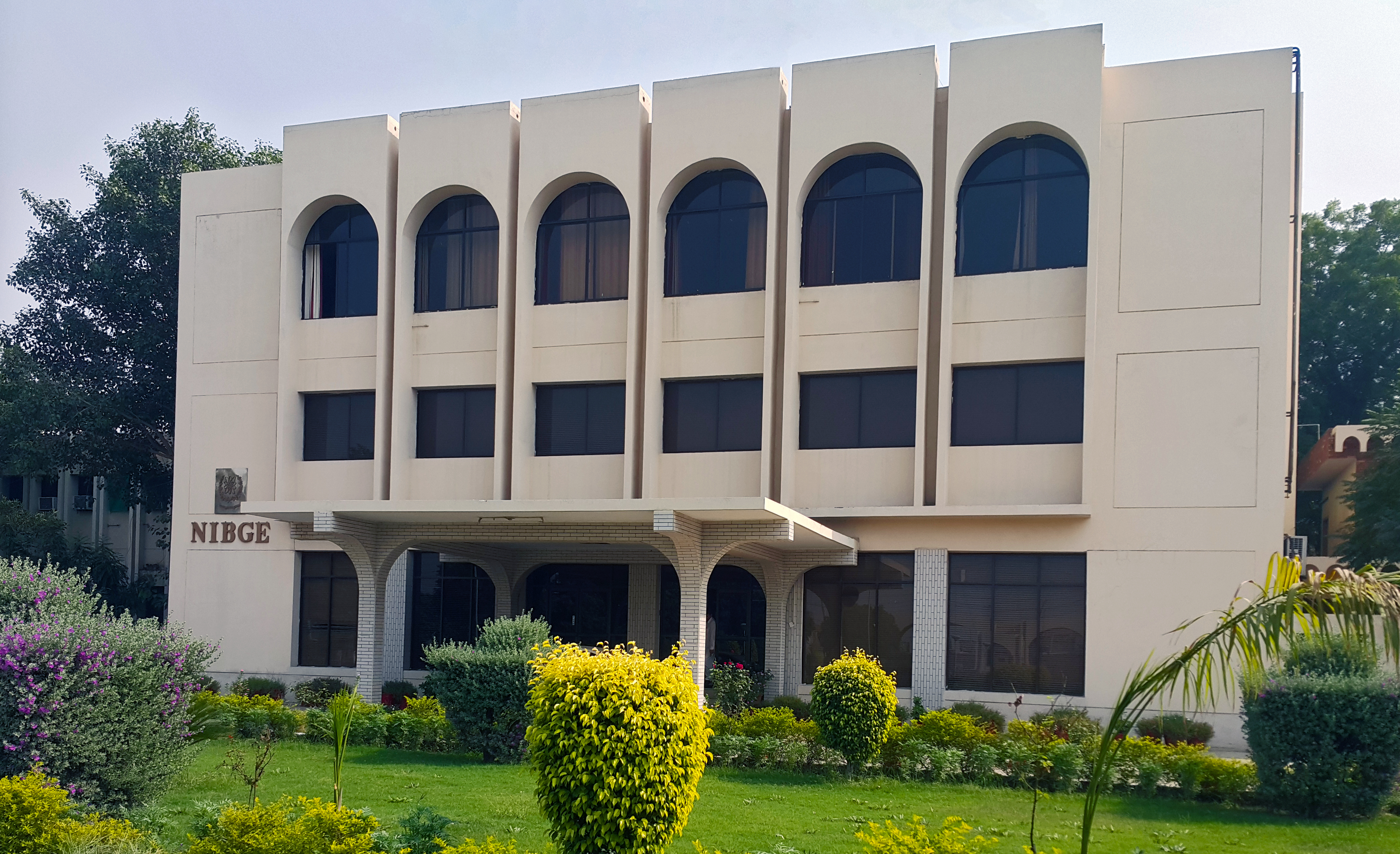
- Abbreviation: NIBGE
- Formation: 1994; 32 years ago
- Legal status: Institute
- Purpose: Improving Agriculture, Health, Environment and Industry
- Location: Faisalabad, Punjab Province
- Official language: English and Urdu
- Director: Dr. Shahid Mansoor
- Affiliations: Pakistan Atomic Energy Commission, International Centre for Genetic Engineering and Biotechnology
- Staff: 400
- Website: www.nibge.org

National Institute for Biotechnology and Genetic Engineering or NIBGE (Urdu: قومی ادارہَ برائے فنونِ حیاتیاتی و مہندسیِ امورِ تناسل) is one of the main biotechnology institutes operated by Pakistan Atomic Energy Commission (PAEC). It is located in Faisalabad.

The institution has collaborated with the Centre of Excellence in Molecular Biology (CEMB), at the Punjab University to tackle mosquito spread in wastewater bodies.

== History ==
It was planned under the auspices of PAEC in 1987 and was formally inaugurated by president of Pakistan Farooq Leghari in 1994. It is affiliated to Pakistan Institute of Engineering & Applied Sciences (PIEAS) Islamabad, for awarding MPhil & PhD degrees. NIBGE is also the home institution of many Commodity Auctions and National Biology Talent Contest.

== Research divisions ==
There are five research divisions at NIBGE:

1. Agricultural Biotechnology Division (ABD)
2. Health Biotechnology Division (HBD): offers services and products in areas of health biotechnology such as Human Molecular Genetics, Monogenic disorders, Karyotyping, Bacteriology, Complex disorders, Identification and synthesis of novel therapeutic agents.
3. Industrial Biotechnology Division (IBD)
4. Soil and Environmental Biotechnology Division (SEBD)
5. Technical Services Division

== Research areas ==
NIBGE's Agricultural Biotechnology Division has conducted extensive research on genetically engineered and disease-resistant cotton, Pakistan's largest cash crop. In 2021, NIBGE scientists developed and characterized NIBGE-1601, an insect-resistant cotton line containing a double Cry1Ac-Cry2Ab gene construct designed to provide more durable resistance to pink bollworm than earlier single-gene Bt cotton varieties, and created event-specific PCR primers to distinguish it from other commercial cotton events for intellectual property verification purposes.

The institute has also researched resistance to cotton leaf curl disease (CLCuD), a whitefly-transmitted viral disease that has caused repeated epidemics in Pakistan's cotton crop since the 1990s. NIBGE researchers, in collaboration with international partners, found that the exotic cotton accession Mac7 maintained resistance against the cotton leaf curl virus complex responsible for the disease's third major epidemic in Pakistan, and have used the line to develop new resistant cotton varieties.

== Notable alumni and faculty ==
- Irshad Hussain

== Overview ==
There are more than 370 books currently present in NIBGE Library. More than 20 theories have been published from NIBGE.
