= Awais Khan (plant geneticist) =

Pakistani American plant geneticist

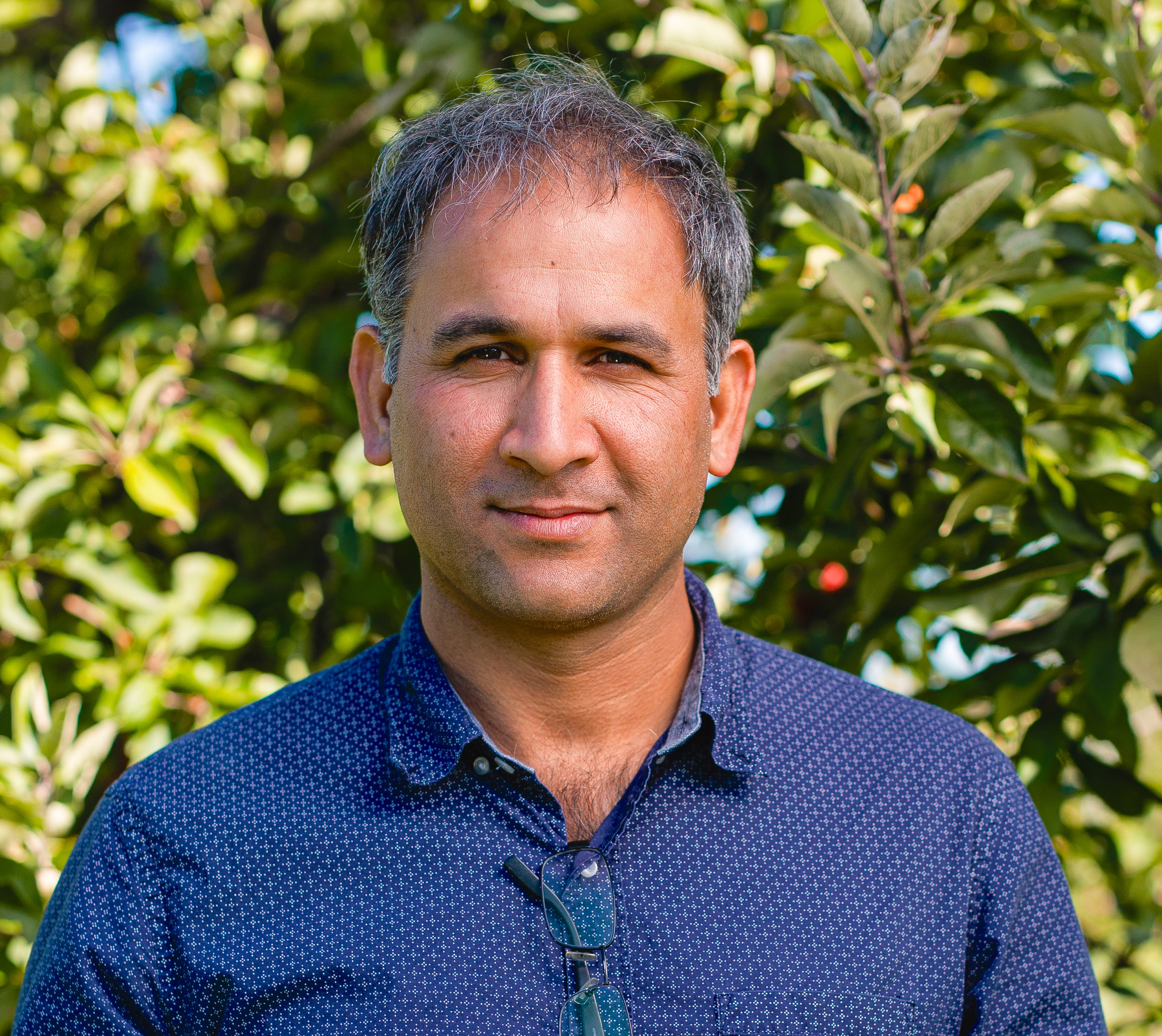
- Born: 1977 (age 48–49); Pallandri, Azad Jammu & Kashmir, Pakistan
- Education: Georg-August University, Gottingen, Germany; Swiss Federal Institute of Technology (ETH), Zurich, Switzerland
- Known for: Plant Genetics, Plant Genomics, Crop improvement, Genetics and Genomics of Apples
- Scientific career
- Fields: Agriculture
- Workplaces: International Potato Center (CIP); Cornell University

Awais Khan (born 1977) is a Pakistani-American plant geneticist and professor at the College of Agriculture and Life Sciences, Cornell University.

His research focuses on genetics of disease resistance in apples, crop improvement, sustainable agriculture, and food security. Prior to taking this position, he was leading a global research program on genetics of adaptation and abiotic stress tolerance in potatoes and sweetpotatoes, at the International Potato Center (CIP), Lima, Peru^{.}

== Biography ==
Khan was born in a small village called Tahlian in Pallandri, Azad Kashmir (the Pakistani-administered part of the disputed Jammu and Kashmir region) and was from a humble financial background. His primary-level education was at a "taat school," where the students sat on a jute mat (taat) on the ground and he also helped his parents raise crops and livestock.

He earned a PhD from the Swiss Federal Institute of Technology (ETH), Zurich, Switzerland on fire blight of apples, and an MSc from Georg-August University, Gottingen, Germany, with further research experience at the University of York, UK and University of Illinois, Urbana-Champaign, United States.

He has published in several high impact scientific journals including Science, Nature Genetics, and Genome Research. His research on rapid decline of apple trees, fire blight, genetics, and genomics of apples has been also highlighted in popular magazines, including Science Magazine, The Economist, New York Times, and Forbes. In 2022, Dr. Khan co-led a research and completed a chromosome-scale genome sequence assembly of Honeycrisp apples.

== Selected publications ==
- Tegtmeier R, Pompili V, Singh J, Micheletti D, Silva JK, Malnoy M, Khan MA. 2020. Candidate gene mapping identifies genomic variations in the fire blight susceptibility genes HIPM and DIPM across the Malus germplasm. Scientific Reports, 10, 16317.
- Papp D, Gao L, Thapa R, Olmstead D, Khan MA. 2020. Field apple scab susceptibility of a diverse Malus germplasm collection identifies potential sources of resistance for apple breeding. CABI Agriculture and Bioscience, In Press.
- Thapa R, Zhang K, Snavely N, Belongie S, Khan MA. 2020. The Plant Pathology 2020 challenge dataset to classify foliar disease of apples. Applications in Plant Sciences, 8 (9), e11390.
- Singh J, Cobb-Smith D, Higgins E, Khan MA. 2020. Comparative evaluation of lateral flow immunoassays, LAMP, and quantitative PCR for diagnosis of fire blight in apple orchards. Journal of Plant Pathology, doi:10.1007/s42161-020-00644-w.
- Yu M, Singh J, Khan MA, Sundin GW, Zhao Y. 2020. Complete genome sequence of the fire blight pathogen Erwinia amylovora strain Ea1189. Molecular Plant-Microbe Interactions, doi:10.1094/MPMI-06-20-0158-A.
- Pereira G, Gemenet D, Mollinari M, Olukolu B, Wood J, Diaz F, Mosquera V, Gruneberg W, Khan MA, Buell R, Yencho C, Zeng ZB. 2020. Multiple QTL mapping in autopolyploids: a random-effect model approach with application in a hexaploid sweetpotato full-sib population. Genetics, 215 (3), 579-595.
- Yang H-W, Yu M, Liu J, Khan MA, Zhao Y. 2020. Characterization of genes involved in (p)ppGpp precursor biosynthesis in Erwinia amylovora. Journal of Plant Pathology, doi:10.1007/s42161-020-00583-6.
- Papp D, Singh J, Gadoury D, Khan MA. 2020. New North American isolates of Venturia inaequalis can overcome apple scab resistance of Malus floribunda 821. Plant Disease, 104 (3), 649-655.
- Singh J, Fabrizio J, Desnoues E, Pereira Silva J, Busch W, Khan MA. 2020. Root system traits impact early fire blight susceptibility in apple (Malus× domestica). BMC Plant Biology, 19 (1), 1-14.
- Mollinari M, Olukolu B, Pereira G, Khan MA, Gemenet D, Yencho C, and Zeng ZB. 2019. Unraveling the hexaploid sweetpotato inheritance using ultra-dense multilocus mapping. G3: Genes|Genomes|Genetics, 10 (1), 281-292.
- Singh J and Khan MA. 2019. Distinct patterns of natural selection determine sub-population structure in the fire blight pathogen, Erwinia amylovora. Scientific Reports, 9 (1), 1-13.
- Gemenet D, Pereira G, Boeck D, Wood J, Mollinari M, Olukolu B, Diaz F, Mosquera V, Ssali R, David M, Kitavi M, Burgos G, Zum Felde T, Ghislain M, Carey E, Swanckaert J, Coin L, Fei Z, Hamilton J, Yada B, Yencho C, Zeng ZB, Mwanga R, Khan MA, Gruneberg W, Buell R. 2019. Quantitative trait loci and differential gene expression analyses reveal the genetic basis for negatively-associated β-carotene and starch content in hexaploid sweetpotato [Ipomoea batatas (L.) Lam.]. Theoretical and Applied Genetics, 133, 23-36.
- Li X, Singh J, Qin M, Li X, Zhang X, Zhang M, Khan MA, Zhang S, Wu J. 2019. Development of an integrated 200K SNP genotyping array and application for genetic mapping, genome assembly improvement and GWAS in pear (Pyrus). Plant Biotechnology Journal, 17 (8), 1582-1594.
- Pereira Silva KJ, Singh J, Bednarek R, Fei Z, Khan MA. 2019. Differential gene regulatory responses to fire blight infection in two apple cultivars (Malus× domestica). Horticulture Research, 6 (1), 35.
- Singh J, Pereira Silva KJ, Fuchs M, and Khan MA. 2019. Potential role of weather, soil and plant microbial communities in rapid decline of apple trees. PloSONE, 14 (3), doi:10.1371/journal.pone.0213293.
- Wu S, Lau KH, Cao Q, Hamilton JP, Sun H, Zhou C, Eserman L, Gemenet DC, Olukolu BA, Wang H, Crisovan E, Godden G, Jiao C, Wang X, Kitavi N, Manrique-Carpintero N, Vaillancourt B, Wiegert-Rininger K, Yang X, Bao K, Schaff J, Kreuze J, Gruneberg W, Khan MA, Ghislain M, Ma D, Jiang J, Mwanga R, Leebens-Mack J, Coin L, Yencho C, Buell R, Fei Z. 2018. Genome sequences of two diploid wild relatives of cultivated sweetpotato reveal targets for genetic improvement. Nature Communications, 9 (1), 4580.
- Lau KH, del Rosario Herrera M, Crisovan E, Wu S, Fei Z, Khan MA, Buell CR, Gemenet DC. 2018. Transcriptomic analysis of sweet potato under dehydration stress identifies candidate genes for drought tolerance. Plant Direct, 2 (10), doi:10.1002/pld3.92.
- Zhou C, Duarte T, Silvestre R, Rossel G, Mwanga RO, Khan MA, George AW, Fei Z, Yencho GC, Ellis D, Coin LJ. 2018. Insights into population structure of East African sweetpotato cultivars from hybrid assembly of chloroplast genomes. Gates Open Research, 5 (2).
- Villordon A, Gregorie JC, LaBonte D, Khan MA, Selvaraj M. 2018. Variation in ‘Bayou Belle’ and ‘Beauregard’ sweetpotato root length in response to experimental phosphorus deficiency and compacted layer treatments. HortScience, 53 (10), 1534-1540.
- Wu J, Wang Y, Xu J, Korban SS, Fei Z, Tao S, Ming R, Tai S, Khan MA, Postman JD, Gu C. 2018. Diversification and independent domestication of Asian and European pears. Genome Biology, 19 (1), 77.
- Desnoues E, Norelli JL, Aldwinckle HS, Wisniewski ME, Evans KM, Malnoy M, Khan MA. 2018. Identification of novel strain-specific and environment-dependent minor QTLs linked to fire blight resistance in apples. Plant Molecular Biology Reporter, 36 (2), 247-256.
- Bai J, Mao J, Yang H, Khan MA, Fan A, Liu S, Zhang J, Wang D, Gao H, and Zhang J. 2017. Sucrose non-ferment 1 related protein kinase 2 (SnRK 2) genes could mediate the stress responses in potato (Solanum tuberosum L.). BMC Genetics, 18 (1), 41.
- Ramírez DA, Yactayo W, Rens LR, Rolando JL, Palacios S, De Mendiburu F, Mares V, Barreda C, Loayza H, Monneveux P, Zotarelli L, Khan MA, Quiroz R. 2016. Defining biological thresholds associated to plant water status for monitoring water restriction effects: Stomatal conductance and photosynthesis recovery as key indicators in potato. Agricultural Water Management, 177, 369-378.
- Saravia D, Farfán E, Gutiérrez R, Mendiburu F, Schafleitner R, Bonierbale M, Khan MA. 2016. Yield and physiological response of potatoes indicate different strategies to cope with drought stress and nitrogen fertilization. American Journal of Potato Research, 93 (3), 288-295.
- Lindqvist Kreuze H, Khan MA, Salas E, Meiyalaghan S, Thomson S, Gomez R, Bonierbale M. 2015. Tuber shape and eye depth variation in a diploid family of Andean potatoes. BMC Genetics, 16 (1), 57.
- Khan MA, Olsen KM, Sovero V, Kushad MM, Korban SS. 2014. Fruit quality traits might have played crucial role in domestication of apple. The Plant Genome, 7 (3), doi:10.3835/plantgenome2014.04.0018.
- Potts SM, Khan MA, Han Y, Kushad MM, Korban SS. 2014. Identification of Quantitative Trait Loci (QTLs) for Fruit Quality Traits in Apple. Plant Molecular Biology Reporter, 32 (1), 109-116.
- Khan MA, Zhao YF, Korban SS. 2013. Identification of genetic loci associated with fire blight resistance in Malus through combined use of QTL and association mapping. Physiologia Plantarum, 148 (3), 344-53.
- Wu J, Wang Z, Shi Z, Zhang S, Ming R, Z Shilin, Khan MA, Tao S, Korban SS, Wang H, Chen NJ, Nishio T, Xu X, Cong L, Qi K, Huang X, Wang Y, Zhao X, Wu J, Deng C, Gou C, Zhou W, Yin H, Qin G, Sha Y, Tao Y, Chen H, Yang Y, Song Y, Zhan D, Wang J, Li L, Dai M, Gu C, Wang Y, Shi D, Wang X, Zhang H, Zeng L, Zheng D, Wang C, Chen M, Wang G, Xie L, Sovero V, Sha S, Huang W, Zhang S, Zhang M, Sun J, Xu L, Li Y, Liu X, Li Q, Shen J, Wang J, Paull RE, Bennetzen JL, Wang J, Zhang S. 2012. The genome of pear (Pyrus bretschneideri Rehd.). Genome Research, 23 (2), 396-408.
- Khan MA, Han Y, Zhao YF, Troggio M, Korban SS. 2012. A multi-population consensus genetic map reveals inconsistent marker order among maps likely attributed to structural variations in the apple genome. PloSONE, 7 (11), doi:10.1371/journal.pone.0047864.
- Chen Jun, Khan MA, Qiu W-M, Li J, Zhou H, Zhang Q, Guo W, Zhu T, Peng J, Sun F, Li S, Korban SS, Han Y. 2012. Diversification of genes encoding granule-bound starch synthase (GBSS) in monocots and dicots is marked by multiple genome-wide duplication events. PloSONE, 7 (1), doi:10.1371/journal.pone.0030088.
- Khan MA, Han Y, Korban SS. 2012. A high-throughput apple SNP genotyping assay using the GoldenGateTM platform. GENE (Elsevier), 494, 196-201.
- Potts SM., Han Y, Khan MA, Kushad MM, Rayburn AL and Korban SS. 2011. Genetic diversity and characterization of a core collection of Malus germplasm using simple sequence repeats (SSRs). Plant Molecular Biology Reporter, 30 (4), 827-837.
- Han Y, Zheng D, Vimolmangkang S, Khan MA, Beever JE, Korban SS. 2011. Integration of physical and genetic maps in apple confirms whole-genome and segmental duplications in the apple genome. Journal of Experimental Botany, 62 (14), 5117-5130.
- Graham IA, Besser K, Blumer S, Branigan CA, Czechowski T, Elias L, Guterman I, Harvey D, Isaac PG, Khan MA, Larson TR, Li Y, Owens S, Pawson T, Penfield T, Rae AM, Rathbone DA, Ross J, Smallwood MF, Segura V, Townsend T, Vyas D, Winzer T and Bowles D. 2010. The genetic map of Artemisia annua L. identifies multiple loci affecting yield of the antimalarial drug artemisinin, Science, 327, 328-331.
- Le Roux PM, Khan MA, Duffy B, Patocchi A, Broggini GAL and Gessler C. 2010. Quantitative trait loci mapping of fire blight resistance in the apple cultivars 'Florina' and 'NovaEasygro'. Genome, 53, 710-722.
- Khan MA, Durel C-E, Duffy B, Drouet D, Kellerhals M, Gessler C and Patocchi A. 2008. Identification and validation of QTLs linked to fire blight resistance in Malus and their applicability in marker-assisted selection. Twelfth (12th) EUCARPIA symposium on fruit breeding and genetics. Acta Horticulture (ISHS), 814, 753-758.
- Khan MA, Durel C-E, Duffy B, Drouet D, Kellerhals M, Gessler C and Patocchi A. 2007. Development of molecular markers linked to the 'Fiesta' linkage group 7 major QTL for fire blight resistance and their application for marker-assisted selection. Genome, 50, 568-577.
- Khan MA, Duffy B, Gessler C and Patocchi A. 2006. QTL mapping of fire blight resistance in apple. Molecular Breeding, 17, 299-306.

== Sources ==
- Cornell University staff page
- Forbes article
