= Nuclear Institute for Food and Agriculture =

Pakistani research institution

Nuclear Institute for Food and Agricultur
- Abbreviation: NIFA
- Formation: April 26, 1982; 44 years ago
- Type: Industrial and Scientific research
- Legal status: Institute
- Purpose: Agriculture Industrialization and Food irradiation
- Headquarters: Location
- Location: Peshawar, Khyber-Pakhtunkhwa Province
- Official language: English and Urdu
- Director: Dr. Ihsanullah
- Affiliations: Pakistan Atomic Energy Commission

The Nuclear Institute for Food and Agriculture, known as NIFA, (جوہری ادارہ برائے خوراک و زراعت) is one of four agriculture and food irradiation research institute managed by the Pakistan Atomic Energy Commission.
