= Atta-ur-Rahman (chemist) =

Pakistani chemist

Atta-ur-Rahman NI, FRS, FPAS
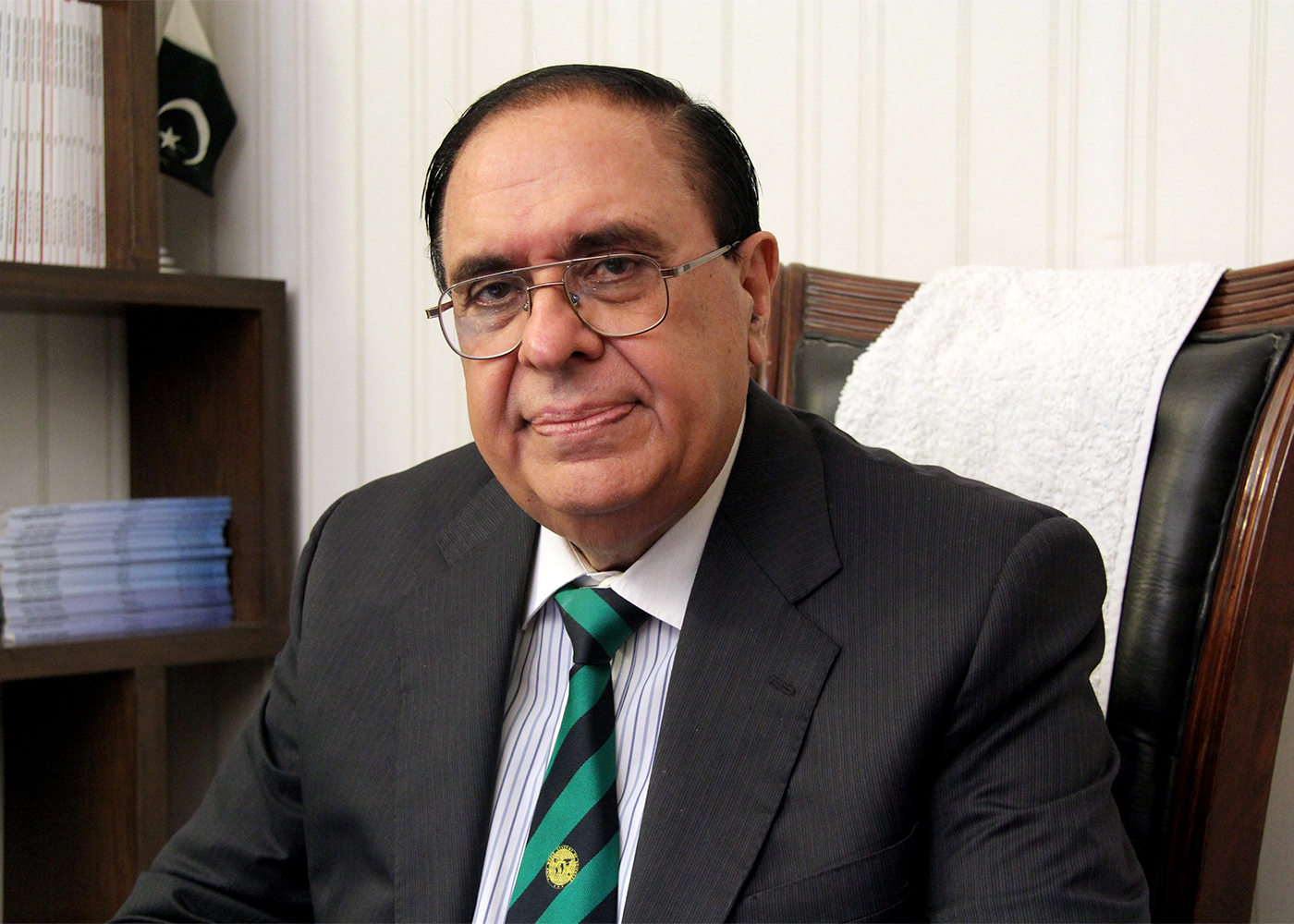
- Atta-ur-Rahman in 2014
- Born: 22 September 1942 (age 83); Delhi, British Raj
- Education: University of Karachi; University of Cambridge
- Known for: Natural product chemistry
- Awards: Nishan-e-Imtiaz (2002); Hilal-e-Imtiaz (1998); Sitara-e-Imtiaz (1991); Tamgha-e-Imtiaz (1983); UNESCO Prize (1999); Austria Order of Merit
- Scientific career
- Fields: Organic chemistry
- Workplaces: Higher Education Commission of Pakistan; University of Tübingen; University of Karachi; University of Cambridge
- Thesis: Synthetic Studies in the Indole Alkaloid Field (1968)
- Doctoral advisor: J. Harley Mason
- Other academic advisors: Ian Fleming
- Website: atta-ur-rahman.com

Atta-ur-Rahman (Urdu: عطاالرحمان; b. 22 September 1942), NI, FRS, FPAS is a Pakistani organic chemist currently serving as professor emeritus at the International Center for Chemical and Biological Sciences at the University of Karachi and as Chairman of the Prime Minister 's Task Force on Science and Technology. He has twice served as the President of Pakistan Academy of Sciences (2003–2006, and 2011–2014). He was the Federal Minister of Science and Technology (2000–2002), Federal Minister of Education (2002) and Chairman Higher Education Commission with status of Federal Minister (2002–2008) He is also the President of the Network of Academies of Sciences in Countries of the Organisation of Islamic Countries (NASIC). After returning to Pakistan from Cambridge after completing his tenure as Fellow of Kings College, Cambridge University, he contributed to the development of the International Center for Chemical and Biological Sciences at the University of Karachi, and transforming the landscape of higher education, science and technology of Pakistan. He is Fellow of Royal Society (London), Life Fellow of Kings College, Cambridge University, UK, Academician Chinese Academy of Sciences and professor emeritus at University of Karachi.

== Education ==
Atta-ur-Rahman was born on 22 September 1942 in Old Delhi into an Urdu-speaking academic family. His grandfather, Sir Abdur Rahman, was a vice-chancellor of the University of Delhi (1934–38) who briefly served as a judge at the Madras High Court.

In 1946, Abdur Rahman was appointed as vice-chancellor of the Punjab University in Lahore, eventually relocating his family there, a year before the partition of India took place. Abdur Rahman eventually became a Senior Justice at the Supreme Court of Pakistan in 1949. His father, Jamil-ur-Rahman, was a lawyer who established a cotton ginning textile industry in Okara, Punjab, Pakistan. After settling in Karachi in 1952, he passed the competitive O-Level and A-Level from the Karachi Grammar School and joined Karachi University.

Attending Karachi University in 1960, Rahman graduated with a bachelor's degree (with honors) in chemistry in 1963. He obtained a Master of Science (MSc) in organic chemistry in 1964 with first class and 1st position, and lectured at Karachi University for a year before receiving a Commonwealth Scholarship for doctoral studies in the United Kingdom. He joined King's College at the University of Cambridge and resumed research in natural products under John Harley-Mason. In 1968, Rahman received a Doctor of Philosophy (PhD) in organic chemistry; the subjects of his doctoral thesis were natural products and organic materials. He was elected as a fellow of King's College, University of Cambridge in 1969 and continued his research at Cambridge University until 1973. During that period, he is credited with correcting the earlier work of the Nobel Laureate Sir Robert Robinson on the chemistry of harmaline. Later in 2007, he was appointed as an honorary life fellow of King's College Cambridge.

== Academic career ==
In 1964, Rahman joined the Karachi University as a lecturer in undergraduate chemistry. He remained associated with the Cambridge University between 1969 and 1973, and is presently honorary Life Fellow at the King's College of the Cambridge University. In 1977, he became the co-director of the Hussain Ebrahim Jamal Research Institute of Chemistry at University of Karachi; eventually he was ascended as the Director in 1990. In 1979, Rahman did the post-doctoral research at the University of Tübingen. Upon returning to Pakistan, he joined Karachi University where he lectures and taught chemistry. He was appointed professor emeritus at University of Karachi for life.

He carried out important studies on the synthesis of anti-cancer alkaloids present in the plant Catharanthus roseus and analytical studies on organic compounds involving circular dichroism and is generally recognized as bringing a huge positive change in the development of science and technology as well as higher education in Pakistan.

His book entitled "Stereoselective Synthesis in Organic Chemistry" (Springer-Verlag) was termed a monumental contribution in the field by the Nobel Laureate Sir Derek Barton in the foreword of the book written by him. His book entitled "NMR Spectroscopy-Basic Principles" was published by Springer-Verlag and translated into Japanese for use in university courses in Japan. The Nobel Laureate Herbert C. Brown applauded the contributions of Rahman in science and technology.

== Positions held ==
- Fellow, King's College, Cambridge University (1969–1973, 2007– for Life)
- Professor at H.E.J. Research Institute of Chemistry at Karachi University
- Professor Emeritus at H.E.J. Research Institute of Chemistry at Karachi University (2012)
- Coordinator General of COMSTECH (1996–2012)
- Federal Minister of Science & Technology (2000–2002)
- Federal Minister of Education (2002)
- Federal Minister/Chairman, Higher Education Commission, Pakistan (resigned due to govt issues)(2002–2008)
- Advisor to the Prime Minister of Pakistan on Science and Technology (2002–2008)

== Government work and political advocacy ==
After securing the fellowship of the Pakistan Academy of Sciences, Rahman had been affiliated with the Pakistan government regarding education and science affairs. From 1996 until 2012, Rahman served in the board of directors of the Committee on Scientific and Technological Cooperation, representing Pakistan's delegation. In 1997, Rahman served as the Coordinator General of the Organisation of Islamic Cooperation's (OIC) Committee on Scientific and Technological Cooperation (COMSTECH) that comprised 57 Ministers of Science and Technology from 57 OIC member countries. In recognition of his scientific transformation of Pakistan and building a large number of Centers of Excellence in the country as well as promoting scientific research, Rahman was conferred the TWAS Prize in Institution Building, in Durban, South Africa in 2009. Atta-ur-Rahman has served as the co-chairman of UN ESCAP.

In 1999, he joined the Ministry of Science and Technology (MoSci) as its minister, assisting in drafting the official science policy of the country. In 2002, he was appointed as minister of the Ministry of Education (MoEd) as well as becoming the chairman of the Higher Education Commission (HEC) until resigning in 2008. Atta-ur-Rahman has also served as Chairman of the Prime Ministers National Task Force on Science and Technology, Co Chairman of Prime Ministers National Task Force on Information Technology and Telecommunications, and Vice Chairman of the Prime Ministers Task Force on Technology Driven Knowledge Economy during the years 2019 to 2022. He is the President of the Network of Science of Organisation of Islamic Countries (NASIC).

== Honours and awards ==
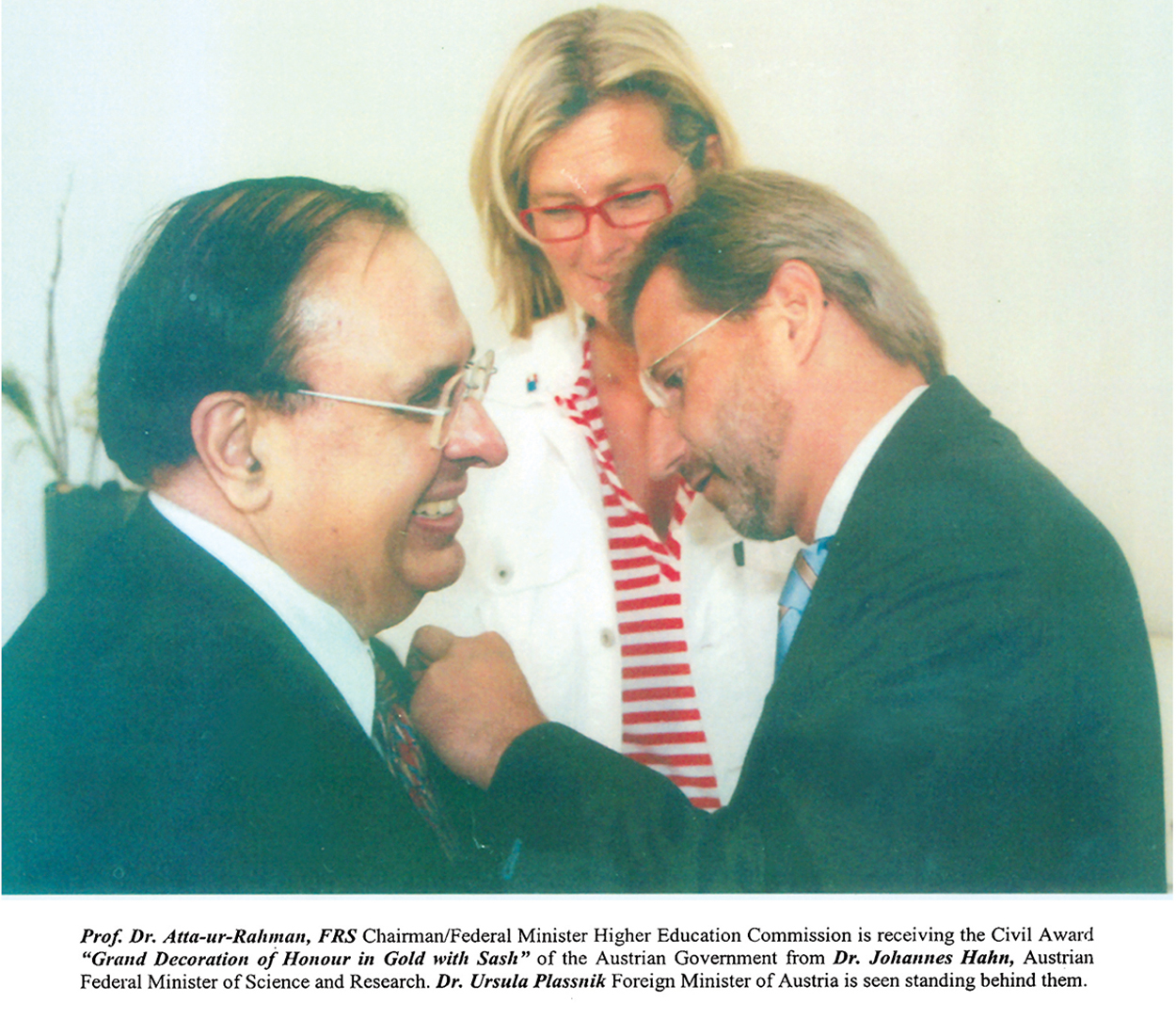
Atta-ur-Rahman receiving an award from the Minister of Higher Education of Austria for revolutionary changes brought about to uplift higher education sector in Pakistan.

Atta-ur-Rahman receiving UNESCO Science Prize at World Congress on Science in Budapest Hungary (1999)

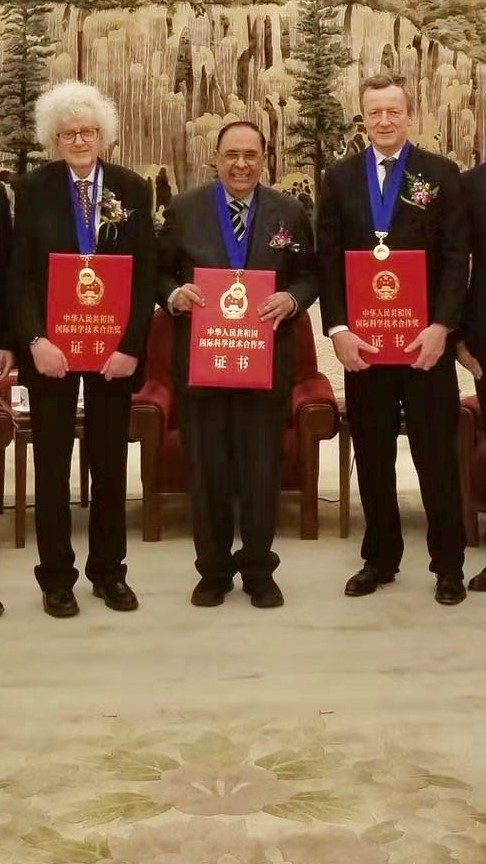
Atta-ur-Rahman (middle) after receiving the International Science and Technology Collaboration Award, from President Xi Jinping on 10 January 2020

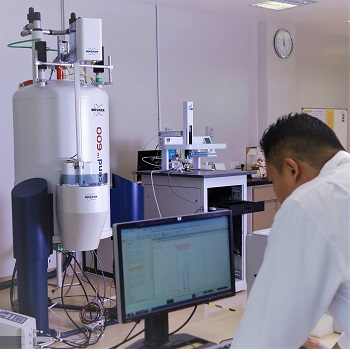
Atta-ur-Rahman Institute of Natural Product Discovery established in Universiti Teknologi, Mara, near Kuala Lumpur in Malaysia

Atta-ur-Rahman has been selected as one of the 500 most influential personalities of the Islamic World. Institutions have been named after Rahman in China, the Atta-ur-Rahman Institute for Natural Product Discovery (AuRIns) under Universiti Teknologi MARA in Malaysia and the Academician Professor Atta-ur-Rahman One Belt and One Road TCM Research Center were named after Rahman, as well as the Atta-ur-Rahman School of Applied Biosciences at the National University of Sciences & Technology (Islamabad, Pakistan) and the Atta-ur-Rahman Laboratories, International Center for Chemical and Biological Sciences at the University of Karachi (Karachi, Pakistan). The US Publisher ARKAT USA has published a special issue of the journal Arkivoc, Vol 2007, in honour of Atta-ur-Rahman FRS which had contributions from top scientists in the field of natural product chemistry. Similarly, the international journal Molecules published by the Swiss publisher MDPI published a special issue of the journal in honour of Atta-ur-Rahman. The World Academy of Sciences, Italy has introduced a special Prize in his honour (TWAS-Atta-ur-Rahman Award in Chemistry) for young scientists which is awarded once every two years. In recognition of his eminent contributions, Prof. Atta-ur-Rahman has received honorary doctorate degrees from many universities including the University of Cambridge (UK), Coventry University (UK), Bradford University (UK), Universiti Teknologi Mara (Malaysia), Asian Institute of Teknologi (Thailand), University of Karachi (Pakistan), Gomal University (Pakistan), and several other universities.

=== National and international Awards ===
In recognition of his eminent contributions in the field of organic chemistry, he has been conferred with many civil awards, including:

- Nishan-e-Imtiaz (2002) (highest national civil award)
- Hilal-e-Imtiaz (1998)
- Sitara-e-Imtiaz (1991)
- Tamgha-e-Imtiaz (1983)
- UNESCO Science Prize (1999)
- Grosse Goldene Ehrenzeischen am Bande(2007) high civil award by the Austrian government (2007)
- China, International Science and Technology Cooperation Award (2020) bestowed by Chinese President Xi Jinping in Beijing on January 7, 2020
- Academician, Chinese Academy of Sciences (2015)
- Friendship Award of China (2014)
- Vice President, The World Academy of Sciences (TWAS)
- Prescient, Network of Academies of Science of Organising of Islamic Conference (NASIC)
- Member, Korean Academy of Science and Technology
- Einstein Professorship, Chinese Academy of Sciences
- Babai Urdu Award (1994)
- Scientist of the Year Award (for 1985)/Prize Rs. 200,000 (1987)
- FPCCI Prize for Technological Innovation (1985)
- Engro Excellence Award (2010)
- HEC, National Distinguished Professor (2011–present)
- Professor Emeritus, University of Karachi (2011–present)
- Lifetime Achievement Award by University of Management and Technology, Lahore (2012)

=== Fellowships ===
- Fellow of The World Academy of Sciences (TWAS)
- Fellow of Islamic World Academy of Sciences
- Foreign Fellow of Korean Academy of Sciences
- Fellow of Pakistan Academy of Sciences
- Fellow of the Royal Society, London (July 2006)
- Honorary Life Fellow King's College, Cambridge, UK (2007)
- Fellow of Chinese Chemical Society (1997)
- Foreign Academician of the Chinese Academy of Sciences (2015)

== See also ==
- H.E.J. Research Institute of Chemistry
- Higher Education Commission
- Salimuzzaman Siddiqui
- Civil decorations of Pakistan

Government offices
Preceded by Abdul Qadeer Khan	Science Advisor to the Prime Minister; 31 January 2004 – 28 March 2008	Succeeded by Ishfaq Ahmad
