= International Center for Chemical and Biological Sciences =

Pakistani research institute

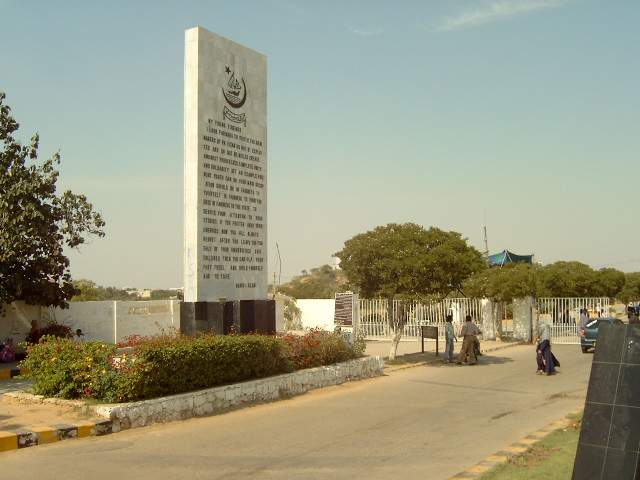
- Entrance of the University of Karachi in 2007.
- Established: 1 January 1976; 50 years ago
- Research type: Scientific research and education
- Budget: Federally funded
- Field of research: Fundamental science (computational and physical science)
- Director: Dr. Prof. M. Raza Shah
- Emeritus scientist: Atta-ur-Rahman
- Location: Karachi, Sindh, Pakistan
- Operating agency: University of Karachi
- Website: www.iccs.edu

The International Center for Chemical and Biological Sciences (ICCBS), also known as the Hussain Ebrahim Jamal Research Institute of Chemistry and Dr Panjwani for Molecular Medicine and Drug Research, is a federally funded national research institute managed by the University of Karachi.

The national site is known for its dedicated focus and research in primarily in organic chemistry and natural products but takes research in environmental cleanup and other fundamental branches of chemistry including the computational, green, medicinal, and protein chemistry. The site was established through the private funding made possible by the Husein Ebrahim Jamal Foundation in 1976 before becoming certified for the federal funding and achieved its status as national laboratory site in its success years.

The HEJ Research Institute of Chemistry 's research programs are functioning under the International Center for Chemical and Biological Sciences (ICCBS), along with Center for Molecular Medicines and National Institute of Virology (NIV)— the national laboratory sites of the Ministry of Health to combat the emerging infectious diseases.

== Overview ==
The national site has its genesis and long efforts led by the University of Karachi dedicated for educating and researching on natural product chemistry when the University of Karachi's Department of Chemistry established the "Postgraduate Institute of Chemistry" in 1967. Upon retiring from his public services as chairman of the Council of Scientific and Industrial Research, Dr. Salimuzzaman Siddiqui was employed as its chief scientist who was instrumental of establishing the national site who secured initial funding for his Institute of Chemistry when he witnessed his physicist colleagues establishing the national laboratory in physics in Nilore.

The national laboratory site was finally established in its current form with the generous private funding ($500,000 in 1976, $2.25 million as of 2020) from the HEJ Foundation in 1976, and bears the name of Hussain Ebrahim Jamal. At the time, this represented the largest private donation in nation's history to establish the national laboratory site in the country. Later, the national laboratory site was certified for federal funding and began supporting his research efforts as parallel to KRL and PINSTECH from the sponsorship of the Ministry of Defense and later the Higher Education Commission.

Atta-ur-Rahman succeeded in obtaining grants to acquire a new mass spectrometers and NMR spectrometers, both of which were installed in 1973, within a year of his return to Pakistan. He was appointed as the Co-Director in 1977. He succeeded in winning several major projects for the institute which established the institute in the field of Natural Product Chemistry. A generous donation was offered to the University for the Institute by Latif Ebrahim Jamal on behalf of the Husein Ebrahim Jamal Foundation in 1976, the largest donation at that time in the history of the country. The Institute was accordingly named as "Husein Ebrahim Jamal Research Institute of Chemistry", in the memory of late Husein Ebrahim Jamal.

Atta-ur-Rahman was appointed as the Director in January 1990, while Viqar Uddin Ahmad took over as Co-Director in 1990. In 1999, Professor Bina S. Siddiqui was appointed as the Co-Director on the retirement of Professor Ahmad, while in 2002 M. Iqbal Choudhary was given the responsibilities of the Director (Acting) of ICCBS and Co-Director of Panjwani Center for Molecular Medicine and Drug Research. In September 2008, he was appointed as the Director of the ICCBS institutions.

The institute has organized a number of major international conferences and symposia on various aspects of Natural Product Chemistry, Spectroscopy, and Protein Chemistry. The institute hosted the 19th IUPAC Symposium on Natural Product Chemistry in January 1994 in which over 500 scientists from 52 countries, including 4 Nobel Laureates participated.

Additionally, the Institute has also been selected as one of the three library centers of the Third World Academy of Sciences (TWAS). The H.E.J. Institute has been designated as the W.H.O. Center for Pesticide Analysis for the Eastern Mediterranean Region. The institute is also a member of the IUCN-International, WAITRO, and COMSATS. More recently the institute is designated as the OIC Center of Excellence in Chemical Sciences. In 2001, the H.E.J. Research Institute became a constituent institution of the International Center for Chemical Sciences (later named as International Center for Chemical and Biological Sciences).

In 2004, the H.E.J. Research Institute received the prestigious IDB (Islamic Development Bank) prize for the best science institution in the entire Islamic world. Recently, the IDB awarded the best science institution again to the H.E.J. Research Institute (second time), an unprecedented honor to any science institution in the OIC region.

In August 2003, an Industrial Analytical Center was established as the service wing of H. E. J. Institute. Third World Center (TWC) Laboratory complex was formally inaugurated by the Prime Minister of Pakistan in 2005 as an extension of the H.E.J. Research Institute of Chemistry. The building of TWC was renamed to "Atta-ur-Rahman Laboratories" by the Executive Board in 2011, in recognition of the outstanding services of Atta-ur-Rahman (FRS) who is now serving the ICCBS institution as the Patron-in-chief.

In the year 2004, the Panjwani Center for Molecular Medicine and Drug Research (PCMD) was established through a generous donation and patronage of Nadira Panjwani (Chairperson, Panjwani Memorial Trust) in the memory of her father, Mohammad Hussain Panjwani, a leading scholar and philanthropist. The main objective of the center is to train highly qualified manpower in the emerging new fields of molecular medicine and drug development. The academicians, clinicians, and pharmaceutical researchers are brought together to translate basic scientific discoveries into new therapies, vaccines, and diagnostic tests.

Late Mr. Latif Ebrahim Jamal, Chairman Ebrahim Jamal Foundation, continuing his patronage to the Institute, established the Latif Ebrahim Jamal National Science Information Center in 2005. The building of this--one of the largest paperless libraries of the region--was constructed under the direct supervision of Mr. Aziz Latif Jamal S.I. (Current Chairman Husein Ebrahim Jamal Foundation), able and committed son of (Late) Mr. Latif Ebrahim Jamal.

== Academics ==
Research Centers
- H.E.J. Research Institute of Chemistry
- Dr. Panjwani Center for Molecular Medicine & Drug Research
- Third World Center for Science and Technology
- Center for Bioequivalence Studies and Clinical Research (CBSCR)
- Industrial Analytical Center (IAC)
- Biotechnology Wing
- Prof. Dr. Wolfgang Voelter Laboratories Complex (NRL)
- Welcome to National Facility for Laboratory Animal Research and Care (NFLARC)
- L.E.J. Nanotechnology Center
- Technology Park & Technology Incubation Center
- Latif Ebrahim Jamal National Science Information Center
- Jamil-ur-Rahman Center for Genome Research
- National Institute of Virology (NIV)
- Sindh Forensic DNA and Serology Lab (SFDL)

== See also ==
- University of Karachi
- Pakistan Academy of Sciences
- Pakistan Council of Scientific and Industrial Research
- Higher Education Commission of Pakistan
- Pakistan Educational Research Network
