= Democratic Front =

Democratic Front is a name used by political parties and alliances in several countries, such as:

- Democratic Front (Albania)
- Democratic Front (Bosnia and Herzegovina)
- Democratic Front (Cyprus)
- Democratic Front Party (Egypt)
- Democratic Front (France)
- Democratic Front (Georgia)
- Democratic Front (Guinea-Bissau)
- Democratic Front (India)
- Democratic Front (Italy)
- Democratic Front (Montenegro)
- Democratic Front for the Reunification of Korea (North Korea)
- Democratic Front for the Liberation of Palestine
- Democratic Front (Peru)
- Democratic Front of National Unity (Peru)
- Democratic Front for the Liberation of Togo
- Sikkim Democratic Front (India)

== See also ==
- National Front (disambiguation)
- Popular Front (disambiguation)
- Progressive Democratic Front (disambiguation)
- United Front (disambiguation)
- Left Democratic Front (disambiguation)
- National Democratic Front (disambiguation)
