= Left Unity =

Left Unity may refer to:

- Left Unity (UK), a UK political party founded in 2013
- Left Unity (European Parliament), a grouping in the European Parliament which existed from 1989 to 1994
- Left Unity (Jawaharlal Nehru University), group of Indian left wing students' organisations at Jawaharlal Nehru University
- Workers' Party of Spain – Communist Unity, a tendency within the Spanish Socialist Workers' Party

== See also ==
- United Front (disambiguation)
- Popular Front (disambiguation)
