= NDF =

NDF or ndf may refer to:

== Arts and entertainment ==
- Neue Deutsche Filmgesellschaft, a German film production company; formed 1947
- Neutral-density filter, in photography

== Finance ==
- Non-deliverable forward
- Nordic Development Fund, a north European regional bank; formed 1989

== Organisations ==
=== Military ===
- National Defence Forces, Syria; active 2012–2024
- Norwegian Defence Force, Norway; formed 1628
- Namibian Defence Force, Namibia; formed 1990

=== Political ===
- National Democratic Force, Burma; formed 2010
- National Democratic Front (disambiguation); various parties, coalitions and militant groups
- National Development Front, South India; formed 1994

=== Non-profit ===
- Neighborhood Development Foundation, New Orleans, US
- Nordic Development Fund, a mutilateral state bank; formed 1989
- Norwegian Association of the Deaf (Norwegian: Norges Døveforbund; founded 1918

== Technology ==
- Neutral-density filter, in optics and photography
- Neutral detergent fiber, a fiber-evaluating method used in animal nutrition
- No defect found, things returned for repair not found to be faulty
- Non drop-frame, video type designation used in SMPTE timecode
