= FPHS =

FPHS may refer to:

== Schools ==
- Fair Park High School, Shreveport, Louisiana, United States
- Falinge Park High School, Rochdale, England
- Fisher Park High School, Ottawa, Ontario, Canada
- Forest Park High School (disambiguation)
- Franklin Pierce High School, Midland, Washington, United States

== Other uses ==
- Fellow of the Philosophical Society (FPhS)

== See also ==
- FPH (disambiguation)
