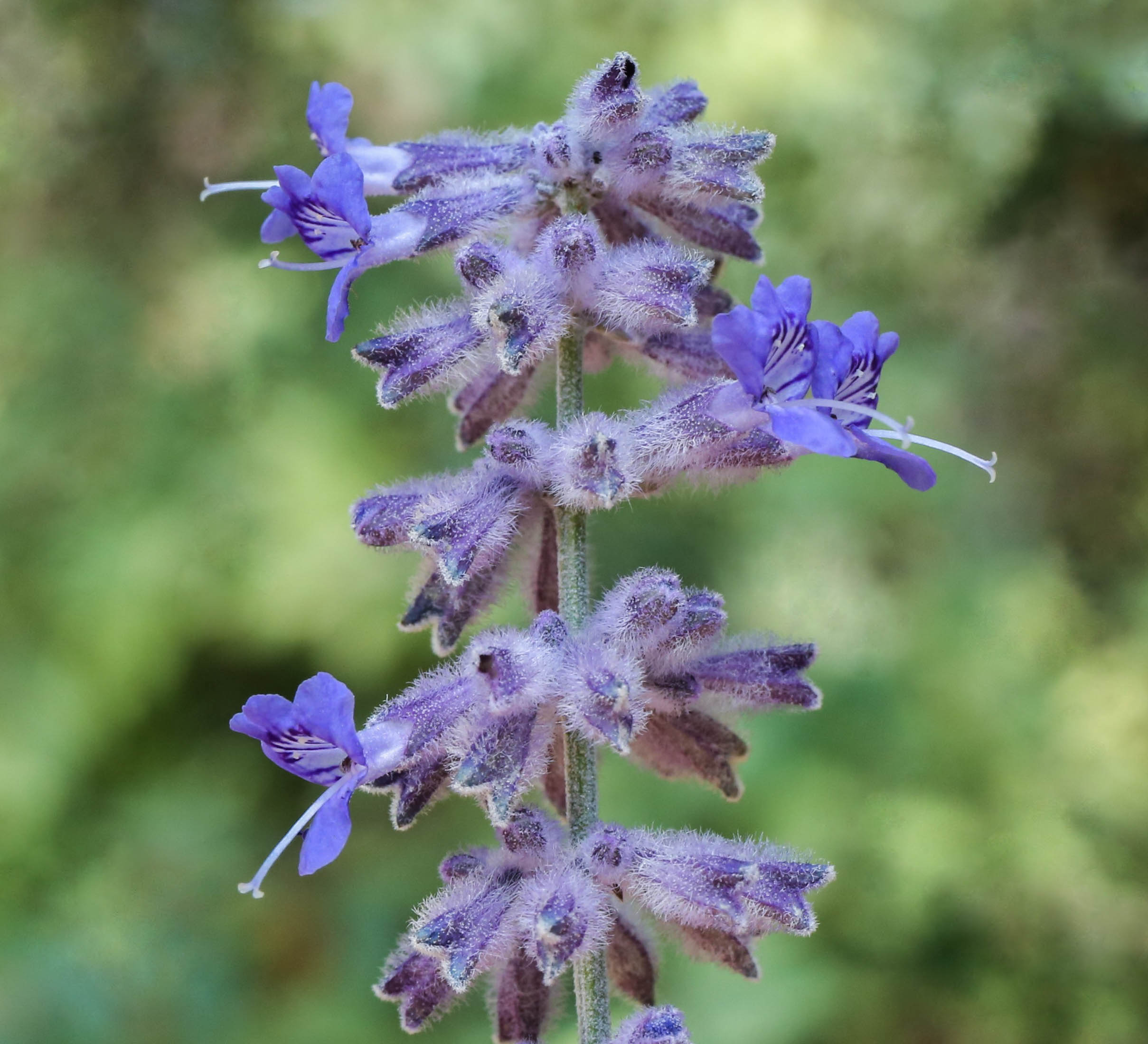
- 'Blue Spire' cultivar

Scientific classification
- Kingdom: Plantae
- Clade: Tracheophytes
- Clade: Angiosperms
- Clade: Eudicots
- Clade: Asterids
- Order: Lamiales
- Family: Lamiaceae
- Genus: Salvia
- Subgenus: Salvia subg. Perovskia
- Species: S. yangii

Binomial name
- Salvia yangii B.T.Drew

Synonyms
- Perovskia atriplicifolia Benth.; Perovskia pamirica Chang Y.Yang & B.Wang

= Salvia yangii =

Species of flowering plant in the mint family

Salvia yangii, previously known as Perovskia atriplicifolia (/pəˈrɒvskiə ætrɪplɪsɪˈfoʊliə/), and commonly called Russian sage, is a flowering herbaceous perennial plant and subshrub. Although not previously a member of Salvia, the genus widely known as sage, since 2017 it has been included within them. It has an upright habit, typically reaching 0.5–1.2 metres (1 1/2–4 feet) tall, with square stems and gray-green leaves that yield a distinctive odor when crushed. It is best known for its flowers. Its flowering season extends from mid-summer to late October, with blue to violet blossoms arranged into showy, branched panicles.

It is native to the steppes and hills of southwestern and central Asia. Successful over a wide range of climate and soil conditions, it has since become popular and widely planted. Several cultivars have been developed, differing primarily in leaf shape and overall height; 'Blue Spire' is the most common. This cultivar has been widely used in gardens and landscaping. S. yangii was the Perennial Plant Association's 1995 Plant of the Year, and the 'Blue Spire' cultivar received the Award of Garden Merit from the Royal Horticultural Society.

The species has a long history of use in traditional medicine in its native range, where it is employed as a treatment for a variety of ailments. This has led to the investigation of its phytochemistry. Its flowers can be eaten in salads or crushed for dyemaking, and the plant has been considered for potential use in the phytoremediation of contaminated soil.

== Description ==
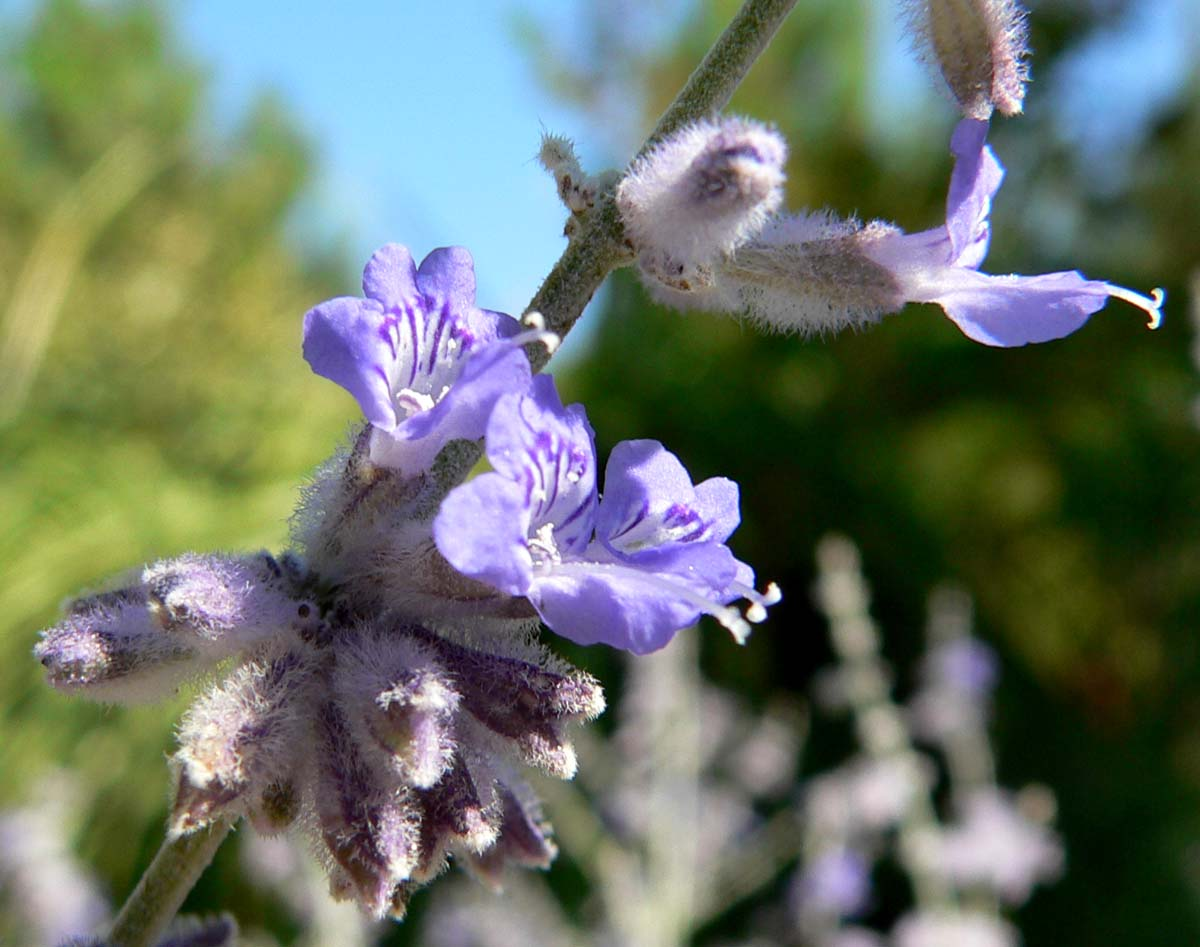
Flowers, showing the hair-covered calyx, tube-shaped corolla, and exserted style

Salvia yangii is a deciduous perennial subshrub with an erect to spreading habit. Superficially, it resembles a much larger version of lavender. Multiple branches arise from a shared rootstalk, growing to a height of 0.5–1.2 metres (1 1/2–4 feet), with occasional specimens reaching 1.5 m (5 ft). The mature plant may be 0.6–1.2 m (2–4 ft) across. The rigid stems are square in cross-section, and are covered by an indumentum formed by stellate, or star-shaped, trichomes and oil droplets. Especially during autumn, these hairs give the stems a silvery appearance.

The grayish-green leaves are arranged in opposite pairs, and attached to the stems by a short petiole. They are generally 3–5 centimetres (1 1/4–2 inches) long and 0.8–2 cm (1/4–3/4 in) wide, although narrower in some populations. The overall leaf shape is oblate, a rounded shape longer than it is wide, to lanceolate, shaped like the head of a lance. They are pinnatipartite, with a deeply incised leaf margin that may be either wavy or sharp-toothed; even within a single community of S. yangii, there can be considerable variation in the details of leaf shape. Leaves near the top of branches may merge into bracts. The foliage is aromatic, especially when crushed, with a fragrance described as sage-like, a blend of sage and lavender, or like turpentine.

The flowering season of S. yangii can be as long as June through October, although populations in some parts of its range, such as China, may bloom in a much more restricted period. The inflorescence is a showy panicle, 30–38 cm long (12–15 in), with many branches. Each of these branches is a raceme, with the individual flowers arranged in pairs called verticillasters. Each flower's calyx is purple, densely covered in white or purple hairs, and about 4 millimetres (1/8 in) long. The corolla is tube-shaped, formed from a four-lobed upper lip and a slightly shorter lower lip; the blue or violet blue petals are about 1 cm long. The style has been reported in both an exserted—extending beyond the flower's tube—form and one contained within the flower; all known examples of S. yangii in cultivation have exserted styles. Gardening author Neil Soderstrom describes the appearance of the flowers from a distance as "like a fine haze or fog".

The fruits develop about a month after flowering, and consist of dark brown oval nutlets, about 2 mm × 1 mm (2/25 in × 1/25 in).

=== Phytochemistry ===
The phytochemistry of Russian sage is under basic research. Analysis of its essential oil has identified over two dozen compounds, although the compounds detected and their relative prevalence have not been consistent. Most analyses have identified various monoterpenes and monoterpenoids as the dominant components, such as carene, eucalyptol, limonene, γ-terpinene, and (+)-β-thujone, although the essential oil of a sample from the Orto Botanico dell'Università di Torino had camphor as its most prevalent component. Other monoterpenes, camphene, α-pinene, and β-pinene are also present, as are sesquiterpenes such as γ-cadinene, δ-cadinene, trans-caryophyllene, and α-humulene. Several terpenoid alcohols—borneol, cedrol, and menthol—have been extracted, as have caffeic acid and ferulic acid. More complex compounds have been isolated, some of which were first identified in this manner, including perovskatone; the glycosides atriplisides A and B; and atricins A and B, a pair of triterpenes that are similar to oleanane. Four diterpene glucosides have been isolated by extraction.

=== Similar species ===
Nine species are recognised within Salvia subg. Perovskia. S. abrotanoides shares much of the range of S. yangii, but is distinguished by its bipinnate leaves. Hybrids between these two species may occur naturally. Restricted to Turkestan in its native range, P. scrophularifolia is less upright; some forms have white flowers. The flowers of P. scabiosifolia are yellow.

== Taxonomy ==
Salvia yangii was described, under the name Perovskia atriplicifolia, by George Bentham in 1848, based on a specimen collected by William Griffith in Afghanistan, now preserved at the Kew Gardens herbarium as the species's holotype. The specific epithet atriplicifolia means "with leaves like Atriplex", referring to its similarity to saltbush. While commonly known as Russian sage, S. yangii is not native to Russia.

A population collected in Taxkorgan Tajik Autonomous County, Kashgar Prefecture, Xinjiang, China was described as a separate species in 1987 and given the name Perovskia pamirica, but was later considered synonymous with P. atriplicifolia.

In 2017, P. atriplicifolia was transferred to the genus Salvia. The combinations Salvia atriplicifolia and Salvia pamirica, however, have already been preoccupied by distinct taxa, thus new specific epithet yangii, honouring Yang Changyou, one of the authors of P. pamirica, was given to the species.

=== Phylogenetics ===
- - - Salvia clade I
      - - - Other clade I Salvia
        - - S. lyrata
          - S. officinalis
      - - S. taraxacifolia
        - S. verticillata
    - - - S abrotanoides (Perovskia abrotanoides)
        - S. yangii (Perovskia atriplicifolia)
      - S. rosmarinus (Rosmarinus officinalis)
  - - Salvia clade II
- - Salvia clade III

Cladogram showing the phylogeny and relationships of S. yangii within part of Lamiaceae

Within the family Lamiaceae, the large genus Salvia had long been believed monophyletic, based on the structure of its stamens. Several smaller genera, including Dorystaechas, Perovskia, and Meriandra were also included in tribe Mentheae, but were thought to be more distantly related. In 2004, a molecular phylogenetics study based on two cpDNA genes (rbcL and trnL-F) demonstrated that Salvia is not monophyletic, but comprises three identifiable clades. Clade I is more closely related to Perovskia than to other members of Salvia.

S. yangii has been the subject of subsequent studies seeking to clarify the relationships within Mentheae. Further research combined palynological analysis of pollen grains with rbcL sequencing to provide additional support for the relationship between Perovskia and Salvia clade I. It also distinguished between S. yangii and S. abrotanoides, while confirming their close relationship. A subsequent multigene study (four cpDNA markers and two nrDNA markers) redrew parts of the Mentheae cladogram, making Rosmarinus a sister group to Perovskia.

=== Cultivars ===
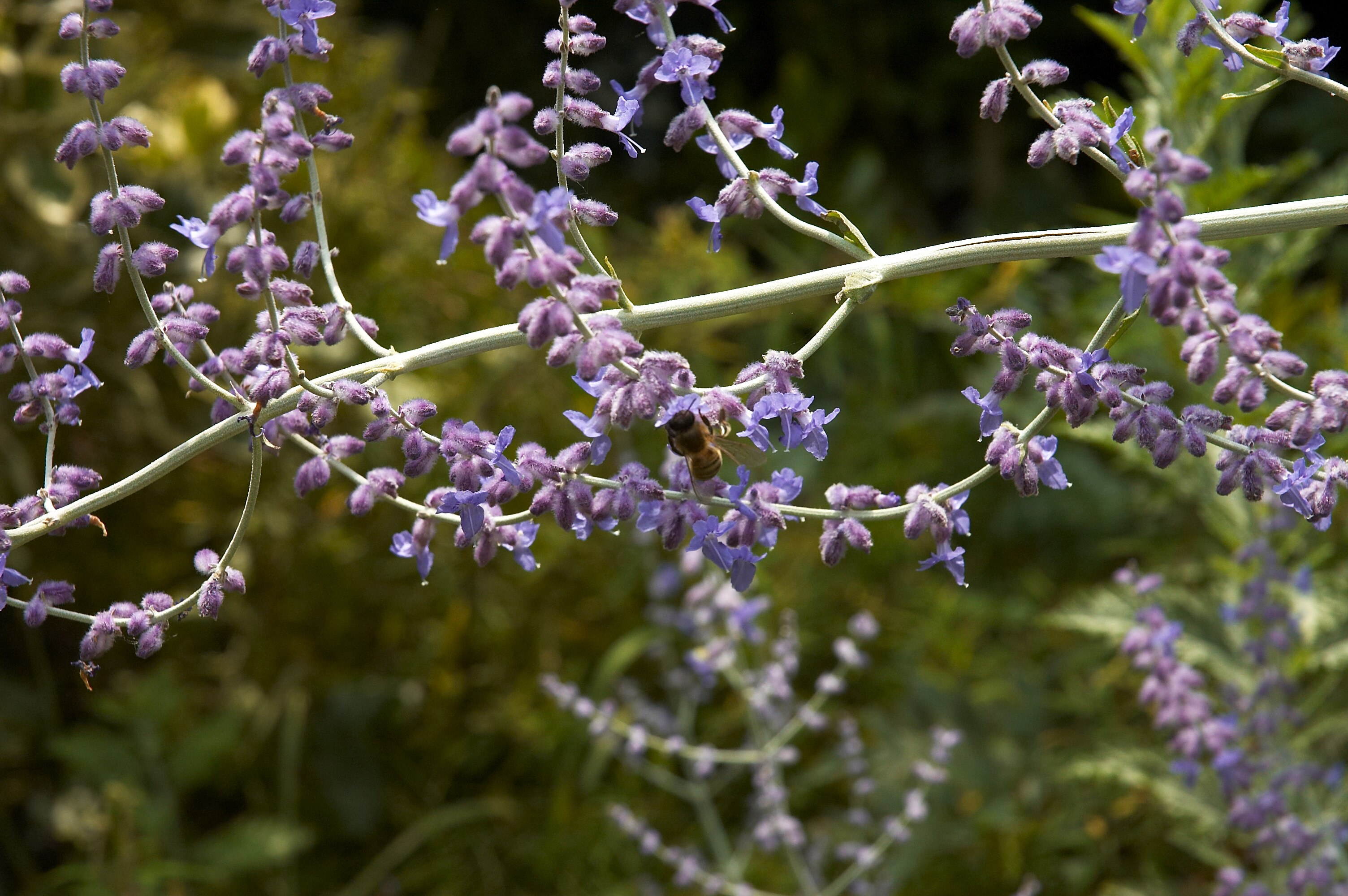
The 'Blue Spire' cultivar

Several cultivars of S. yangii have been developed. They are primarily distinguished by the height of mature plants and the depth of the leaf-margin incisions. Many of these cultivars, especially those with deeply incised leaves, may actually be hybrids of S. yangii and S. abrotanoides. In that context, some may be referred to by the hybrid name Perovskia ×hybrida.

The most common cultivar, 'Blue Spire', is among those suspected of being a hybrid. It was selected from German plantings by the British Notcutts Nurseries, and first exhibited in 1961. 'Blue Spire' grows to approximately 1.2 m (4 ft), and has large, darker blue flowers. In 1993, it received the Royal Horticultural Society's Award of Garden Merit.

'Filigran' reaches a height of 1.2 to 1.3 m (4 to 4 1/2 ft); this tall, sturdy cultivar's name is German for filigree, in reference to its lacy, fern-like foliage. 'Little Spire' is shorter, with a mature height of only 0.6 m (2 ft). 'Longin' is similar in height to 'Blue Spire' but more upright. Allan Armitage established the late-flowering cultivar 'Mystery of Knightshayes' from a plant at Knightshayes Court. Other cultivars include 'Blue Haze', 'Blue Mist', 'Hybrida' (also called 'Superba'), 'Lace', 'Lisslit', 'Rocketman', and 'WALPPB'.

== Distribution and habitat ==
Widely distributed across Asia in its native range, S. yangii grows in western China, northwestern India, Pakistan, Afghanistan, Iran, Turkey, and parts of eastern Europe. It is found in steppes and on hillsides, and grows at higher elevations in mountainous regions, including the Himalayas. It has been recorded at 10,000 ft (3,000 m) of altitude in the Karakoram. In Pakistan's Quetta district, it is often found in association with the grass Chrysopogon aucheri, and may serve as an indicator species for soils with low calcium carbonate and chloride availability. The harsh habitats preferred by S. yangii are comparable to the sagebrush steppe of North America.

== Ecology ==
In parts of its range, such as the Harboi, these steppe ecosystems are employed as rangeland for grazing animals such as sheep and goats, although this forage is generally of poor nutritional quality. S. yangii can serve as an important source of phosphorus and zinc, despite being high in poorly-digested material such as neutral detergent fiber and lignin.

== Cultivation ==
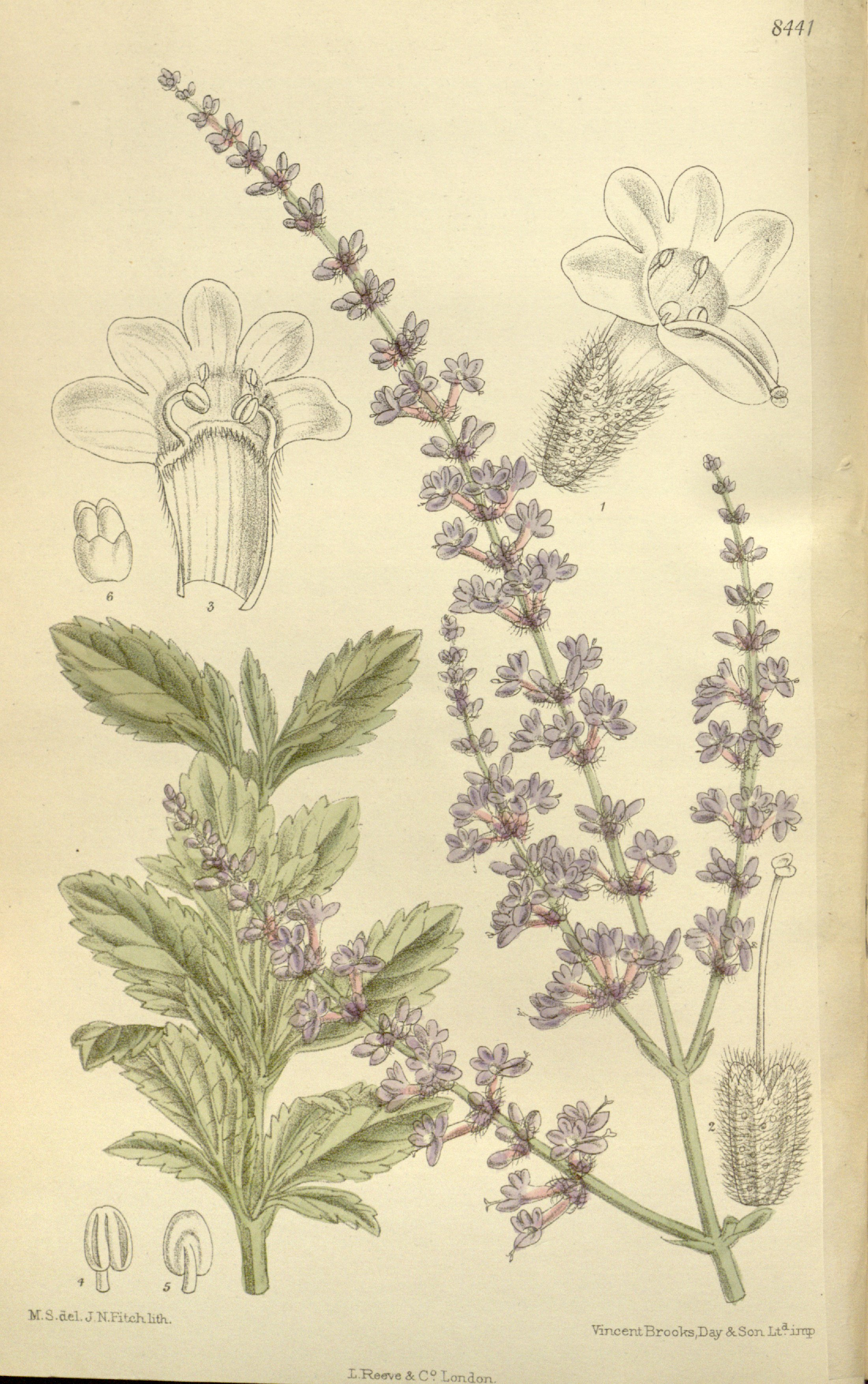
Illustration from Curtis's Botanical Magazine in 1912

Following its introduction to the United Kingdom in 1904, the Irish gardener and author William Robinson was immediately taken with the plant, which he described as being "worth a place in the choicest garden for its graceful habit and long season of beauty." The Royal Horticultural Society records the establishment of cultivars beginning with P. 'Hybrida', selected at a Hampshire nursery in the 1930s. By the late 1980s and early 1990s, S. yangii had gained widespread popularity, and in 1995, it was selected as the Perennial Plant Association's Plant of the Year.

The cultivar 'Blue Spire' has gained the Royal Horticultural Society's Award of Garden Merit.

=== Planting and care ===
Russian sage is a perennial plant suitable for a wide range of conditions, at least where its tendency to spread will not be a problem. The species prefers full sun. Specimens planted in partially shaded locations tend to spread or flop, although this behavior can be controlled somewhat by pinching young shoots or by providing a strong-standing accompaniment that the plant can drape itself around for support. Flowers bloom only on new growth. Plants trimmed to 15–61 cm (6–24 in) in early spring provide the best subsequent growth and flowering.

Tolerant of both heat and cold, it is grown in North America in United States Department of Agriculture hardiness zones three through nine, although some cultivars may be better suited than others to extremes of temperature. It is successfully grown from the southwestern United States, north and east across much of the country, and across the Canada–US border into Ontario and Quebec. In the coldest of these areas, it may require considerable protection to survive the winter. In the United Kingdom, the Royal Horticultural Society has assigned it hardiness rating H4, indicating that it tolerates temperatures as low as −10 to −5 °C (14 to 23 °F), hardy in most of the country through typical winters.

It also tolerates a variety of soil conditions. Although young specimens perform best when planted in a mixture of peat and either sand or perlite, S. yangii can thrive in sandy, chalky, or loamy soil, or heavy clay soil with sufficient drainage. It can endure a wide range of soil pH, as well as exposure to salty conditions near oceans. Its deep-feeding taproot makes it especially drought tolerant; for this reason it has seen wide use for xeriscaping in the Intermountain West. Overwatering and over-fertilization can damage its roots and lead to a rapid decline in health. S. yangii is otherwise generally free from plant pathogens. In cultivation, it is also rarely selected as forage by grazing animals, and so is considered both a deer-resistant and rabbit-resistant plant.

=== Landscaping ===
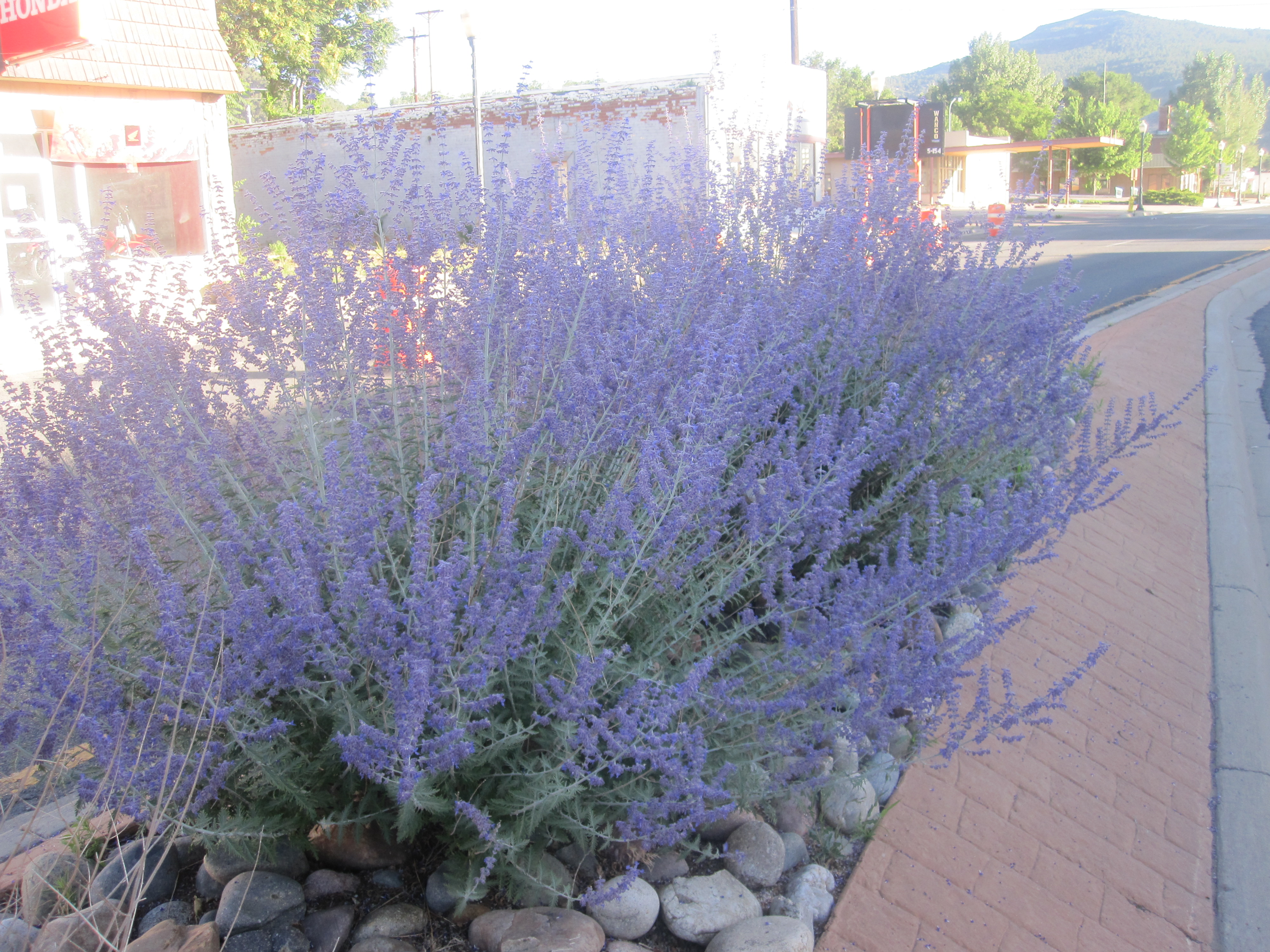
In Raton, New Mexico, showing the airy appearance of the plant

Russian sage has been praised for its usefulness in gardens and landscaping features. It is most commonly planted as an accent feature, such as an "island" in an expanse of lawn, but it can also be used as filler within a larger landscaping feature, or to enhance areas where the existing natural appearance is retained. Gardening author Troy Marden describes S. yangii as having a "see-through" quality that is ideal for borders. Some experts suggest groups of three plants provide the best landscape appearance. It is also suitable for container gardening. It does have an undesirable tendency to spread via rhizomes beyond it original planting.

It attracts bees, hummingbirds, and butterflies, and contributes color to gardens—both the blue of its late-season flowers, and the silvery colors of its winter stalks.

=== Propagation ===
Russian sage is frequently propagated by cuttings. Because its woody crown is resistant to division, softwood cuttings are taken from shoots near the base, generally in late spring. Hardwood cuttings selected in mid-to-late summer also provide a viable propagation technique. The plant is also grown from seed in cultivation. Such seeds require exposure to cold for 30–160 days to germinate, and seed-raised specimens may not preserve the characteristics of named cultivars. In the commercial greenhouse or nursery setting, its relatively large size and rapid growth can adversely affect quality or make plants more difficult and expensive to transport; the use of plant growth regulators such as chlormequat chloride and daminozide may be more cost-effective than large-scale pruning.

Some members of the Lamiaceae can spread unchecked and become invasive plants. Planting of Russian sage near wild lands has been discouraged by some gardening guides out of concern for its potential to spread, but it is not yet considered invasive, and has been suggested as a substitute for purple loosestrife for this reason.

== Uses ==
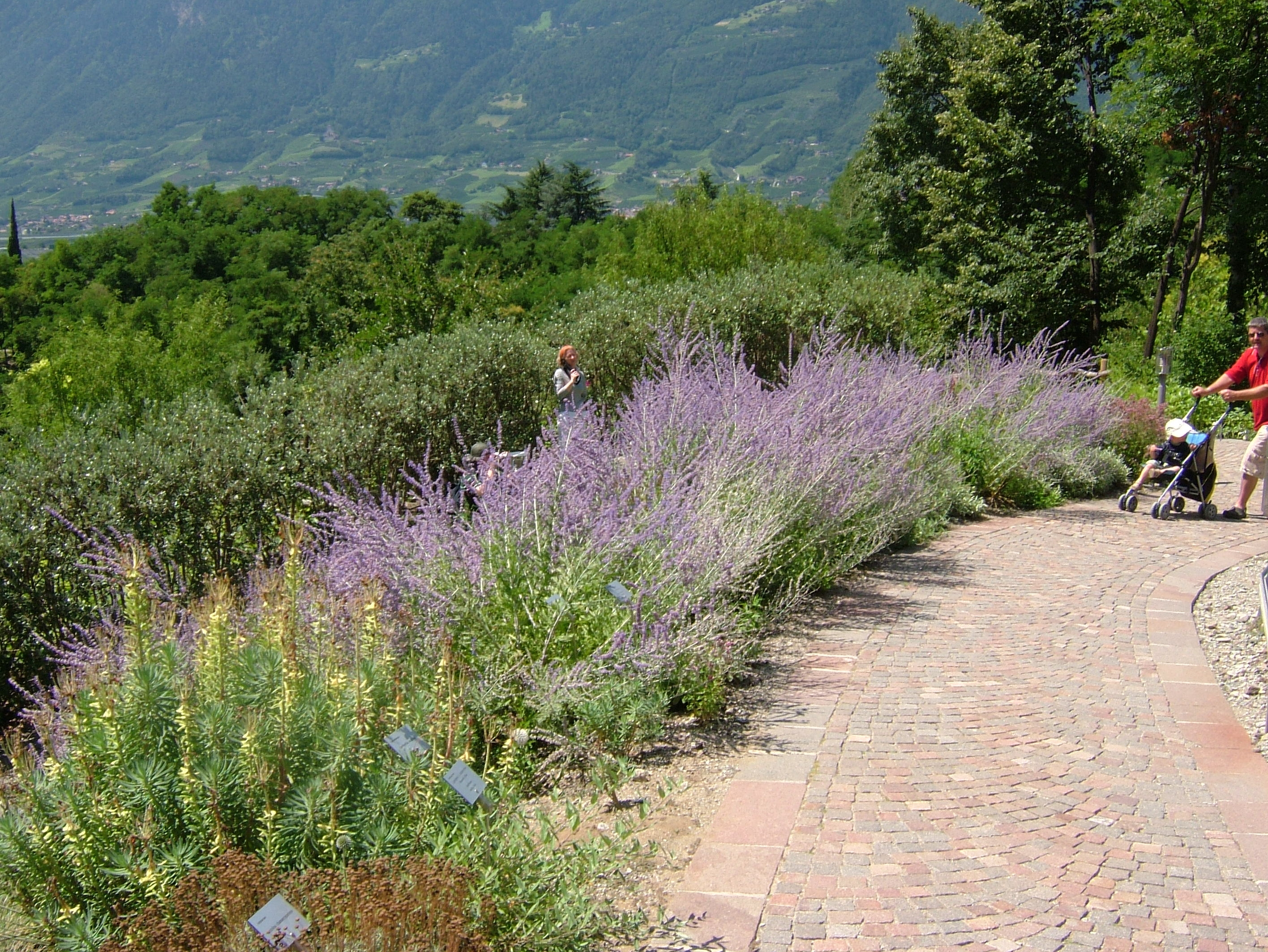
Used as a border in the Trauttmansdorff Castle Gardens, Italy

Russian sage has a long history of use in traditional medicine, and is smoked as a euphoriant.

In addition to its use in folk medicine, it is sometimes used in Russia to flavor a vodka-based cocktail. Its flowers are eaten in parts of Afghanistan and Pakistan, including Kashmir, adding a sweet flavor to salads.

This species is considered a candidate for use in phytoremediation because of its rapid growth, tolerance for harsh conditions, and ability to accumulate toxic heavy metals from polluted soil.

The essential oil can function as a biopesticide, especially regarding Tropidion castaneum beetles and Camponotus maculatus carpenter ants.

== Bibliography ==
- Ahmad, Ijaz; Fozia; Waheed, Abdul; Tahir, Nafisa Batool; Rais, Aisha Kalsoom (2015), "Anti-inflammatory constituents from Perovskia atriplicifolia", Pharmaceutical Biology, 53 (11): 1628–1631, doi:10.3109/13880209.2014.997250, PMID 25856716, S2CID 24997232
- Bentham, George (1848), "Labiatæ", in Candolle, Alphonse de (ed.), Prodromus Systematis Naturalis Regni Vegetabilis (in Latin), vol. 12, Victoris Masson, pp. 27–603
- "Russian sage: Perovskia atriplicifolia", Better Homes and Gardens
- Bost, Toby; Polomski, Bob (2012), Carolinas Gardener's Handbook, Cool Springs Press, ISBN 978-1-59186-539-1
- Bourne, Val (2007), "How to Grow: Russian Sage", The Telegraph
- Breen, Pat; Zanden, Ann Marie VanDer; Hilgert, Chris (2004), "Perovskia atriplicifolia", Landscape Plants: Images, Identification, and Information, Oregon State University Department of Horticulture
- Brickell, Christopher; Cole, Trevor (2002), The American Horticultural Society: Encyclopedia of Plants & Flowers, DK Publishing, ISBN 978-0-7894-8993-7
- Burnett, S.E.; Keever, G.J.; Gilliam, C.H.; Kessler, J.R. Jr. (2001), "Growth regulation of Russian sage during greenhouse and nursery production", Journal of Environmental Horticulture, 19 (1): 24–28, doi:10.24266/0738-2898-19.1.24
- Burrell, C. Colston (2002), The Sunny Border: Sun-Loving Perennials for Season-Long Color, 21st-Century Gardening, Brooklyn Botanic Garden, ISBN 978-1-889538-53-2
- Calhoun, Scott (2012), Designer Plant Combinations: 105 Stunning Gardens Using Six Plants or Fewer, Storey Publishing, ISBN 978-1-60342-004-4
- Cox, Jeff (2002), Perennial All Stars: The 150 Best Perennials for Great-Looking, Trouble-Free Gardens, Rodale Press, ISBN 978-0-87596-889-6
- Cretti, John; Newcomer, Mary Ann (2012), Rocky Mountain Gardener's Handbook, Cool Springs Press, ISBN 978-1-61058-819-5
- "Perovskia atriplicifolia", Curtis's Botanical Magazine, Fourth series, 8 (90), 1912
- Diblik, Roy (2014), The Know Maintenance Perennial Garden, Timber Press, ISBN 978-1-60469-334-8
- DiSabato-Aust, Tracy (2006), The Well-tended Perennial Garden: Planting & Pruning Techniques (Expanded ed.), Timber Press, ISBN 978-0-88192-803-7
- Drew, Bryan T.; Sytsma, Kenneth J. (2012), "Phylogenetics, biogeography, and staminal evolution in the tribe Mentheae (Lamiaceae)", American Journal of Botany, 99 (5): 933–953, Bibcode:2012AmJB...99..933D, doi:10.3732/ajb.1100549, PMID 22539517
- Dumitraşcu, M. (2008), "Vegetative propagation of Perovskia atriplicifolia", Acta Horticulturae, 766 (766): 215–218, doi:10.17660/ActaHortic.2008.766.28
- Eisenman, Sasha W.; Zaurov, David E.; Struwe, Lena, eds. (2012), Medicinal Plants of Central Asia: Uzbekistan and Kyrgyzstan (2013 ed.), Springer, ISBN 978-1-4614-3911-0
- Erdemgil, Fatma Zerrin; Ilhan, Semra; Korkmaz, Ferhan; Kaplan, Cigdem; Mercangöz, Ayse; Arfan, Mohammad; Ahmad, Shabir (2007), "Chemical composition and biological activity of the essential oil of Perovskia atriplicifolia from Pakistan", Pharmaceutical Biology, 45 (4): 324–331, doi:10.1080/13880200701212890, S2CID 95671085
- Gardiner, Jim (2014), The Timber Press Encyclopedia of Flowering Shrubs, Timber Press, ISBN 978-1-60469-395-9
- Gardner, Jo Ann (1998), Herbs in Bloom: A Guide to Growing Herbs as Ornamental Plants, Timber Press, ISBN 978-0-88192-698-9
- Grant, Mike (2007), Perovskia, RHS Plant Trials and Assessments, Royal Horticultural Society
- Greet, Brandon (Spring 2013), "Keeping Wyoming safe from invasion: Identifying potential weed problems", Barnyards & Backyards: 25
- Harrison, Lorraine (2012), RHS Latin for Gardeners, Mitchell Beazley, ISBN 978-1-84533-731-5
- Hedge, Ian Charleson (1990), Flora of Pakistan 192, Labiatae, University of Karachi, OCLC 917314877
- Henehan, Rita C. (2008), The Michigan Gardener's Companion: An Insider's Guide to Gardening in the Great Lakes State, Globe Pequot, ISBN 978-0-7627-4509-8
- Hightower, Steven, "Perovskia", Sonoma County Master Gardeners, University of California
- Hodgson, Larry (2000), Perennials For Every Purpose: Choose the Plants You Need for Your Conditions, Your Garden, and Your Taste, Rodale, ISBN 978-0-87596-823-0
- Hussain, Farrukh; Durrani, Mufakhirah Jan (2008), "Mineral composition of some range grasses and shrubs from Harboi rangeland Kalat, Pakistan" (PDF), Pakistan Journal of Botany, 40 (6): 2513–2523
- Hussain, Farrukh; Durrani, Mufakhirah Jan (2009), "Nutritional evaluation of some forage plants from Harboi rangeland, Kalat, Pakistan" (PDF), Pakistan Journal of Botany, 41 (3): 1137–1154
- Jassbi, Amir Reza; Ahmad, Viqar Uddin; Tareen, Rasool Bakhsh (1999), "Constituents of the essential oil of Perovskia atriplicifolia Benth", Flavour and Fragrance Journal, 14 (1): 38–40, doi:10.1002/(SICI)1099-1026(199901/02)14:1<38::AID-FFJ778>3.0.CO;2-8
- Jiang, Zhi-Yong; Huang, Chao-Guan; Xiong, Hua-Bin; Tian, Kai; Liu, Wen-Xing; Hu, Qiu-Fen; Wang, Hong-Bin; Yang, Guang-Yu; Huang, Xiang-Zhong (2013), "Perovskatone A: A novel C_{23} terpenoid from Perovskia atriplicifolia", Tetrahedron Letters, 54 (29): 3886–3888, doi:10.1016/j.tetlet.2013.05.056
- Jiang, Zhi-Yong; Yu, Yi-Jiang; Huang, Chao-Guan; Huang, Xiang-Zhong; Hu, Qiu-Fen; Yang, Guang-Yu; Wang, Hong-Bin; Zhang, Xiang-Yu; Li, Gan-Peng (2015), "Icetexane diterpenoids from Perovskia atriplicifolia", Planta Medica, 81 (3): 241–246, Bibcode:2015PlMed..81..241J, doi:10.1055/s-0034-1396151, PMID 25611748, S2CID 11147205
- Jiang, Zhi-Yong; Zhou, Jun; Huang, Chao-Guan; Hu, Qiu-Fen; Huang, Xiang-Zhong; Wang, Wei; Zhang, Li-Zhu; Li, Gan-Peng; Xia, Fu-Ting (2015), "Two novel antiviral terpenoids from the cultured Perovskia atriplicifolia", Tetrahedron, 71 (23): 3844–3849, doi:10.1016/j.tet.2015.04.017
- Kahtz, Anthony W. (2008), Perennials for Midwestern Gardens: Proven Plants for the Heartland, Timber Press, ISBN 978-0-88192-893-8
- Keys, Andrew; Michaels, Kerry (2015), Growing the Northeast Garden, Timber Press, ISBN 978-1-60469-680-6
- Kingsbury, Noel (2014), Gardening with Perennials: Lessons from Chicago's Lurie Garden, University of Chicago Press, ISBN 978-0-226-11855-0
- Kintzios, Spiridon E. (2000), "Preface", in Kintzios, Spiridon E. (ed.), Sage: The Genus Salvia, Harwood Academic Publishers, pp. xi–xv, ISBN 978-90-5823-005-8
- Lacey, Stephen (1995), Scent in Your Garden, Frances Lincoln, ISBN 978-0-7112-1044-8
- Li, Hsi-wen (Xiwen) [in Spanish]; Hedge, Ian C. (1994), "Perovskia atriplicifolia", in Wu, Zheng-yi; Raven, Peter H. (eds.), Flora of China, vol. 17 (Verbenaceae through Solanaceaea), Science Press and Missouri Botanical Garden Press, ISBN 978-0-915279-24-1 PDF.
- Lowe, Judy (2012), Tennessee & Kentucky Garden Guide, Garden Guides (2nd ed.), Cool Springs Press, ISBN 978-1-59186-537-7
- Mani, M. S. (1978), Ecology and Phytogeography of High Altitude Plants of the Northwest Himalaya: Introduction to High Altitude Botany, Halsted Press, ISBN 978-0-412-15710-3
- Marden, Troy B. (2014), Southern Gardener's Handbook, Cool Springs Press, ISBN 978-1-59186-592-6
- "Perovskia atriplicifolia", Plant Finder, Missouri Botanical Garden
- "Perovskia atriplicifolia 'Lisslitt' Lacey Blue", Plant Finder, Missouri Botanical Garden
- "Perovskia atriplicifolia 'Rocketman'", Plant Finder, Missouri Botanical Garden
- "Perovskia atriplicifolia 'WALPPB' Peek-A-Blue", Plant Finder, Missouri Botanical Garden
- Moon, Hye-Kyoung; Vinckier, Stefan; Walker, Jay B.; Smets, Erik; Huysmans, Suzy (2008), "A search for phylogenetically informative pollen characteristics in the subtribe Salviinae (Mentheae: Lamiaceae)", International Journal of Plant Sciences, 169 (3): 455–471, doi:10.1086/526463, S2CID 13442689
- Munts, Pat; Mulvihill, Susan (2014), Northwest Gardener's Handbook, Cool Springs Press, ISBN 978-1-59186-606-0
- Perovskia atriplicifolia: 1995 Perennial Plant of the Year, Perennial Plant Association, archived from the original on December 10, 2015
- Perveen, Shagufta; Khan, Sher Bahadar; Malik, Abdul; Tareen, Rasool Bakhsh; Nawaz, Sarfraz Ahmed; Choudhary, Muhammad Iqbal (2006), "Phenolic constituents from Perovskia atriplicifolia", Natural Product Research, 20 (4): 347–353, doi:10.1080/14786410500463205, PMID 16644529, S2CID 20245160
- Perveen, Shagufta; Malik, Abdul; Tareen, Rasool Bakhsh (2009), "Structural determination of atricins A and B, new triterpenes from Perovskia atriplicifolia, by 1D and 2D NMR spectroscopy", Magnetic Resonance in Chemistry, 47 (3): 266–269, doi:10.1002/mrc.2364, PMID 18991320, S2CID 38462642
- Perveen, Shagufta; Malik, Abdul; Tareen, Rasool Bakhsh; Afza, Nighat; Iqbal, Lubna (2014), "Atriplisides A and B, two new glycosides from Perovskia atriplicifolia", Zeitschrift für Naturforschung B, 62 (6): 863–867, doi:10.1515/znb-2007-0617
- Pippen, Laurie (2015), Laurie Pippen's All Natural Colorants for Cosmetic, Culinary, and Textile Dyeing, Eiram Publishing, ISBN 978-1-933039-74-9
- Proctor, Rob (1999), Denver Water: Xeriscape Plant Guide: 100 Water-Wise Plants for Gardens and Landscapes, Fulcrum Publishing, ISBN 978-1-55591-253-6
- Rice, Graham (2013), "RHS overhauls its plant awards system", The Telegraph
- Rose, Nancy; Selinger, Don; Whitman, John (2011), Growing Shrubs and Small Trees in Cold Climates (Revised and Updated ed.), University of Minnesota Press, ISBN 978-1-4529-3305-4
- Roth, Sally; Courtier, Jane (2015), Essential Perennials for Every Garden: Selection, Care, and Profiles to over 110 Easy Care Plants, i5 Publishing, ISBN 978-1-62008-168-6
- Roy, B.; Halder, A.C.; Pal, D.C. (1998), Plants for Human Consumption in India, Flora of India, Botanical Survey of India, OCLC 41532488
- "Record: Herbarium:K000929655 | Occurrence record", Data Portal, Royal Botanical Gardens, Kew, archived from the original on December 3, 2023 - Mirrors: GBIF & JSTOR Global Plants
- "Perovskia", The Plant List, Royal Botanical Gardens, Kew and Missouri Botanical Garden
- Perovskia atriplicifolia, Royal Horticultural Society
- Perovskia atriplicifolia Blue Spire, Royal Horticultural Society
- Sahayaraj, K. (2014), Basic and Applied Aspects of Biopesticides, Springer, ISBN 978-81-322-1877-7
- "Salvia yangii B.T.Drew", Plants of the World Online, Royal Botanic Gardens, Kew
- Sanecki, Kay Naylor (1975), The Pictorial Guide to Garden Flowers, Castle Books, ISBN 978-0-89009-029-9
- Schneller, Lee (2012), The Ever-Blooming Flower Garden: A Blueprint for Continuous Color, Storey Publishing, ISBN 978-1-60342-652-7
- Severa, Joan (1999), Stoga, Stan (ed.), Creating a Perennial Garden in the Midwest, Big Earth Publishing, ISBN 978-0-915024-73-5
- Shonle, Irene (2010), Non-Native Invasive Plants, Colorado State University Cooperative Extension
- Singer, Carolyn (2006), Deer in My Garden: Vol. 1: Perennials & Subshrubs, Greenleaf, ISBN 978-0-9774251-0-5
- Soderstrom, Neil (2009), Deer-Resistant Landscaping: Proven Advice and Strategies for Outwitting Deer and 20 Other Pesky Mammals, Rodale, ISBN 978-1-60529-667-8
- Squire, David (2007), The Propagation Specialist: The Essential Guide to Raising New Plants for the Home and Garden, New Holland Publishers, ISBN 978-1-84537-484-6
- Tarawneh, Amer; León, Francisco; Pettaway, Sara; Elokely, Khaled M.; Klein, Michael L.; Lambert, Janet; Mansoor, Arsala; Cutler, Stephen J. (2015), "Flavonoids from Perovskia atriplicifolia and their in vitro displacement of the respective radioligands for human opioid and cannabinoid receptors", Journal of Natural Products, 78 (6): 1461–1465, Bibcode:2015JNAtP..78.1461T, doi:10.1021/acs.jnatprod.5b00218, PMID 26035635
- Tareen, Rasool Bakhsh; Bibi, Tahira; Khan, Mir Ajab; Ahmad, Mushtaq; Zafar, Muhammad (2010), "Indigenous knowledge of folk medicine by the women of Kalat and Kuzhdar Regions of Balochistan, Pakistan" (PDF), Pakistan Journal of Botany, vol. 42, no. 3, pp. 1465–1485
- Tareen, Rasool Bakhsh; Qadir, S.A. (1991), "Phytosociology of the hills of Quetta District" (PDF), Pakistan Journal of Botany, 23 (1): 90–114
- Tenenbaum, Frances (2003), Taylor's Encyclopedia of Garden Plants, Houghton Mifflin Harcourt, ISBN 978-0-618-22644-3
- Vinson, Katherine; Zheng, Youbin (2012), "Session 2R: Plant Performance Research 2: Selection of Plant Species and Species Combinations for Northern Climates" (PDF), 10 Cities Alive: 10th Annual Green Roof and Wall Conference, archived from the original (PDF) on September 23, 2015
- Walker, Jay B.; Sytsma, Kenneth J.; Treutlein, Jens; Wink, Michael (2004), "Salvia (Lamiaceae) is not monophyletic: Implications for the systematics, radiation, and ecological specializations of Salvia and tribe Mentheae", American Journal of Botany, 91 (7): 1115–1125, Bibcode:2004AmJB...91.1115W, doi:10.3732/ajb.91.7.1115, PMID 21653467
- Weiseman, Daniel; Halsey, Daniel; Ruddock, Bryce (2014), Integrated Forest Gardening: The Complete Guide to Polycultures and Plant Guilds in Permaculture Systems, Chelsea Green Publishing, ISBN 978-1-60358-497-5
- Winter, Norman (2009), Captivating Combinations, University Press of Mississippi, ISBN 978-1-60473-475-1
- Yang, Chang-you; Wang, Bin (1987), "新疆唇形科新植物. Taxa nova labiatarum Xinjiangensium", Bulletin of Botanical Research (in Chinese), 7 (1): 95–103
- Yemm, Helen (2003), "How to Grow: Perovskia", The Telegraph
- Zamfirache, Maria Magdalena; Burzo, Ioan; Gostin, Irina; Stefan, Marius; Padurariu, Claudia; Olteanu, Zenovia; Badea, Monica Liminita; Lamban, Carmen; Truta, Elena; Ivanescu, Lacramioara; Cojocaru, Dumitru (2011), "Micromorphological traits and biochemical pattern of Perovskia atriplicifolia Benth., plant with phytoremediative potential", Carpathian Journal of Earth and Environmental Sciences, 6 (2): 261–268
- Zamfirache, Maria-Magdalena; Burzo, Ioan; Padurariu, Claudia; Boz, Irina; Andro, A; Badea, Monica Luminita; Olteanu, Zenovia; Lamban, Carmen; Truta, Elena (2010), "Studies regarding the chemical composition of volatile oils from some spontaneous and cultivated Lamiaceae species" (PDF), Scientific Annals of Alexandru Ioan Cuza University of Iasi, New Series, Section 2: Vegetal Biology, 56 (1): 43–49
