= National Resistance Front (disambiguation) =

The National Resistance Front is an Afghan resistance military organization created in 2021.

National Resistance Front may also refer to:

- National Popular Resistance Front, Honduran political coalition
- National Resistance Front of São Tomé and Príncipe, political party in São Tomé and Príncipe

== See also ==
- National Front (disambiguation)
  - National Front (French Resistance)
- Popular Front (disambiguation)
- United Front (disambiguation)
