= Banana Kong =

2013 video game

- Developer: Gamaga
- Publisher: FDG Entertainment
- Platforms: Android, iOS
- Release: January 24, 2013
- Genre: Endless runner
- Mode: Single-player

Banana Kong is an endless runner video game developed by FDG Entertainment for Android and iOS. It was released on January 24, 2013. In the game, the player controls a gorilla who runs from an endless wave of banana peels.

== Gameplay ==
In Banana Kong, the player controls a gorilla that is sprinting away from a wave of banana peels. The player controls the game by tapping the screen of their device to jump. Collecting bananas while sprinting charges a power bar. When the power bar is full, the character can thrust forward by swiping right, allowing the gorilla to get further away from the tsunami and break certain obstacles. The main gameplay area is a jungle, but other areas, including a cavern, ocean, beach, and treetops, can be accessed at different points in the game. Each area has a specific pet that aids the player: the toucan, the boar, the turtle, the snake, and the giraffe.

The objective of the game is to progress further by avoiding all of the obstacles. Being overrun by the bananas or crashing into something ends an individual run. The game gets faster the longer it is played, increasing the difficulty level. At the end of a run, the player can use their bananas to purchase upgrades, allowing for longer runs, and fueling another wave of peels in the process. There are also objectives that can be completed during single or multiple runs.

== Reception ==
The application has been downloaded by 100+ million users and has an average Google Play Store rating of 4.4 stars out of 5.

Reception

Review scores
Publication	Score
Gamezebo	4/5
IGN	6/10

Banana Kong has received generally positive reviews from critics. Nadia Oxford from Gamezebo praised the game, calling it "unbelievably addictive, immediately accessible, and enjoyable every time you pick it up". IGN's Justin Davis was more critical, noting its "cute" presentation and "easy-to-master controls", but finding it "nothing special" in comparison to other endless running games.

It holds a rating of 4.6 stars based on 4,864,032 votes on similarweb.

== Legacy ==
A sequel, Banana Kong 2, was released to Android and iOS devices on July 12, 2022. It features more maps, animal characters, new events, and improved graphics.
