= 2001 Mauritanian parliamentary election =

- 19 October 2001 (first round); 26 October 2001 (second round)
- All 81 seats in the National Assembly; 41 seats needed for a majority
- Turnout: 54.45% (▲2.39pp)
Party	Leader	Seats	+/–
PRDS	Maaouya Ould Sid'Ahmed Taya	64	−6
AC	Messaoud Ould Boulkheir	4	+3
RDU	Ahmed Ould Sidi Baba	3	+2
UDP	Naha Mint Mouknass	3	+3
RFD	Ahmed Ould Daddah	3	+3
UFP	Mohamed Ould Maouloud	3	+3
FP	Med. Lemine Ch'bih O. Cheikh Melainine	1	New
This lists parties that won seats. See the complete results below.
Prime Minister before	Prime Minister-designate
Cheikh El Avia Ould Mohamed Khouna; PRDS	Cheikh El Avia Ould Mohamed Khouna; PRDS

Parliamentary elections were held in Mauritania on 19 and 26 October 2001. The ruling party, President Maaouya Ould Sid'Ahmed Taya's Republican Party for Democracy and Renewal, won 51% of the vote, resulting in a landslide victory, with the party taking 64 of the 81 seats.

== Background ==
Previous elections since the reintroduction of multi-party politics in the early 1990s has seen opposition boycotts due to accusations of the incumbent government rigging the results. However, a new computerised ID system was introduced before the 2001 elections, resulting in opposition parties contesting the elections.

== Results ==
Party	Votes	%	Seats
Democratic and Social Republican Party			64
Rally for Democracy and Unity			3
Union for Democracy and Progress			3
Rally of Democratic Forces			3
Action for Change			4
Union of the Forces of Progress			3
Mauritanian Popular Front			1
Total			81
Total votes	560,045	–	
Registered voters/turnout	1,028,630	54.45	
Source: IPU
