= National Resistance =

National Resistance may refer to:

- Any resistance movement that seeks the "liberation" of territory from perceived foreign occupation
- Resistance during World War II in particular
  - French resistance
  - Greek resistance
- National Resistance Forces
- National Resistance (El Salvador)

== See also ==
- National Resistance Front (disambiguation)
