= National People's Front =

National People's Front may refer to:

- National People's Front (South Africa), a South African political party
- Rashtriya Lok Morcha, an Indian political party
- Rastriya Janamorcha, a communist political party in Nepal

== See also ==
- People's Front (disambiguation)
