= Frente Nacional =

The name Frente Nacional (Spanish for "National Front") may refer to:

- The Frente Nacional founded by Blas Piñar, which existed between 1983 and 1993: National Front (Spain, 1986)
- The unrelated Frente Nacional founded by José Fernando Cantalapiedra in 2006: National Front (Spain, 2006)
- National Front (Colombia)

== See also ==
- National Front (disambiguation)
