= Ripe bananas =

Tropical, stable fruit

Ripe bananas belong to the genus "Musa". The stage at which they reach physiological maturity is referred to as the 'fruit'.

== Stages ==
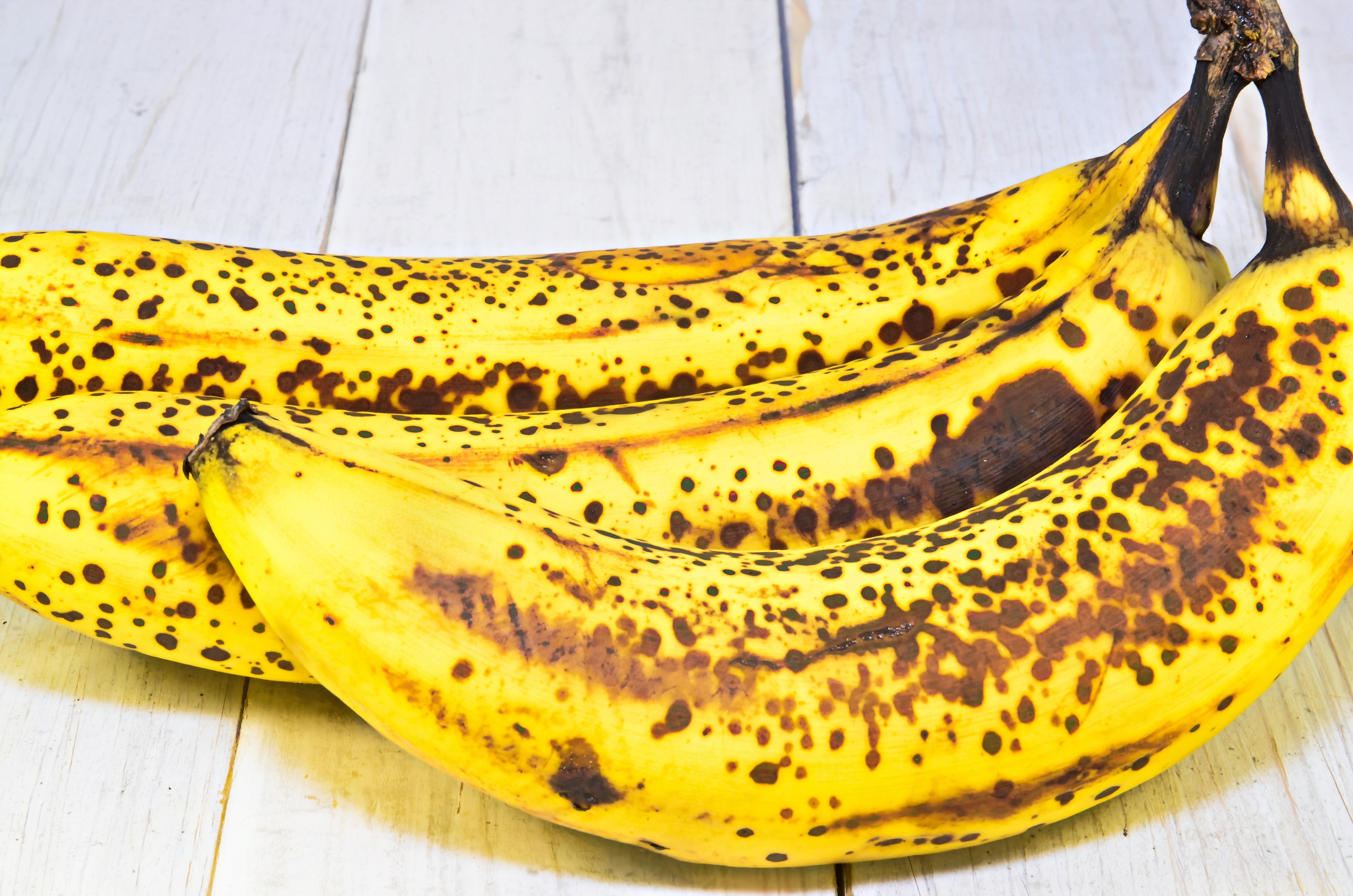
full ripped banana

Before a raw banana becomes a fully ripened fruit, it passes through several stages (corresponding to stage 6 or 7 on ripening charts). At this stage, enzymes—triggered by ethylene gas—convert most of the complex, resistant starches within the fruit into simple sugars (sucrose, glucose, and fructose). This process results in a sweet taste, a distinctive aroma, and a soft texture.

- Stages 1–4: Entirely green to greenish yellow – Unripe stage: High in resistant starch, firm in texture, and suitable for cooking.
- Stage 5: Yellow with green tips – Ripening stage: Firm to the bite, with a mildly sweet taste. Suitable for retail display.
- Stage 6: Fully bright yellow Ripe stage (the best stage for consumption; soft, sweet, and the peel is easy to remove. Excellent for eating as is.)
- Stage 7: Yellow with brown spots – This is the fully ripened stage. Since all the starch has converted into sugar, it possesses maximum sweetness and aroma.

As a raw banana ripens into a banana, the complex starches it contains are converted into easily digestible natural sugars (sucrose, glucose, and fructose).

== Nutrients ==
Nutrients include:

90% ripped banana

- Calories: Approximately 105–110 kcal.
- Carbohydrates: 27–28 grams (including about 14–15 grams of natural sugar).
- Dietary fiber: 3 grams (pectin and soluble fiber).
- Potassium: 422–450 mg (about 9–10% of the daily requirement).
- Vitamin B6: About 20%–25% of the daily requirement.
- Vitamin C: 10.3 mg (about 11–12% of the daily requirement).
- Magnesium & Manganese: 8% and 13% of the daily requirement, respectively

== See also ==
- Banana leaf
- Banana peel
