= People's Liberation Front =

The People's Liberation Front can refer to several political groups:

- People's Liberation Front (Yugoslavia), the World War II Yugoslav coalition of political parties.
- People's Liberation Front (Sri Lanka), a Sri Lankan Marxist political party and a former militant organization
- Eelam People's Revolutionary Liberation Front, a Sri Lankan political party formed as a militant group.
- Eritrean People's Liberation Front (EPLF), an armed organization that fought for the independence of Eritrea from Ethiopia
- Tigray People's Liberation Front (TPLF), a political party in Ethiopia that is the main part of the Ethiopian People's Revolutionary Democratic Front
- Khmer People's National Liberation Front (KPNLF), a political front organized in 1979 in opposition to the Vietnamese-installed People's Republic of Kampuchea (PRK) regime in Cambodia
- Namibia People's Liberation Front, an alliance of moderate political parties in Namibia
- North Korean People's Liberation Front, a group based in South Korea
- People's Liberation Front (Poland), a Polish anarchist militant group
- Revolutionary People's Liberation Party/Front, Turkish militant organization

== See also ==
- People's Front (disambiguation)
- Popular Front
- The Popular Front (disambiguation)
