= People's Front =

People's Front may refer to:

== Political organisations ==
- All-Russia People's Front (Общероссийский народный фронт)
- People's Front (Argentina)
- People's Front (Bosnia and Herzegovina) (Народни Фронт)
- People's Front (Canada)
- People's Front (Georgia) (სახალხო ფრონტი)
- People's Front (Iceland) (Alþýðufylkingin)
- People's Front (Mauritania) (Front Populaire)
- People's Front (Nepal) (जनमोर्चा नेपाल)
- People's Front (Peru) (Frente popular)
- People's Front (Singapore) (simplified Chinese: 人民阵线; traditional Chinese: 人民陣線; Malay: Barisan Rakyat)
- People's Front (Sweden) (Folkfronten)
- Popular Front (Tunisia) (Front populaire pour la réalisation des objectifs de la révolution)
- People's Front (Turkey) (Halk Cephesi)
- People's Front (Ukraine) (Народний фронт)
- People's Front (Yugoslavia) (Serbo-Croatian: Narodni Front; Slovenian: Ljudska fronta)
- Jan Morcha (India)
- Odisha Jan Morcha (India)

== Other uses ==
- People's Front of Judea and Judean People's Front, fictional organisations in Monty Python's Life of Brian

== See also ==
- People's Liberation Front (disambiguation)
- Popular Front (disambiguation)
- National People's Front (disambiguation)
