= Progressive Democratic Front =

Progressive Democratic Front may refer to:

- Progressive Democratic Front (Andhra Pradesh), India
- Progressive Democratic Front (Uttarakhand), India
- Republican Progressive Democratic Front, Italy

== See also ==
- Democratic Front (disambiguation)
- Left Democratic Front (disambiguation)
