= National Front Party =

National Front Party may refer to several different political parties:

- National Front Party (Albania)
- National Front Party (Egypt)
- National Front Party (Indonesia)
- National Front Party (Iran)
- National Front Party (Libya)
- National Front Party (Papua New Guinea)

== See also ==
- National Front (disambiguation)
