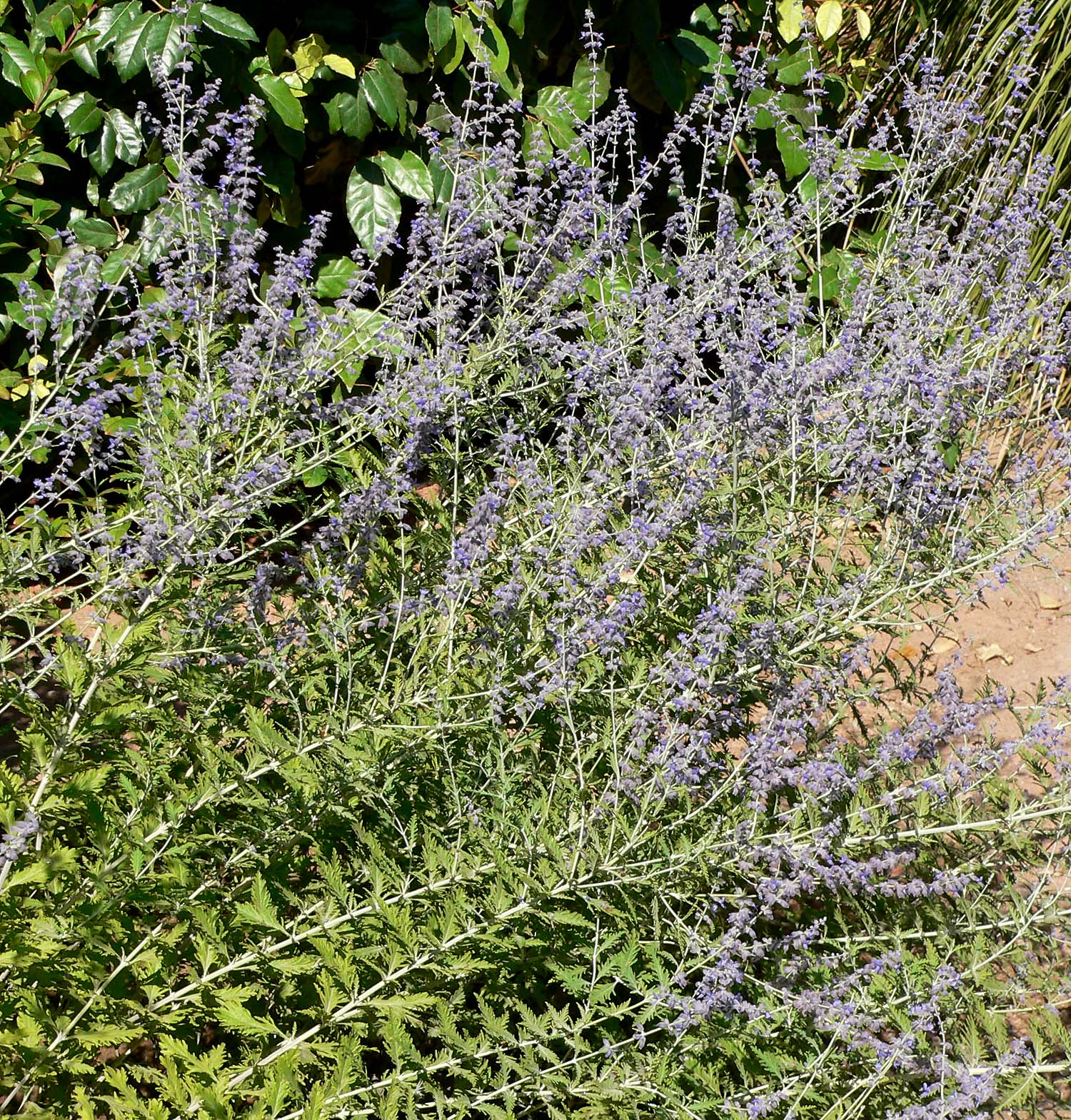
- Salvia × floriferior 'Blue Spire'

Scientific classification
- Kingdom: Plantae
- Clade: Tracheophytes
- Clade: Angiosperms
- Clade: Eudicots
- Clade: Asterids
- Order: Lamiales
- Family: Lamiaceae
- Tribe: Mentheae
- Genus: Salvia
- Subgenus: Salvia subg. Perovskia (Kar.) J.B.Walker, B.T.Drew & J.G.González

= Salvia subg. Perovskia =

Subgenus of plants in the mint family

Salvia subgenus Perovskia is a group of species within the flowering plant genus Salvia, which prior 2017 were treated as the separate genus Perovskia. Members of the group are native to southwestern and central Asia. It includes the garden plant Russian sage (Salvia × floriferior).

The subgenus and former genus are named after the Russian general V. A. Perovski (1794-1857).

Species

1. Salvia abrotanoides (Kar.) Systma – Tibet, Kyrgyzstan, Turkmenistan, Afghanistan, Iran, Pakistan, western Himalayas of northern India
2. Salvia bungei J.G.González, formerly Perovskia virgata Kudrjasch. – Tajikistan
3. Salvia karelinii J.B.Walker, formerly Perovskia angustifolia Kudrjasch. – Kyrgyzstan, Tajikistan
4. Salvia klokovii J.B.Walker, formerly Perovskia linczevskii Kudrjasch. – Tajikistan
5. Salvia kudrjaschevii (Gorschk. & Pjataeva) Systma – Kyrgyzstan, Kazakhstan
6. Salvia pobedimovae J.G.González, formerly Perovskia botschantzevii Kovalevsk & Kochk. – Kyrgyzstan, Tajikistan, Afghanistan
7. Salvia scrophulariifolia (Bunge) B.T.Drew – Kyrgyzstan, Tajikistan
8. Salvia yangii B.T.Drew – Afghanistan, Pakistan, western Himalayas, Tibet, Xinjiang

Hybrids

1. Salvia × floriferior Dolat. & Ziel. – so-called "Russian sage", also referred to as Perovskia × hybrida (unplaced taxon) and its synonym Perovskia × superba in Europe and Russia: (S. abrotanoides × S. yangii)
2. Perovskia × intermedia Lazkov – Kyrgyzstan: (S. abrotanoides × S. karelinii)

== Cultivation ==
Plants in cultivation are almost all hybrids, including Salvia 'Blue Spire', which is very likely Salvia × floriferior, a naturally occurring hybrid between the entire-leaved Salvia yangii and Salvia abrotanoides. The leaves of this breed have long narrow teeth (i.e. are laciniate), unlike S. yangii which has entire leaves with shallow teeth.

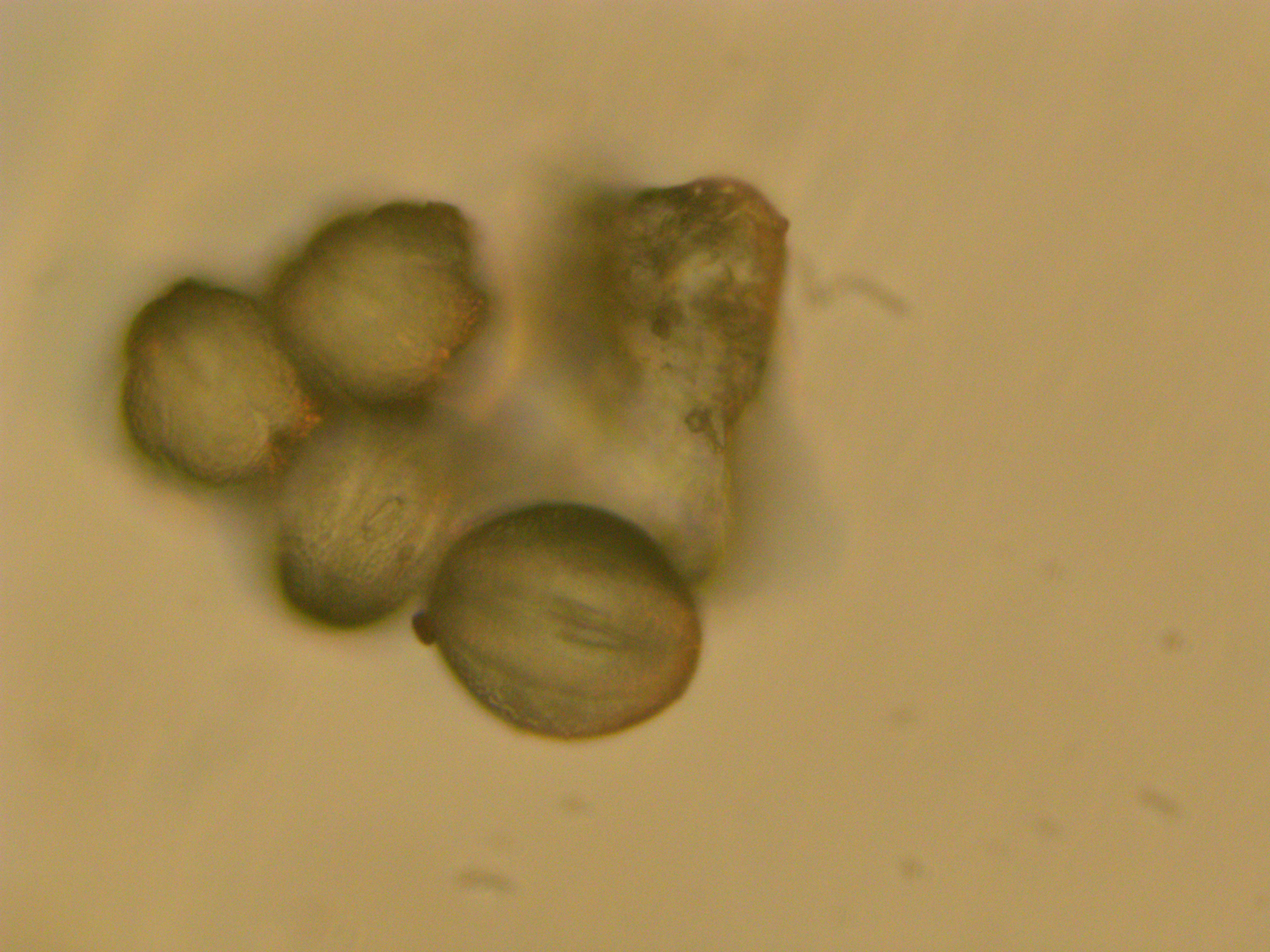
Pollen. Zoom 60x
