= Popular Liberation Front =

Popular Liberation Front may refer to:

- The Popular Liberation Front (Guatemala), a center-left political party that was a part of the Guatemalan Revolution (1944-1954)
- The Popular Liberation Front (Spain), a clandestine anti-Francoist group in Spain (1958-1969)
- The Polisario Front, a Sahrawi rebel national liberation group in the Western Sahara.
- The Popular Front for the Liberation of Chad, an insurgent group that operated along the Chad-Sudan border.
- The Popular Liberation Front of Azawad, a militant group active during the Tuareg Rebellion in Mali from 1990 to 1995.
