= FPH =

FPH may refer to:

- Eppegem railway station, in Belgium
- Faculty of Public Health, a British charity
- Free Press Houston, a free newspaper in Houston, Texas, United States
- First Philippine Holdings Corporation, a Philippine management and investment company
- Fisher & Paykel Healthcare, a New Zealand medical device manufacturer
- Honduran Patriotic Front (Spanish: Frente Patriotico Hondureño), a defunct Honduran political coalition
- Humanist Popular Front (Spanish: Frontera Popular Humanista), a Venezuelan political party
