= Democratic Front (Italy) =

Democratic Front Fronte Democratico
- Leader: Michele Emiliano
- Founded: April 2017
- Dissolved: 2018
- Ideology: Populism; Regionalism
- Political position: Big tent

The Democratic Front (Italian: Fronte Democratico, FD), is a heterogenous and mainly regional faction within the Democratic Party (PD), a political party in Italy. The faction was launched by Michele Emiliano, President of Apulia, one of the 20 regions of Italy, and former Mayor of Bari, in the run-up of the 2017 leadership election.

The FD includes centrists, Christian leftists, social democrats, democratic socialists, and left-wing populists.

In the election Emiliano obtained 10.9% of the vote and lost to Matteo Renzi (69.2%) and Andrea Orlando (20.0%). However, Emiliano did well in Southern Italy, obtaining 54.4% in Apulia, 24.4% in Basilicata and 22.6% in Molise.
