= Democratic Front for the Liberation of Togo =

Opposition group in Togo

The Democratic Front for the Liberation of Togo (French: Front Démocratique pour la Libération du Togo, FDLT) was a clandestine opposition group in Togo. FDLT published Ablodé.
