= Mohamed Lemine Ch'bih Ould Cheikh Melainine =

Mauritanian politician

Mohamed Lemine Ch'bih Ould Cheikh Malainine

President of the Popular Front
- In office 1998–2011
- Preceded by: Party established
- Succeeded by: Mohamed Mahmoud Ould Tolb

Personal details
- Born: December 12, 1951 (age 74) Atar, Colony of Mauritania
- Party: Popular Front
- Education: Nancy-Université

Mohamed Lemine Ch'bih Ould Cheikh Malainine (born 12 December 1951, in Atar) is a Mauritanian politician. He has served as a former leader of the Qadiriyya Islamic brotherhood.

== Early life and education ==
Ould Cheikh Melainine was born in Atar, then part of the French Colony of Mauritania, on 12 December 1951. He received his primary and secondary education in Mauritania, before travelling to France for higher studies. He received his bachelors, master's, and doctoral degrees from the University of Nancy in the late 1960s and early 1970s.

During his youth Ould Cheikh Melainine seemingly had some Marxist inclinations.

== Career ==
=== Government work ===
Following the completion of his education Ould Cheikh Melainine went on to serve at Mauritania's Ministry of Mining from 1976 to 1981, working on plan's relating to the development on industry in Mauritania. In 1981 he became the Director of research at the Mauritanian National Development Fund. Between 1981 and 1982 he also served as an adviser to the fisheries related Société des Frigorifiques de Mauritanie (SOFRIMA) and went on to serve from 1983 to 1986 as a Presidential Consultant on fisheries policy.

=== Political career ===
In 1998 Ould Cheikh Melainine founded the Popular Front. The party centered around a commitment to the establishment of a civil state, access of all political parties to the media, the separation of the Mauritanian state and the Democratic and Social Republican Party (PRDS) of President Maaouya Ould Sid'Ahmed Taya, and the creation of a national unity government chaired by the opposition. The front was initially mainly distinguished by its policy of non-participation in elections under the Ould Taya Government.

==== Arrest, trial, and imprisonment ====
On 8 April 2001 Ould Cheikh Melainine, along with fellow FP members Mukhtar Ould Haibetna and Bouba Ould Hassan were arrested. The trio were held incommunicado for the next 30 days and were charged with conspiring to overthrow the Mauritanian Government, plotting acts of terrorism, plotting to kidnap businessmen, and of taking illegal political funds from Gaddafi's Libya. The Ould Taya Government often accused its opponents of collusion with Libya, which was then still under economic sanctions. At times, opposition to the arrests took the form of violent protests, which required massive police intervention. Many defense lawyers inside and outside Mauritania offered to help the trio, although possible Government intervention in the trial made this difficult, with the trial itself being moved on 10 May 2001 some 850 kilometers from Nouakchott to the remote town of Ayoun el Atrous. Ould Cheikh Melainine was given only limited access to his lawyers, and Moussa Maiga, a Malian lawyer who had travelled to Ayoun el Atrous to take part in the defense team, was forced to leave Mauritania. Offers of legal help also came from France, Mali, Morocco, and Senegal.

The trial of Mohamed Lemine Ch'bih Ould Cheikh Melainine took place from 12 to 14 June 2001. The Prosecution didn't offer any circumstantial evidence, with the focus being on confessions given by the three, as well as oral testimony from two Government informants, who were deemed "non-credible" by some independent experts. The defense also claimed that the confessions had been only given under alleged "duress", and that Mauritanian police had possibly "drugged" the defendants during their interrogation.

The three were found guilty by the tribunal on 14 June and were each sentenced to 5 years imprisonment. Immediately after their trial they were moved to a prison near Ayoun el Atrous. Following their sentencing, it was expected by most observers that the three would receive a presidential pardon, or at the least that their sentences would be commuted. However, despite this expectation, and despite continuing domestic and international protests, no leniency was forthcoming.

There were fears over Ould Cheikh Melainine's fate after he fell seriously ill in February 2002 at the prison where he was being held. In response he was moved to a hospital in Ayoun et Atrous until he had fully recovered, at which point he was returned to prison.

==== Release ====
Following his near overthrow in the violent attempted coup on the 8/9 June 2003, President Maaouya Ould Sid'Ahmed Taya attempted to give the appearance of increasing tolerance for the political opposition. As a result, Ould Cheikh Melainine was released, along with his two co-detainees, on 23 August 2003. By this point Ould Cheikh Melainine had served approximately half of his sentence.

Following his release Ould Cheikh Melainine lived quietly in Nouakchott, although he became involved in politics again after President Ould Taya was overthrown in a coup d'état in August 2005.

He ran in the 2007 presidential election, although obtaining only a very small fraction of the popular vote; 2,111 votes, or 0.28%.
