= National Democratic Front =

National Democratic Front may refer to:

- National Democratic Front (Algeria)
- National Democratic Front (Bangladesh)
- National Democratic Front (Central African Republic)
- National Democratic Front (French India)
- National Democratic Front (Guyana)
- Indian National Democratic Front
- National Democratic Front (Iran)
- Libyan National Democratic Front
- National Democratic Front (Mexico)
- National Democratic Front (Myanmar)
- National Democratic Front (Pakistan)
- National Democratic Front (Peru)
- National Democratic Front (Philippines)
- National Democratic Front (Romania)
- National Democratic Front (Yemen)
- National United Front of Democracy Against Dictatorship, sometimes shortened to the National Democratic Front (Thailand)
- Anti-Imperialist National Democratic Front (South Korea)

India

Various militant groups in India:

- National Democratic Front of Boroland
  - National Democratic Front of Boroland - Progressive
  - National Democratic Front of Boroland (D.R. Nabla faction)

== See also ==
- Democratic Front (disambiguation)
- National Front (disambiguation)
