= Forest Park High School =

Forest Park High School may refer to several schools in the United States:

- Forest Park High School (Georgia), in Forest Park
- Forest Park High School (Indiana), in Ferdinand
- Forest Park High School (Maryland), in Baltimore
- Forest Park High School (Michigan), in Crystal Falls
- Forest Park High School (Beaumont, Texas)
- Forest Park High School (Woodbridge, Virginia)
