= National Front =

National Front or Front National can refer to the following political parties and coalitions:

== Africa ==
- Botswana National Front
- National Front for the Salvation of Libya
- Namibia National Front
- Front National (South Africa), a Boer-Afrikaner political party in South Africa
- National Front (Sudan)
- National Front Party (Egypt)
- South African National Front, neo-fascist organisation associated with the British National Front
- Swaziland National Front, a political party in Eswatini

== Asia ==
- Chin National Front, a political and military organization in Burma
- Mizo National Front, India
- National Front (India)
- National Front (Iran) (Jebhe-ye Melli Iran)
- Barisan Nasional (National Front) in Malaysia
- Balawaristan National Front, Pakistan
- United National Front (Sri Lanka)
- National Front - South Yemen's ruling party from 1967-1978

== Europe ==
- National Front (Albania)
- Partyja BPF, Belarus
- National Front (Belgium)
- Bulgarian National Front
- National Front (Czechoslovakia)
- National Front (East Germany)
- Rahvarinne, Estonia
- Finnish People's Blue-whites, known as National Front 1997–2001
- National Front (French Resistance), a World War II French Resistance group
- Front National des Musiciens, an organization of musicians in Nazi-occupied France
- Nationalist Front (Germany), a German neo-Nazi group that is sometimes translated as National Front
- National Front (Greece)
- National Front (Hungary)
- Icelandic National Front
- National Front (Italy, 1967)
- National Front (Italy, 1990)
- National Front (Italy, 1997)
- Black Front (Netherlands) (1934–41), known as National Front 1940–41
- National Front (Spain, 1986)
- National Front (Spain, 2006)
- National Front (Switzerland)
- National Front (UK), a far-right fascist British political party founded in 1967, which peaked during the 1970s–1980s and declined in the 1990s
- Front National, a far-right political party in France known since 2018 as National Rally

== Other places ==
- National Front (Australia) (1977-1984)
- National Front (Colombia) (1958–1974), an agreement between the Liberal and Conservative parties
- New Zealand National Front (1968-2019)

== See also ==
- National Front Party (disambiguation)
- National Resistance Front (disambiguation)
- Popular Front (disambiguation)
- United Front (disambiguation)
- National Democratic Front (disambiguation)
