= Left Unity (Jawaharlal Nehru University) =

Group of students' organisations

Left Unity is a group of left wing students' organisations in Jawaharlal Nehru University. It was formed with aim to counter the growing influence of right wing students organization like ABVP, a students front of Rashtriya Swayamsevak Sangh. Left Unity predominantly consists of four major students organisations - AISF, AISA, SFI, and DSF. The panel of Left Unity has won the election of Jawaharlal Nehru University Students' Union for four consecutive years.
