= Democratic Front (Georgia) =

Faction in the Parliament of Georgia

Democratic Front was an opposition faction in Parliament of Georgia. Democratic Front is coalition of the Republican Party of Georgia, the Conservative Party of Georgia and some non-party MPs. Democratic Front is chaired by David Zurabishvili, former member of Liberty Institute.
