= Banana peel =

Peel of the fruit of a banana (genus Musa)

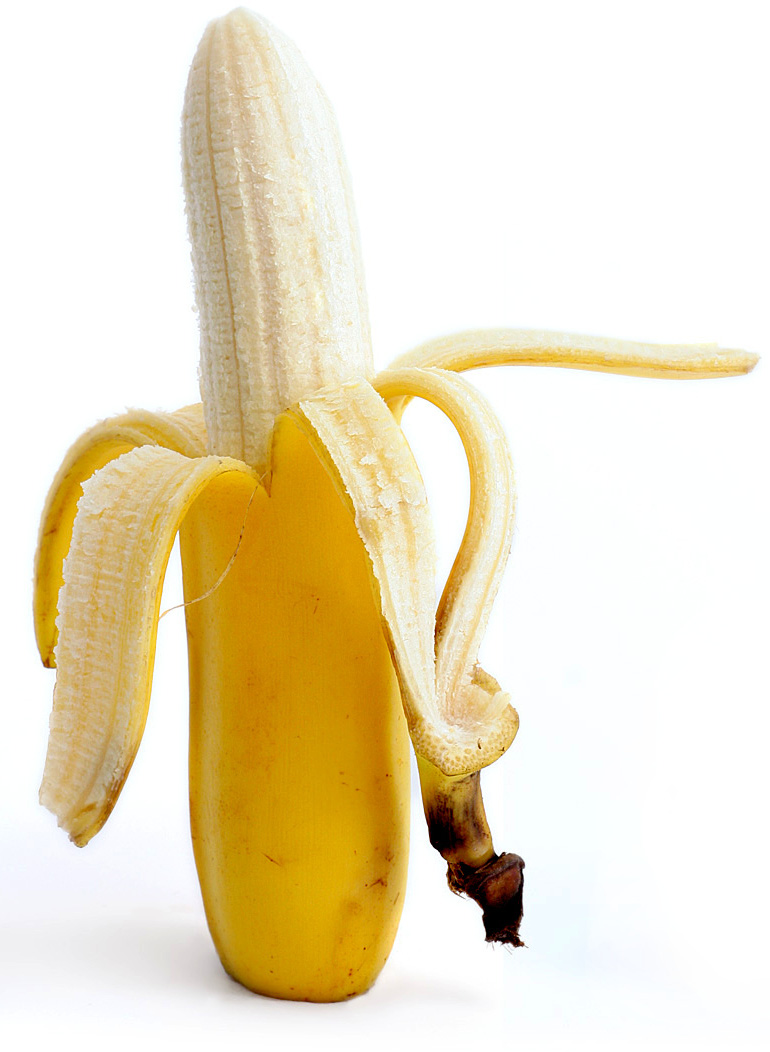
A banana with peel partly removed (partially "peeled"). The peel is the yellow outer "skin".

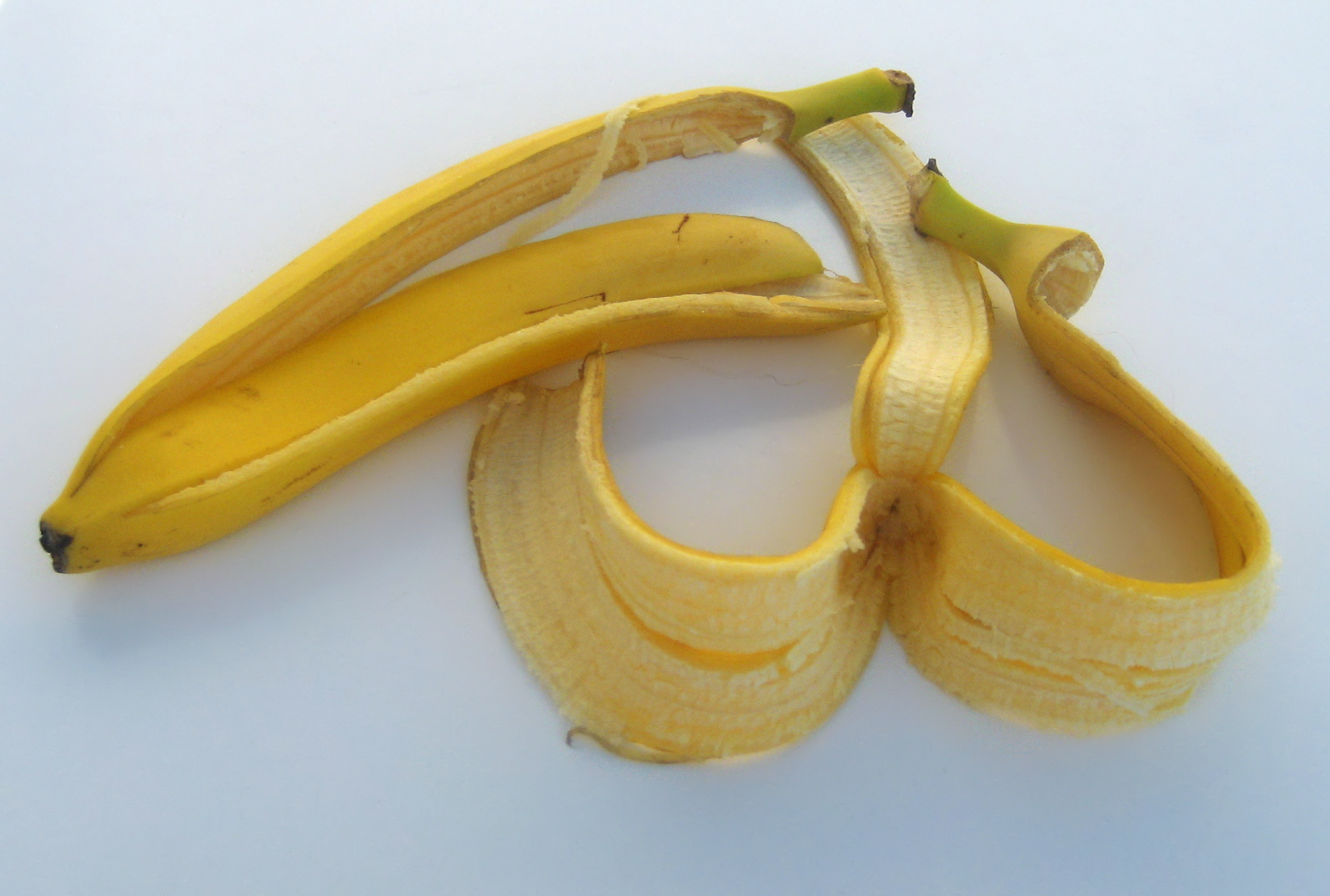
Discarded banana peels

A banana peel, called banana skin in British English, is the outer covering of a banana. Banana peels are used as food for animals, an ingredient in cooking, in water purification, for manufacturing of several biochemical products as well as for jokes and comical situations.

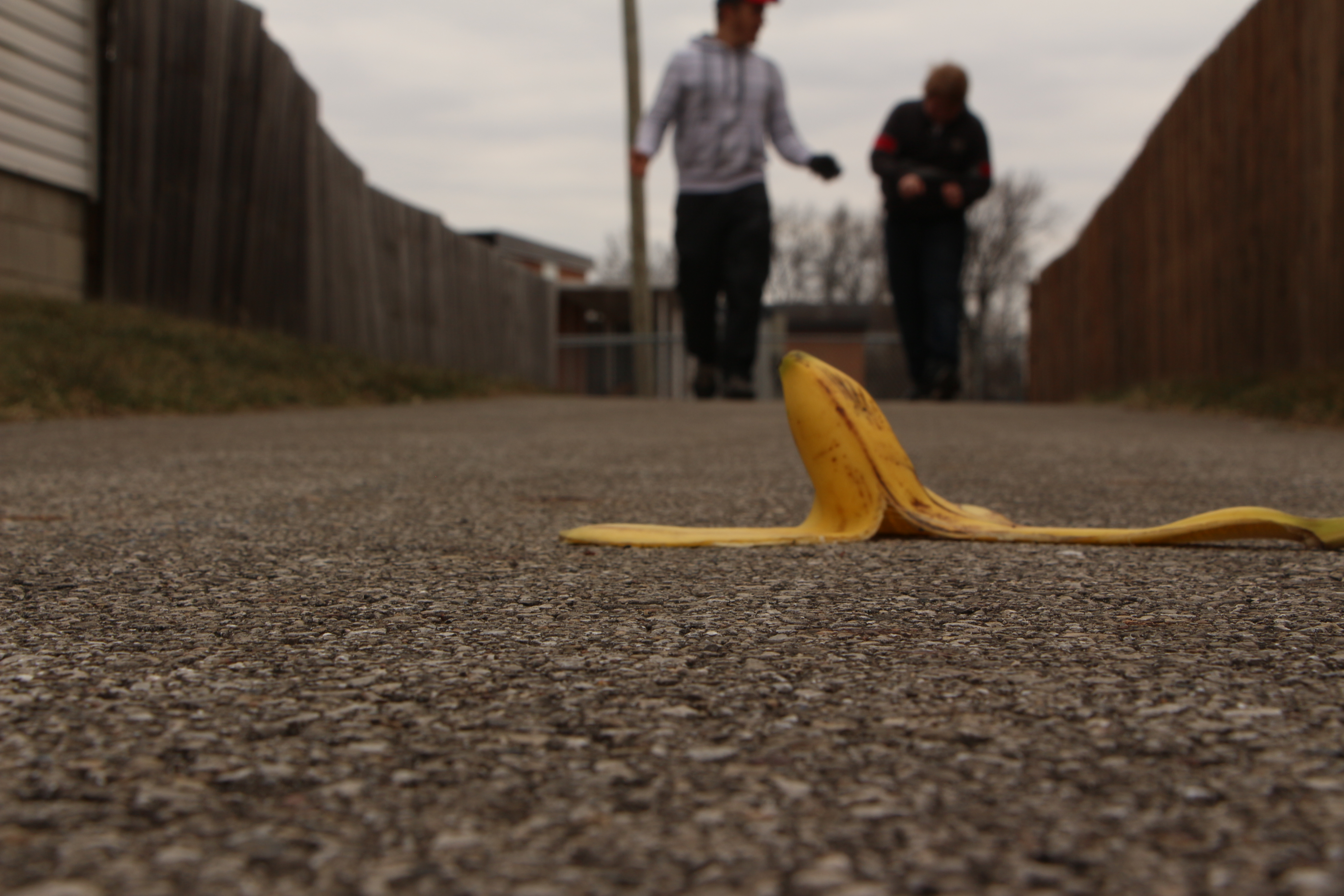
A banana peel on the ground.

There are several methods to remove a peel from a banana.

== Use ==
Bananas are a popular fruit consumed worldwide with a yearly production of over 165 million tonnes in 2011. Once the peel is removed, the fruit can be eaten raw or cooked and the peel is generally discarded. Because of this removal of the banana peel, a significant amount of organic waste is generated.

Banana peels are sometimes used as feedstock for cattle, goats, pigs, monkeys, poultry, rabbits, fish, zebras and several other species, typically on small farms in regions where bananas are grown. There are some concerns over the impact of tannins contained in the peels on animals that consume them.

The nutritional value of banana peel depends on the stage of maturity and the cultivar; For example plantain peels contain less fibre than dessert banana peels, and lignin content increases with ripening (from 7 to 15% dry matter). On average, banana peels contain 6-9% dry matter of protein and 20-30% fibre (measured as NDF). Green plantain peels contain 40% starch that is transformed into sugars after ripening. Green banana peels contain much less starch (about 15%) when green than plantain peels, while ripe banana peels contain up to 30% free sugars.

Banana peels are also used for water purification, to produce ethanol, cellulase, laccase, as fertilizer and in composting.

== Culinary use ==
Cooking with banana peel is common in Southeast Asian, Indian and Venezuelan cuisine where the peel of bananas and plantains is used in recipes. In April 2019, a vegan pulled pork recipe using banana peel by food blogger Melissa Copeland aka The Stingy Vegan went viral. In 2020, The Great British Bake Off winner Nadiya Hussain revealed she uses banana peels as an alternative to pulled pork when making burgers in an effort to reduce food waste. Later that year television chef Nigella Lawson used banana skin as an ingredient for a curry on her BBC show.

== In comical context ==
Banana peel is also part of the classic physical comedy slapstick visual gag, the "slipping on a banana peel". This gag was already seen as classic in 1920s America. It can be traced to the late 19th century, when banana peel waste was considered a public hazard in a number of American towns. Although banana peel-slipping jokes date to at least 1854, they became much more popular, beginning in the late-1860s, when the large-scale importation of bananas made them more readily available. Vaudeville comedian Cal Stewart included banana peel jokes in one of the earliest comedy albums, Uncle Josh in a Department Store in 1903. Before banana peels were readily available, orange peels and other fruit skins were recognized as slippery and used in jokes, but not to the extent of banana peels. Slipping on a banana peel was at one point a real concern with municipal ordinances governing the disposal of the peel.

The coefficient of friction of banana peel on a linoleum surface was measured at just 0.07, about half that of lubricated metal on metal. Researchers attribute this to the crushing of the natural polysaccharide follicular gel, releasing a homogeneous sol. This finding was awarded the 2014 Ig Nobel Prize for physics.

MythBusters would later test the gag to see if it is as effective as portrayed in media. The myth was deemed "busted", as the test subjects slipped only when running rather than merely walking.

== Peeling methods ==
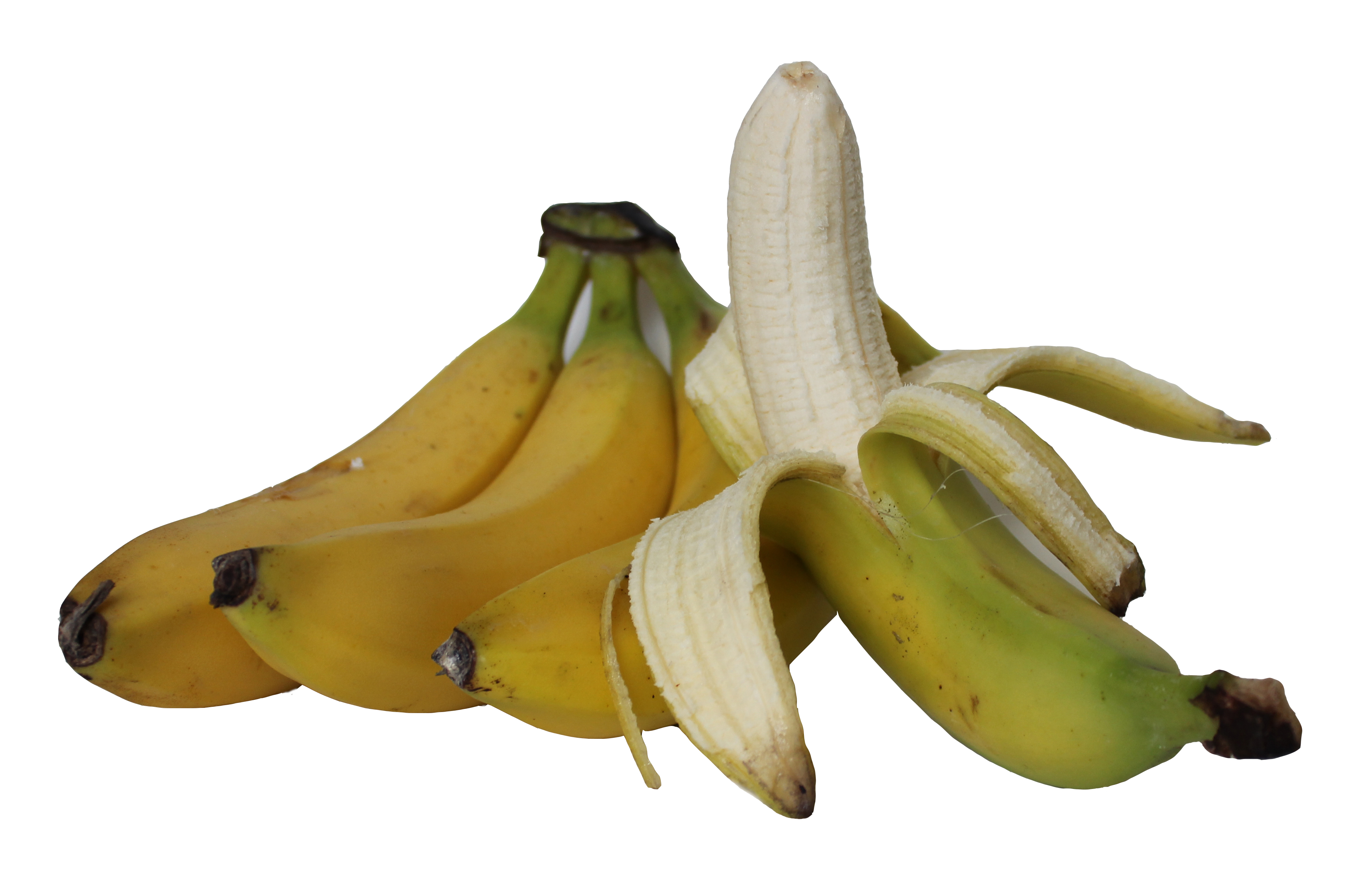
A banana peeled the "monkey way"

Most people peel a banana by cutting or snapping the stem and divide the peel into sections while pulling them away from the bared fruit. Another way of peeling a banana is done in the opposite direction, from the end with the brownish floral residue—a way usually perceived as "upside down".

When the tip of a banana is pinched with two fingers, it will split and the peel comes off in two clean sections. The inner fibres, or "strings", between the fruit and the peel will remain attached to the peel and the stem of the banana can be used as a handle when eating the banana.

== Psychoactive effects of banana peels ==
There has been a widespread belief that banana peels contain a psychoactive substance, and that smoking them may produce a "high", or a sense of relaxation. This belief, which may be a rumor or urban legend, is often associated with the 1966 song "Mellow Yellow" by Donovan. A recipe for the extraction of the fictional chemical bananadine is found in The Anarchist Cookbook of 1971.
