= Humanist Popular Front =

Political party in Venezuela

Humanist Popular Front Frontera Popular Humanista
- Abbreviation: FPH
- Founded: 14 January 2009

The Humanist Popular Front (in Spanish: Frontera Popular Humanista, FPH) is a center-left Venezuelan political party formed by dissidents of the For Social Democracy and the Fatherland For All parties on 14 January 2009. There were five members represented in the National Assembly of Venezuela until the 2010 Venezuelan parliamentary election.
