= Popular Front for the Liberation of Chad =

Small militant rebel insurgent group

The Popular Front for the Liberation of Chad (Front Populaire pour la Libération du Tchad or FPLT) was a small insurgent group active during the First Chadian Civil War. Founded in 1968 by Awad Mukhtar Nasser, it was based in Sudan and operated along the Chad-Sudan border. After the fall of François Tombalbaye's regime in 1975, it gave up armed struggle as its leadership reconciled with Félix Malloum's new government.

In 1979 the FPLT reemerged, always under the leadership of Nasser. With few or no roots in Chad, the group was formed mainly to participate to the peace gep that were being held in Nigeria, where it was meant to represent Sudanese interests. But this plan failed since the FPLT played no part neither in the Kano Accord, nor in the Lagos Accord. All the same the FPLT remained Sudan's main agent in the country till 1982 when Sudan gave all its support to Hissène Habré's government, with the consequent decline of the FPLT.
