= Popular Front (disambiguation) =

A popular front is a term for a political coalition which is commonly made up of parties ranging ideologically from liberalism to communism, historically for the purpose of opposing the rise of fascism or far-right politics in general. In Post-Soviet states, the word has a different meaning, instead connoting a liberal intellectual organization formed to support self-determination for the territory in which it operated.

Popular Front may refer to:

== Political movements ==
- Alliance of the Christian Democratic Popular Front
- Azerbaijani Popular Front Party
- Belarusian Popular Front
- Broad Popular Front, a small Panamanian left-of-center political party, 1977-1984.
- Comorian Popular Front
- Humanist Popular Front, a center-left Venezuelan political party formed in 2009.
- Ivorian Popular Front
- Mauritanian Popular Front
- Popular Democratic Front (Italy)
- Popular Front (Burkina Faso)
- Popular Front (Chile)
- Popular Front (France)
- Popular Front (Philippines)
- Popular Front (Senegal)
- Popular Front (Spain)
- Popular Front (Tunisia)
- Popular Front (UK)
- Popular Front for Armed Resistance
- Popular Front for Change and Liberation
- Popular Front for Democracy, the main opposition political party in Ghana during the Third Republic (1979-1981).
- Popular Front for Recovery, a militia from Chad.
- Popular Front for the Liberation of Bahrain
- Popular Front for the Liberation of Chad
- Popular Front for the Liberation of Libya
- Popular Front for the Liberation of Oman
- Popular Front for the Liberation of Palestine
- Popular Front for the Liberation of Palestine – External Operations
- Popular Front for the Liberation of Palestine – General Command
- Popular Front for the Liberation of Palestine – Special Command
- Popular Front for the Liberation of the Occupied Arabian Gulf
- Popular Front of Estonia
- Popular Front of India
- Popular Front of Latvia
- Popular Front of Moldova
- Popular Front of Potosí
- Popular Front of the Canary Islands
- Popular Front Party
- Popular Revolutionary Front for the Liberation of Palestine
- Unified Popular Front, a political party in Iraq.
- United Popular Front, a Greek political party founded in July 2011.
- United Popular Front (Iraq)
- Worker Peasant Student and Popular Front

== Media ==
- Popular Front, an independent media outlet and podcast founded by British journalist Jake Hanrahan

== See also ==
- Popular Democratic Front (disambiguation)
- Popular Liberation Front (disambiguation)
- People's Front (disambiguation)
