= Popular Front (Mauritania) =

Popular Front Front Populaire الجبهة الشعبية
- President: Mohamed Mahmoud Ould Tolb
- Founder: Mohamed Lemine Ch'bih Ould Cheikh Melainine
- Founded: 1998
- National affiliation: Patriotic Alliance
- Seats in the National Assembly: 0 / 176

The Popular Front (French: Front Populaire) is a small political party in Mauritania.

The party was founded in 1998 based on a platform committed to the establishment of a civil state, access of all political parties to the media, the separation of the Mauritanian State and the Democratic and Social Republican Party (PRDS) of President Maaouya Ould Sid'Ahmed Taya, and the creation of a national unity government chaired by the opposition. The front was initially mainly distinguished by its policy of non-participation in elections under the Ould Taya Government.

Party leader Mohamed Lemine Ch'bih Ould Cheikh Melainine was arrested on 8 April 2001 along with two other party members, Mukhtar Ould Haibetna and Bouba Ould Hassan, on grounds of conspiracy to commit acts of sabotage and terrorism in Mauritania.

The Mauritanian Government alleged the trio to have been acting in collusion with the Libyan Government of Muammar al-Gaddafi. The three were tried in a criminal court some 850 kilometers from Nouakchott, and each of the accused received a sentence of five-years imprisonment. The sentence was met with surprise from many observers, who had expected the three to be acquitted. The defense team argued that the trial was deeply flawed, and that the confessions from their clients had been obtained as a result of an interrogation during which they had been possibly "drugged" by the Mauritanian police.

The party went on to contest the legislative elections in October 2001, winning one seat in the National Assembly.

Following the removal of Maaouya Ould Sid'Ahmed Taya from Office in August 2005, the party competed in the 2006 elections, winning 1 out of 95 seats.

As of 2023, the Popular Front has no representation in the Mauritanian Parliament, the party currently has zero seats.
