= United Front (disambiguation) =

A united front is an alliance of groups against their common enemies.

The United Front may also refer to:

== Politics ==
- United Front (Afghanistan), the Northern Alliance, officially the United Islamic National Front for the Salvation of Afghanistan
- the United Front adopted by the Comintern in 1922
- Anguilla United Front
- United Front (East Pakistan)
- United Front of Mozambique
- United Front (Sri Lanka)

=== India ===
- United Front (India, 1996)
- United Front (West Bengal), a political coalition in West Bengal
- United Front (1967–1969, Kerala), a political coalition in Kerala
- United Front (1970–1979, Kerala), a political coalition in Kerala

=== China ===
- United front (China), a political strategy of the Chinese Communist Party involving networks of groups and individuals
  - United Front Work Department, a Chinese Communist Party department for relations with non-communist entities
  - United front in Hong Kong, a strategy used by China to attain greater control over Hong Kong
  - United front in Taiwan, a strategy used by China to achieve dominance over Taiwan
- First United Front (1924–27), an alliance between the nationalists and communists of China to end the Warlord Era
  - Second United Front (1937–41), an alliance between the nationalists and communists of China against Japanese forces during the Second Sino-Japanese War

=== Colombia ===
- United Front, a political coalition founded by Camilo Torres Restrepo in 1965.

== Other uses ==
- "Einheitsfrontlied" (German for "United Front Song"), an anti-fascist song written to unite social democrats and communists against the Nazi party
- United Front: Brass Ecstasy at Newport, a 2011 album by Dave Douglas
- "United Front", a song by Arrested Development from Zingalamaduni

== See also ==
- United Democratic Front (disambiguation)
- Popular Front (disambiguation), any coalition of working-class and middle-class parties
- National Front (disambiguation)
- United Front Games, a former Canadian video game development studio
