= Neutral detergent fiber =

Neutral detergent fiber (NDF) is the most common measure of fiber used for animal feed analysis, but it does not represent a unique class of chemical compounds. NDF measures most of the structural components in plant cells (i.e. lignin, hemicellulose and cellulose), but not pectin. Further analysis can be done to the sample to determine individual components such as acid detergent fiber (ADF) analysis.

The process of determining NDF content involves a neutral detergent that dissolves plant pectins, proteins, sugars and lipids. This leaves behind the fibrous parts such as cellulose, lignin and hemicellulose.

Recent nutritional requirement tables for ruminants report limits for NDF intake.

The level of NDF in the animal ration influences the animal's intake of dry matter and the time of rumination. The concentration of NDF in feeds is negatively correlated with energy concentration.
