= Swedish Mathematical Society =

Mathematical society in Sweden

- Svenska Matematikersamfundet
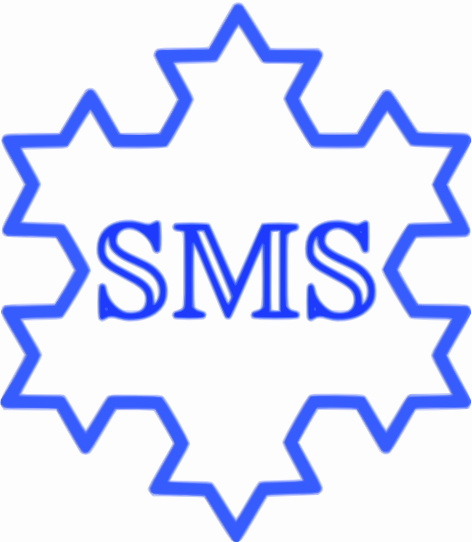
- Abbreviation: SMS
- Formation: 1950; 76 years ago
- Type: Mathematical society
- Location: Sweden
- President: Volodymyr Mazorchuk
- Award: Wallenberg Prize
- Website: www.swe-math-soc.se

The Swedish Mathematical Society (Swedish: Svenska Matematikersamfundet, SMS) is a mathematical society founded in Sweden in 1950. It is a member of the European Mathematical Society and is recognised by the International Mathematics Union.

The Swedish Mathematical Society organises two member meetings per year, awards the Wallenberg Prize annually, and organises conferences and scientific meetings with other mathematical societies. It publishes a bulletin three times a year. The logo of the SMS contains the third iteration of the Koch snowflake, which was first described by Swedish mathematician Helge von Koch in 1904.

== Presidents ==
The first president of the Swedish Mathematical Society was Arne Beurling, and the second president was Åke Pleijel. The Swedish Mathematical Society elects a new president every two years, and traditionally each president works at a different mathematics department from their predecessor. The current president of the SMS is Volodymyr Mazorchuk.

== Wallenberg Prize ==
Since 1983 the Swedish Mathematical Society has awarded its Wallenberg Prize to Swedish mathematicians under 40 that have a Ph.D. It is Sweden's most prestigious award for young mathematicians. The winner is the main speaker at the autumn meeting of the society.

Past winners of the prize are:

- 1983 – Torsten Ekedahl
- 1984 – Svante Janson and Anders Melin
- 1987 – Johan Håstad
- 1988 – Mikael Passare and Ulf Persson
- 1989 – Arne Meurman
- 1990 – Håkan Eliasson
- 1991 – Per Salberger
- 1992 – Håkan Hedenmalm
- 1993 – Johan Råde
- 1994 – Mats Andersson
- 1995 – Kurt Johansson and Anders Szepessy
- 1996 – Peter Ebenfelt
- 1997 – Erik Andersén and Bernt Wennberg
- 1998 – Lars Ernström and Timo Weidl
- 1999 – Olle Häggström
- 2000 – Tobias Ekholm and Erik Palmgren
- 2001 – Warwick Tucker
- 2002 – Pär Kurlberg and Genkai Zhang
- 2003 – Dmitrij Kozlov and Oleg Safronov
- 2004 – Julius Borcea and Serguei Shimorin
- 2005 – Hans Rullgård and Andreas Strömbergsson
- 2006 – Mattias Jonsson
- 2007 – Hans Ringström
- 2008 – Petter Brändén and Anders Karlsson
- 2009 – Mats Boij and Kaj Nyström
- 2010 – Robert Berman
- 2011 – Johan Wästlund
- 2012 – Kristian Bjerklöv and Andreas Rosén
- 2013 – Håkan Samuelsson Kalm and Elizabeth Wulcan
- 2014 – Fredrik Wiklund
- 2015 – Jonatan Lenells and David Rydh
- 2016 – John Andersson and Erik Wahlén
- 2017 – Maurice Duits
- 2018 – Dan Petersen and David Witt Nyström
- 2019 – Mikael Björklund and Erik Lindgren
- 2020 – Thomas Kragh
- 2021 – Magnus Goffeng
- 2022 – Wushi Goldring and Martin Raum
- 2023 – Lilian Matthiesen and Olof Sisask
- 2024 – Malin Palö Forsström and Cecilia Holmgren
- 2025 – Kathlén Kohn and Gaultier Lambert

== See also ==
- List of mathematical societies
