= Tage Erlander Prize =

Swedish prize for science research

The Tage Erlander Prize (Tage Erlanders pris) is a prize awarded by the Royal Swedish Academy of Science "for research in Natural Sciences and Technology" in four fields (Physics, Chemistry, Technology and Biology). The prize is awarded on a rolling schedule: every year the prize is awarded for research in one of these fields.

The prize commemorates Tage Erlander, who was the prime minister of Sweden from 1946 to 1969.

Its 2024 recipient is mathematician Lilian Matthiesen.
