= Karlstad =

City in Värmland, Sweden

- Episcopal see and municipal seat
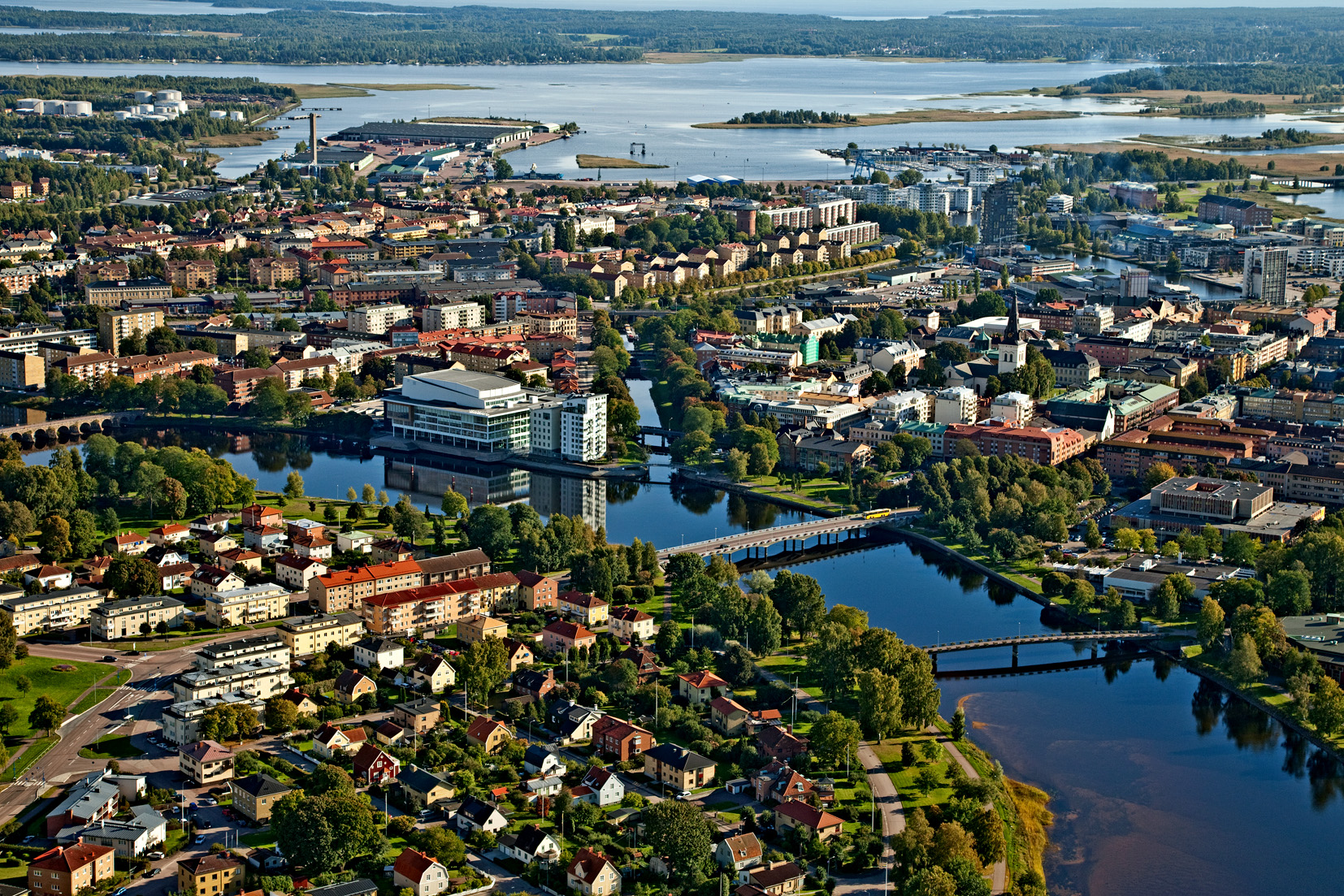
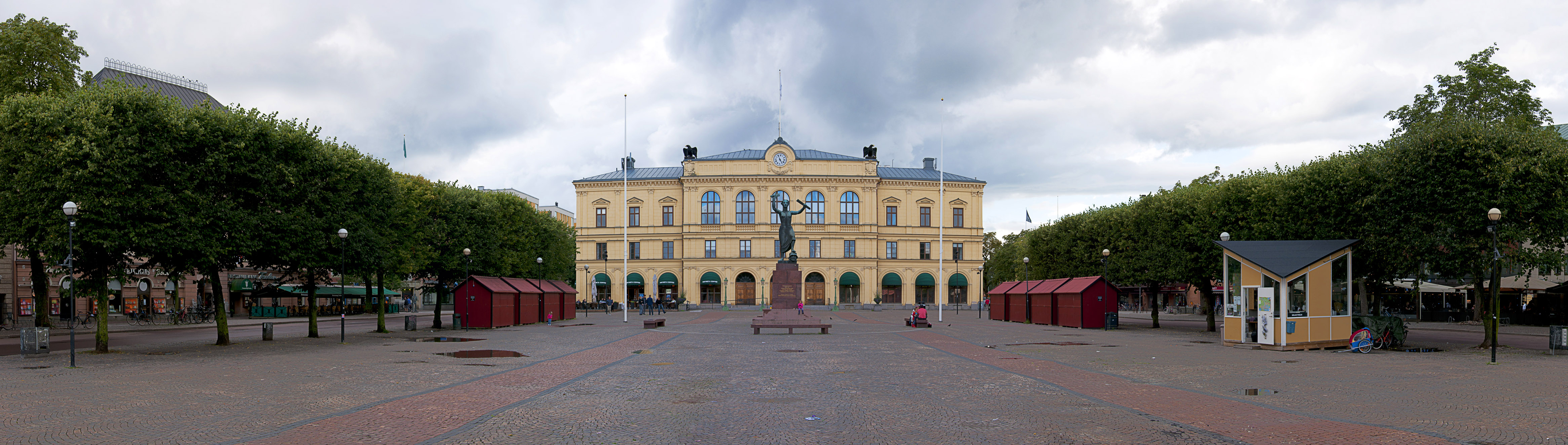

- Coat of arms
- Nicknames: City of the Sun, Sun city
- Location within Värmland County Location within Sweden
- Coordinates: 59°22′42″N 13°30′15″E
- Country: Sweden
- Province: Värmland
- County: Värmland County
- Municipality: Karlstad Municipality
- Founder: King Charles IX

Government
  - Chairman of the Executive Board: Linda Larsson

Area
  - Episcopal see and municipal seat: 30.31 km^{2} (11.70 sq mi)
- Elevation: 64 m (210 ft)

Population (2020 (city); 2015 (metro))
  - Episcopal see and municipal seat: 67,122
  - Density: 2,035/km^{2} (5,270/sq mi)
  - Metro: 96,466
- Time zone: UTC+1 (CET)
  - Summer (DST): UTC+2 (CEST)
- Postal code: 65x xx
- Area code: (+46) 54
- Website: www.karlstad.se

Karlstad (US: /ˈkɑːrlstɑːd/, Swedish: [ˈkɑ̌ːɭsta(d)]) is the 20th-largest city in Sweden, the seat of Karlstad Municipality, the capital of Värmland County, and the largest city in the province Värmland in Sweden. The city proper had 67,122 inhabitants in 2020 with 97,233 inhabitants in the wider municipality in 2023, and is the 21st largest municipality in Sweden. Karlstad has a university and a cathedral.

In recent years, Karlstad has started seeing big growth with many new buildings, for example the new apartment complexes around Orrholmen and Tullholmen, hosting a brand new Coop store and a 17 story high rise apartment which was finished in late 2022.

Karlstad is built on the river delta where Sweden's longest river, Klarälven, runs into Sweden's largest lake, Vänern. It has the second largest lake port in the country after Västerås.

Karlstad is reputed to be one of the sunniest towns in Sweden and a local waitress, known as "Sola i Karlstad" (the Sun in Karlstad) for her sunny disposition, is commemorated with a statue.

== History ==
On Karlstad's largest islet, there was a place of counsel called Tingvalla in the medieval age, which had roots from the Viking Age before 1000 AD. It was also used as a market place.

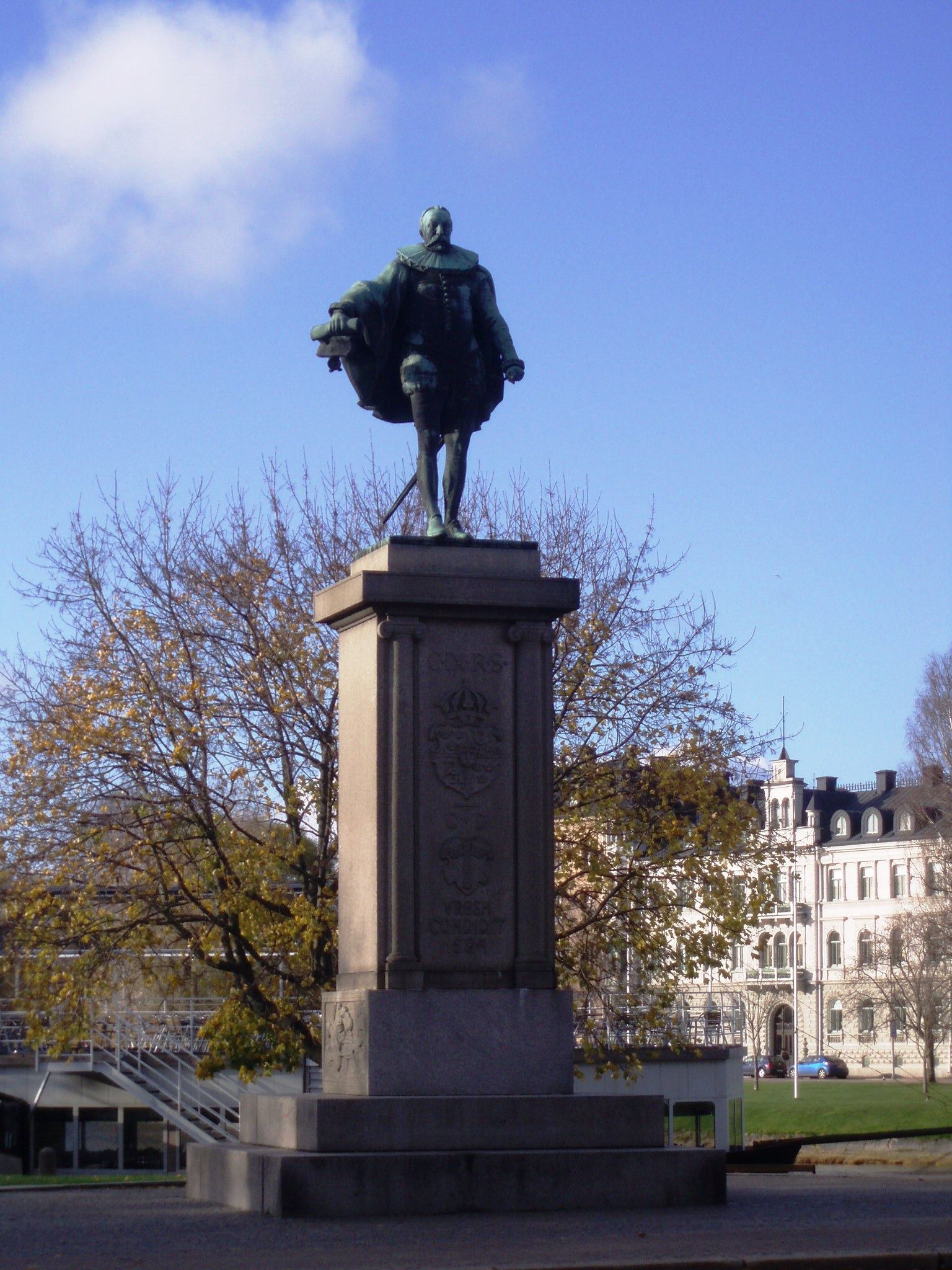
Statue of Charles IX of Sweden

Karlstad was granted its city charter on March 5, 1584, by the Swedish Duke Charles, who would later be crowned King Charles IX of Sweden. The city derives its name from the King – Karlstad literally means Charles' city. The Duke also granted Karlstad the right as a governmental seat in the region, and gave it a substantial amount of land.

The Duke built his own house in the city, which is referred to as Kungsgården (The King's Manor). Karlstad's Cathedral was built on the location Kungsgården in 1724–1730 by Christian Haller.

Then most significant coup d'état in modern Swedish history had its beginning in Karlstad. During the night of 7 March 1809, major general Georg Adlersparre used a part of the western army that was stationed in Värmland to occupy Karlstad. From there, they officially proclaimed a revolution, and during 9 March, he and his soldiers began their march toward the capital to end the reign of king Gustav IV Adolf.

Karlstad has suffered four major fires. Only the cathedral and a few houses remained after the last fire on July 2, 1865. Karlstad was thereafter rebuilt according to a grid pattern with wide streets surrounded by trees.

In 1905, the agreement to dissolve the union between Norway and Sweden was negotiated and signed in Karlstad.

== Demographics ==
=== Language ===
The official language, Swedish, is the native language of a large majority and also spoken by most people in Karlstad. Immigration has also established five notable minority languages:

- Arabic
- Somali
- Sorani
- Persian
- Serbo-Croatian; Bosnian, Croatian and Serbian (in practice treated as one language).

=== Religion ===
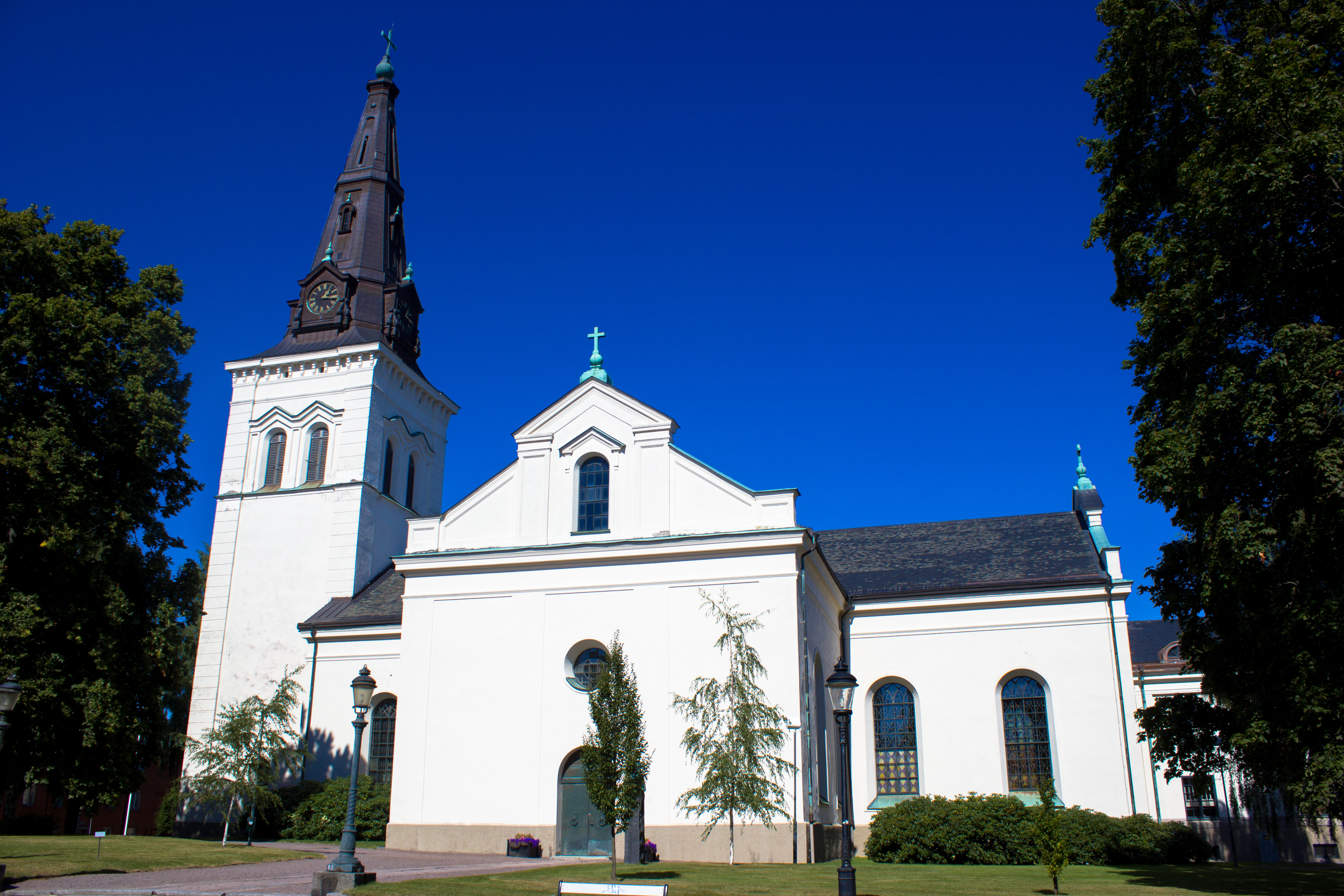
The Karlstad Cathedral

Karlstad has several Christian denominations, including the Church of Sweden, with notable churches such as the Karlstad Cathedral built in 1730. In the 1800s, a small Jewish community formed in Karlstad and built a synagogue in 1899, which was demolished in 1961.

=== Education ===
Several upper secondary schools (gymnasium) offer the most common range of courses usually available throughout Sweden, including the IB Diploma Programme. The majority of students in Värmland need to commute or move to Karlstad for their upper secondary education. Tertiary education is offered by Karlstad University, which was granted university status in 1999.

== Media ==
Värmlands Folkblad and Nya Wermlands-Tidningen are both located in Karlstad, with county-wide circulations.

== Sports and recreation ==
=== Winter sports ===
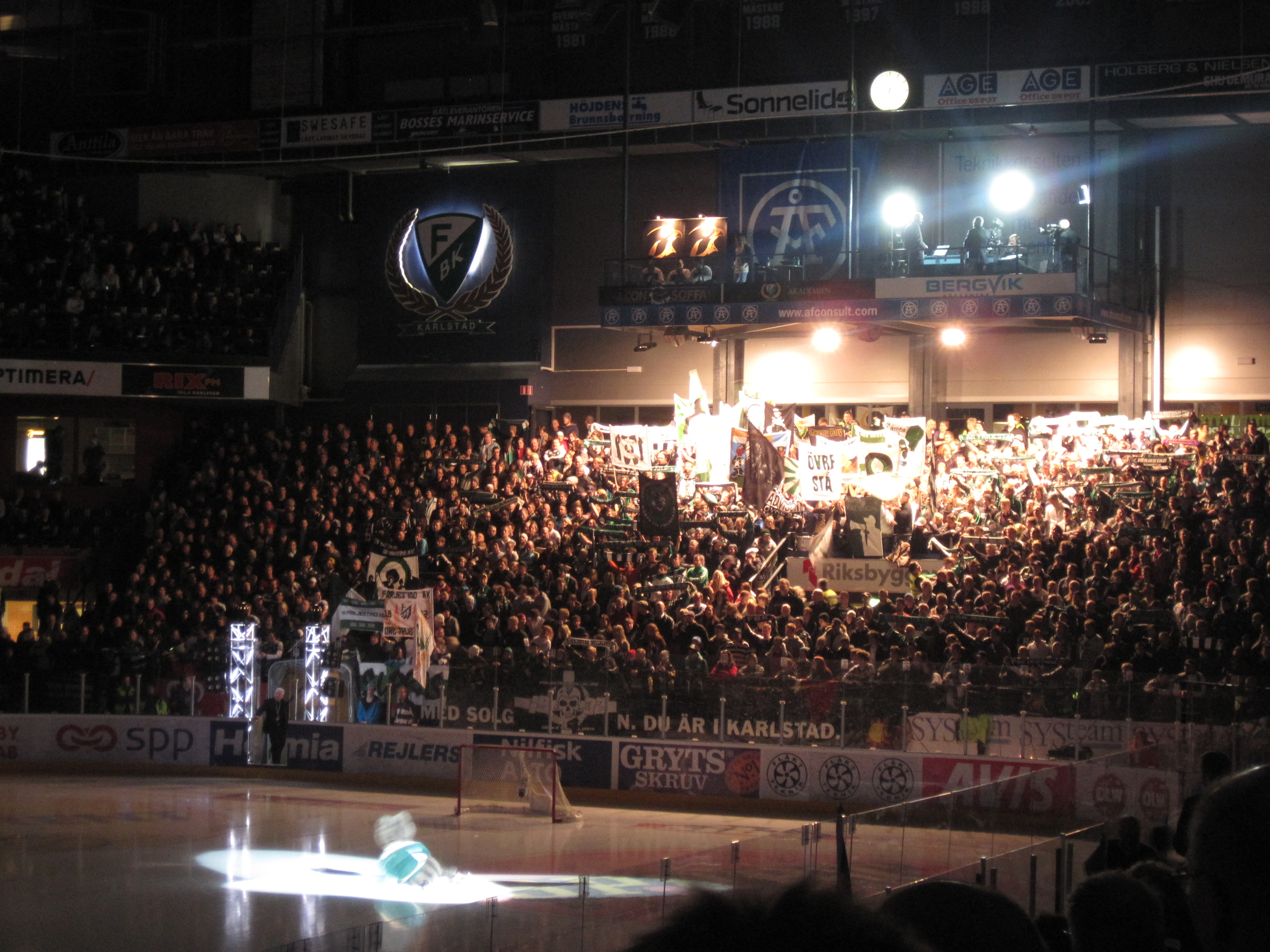
The Home Terrace in Löfbergs Lila Arena prior to match opening

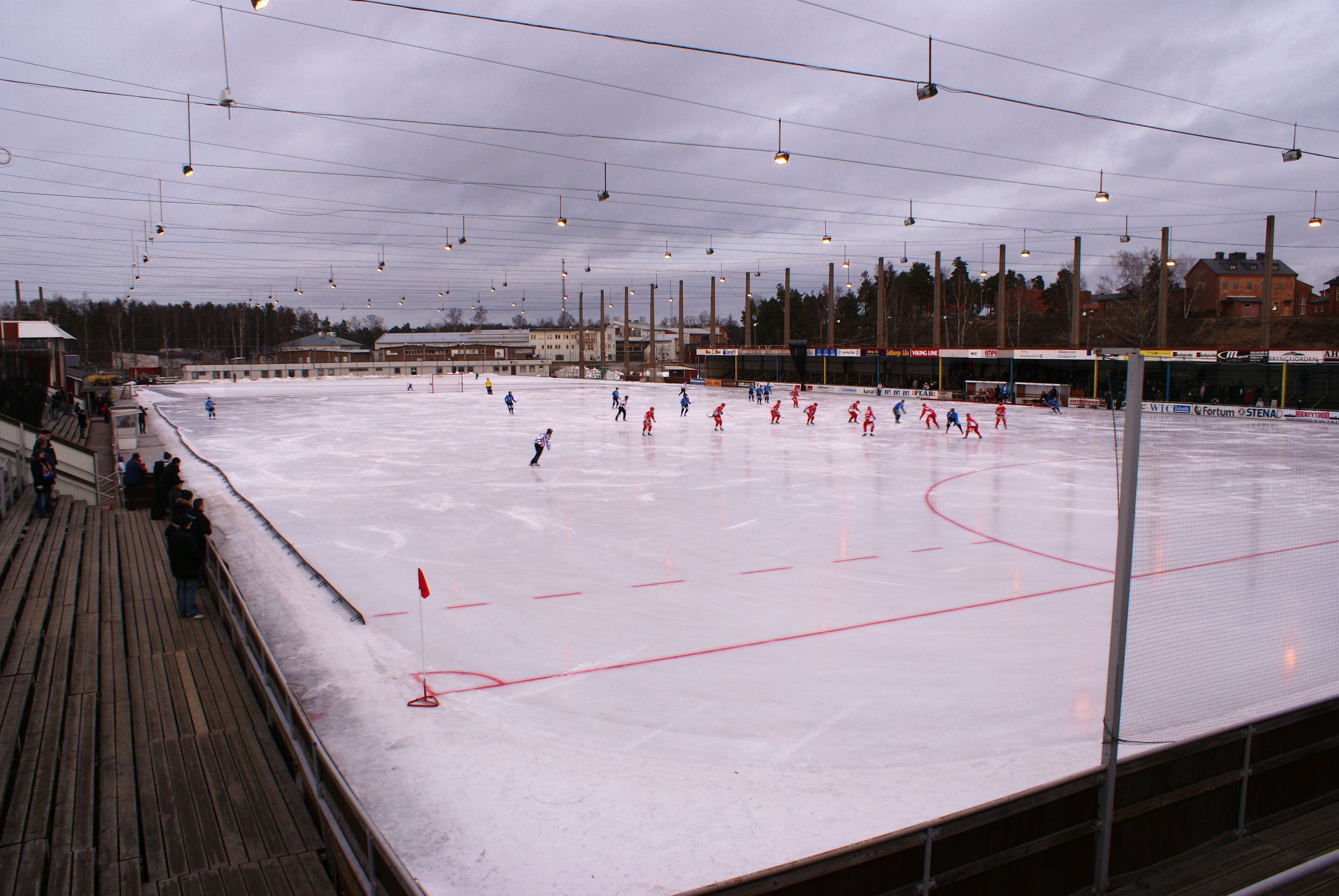
Bandy at the old Tingvalla Ice Stadium, with the former military barracks of the Värmland Regiment seen to the far right

Ice hockey is a highly popular spectator sport in Karlstad. The most popular club is Färjestad BK. The team plays in the Swedish Hockey League (SHL, highest level) and their home arena is Löfbergs Arena. The club has won the Swedish Championship several times, most recently in 2022, and is the most successful ice hockey club in Sweden since the foundation of Elitserien (Swedish Hockey League since 2013) in 1975. Several other ice hockey clubs exist and Karlstad is also represented in the 1st Division of ice hockey (3rd highest level) by the team Skåre BK. The 2010 Men's World Inline Hockey Championships was also hosted by Karlstad, with Löfbergs Arena as the primary site of the tournament.

Traditionally, bandy has been the most popular winter sport in Karlstad, and the city is the home of two of the historically most successful clubs in Sweden, IF Boltic and IF Karlstad-Göta. Boltic reached 10 Swedish finals in a row from 1979 to 1988. They won the first 7 and the one in 1988. They also won in 1995. In 2000, the two clubs merged into BS BolticGöta. The first team again played as IF Boltic since the winter 2008/2009. After a successful season in Allsvenskan 2009/2010 the team qualified for Elitserien, but was again relegated for the 2011/2012 season. Boltic's general meeting decided in 2014 to take back the club's old name IF Boltic. And Karlstad-Göta does not have a bandy team anymore. The home arena of Boltic, Tingvalla Ice Stadium, built in 1967, was claimed to be one of Northern Europe's largest artificially frozen areas. The outdoor stadium was demolished in 2020 and converted into an indoor rink, inaugurated in 2022. While one of many indoor bandy arenas, it is Sweden's only indoor speed skating arena. Afghans living in Karlstad has taken a liking to bandy and set up an Afghanistan national bandy team, which is based in the city.

Karlstad is a regular host of start, finish and special stages for the Swedish Rally. The competition has world championship status and is held annually in Värmland.

=== Summer sports ===
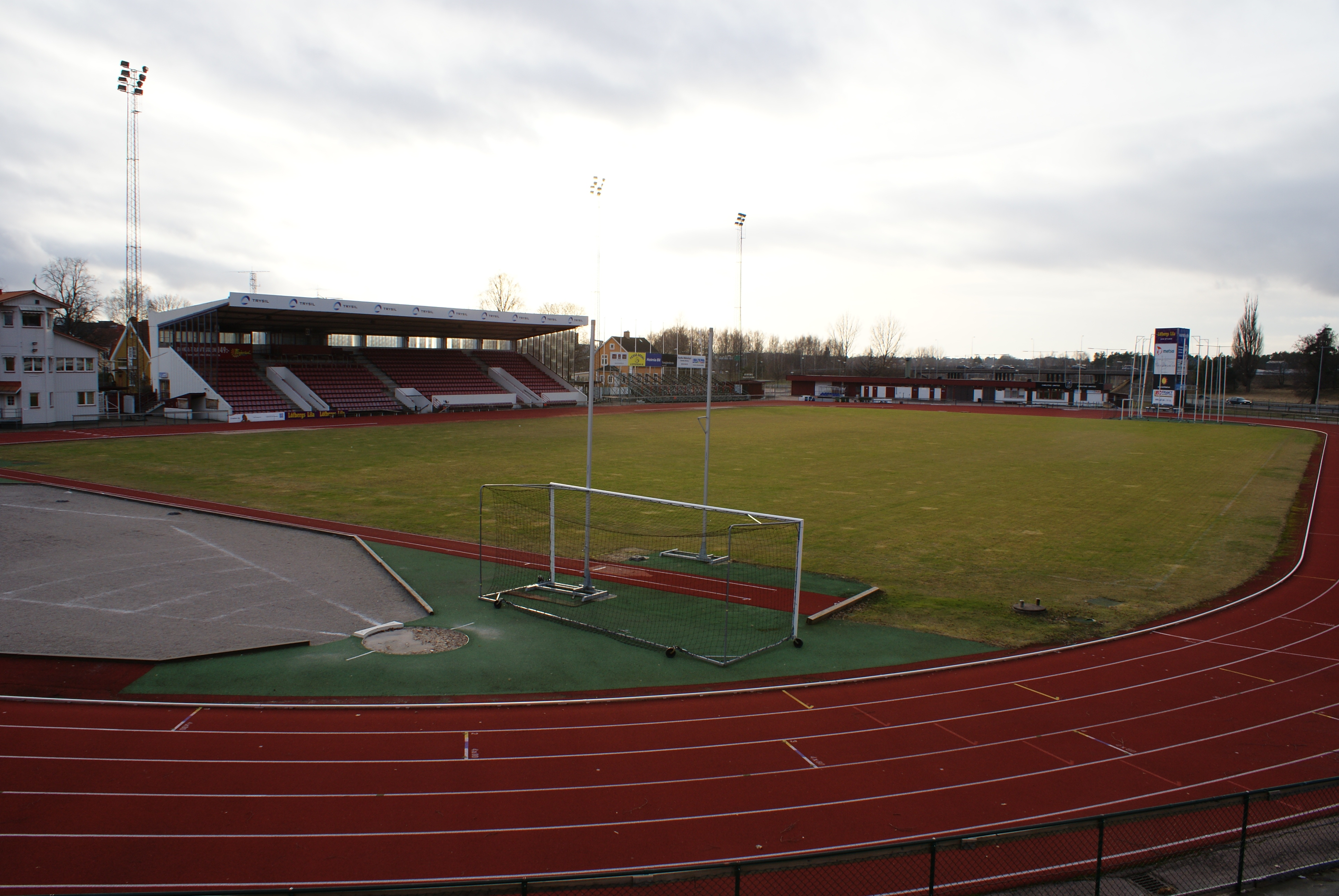
Tingvalla IP

Several football clubs exist. QBIK was founded in 1978, and entered the premier division of women's football, Damallsvenskan, in 2005. The team currently plays in the 1st Division (2nd highest level), but has several players in the Swedish national team. Their home ground is Tingvalla IP, and the facility was also the home ground for the football team Karlstad BK, that played in the men's Division 1 Norra (3rd highest level), having gained promotion following a successful 2010 season. The third highest-ranking football team was Carlstad United. The club was founded in 1998 by an alliance of seven local football clubs, with the aim of providing Karlstad with an elite football team. The club was accepted by the Swedish Football Association (SvFF) in 1999 and the team played in the men's Division 2 Norra Götaland (4th highest level). Carlstad United and Karlstad BK ended up merging into IF Karlstad Fotboll, who compete in Division 1 Norra. Another club from Karlstad is FBK Karlstad, who currently play in Division 1.

Motorcycle speedway takes place at the Kalvholmen Motorbana, situated in the southeast outskirts of the city. The team is called Solkatterna (the Sun Cats), who compete in the Swedish Speedway Team Championship.

American football is also played on Tingvalla IP. The Carlstad Crusaders play in Superserien, the highest level since the founding of the club in 1990. The team has attended eight finals, winning its first championship in 2010.

Karlstad is also famous for athletics. The club IF Göta has a number of international athletes and host the annual athletics meet Götagalan. There is an outdoor athletics track at Tingvalla IP and an indoor track (200 m) in Våxnäshallen.

Another prominent sports club in Karlstad is OK Tyr, one of the largest orienteering clubs in Sweden. OK Tyr won Tiomila in 1989 and 1990.

Karlstads Rugbyklubb is also based in the town.

=== Public facilities ===
Public sports facilities in Karlstad include Klarälvsbanan, a 90 km (56 mi) cycle path on a former railway line running north from Karlstad to Hagfors. It is popular with cyclists, inlines skaters and roller skiers.

There is also a large number of open-air beaches and bathing spots by Vänern, smaller lakes and Klarälven in the municipality, and a 25-metre (82 ft) indoor municipal swimming pool.

Many wood-chip jogging trails, some of which are lit, can be found in the city outskirts. During wintertime, several are used for cross-country skiing.

== Economy ==
In 2023, Karlstads BVP per capita was 623 thousand Swedish crowns, about 20% above the national average at the time. Karlstad has a relatively strong IT sector and a number of IT consulting companies – CombinedX, Sogeti, CGI Inc., Tieto. Telia Group has a global network operation center in the city.

== Climate ==
Karlstad has a humid continental climate (Dfb) with influence from the surrounding waters of Vänern and the inflow from the Atlantic Ocean. It has large differences between seasons and is moderately influenced by both marine and land airflows. The highest recorded temperature since 1901 is 34.0 °C (93.2 °F) in July 1933 and the lowest is -36.0 °C (-32.8 °F) from February 1966.

Climate data for Karlstad Airport (1991-2020 averages; 2008–2018 precipitation for Väse; 2002-2020 average record highs and lows and sunshine hours; extremes 1901–present)
Month	Jan	Feb	Mar	Apr	May	Jun	Jul	Aug	Sep	Oct	Nov	Dec	Year
Record high °C (°F)	10.2 (50.4)	13.9 (57.0)	20.1 (68.2)	25.8 (78.4)	29.0 (84.2)	32.5 (90.5)	34.0 (93.2)	32.0 (89.6)	25.2 (77.4)	20.0 (68.0)	17.1 (62.8)	11.5 (52.7)	34.0 (93.2)
Mean maximum °C (°F)	6.3 (43.3)	6.9 (44.4)	12.8 (55.0)	18.4 (65.1)	24.6 (76.3)	26.8 (80.2)	28.6 (83.5)	26.8 (80.2)	22.1 (71.8)	16.1 (61.0)	11.0 (51.8)	7.4 (45.3)	29.5 (85.1)
Mean daily maximum °C (°F)	0.3 (32.5)	0.8 (33.4)	4.7 (40.5)	10.6 (51.1)	15.9 (60.6)	19.7 (67.5)	22.0 (71.6)	20.7 (69.3)	16.0 (60.8)	9.8 (49.6)	4.6 (40.3)	1.4 (34.5)	10.6 (51.1)
Daily mean °C (°F)	−2.7 (27.1)	−2.6 (27.3)	0.6 (33.1)	5.3 (41.5)	10.2 (50.4)	14.2 (57.6)	16.8 (62.2)	15.7 (60.3)	11.5 (52.7)	6.3 (43.3)	1.9 (35.4)	−1.6 (29.1)	6.3 (43.3)
Mean daily minimum °C (°F)	−5.6 (21.9)	−6.0 (21.2)	−3.5 (25.7)	0.1 (32.2)	4.6 (40.3)	8.8 (47.8)	11.5 (52.7)	10.7 (51.3)	6.9 (44.4)	2.8 (37.0)	−0.8 (30.6)	−4.6 (23.7)	2.1 (35.7)
Mean minimum °C (°F)	−17.1 (1.2)	−14.8 (5.4)	−11.9 (10.6)	−5.2 (22.6)	−1.1 (30.0)	4.3 (39.7)	7.7 (45.9)	4.9 (40.8)	0.2 (32.4)	−4.4 (24.1)	−8.5 (16.7)	−14.4 (6.1)	−19.5 (−3.1)
Record low °C (°F)	−32.5 (−26.5)	−36.0 (−32.8)	−26.9 (−16.4)	−18.4 (−1.1)	−5.0 (23.0)	−1.8 (28.8)	2.0 (35.6)	1.0 (33.8)	−5.0 (23.0)	−12.0 (10.4)	−19.9 (−3.8)	−28.0 (−18.4)	−36.0 (−32.8)
Average precipitation mm (inches)	50 (2.0)	35 (1.4)	35 (1.4)	50 (2.0)	55 (2.2)	65 (2.6)	60 (2.4)	85 (3.3)	65 (2.6)	75 (3.0)	70 (2.8)	55 (2.2)	700 (27.9)
Mean monthly sunshine hours	47	69	168	219	261	287	271	223	174	108	52	44	1,923
Source 1:
Source 2:

== Notable residents ==
- Carl Adolph Agardh (1785–1859), botanist specializing in algae, died in Karlstad
- Adam Alsing, radio and television host
- Jonas Brodin, National Hockey League ice hockey player
- Lena Cronqvist (d. 2025), painter, sculptor
- Niklas Edin, 2013 World Men's Curling Champion
- JH Engström, contemporary photographer
- Joel Eriksson Ek, ice hockey player, Ice Hockey World Championship winner
- Nils Ferlin, poet
- Jenny Fransson, wrestler
- Gustaf Fröding, poet
- Håkan Hedenmalm, mathematician
- Stefan Holm, high jumper, 2004 Olympic gold medalist
- Jan Jörnmark, author and economic historian
- Oscar Klefbom, ice hockey player
- Anders Kulläng, rally driver
- Zarah Leander, UFA actress
- Lina Länsberg, professional mixed martial artist and two times gold medalist in the IFMA World Championship in Muay Thai
- Martin Molin, composer, inventor, and member of the band Wintergatan
- Jan Nilsson, racing driver
- Thomas Rhodin, ice hockey player (four times Swedish Champion with Färjestads BK)
- Christer Sjögren, rock/dansband singer (Vikingarna)
- Ulf Sterner, ice hockey player (first European schooled player to play in the National Hockey League)
- Mikaela Åhlin-Kottulinsky, racing driver

== Twin towns – sister cities ==
Karlstad is twinned with:

- Moss, Norway
- Nokia, Finland
- Horsens, Denmark
- Jõgeva, Estonia
- Blönduós, Iceland
- Gaziantep, Turkey

== Image gallery ==
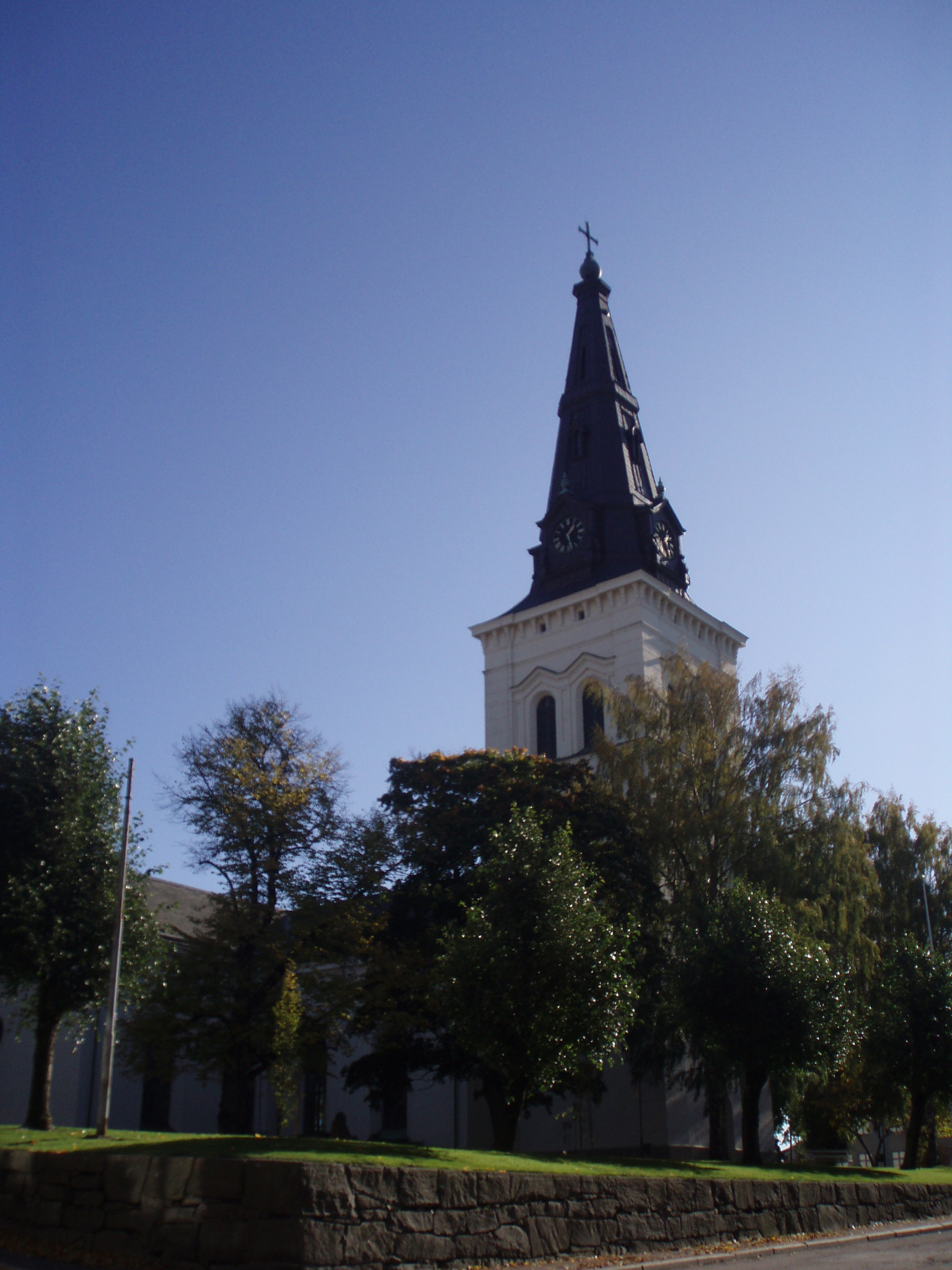
Karlstad Cathedral

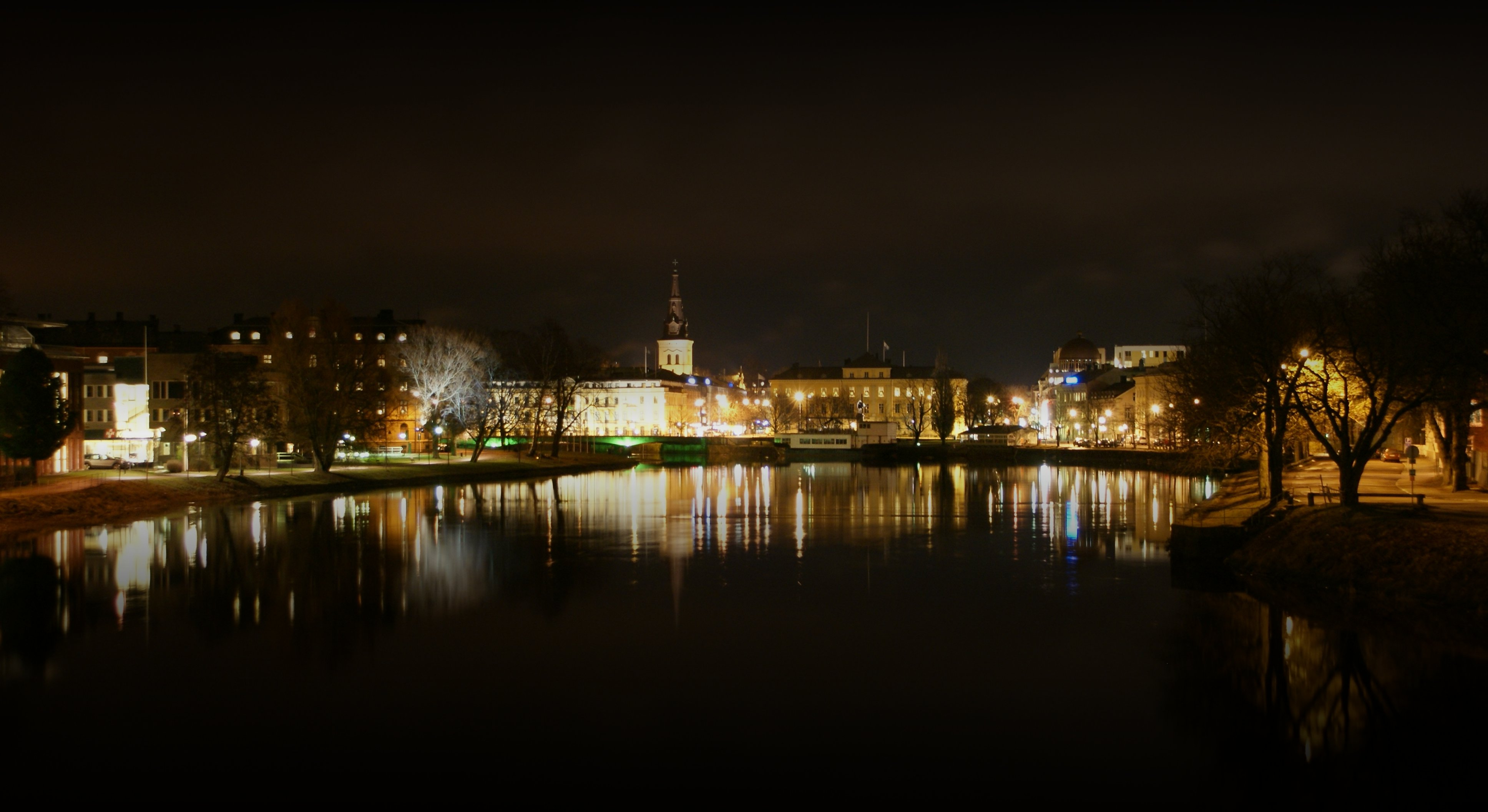
Karlstad from the Klaraborg Bridge

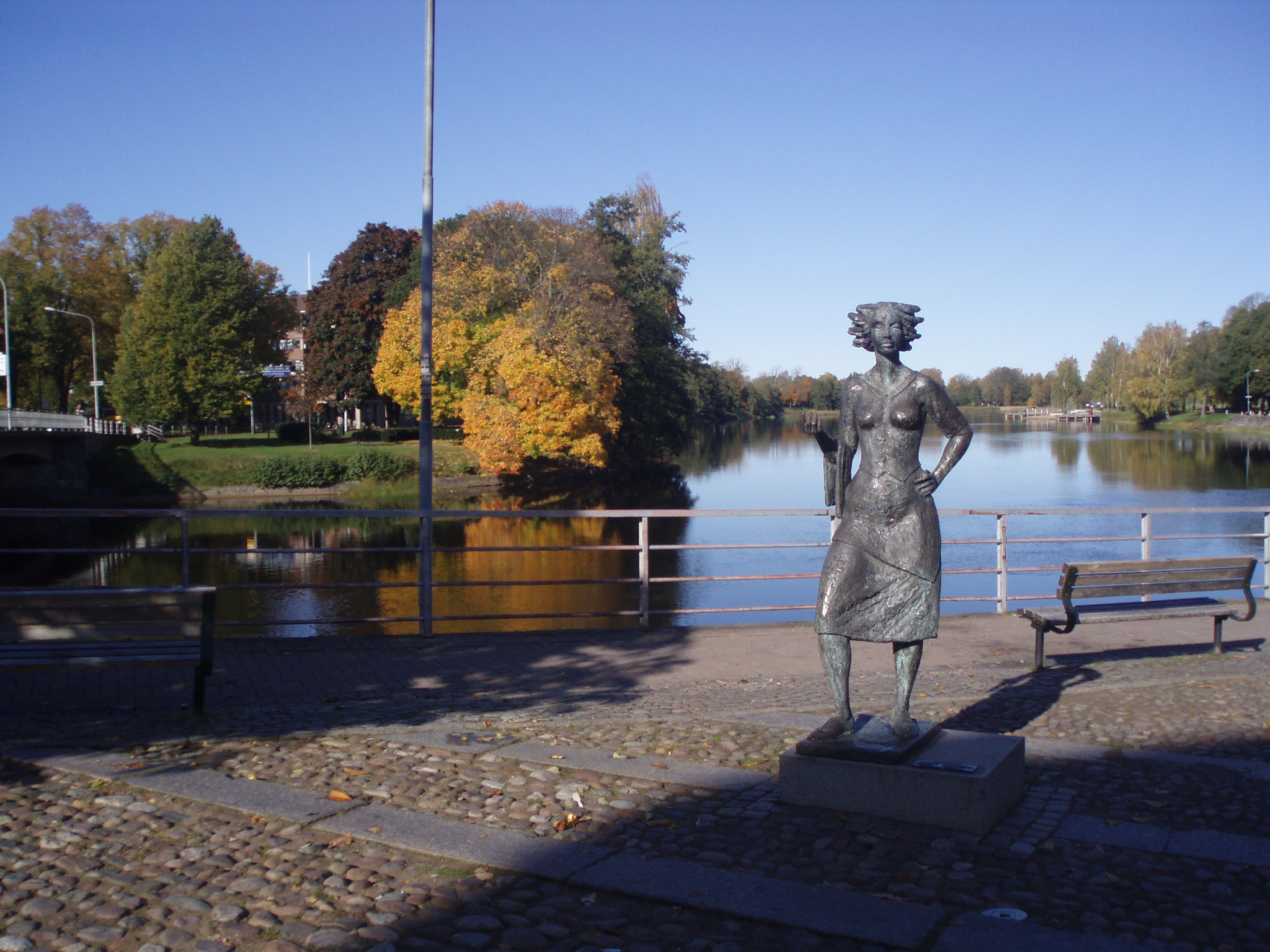
Statue of Sola i Karlstad, next to Klarälven

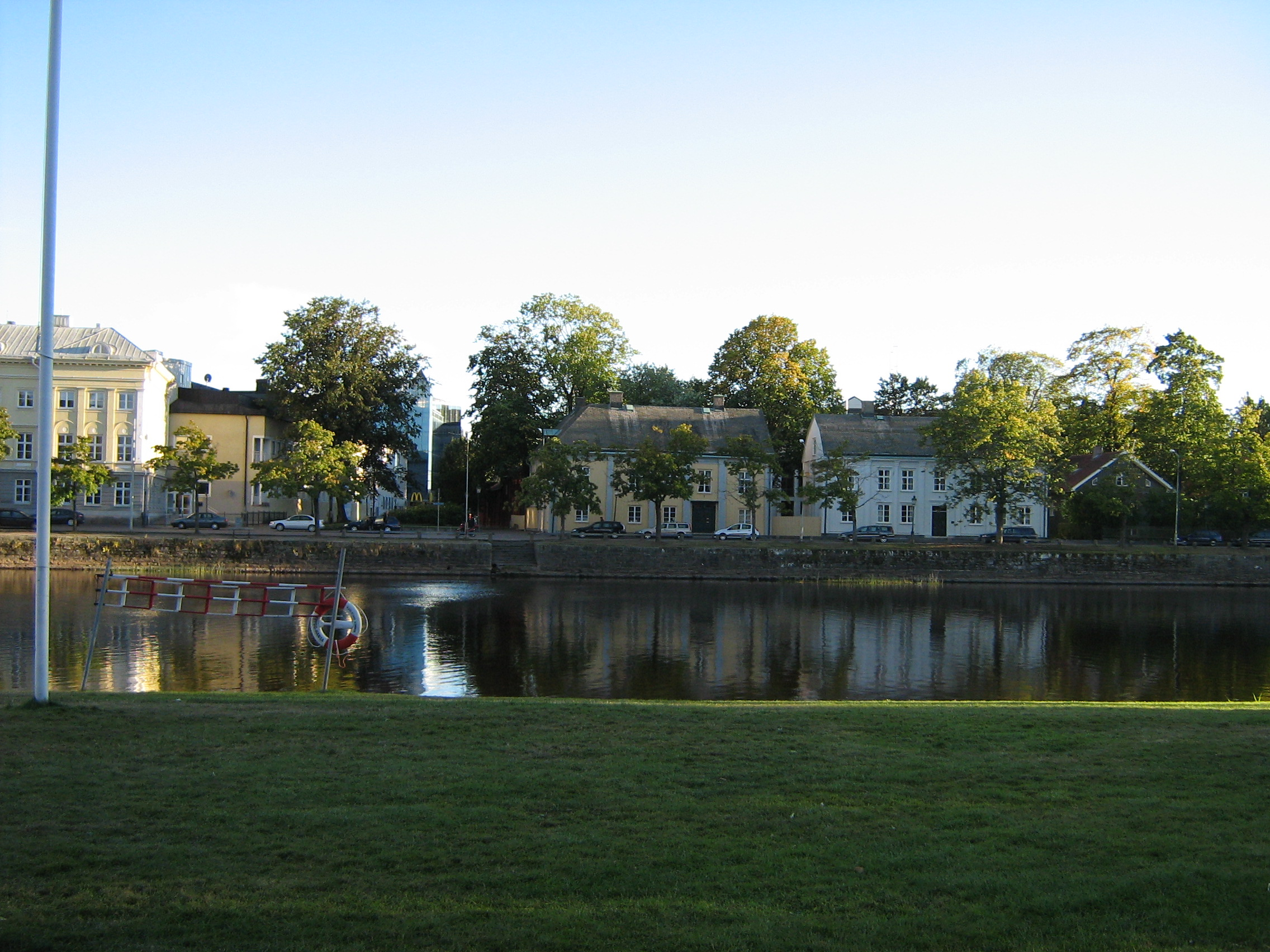
Wooden houses that survived the fire in 1865
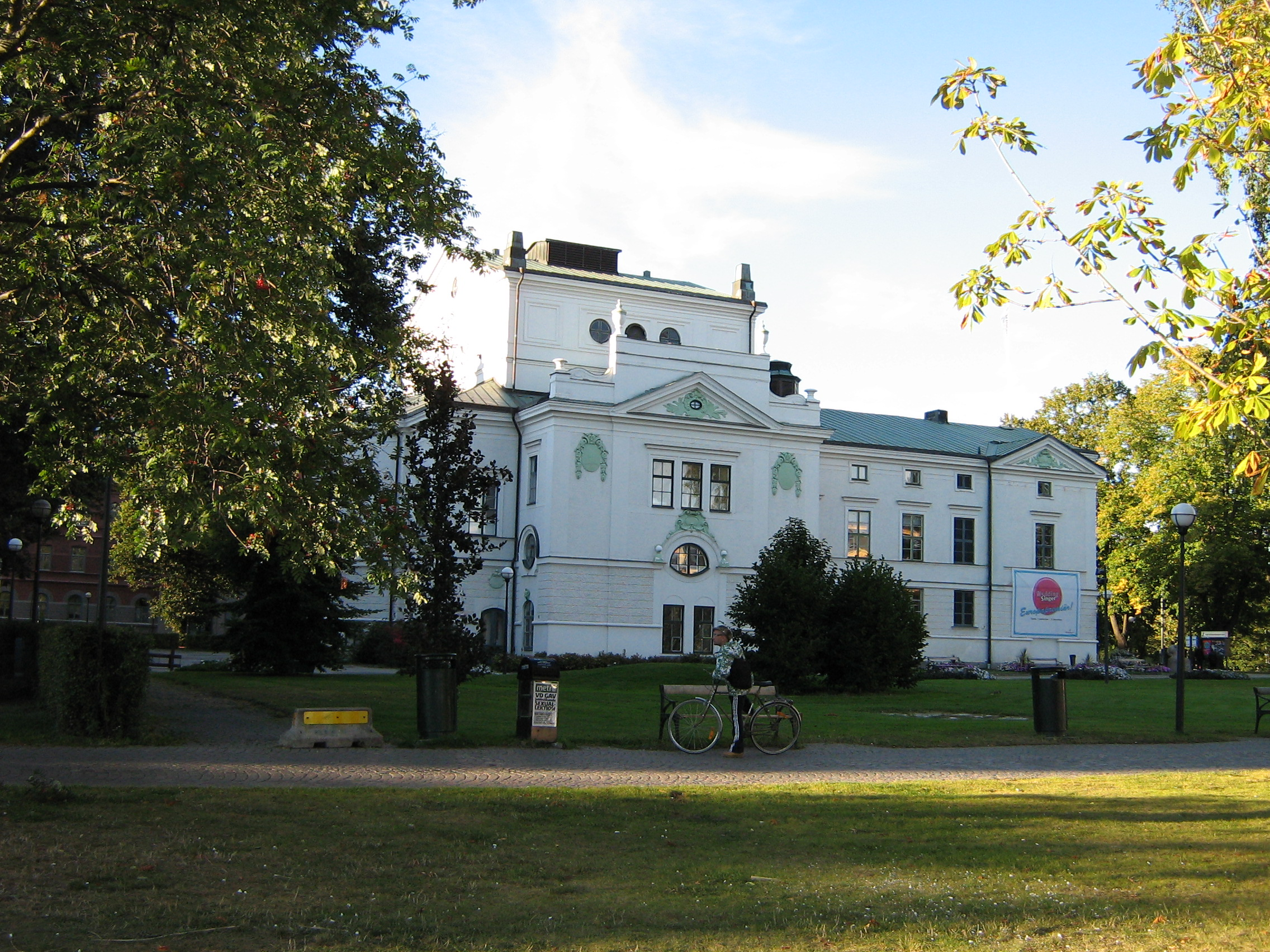
Karlstad Theatre, a theatre and the home of the Wermland Opera

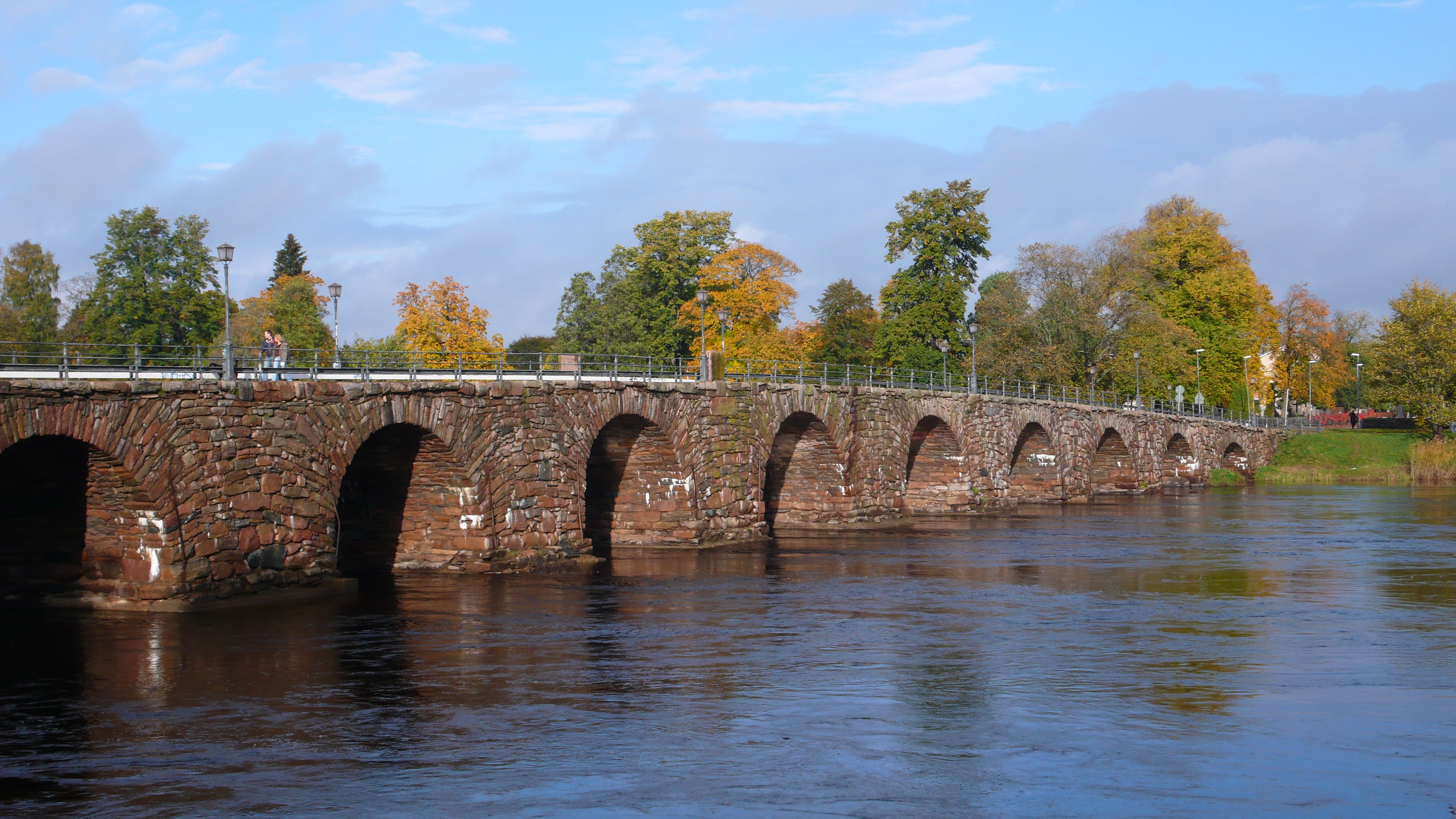
The East Bridge

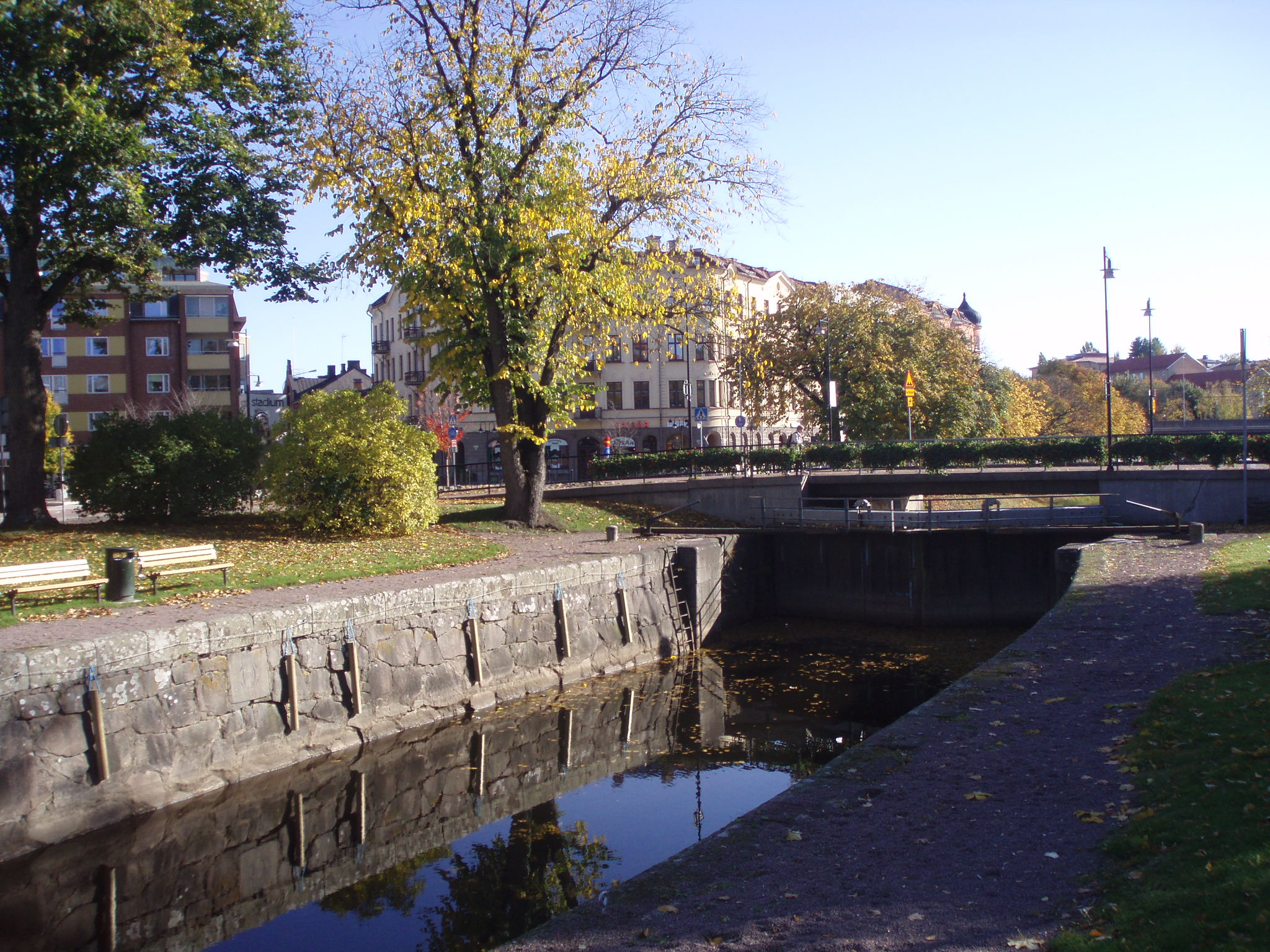
Carlarnas sluss, a lock from the early 19th century

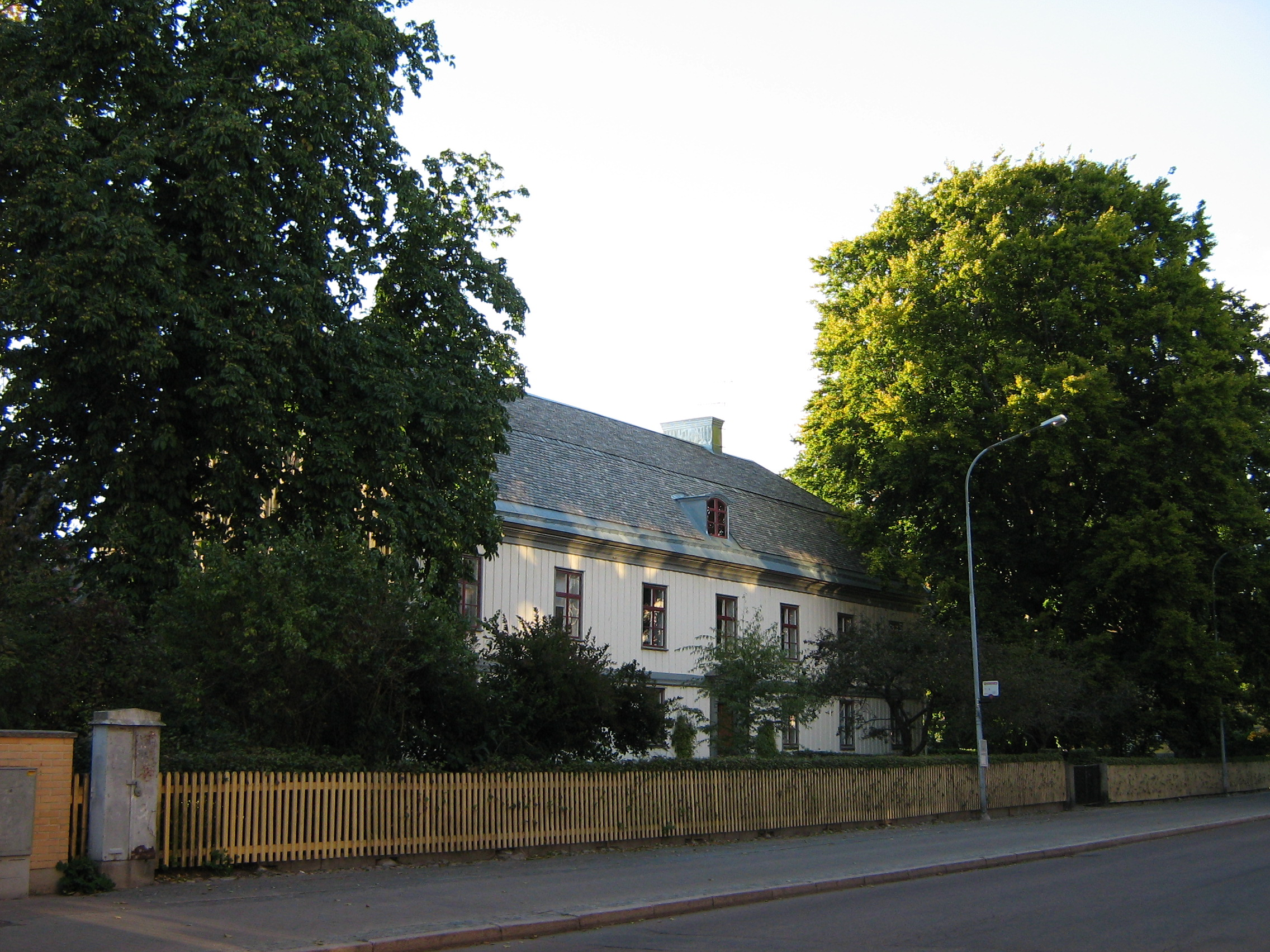
The Bishops House
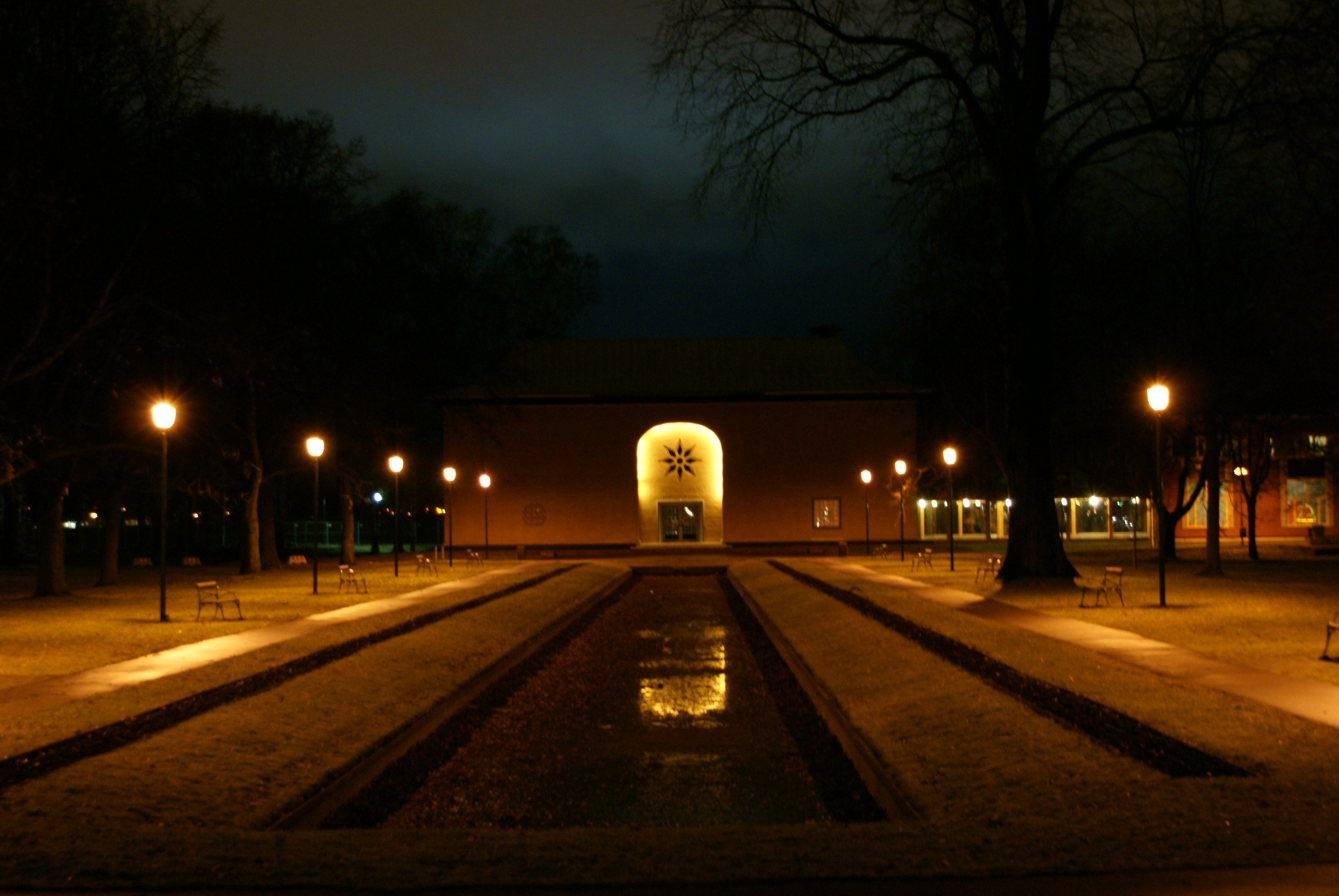
Värmland Museum by night

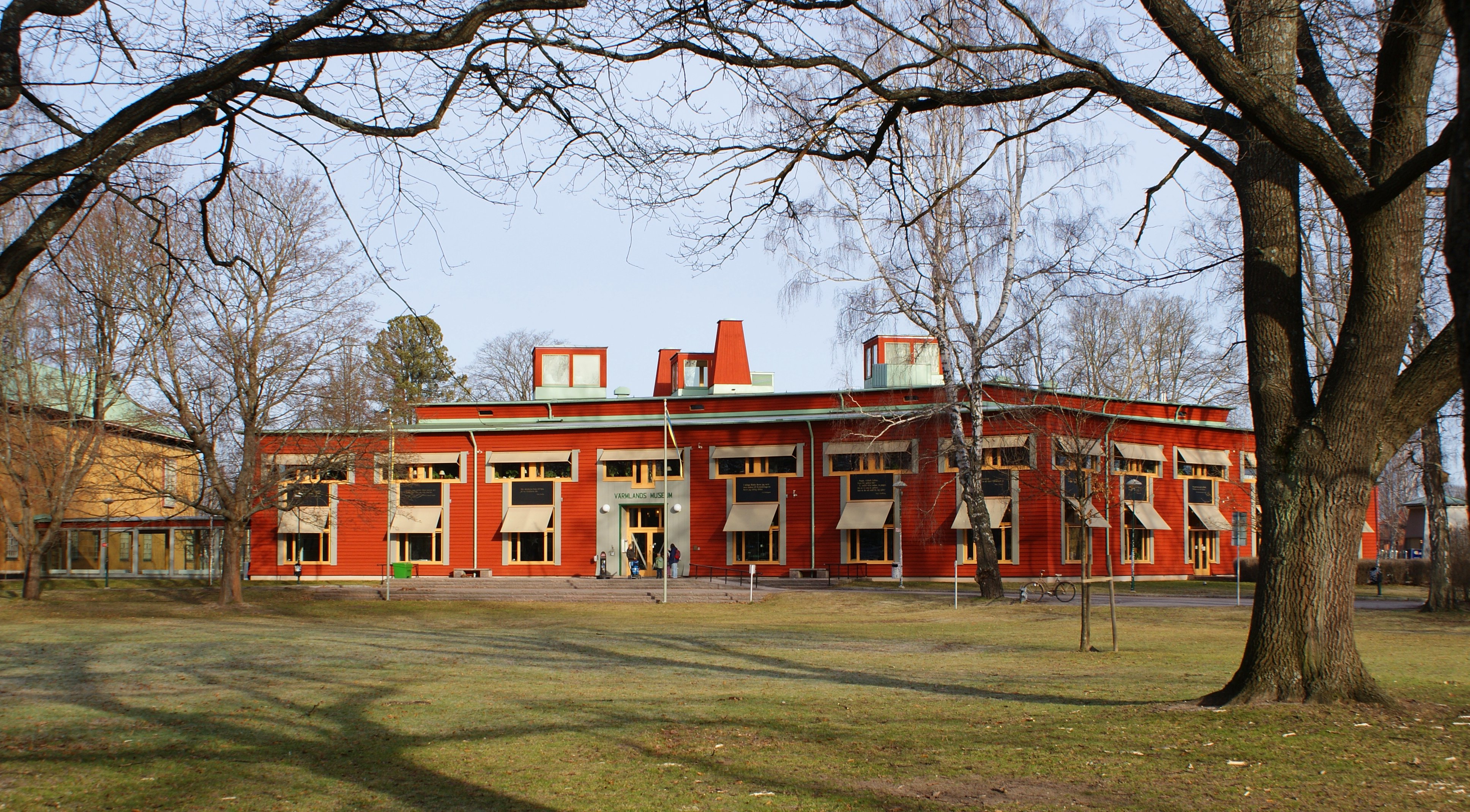
The new part of Värmland Museum

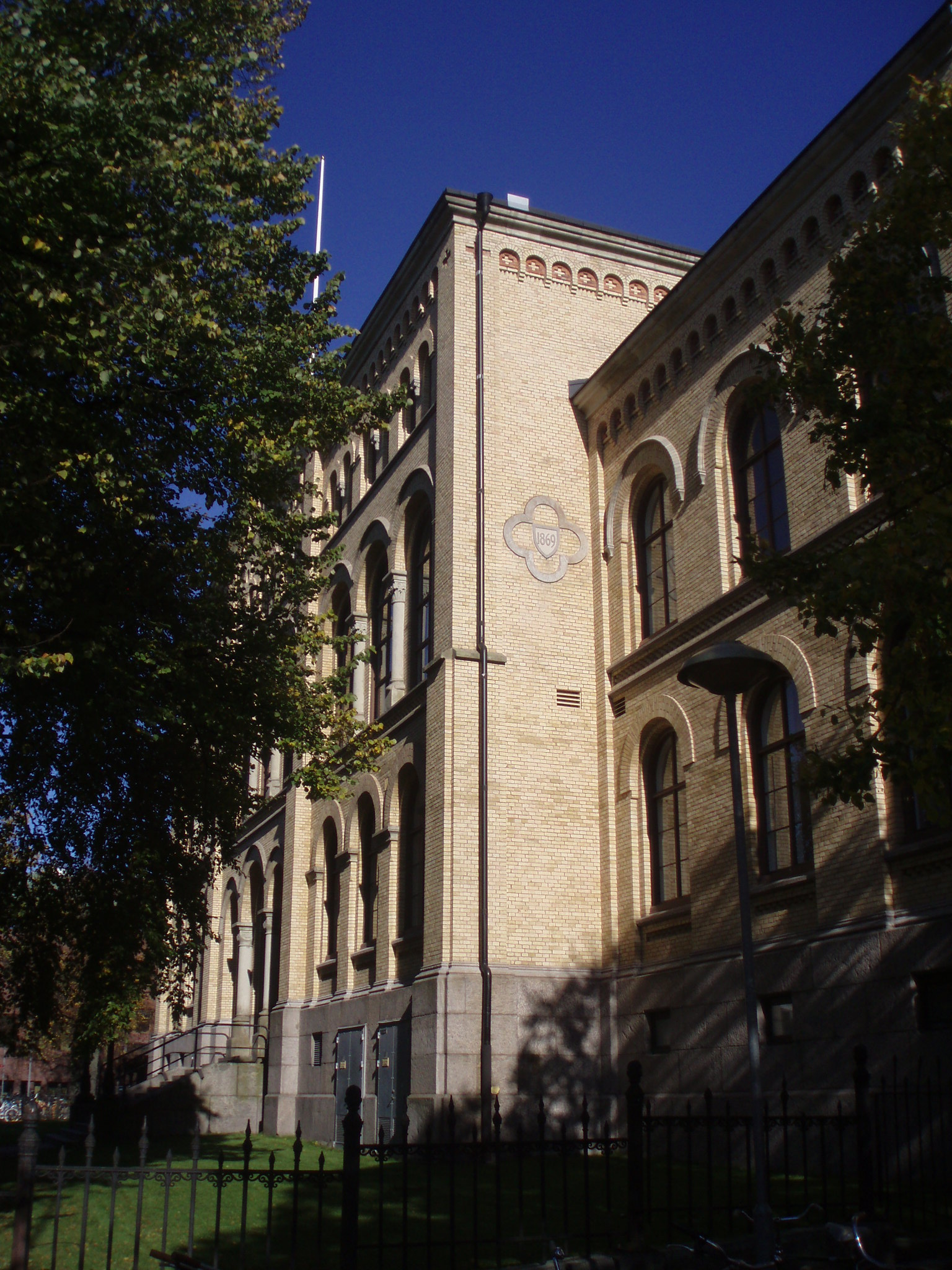
Tingvalla upper secondary school

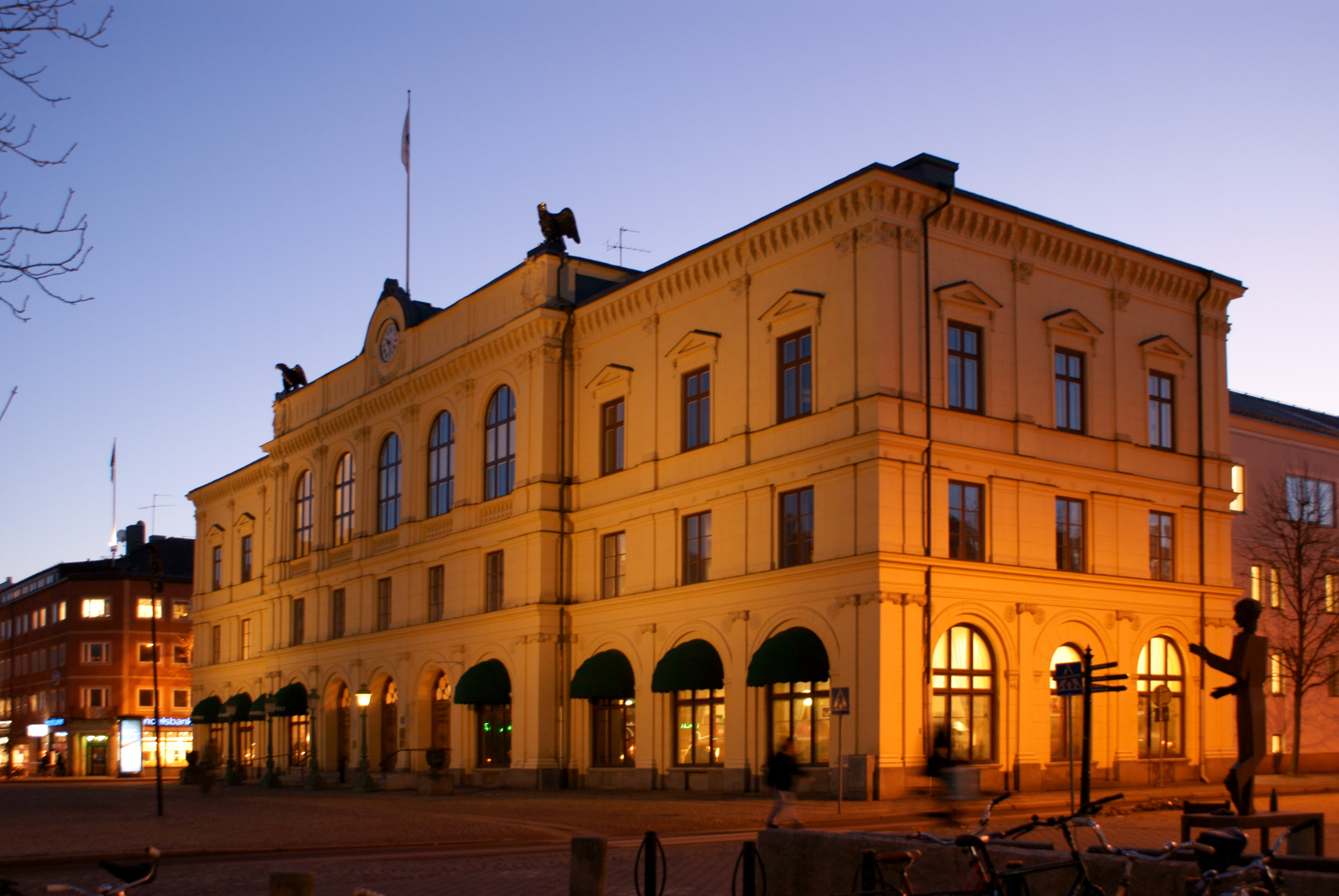
Karlstad Town Hall

== See also ==
- Karlstad Airport
- Karlstad University
- Swedish American Center
