= Hakan Hedenmalm =

Swedish mathematician

Håkan Hedenmalm (born August 25, 1961, in Karlstad) is a Swedish mathematician working in harmonic analysis, complex analysis, probability theory and mathematical physics. He earned his PhD from Uppsala University, under Yngve Domar, at the age of 24. Hedenmalm is among the most prolific descendents of the Carleson-Domar Swedish school of mathematics.

== Career ==
Hedenmalm has been a pioneer of several modern branches of mathematical analysis. His work opened new directions at the crossroads of complex analysis, harmonic analysis, probability and partial differential equations. In the early stages of his career he has mainly contributed to the development of the theory of Bergman spaces and spaces of Dirichlet series. After 2010, Hedenmalm became interested in complex normal random matrices. His fundamental work in analytic and polyanalytic ensembles, in collaboration with Ameur, Makarov and with his PhD students Haimi and Wennman, launched the foundations of the emerging field of planar random processes. Among his most important contributions to this field is the proof of the universality of the complementary error function kernel, in a joint work with Wennman, where the foliation flow method has been introduced to overcome the limitations of Riemann-Hilbert methods. Also during this period, Hedenmalm developed a new approach to the Klein–Gordon equation, connecting the solutions of this relativistic wave equation to dynamical systems, ergodic theory, and operator theory. This lead, in particular, to the theory of Hyperbolic Fourier series, put forward in collaboration with Montes-Rodríguez and Viazovska. In 1996 he became a professor at Lund University and in 1997 he was elected to KFS, the Royal Physiographic Society in Lund. Later, in 2018, he was elected to DKNVS, the Royal Norwegian Society of Sciences and Letters in Trondheim.

Hedenmalm has collaborated with a number of other mathematicians, in particular with Alexander Borichev, Serguei Shimorin, Kristian Seip, Joaquim Ortega-Cerdà, Danylo Radchenko, Maryna Viazovska, and Nikolai Makarov. Since 2002 he is professor at the Royal Institute of Technology (KTH) in Stockholm.

== Selected publications ==
Hedenmalm, Håkan; Wennman, Aron (2021). "Planar orthogonal polynomials and boundary universality in the random normal matrix model". Acta Mathematica. 227 (2): 309–406. arXiv:1710.06493. doi:10.4310/ACTA.2021.v227.n2.a3.

Bakan, Andrew; Hedenmalm, Haakan; Montes-Rodríguez, Alfonso; Radchenko, Danylo; Viazovska, Maryna (2021). "Fourier uniqueness in even dimensions". Proceedings of the National Academy of Sciences. 118 (15) e2023227118. arXiv:2007.03981. doi:10.1073/pnas.2023227118.

Hedenmalm, Håkan; Montes-Rodríguez, Alfonso (2011). "Heisenberg uniqueness pairs and the Klein-Gordon equation". Annals of Mathematics. 173 (3): 1507–1527. arXiv:0910.0763. doi:10.4007/annals.2011.173.3.6.

Ameur, Yacin; Hedenmalm, Håkan; Makarov, Nikolai (2010). "Berezin transform in polynomial Bergman spaces". Communications on Pure and Applied Mathematics. 63 (12): 1533–1584. arXiv:0807.0369. doi:10.1002/cpa.20329.

Hedenmalm, Håkan; Lindqvist, Peter; Seip, Kristian (1997). "A Hilbert space of Dirichlet series and systems of dilated functions in $L^2(0,1)$". Duke Mathematical Journal. 86 (1): 1–37. arXiv:math/9512211. doi:10.1215/S0012-7094-97-08601-4.

Hedenmalm, Håkan (1991). "A factorization theorem for square area-integrable analytic functions". Journal für die reine und angewandte Mathematik. 1991 (422): 45–68. doi:10.1515/crll.1991.422.45.

Haimi, Antti; Hedenmalm, Håkan (2013). "The polyanalytic Ginibre ensembles". Journal of Statistical Physics. 153 (1): 10–47. arXiv:1106.2975. doi:10.1007/s10955-013-0813-x.

== Distinctions ==
He received the Wallenberg Prize in 1992, and in 1996 he was invited speaker at 2ECM (second European Congress of Mathematicians) in Budapest.

In 2000 he received the Göran Gustafsson Prize (KVA). In 2015, he received the Eva and Lars Gårding Prize from KFS, the Royal Physiographic Society in Lund.

== Bibliography ==
- Hedenmalm, Håkan; Wennman, Aron (December 2021). "Planar orthogonal polynomials and boundary universality in the random normal matrix model". Acta Mathematica. 227 (2): 309–406. arXiv:1710.06493. doi:10.4310/ACTA.2021.v227.n2.a3.
- Hedenmalm, Håkan; Montes-Rodríguez, Alfonso (2011). "Heisenberg uniqueness pairs and the Klein-Gordon equation". Annals of Mathematics. 173 (3): 1507–1527. arXiv:0910.1246. doi:10.4007/annals.2011.173.3.6.
- Hedenmalm, Håkan (1989). "Translates of functions of two variables". Duke Mathematical Journal. 58: 251–297. doi:10.1215/S0012-7094-89-05813-4.
- Hedenmalm, Håkan (1991). "A factorization theorem for square area-integrable analytic functions". Journal für die reine und angewandte Mathematik. 422: 45–68. doi:10.1515/crll.1991.422.45.
- Hedenmalm, Håkan (1993). "An invariant subspace of the Bergman space having the codimension two property". Journal für die reine und angewandte Mathematik. 443: 45–68. doi:10.1515/crll.1991.422.45.
- Borichev, Alexander; Hedenmalm, Håkan (1995). "Completeness of translates in weighted spaces on the half-line". Acta Mathematica. 174 (1): 1–84. doi:10.1007/BF02392801.
- Hedenmalm, Håkan; Richter, Stefan; Seip, Kristian (1996). "Interpolating sequences and invariant subspaces of given index in the Bergman spaces". Journal für die reine und angewandte Mathematik. 477: 13–30. doi:10.1515/crll.1996.477.13.
- Hedenmalm, Håkan; Lindqvist, Peter; Seip, Kristian (1997). "A Hilbert space of Dirichlet series and systems of dilated functions in $L^2(0,1)$". Duke Mathematical Journal. 86 (1): 1–37. arXiv:math/9512211. doi:10.1215/S0012-7094-97-08601-4.
- Borichev, Alexander; Hedenmalm, Håkan (1997). "Harmonic functions of maximal growth: invertibility and cyclicity in Bergman spaces". Journal of the American Mathematical Society. 10 (4): 761–796. doi:10.1090/S0894-0347-97-00244-0.
- Gordon, Julia; Hedenmalm, Håkan (1999). "The composition operators on the space of Dirichlet series with square summable coefficients". Michigan Mathematical Journal. 46 (2): 313–329. doi:10.1307/mmj/1030132413.
- Hedenmalm, Håkan; Shimorin, Sergei (2002). "Hele-Shaw flow on hyperbolic surfaces". Journal de Mathématiques Pures et Appliquées. 81 (3): 187–222. doi:10.1016/S0021-7824(01)01222-3.
- Hedenmalm, Håkan; Jakobsson, Stefan; Shimorin, Sergei (2002). "A biharmonic maximum principle for hyperbolic surfaces". Journal für die reine und angewandte Mathematik. 550: 25–75. doi:10.1515/crll.2002.074.
- Hedenmalm, Håkan; Shimorin, Sergei (2005). "Weighted Bergman spaces and the integral means spectrum of conformal mappings". Duke Mathematical Journal. 127 (2): 341–393. arXiv:math/0406345. doi:10.1215/S0012-7094-04-12725-3.
- Baranov, Anton; Hedenmalm, Håkan (2008). "Boundary properties of Green functions in the plane". Duke Mathematical Journal. 145 (1): 1–24. arXiv:math/0608493. doi:10.1215/00127094-2008-044.
- Ameur, Yacin; Makarov, Nikolai; Hedenmalm, Håkan (2010). "Berezin transform in polynomial Bergman spaces". Communications on Pure and Applied Mathematics. 63 (12): 1533–1584. arXiv:0807.0369. doi:10.1002/cpa.20329.
- Ameur, Yacin; Makarov, Nikolai; Hedenmalm, Håkan (2011). "Fluctuations of eigenvalues of random normal matrices". Duke Mathematical Journal. 159 (1): 31–81. arXiv:0807.0375. doi:10.1215/00127094-1384782.
- Makarov, Nikolai; Hedenmalm, Håkan (2013). "Coulomb gas ensembles and Laplacian growth". Proceedings of the London Mathematical Society. Series 3. 106 (4): 859–907.
- Haimi, Antti; Makarov, Nikolai (2013). "The polyanalytic Ginibre ensembles". Journal of Statistical Physics. 153 (1): 10–47. arXiv:1106.2975. doi:10.1007/s10955-013-0813-x.
- Borichev, Alexander; Hedenmalm, Håkan (2014). "Weighted integrability of polyharmonic functions". Advances in Mathematics. 264: 464–505. arXiv:1211.5088. doi:10.1016/j.aim.2014.07.020.
- Haimi, Antti; Makarov, Nikolai (2014). "Asymptotic expansion of polyanalytic Bergman kernels". Journal of Functional Analysis. 267 (12): 4667–4731. arXiv:1303.0720. doi:10.1016/j.jfa.2014.09.002.
- Hedenmalm, Håkan (2017). "Bloch functions and asymptotic tail variance". Advances in Mathematics. 313: 947–990. arXiv:1509.06630. doi:10.1016/j.aim.2017.04.016.
- Hedenmalm, Håkan (2020). "Bloch functions, asymptotic variance, and geometric zero packing". American Journal of Mathematics. 142 (1): 267–321. arXiv:1602.03358. doi:10.1353/ajm.2020.0007.
