= Lilian Matthiesen =

Mathematician

Lilian Matthiesen (born 1984) is a mathematician whose research involves analytic number theory including the application of Fourier analysis to Diophantine geometry. Educated in England, she has worked in France, Germany, and Sweden, and is University Professor in the Mathematics Institute of the University of Göttingen in Germany.

== Education and career ==
Matthiesen earned a Ph.D. at the University of Cambridge in England in 2012, with the dissertation Applications of the nilpotent Hardy–Littlewood method supervised by Ben Green.

After postdoctoral research at the University of Bristol, and in France at Paris-Sud University and the Institut de mathématiques de Jussieu – Paris Rive Gauche, she became an assistant professor at Leibniz University Hannover in Germany in 2015. She moved to the KTH Royal Institute of Technology in Stockholm in 2016, and became an associate professor there, before taking a position as University Professor in the Mathematics Institute of the University of Göttingen in Germany.

== Recognition ==
Matthiesen was the 2020 recipient of the Göran Gustafsson Prize, a 2023 recipient of the Wallenberg Prize of the Swedish Mathematical Society, and the 2024 recipient of the Tage Erlander Prize of the Royal Swedish Academy of Sciences.
