= Yuriy Drozd =

Ukrainian mathematician (born 1944)

- Ukrainian: Юрій Анатолійович Дрозд
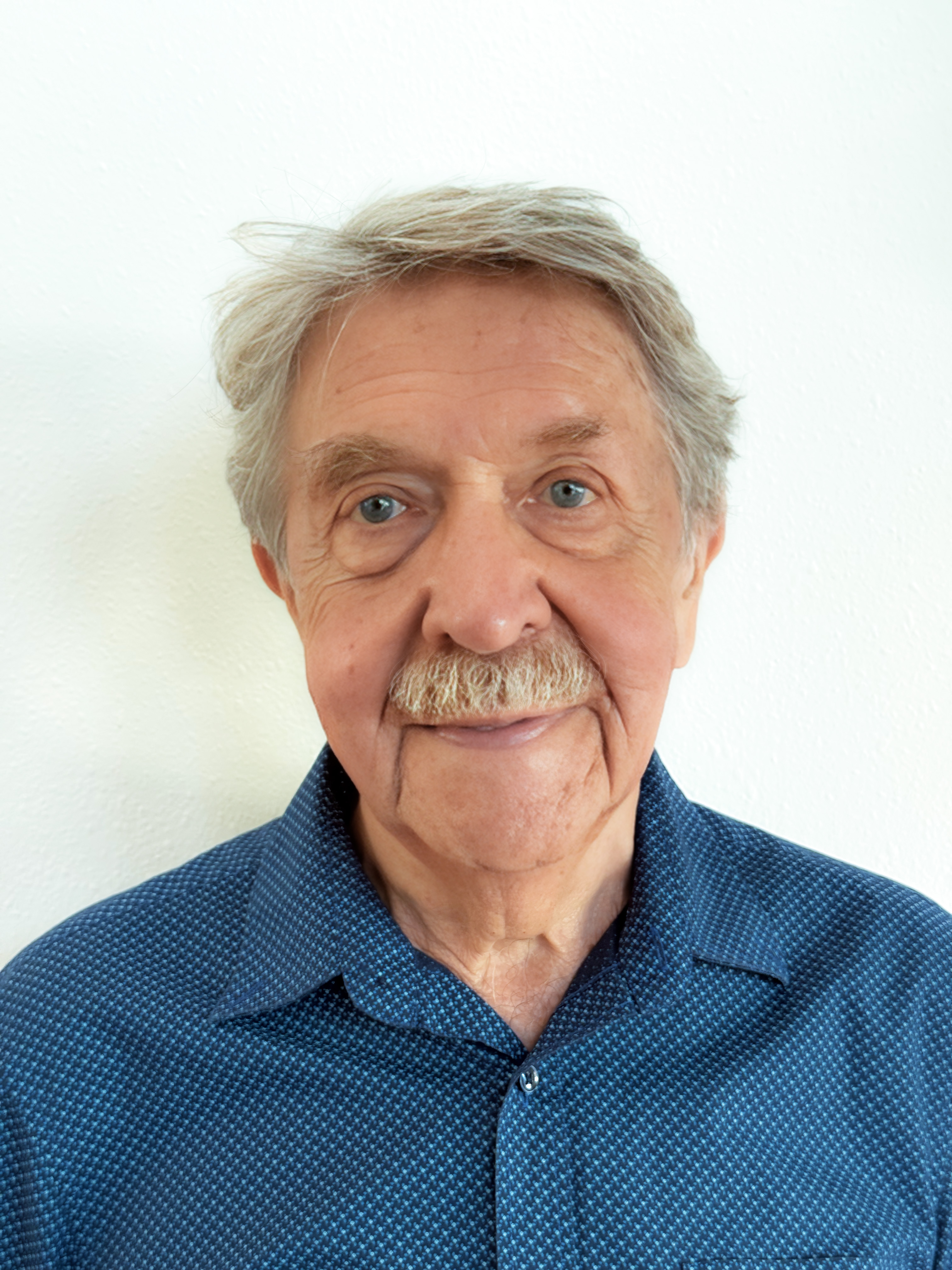
- Born: 15 October 1944 (age 82); Kyiv, Ukrainian SSR
- Education: Taras Shevchenko National University of Kyiv, Steklov Institute of Mathematics
- Awards: State Prize of Ukraine in Science and Technology
- Scientific career
- Fields: mathematics, algebra, representation theory, algebraic geometry
- Workplaces: Institute of Mathematics of NAS of Ukraine, Harvard University
- Doctoral advisor: Igor Shafarevich
- Doctoral students: Vyacheslav Futorny, Volodymyr Mazorchuk
- Website: www.imath.kiev.ua/~drozd/

Yuriy Drozd (Ukrainian: Юрій Анатолійович Дрозд also spelled Yurii Drozd; born October 15, 1944) is a Ukrainian mathematician working primarily in algebra. He is a Corresponding Member of the National Academy of Sciences of Ukraine and head of the Department of Algebra and Topology at the Institute of Mathematics of the National Academy of Sciences of Ukraine.

== Education ==
Drozd graduated from Kyiv University in 1966, pursuing a postgraduate degree at the Institute of Mathematics of the National Academy of Sciences of Ukraine in 1969. His PhD dissertation On Some Questions of the Theory of Integral Representations (1970) was supervised by Igor Shafarevich.

== Career ==
From 1969 to 2006 Drozd worked at the Faculty of Mechanics and Mathematics at Taras Shevchenko National University of Kyiv (at first as lecturer, then as associate professor and full professor). From 1980 to 1998 he headed the Department of Algebra and Mathematical Logic. Since 2006 he has been the head of the Department of Algebra and Topology (until 2014 - the Department of Algebra) of the Institute of Mathematics of the National Academy of Sciences of Ukraine.

An author of highly-cited textbooks, Drozd co-authored with V. Kirichenko the monograph "Finite Dimensional Algebras," which has been translated into English, Spanish, and Chinese and is considered a standard reference worldwide. His other textbooks on algebraic geometry, Galois theory, and algebraic numbers are widely used in Ukraine and internationally, further attesting to his impact as an educator. He has been instrumental in advancing the Kyiv algebraic school, mentoring many prominent mathematicians. He supervised at least 33 doctoral students and has at least 75 academic descendants, including Volodymyr Mazorchuk and Vyacheslav Futorny.

Since 2022, Drozd has taught at Harvard University.

== Accomplishments ==
Drozd is recognized internationally for his fundamental contributions to algebra, particularly in the theory of finite-dimensional algebras and their representation types. Among his most significant achievements is the development of the "Drozd Dichotomy Theorem"—often called the tame-wild theorem—which proves that every finite-dimensional algebra over an algebraically closed field has either finite, tame, or wild representation type. This result, regarded as a milestone in modern representation theory, has shaped the direction of research and classification in the field.

In addition to his work on the dichotomy theorem, Drozd made important advances in the study of matrix problems—complex classification questions relating to modules over rings and representations of algebras. He developed and applied new techniques involving bocses (bimodules over a category endowed with a bialgebra structure) that enabled major progress in classifying modules across algebra, algebraic geometry, algebraic topology, and representation theory of Lie algebras. His research jointly with other mathematicians, such as Volodymyr Bondarenko, described all finite groups that have tame representation type over fields of positive characteristic.

Drozd's influence extends beyond foundational results in representation theory. He contributed to the theory of integral representations—giving criteria for when commutative or noncommutative orders have only finitely many indecomposable lattices and helping classify hereditary and Bass orders. Together with collaborators such as A. Roiter and V. Kirichenko, he established results that remain central to the theory of orders and modules.

In the 1980s and 1990s, Drozd and collaborators advanced the theory of Cohen–Macaulay modules over surface and curve singularities, notably proving that simple curve singularities possess only finitely many indecomposable Cohen–Macaulay modules. His joint work with G.-M. Greuel investigated the semi-continuity and trichotomy of representation types for curve singularities, which influenced later studies in singularity theory and algebraic geometry.

Drozd has also made substantial contributions to the representation theory of Lie algebras, including classification of bounded representations of the Lie algebra sl(2) over fields of positive characteristic, work on Gelfand-Zetlin modules, and Harish-Chandra subalgebras in collaboration with Vyacheslav Futorny and Sergey Ovsienko.

Drozd has authored numerous influential scholarly publications.
