= Swedish American Center =

The Swedish American Center, a national institute for migration studies and cultural exchange, was founded in 1960 when 100,000 Swedes emigrated to the United States. The Center serves as a continuation of the activities initiated by the Emigrantregistret/Kinship Center. The Swedish American Center is located in new premises at the Residence in central Karlstad.

== The Magazine ==
The Swedish American Center collaborates with The Swedish Council of America to release a quarterly magazine named Sweden & America. The magazine is published in both Swedish and English editions.
