= Volodymyr Mazorchuk =

Ukrainian-Swedish mathematician

Volodymyr Mazorchuk (born 1972) is a Ukrainian-Swedish mathematician at Uppsala University and was awarded the Göran Gustafsson Prize in 2016.

He received his PhD in mathematics from Taras Shevchenko National University of Kyiv in 1996 with advisor Yuriy Drozd.

== Selected publications ==
=== Articles ===
- König, Steffen; Mazorchuk, Volodymyr (2002). "Enright's completions and injectively copresented modules". Transactions of the American Mathematical Society. 354 (7): 2725–2743. doi:10.1090/S0002-9947-02-02958-6.
- Mazorchuk, Volodymyr; Stroppel, Catharina (2004). "Translation and shuffling of projectively presentable modules and a categorification of a parabolic Hecke module". Transactions of the American Mathematical Society. 357 (7): 2939–2973. doi:10.1090/S0002-9947-04-03650-5.
- Khovanov, Mikhail; Mazorchuk, Volodymyr; Stroppel, Catharina (2007). "A categorification of integral Specht modules" (PDF). Proceedings of the American Mathematical Society. 136 (4): 1163–1169. doi:10.1090/S0002-9939-07-09124-1. S2CID 7656634.
- Mazorchuk, Volodymyr; Ovsienko, Serge; Stroppel, Catharina (2008). "Quadratic duals, Koszul dual functors, and applications". Transactions of the American Mathematical Society. 361 (3): 1129–1172. arXiv:math/0603475. doi:10.1090/S0002-9947-08-04539-X. S2CID 779678.
- Ganyushkin, Olexandr; Mazorchuk, Volodymyr; Steinberg, Benjamin (2009). "On the irreducible representations of a finite semigroup". Proceedings of the American Mathematical Society. 137 (11): 3585. arXiv:0712.2076. doi:10.1090/S0002-9939-09-09857-8. S2CID 1805531.
- Mazorchuk, Volodymyr (2010). "Some homological properties of the category 𝒪, II". Representation Theory. 14 (6): 249–263. arXiv:0909.2729. doi:10.1090/S1088-4165-10-00368-7. S2CID 6089238.
- Mazorchuk, Volodymyr; Wiesner, Emilie (2014). "Simple Virasoro modules induced from codimension one subalgebras of the positive part". Proceedings of the American Mathematical Society. 142 (11): 3695–3703. arXiv:1209.1691. doi:10.1090/S0002-9939-2014-12098-3. S2CID 8112726.
- Futorny, Vyacheslav; Grantcharov, Dimitar; Mazorchuk, Volodymyr (2014). "Weight modules over infinite dimensional Weyl algebras". Proceedings of the American Mathematical Society. 142 (9): 3049–3057. arXiv:1207.5780. doi:10.1090/S0002-9939-2014-12071-5. S2CID 48992277.
- Mazorchuk, Volodymyr; Miemietz, Vanessa (2015). "Transitive $2$-representations of finitely $2$-categories" (PDF). Transactions of the American Mathematical Society. 368 (11): 7623–7644. doi:10.1090/tran/6583. S2CID 15404906.
- Kildetoft, Tobias; MacKaay, Marco; Mazorchuk, Volodymyr; Zimmermann, Jakob (2018). "Simple transitive $2$-representations of small quotients of Soergel bimodules". Transactions of the American Mathematical Society. 371 (8): 5551–5590. arXiv:1605.01373. doi:10.1090/tran/7456. S2CID 119314739.
- Chen, Chih-Whi; Mazorchuk, Volodymyr (2020). "Simple supermodules over Lie superalgebras". Transactions of the American Mathematical Society. 374 (2): 899–921. arXiv:1801.00654. doi:10.1090/tran/8303. S2CID 119307087.

=== Books ===
- Lectures on $\mathfrak{sl}_2 (\Complex)$-modules. World Scientific Publishing Company. 4 December 2009. ISBN 9781911299448.
- Lectures on Algebraic Categorification. European Mathematical Society. 2012. ISBN 9783037191088.
