= Kaj Nyström =

Swedish mathematician

Kaj Nyström is a Swedish mathematician currently at Uppsala University and was awarded the Göran Gustafsson Prize by the Royal Swedish Academy of Sciences.
