= Jane College =

Residential college of the University of Tasmania

- University of Tasmania
- Location: 6 Elboden Street, South Hobart, Tasmania, Australia
- Coordinates: 42°53′41.8″S 147°18′59.1″E
- Full name: The Jane Franklin Hall, residential college of the University of Tasmania
- Motto: "Veritas Liberabit" (Latin)
- Motto in English: "The truth will set you free"
- Established: 1950
- Named for: Jane Franklin
- Sister college: Burgmann College, Australian National University; St. John's College, University of Manitoba
- Principal: Joanna Rosewell, MJ
- Undergraduates: Max. 180
- Postgraduates: Max. 10
- Website: jane.edu.au

Jane College (formerly Jane Franklin Hall) in Hobart, Australia is an independent non-denominational residential college of the University of Tasmania. Familiarly referred to as "Jane", it was founded by the Tasmanian Council of Churches in 1950 as a residential college for women before becoming co-educational in 1973. Jane is a non-denominational Christian institution supported by chaplains of various Christian traditions and is the only college in the Oxbridge style attached to the university.

Although there is no direct link between them, the college is named in honour of Jane Franklin. The college formerly embraced Lady Franklin as a namesake, however, in 2025 rebranded to Jane College due to Lady Franklin's due treatment of Tasmanian Aboriginal people. In a media statement, the principal said that while Lady Jane Franklin made some notable contributions to Tasmanian society, her legacy is intertwined with the colonial era and its deep and lasting impacts on our First Nations peoples.

== History ==
Jane Franklin Hall was founded by the Tasmanian Council of Churches in 1950 as a non-denominational Christian College, and the first college for female students of the University of Tasmania. The College takes its name from Jane, Lady Franklin. She was a knowledgeable and enthusiastic patron of the arts and education. Her husband was arctic explorer John Franklin, who from 1837 to 1843 was the sixth Lieutenant-Governor of Van Diemen's Land. At a time when women were meant to stay in the domestic sphere Jane, Lady Franklin held lectures and evening parties with intellectual conversation. She invited and inspired local women, who she saw as 'living in seclusion', to acquire a love of reading and study. The college became co-educational in 1973. In August 2025, the college announced it would rebrand as Jane to distance itself from its namesake's colonial past.

== Principals ==
Period	Details
1950–1951	Miss T W Slayter
1952 (acting)	Miss M L O Horsfall
1953–1954	Miss R H Morrison
1955 (acting)	Dr M A Thynne
1956–1958	Miss M C Vines
1959–1962	Miss R A Fleming
1963–1970	Miss F A Parsons
1971–1973	Mrs H Webster
1974–1979	Dr M H Franklin
1980–1983	Dr M C Fearnley-Sander
1984–2002	Dr D C C Daintree
2003 (acting)	Mr S W Elliss
2003–2007	Dr J T Bowers
2007–2014	Mr M Scanlan
2014–2016	Prof G M Harrison
2016 –	Ms J B Rosewell

== Location ==
Jane Franklin Hall is situated in South Hobart, on one of Hobart’s many hills overlooking the city. Situated almost in the middle between the Sandy Bay and city campus, Jane is a 30 minute walk or short bus ride to all university sites.

== Campus ==
Aldridge – A 1970s style building covered in lush Virginia creeper, Aldridge is the first building off Elboden Street. It is named after a large home owned by the Allport family that used to grace its grounds. The College’s office is on the bottom floor of Aldridge, and the rest of the building is made up of student rooms.

Horton – The second building along the driveway, Horton houses approximately 40 residents, the Horton Common Room (known as “the H”), College laundry, weights room and a kitchen for weekend baking hobbies.

Asten – Asten is the home of the Kitchen and Dining Hall, Student Club Committee office and approximately 52 residents.

Barrett – Originally called ‘Clothea’, Barrett is a gracious 1880s Victorian home where the first students of Jane lived. It is named after a College founder, Archdeacon Barrett. The high vaulted ceilings and seven larger rooms are typically allocated by academic merit and community contribution. Barrett is home to the senior common room, Reflection Room and the link room, containing a full sized grand piano. It also houses the Collection of Medical Artefacts (COMA), an extensive collection of medical memorabilia, run as its own entity.

Vines – Built in the 1950s, Vines is the first dedicated College development of Jane Franklin Hall. Vines is named after former Principal Miss Kirsty Vines. It has its own 1950s quirks, most notably the shorter beds, installed when people were shorter and the College was all women. The college library and approximately 26 students are located in Vines, which is opposite the bus stop.

Fleming - A smaller area of the College, Fleming is named after former Principal, Miss Ruth Fleming. The wing is made up of seven rooms with ensuite bathrooms. On the top floor is the Coffee Lounge, converted from a former College laundry. It is used for quiet study or recreation.

Michael Webber House (Formerly) – Named after a respected, long serving member of the College Council, ‘Webber’ is one of the few Hobart houses built in the Arts and Crafts architectural style of the early 1900s. It contains the Edwin Pitman Common Room (known as the “Eddy P”) and ten large bedrooms. Webber is occupied by selected senior students who may prefer to self-cater. In 2025 it was sold off to a retired couple who would renovate it as low-rent accommodation for older women at risk of homelessness.

=== Other buildings ===
The Frances Parsons Building – The Frances Parsons Building hosts tutorials, play and band rehearsals, social functions and various other events. It is named in honour of founding student of the College, Ms Frances Parsons, who later became the first alumna appointed as Principal of the College. The building overlooks the tennis court and has views of Sandy Bay and the River Derwent.

The Lodge – Formerly the home of successive College Principals, the Lodge is a large, three story home now available a self catered option for selected senior students. It has views of Sandy Bay and the River Derwent.

The Fenton wing- Named in honour of Fellow of the College, Dr Karla Fenton OAM, this is the most recent addition to Jane, linking Horton and Aldridge. It features three self-contained apartments for post graduate students.

The Grounds – The grounds include maintained lawns and gardens. Pre-dinner drinks are served on the main lawn after the Commencement Ceremony. Backyard cricket is regularly played on the main lawn during the cricket season, and a barbecue is available for use.

== Academic support ==
All residents have access to an in-house academic support programme which provides subject tutorials in addition to those regular to a university course. Access to study facilities is provided throughout the semester and during the period just prior to and throughout the university examination period the college enters swot vac. This quiet time requires residents to be particularly mindful of their noise levels so that all residents are able to study.

== Student life ==
Upon entry to Jane, all residents become members of the Jane Franklin Hall Student Club. Residents can accept nomination to a position on the Student Club Committee and/or various sub-committees by election, and are then charged with representing students or organising activities.

=== Extra-curricular sports and activities ===
The following sports and activities are played between Jane Franklin Hall, Christ College and John Fisher College in an intercollege sports competition: Rugby, Tennis, Table Tennis, Volleyball, Softball, Cricket, Netball, Australian Rules football, Soccer, Basketball and Debating.

As well as the intercollege sports, the College holds annual theatrical productions, student art exhibitions, music soirees and competitions, and philosophy and religion discussion groups.

=== Food and meals ===
The college provides three meals a day, seven days a week, with an extra afternoon tea and supper provided each day of the SwotVac and exam periods.

Every second Monday of the semester, students don academic gowns for a three-course meal complete with candelabra and the wearing of College ties or brooches. The Principal hosts staff and special guests at the high table, grace is said - often in Latin - and a member of College acknowledges the traditional owners of the land, the Mouheneener people.

In 2018, the College resumed management of the kitchen, having engaged an external catering company for a number of years. The College now employs its own Catering Manager and staff.

=== Wellbeing at Jane ===
==== On campus ====
- Principal – is the CEO of the College, overseeing all aspects of College life including its strategic direction and culture.
- Dean of Students – oversees resident staff and assists the Principal with the management of residents’ welfare.
- Dean of Academic Studies - oversees academic support programs and staff.
- Advancement Manager - responsible for relationship-building and raising funds to benefit the College, including student scholarships and infrastructure.
- Senior Residents – a Senior Resident (SR) is a postgraduate or senior student available at all times that the Office is closed and is trained in various support skills including first aid, mental health, harassment and discrimination awareness, crisis management, conflict resolution and study skills.

==== Off campus ====
- Fellows – Fellows are members of the Jane community who are available to residents, particularly during College functions, and assist with mentoring and career guidance. There are approximately 40 Fellows representing most disciplines of the university.
- Chaplains – chaplains from the Anglican, Catholic and Uniting Churches are available to residents for confidential support and counselling on an opt-in, opt-out basis.

== Notable alumni ==
- George Bailey – Test cricketer, captain of Australian T20 team and member of Australian ODI team, Cricket Australia's Chief Selector for the men's program.
- David Bushby – Australian Consul-General in Chicago and former Chief Government Whip in the Senate
- Enid Campbell – Legal scholar, first female law professor and law school dean in Australasia
- Jonathon Duniam – Liberal Senator
- Marilyn Lake – Australian historian
- Denise Swan – former Liberal politician and Deputy Leader of the Opposition in Tasmania

== Notable fellows and visiting fellows ==
- David Arnason – Author
- Meurig Bowen – Musician and journalist
- Freda Briggs – Academic, author and child protection advocate
- Bob Brown – Politician, medical doctor, environmentalist and former Leader of the Australian Greens
- John Bryson – Author and lawyer
- Peter Coleman – Politician, former editor of The Bulletin and Quadrant
- Bryce Courtenay – Author
- John Dalgleish Donaldson – Mathematics academic and father of Queen Mary of Denmark
- Beverley Farmer – Author
- Iain Finlay – Author and journalist
- Bill Hayden – former Governor-General and Opposition Leader
- Tim Heald – Writer and journalist
- Shirley Jeffrey – Marine biochemist
- Janet Laurence – Author
- David Leaman – Structural geologist, geohydrologist and geophysicist
- Susan Moody – Writer
- Edwin James George Pitman – Mathematician
- Ngawang Samten – Philosopher and monk
- Roger Sandall – Essayist and academic
- Jan Sedivka – Violinist and former director of the Tasmanian Conservatorium of Music
- Gareth Sparham – Philosopher and monk
- Michael Tate – Catholic Vicar General of Tasmania, legal academic, diplomat and former Federal Minister for Justice
- Kate Warner – Former Governor of Tasmania and legal academic
- Joan Woodberry – Author and teacher
