= Sweet Haven =

Sweet Haven or Sweethaven may refer to:

- Sweet Haven, a fictional town, setting of the comic strip Popeye
- Popeye Village, or Sweethaven Village, a tourist attraction in Malta
- Sweet Haven, a novel by Lakambini Sitoy
- "Sweethaven", a 1980 song by Harry Nilsson from the Popeye film soundtrack
