= Sitoy =

Sitoy is a Cebuano surname. Notable people with the surname include:

- Adelino Sitoy (1936–2021), Filipino politician
- Lakambini Sitoy (born 1969), Filipino author
