= Vladimir Pimonov =

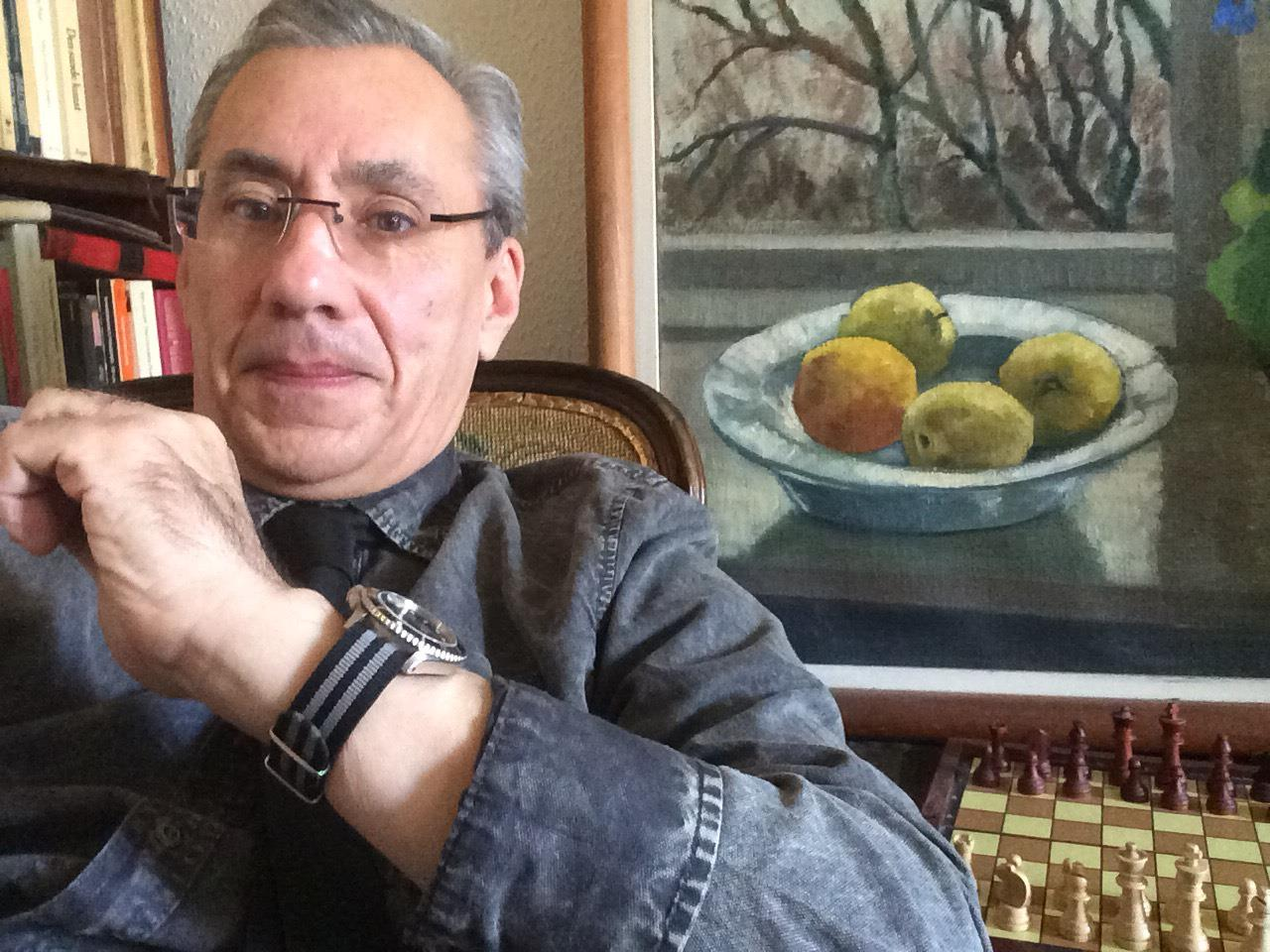
- Born: March 31, 1955 (age 71); Moscow, RSFSR, Soviet Union
- Citizenship: Denmark
- Education: Moscow State Linguistic University (B.A., M.A.); Moscow State Pedagogical University (Ph.D.); Birkbeck, University of London (Master's degree course)
- Occupations: Literary critic, journalist

Vladimir (Volodya, Volodja) Pimonov (Russian: Владимир (Володя) Иванович Пимонов, March 31, 1955, Moscow, USSR) is a Russian-born Danish journalist, author and literary scholar. As a journalist he is best known for his investigative reporting on the Soviet/Russian affairs. His literary research focuses on Shakespeare, classics, plot (narrative) theory and the concept of theatricality (metatheatre). His work is held in almost 100 major public and university library holdings around the world.

== Early life and education ==
Pimonov was born on March 31, 1955, in Moscow, USSR (Soviet Union). He graduated from Maurice Thorez Moscow State Institute of Foreign Languages (now Moscow State Linguistic University) and earned his Doctor of Philosophy degree (Ph.D in Philology) from Moscow State Pedagogical University. He finished Copenhagen Language School (Studieskolen) and completed a Master's degree course in macroeconomics at Birkbeck, University of London. He is a professor emeritus at the GITR Film and Television School in Moscow, Russia.

== Career ==
In the late 1970s and early 1980s in Moscow, alongside his academic work Pimonov was a writer for 64-Chess Review magazine (64 (magazine)). He left the Soviet Union in 1988 and settled in Denmark where he worked for a national daily newspaper Ekstra Bladet in Copenhagen for over two decades and also served as a Moscow correspondent. Pimonov was nominated for the Danish journalist award the Cavling Prize for a series of articles on the Soviet clandestine operations in Denmark during the Cold War and the Danish Association for Investigative Journalism Award (Foreningen for Undersøgende Journalistik) for exposing poor working conditions and willful violations of safety rules in the Russian coal mines in Siberia that supply coal to Denmark. He was awarded the Pushkin medal by the Academy of Russian Literature for his books about Russia. He published evidence of the Soviet Union's covert support for PFLP's (the second-largest of the groups forming the Palestine Liberation Organization) terrorist activities prior to Yasser Arafat's winning the Nobel Peace Prize, Moscow's illegal financing of the Communist Party of Denmark and revealed Ayman al-Zawahiri's (the co-founder of Al-Qaeda) activities in Denmark. Working with colleagues at Ekstra Bladet he published a series of investigative articles on connections (via British Virgin Islands' shell companies) between Icelandic banks, Kaupthing Bank in particular, and major Russian holdings with close ties to the Kremlin.<refname="xyz"/> During his career Pimonov reported on a broad range of issues, including military conflicts, terrorism and espionage.

== Activism ==
In the mid-1980s in Moscow Pimonov participated in human rights activities and campaigned for the release of political prisoners, freedom of movement and the right to leave the country for Soviet citizens. The authorities kept him under house arrest after he wrote an open letter to the Soviet leader Mikhail Gorbachev protesting against the Kremlin's use of violence to suppress a peaceful demonstration in Moscow for the release of Jewish political prisoners.

== Chess ==
Pimonov is a chess master and played in USSR Junior Championships and USSR quarter-final tournament. As a chess player and writer for the Soviet magazine 64-Chess review he appeared as one of the major characters in the 1988 book Searching for Bobby Fischer, by the American novelist Fred Waitzkin. Pimonov commented the World Chess Championship matches between Anatoly Karpov and Garry Kasparov for the Soviet and Western media.
