= Central Institute of Higher Tibetan Studies =

Deemed university in Varanasi, India

Coordinates: 25.36°N 83.02°E

Central University of Tibetan Studies
- ཝ་ཎ་མཐོ་སློབ
- Former names: Central Institute of Higher Tibetan Studies
- Established: 1967; 59 years ago
- Affiliations: ACU
- Chancellor: Union Minister of Culture
- Vice-Chancellor: Wangchuk Dorjee Negi
- Location: Sarnath, Varanasi, Uttar Pradesh, India
- Website: www.cihts.ac.in

The Central University for Tibetan Studies (CUTS), formerly called the Central Institute of Higher Tibetan Studies (CIHTS; Tibetan: ཝ་ཎ་མཐོ་སློབ, Wylie: wa Na mtho slob), is a Deemed University founded in Sarnath, Varanasi, India, in 1967. It is an autonomous university under India's Ministry of Culture. The CUTS was founded by Prime Minister Jawahar Lal Nehru and the 14th Dalai Lama Tenzin Gyatso with the aims of educating exiled Tibetan youths and other Himalayan border students, and re-translating original Indo-Buddhist Sanskrit texts, that in 1959 existed only in Tibetan, into Sanskrit, Hindi, and other modern Indian languages.

== Background ==
A 1951 agreement between Tibet and China was legally disavowed by Tibet in 1959, as the March 1959 Tibetan uprising in Lhasa commenced. The 14th Dalai Lama escaped to India and following him a wave of mass emigration to India was sparked as tens-of-thousands of Tibetans who feared persecution by China's People's Liberation Army. This significant Tibetan diaspora, under the shared governance of the Dalai Lama's Central Tibetan Administration and the Indian government under Nehru, sought to also maintain Tibet's culture and heritage. A foremost concern of the exiled population was the emigration of the younger generations from their historic homeland. Many feared exile implied marginalization, subsequently future prospects of reestablishing a Tibetan government in Tibet.

A conference was organized by the Dalai Lama wherein the spiritual leaders from the four schools of Tibetan Buddhism - Nyingma, Kagyu, Sakya, Gelug - discussed the preservation of Tibet's culture and the spiritual heritage of Tibet. Teaching that were carried out of Tibet were located and compiled to reconstitute the Tibetan canon. These efforts were undertaken to preserve and reviving Vajrayana Buddhist teachings within the exiled community in India.

The CIHTS was established in 1967 soon after the conference, and included departments from the four Tibetan traditions, a library, and a clinic. It was then an adjunct institution of Sampurnananda Sanskrit University, in Varanasi. After achieving full "Deemed as a University" status from the Indian Government, the institute moved north into Sarnath, and changed its name to Central University of Tibetan Studies (CUTS), while CIHTS remains in primary use.

== Early growth ==
The Central Institute of Higher Tibetan Studies was founded in 1967 in Sarnath, India, through a joint initiative by Indian Prime Minister Jawaharlal Nehru and the 14th Dalai Lama. Its establishment coincided with Tibet-Sikkim border skirmishes at Nathu La and Cho La, reigniting tensions between China's forces and India. The university was condemned by Beijing because it signaled further Indian support for Tibet and its government, the Central Tibetan Administration, that is hostile toward the concept of Chinese sovereignty over Tibet. According to the university's website, “the objective was to take care of the cultural and educational needs of the youth among the Tibetan diaspora in India, and those of the Himalayan regions of India, who earlier had the opportunity of being educated in Tibet, this came to be discontinued in the wake of the Chinese occupation.” The university attracts students from Tibetan exile communities around the world, including from India and especially the Himalayan regions.

The Government of India reviewed the institution's progress and decided to grant it status as an autonomous entity in 1977, and continued to offer “100% financial support” for the university. In 1988, the Indian government declared it “Deemed as a University,” status, officially recognizing it as an institution for higher education.

Today, the Central University of Tibetan Studies is considered to be one of the most premier Tibetan institutions of higher education, and a “center of research on Tibet, restoration of historical texts, and imparting knowledge of the four Sampradayas (schools) of Buddhism in Tibet.”

The CUTS was formerly headed by Kyabje Zong Rinpoche, Lobsang Tenzin the Samdong Rinpoche (also the former Prime Minister of the Central Tibetan Administration), and Ngawang Samten, who is a former alumni. In 2016, Lobsang Norbu Shastri became the institute's Vice Chancellor.

The university attracts students from many regions of the Himalayas, considered as family coming from Kinnaur, Lahaul, Spiti, Ladakh, Monpas from Arunachal. Students from Nepal include Sherpas, Lamas and many more from the bordering Tibetan regions of Mustang and Dolpo. Students also come from Bhutan and Mongolia.

The university also offers courses in Tibetan medicine (Sowa Rigpa), Tibetan Astrology, and Fine Arts.

Corresponding with the context in which it was founded, the university has always been highly interconnected with Tibetan politics. A clear example is the former head of the institute, Professor Venerable Samdhong Rinpoche, who headed the university until 2000 and later went on to assume the office of Prime Minister of the Tibetan Government in Exile. Another example is in 2020, following renewed and intense border skirmishes between Chinese and Indian troops along the Tibetan-Indian border and along the Indian border with Tibet, India added the study of Tibet to its military officers' training in classes now held at Central University of Tibetan Studies.

== University ==
On 14 January 2009 the institute was officially declared as a university and the inauguration was held by the 14th Dalai Lama. Now the name of the university is Central University of Tibetan Studies (CUTS).

== See also ==
- Central Institute of Buddhist Studies, in Leh in Ladakh in India.
- Gautam Buddha University, in Noida in Uttar Pradesh in India.
- Lumbini Buddhist University, in Lumbini in Nepal.
- Sanchi University of Buddhist-Indic Studies, in Sanchi in Madhya Pradesh in India.
- List of educational institutions in Varanasi
