= Susan Moody =

British writer (born 1940)

- Born: Susan Elizabeth Horwood; 18 January 1940 (age 86); Oxford, England
- Other names: Susannah James; Susan Madison (pen names)
- Occupation: Writer
- Spouses: Walter Bertsch (m. 1961; died 1971) John Moody (m. 1972, divorced) John Donaldson (m. 2001; died 2026)
- Children: 3

Susan Moody FCIL (born 18 January 1940), is the principal pen name of Susan Elizabeth Horwood, an English novelist best known for her suspense novels.

After marrying her third husband, professor John Dalgleish Donaldson, at Oxford on 5 September 2001, she became stepmother of his four children, including Queen Mary of Denmark. She lives in Hobart, Tasmania, Australia.

== Biography ==
The daughter of Professor Frederick Chesney Horwood (1904–1990) and Ursula née Wheeler-Robinson (1908–1989), daughter of the Revd Henry Wheeler-Robinson DD, she grew up in Oxford, attending Headington School. She then lived in France where she met her first husband, Professor Walter Frank Bertsch (died 1971), whom she married in 1961. They moved to Tennessee where she lived for 10 years and had two sons, before returning to Britain. She married secondly in 1972, Dr John Moody, having one son. She then studied with the Open University (BA 1978).

In 1983, Moody published her first novel, A Distant Shore, and one other historical novel under the pen name Susannah James before she turned to the genre of crime and suspense literature. More recently, she has also used the pen name Susan Madison.

Moody is a former Chairwoman of the Crime Writers' Association and has served as World President of the International Association of Crime Writers. She has been elected to the prestigious Detection Club and as a Fellow of the Chartered Institute of Linguists (FCIL). Having led numerous courses on writing crime fiction, she continues to tutor creative writing courses in England, France, Australia, and Denmark.

== Bibliography ==
Amateur detective Penny is a beautiful 6-ft black photographer, daughter of a UN Ambassador.

- Penny Black (1984) (#56 among The Top 100 Crime Novels of All Time)
- Penny Dreadful (1984)
- Penny Post (1985)
- Penny Royal (1986)
- Penny Wise (1988)
- Penny Pinching (1989)
- Penny Saving (1993).

=== Cassie Swann series ===
Cassie Swann is an expert bridge player in England.

- Takeout Double (Also published as: Death Takes a Hand) (1993)
- Grand Slam (1994)
- King of Hearts (1995)
- Doubled in Spades (1996)
- Sacrifice Bid (1997)
- Dummy Hand (1998).

=== Stand Alones ===
- Playing With Fire; (Mosaic, USA).
- Hush-a-bye
- House of Moons
- Misselthwaite : a sequel to Frances Hodgson Burnett's novel The Secret Garden; (Return to the Secret Garden, USA).
- Falling Angel
- The Italian Garden
- The Colour of Hope
- Touching The Sky
- Letters From Kirsten (Denmark)
- Losing Nicola
- Dancing in the Dark.

=== Other ===
- A Distant Shore, an historical novel set in the royal harem of Istanbul.
- Lucia's Legacy, an historical novel set in Spain in the 1800s.
- Love Over Gold, the novelisation of the Nescafé Gold Blend couple advertisements.
- Hatchards Crime Companion: The top 100 crime novels of all time selected by The Crime Writers Association, edited by Susan Moody.

=== Short stories ===
Moody has written a number of well-received short stories which have appeared in many anthologies.
