= Ngawang Samten =

Tibetan academic administrator

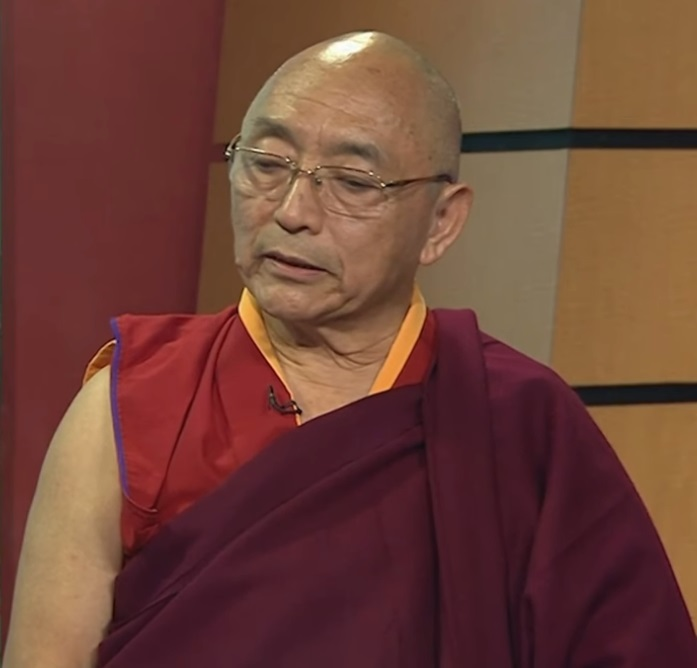
- Born: 7 July 1956 (age 69); Dokhar, Tibet
- Occupations: Educationist; Tibetologist
- Known for: Central University for Tibetan Studies
- Awards: Padma Shri

Ngawang Samten is a Tibetan educationist, Tibetologist and the vice chancellor of the Central University for Tibetan Studies. Besides editing publications such as Abhidhammathasamgaho, Pindikrita, Pancakrama and Manjusri, he is the co-translator of Je Tsongkhapa's commentary on Nagarjuna’s Mūlamadhyamakakārikā. The Government of India awarded him the fourth highest civilian honour of the Padma Shri, in 2009, for his contributions to Education.

== Biography ==
Ngawang Samten was born in the Central Tibetan town of Dokhar on 7 July 1956 but grew up in India since the age of three when his parents migrated to there in the wake of the 1959 Tibetan uprising. His early schooling was at Chandragiri, in Odisha, after which he did higher education at the Central Institute of Higher Tibetan Studies, (the present day Central University for Tibetan Studies CUTS), from where he passed the Shastri and Acharya grades. He also pursued his monastic education at Ganden Shartse Monastery, Mundgod, Karnataka, and secured the Geshe degrees of Dhorampa and Lharampa, the latter one, a doctoral degree equivalent to a PhD. He started his career as a research assistant at his alma mater, CUTS, and rose to the position of the head of the Research Department. During this period, he was involved in the translation of ancient Buddhist texts into Sanskrit. His post graduate research on the philosophy of Nagarjuna was later published by him as a critical edition of Ratnavali (Precious Garland), with his own commentary.

Later, Samten became the director of the Research and Publications Division of CUTS before being appointed as the vice chancellor of the institution. His efforts have been known to have assisted many universities in designing their curricula in Buddhist Studies and have helped in popularizing the topic in India. He has published three critical editions of Buddhist texts, Abhidhammattha-sangaha, Pindidrita and Pancakrama of Nagarjuna, all with his own commentary. His work, The Ocean of Reasoning, is an Oxford University Press-published English translation with annotations of the commentary of Mūlamadhyamakakārikā written by Je Tsongkhapa. He is a former member of the Editorial Board of the International Association of Tibetan Studies and has served as the visiting professor at the Hampshire College, Amherst College, Smith College and the University of Tasmania, besides travelling many places in India and abroad for delivering orations and participating in seminars, conferences and workshops on Tibetan Buddhism. He also serves as the Principal Teacher at Vajrayana Institute, New South Wales. In 2009, he received the civilian honour of the Padma Shri from the Government of India for his contributions to Education.

Ngawang Samten was invited along with Tsewang Tamdin and Tsering Thakchoe Drungtso for a hearing on July 21, 2010 by an Indian permanent parliamentary committee composed of thirty-two deputies and chaired by Amar Singh, playing a role in the recognition of Sowa Rigpa (Tibetan medicine) in India in conjunction with the Ministry of Ayush.

== See also ==
- Central University for Tibetan Studies
- Samten Karmay
