= Queen Mary of Denmark =

Queen of Denmark since 2024

Mary
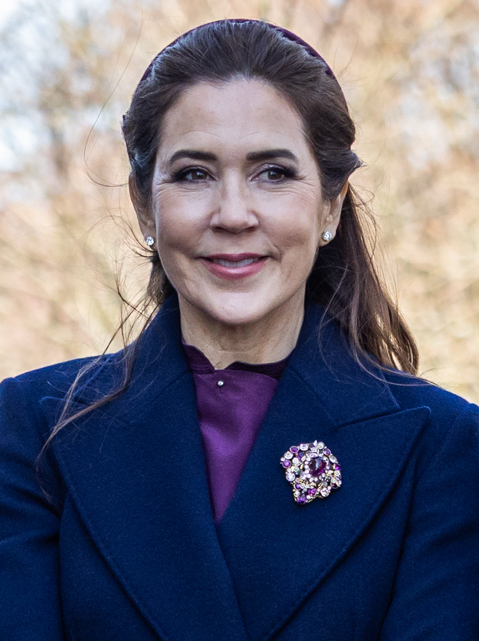
- Mary in 2025

Queen consort of Denmark
- Tenure: 14 January 2024 – present
- Born: Mary Elizabeth Donaldson; 5 February 1972 (age 54); Battery Point, Hobart, Tasmania, Australia
- Spouse: Frederik X (m. 2004)
- Issue: Crown Prince Christian; Princess Isabella; Prince Vincent; Princess Josephine
- Father: John Dalgleish Donaldson
- Mother: Henrietta Clark Horne

Mary (born Mary Elizabeth Donaldson; 5 February 1972) is Queen of Denmark as the wife of King Frederik X.

Mary met Frederik (then Crown Prince of Denmark) while attending the 2000 Summer Olympics in Sydney. They married on 14 May 2004 at Copenhagen Cathedral. They have four children: Christian, Isabella, Vincent and Josephine. Since her marriage, she has carried out engagements on behalf of the Danish monarchy, and she serves as patron of over 30 charitable organisations, including the United Nations Population Fund, the European regional office of the World Health Organization, the Danish Refugee Council and Julemærkefonden. She founded her social organisation, the Mary Foundation, in 2007.

In 2019, Mary was made a rigsforstander, which allows her to act as regent when the monarch is abroad. She became the first Australian-born queen consort of any country upon the abdication of her mother-in-law, Queen Margrethe II, on 14 January 2024. She has the additional title of Countess of Monpezat after her husband was given the title in 2008.

== Early life and education ==
Mary Elizabeth Donaldson was born 5 February 1972 at Queen Alexandra Hospital in Hobart, Tasmania, the youngest of four children of Scottish parents, Henrietta (née Horne) (1942–1997), an executive assistant to the vice-chancellor of the University of Tasmania, and John Dalgleish Donaldson (1941–2026), an academic and professor of mathematics who was also a member of Clan Donald. Her paternal grandfather was Captain Peter Donaldson (1911–1978). She was named after her grandmothers, Mary Dalgleish and Elizabeth Gibson Melrose, and was born and raised in Hobart. She has two older sisters, Jane Stephens and Patricia Bailey, and an older brother, John Stuart Donaldson. Her mother died from complications following heart surgery on 20 November 1997, when Mary was 25. In 2001, her father married the British author and novelist Susan Moody (née Horwood). He died in Hobart on 11 April 2026. During her childhood, Mary took part in a range of sports and extracurricular activities at school and elsewhere. She studied music, playing the piano, flute, and clarinet, and played basketball and hockey.

Mary began her schooling at Clear Lake City Elementary School in Houston, Texas, while her father, a professor of applied mathematics, was working at the Johnson Space Center. She then lived in Sandy Bay, Tasmania, from 1975 to 1977. Her primary education, from 1978 to 1983, was at Waimea Heights, followed by secondary schooling at Taroona High School from 1984 to 1987 and at Hobart College from 1988 to 1989. She studied at the University of Tasmania from 1990 to 1994, graduating with a combined Bachelor of Commerce and Bachelor of Laws degree on 27 May 1995. Between 1994 and 1996, she completed a graduate program and obtained certificates in advertising from the Advertising Federation of Australia and in direct marketing from the Australian Direct Marketing Association.

Her native language is English, and she studied French during her secondary education. In 2002, she briefly worked as an English tutor in Paris while dating Crown Prince Frederik. After moving to Denmark and before her marriage, she studied Danish as a foreign language at Studieskolen in Copenhagen in 2003.

== Career ==
Mary worked for Australian and international advertising agencies after graduating in 1995. She moved to Melbourne to begin her career in advertising, joining the Melbourne office of DDB Needham as a trainee in marketing and communications and later becoming an account executive. In 1996, she was employed by Mojo Partners as an account manager. In 1998, six months after her mother's death, she resigned and travelled to the United States and Europe. While in Edinburgh, she worked for three months as an account manager with Rapp Collins Worldwide, and in early 1999 she was appointed an account director with the international advertising agency Young & Rubicam in Sydney.

In June 2000, Mary moved to a smaller Australian agency, Love Branding, where she briefly served as its first account director. During the Australian spring of 2000, she became sales director and a member of the management team at Belle Property, a real‑estate firm. In the first half of 2002, she taught English at a business school in Paris. After moving to Denmark permanently, she worked for Microsoft Business Solutions near Copenhagen as a project consultant in business development, communications, and marketing from 5 September 2002 to 24 September 2003.

== Personal life ==
=== Courtship and engagement ===
Mary met Crown Prince Frederik of Denmark at the Slip Inn in Sydney during the 2000 Summer Olympics in Sydney. Frederik was at the bar with his brother, Prince Joachim, his cousin Prince Nikolaos of Greece and Denmark, Felipe, Prince of Asturias, and Princess Märtha Louise of Norway. Felipe knew Mary's flatmate. Frederik was not identified by Mary's friends as the Crown Prince of Denmark until after they met. They conducted a long-distance relationship, and Frederik made several discreet visits to Australia. On 15 November 2001, the Danish weekly magazine Billed Bladet named Mary as Frederik's girlfriend. She moved from Australia to Denmark in December 2001 while working as an English tutor in Paris.

On 24 September 2003, the Danish court announced that Queen Margrethe II intended to give her consent to the marriage at the State Council meeting scheduled for 8 October 2003. Frederik had presented Mary with an engagement ring set with an emerald-cut diamond and two emerald-cut ruby baguettes, the stones being similar in colour to those of the Dannebrog. The couple became officially engaged on 8 October 2003.

=== Marriage and children ===
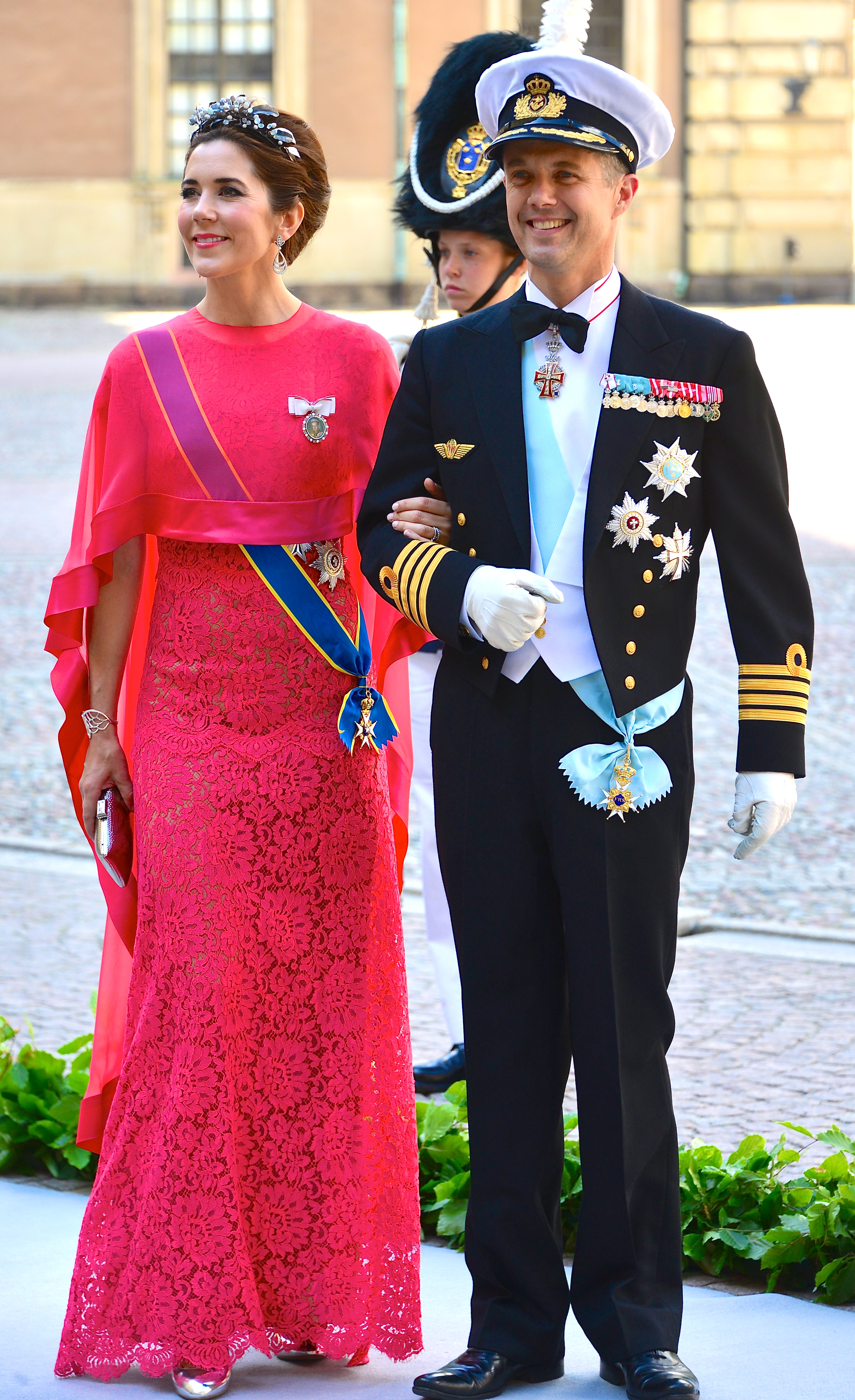
Mary and Frederik at the wedding of Princess Madeleine and Christopher O'Neill (Stockholm, June 2013)

Mary and Frederik married on 14 May 2004 in Copenhagen Cathedral. The couple reportedly spent their honeymoon in Africa.

The couple have four children:

- Crown Prince Christian Valdemar Henri John, born 15 October 2005 at Rigshospitalet in Copenhagen
- Princess Isabella Henrietta Ingrid Margrethe, born 21 April 2007 at Rigshospitalet
- Prince Vincent Frederik Minik Alexander, born 8 January 2011 at Rigshospitalet
- Princess Josephine Sophia Ivalo Mathilda, born 8 January 2011 at Rigshospitalet

The Danish Folketing passed a special law, known as Mary's Law, granting her Danish citizenship upon her marriage, a standard procedure for foreign-born members of the royal family. She had previously held dual Australian and British citizenship. Formerly a Presbyterian, she joined the Evangelical Lutheran Church of Denmark upon her marriage.

As a native English speaker, Mary made fluency in Danish a priority from the time of her engagement, and she acknowledged in interviews at the time that learning the language was a challenge.

Mary and her family reside at Frederik VIII's Palace, one of the four palaces that make up the Amalienborg Palace complex. Since May 2004 they have also used the Chancellery House, a building in the grounds of Fredensborg Palace, during the summer months.

Mary is a keen equestrian and has competed in several dressage events.

She is the godmother of Princess Estelle of Sweden, who was also given the secondary name Mary in her honour, and of her nephew, Count Henrik of Monpezat (then Prince Henrik of Denmark).

== Queen consort ==
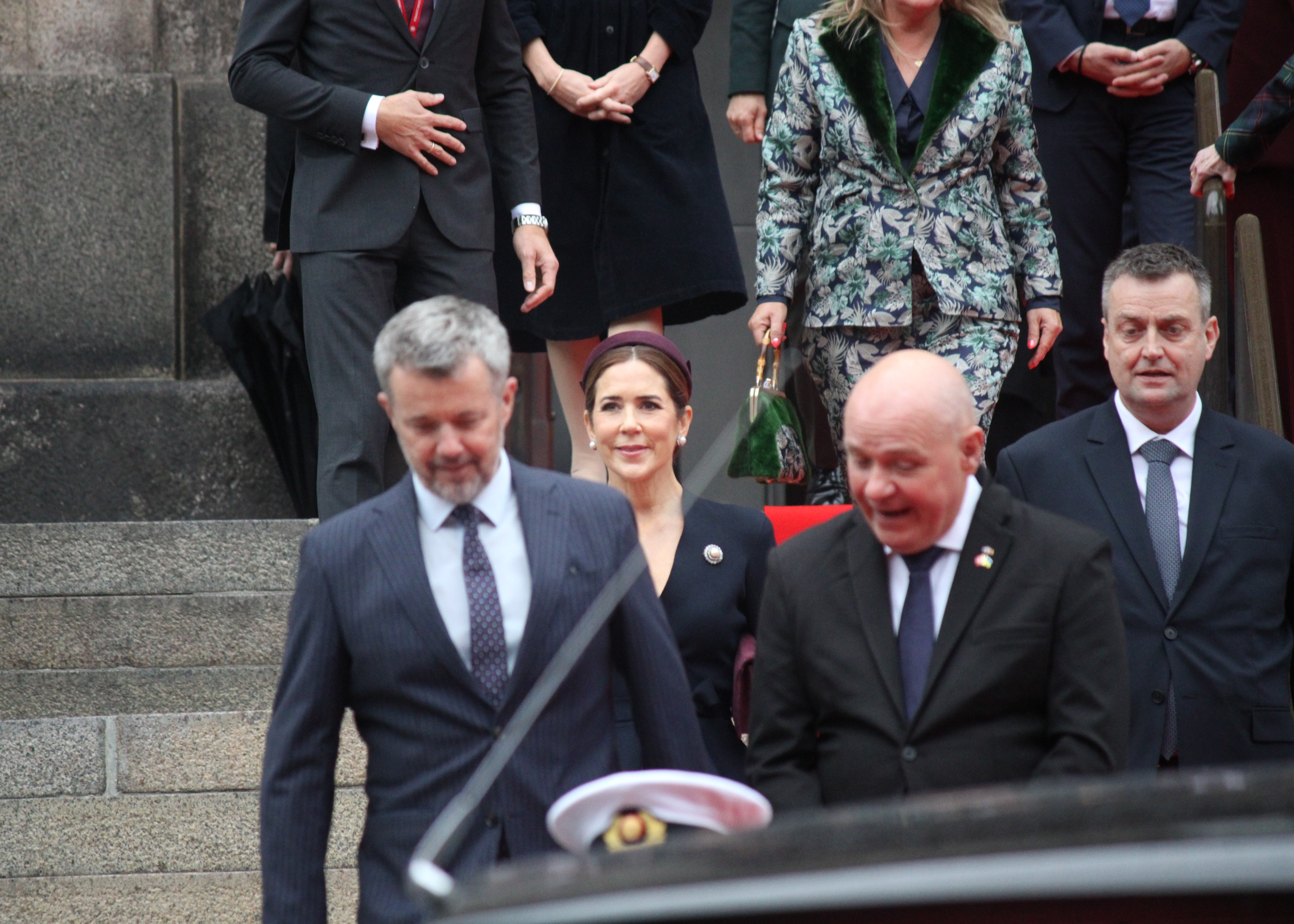
Mary leaving Christiansborg with her husband after the 2025 opening of parliament

Mary became Queen of Denmark, making her the first Australian‑born queen consort of any country, upon the abdication of Queen Margrethe II and the accession of her husband as King Frederik X on 14 January 2024. After he was proclaimed king from the balcony of Christiansborg Palace, Mary joined him on the balcony to greet the crowds. On 15 January, the royal family attended a ceremony at the Folketing to mark the change of monarch, and on 21 January, they attended a service at Aarhus Cathedral.

The King and Queen made their first state visits from 6–7 and 14–15 May 2024, when they visited Sweden and Norway. In June, they toured Greenland, one of the autonomous territories of the Kingdom of Denmark. In June 2025, they toured the other territory, the Faroe Islands.

== Public life, charities and patronages ==
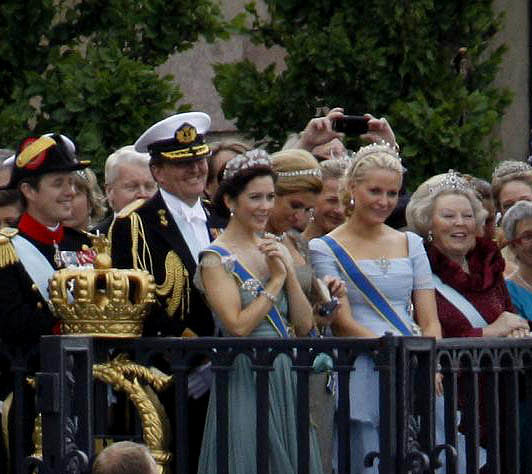
Mary attends the wedding of Crown Princess Victoria of Sweden in 2010. She is pictured here surrounded by (left to right): Frederik; Willem-Alexander of the Netherlands; Máxima of the Netherlands; Mette-Marit of Norway; and Beatrix of the Netherlands.

Following the wedding, the Crown Prince couple embarked upon a summer working-tour of mainland Denmark aboard the royal yacht Dannebrog, then travelled to Greenland and the 2004 Athens Olympics. In 2005, during the celebrations for the 200th anniversary of Hans Christian Andersen, the royal family was involved in related events throughout the year. Mary and Frederik marked the anniversary in London, New York, and in Australia, where she was made Honorary Hans Christian Andersen Ambassador to Australia in the Utzon Room of the Sydney Opera House.

After becoming Crown Princess, Mary made a number of international visits, and Frederik and Mary participated in the reburial ceremonies for Empress Maria Feodorovna in Denmark and Saint Petersburg in 2005. In November 2009, Mary made a surprise visit to Danish soldiers in Helmand Province, Afghanistan. One of her stops was FOB Armadillo.

During a Council of State on 2 October 2019, the Queen's request to appoint Mary a rigsforstander, a functioning regent when the monarch or the heir is out of the country, was approved by the government. After having sworn to respect the Danish constitution, she became the first person not born into the royal family to assume the position of rigsforstander since Queen Ingrid in 1972.

Mary was voted Woman of the Year 2008 by the Danish magazine Alt for damerne, donating her cash reward to charity. She was interviewed by Parade Magazine (US), on television programs of Andrew Denton (Australia), and by USA Today (US).

She serves on the board of directors of The Royal Danish Collection.

=== Patronages and interests ===
Since 2004, Mary has steadily worked to establish her relationships with various organisations, their issues, missions, programmes and staff. Her patronages range across areas of culture, the fashion industry, humanitarian aid, support for research and science, social and health patronages and sport. The organisations of which she is patron have reported positive outcomes through their relationships with her and there are various reports in the Danish media and on some of the organisations' websites about her being quite involved in her working relationship with them. She is currently involved in supporting anti-obesity programs through the World Health Organization, Regional Office for Europe.

In the context of immigrant issues in Denmark, Mary has visited the disadvantaged migrant areas of Vollsmose (2006), Gellerup (2007), and Viborg (2010), and has participated in integration projects including the teaching of the Danish language to refugees. As patron of the Danish Refugee Council, Mary visited Uganda (2008) and East Africa (2011) and supports fundraising for the region.

Mary has played an active role in promoting an anti-bullying program based on an Australian model through the auspices of Denmark's Save the Children. She is also involved in a campaign to raise awareness and safe practices among Danes about skin cancer through The Danish Cancer Society.

Mary is also an Honorary Life Governor of the Victor Chang Cardiac Research Institute based at the Garvan Institute/St Vincent's Hospital, Sydney, a member of the International Committee of Women Leaders for Mental Health and a member of various sporting clubs (riding, golf and yachting). In June 2010, it was announced that Mary had become Patron of UNFPA, the United Nations Population Fund, "to support the agency's work to promote maternal health and safer motherhood in more than 150 developing nations". Mary lends her support to a number of other "one-off" Danish causes, industry events, and international conferences. In 2011, the Westmead Cancer Centre at Westmead Hospital in Sydney was renamed the Crown Princess Mary Cancer Care Centre Westmead.

Mary is an active patron of Denmark's third-highest-earning export industry, the fashion industry, and is Patron of the Copenhagen Fashion Summit.

=== The Mary Foundation ===
On 11 September 2007, Mary announced the establishment of the Mary Fonden at an inaugural meeting at Amalienborg Palace. The foundation's aim is to improve lives compromised by environment, heredity, illness, or other circumstances that can isolate or exclude people socially. The initial funds of DKK 1.1 million were collected in Denmark and Greenland and donated to Frederik and Mary as a wedding gift in 2004. Mary is chairwoman of eight trusts. In 2014, she received a Bambi Award for her work with the foundation.

=== LGBT rights ===
In 2016, on the International Day Against Homophobia and Transphobia, Mary gave a speech on LGBT rights at a forum in Copenhagen hosted by the Danish government. She called for an end to discrimination, oppression, and violence against people on the basis of sexual orientation and gender identity. In January 2018, Mary delivered her speech on LGBTQ+ equality at the Parliamentary Assembly of the Council of Europe. On 25 April 2018, she was invited to present the honorary award to LGBT Danmark at the Danish Rainbow Awards – AXGIL 2018. She thus became the first member of the royal family to attend the Danish Rainbow Awards. She also attended the awards ceremony in 2019 and 2020. In 2020, Mary spoke at Copenhagen Pride's virtual pride festival.

In October 2019, it was announced that Mary would serve as patron of WorldPride Copenhagen 2021, making her the first ever royal to serve as patron for a major LGBT event. She carried out numerous engagements in connection with the event and also gave the closing speech of the week-long celebrations on 21 August 2021.

== Public image and style ==
Mary has been named one of the world's most fashionable people in Vanity Fair's annual International Best-Dressed List and has posed and given interviews for magazines including Vogue Australia (where she used pieces of foreign designers, such as Hugo Boss, Prada, Louis Vuitton or Gaultier, and Danish designers, like Malene Birger and Georg Jensen), Dansk (Danish Magazine, dedicated to Danish fashion) and German Vogue (where she was photographed between pieces of Danish modern art in Amalienborg Palace). Mary also posed for other magazines during her life as a royal, such as The Australian Women's Weekly (to which she spoke on several occasions about her life as a royal and her family), and Parade.

In 2010 her elegance was praised by designer Tommy Hilfiger, who remarked "I've seen pictures of her and she dresses really well. Mary has a very sophisticated, European style that is also worthy of a princess".

=== 50th birthday celebrations ===
Numerous official events were planned for the week of Mary's 50th birthday on 5 February 2022. Several of these, including a gala dinner at Rosenborg Castle, were cancelled due to the ongoing COVID-19 pandemic, but several hundred Danes showed up at Amalienborg's courtyard at noon on Mary's birthday. Rather than stepping out onto Frederik VIII's Palace's balcony as is customary for birthday celebrations in the Danish royal family, Mary and her three oldest children came out onto the courtyard to thank the people who had shown up. The day after her birthday, the Crown Prince family attended a televised concert held in her honour named Mary 50 – we’re celebrating Denmark's Crown Princess hosted by TV2.

For Mary's 50th birthday, several places in Denmark were named in her honour: The University of Copenhagen created a knowledge centre named the Crown Princess Mary Centre in which Mary will be part of the Advisory Committee; Rigshospitalet, the Copenhagen University Hospital, named their new department for children, teenagers, expecting mothers and their families Mary Elizabeth's Hospital in honour of Mary's extensive work with the well-being of children and youths, maternal health and the hospital's network for children with cancer; and Copenhagen Zoo named the Australia-themed section of their garden Mary's Australian Garden.

== Titles, styles, honours and arms ==
=== Titles and styles ===
Upon marriage to Frederik on 14 May 2004, Mary assumed the title "Her Royal Highness The Crown Princess of Denmark". When Margrethe II created the title Count of Monpezat for her male-line descendants on 29 April 2008, Mary became known as "Her Royal Highness The Crown Princess of Denmark, Countess of Monpezat". Since the accession of her husband, Mary has been styled "Her Majesty The Queen, Countess of Monpezat". She is known simply as "Her Majesty The Queen" on a daily basis.

=== Military ranks ===
Danish Home Guard

- (Denmark) 24 January 2008: Officer cadet
- (Denmark) 1 March 2009: Sergeant
- (Denmark) 20 February 2009: Lieutenant
- (Denmark) 18 September 2015: First Lieutenant
- (Denmark) 31 March 2019: Captain
- (Denmark) 4 May 2023: Honorary Major

=== Honours ===
==== National honours ====
===== Orders and appointments =====
- Knight of Order of the Elephant (9 May 2004)
- Grand Commander of the Order of the Dannebrog (26 May 2024) (S.Kmd.)

===== Medals and decorations =====
- Denmark:
  - Dame of the Royal Family Decoration of Queen Margrethe II (9 May 2004)
  - Dame of the Royal Family Decoration of King Frederik X (14 January 2024)
  - Recipient of the Homeguard Medal of Merit (1 April 2008)
  - Recipient of the 75th Birthday Medal of Prince Henrik (11 June 2009)
  - Recipient of the 350th Anniversary Medal of the Royal Danish Life Guards (10 June 2008)
  - Recipient of the 70th Birthday Medal of Queen Margrethe II(16 April 2010)
  - Recipient of the Ruby Jubilee Medal of Queen Margrethe II (14 January 2012)
  - Recipient of the 75th Birthday Medal of Queen Margrethe II
  - Recipient of the Golden Anniversary Medal of Queen Margrethe II and Prince Henrik
  - Recipient of Prince Henrik's Commemorative Medal
  - Recipient of the 80th Birthday Medal of Queen Margrethe II
  - Recipient of the Golden Jubilee Medal of Queen Margrethe II
  - Recipient of the Reserve Officers' Association in Denmark's Badge of Honor
- Greenland: Recipient of the Nersornaat Medal for Meritorious Service in Gold

==== Foreign honours ====
- Belgium: Grand Cross of the Order of the Crown
- Brazil: Grand Cross of the National Order of the Southern Cross
- Bulgaria: Grand Officer of the Order of the Balkan Mountains
- Egypt: Grand Cross of the Order of Virtues
- Estonia: Grand Cross of the Order of the Cross of Terra Mariana
- Finland: Grand Cross of the Order of the White Rose of Finland
- France:
  - Grand Cross of the Order of the Legion of Honour
  - Grand Cross of the Order of National Merit
- Greece: Grand Cross of the Order of Beneficence
- Iceland: Grand Cross of the Order of the Falcon
- Latvia: Commander Grand Cross of the Order of the Three Stars
- Lithuania: Grand Cross of the Order of Vytautas the Great (28 January 2026)
- Mexico: Grand Cross of the Mexican Order of the Aztec Eagle
- Netherlands:
  - Dame Grand Cross of the Order of the Lion of the Netherlands
  - Recipient of the King Willem-Alexander Inauguration Medal
- Norway: Dame Grand Cross of the Order of Saint Olav
- Spain: Dame Grand Cross of the Royal Order of Isabella the Catholic
- Sweden:
  - Knight of the Royal Order of the Seraphim (6 May 2024)
  - Commander Grand Cross of the Royal Order of the Polar Star
  - Recipient of the 70th Birthday Medal of King Carl XVI Gustaf
  - Recipient of the King Carl XVI Gustaf Golden Jubilee Medal

=== Honorific eponyms ===
==== Structures ====
- Australia: Crown Princess Mary Cancer Care Centre Westmead, Westmead Hospital, Sydney (2011)
- Denmark: Crown Princess Mary's Bridge, Roskilde Fjord (2019)
- Denmark: Mary's Australian Garden, Copenhagen Zoo, Copenhagen (2022)
- Denmark: The Crown Princess Mary Centre, University of Copenhagen, Copenhagen (2022)
- Denmark: Mary Elizabeth's Hospital, Rigshospitalet, Copenhagen (2026)

=== Arms ===
Coat of arms of Queen Mary of Denmark

With the marriage in 2004, Queen Mary was invested with the Order of the Elephant, and her father John Dalgleish Donaldson with the Order of the Dannebrog. In accordance with the statutes of the Danish Royal Orders, both Mary and her father were granted personal coats of arms, displayed on a stall plate in the Chapel of the Royal Orders at Frederiksborg Castle. The main field of Mary's coat of arms is Or-coloured and shows a MacDonald Gules eagle and a Sable-coloured boat both symbolising her Scottish ancestry. The Chief is Azure-coloured and shows two gold Commonwealth Stars from the arms of Australia, and a gold rose in between, depicting her personal symbol. The shield is surmounted by the Royal Crown of Denmark, and surrounded by the Collar of the Order of the Elephant.

The coat of arms of her father, Professor John Donaldson, is almost identical to that of the Queen, but a gold infinity symbol symbolises his career as an Australian mathematician, instead of her gold Rose. Above his shield is instead placed a barred helmet topped with a gules rampant lion, which is turned outward. The lion is derived from the arms of Scotland and also from the arms of Tasmania and Hobart. Both armorial bearings were granted in 2006 and installed in the Chapel of the Royal Orders in 2007.

Royal monogram

Joint monogram of Frederik and Mary

Danish royalty
Vacant Title last held by Henri de Laborde de Monpezat as prince consort	Queen consort of Denmark; 2024–present	Incumbent
