= Lakambini Sitoy =

Lakambini A. Sitoy (born 1969) is a Filipino author, journalist and teacher. Her novel Sweet Haven was published in French translation by Albin Michel as Les filles de Sweethaven in October 2011, in the original English by the New York Review of Books in 2014, and by Anvil Publishing Inc. in 2015. She received the David T.K. Wong fellowship from the University of East Anglia, Norwich, United Kingdom, in 2003.

== Biography ==
She was born in the Philippines in 1969, and earned a degree in Biology from Silliman University. She has an MA from Roskilde University, Denmark, in the fields of English Studies and Cultural Encounters, both under the Department of Culture and Identity.

== Career ==
As a journalist, Sitoy was a lifestyle and cultural section editor for various papers, and was a columnist and section editor for the Manila Times. She has also received nine prizes in the annual Don Carlos Palanca Memorial Awards in the Philippines (1995, 1996, 1998, 2000 (2), 2001, 2005 (2), 2007 as well as a Philippines Free Press Award (1994).

She currently teaches English at Studieskolen in Copenhagen, Denmark.

== Works ==
Sitoy has published a novel, Sweet Haven (Anvil, 2015) and two collections of short stories in Manila. Mens Rea and Other Stories was published by Anvil in 1999 and received a Manila Critics' Circle National Book Award that same year. Jungle Planet was published by the University of the Philippines Press in 2006 and was shortlisted for the Manila Critics' Circle National Book Award for that year. Sitoy was among 21 authors on the Man Asian Literary Prize's long list in 2008. The novel Sweet Haven was her first, and it was published in French by Albin Michel in October 2011.

Her short stories have appeared in magazines such as Philippines Free Press, Philippine Graphic and Story Philippines. They have appeared in various anthologies in the Philippines, such as Likhaan Anthology of Poetry and Fiction (published by the University of the Philippines Press) and The Best Philippine Stories, a 2000 anthology published by Tahanan Books and edited by Isagani Cruz. Other stories have appeared in Manoa, the literary journal of the University of Hawaii; Wake, an anthology of stories, essays and poems about Southeast Asia published in Britain to benefit victims of the 2004 tsunami; and Ansigter, an anthology of Southeast Asian short stories published by Forlaget Hjulet in Copenhagen in 2008.

Sitoy has received writing fellowships from the National Writers' Workshop in Dumaguete (1989) and the University of the Philippines National Writers Workshop (1990). She has also received nine prizes in the annual Don Carlos Palanca Memorial Awards and a Philippines Free Press Award (1994). She currently resides in Denmark.
