= John Dalgleish Donaldson =

Scottish-Australian academic (1941–2026)

John Dalgleish Donaldson S.K.
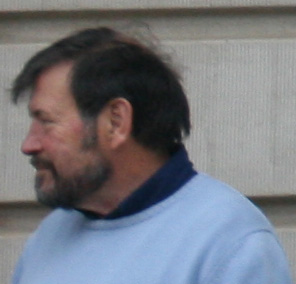
- Donaldson in 2009
- Born: 5 September 1941; Cockenzie and Port Seton, Scotland
- Died: 11 April 2026 (aged 84); Hobart, Tasmania, Australia
- Education: University of Edinburgh (BSc); University of Tasmania (PhD)
- Spouses: Henrietta Clark Horne (m. 1963; died 1997) Susan Elizabeth Horwood (m. 2001)
- Children: 4, including Mary, Queen of Denmark
- Scientific career
- Fields: Applied mathematics
- Workplaces: UTAS; KAIST
- Thesis: Asymptotic estimates of the errors in the numerical integration of analytic functions (1967)
- Doctoral advisor: David Elliott

John Dalgleish Donaldson S.K. (5 September 1941 – 11 April 2026) was a Scottish-Australian academic and father of Queen Mary of Denmark, the wife of King Frederik X of Denmark.

== Background ==
John Dalgleish Donaldson was born on 5 September 1941 in Cockenzie and Port Seton, East Lothian, Scotland, the son of Captain Peter Donaldson and his wife, Mary Dalgleish. Captain Donaldson had sailed regularly from Port Seton Harbour, then in 1962 it is recorded the vessel Shearwater navigating the Bass Strait Islands with a cargo of livestock under his command was lost off Ninth Island. He and his crew were saved and there are still remains of the ship on the island today.

On 31 August 1963, Donaldson married his first wife, Henrietta Clark Horne (1942–1997), at Port Seton. They emigrated to Tasmania, Australia, in November of that year. Donaldson's parents, his elder brother and younger sister also emigrated to Tasmania. His father then joined a large maritime trading company as a captain. They had four children, including Mary Elizabeth Donaldson, who married King Frederik X (then Crown Prince Frederik) in 2004.

In addition to British citizenship, Donaldson obtained Australian citizenship in 1975.

Henrietta died on 20 November 1997, and Donaldson later married Susan Elizabeth Horwood (born 1940) on 5 September 2001. She is a novelist who writes under the names Susan Moody, Susannah James and Susan Madison.

Donaldson died in Hobart on 11 April 2026, aged 84.

== Education ==
In 1963, Donaldson graduated from the University of Edinburgh with a BSc degree with honours in Mathematics and Physics. After Edinburgh, Donaldson moved to Australia to work under the direction of mathematician Professor David Elliott at the University of Tasmania, taking a PhD in Mathematics in 1967.

== Career ==
After receiving his doctorate in 1967, Donaldson remained at the University of Tasmania as a lecturer in applied mathematics, becoming Dean of UTAS Faculty of Science until retiring in 2003. He specialised in numerical analysis and has an Erdős number of 3.

With the Earl of Dunmore, Donaldson served on the Scottish Australian Heritage Council.

Professor of Applied Mathematics at the Korea Advanced Institute of Science and Technology (KAIST), Donaldson was previously a Visiting Professor at several universities in Houston, Montreal, then Oxford, from 2004 at Aarhus University and from 2006 also at the University of Copenhagen.

A keen rugby player and a member of the University Associates Rugby Union Club, Donaldson is renowned as having captained the first Tasmanian State Rugby Team to play against a touring New Zealand All Blacks team, at Queenborough Oval, Hobart, on 25 May 1968, which the All Blacks won 74–0.

== Honours, title and coat of arms ==
- PhD (UTAS), doctorate received by Dr J. D. Donaldson, 1968
- (Denmark) Grand Cross of the Order of the Dannebrog, 2004

Upon the marriage of his daughter to the then Crown Prince Frederik in 2004, Donaldson was appointed to the Order of the Dannebrog. In accordance with the statutes of the Danish Royal Orders, both he and his daughter were granted arms to display in the Chapel of the Royal Orders at Frederiksborg Castle.

Coat of arms of John Dalgleish Donaldson
| Notes Queen Mary's coat of arms is almost identical to that of her father's, but a gold rose is depicted as her personal symbol, instead of the infinity symbol. Granted 2004 Orders Grand Cross of the Order of the Dannebrog Symbolism The main field of Professor Donaldson's coat of arms is tinctured Or and shows a MacDonald Gules eagle and a Sable boat both symbolising his Scottish ancestry. The Chief field is Azure and shows two gold Commonwealth Stars from the arms of Australia, and a gold infinity symbol in between, symbolising his career in Australia as a mathematician. Above the shield is placed a barred helmet topped with a red rampant lion, which is turned outward. The lion derives from the arms of Scotland and also from the arms of Tasmania and Hobart. Other versions With the Order of the Dannebrog |

== Publications ==
- Chick, H.L.; Collis, K.F.; Donaldson, J.D.; Watson, J.M. (1995). Professional development in mathematics for teachers: Who, what, why and how. 15th Biennial Conference of the Australian Association of Mathematics Teachers. Darwin. pp. 65–71. S2CID 180618518.
- Donaldson, John D.; Jezewski, Donald J. (1977). "An element formulation for perturbed motion about the center of mass". Celestial Mechanics and Dynamical Astronomy. 16 (3): 367–387. Bibcode:1977CeMec..16..367D. doi:10.1007/BF01232661. S2CID 123349501.
- Roberts, Michael S.; Donaldson, John D.; Rowland, Malcolm (1988). "Models of hepatic elimination: Comparison of stochastic models to describe residence time distributions and to predict the influence of drug distribution, enzyme heterogeneity, and systemic recycling on hepatic elimination". Journal of Pharmacokinetics and Pharmacodynamics. 16 (1): 41–83. doi:10.1007/BF01061862. PMID 3373419. S2CID 360960.
- Wotherspoon, S.J.; Donaldson, J.D. (1996). "Finite differences and internal tides-representing the boundary". Deep-Sea Research Part I. 43 (6): 949–958. Bibcode:1996DSRI...43..949W. doi:10.1016/0967-0637(96)00029-5. ISSN 0967-0637.
- Donaldson, John D.; Rahman, Qazi Ibadur (1972). "Inequalities for polynomials with a prescribed zero". Pacific Journal of Mathematics. 41 (2): 375–378. doi:10.2140/pjm.1972.41.375.

== Sources ==
- Genealogisches Handbuch des Adels, Fürstliche Häuser, Reference: 2004 11
- The Ancestry of Mary Elizabeth Donaldson 2006, Reitwiesner, William Addams, Reference: nr.2
