= Studieskolen =

Coordinates: 55.6826°N 12.5845°E

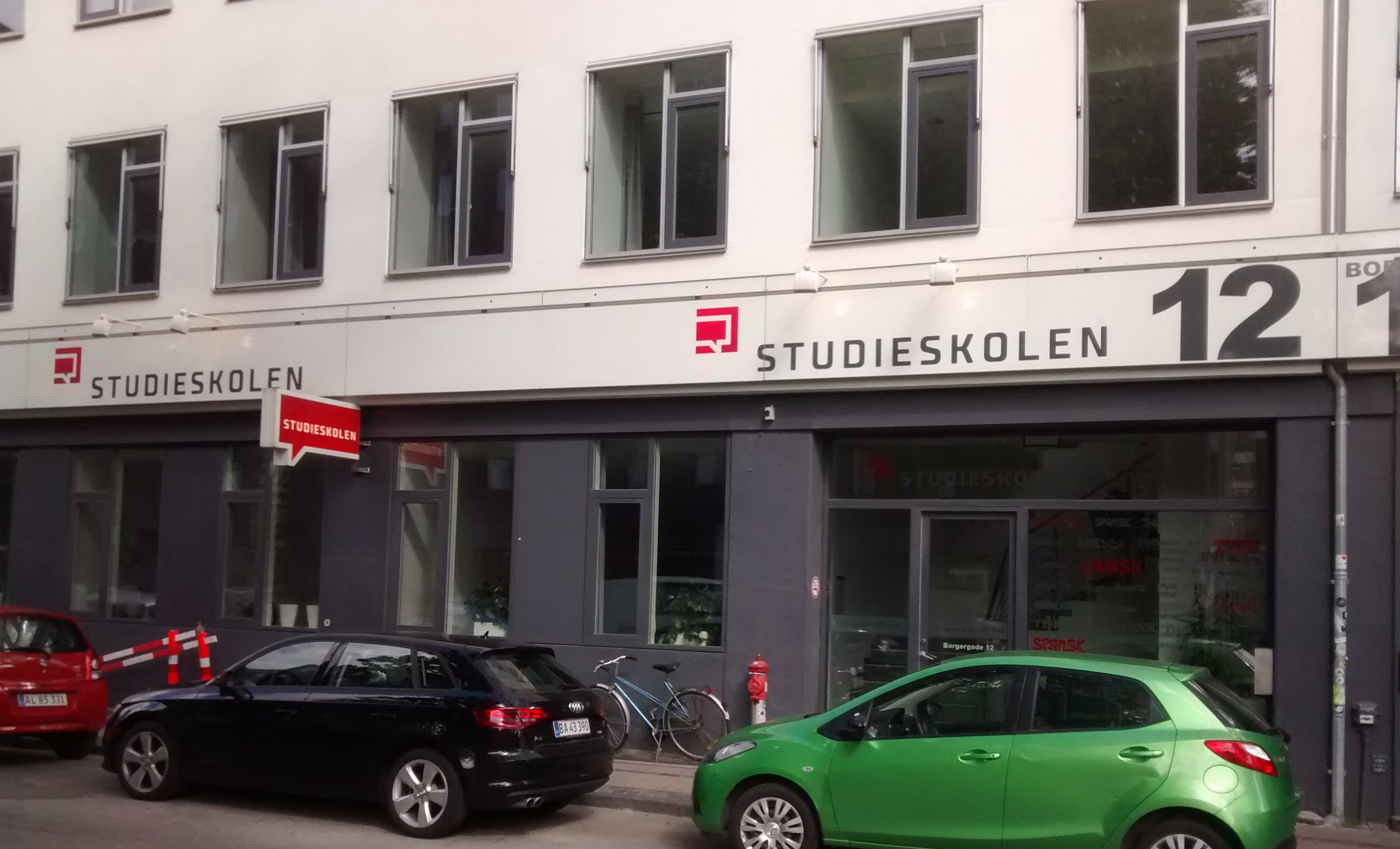

Location
- Copenhagen, Denmark

Information
- Website: studieskolen.dk

Studieskolen is a language school in Copenhagen, Denmark. The school has been teaching languages to adults under the name Studieskolen since 1977. Studieskolen provides courses in Danish as well as in 30 other languages, with courses starting all year round.
Studieskolen is a private association whose mission is to improve the language skills of Danes and foreigners in Denmark. Its classes take place at its location in the city centre of Copenhagen.

== Courses ==
Studieskolen is organized in several departments:

Foreign Languages
Studieskolen's foreign language department offers classes in more than 20 languages, including: Arabic, Croatian, Danish, Dutch, English, French, German, Greek, Hebrew, Italian, Japanese, Mandarin, Persian, Polish, Portuguese, Russian, Serbian, Spanish, Swedish, and Turkish.

Danish for Foreigners
Studieskolen's Danish Language Centre teaches Danish for Foreigners under contract with the Municipality of Copenhagen. The courses cover six modules of Danish education. Module 6 is required for admission to higher education. Studieskolen provides a wide range of Danish courses starting every three weeks at all levels, as well as courses for Swedish and Norwegian-speaking students and courses for health care professionals.

Business Languages
The Business Department offers language courses for the Business Community and one-to-one courses in all languages, including Danish.

FVU
Studieskolen offers free FVU-classes in Danish, English and mathematics.

le:v:el
le:v:el is a knowledge centre which provides teacher training by using tested methods and tools. le:v:el is involved in cutting-edge international projects to develop new language teaching methods and specialises in language testing, language coaching and textbook systems.

Test Centre
Studieskolen's test centre arranges Danish tests and exams and English exams, in particular, such as Cambridge English and TOEFL.

Sprogstøtte
Language support for SOSU students.

== Notable alumni ==
- Mary, Queen of Denmark, the Danish Queen Consort, learned Danish here.
- Vladimir Pimonov, journalist, Ph.D. in literature and linguistics.
