= History of science and technology in Africa =

Map of the regions of Africa

Africa has the world's oldest record of human technological achievement: the oldest surviving stone tools in the world have been found in eastern Africa, and later evidence for tool production by humans' hominin ancestors has been found across West, Central, Eastern and Southern Africa. The history of science and technology in Africa since then has, however, received relatively little attention compared to other regions of the world, despite notable African developments in mathematics, metallurgy, architecture, and other fields.

== Early humans ==
The Great Rift Valley of Africa provides critical evidence for the evolution of early hominins. The earliest tools in the world can be found there as well:

- An unidentified hominin, possibly Australopithecus afarensis or Kenyanthropus platyops, created stone tools dating to 3.3 million years ago at Lomekwi in the Turkana Basin, eastern Africa.
- Homo habilis, residing in eastern Africa, developed another early toolmaking industry, the Oldowan, around 2.3 million years ago.
- Homo erectus developed the Acheulean stone tool industry, specifically hand-axes, at 1.5 million years ago. This tool industry spread to the Middle East and Europe around 800,000 to 600,000 years ago. Homo erectus also begins using fire.
- Homo sapiens, or modern humans, created bone tools and backed blades around 90,000 to 60,000 years ago, in southern and eastern Africa. The use of bone tools and backed blades eventually became characteristic of Later Stone Age tool industries. The first appearance of abstract art is during the Middle Stone Age, however. The oldest abstract art in the world is a shell necklace dated to 82,000 years ago from the Cave of Pigeons in Taforalt, eastern Morocco. The second oldest abstract art and the oldest rock art is found at Blombos Cave in South Africa, dated to 77,000 years ago. There are evidences that Stone Age humans around 100,000 years ago had an elementary knowledge of chemistry in Southern Africa, and that they used a specific recipe to create a liquefied ochre-rich mixture. According to Henshilwood, "This isn't just a chance mixture, it is early chemistry. It suggests conceptual and probably cognitive abilities which are the equivalent of modern humans".

== Education ==
=== Northern Africa and the Nile Valley ===
In 295 BCE, the Library of Alexandria was founded by Greeks in Egypt. It was considered the largest library in the classical world.

Al-Azhar University, founded in 970~972 as a madrasa, is the chief centre of Arabic literature and Sunni Islamic learning in the world. The oldest degree-granting university in Egypt after the Cairo University, its establishment date may be considered 1961 when non-religious subjects were added to its curriculum.

=== West Africa and the Sahel ===
Three madrasas or Islamic schools existed in Mali during the country's "golden age" from the 14th to the 16th centuries: Sankore Madrasah, Sidi Yahya Mosque, and Djinguereber Mosque, all in Timbuktu. The schools consisted of independent scholars who gave instruction to individuals or small groups of students, with special lectures sometimes given in the mosques. There was no overall school administration or prescribed course of study, and libraries consisted of individual private collections of manuscripts. Scholars were drawn from the city's wealthiest families, and instruction was explicitly religious. The main subjects studied by advanced scholars and students were Qur'anic studies, Arabic language, Muhammad, theology, mysticism, and law.

In the 16th century, Timbuktu also housed as many as 150–180 maktabs (Qur'anic schools), where basic reading and recitation of the Qur'an were taught. These schools had an estimated peak enrollment of 4,000–5,000 pupils, including pupils from the surrounding areas.

Within West Africa Timbuktu was a major center of book copying, religious groups, the Islamic sciences, and arts. Books were imported from North Africa and paper was imported from Europe. Books/manuscripts were written primarily in Arabic.

The most famous scholar from Timbuktu was Ahmad Baba (1556–1627), who wrote primarily about Islamic law.

== Astronomy ==
Three types of calendars can be found in Africa: lunar, solar, and stellar. Most African calendars are a combination of the three. African calendars include the Akan calendar, Egyptian calendar, Berber calendar, Ethiopian calendar, Igbo calendar, Yoruba calendar, Shona calendar, Somali calendar, Swahili calendar, Xhosa calendar, Borana calendar, and Luba calendar and Ankole calendar.

=== Northern Africa and the Nile Valley ===
A stone circle located in the Nabta Playa basin may be one of the world's oldest known archeoastronomical devices. Built by the ancient Nubians about 4800 BCE, the device may have approximately marked the summer solstice.

Since the first modern measurements of the precise cardinal orientations of the Egyptian pyramids were taken by Flinders Petrie, various astronomical methods have been proposed as to how these orientations were originally established. Ancient Egyptians may have observed, for example, the positions of two stars in the Plough / Big Dipper which was known to Egyptians as the thigh. It is thought that a vertical alignment between these two stars checked with a plumb bob was used to ascertain where North lay. The deviations from true North using this model reflect the accepted dates of construction of the pyramids.

Egyptians were the first to develop a 365-day, 12 month calendar. It was a stellar calendar, created by observing the stars.

During the 12th century, the astrolabic quadrant was invented in Egypt.

=== West Africa and the Sahel ===
Based on the translation of 14 Timbuktu manuscripts, the following points can be made about astronomical knowledge in Timbuktu during the 14th–16th centuries:

1. They made use of the Julian Calendar.
2. Generally speaking, they had a geocentric view of the Solar System.
3. Some manuscripts included diagrams of planets and orbits along with mathematical calculations.
4. They were able to accurately orient prayer towards Mecca.
5. They recorded astronomical events, including a meteor shower in August 1583.

At this time, West Africa also had a number of astronomers including the emperor and scientist Askia Mohammad I.

=== Eastern Africa ===
Megalithic "pillar sites", known as "namoratunga", date to as early as 5,000 years ago and can be found surrounding Lake Turkana in Kenya. Although somewhat controversial today, initial interpretations suggested that they were used by Cushitic speaking people as an alignment with star systems tuned to a lunar calendar of 354 days.

=== Southern Africa ===
South Africa has an active astronomy community. It hosts the Southern African Large Telescope, the largest optical telescope in the southern hemisphere. The Karoo Array Telescope was constructed as a pathfinder for the $20 billion Square Kilometer Array project. The project is co-hosted by South Africa and Australia.

Due to archeological findings it has been speculated that the kingdoms of Zimbabwe such as Great Zimbabwe and mapungubwe used astronomy. Monolith stones with special engravings thought to be used to track Venus were found. They were compared to Mayan calendars and were found to be more accurate than them

== Mathematics ==
According to Paulus Gerdes, the development of geometrical thinking started early in African history, as early humans learned to "geometricize" in the context of their labor activities. For example, the hunter-gatherers of the Kalahari Desert in southern Africa learned to track animals, learned to recognize and interpret spoors. They got to know that the shape of the spoor provided information on what animal passed by, how long ago, if it was hungry or not, etc. Such developments propelled Louis Liebenberg to posit that the critical attitude of contemporary Kalahari Desert trackers and the role of critical discussion in tracking suggest that the rationalist tradition of science may well have been practiced by hunter-gatherers long before the advent of the Greek philosophic schools. Rock paintings and engravings from all over Africa have been reported. Some of these artifacts date back to several hundreds of years, and others several thousands. They often have geometric structures. Other archaeological finds that indicate geometrical explorations by African hunters, farmers and artisans are stone and metal tools and ceramics. Particularly exceptional are archaeological finds of perishable materials such as baskets, textiles, and wooden objects. The finds from the Tellem are extremely important, as they provide ideas of earlier geometrical explorations. Clear evidence of the exploration of forms, shapes and symmetries exists in the archaeological finds from caves in the Cliff of Bandiagara in the center of Mali. The earliest buildings in the caves are cylindrical granaries made of mud coils that date from the 3rd to the 2nd century BCE.

=== Central and Southern Africa ===
The Lebombo bone from the mountains between Swaziland and South Africa may be the oldest known mathematical artifact. It dates from 35,000 BCE and consists of 29 distinct notches that were deliberately cut into a baboon's fibula.

The Ishango bone is a bone tool from the Democratic Republic of Congo dated to the Upper Paleolithic era, about 18,000 to 20,000 BCE. It is also a baboon's fibula, with a sharp piece of quartz affixed to one end, perhaps for engraving or writing. It was first thought to be a tally stick, as it has a series of tally marks carved in three columns running the length of the tool, but some scientists have suggested that the groupings of notches indicate a mathematical understanding that goes beyond counting. Various functions for the bone have been proposed: it may have been a tool for multiplication, division, and simple mathematical calculation, a six-month lunar calendar, or it may have been made by a woman keeping track of her menstrual cycle.

The Bushong people can distinguish graphs that have Eulerian paths and those that do not. They use such graphs for purposes including embroidery or political prestige. According to a European ethnologist in 1905, Bushong children were not only aware of the conditions which determine whether a given graph is traceable, but they also knew the procedure that permitted it to be drawn most expeditiously. There are various textbooks made by mathematicians using such culturally based graphs and designs to teach mathematics, such as those made by Paulus Gerdes. According to ethnomathematician Claudia Zaslavsky;

Students of all ages and all ethnic backgrounds, as well as their instructors, are fascinated by the Bushoong and Chokwe networks and are impressed by the failure of the European ethnologist Emil Torday to solve the problem set to him by Bushoong children, a problem that presents a challenge to American students and their teachers as well, but was solved easily by African children.

— Africa Counts: Number and Pattern in African Cultures

The "sona" drawing tradition of Angola also exhibit certain mathematical ideas.

In 1982, Rebecca Walo Omana became the first female mathematics professor in the Democratic Republic of the Congo.

=== Northern Africa and the Nile Valley ===
By the predynastic Naqada period in Egypt, people had fully developed a numeral system. The importance of mathematics to an educated Egyptian is suggested by a New Kingdom fictional letter in which the writer proposes a scholarly competition between himself and another scribe regarding everyday calculation tasks such as accounting of land, labor and grain. Texts such as the Rhind Mathematical Papyrus and the Moscow Mathematical Papyrus show that the ancient Egyptians could perform the four basic mathematical operations—addition, subtraction, multiplication, and division—use fractions, knew the formula to compute the volume of a frustum, and calculate the surface areas of triangles, circles and even hemispheres. They understood basic concepts of algebra and geometry, and could solve simple sets of simultaneous equations.

D22
2/3
in hieroglyphs

Mathematical notation was decimal, and based on hieroglyphic signs for each power of ten up to one million. Each of these could be written as many times as necessary to add up to the desired number; so to write the number eighty or eight hundred, the symbol for ten or one hundred was written eight times respectively. Because their methods of calculation could not handle most fractions with a numerator greater than one, ancient Egyptian fractions had to be written as the sum of several fractions. For example, the fraction two-fifths was resolved into the sum of one-third + one-fifteenth; this was facilitated by standard tables of values. Some common fractions, however, were written with a special glyph; the equivalent of the modern two-thirds is shown on the right.

Ancient Egyptian mathematicians had a grasp of the principles underlying the Pythagorean theorem, knowing, for example, that a triangle had a right angle opposite the hypotenuse when its sides were in a 3–4–5 ratio. They were able to estimate the area of a circle by subtracting one-ninth from its diameter and squaring the result:

Area ≈ [(8/9)D]^{2} = (256/81)r^{2} ≈ 3.16r^{2},

a reasonable approximation of the formula πr^{2}.

The golden ratio seems to be reflected in many Egyptian constructions, including the pyramids, but its use may have been an unintended consequence of the ancient Egyptian practice of combining the use of knotted ropes with an intuitive sense of proportion and harmony.

Based on engraved plans of Meroitic King Amanikhabali's pyramids, Nubians had a sophisticated understanding of mathematics and an appreciation of the harmonic ratio. The engraved plans is indicative of much to be revealed about Nubian mathematics.

=== West Africa ===
Historian Kani A. M. examined the history of mathematics in pre-colonial Central Sudan as cited in Gerdes (1994). Arithmetic was first introduced in Kanem-Bornu after the 11th century and in Hausaland around the 15th century. Arithmetic was taught in the schools of the region and it was used by the states for calculating inheritance, in business transactions, land surveying as well as the collection and distribution of zakat. In the 18th century, scholars such as Muhammad ibn Muhammad al-Kishnawi worked on chronograms and magic squares.

== Metallurgy ==
Most of Africa moved from the Stone Age to the Iron Age. The Iron Age and Bronze Age occurred simultaneously. North Africa and the Nile Valley imported its iron technology from the Near East and followed the Near Eastern pattern of development from the Bronze Age to the Iron Age.

Many Africanists accept an independent development of the use of iron south of the Sahara. Among archaeologists, it is a debatable issue. The earliest dating of iron outside of North Africa is 2500 BCE at Egaro, west of Termit, making it contemporary with iron smelting in the Middle East. The Egaro date is debatable with archaeologists, due to the method used to attain it. The Termit date of 1500 BCE is widely accepted. Iron at the site of Lejja, Nigeria, has been radiocarbon dated to approximately 2000 BCE. Iron use, in smelting and forging for tools, appears in West Africa by 1200 BCE, making it one of the first places for the birth of the Iron Age. Before the 19th century, African methods of extracting iron were employed in Brazil, until more advanced European methods were instituted.

John K. Thornton concludes that Africans metalworkers were producing their goods at the same or higher levels of productivity as their European counterparts.

Archaeometallurgical scientific knowledge and technological development originated in numerous centers of Africa; the centers of origin were located in West Africa, Central Africa, and East Africa; consequently, as these origin centers are located within inner Africa, these archaeometallurgical developments are thus native African technologies. Iron metallurgical development occurred 2631 BCE – 2458 BCE at Lejja, in Nigeria, 2136 BCE – 1921 BCE at Obui, in Central Africa Republic, 1895 BCE – 1370 BCE at Tchire Ouma 147, in Niger, and 1297 BCE – 1051 BCE at Dekpassanware, in Togo.

=== West Africa ===
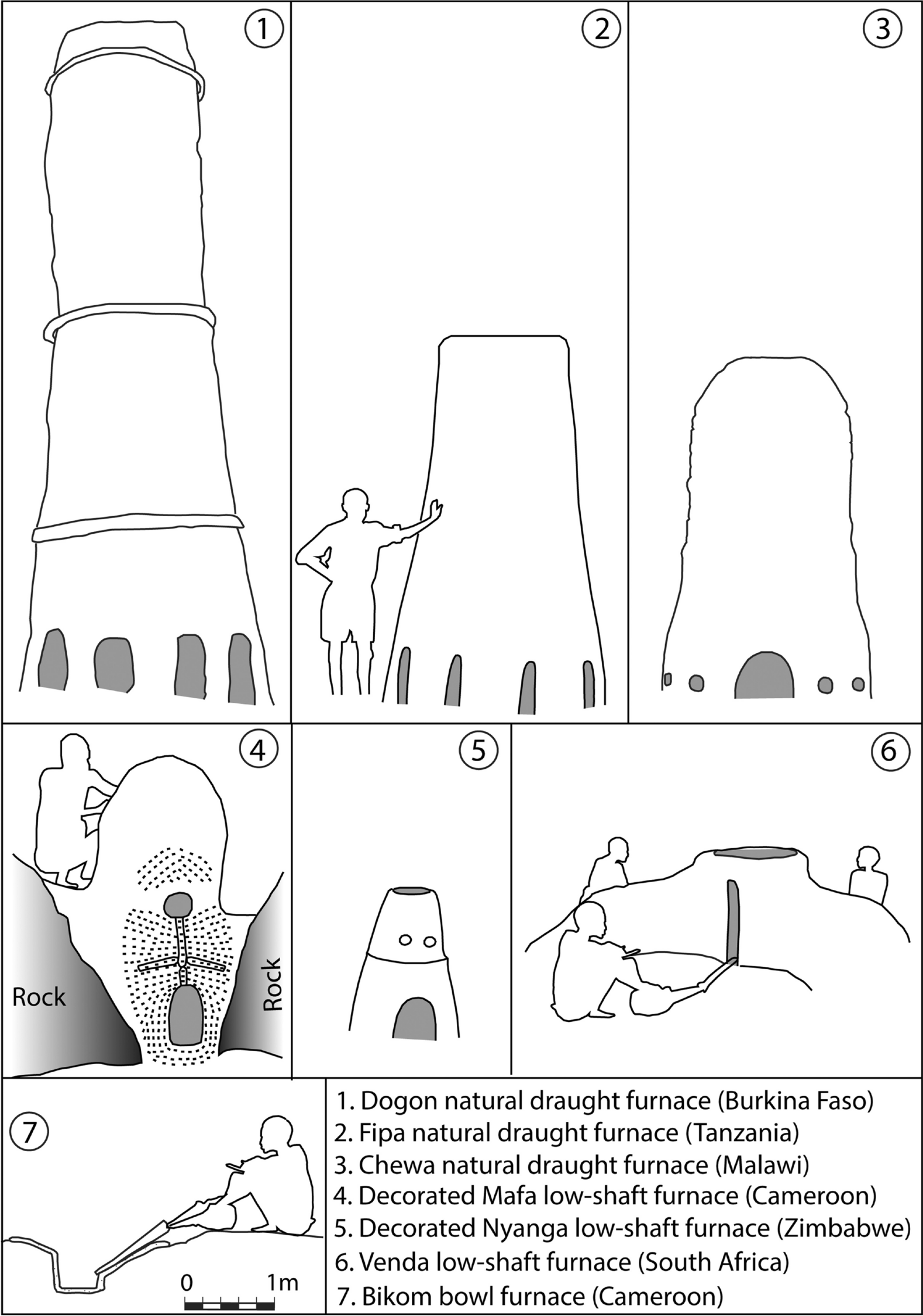
Examples of African bloomery furnace types

Besides being masters in iron, Africans were masters in brass, copper, and bronze. Ife showed artistic mastery in their striking naturalistic statues of brass and copper, a lost wax tradition beginning in the 11-12th centuries. Ife was also a manufacturer of glass and glass beads. Benin later mastered a mix of brass and bronze during the 16th century, producing portraiture and reliefs in the metals.

In West Africa, several centres of iron production using natural draft furnaces emerged from the early second millennium CE. Iron production in Banjeli and Bassar for example in Togo reached up to 80,000 cubic meters(which is more than the production at places such as Meroe), analyses indicate that fifteenth-and sixteenth-century CE slags from this area were just bloomery waste products, while preliminary metallographic analyses of objects indicate them to be made of low-carbon steels. In Burkina Faso, the Korsimoro district reached up to 169,900 cubic meters. In the Dogon region, the sub-region of Fiko has about 300,000 cubic meters of slag produced.

Brass barrel blunderbuss are said to have been produced in some states of the Gold Coast in the eighteenth and nineteenth centuries. Various accounts indicate that Asante blacksmiths were not only able to repair firearms, but that barrels, locks and stocks were on occasion remade.

In the Aïr Mountains region of Niger, copper smelting was independently developed between 3000 and 2500 BCE. The undeveloped nature of the process indicates that it was not of foreign origin. Smelting in the region became mature around 1500 BCE.

=== The Sahel ===
Africa was a major supplier of gold in world trade during the Medieval Age. The Sahelian empires became powerful by controlling the Trans-Saharan trade routes. They provided 2/3 of the gold in Europe and North Africa. The Almoravid dinar and the Fatimid dinar were printed on gold from the Sahelian empires. The ducat of Genoa and Venice and the florine of Florence were also printed on gold from the Sahelian empires. When gold sources were depleted in the Sahel, the empires turned to trade with the Ashanti Empire.

The Swahili traders in East Africa were major suppliers of gold to Asia in the Red Sea and Indian Ocean trade routes. The trading port cities and city-states of the Swahili East African coast were among the first African cities to come into contact with European explorers and sailors during the European Age of Discovery. Many were documented and praised in the recordings of North African explorer Abu Muhammad ibn Battuta.

=== Northern Africa and the Nile Valley ===
Nubia was a major source of gold in the ancient world. Gold was a major source of Kushitic wealth and power. Gold was mined East of the Nile in Wadi Allaqi and Wadi Cabgaba.

Around 500 BCE, Nubia, during the Meroitic phase, became a major manufacturer and exporter of iron. This was after being expelled from Egypt by Assyrians, who used iron weapons.

=== East Africa ===
The Aksumites produced coins around 270 CE, under the rule of King Endybis. Aksumite coins were issued in gold, silver, and bronze.

Since 600 BCE, Bantu peoples in Uganda had been producing high-grade carbon steels using preheated forced draft furnaces, a technique achieved in Europe only with the Siemons process in the mid-19th century. Anthropologist Peter Schmidt discovered through the communication of oral tradition that the Haya in Tanzania have been forging steel for over 2000 years. This discovery was made accidentally while Schmidt was learning about the history of the Haya via their oral tradition. He was led to a tree which was said to rest on the spot of an ancestral furnace used to forge steel. When later tasked with the challenge of recreating the forges, a group of elders who at this time were the only ones to remember the practice, due to the disuse of the practice due in part to the abundance of steel flowing into the country from foreign sources. In spite of their lack of practice, the elders were able to create a furnace using mud and grass which when burnt provided the carbon needed to transform the iron into steel. Later investigation of the area yielded 13 other furnaces similar in design to the recreation set up by the elders. These furnaces were carbon dated and were found to be as old as 2000 years, whereas steel of this caliber did not appear in Europe until several centuries later.

Two types of iron furnaces were used in most of Africa: the trench dug below ground and circular clay structures built above ground. Iron ores were crushed and placed in furnaces layered with the right proportion of hardwood. A flux such as lime sometimes from seashells was added to aid in smelting. Bellows on the side would be used to add oxygen. Clay pipes on the sides called tuyères would be used to control oxygen flow.

=== Central Africa ===
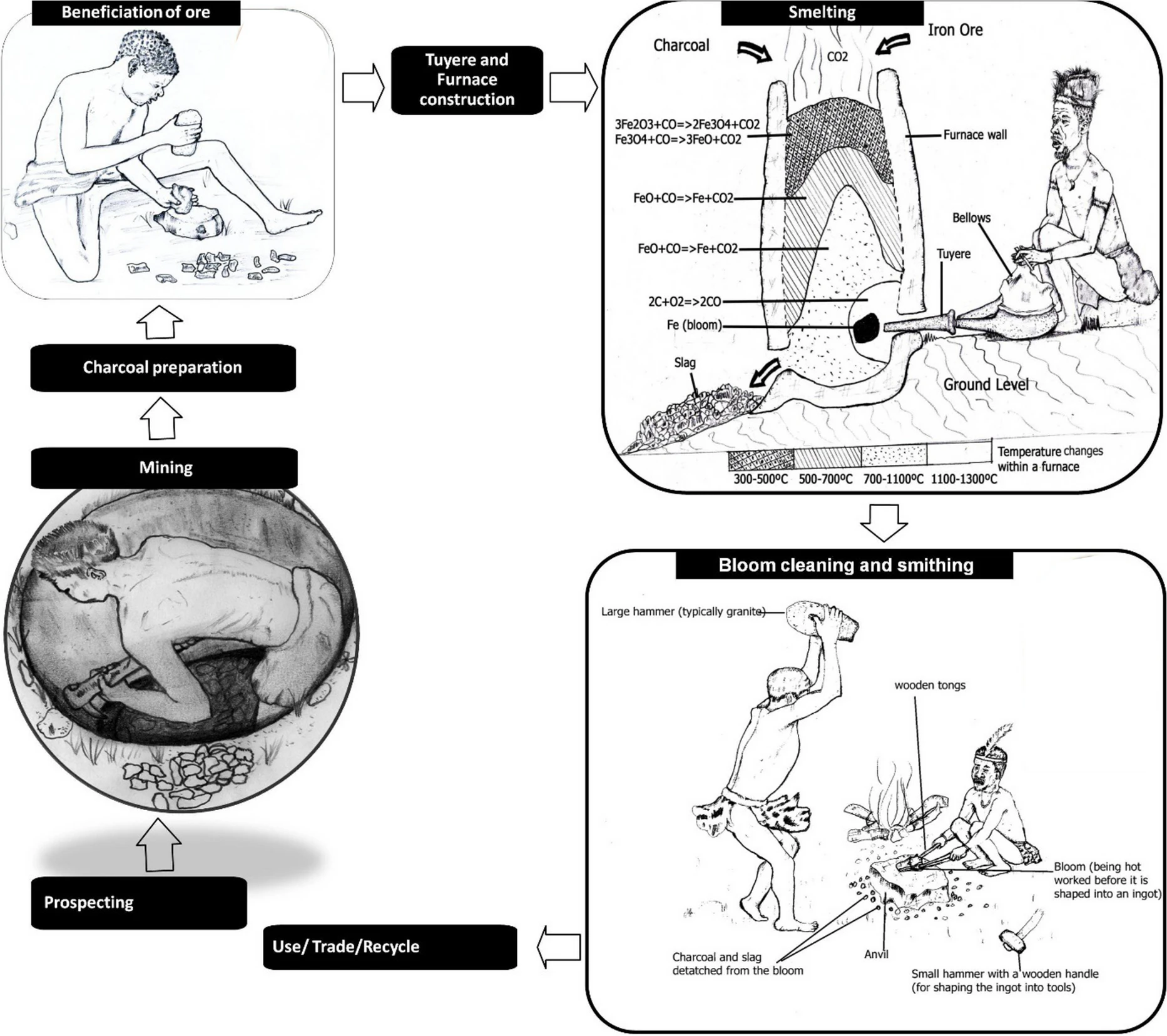
Typical bloomery iron production operational sequence starting with acquiring raw materials through smelting and smithing

Two examples of European efforts to compete with African iron production highlight the degree of skill possessed by Kongo smiths. The first was a Portuguese effort to establish an iron foundry in Angola in the 1750s. The foundry was unsuccessful in transferring technology to Kongo black smiths; rather, "it concentrated smiths from across the colony in one area under one wage-labor system. Such methods were a tacit recognition of Kongo ironworking skill. The Portuguese foundry at Novas Oerias utilized European techniques was unsuccessful, never becoming competitive with Angolan smiths. The iron produced by Kongo smiths was superior to that of European imports produced under European processes. There was no incentive to replace Kongo iron with European iron unless Kongo iron was unavailable. European iron of the period contained a high amount of sulfur and when compared to the high carbon steel produced by Kongo iron processes, was less durable, a "rotten" metal. European iron was the second choice, whether the purchaser was from Asante, Yoruba or Kongo. The key to the gradual acceptance of European iron was ecological disaster. Gaucher (1981) believes that deforestation led to increased reliance on pre-forged European iron bars that could be carbonized in furnaces using less charcoal than smelting iron from ore. In a similar development elsewhere in the world, English iron production was crippled by the depletion of English forests for charcoal for English forges. In 1750 the Iron Act would force their American colonies to export their iron exclusively to England. This was amongst other well known reasons one of the grievances the colonists had against the English crown and a contributory factor the American Revolution". Another series of wars in Kongo however would ensure that the technical expertise to support English demand was in existence in America, albeit as slave labor. When African techniques could no longer create high quality carbon steel the lower quality European iron became a necessity. Lower quality iron also became more acceptable as the need to supply large numbers of warriors (numbering in the hundreds of thousands) with weapons quickly pushed out considerations of artisan-quality steel versus "rotten iron" imports. War broke out in the Kingdom of Kongo and after 1665; much of the stability and access to iron ore and charcoal necessary for smiths to ply their craft was disrupted. Many Kongo people were sold as slaves and their skills became invaluable in New World settings as blacksmiths, charcoal makers and ironworkers for their colonial masters. Slaves were relied upon to produce vital components for the forges and as their skills in iron working became evident, their importance to colonial economies grew.

At Oboui they excavated an undated iron forge yielding eight consistent radiocarbon dates of 2000 BCE. This would make Oboui the oldest iron-working site in the world, and more than a thousand years older than any other dated evidence of iron in Central Africa.

== Medicine ==
Traditional African plants such as Ouabain, capsicum, yohimbine, ginger, white squill, African kino, African copaiba, African myrrh, Buchu, physostigmine, and Kola nut have been adopted and continue to be used by Western doctors.

=== West Africa and the Sahel ===
The knowledge of inoculating oneself against smallpox seems to have been known to West Africans, more specifically the Akan. A slave named Onesimus explained the inoculation procedure to Cotton Mather during the 18th century; he reported to have gotten the knowledge from Africa.

Bonesetting is practiced by many groups of West Africa (the Akan, Mano, and Yoruba, to name a few).

The dangers of tobacco smoking were known to African Muslim scholars, based on Timbuktu manuscripts.

Palm oil was important in health and hygiene. A German visiting in 1603-1604 reported that people washed themselves three times a day, "after which they anoint themselves with tallow or with palm oil, which is an excellent medicine". Palm oil protected the skin and hair, and it had cosmetic value in many cultures. Women (and sometimes men) spread palm oil on their skin to "shine the whole day". Palm oil was also a useful way of applying decorative color and perfumes, like powdered camwood. Many Africans considered palm oil to be a medicine in its own right, and it served as a medium for delivering other curative substances. Historical sources recount healers mixing herbs with palm oil to treat skin conditions or ease headaches. A seventeenth-century Portuguese source describes palm oil as a "popular cure" in Angola, while the "leaves, roots, bark and fruit" of the oil palm were used to treat conditions ranging from arthritis to snake and insect bites. Foreign visitors praised the quality of soap made from palm and palm kernel oils, mixed with ashes from palm fronds. One writer attested that "the Negroes Cloathes are very clean" as a result. The roasting method often used to extract kernel oil produced the characteristic color of the famous "black soap" made by West African artisans. Palm and palm kernel soaps were traded extensively in regional markets.

Admiring West African medicinal prowess, Johannes Rask concluded that "Africans are much better suited than we are, as regards their health care".

During the Atlantic slave trade, European sailors reported how African slaves would be able to recover from outbreaks of diseases like smallpox within the ships by using their traditional medicine which included palm oil. Europeans would use these themselves to help against dysentery. The bark of yams were used to treat worm infestations.

The negroes are so innocent to the smallpox, that few ships that carry them escape without it, and sometimes it makes vast havoc and a destruction among them; but though we had 100 at a time sick of it, and that it went through the ship, yet we lost not above a dozen by it. All the assistance we gave the diseased was only as much water as they desired to drink, and some palm oil to anoint their sores, and they would generally recover without any other help but what kind nature gave them.

— Thomas Phillips, A Collection of Voyages and Travels (1732)

=== Northern Africa and the Nile Valley ===
Ancient Egyptian physicians were renowned in the ancient Near East for their healing skills, and some, like Imhotep, remained famous long after their deaths. Herodotus remarked that there was a high degree of specialization among Egyptian physicians, with some treating only the head or the stomach, while others were eye-doctors and dentists. Training of physicians took place at the Per Ankh or "House of Life" institution, most notably those headquartered in Per-Bastet during the New Kingdom and at Abydos and Saïs in the Late period. Medical papyri show empirical knowledge of anatomy, injuries, and practical treatments. Wounds were treated by bandaging with raw meat, white linen, sutures, nets, pads and swabs soaked with honey to prevent infection, while opium was used to relieve pain. Garlic and onions were used regularly to promote good health and were thought to relieve asthma symptoms. Ancient Egyptian surgeons stitched wounds, set broken bones, and amputated diseased limbs, but they recognized that some injuries were so serious that they could only make the patient comfortable until he died.

Around 800, the first psychiatric hospital and insane asylum in Egypt was built by Muslim physicians in Cairo.

In 1285, the largest hospital of the Middle Ages and pre-modern era was built in Cairo, Egypt, by Sultan Qalaun al-Mansur. Treatment was given for free to patients of all backgrounds, regardless of gender, ethnicity or income.

Tetracycline was being used by Nubians, based on bone remains between 350 CE and 550 CE. The antibiotic was in wide commercial use only in the mid 20th century. The theory is earthen jars containing grain used for making beer contained the bacterium streptomycedes, which produced tetracycline. Although Nubians were not aware of tetracycline, they could have noticed people fared better by drinking beer. According to Charlie Bamforth, a professor of biochemistry and brewing science at the University of California, Davis, said "They must have consumed it because it was rather tastier than the grain from which it was derived. They would have noticed people fared better by consuming this product than they were just consuming the grain itself."

=== East Africa ===
European travelers in the Great Lakes region of Africa during the 19th century reported cases of surgery in the kingdom of Bunyoro-Kitara. Medical historians, such as Jack Davies argued in 1959 that Bunyoro's traditional healers were perhaps the most highly skilled in precolonial sub-Saharan Africa, possessing a remarkable level of medical knowledge. One observer noted a "surgical skill which had reached a high standard". Caesarean sections and other abdominal and thoracic operations were performed on a regular basis with the avoidance of haemorrhage and sepsis using antiseptics, anaesthetics and cautery iron. The expectant mother was normally anesthetized with banana wine, and herbal mixtures were used to encourage healing. From the well-developed nature of the procedures employed, European observers concluded that they had been employed for some time. Bunyoro surgeons treated lung inflammations, Pneumonia and pleurisy by punching holes in the chest until the air passed freely. Trephining was carried out and the bones of depressed fractures were elevated. Horrible war wounds, even penetrating abdominal and chest wounds were treated with success, even when this involved quite heroic surgery. Amputations were done by tying a tight ligature just above the line of amputation and neatly cutting off the limb, stretched out on a smooth log, with one stroke of a sharp sword. Banyoro surgeons had a good knowledge of anatomy, in part obtained by carrying out autopsies. Inoculation against smallpox was carried out in Bunyoro and its neighbouring kingdoms. Over 200 plants are used medicinally in eastern Bunyoro alone and recent tests have shown that traditional cures for eczema and post-measles bloody diarrhoea were more effective than western medications. Bunyoro's Medical elite, the "Bafumu", had a system of apprenticeship and even "met at periods for conferences". In Bunyoro, there was a close relationship between the state and traditional healers. Kings gave healers "land spread in the different areas so that their services would reach more people". Moreover, "in the case of a disease hitting a given area", the king would order healers into the affected district. Kabaleega is said to have provided his soldiers were anti-malarial herbs, and even to have organized medical research. A Munyoro healer reported in 1902 that when an outbreak of what he termed sleeping sickness occurred in Bunyoro around 1886–87, causing many deaths, Kabaleega ordered him "to make experiments in the interest of science", which were "eventually successful in procuring a cure". Barkcloth, which was used to bandage wounds, has been proven to be antimicrobial.

Brain surgery was also practiced in the Great Lakes region of Africa

In the Kingdom of Rwanda, people afflicted with Yaws were put into quarantine and if necessary, kings closed the kingdom's borders to combat the spread of smallpox.

=== Central Africa ===
General and local anesthesia were widely used by traditional doctors in many parts of central Africa. Beer containing an extract of kaffir was orally given to those who sustained deep wounds from animal attacks or from warfare in order to alleviate pain, and alkaloid containing leaves were also applied topically to injuries. Many tribes in central Africa performed cataract surgery under local anesthesia, squeezing juices from alkaloid plants directly into the eyes to desensitize them and then pushing the cataract aside with a sharp stick, with many cases turning out successful. "The surgical skill itself was also astonishing and suggested a long experience of this practice".

=== Southern Africa ===
A South African, Max Theiler, developed a vaccine against yellow fever in 1937. Allan McLeod Cormack developed the theoretical underpinnings of CT scanning and co-invented the CT-scanner.

The first human-to-human heart transplant was performed by South African cardiac surgeon Christiaan Barnard at Groote Schuur Hospital in December 1967. See also Hamilton Naki.

During the 1960s, South African Aaron Klug developed crystallographic electron microscopy techniques, in which a sequence of two-dimensional images of crystals taken from different angles are combined to produce three-dimensional images of the target.

The Zulu king represented the ultimate public health official. As Ndukwana, one of Stuart's respondents, explains, "All people like the land they lived on belonged to the king. If any man got seriously ill, his illness would be notified to the mnumzana[head-man], who would instantly report the fact to the izinduna (chiefs) and they to the king. The king would then most likely give the order to consult diviners so as to discover the nature and cause of his illness. A sick man in Zululand was always an object of great importance.' In theory the Zulu king and his local chiefs took responsibility for the well-being of their people and surrounded themselves with a variety of different doctors to assist them in this function. While not all illness was brought to the attention of the king, kraal heads had to report illness to their local chiefs. Depending on the social status of the ill person or number of persons afflicted, a report would be sent to the king. The Zulu proverb inkosi yinkosi ngabantu-a king is a king by the people, emphasized the reciprocal relationship between a king and his people. In exchange for the labor and loyalty of his subjects, the king provided for the welfare of his people, and his failure to do so could lead people to konza to another ruler. Zulu-speakers who konza'ed white rulers in neighboring Natal thus could not understand why such responsibilities were not also assumed by their new rulers. Another reason sickness and death sometimes gained attention at the highest levels of the state was the link between illness and witchcraft. Illness represented the possibility of persons who sought to destabilize the chiefdom or nation, and consequently chiefs could get in trouble for not reporting illness. Upon learning of an illness, a chief or the king would sometimes provide his own doctors, presumably the best in the area, or send for doctors or medicines from the surrounding regions. In some cases the king provided his own personal medicines. The state of public health thus also represented the metaphorical health of the nation state. During periods of crisis, such as droughts, epidemics, locust infestations, or epizootics, the king would summon his best doctors and mobilize a national response. One notable medical phenomenon led state healers to connect a number of unexplained deaths to the wearing of a whitish metal (perhaps tin or silver). By order of either Tshaka or Dingane, the sources seem unclear on this point, this metal was banned and collected from around the nation and buried. This shows the reach and power of the Zulu state in carrying out public health initiatives. Another example, perhaps more typical, were the bands of soldiers who were marshaled to kill locusts during times of infestation. Likewise periods of drought led the king not only to hire reputed raindoctors for the nation but to mobilize people to look for inkhonkwanes-herbs (over 240 medicinal plants were used by the Zulu) and medicine pegs put on mountaintops by unthakathis seeking to prevent rain and thus cause social disruption. Whereas these examples point to a reactive form of public health, a number of preventative measures and rituals occurred during public festivals such as the yearly Inyatela (First Fruits) and umkhosi (royal) celebrations. At these celebrations, large groups of people from around the nation came to witness and participate in ceremonies that took place within a short span of each other in December and January. At these festivals, the king, as the preeminent healer of the land, accompanied Healing the Body by his doctors and regiments, performed preventative measures aimed at ensuring the well-being of the nation and all who lived in it.

Bone-setting was commonly practiced in Southern Africa by the native communities. Even broken fingers were treated. Abdominal wounds with protruding intestines were manipulated successfully by inserting a small calabash to hold the intestines in place and suturing the skin over it.

== Agriculture ==
Tropical soils are typically low in organic matter and so present special problems to agriculturalists. Indeed, African soils, (outside alluvial and volcanic areas) are in large part deficient in the characteristics of structure, texture, and chemistry which mainly determine soil fertility. Tropical areas do not have a winter season, so micro-organisms continue to break down organic matter throughout the year. Tropical soils typically have very small percentages of organic matter or humus (sometimes as little as 1%) as a result. Soils in temperate climates may, in contrast, consist of 12 to 14 or (in virgin soils in the Midwestern United States) up to 16% organic materials, because the cold winters slow the processes of decomposition and allow organic material to build up over time. In many tropical regions, farmers practice a semi-sedentary form of agriculture, using fields for two or three years and then abandoning them for a decade or more (up to 25 years after two years of cultivation in the case of savanna woodlands in Africa), until the humus content has been restored by natural processes.

Through careful observation, experimentation and selection of desirable traits over the course of 2,000 years, Africans managed to create a rich diversity of Banana and plantain types (120 different types of plantains and 60 different types of bananas). Due to this there emerged a second area of Banana diversification outside of Asia, one with the Highland cooking banana in the African Great Lakes and the Plantain in West and Central Africa. This shows the agricultural skills and innovative practices Africans mastered and continuously developed in the millennia before Europeans arrived into the continent.

Like the natives of the Amazon rainforest, Africans also utilized dark earths similar to Terra preta.

=== Northern Africa and the Nile Valley ===
Archaeologists have long debated whether or not the independent domestication of cattle occurred in Africa as well as the Near East and Indus Valley. Possible remains of domesticated cattle were identified in the Western Desert of Egypt at the sites of Nabta Playa and Bir Kiseiba and were dated to c. 9500–8000 BP, but those identifications have been questioned. Genetic evidence suggests that cattle were most likely introduced from Southwest Asia, and that there may have been some later breeding with wild aurochs in northern Africa.

Genetic evidence also indicates that donkeys were domesticated from the African wild ass. Archaeologists have found donkey burials in early dynastic contexts dating to ~5000 BP at Abydos, Middle Egypt, and examination of the bones shows that they were used as beasts of burden.

Cotton (Gossypium herbaceum Linnaeus) may have been domesticated 5000 BCE in eastern Sudan near the Middle Nile Basin region, where cotton cloth was being produced.

=== East Africa ===
Finger millet is originally native to the highlands of East Africa and was domesticated before the third millennium BCE in Uganda and Ethiopia. Its cultivation had spread to South India by 1800 BCE.

Engaruka is an Iron Age archaeological site in northern Tanzania known for the ruins of a complex irrigation system. Stone channels were used to dike, dam, and level surrounding river waters. Some of these channels were several kilometers long, channelling and feeding individual plots of land totaling approximately 5,000 acres (20 km^{2}). Seven stone-terraced villages along the mountainside also comprise the settlement.

The Shilluk Kingdom gained control of the west bank of the white Nile as far north as Kosti in Sudan. There they established an economy based on cereal farming and fishing, with permanent settlements located along the length of the river. The Shilluk developed an extremely intensive system of agriculture based on sorghum, millet and other crops. By the 1600s, shillukland had a population density similar or exceeding that of the Egyptian Nile lands.

Ethiopians, particularly the Oromo people, were the first to have discovered and recognized the energizing effect of the coffee bean plant.

Ox-drawn plows seems to have been used in Ethiopia for two millennia, and possibly much longer. Linguistic evidences suggests that the Ethiopian plow might be the oldest plow in Africa.

Teff is believed to have originated in Ethiopia between 4000 and 1000 BCE. Genetic evidence points to E. pilosa as the most likely wild ancestor. Noog (Guizotia abyssinica) and ensete (E. ventricosum) are two other plants domesticated in Ethiopia.

Ethiopians used terraced hillside cultivation for erosion prevention and irrigation. A 19th century European described Yeha:

All the surrounding hills have been terraced for cultivation, and present much the same appearance as the hills in Greece and Asia Minor, which have been neglected for centuries; but nowhere in Greece or Asia Minor have I ever seen such an enormous extent of terraced mountains as in this Abyssinian valley. Hundreds and thousands of acres must here have been under the most careful cultivation, right up almost to the tops of the mountains, and now nothing is left but the regular lines of the sustaining walls, and a few trees dotted about here and there. This valley is most completely shut in, quite such a one as one can imagine Rasselas to have lived in

— James T. Bent, The sacred city of the Ethiopians, being a record of travel and research in Abyssinia in 1893 (1896)

Bantu farmers in East Africa experimented with all available crops and sought to produce as many as possible.

Since communications and markets were relatively poorly developed, the farmer had to sow a great variety of crops with a great variety of characteristics, in order to survive no matter what the climatic variations, so that he would not be, in effect, wiped out. By taking a single ecological zone, understanding its complexity with a thoroughness incomprehensible to even a Westerner, developing a rich and subtle language with a profusion of terms for the understanding of local ecology, planting dozens of crops to which the environment was peculiarly suited, the farmer sought to defeat famine, to cheat death.

within the African Great Lakes advanced agriculture practices were employed such as "hydraulic practices in the mountains, man-made watering places, river diversions, hollowed-out tree-trunk pipes, irrigation on cultivated slopes, mounding in drained marshes, and irrigation of banana and palm tree gardens" as well as extensive use of terraces and the practice of double and triple cropping. The agrarian success of the Great Lakes civilization accounts for its exceptionally high levels of human density. Many foreign experts were impressed by the sophistication of the areas traditional methods of intensive farming. The agriculture of the great lakes was described below:

The "beautiful irrigated fields", the steep terraced slopes of the thousand hills, where every patch of ground is put to use, the "well-fed cattle with colossal horns" were "wonderful discoveries" to the Europeans. But even greater surprises awaited them.

— Christian P. Scherrer, Genocide and Crisis in Central Africa: Conflict Roots, Mass Violence, and Regional War

The earliest Europeans to visit Rwanda observed intense pride in cultivating skills. A mother would give a crying baby a toy hoe to play with and a range of techniques often superior to those of eastern European peasants, notably the use of manure, terracing, and artificial irrigation.

The Chaga people have long practiced an advanced form of agriculture which allowed them to maintain a high population density involving the control and distribution of water. Europeans wrote of their admirably constructed irrigation works and the care they witnessed in the maintenance of them and their powerfully centralized social organization. Sir Harry Johnston, writing in 1894, echoed this praise of Chagga industry and skill:

They mostly excel in their husbandry, the skill with which they irrigate their terraced hillsides with tiny runnels of eater shows considerable advancement in agriculture. Their time is constantly spent in tilling the soil, manuring it with ashes, raking it and hoeing it with wooden hoes

— William Allan, The African Husbandman

=== West Africa and the Sahel ===
The earliest evidence for the domestication of plants for agricultural purposes in Africa occurred in the Sahel region c. 5000 BCE, when sorghum and African rice (Oryza glaberrima) began to be cultivated. Around this time, and in the same region, the small guineafowl was domesticated. Other African domesticated plants were oil palm, raffia palm, African yam, black-eyed peas, Bambara groundnut, Cowpea, Fonio, Pearl millet, and kola nuts.

Investigations in the Upper Guinea forest region by found connections between palm oil processing, "sacred agroforests", and anthropogenic soil, or "dark earths". They identified "palm oil production pits" as central loci for the formation of dark earths, where charred palm kernels and other organic materials enriched soils for use in fields of vegetables and trees. Once left fallow those fields gradually morphed into biodiverse groves of palms and other forest species. These anthropogenic landscapes, patches of AfDES (African dark earths) and anthropogenic vegetation are permeated with symbolic significance because they are the ongoing outcome of inhabitation trajectories begun by ancestors, continuing to the present day. They are not simply areas of improved soils and anthropogenic agroforests, but the relics of old towns, villages, kitchens, graveyards, and initiation society areas, many of which were inhabited by direct ancestors of current inhabitants.

African oil palms were most abundant as part of the oil palm-yam complex beginning just south and east of the rice belt running from Lower Guinea across the derived savannas of the Dahomey Gap and through the Niger Delta. From there oil palm cultivation extended deep into the Central African rainforests where swidden farmers spared and managed palms within their plots of yams, cocoyams, plantains, legumes, and other crops, and where dense rainforest alternated with emergent oil palm groves. Long disparaged by some Western scientists and environmentalists as "slash-and-burn", ecological research since the mid-twentieth century has demonstrated the efficacy of such ancestral systems, linking traditional swidden-fallow landscapes with enhanced floral and faunal biodiversity, higher returns on labor investment, food security, nutritional balance, and overall resilience and reliability, especially when compared to monocultures. Throughout western Africa, oil palm agroforests helped to nourish human communities by contributing to food security and balanced diets, complementing carbohydrate-rich tubers and grains with fats, provitamin A carotenoids (mainly a-and B-carotenes), and vitamin E. The source of fats is particularly important within the broad swath of sub-Saharan Africa where the voracious tsetse fly and the trypanosomiasis pathogens it carries make livestock husbandry virtually impossible.

African methods of cultivating rice, introduced by enslaved Africans, may have been used in North Carolina. This may have been a factor in the prosperity of the North Carolina colony. Portuguese observers between the half of the 15th century and the 16th century witnessed the cultivation of rice in the Upper Guinea Coast, and admired the local rice-growing technology, as it involved intensive agricultural practices such as diking and transplanting.

Yams were domesticated 8000 BCE in West Africa. Between 7000 and 5000 BCE, pearl millet, gourds, watermelons, and beans also spread westward across the southern Sahara.

Between 6500 and 3500 BCE knowledge of domesticated sorghum, castor beans, and two species of gourd spread from Africa to Asia. Pearl millet, black-eyed peas, watermelon, and okra later spread to the rest of the world.

In the lack of more detailed historical and archaeological studies on the chronology of terracing, intensive terrace farming is believed to have been practiced before the early 15th century CE in West Africa. Terraces were used by many groups, notably the Mafa, Ngas, Gwoza, and the Dogon.

=== Southern Africa ===
In order to prevent erosion, southern Africans built dry-stone terraces on steep hillsides.

Randall MacIver describes the irrigation technology used in Nyanga, Zimbabwe:

The country about Inyanga is well watered, but it would seem that the old inhabitants

required a more general distribution of the supply than was afforded by the numerous

streams running down from the hills. Accordingly, they adopted a practice which has been prevalent under similar conditions in several other countries, Algeria being one instancewhich has come under the waiter's own observation. The stream was tapped at a point near its source, and part of the water deflected by a stone dam. This gave them a high-level conduit, by which the water could be carried along the side of a hill and allowed to descend more gradually than the parent stream. There are very many such conduits in the Inyanga region, and they often run for several miles. The gradients are admirably calculated, with a skill which is not always equalled by modern engineers with their elaborate instruments. The dams are well and strongly built of unworked stones without mortar; the conduits themselves are simple trenches about one metre in depth. The earth taken out of the trench is piled on its lower side and supported by boulders imbedded in ito.

Cattle features as a primary source of sustenance and political and economic power in many parts of southern Africa. Sotho, Tswana and Nguni kingdoms rose to prominence on the back of successful cattle keeping, supplemented by cultivation.

Cattle (and possibly goats) played a central role in Nguni culture. Nguni-speaking South Africans in KwaZulu-Natal revered the Nguni cattle. By 1824, Shaka Zulu's royal cattle pen contained 7,000 pure white Nguni cattle. Similarly, when the original pioneers arrived in Zimbabwe (then Rhodesia), they reported that the country was 'teeming with cattle that were, apparently, in good health and were immune to local diseases'.

Before 1850, there were an estimated four to five million Nguni cattle in what is now KwaZulu-Natal. Indeed it could have been said that, so immense was the number of cattle, idaka liye lahlaba ezulwini (the kraal-mud was splashed up to heaven), but war, disease, political unrest and the introduction by whites of their own cattle, led to a decline in numbers so that a decade ago only about 100,000 pure Ngunis remained. In 1879, at the close of the Anglo-Zulu War, in which the power of the Zulu Kingdom was broken, Sir Garnet Wolseley ensured the end of the Zulu royal herds by slaughtering and confiscating what remained.

— Marguerite Poland, The Abundant Herds

South Africans were known for being experts in finding lost cattle. A single Zulu was able to locate 10 cattle that were lost during conflict two years ago over a large area.

Like many traditional societies, the Himba have sharp vision and focus, believed to come from their cattle rearing and need to identify each cow's markings.

=== Central Africa ===
For many years, scientists argued that Africa's first agriculturalists hacked and burned their way through a primeval "Guineo-Congolian rainforest" stretching from Sierra Leone to Congo and beyond. In this telling, oil palms were the survivors of forests destroyed by African farmers, leaving "derived savannah" behind. New research has overturned that interpretation, however. An "aridification event" about 4,000–5,000 years ago wiped out forests and encouraged the spread of grassland across western Africa. Oil palms probably expanded into these gaps ahead of human settlers, the seeds spread by animals. Humans helped the palm along, though, protecting it from grassland fires and voracious elephants. Linguistic evidence shows a close link between oil palm dispersion and the arrival of Bantu-speaking agriculturalists in the Congo basin beginning around 1,000 BCE. Few central and southern African languages use non-Bantu terms for the oil palm, suggesting that the tree came with migrants, either carried by them or sharing the same ecological openings in the forest. As a tradition among Mfumte-speakers of northern Cameroon tells us, oil palms "follow men", growing in the wake of human activity. The interplay of climate and agriculture pushed the oil palm's frontier to the south and east, but progress was slow. Nineteenth century travelers reported only scattered groves around Lakes Kivu and Tanganyika, despite amenable environmental conditions. Tanzanians interviewed in the twentieth century clearly indicated that oil palms were recent arrivals, brought by people rather than by animals. Rather than serving as agents of deforestation-with oil palms the evidence of ecological vandalism-African farmers may in fact be responsible for afforestation in many places. Ethnographic research, coupled with historic aerial photography, showed that forests grew out of the moist, nutrient-rich soils left behind in the shade of abandoned village palm groves. Rejecting earlier classifications like "semi-wild" or "sub-spontaneous", geographer Case Watkins describes these palm groves as "emergent" phenomena. They are not purely human creations, but rather develop out of human interactions with a complex set of natural forces. These emergent groves often give way to other tree species, creating true forest where none had existed. As early as the 1920s, elders in Congo told a missionary that they and their ancestors were not "shifting cultivators" cutting out clearings in a forest: they had built the forest with their farming practices. At the time, few Europeans cared to listen. One colonial forester recalled how blinded he had been by stereotypes: "What I had in my inexperience looked upon as glorious virgin [forest] growth, dating from the Flood, quickly revealed itself to my better experienced and disappointed eye as nothing more than secondary growth of moderately good quality." With the help of local guides, seeing a landscape was "like reading a book", revealing human history in the environment. Across much of western and central Africa, forests have probably been advancing rather than retreating for the past 1,000 years or so, and this despite bouts of low rainfall. Far from marking humanity's destructive impact on forests, oil palms stand across Africa as a testament to the versatility, ingenuity, and sustainability of local farming practices.

== Textiles ==
=== Northern Africa ===
Egyptians wore linen from the flax plant, and used looms as early as 4000 BCE. Nubians mainly wore cotton, beaded leather, and linen. The Djellaba was made typically of wool and worn in the Maghreb.

=== West Africa and the Sahel ===
Valentim Fenandes, writing in the early sixteenth century on the basis of news received in Lisbon from early travellers, praised the high quality of Mandinka cotton cloth that was found all along the west coast of West Africa Such comments were repeated with regard to the cotton cloth of the "Slave Coast" and Benin as well, produced especially in centers in the Yoruba country. John Phillips, an English captain who sailed to the Slave Coast at the end of the seventeenth century, was particularly impressed with local cloth, some of which was purchased by the European traders and fetched high prices in the New World.

Some of the oldest surviving African textiles were discovered at the archaeological site of Kissi in northern Burkina Faso. They are made of wool or fine animal hair in a weft-faced plain weave pattern. Fragments of textile have also survived from the thirteenth century Benin City in Nigeria.

In the Sahel, cotton is widely used in making the boubou (for men) and kaftan (for women).

Bògòlanfini (mudcloth) is cotton textile dyed with fermented mud of tree sap and teas, hand made by the Bambara people of the Beledougou region of central Mali.

By the 12th century, so-called Moroccan leather, which actually came from the Hausa area of northern Nigeria, was supplied to Mediterranean markets and found their way to the fairs and markets of Europe

Kente was produced by the Akan people (Ashante, Fante, Enzema) and Ewe people in the countries of Togo, Ghana and Côte d'Ivoire.

During the 11th Century, the now vanished people of the Tellem (as they are called by the Dogon who inhabit the region from the 16th Century onwards) entered the area from the south, probably from the rain forest. From the 11th up to the 15th Century, the Tellem buried their dead in the remaining old granaries and in new buildings they built in the caves. The dead were buried with wooden headrests, bows, quivers, hoes, musical instruments, baskets, gourds, leather sandals, boots, bags, amulets, woolen and cotton blankets, coifs, tunics, and fiber aprons. These perishable objects found in a reasonably good state of preservation in the caves belong to the oldest objects that have been preserved from SubSaharan Africa. Archaeologists and textile experts who have analyzed the Tellem textiles assert found that they were of high quality and that no other region in the world has such a great variety of linear and geometrical patterns in cotton fabrics by means of a single color (the only one available: i.e. indigo). According to Rita Bolland, the Tellem designs have been the object of search for infinite combinations which have persisted to this day. To illustrate this search by Tellem weavers, Gerdes examines some patterns found on preserved fragments of tunics, sleeves, coifs and caps, woven in plain weave: i.e. the weave in which the horizontal and vertical threads cross each other one over, one under. According to Gerdes, the average width of the threads is 1 mm. The weavers alternated groups of natural white cotton threads with groups of blue, indigo-dyed, threads. From left to right, six vertical white threads are followed by four blue threads; from top to bottom, three horizontal white threads are followed by three blue threads. These yield a plane pattern. The basic rectangle has dimensions ten (=6+4) by six (=3+3), or (6+4) X (3+3). Gerdes adds that generally, the dimensions are (m+n) x (p+q), where m, n, p, and q are natural numbers. The Tellem weavers experimented with dimensions and found relationships between the dimensions and the (symmetry) properties of the patterns that resulted. In particular, the variation among the discovered plain weave fragments suggests that the weavers knew the effect on the patterns of the selection of even and odd dimensions, in addition to how these dimensions (m+n) and (p+q) are produced. The Tellem patterns from the 11th and 12th Centuries feature woven rectangles followed by fragments of respective plane patterns, which are two-color patterns in the sense that for each there is a rigid motion of the plane translation, rotation, reflection that reverses the blue and white colors. Furthermore, according to Gerdes, the Tellem weavers employed a variant of the plain weave, whereby in one direction double threads are used instead of single threads. In this way, the weavers were able to weave cloths with decorative and strip patterns. With woven cloth, the tailor could begin his/her work: drawing and cutting pieces; knotting, stitching and sewing them together; and decorating, for example, a tunic with a plaited band along the neck opening. Geometric knowledge is imperative in each of these activities. Decorative bands were plaited both with even and odd numbers of strings. Among the plaited bands discovered in the caves, there are on one hand bands made out of 4, 6, 8, and 14 strings, and, on the other hand, out of 5, 7, and 9 strings. The selection of an even or an odd number of strings and the weave, either plain or not, has implications for the visible decorative patterns. In addition, the Tellem weavers also produced blankets made of woolen.

=== Central Africa ===
Among Kuba people, in present-day Democratic Republic of Congo, raffia clothes were woven. They used the fibers of the leaves on the raffia palm tree.

Weaving with palm leaves was a highly developed art in Central Africa, and European travelers and missionaries compared woven palm-leaf cloth to the finest European-made silks. Filippo Pigafetta praised the "marvelous arte" of "making cloaths of sundry sortes, as Velvets shorne and unshorne, Sattens, Taffata, Damaskes, Sarcenettes and such like" in the eastern provinces and areas adjoining Kongo. Sarcenet was a fine silk, but, unlike that made in Europe, the type made in "this countrey and other places thereabouts" was "not of any silken stuffe" but "of the leaves of Palme trees." Indeed, the finest specimens were too "precious" for any but "the king, and such as it pleaseth him". Cavazzi wrote that the beaten leaves of one type of palm resulted in such fine, soft fibers that the weave of the cloth thus produced brought him to "astonishment". To produce such finely woven luxury cloth, the leaves had to be worked to a greater degree than the tying and laying required for thatching. Pigafetta noted that the process started with keeping the palms "under and lowe to the grounde, euery yeare cutting them, and watering them, to the ende they may grow smal and tender against the new spring". Once those "tender" leaves were "cleansed & purged after their manner," techniques that he did not further specify, "they drawe forth their threedes, which are all very fine and dainty, and all of one evennesses, saving that those which are longest, are best esteemed. For of those they weave their greatest peeces." Italian travellers of the late seventeenth and early eighteenth century did African cloth the considerable honor of comparing it with the best cloth produced in their own land, itself regarded as being among the best in Europe. Thus, Antonio Gradisca da Zucchelli (an Italian Capuchin priest) thought that the libongos (monetary cloth) he saw produced in Nsoyo, a coastal province of Kongo around 1705, "even though made of vile material like palm leaves", were "well worked and woven ... that it resembled velvet ... and is just as strong and durable."

John K. Thornton argues, using the reports of contemporary European travellers in Africa and the findings of archaeologists, that African textile manufacturing was far more advanced than has been recognized. Large quantities of textiles were produced. By the standards of the seventeenth or eighteenth century world, he concludes, African textile manufacturers were producing their goods at the same or higher levels of productivity as their European counterparts. For example, Leiden, one of the leading European centres of textile production which had almost the same population as Momboares in the eastern Congo, produced about 100,000 metres of cloth per year in the early seventeenth century, as compared to 400,000 metres in Momboares. Not only were these products traded widely within the continent by African merchants, as European merchants along the West African coast, African textiles were exported to the Caribbean and South America.

=== East Africa ===
Barkcloth was used by the Baganda in Uganda from the Mutuba tree (Ficus natalensis). Kanga are Swahili pieces of fabric that come in rectangular shapes, made of pure cotton, and put together to make clothing. It is as long as ones outstretch hand and wide to cover the length of ones neck. Kitenge are similar to kangas and kikoy, but are of a thicker cloth, and have an edging only on a long side. Kenya, Uganda, Tanzania, and Sudan are some of the African countries where kitenge are worn. In Malawi, Namibia and Zambia, kitenge are known as Chitenge. Lamba Mpanjaka was cloth made of multicolored silk, worn like a toga on the island of Madagascar.

Shemma, shama, and kuta are all cotton-based cloths used for making Ethiopian clothing. Three types of looms are used in Africa: the double heddle loom for narrow strips of cloth, the single heddle loom for wider spans of cloth, and the ground or pit loom. The double heddle loom and single heddle loom might be of African origin. The ground or pit loom is used in the Horn of Africa, Madagascar, and North Africa and is of Middle Eastern origins.

=== Southern Africa ===
In southern Africa one finds numerous use of animal hide and skins for clothing. The Ndau in central Mozambique and the Shona mixed hide with barkcloth and cotton cloth. Cotton weaving was practiced by the Ndau and Shona. Cotton cloth was referred to as machira. The Venda, Swazi, Basotho, Zulu, Ndebele, and Xhosa also made extensive use of hides. Hides came from cattle, sheep, goat, elephant, and from jangwa( part of the mongoose family). Leopard skins were coveted and was a symbol of kingship in Zulu society. Skins were tanned to form leather, dyed, and embedded with beads.

== Maritime technology ==
In 1987, the third oldest canoe in the world and the oldest in Africa, the Dufuna canoe, was discovered in Nigeria by Fulani herdsmen near the Yobe river and the village of Dufuna. It dates to approximately 8000 years ago, and was made from African mahogany.

=== Northern Africa and the Nile Valley ===
Carthage's fleet included large numbers of quadriremes and quinqueremes, warships with four and five ranks of rowers. Its ships dominated the Mediterranean. The Romans however were masters at copying and adapting the technology of other peoples. According to Polybius, the Romans seized a shipwrecked Carthaginian warship, and used it as a blueprint a massive naval build-up, adding their own refinement – the corvus – which allowed an enemy vessel to be "gripped" and boarded for hand-to-hand fighting. This negated initially superior Carthaginian seamanship and ships.

Early Egyptians knew how to assemble planks of wood into a ship hull as early as 3000 BC (5000 BCE). The oldest ships yet unearthed, a group of 14 discovered in Abydos, were constructed from wooden planks which were "sewn" together. Woven straps were used to lash the planks together, and reeds or grass stuffed between the planks helped to seal the seams. Because the ships are all buried together and near a mortuary complex belonging to Pharaoh Khasekhemwy, originally the boats were all thought to have belonged to him. One of the 14 ships dates to 3000 BCE, however, and is now thought to perhaps have belonged to an earlier pharaoh, possibly Pharaoh Aha.

Early Egyptians also knew how to assemble planks of wood with treenails to fasten them together, using pitch for caulking the seams. The "Khufu ship", a 43.6-meter vessel sealed into a pit in the Giza pyramid complex at the foot of the Great Pyramid of Giza in the Fourth Dynasty around 2500 BCE, is a full-size surviving example which may have fulfilled the symbolic function of a solar barque. Early Egyptians also knew how to fasten the planks of this ship together with mortise and tenon joints.

=== West Africa and the Sahel ===
A Nok sculpture portrays two individuals, along with their goods, in a dugout canoe. Both of the anthropomorphic figures in the watercraft are paddling. The Nok terracotta depiction of a dugout canoe may indicate that Nok people utilized dugout canoes to transport cargo, along tributaries (e.g., Gurara River) of the Niger River, and exchanged them in a regional trade network. The Nok terracotta depiction of a figure with a seashell on its head may indicate that the span of these riverine trade routes may have extended to the Atlantic Coast. In the maritime history of Africa, there is the earlier Dufuna canoe, which was constructed approximately 8000 years ago in the northern region of Nigeria; as the second earliest form of water vessel known in Sub-Saharan Africa, the Nok terracotta depiction of a dugout canoe was created in the central region of Nigeria during the first millennium BCE.

In the 14th century CE King Abubakari II, the brother of King Mansa Musa of the Mali Empire is thought to have had a great number of boats sitting on the coast of West Africa. The boats would communicate with each other by drums. Malian boats at this time were canoes of different sizes.

Numerous sources attest that the inland waterways of West Africa saw extensive use of war-canoes and vessels used for war transport where permitted by the environment. Most West African canoes were of single log construction, carved and dug-out from one massive tree trunk. The primary method of propulsion was by paddle and in shallow water, poles. Sails were also used to a lesser extent, particularly on trading vessels. The silk cotton tree provided many of the most table logs for massive canoe building, and launching was via wooden rollers to the water. Boat building specialists were to emerge among certain peoples, particularly in the Niger Delta.

Some canoes were 80 feet (24 m) in length, carrying 100 men or more. Documents from 1506 for example, refer to war-canoes on the Sierra Leone river, carrying 120 men. Others refer to Guinea coast peoples using canoes of varying sizes – some 70 feet (21 m) in length, 7–8 feet (2.1–2.4 m) broad, with sharp pointed ends, rowing benches on the side, and quarter decks or focastles build of reeds, and miscellaneous facilities such as cooking hearths, and storage spaces for crew sleeping mats.

The engineering and methodology (e.g., cultural valuations, use of iron tools) used in the construction of West African dugout canoes (e.g., rounded point sterns and pointed bows with 15° - 50° angle above water surface, increased stability via partly rounded or flat base, v-shaped hull, shallow draft for sailing water depths less than one foot, occasionally spanning more than one hundred feet in length) contributed to the capability of the canoes to be able to persist and navigate throughout the interconnected river system that connected the Benue River, Gambia River, Niger River, and Senegal River as well as Lake Chad; this river system connected diverse sources of water (e.g., lakes, rivers, seas, streams) and ecological zones (e.g., Sahara, Sahel, Savanna), and allowed for the transport of people, information, and economic goods along riverine trade networks that connect various locations (e.g., Bamako, Djenne, Gao, Mopti, Segou, Timbuktu) throughout West Africa and North Africa. The knowledge and understanding (e.g., hydrography, marine geography, how canoe navigation is affected by the depth of the water, tides in the ocean, currents, and winds) of West African canoers facilitated the skillful navigation of various channels of the regional river system, while engaging in activities such as trade and fishing. The construction schema for West African dugout canoes were also used among canoes in the Americas constructed by the African diaspora. The sacredness of canoe-making is expressed in a proverb from Senegambia: "The blood of kings and the tears of the canoe-maker are sacred things which must not touch the ground." In addition to possessing economic value, West African dugout canoes also possessed a sociocultural and psychospiritual value.

In 1735 CE, John Atkins observed: "Canoos are what used through the whole Coast for transporting Men and Goods." European rowboats, which frequently capsized, were able to be outmaneuvered and outperformed in terms of speed by West African dugout canoes. Barbot stated, regarding West African canoers and West African dugout canoes, the "speed with which these people generally make these boats travel is beyond belief". Alvise da Cadamosto also observed how "effortlessly" Portuguese caravels were outperformed by Gambian dugout canoes. The skill of Kru canoers to be able to navigate the challenging conditions of the sea was also observed by Charles Thomas.

Amid the 1590s CE, Komenda and Takoradi in Ghana served as production areas for dugout canoes made by the Ahanta people. By 1679 CE, Barbot observed Takoradi to be "a major canoe-producing center, crafting dugouts capable of carrying up to eight tons". Between the 17th century CE and 18th century CE, a production area and/or marketplace of dugout canoes was in Shama, which later became only a marketplace on Supome Island. Amid the 1660s CE, in addition to other local canoers manufacturing dugout canoes, the Fetu people were observed by Muller as having bought dugout canoes that were made by the Ahanta people.

West Africans (e.g., Ghana, Ivory Coast, Liberia, Senegal) and western Central Africans (e.g., Cameroon) independently developed the skill of surfing. Amid the 1640s CE, Michael Hemmersam provided an account of surfing in the Gold Coast: "the parents 'tie their children to boards and throw them into the water.'" In 1679 CE, Barbot provided an account of surfing among Elmina children in Ghana: "children at Elmina learned "to swim, on bits of boards, or small bundles of rushes, fasten'd under their stomachs, which is a good diversion to the spectators." James Alexander provided an account of surfing in Accra, Ghana in 1834 CE: "From the beach, meanwhile, might be seen boys swimming into the sea, with light boards under their stomachs. They waited for a surf; and came rolling like a cloud on top of it. But I was told that sharks occasionally dart in behind the rocks and 'yam' them." Thomas Hutchinson provided an account of surfing in southern Cameroon in 1861: "Fishermen rode small dugouts 'no more than six feet in length, fourteen to sixteen inches in width, and from four to six inches in depth.'"

=== East Africa ===
It is known that ancient Axum traded with India, and there is evidence that ships from Northeast Africa may have sailed back and forth between India/Sri Lanka and Nubia trading goods and even to Persia, Himyar and Rome. Aksum was known by the Greeks for having seaports for ships from Greece and Yemen. Elsewhere in Northeast Africa, the 1st century CE Greek travelogue Periplus of the Red Sea reports that Somalis, through their northern ports such as Zeila and Berbera, were trading frankincense and other items with the inhabitants of the Arabian Peninsula as well as with the then Roman-controlled Egypt.

Middle Age Swahili kingdoms are known to have had trade port islands and trade routes with the Islamic world and Asia and were described by Greek historians are "metropolises". Famous African trade ports such as Mombasa, Zanzibar, Mogadishu and Kilwa were known to Chinese sailors such as Zheng He and medieval Islamic historians such as the Berber Islamic voyager Abu Abdullah ibn Battuta. The dhow was the ship of trade used by the Swahili. They could be massive. It was a dhow that transported a giraffe to Chinese Emperor Yong Le's court, in 1414.

Few kingdoms south of the Sahara possessed a more developed naval organization than that of Buganda, which dominated Lake Victoria with its navy of up to 20,000 men and war canoes as long as seventy two feet....

== Architecture ==
=== West Africa ===
The Walls of Benin City are collectively the world's largest man-made structure and were semi-destroyed by the British in 1897. Fred Pearce wrote in New Scientist:

They extend for some 16,000 kilometres in all, in a mosaic of more than 500 interconnected settlement boundaries. They cover 6500 square kilometres and were all dug by the Edo people. In all, they are four times longer than the Great Wall of China, and consumed a hundred times more material than the Great Pyramid of Cheops. They took an estimated 150 million hours of digging to construct, and are perhaps the largest single archaeological phenomenon on the planet.

Sungbo's Eredo is the second largest pre-colonial monument in Africa, larger than the Great Pyramids or Great Zimbabwe. Built by the Yoruba people in honour of one of their titled personages, an aristocratic widow known as the Oloye Bilikisu Sungbo, it is made up of sprawling rammed earth walls and the valleys that surrounded the town of Ijebu-Ode in Ogun state, Nigeria.

Tichit is the oldest surviving archaeological settlements in the Sahel and is the oldest all-stone settlement south of the Sahara. It is thought to have been built by Soninke people and is thought to be the precursor of the Ghana empire.

The Great Mosque of Djenné is the largest mud brick or adobe building in the world and is considered by many architects to be the greatest achievement of the Sudano-Sahelian architectural style, albeit with definite Islamic influences.

=== Northern Africa and the Nile Valley ===
Around 1000 CE, cob (tabya) first appears in the Maghreb and al-Andalus.

The Egyptian step pyramid built at Saqqara is the oldest major stone building in the world.

The Great Pyramid was the tallest man-made structure in the world for over 3,800 years.

The earliest style of Nubian architecture included the speos, structures carved out of solid rock, an A-Group (3700–3250 BCE) achievement. Egyptians made extensive use of the process at Speos Artemidos and Abu Simbel.

Sudan, site of ancient Nubia, has more pyramids than anywhere in the world, even more than Egypt, with 223 pyramids

Around 1100, the ventilator is invented in Egypt.

=== East Africa ===
Aksumites built in stone. Monolithic stelae on top of the graves of kings like King Ezana's Stele. Later, during the Zagwe dynasty Churches carved out of solid rocks like Church of Saint George at Lalibela.

Thimlich Ohinga, a World Heritage Site is a complex of stone-built ruins located in Kenya.

=== Southern Africa ===
In southern Africa one finds ancient and widespread traditions of building in stone. Two broad categories of these traditions have been noted: 1. Zimbabwean style 2. Transvaal Free State style. North of the Zambezi one finds very few stone ruins. Great Zimbabwe, Khami, and Thulamela uses the Zimbabwean style. Tsotho/Tswana architecture represents the Transvaal Free State style. ||Khauxa!nas stone settlement in Namibia represents both traditions. The Kingdom of Mapungubwe (1075–1220) was a pre-colonial Southern African state located at the confluence of the Shashe and Limpopo rivers which marked the center of a pre-Shona kingdom which preceded the culmination of southeast African urban civilization in Great Zimbabwe.

The tswana lived in City states with stone walls and complex sociopolitical structures that they built in the 1300s or earlier. These cities had a populations of up to 20,000 people which at the time, rivalled Cape Town in size.

== Communication systems ==
Griots are repositories of African history, especially in African societies with no written language. Griots can recite genealogies going back centuries. They recite epics that reveal historical occurrences and events. Griots can go for hours and even days reciting the histories and genealogies of societies. They have been described as living history books.

=== Northern Africa and the Nile Valley ===
Africa's first writing system and the beginning of the alphabet was Egyptian hieroglyphs. Two scripts have been the direct offspring of Egyptian hieroglyphs, the Proto-Sinaitic script and the Meroitic alphabet. Out of Proto-Sinaitic came the South Arabian alphabet and Phoenician alphabet, out of which the Aramaic alphabet, Greek alphabet, the Brāhmī script, Arabic alphabet were directly or indirectly derived.

Out of the South Arabian alphabet came the Ge'ez alphabet which is used to write Blin(cushitic), Amharic, Tigre, and Tigrinya in Ethiopia and Eritrea.

Out the Phoenician Alphabet came tifinagh, the berber alphabet mainly used by the Tuaregs.

The other direct offspring of Egyptian hieroglyphs was the Meroitic alphabet. It began in the Napatan phase of Nubian history, Kush (700–300 BCE). It came into full fruition in the 2nd century, under the successor Nubian kingdom of Meroë. The script can be read but not understood, with the discovery at el-Hassa, Sudan of ram statues bearing meroitic inscriptions might assist in its translation.

=== The Sahel ===
With the arrival of Islam came the Arabic alphabet in the Sahel. Arabic writing is widespread in the Sahel. The Arabic script was also used to write native African languages. The script used in this capacity is often called Ajami. The languages that have been or are written in Ajami include Hausa, Mandinka, Fulani, Wolofal, Tamazight, Nubian, Yoruba, Songhai, and Kanuri.

=== West Africa ===
N'Ko script developed by Solomana Kante in 1949 as a writing system for the Mande languages of West Africa. It is used in Guinea, Côte d'Ivoire, Mali, and neighboring countries by a number of speakers of Manding languages.

Nsibidi is ideographic set of symbols developed by the Ekoi people of Southeastern coastal Nigeria for communication. A complex implementation of Nsibidi is only known to initiates of Ekpe secret society.

Adinkra is a set of symbols developed by the Akan people (Ghana and Côte d'Ivoire), used to represent concepts and aphorisms.

The Vai syllabary is a syllabic writing system devised for the Vai language by Mɔmɔlu Duwalu Bukɛlɛ in Liberia during the 1830s.

Adamorobe Sign Language is an indigenous sign language developed in the Adamorobe Akan village in Eastern Ghana. The village has a high incident of genetic deafness.

Usman dan Fodio accomplished a great feat in raising the literacy rate of the people of the Sokoto Caliphate in only a few decades. Multiple independent historical surveys have estimated the male literacy rate to have stayed at about 96-97% and the female literacy rate remained between 93%-95% by the death of the Shehu. The female literacy rate of Sokoto in 1812 was higher than women in the United Kingdom and the United States. The British traveler Col. Runciman reported in awe that the people of Sokoto "were literate not to a man, but to a woman".

=== Central Africa ===
Across eastern Angola and northwestern Zambia, sona ideographs were used as mnemonic devices to record knowledge and culture. Gerhard Kubik explains the various aspects of sona that indicate space and time concepts as circular, multidirectional, and multidimensional. For instance, in terms of directionality of drawing, the sona is performed from left to right, from bottom to top (on a wall), or from close to the body to far. This mirrors the process of the line, which in the theory of the Eulerian path returns to the beginning. Furthermore, Kubik describes sona as being synaesthetic, with visuality and aurality paired in the dot and line structure of the drawings. He concludes, remarkably, that "[the evidence of inherent patterns] shows that the African discovery, unparalleled in any other culture in the world, of how to make use of the reactions of the human perceptual apparatus by deliberately creating configurations which must decompose' and reconstitute as 'inherent patterns,' encompasses both the aural and the visual m realm." Thus sona is a well-established mediating system, or apparatus, that coded "deterritorialized flows" through writing, speech, voice, sound instruments, and (masquerade) costumes. Bárbaro Martínez Ruiz writes of a broad practice of this type of writing in Central Africa and the Cuban diaspora, especially through the Bakongo people. He argues that writing includes performance, objects, rhythms, gestures, and even food identifiers. Sona demonstrates that even in so-called unmediated practices, language operates as protocol that negotiates power relationships and intimate acts of colonization. That is, sona is a code, based on a binary code much like computerized information processing, that does something in addition to saying something. Simon Battestini details the various ways that the term writing can be analyzed in Africa, what he distills as all "encoded traces of a text". In other definitions, writing is seized thought, which yet preserves its noetic-poetic and heterogeneous modes of communication."Sona has been compared to computing because of its recursive logic of both visual patterning and its framing of social dynamics. It resists any medium that has been designed to decouple information from communication, whether the book or the computer".

Lukasa memory boards were also used among the BaLuba.

Talking drums exploit the tonal aspect of many African languages to convey very complicated messages. Talking drums can send messages 25 to 40 kilometres (15 to 25 mi). Bulu, a Bantu language, can be drummed as well as spoken. In a Bulu village, each individual had a unique drum signature. A message could be sent to an individual by drumming his drum signature. It has been noted that a message can be sent 160 kilometres (100 mi) from village to village within two hours or less using a talking drum.

=== East Africa ===
On the Swahili coast, the Swahili language was written in Arabic script, as was the Malagasy language in Madagascar.

The people of Uganda developed a form of writing based on a floral code and the use of talking drums was widespread as well.

It is especially interesting that the form of writing that developed in Bunyoro was based on a floral code, as the absence of both writing and flowers in African culture have been used by Jack Goody as evidence of African culture's separateness from that of "Eurasia." Goody has written that African peoples generally did not make significant use of flowers in worship, gift-giving or decoration. He does "not know of any indigenous use of odours", nor of plants playing a role in stories or myths. This is thought to be because of Africa's "simple" agriculture, "non-complex" societies and absence of a "culture of luxury". This description of African life does not fit well with what we know of precolonial Bunyoro, a large, relatively ancient, and extremely hierarchical kingdom, and the analysis of the role of flowers was quite inaccurate.

— Shane Doyle, The Language of Flowers: Knowledge, Power and Ecology in Precolonial Bunyoro

The ancient court music composers of Buganda discovered how human auditory perception processes a complex sequence of rapid, irregular sound impulses by splitting the total image into perceptible units at different pitch levels. They had made use of their discovery in composition, creating indirectly polyphonies of interweaving melodic lines that would suggest words to a Luganda speaker, as if some spirit were talking to the performers of a xylopnone or to the lone player of a harp (ennanga). The combination of the first two Xylophone parts creates 'illusory' melodic patterns that exist only in the observers mind, not actually played by either of the first two musicians directly. That these 'resultant' or 'inherent' patterns are materialised only in the minds of listeners is a remarkable feature of Bugandan music. It is probably the oldest example of an audio-psychological effect known as auditory streaming (first recognized in western literature as the melodic fission effect) to delliberately occur in music. The music would be produced by regular movement, with the fingers or sticks combining two interlocking tone-rows, but the patterns heard would be irregular, often asymmetric and complex. All the 102 xylophone compositions that were transcribed by Gerhard Kubik In Buganda during the early 1960s reveal an extremely complex structure, and they "fall apart' in perception-generated innerent melodlc-rhythmic patterns. No one, so far, has Succeeded in composing a new piece that would match in quality and complexity those compositions handed down for generations. Some of them can even be dated by correlating the accompanying song texts with the reign of past kings.

The Agikuyu of Kenya used a Mnemonic-pictographic device they called Gicandi to record and spread knowledge. This kind of memory device uses a pictorial symbolism which proceeds by simplified pictures, tracing only part of an object or a conventional image. A small number of pictures is sufficient to record a happening, suggest to a medicine-man the formula for magical practices and to a singer the object and verses of his song. A kikuyu was also able to follow the history of his herd by notches on a stick. A certain notch on a stick that identified a specific cow would signify insemination; another notch would record the birth of the calf and by such records the cattle breeder was able to estimate the amount of milk from his herd. It is noteworthy that the word for letters or numerals in Kikuyu is ndemwa, which translates to those that have been cut. Father Cangolo of the consolata fathers who lived among the Kikuyu in the 1930s recorded that:

Recently an old Kikuyu took to a public meeting a wooden stick on which he was able to read the amount of tax paid by him to government on each year since it began being collected.

— C. Cagnolo, The Akikuyu, Their Customs, Traditions and Folklore

== Transportation technologies ==
=== North Africa ===
Since the 5th Dynasty, awareness of the wheel may have been in ancient Egypt.

During the 13th Dynasty, the earliest wheeled transport emerged in ancient Egypt.

The potter's wheel was introduced into ancient Nubia by ancient Egypt. The wheelhead of a potter's wheel, which was made of clay and dated to 1850 BCE, was found at Askut.

Since the Meroe period, ox-powered water wheels, specifically saqiya, and shaduf were used in Nubia.

Between 3200 BP and 1000 BP, various Central Saharan rock art sites from the Horse Period were created depicting charioteers, mostly upon horse-driven chariots and rarely upon cattle-driven chariots; these painted and engraved depictions were distributed in 81 painted and 120 engraved depictions in Algeria, 18 painted and 44 engraved depictions in Libya, 6 engraved depictions in Mali, 125 engraved depictions in Mauritania, 96 engraved depictions in Morocco, 29 engraved depictions in Niger, and 21 engraved depictions in Western Sahara, and were likely created by the Garamantes, whose ancestors were ancient Berbers and Saharan pastoralists. Rock art engravings of ox-drawn wagons and horse-driven chariots can be found in Algeria, Libya, southern Morocco, Mauritania, and Niger.

In the 5th century BCE, Herodotus reported use of chariots by Garamantes in the Saharan region of North Africa.

By the 4th century BCE, the water wheel, particularly the noria and sakia, was created in ancient Egypt.

In the 1st century CE, Strabo reported use of chariots by Nigretes and Pharusii in the Saharan region of North Africa.

=== West Africa ===
Between 3200 BP and 1000 BP, various Central Saharan rock art sites from the Horse Period were created depicting charioteers, mostly upon horse-driven chariots and rarely upon cattle-driven chariots; these painted and engraved depictions were distributed in 81 painted and 120 engraved depictions in Algeria, 18 painted and 44 engraved depictions in Libya, 6 engraved depictions in Mali, 125 engraved depictions in Mauritania, 96 engraved depictions in Morocco, 29 engraved depictions in Niger, and 21 engraved depictions in Western Sahara, and were likely created by the Garamantes, whose ancestors were ancient Berbers and Saharan pastoralists. Rock art engravings of ox-drawn wagons and horse-driven chariots can be found in Algeria, Libya, southern Morocco, Mauritania, and Niger.

At Dhar Tichitt, there is Neolithic rock art that depicts a human figure with a link in their hand, connecting him to yoked oxen that are pulling a cart. At Dhar Walata, there is Neolithic rock art that depicts a human figure in relation to an ox cart.

At Bled Initi, which is a hamlet near Akreijit, there are two depictions of ox carts that have been estimated to date between 650 BCE and 380 BCE, and are consistent with the artistic style of other aspects of the Dhar Tichitt Early Iconographic Tradition.

At Tondia, in Niger, rock art portrays an ox cart; the use of the ox cart in Saharan West Africa may have begun to decline in use as transport by camel increased between the 4th century CE and the medieval period.

In 1670 CE, the king of Allada was gifted a gilded carriage, along with a horse bit and horse harness, by the French West India Company.

In 1772 CE, a European account reported the observed use of two coaches in a procession, which were carried by twelve men each as part of a ceremony in the kingdom of Dahomey, at Abomey.

Between 1789 CE and 1797 CE, king Agonglo of Dahomey owned a carriage, which was still intact during the 1870s CE.

Throughout the 19th century CE, numerous Europeans accounts reported the observed use of many wheeled transports, including carriages, which were part of ceremonial processions in the kingdom of Dahomey.

In 1824 CE, the king of Lagos gifted a large-sized carriage to the emperor of Brazil.

During the 1840s CE, king Eyamba V of Old Calabar acquired two horse-drawn carriages.

In 1841 CE, Asantehene Kwaku Dua I was gifted a carriage by the Methodist Missionary Society.

In 1845 CE, the kingdom of Dahomey used a cart against Badagry, resulting in it later being seized.

In 1850 CE, a European account in the kingdom of Dahomey detailed: "'a glass-coach, the handiwork of Hoo-ton-gee, a native artist-a square with four large windows, on wheels', and also ' ... [a] wheeled-chair with a huge bird before it, on wheels of Dahomey make ... [a] warrior on wheels, Dahomey make, ... [and a] Dahoman-made chair on wheels, covered with handsome country cloth'."

In 1864 CE, a European account detailed Dahomey carriages "'of home, or native manufacture', including 'a blue-green shandridan, with two short flagstaffs attached to the front'."

In 1866 CE, a European account reported the observed use of a carriage in a procession, which was part of a ceremony in the kingdom of Borno, at Kukawa.

In 1870 CE, a European account reported the observed use of a mule-drawn carriage in a ceremonial procession, which was gifted to the Shehu of Borno by British explorers in 1851 CE, at Kukawa.

In 1871 CE, a European account in the kingdom of Dahomey detailed: "'a dark green coach, evidently of native manufacture'."

=== Southern Africa ===
At Tsodilo Hills, in Botswana, white painted rock art may depict a wagon and wagon wheel, which may date after, or even considerably after, the 1st millennium CE.

== Warfare ==
Most of tropical Africa did not have a cavalry. Horses would be wiped out by tse-tse fly and it was not possible to domesticate the zebra. The army of tropical Africa consisted of mainly infantry. Weapons included bows and arrows with low bow strength that compensated with poison-tipped arrows. Throwing knives were made use of in central Africa, spears that could double as thrusting cutting weapons, and swords were also in use. Heavy clubs when thrown could break bones, battle axe, and shields of various sizes were in widespread use. Later guns, muskets such as flintlock, wheelock, and matchlock. Contrary to popular perception, guns were also in widespread use in Africa. They typically were of poor quality, a policy of European nations to provide poor quality merchandise. One reason the slave trade was so successful was the widespread use of guns in Africa.

=== West Africa ===
Fortification was a major part of defense, integral to warfare. Massive earthworks were built around cities and settlements in West Africa, typically defended by soldiers with bow and poison-tipped arrows. The earthworks are some of the largest man made structures in Africa and the world such as the walls of Benin and Sungbo's Eredo. In Central Africa, the Angola region, one find preference for ditches, which were more successful for defense against wars with Europeans.

African infantry did not just include men. The state of Dahomey included all-female units, the so-called Dahomey Amazons, who were personal bodyguards of the king. The Queen Mother of Benin had her own personal army, 'The Queen's Own.'

Biologicals were extensively used in many parts of Africa, most of the time in the form of poisoned arrows, but also powder spread on the war front or in the form of the poisoning of horses and water supply of the opponents. In Borgu, there were specific mixtures to kill, for hypnosis, to make the enemy bold, and to act as an antidote against the enemies' poison. A specific class of medicine-men was responsible for the making of the biologicals. In South Sudan, the people of the Koalit Hills kept their country free of Arab invasions by using tsetse flies as a weapon of war. Several accounts can give us an idea of the efficiency of the biologicals. For example, Mockley-Ferryman in 1892 commented on the Dahomean invasion of Borgu, that "their (Borgawa) poisoned arrows enabled them to hold their own with the forces of Dahomey notwithstanding the latter's muskets." The same scenario happened to Portuguese raiders in Senegambia when they were defeated by Mali's Gambian forces, and to John Hawkins in Sierra Leone where he lost a number of his men to poisoned arrows.

=== Northern Africa, Nile Valley, and the Sahel ===
Ancient Egyptian weaponry includes bows and arrow, maces, clubs, scimitars, swords, shields, and knives. Body armor was made of bands of leathers and sometimes laid with scales of copper. Horse-drawn chariots were used to deliver archers into the battle field. Weapons were initially made with stone, wood, and copper, later bronze, and later iron.

In 1260, the first portable hand cannons (midfa) loaded with explosive gunpowder, the first example of a handgun and portable firearm, were used by the Egyptians to repel the Mongols at the Battle of Ain Jalut. The cannons had an explosive gunpowder composition almost identical to the ideal compositions for modern explosive gunpowder. They were also the first to use dissolved talc for fire protection, and they wore fireproof clothing, to which Gunpowder cartridges were attached.

Aksumite weapons were mainly made of iron: iron spears, iron swords, and iron knives called poniards. Shields were made of buffalo hide. In the latter part of the 19th century, Ethiopia made a concerted effort to modernize its army. She acquired repeating rifles, artillery, and machine guns. This modernization facilitated the Ethiopian victory over the Italians at the Tigray town of Adwa in the 1896 Battle of Adwa. Ethiopia was one of the few African countries to use artillery in colonial wars.

There are also a breastplate armor made of the horny back plates of crocodile from Egypt, which was given to the Pitt Rivers Museum as part of the archaeological Founding Collection in 1884.

The first use of cannons as siege machine at the siege of Sijilmasa in 1274, according to 14th-century historian Ibn Khaldun.

The Sahelian military consisted of cavalry and infantry. Cavalry consisted of shielded, mounted soldiers. Body armor was chain mail or heavy quilted cotton. Helmets were made of leather, elephant, or hippo hide. Imported horses were shielded. Horse armor consisted of quilted cotton packed with kapok fiber and copper face plate. The stirrups could be used as weapon to disembowel enemy infantry or mounted soldiers at close range. Weapons included the sword, lance, battle-axe, and broad-bladed spear. The infantry were armed with bow and iron tipped arrows. Iron tips were usually laced with poison, from the West African plant Strophantus hispidus. Quivers of 40–50 arrows would be carried into battle. Later, muskets were introduced.

=== Southern Africa ===
The numerous irregular conflicts in the region during the 1800s saw the emergence of the Afrikaner "kommando" system of mounted mobile light infantry called up from the male population. These would see extensive action during the Xhosa Wars and the First and Second Boer Wars and became the origin of the modern commando elite light infantry type.

From the 1960s to the 1980s, South Africa pursued research into weapons of mass destruction, including nuclear, biological, and chemical weapons. Six nuclear weapons were assembled. With the anticipated changeover to a majority-elected government in the 1990s, the South African government dismantled all of its nuclear weapons, the first nation in the world which voluntarily gave up nuclear arms it had developed itself.

== Commerce ==
Numerous metal objects and other items were used as currency in Africa. They are as follows: cowrie shells, salt, gold (dust or solid), copper, ingots, iron chains, tips of iron spears, iron knives, cloth in various shapes (square, rolled, etc.). Copper was as valuable as gold in Africa. Copper was not as widespread and more difficult to acquire, except in Central Africa, than gold. Other valuable metals included lead and tin. Salt was also as valuable as gold. Because of its scarcity, it was used as currency.

=== Northern Africa and the Nile Valley ===
Carthage imported gold, copper, ivory, and slaves from tropical Africa. Carthage exported salt, cloth, metal goods. Before camels were used in the trans-Saharan trade pack animals, oxen, donkeys, mules, and horses were utilized. Extensive use of camels began in the 1st century CE. Carthage minted gold, silver, bronze, and electrum(mix gold and silver) coins mainly for fighting wars with Greeks and Romans. Most of their fighting force were mercenaries, who had to be paid.

Islamic North Africa made use of the Almoravid dinar and Fatimid dinar, gold coins. The Almoravid dinar and the Fatimid dinar were printed on gold from the Sahelian empires. The ducat of Genoa and Venice and the florine of Florence were also printed on gold from the Sahelian empires.

Ancient Egypt imported ivory, gold, incense, hardwood, and ostrich feather.

Nubia exported gold, cotton/cotton cloth, ostrich feathers, leopard skins, ivory, ebony, and iron/iron weapons.

=== West Africa and the Sahel ===
Cowries have been used as currency in West Africa since the 11th century when their use was first recorded near Old Ghana. Its use may have been much older. Sijilmasa in present-day Morocco seems to be a major source of cowries in the trans-Saharan trade. In western Africa, shell money was usual tender up until the middle of the 19th century. Before the abolition of the slave trade there were large shipments of cowry shells to some of the English ports for reshipment to the slave coast. It was also common in West Central Africa as the currency of the Kingdom of Kongo called locally nzimbu. As the value of the cowry was much greater in West Africa than in the regions from which the supply was obtained, the trade was extremely lucrative. In some cases the gains are said to have been 500%. The use of the cowry currency gradually spread inland in Africa. By about 1850 Heinrich Barth found it fairly widespread in Kano, Kuka, Gando, and even Timbuktu. Barth relates that in Muniyoma, one of the ancient divisions of Bornu, the king's revenue was estimated at 30,000,000 shells, with every adult male being required to pay annually 1000 shells for himself, 1000 for every pack-ox, and 2000 for every slave in his possession. In the countries on the coast, the shells were fastened together in strings of 40 or 100 each, so that fifty or twenty strings represented a dollar; but in the interior, they were laboriously counted one by one, or, if the trader were expert, five by five. The districts mentioned above received their supply of kurdi, as they were called, from the west coast; but the regions to the north of Unyamwezi, where they were in use under the name of simbi, were dependent on Muslim traders from Zanzibar. The shells were used in the remoter parts of Africa until the early 20th century but gave way to modern currencies. The shell of the land snail, Achatina monetaria, cut into circles with an open center was also used as coin in Benguella, Portuguese West Africa.

The Ghana Empire, Mali Empire, and Songhay Empire were major exporters of gold, iron, tin, slaves, spears, javelin, arrows, bows, whips of hippo hide. They imported salt, horses, wheat, raisins, cowries, dates, copper, henna, olives, tanned hides, silk, cloth, brocade, Venetian pearls, mirrors, and tobacco. All these empires massively influenced world economics since they controlled 80% of the worlds gold that Europe and the Islamic world depended on (gold from the Mali Empire was the main source for the manufacture of coins in the Muslim world and Europe). European states even took loans from African states as the gold from west Africa funded the trade imbalance with the east for spices.

Some of the currencies used in the Sahel included paper debt or IOU's for long-distance trade, gold coins, and the mitkal (gold dust) currency. Gold dust that weighed 4.6 grams was equivalent to 500 or 3,000 cowries. Square cloth, four spans on each side, called chigguiya was used around the Senegal River.

In Kanem cloth was the major currency. A cloth currency called dandi was also in widespread use.

The Akan used goldweight that they called "Sika-yôbwê"(stone of gold) as their currency. They used a system of computing weight consisting of 11 units. The value of the weight were also numerically represented using two signs.

=== East Africa ===
Aksum exported ivory, glass crystal, brass, copper, myrrh, and frankincense. The Aksumites imported silver, gold, olive oil, and wine. The Aksumites produced coins around 270 CE, under the rule of King Endybis. Aksumite coins were issued in gold, silver, and bronze.

The Swahili served as middlemen. They connected African goods to Asian markets and Asian goods to African markets. Their most in demand export was Ivory. They exported ambergris, gold, leopard skins, slaves, and tortoise shell. They imported pottery and glassware from Asia. They also manufactured items such as cotton, glass and shell beads. Imports and locally manufactured goods were used as trade to acquire African goods. Trade links included the Arabian Peninsula, Persia, India, and China. The Swahili also minted silver and copper coins.

== Glass manufacturing ==
=== West Africa ===
Igbo Olokun, also known as Olokun Grove, may be one of the earliest workshops for producing glass in West Africa. Glass production may have begun during, if not before, the 11th century. The 11th–15th century were the peak of glass production. High lime, high alumina (HLHA) and low lime, high alumina (LLHA) glass are distinct compositions that were developed using locally sourced recipes, raw materials, and pyrotechnology. The presence of HLHA glass beads discovered throughout West Africa (e.g., Igbo-Ukwu in southern Nigeria, Gao and Essouk in Mali, and Kissi in Burkina Faso), after the ninth century CE, reveals the broader importance of this glass industry in the region and shows its participation in regional trade networks (e.g., trans-Saharan trade, trans-Atlantic trade). Glass beads served as "the currency for negotiating political power, economic relations, and cultural/spiritual values" for "Yoruba, West Africans, and the African diaspora."

== Science and traditional worldviews ==
Bandama and Babalola (2023) states:

The view of science as "embedded practice", intimately connected with ritual, for example, is considered "ascientific", "pseudo-science", or "magic" in Western perspective. In Africa, there is a strong connection between the physical and the terrestrial worlds. The deities and gods are the emissaries of the supreme God and the patrons in charge of the workability of the processes involved. In the Ile-Ife pantheon, for example, Olokun—the goddess of wealth—is considered the patron of the glass industry and is therefore consulted. Sacrifices are offered to appease her for a successful run. The same is true for ironworking. Current scholarship has reinforced the contributions of ancient Africa to the global history of science and technology.

== Recent scientific research ==
Ahmed Zewail, won the 1999 Nobel Prize in chemistry for his work in femtochemistry, methods that allow the description of change states in femtoseconds or very short seconds.

The Democratic Republic of the Congo has a rocketry program called Troposphere.

Currently, forty percent of African-born scientists live in OCED countries, predominantly NATO and EU countries. This has been described as an African brain drain.

Sub-Saharan African countries spent on average 0.3% of their GDP on S&T (Science and Technology) in 2007. This represents a combined increase from US$1.8bn in 2002 to US$2.8bn in 2007. North African countries spend a comparative 0.4% of GDP on research, an increase from US$2.6bn in 2002 to US$3.3bn in 2007. Exempting South Africa, the continent has augmented its collective science funding by about 50% in the last decade. Notably outstripping its neighbor states, South Africa spends 0.87% of GDP on science and technology research. Although technology parks have a long history in the US and Europe, their presence across Africa is still limited, as the continent currently lags behind other regions of the world in terms of funding technological development and innovation. Only seven countries (Morocco, Botswana, Egypt, Senegal, Madagascar, Tunisia and South Africa) have made technology park construction an integral piece of their development goals.

== Africa in Science (AiS) ==
Africa in Science (AiS) is an online data aggregator site and ThinkTank founded in January 2021 by Aymen Idris, who currently serves as chairman. The focus of AiS ThinkTank is on scientometric analysis of science in Africa, and the main aim of the website is to monitor and display metrics such as AiS Index (AiSi) and AiS Badge that estimate and visualize the research output of research Institutes and universities in a specific country in Africa, and their web site.

== Science and technology by region ==
=== North Africa ===
- Science and technology in Morocco

=== West Africa ===
- Science and technology in Cabo Verde

=== East Africa ===
- Science and technology in Malawi
- Science and technology in Tanzania
- Science and technology in Uganda
- Science and technology in Zimbabwe

=== Southern Africa ===
- Science and technology in Botswana
- Science and technology in South Africa

== See also ==
- Ancient Egyptian technology
- History of Space in Africa
- Maritime history of Somalia
- Timeline of Islamic science and technology
- Science in medieval Islam
- Science in Asia
- Science in Europe
