= Geometry From Africa =

1999 book in ethnomathematics

Geometry From Africa: Mathematical and Educational Explorations
- Author: Paulus Gerdes
- Language: English
- Series: Classroom Resource Materials
- Subject: Mathematics in African cultures
- Publisher: Mathematical Association of America
- Publication date: 1999
- Pages: 210
- ISBN: 9780883857151

Geometry From Africa: Mathematical and Educational Explorations is a book in ethnomathematics by Paulus Gerdes. It analyzes the mathematics behind geometric designs and patterns from multiple African cultures, and suggests ways of connecting this analysis with the mathematics curriculum. It was published in 1999 by the Mathematical Association of America, in their Classroom Resource Materials book series.

== Background ==
The book's author, Paulus Gerdes (1952–2014), was a mathematician from the Netherlands who became a professor of mathematics at the Eduardo Mondlane University in Mozambique, rector of Maputo University, and chair of the African Mathematical Union Commission on the History of Mathematics in Africa. He was a prolific author, especially of works on the ethnomathematics of Africa. However, as many of his publications were written in Portuguese, German, and French, or published only in Mozambique, this book makes his work in ethnomathematics more accessible to English-speaking mathematicians.

== Topics ==
The book is heavily illustrated, and describes geometric patterns in the carvings, textiles, drawings and paintings of multiple African cultures. Although these are primarily decorative rather than mathematical, Gerdes adds his own mathematical analysis of the patterns, and suggests ways of incorporating this analysis into the mathematical curriculum.

It is divided into four chapters. The first of these provides an overview of geometric patterns in many African cultures, including examples of textiles, knotwork, architecture, basketry, metalwork, ceramics, petroglyphs, facial tattoos, body painting, and hair styles. The second chapter presents examples of designs in which squares and right triangles can be formed from elements of the patterns, and suggests educational activities connecting these materials to the Pythagorean theorem and to the theory of Latin squares. For instance, basket-weavers in Mozambique form square knotted buttons out of folded ribbons, and the resulting pattern of oblique lines crossing the square suggests a standard dissection-based proof of the theorem. The third chapter uses African designs, particularly in basket-weaving, to illustrate themes of symmetry, polygons and polyhedra, area, volume, and the theory of fullerenes. In the final chapter, the only one to concentrate on a single African culture, the book discusses the sona sand-drawings of the Chokwe people, in which a single self-crossing curve surrounds and separates a grid of points. These drawings connect to the theory of Euler tours, fractals, arithmetic series, and polyominos.

== Audience and reception ==
The book is aimed at primary and secondary school mathematics teachers. Reviewer Karen Dee Michalowicz, a school teacher, writes that although the connections between culture and mathematics are sometimes contrived, "every mathematics educator would benefit" from the book.

Ethnomathematician Marcia Ascher suggests that the book would have benefited from an index and a map of the cultures from which the material of the book was drawn. Nevertheless, reviewer Richard Kitchen evaluates this book as "the most complete volume available on the ethnomathematics of Africa". Reviewer Steve Abbott writes that the book "provides many opportunities for developing cross-curricular and multi-cultural approaches" to mathematics education, and that it is "an important book that deserves to be widely read".
