= Lusona =

Ideographic art tradition in parts of Africa

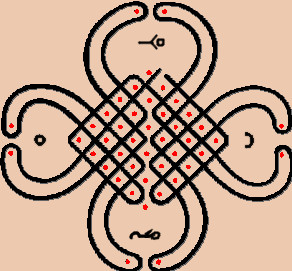
Lusona ideograph illustrating the story of the beginning of the world

Sona (sing. lusona) drawing is an ideographic tradition known across eastern Angola, northwestern Zambia and adjacent areas of the Democratic Republic of the Congo, and is mainly practiced by the Chokwe and Luchazi peoples. These ideographs function as mnemonic devices to help remember proverbs, fables, games, riddles and animals, and to transmit knowledge.

== History ==
=== Origins ===
According to ethnologist Gerhard Kubik, this tradition must be ancient and certainly pre-colonial, as observers independently collected the same ideographs among peoples separated for generations. Additionally, early petroglyphs from the Upper Zambezi area in Angola and Citundu-Hulu in the Moçâmedes Desert exhibit structural similarities with lusona ideographs. For example, a lusona known as cingelyengelye, and a lusona showing interlaced loops known as zinkhata, both appear in the rock arts of the Upper Zambezi recorded by José Redinha.

Those petroglyphs date from a period between the 6th century BC and the 1st-century BC. It's possible that those petroglyphs and Sona ideographs are related, however there is no direct evidence that this is the case, other than the similarities and the geographic location.

=== Post-16th century ===
One of the most basic lusona, katuva vufwati, sometimes appears on objects of trade carried by people in the Kingdoms of Matamba and Ndongo, that we can sometimes see depicted by the Italian missionary Antonio Cavazzi de Montecuccolo in watercolor drawings from his book about those kingdoms.

Depictions of basic eight-dot Sona in Antonio Cavazzi's watercolors
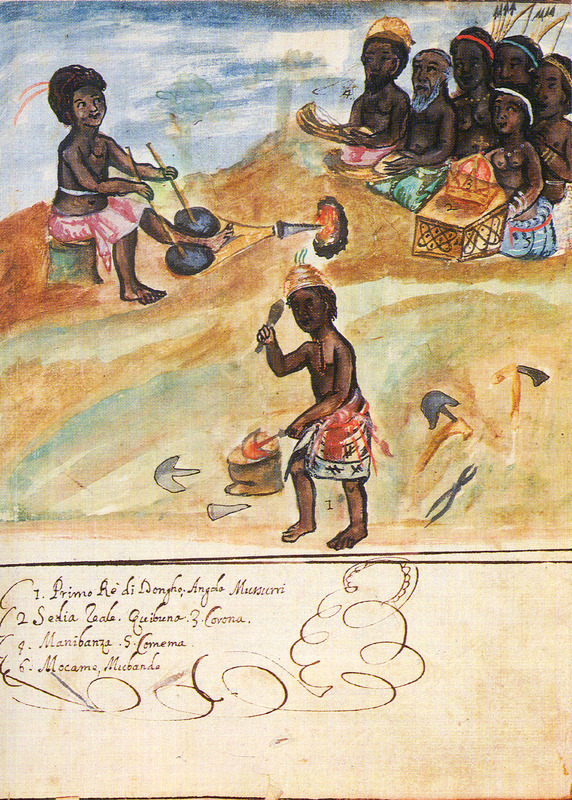
Scene of iron-working in 1650s Angola, with Lusona depicted on the upper right, below the crown

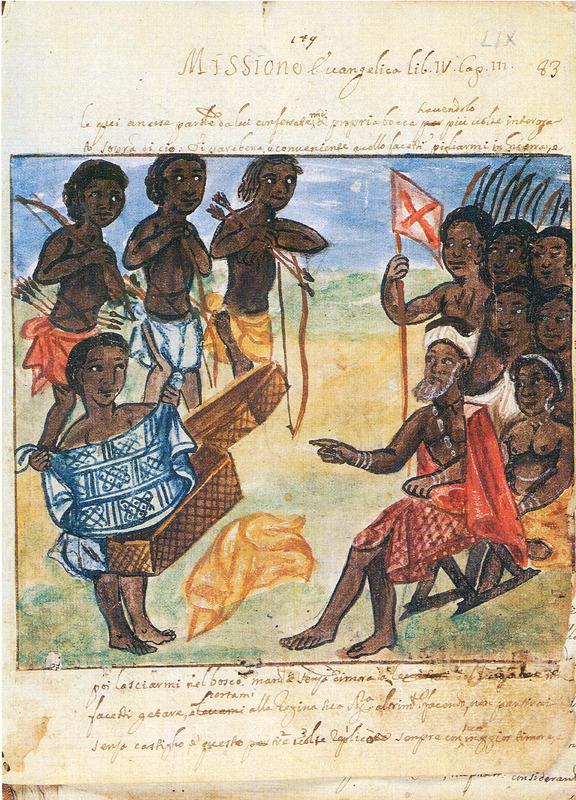
Scene of fiber textile trade in 1650s Angola, with Lusona depicted on the blue scarf on the left.

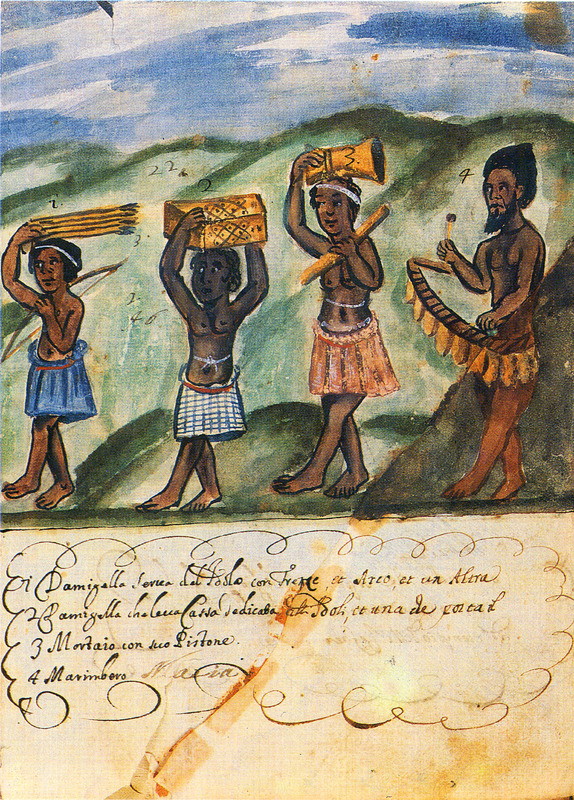
Scene of ceremonial procession in 1650s Angola, with Lusona depicted on the chest

Later, in the 20th century, various ethnographers and anthropologists would write on Sona ideographs, one of the first being Hermann Baumann in 1935 with his book "Lunda".

== Usage ==
Sona ideographs are sometimes used as murals, and most of the time executed in the sand. To make them, drawing experts — after cleaning and smoothing the ground — would impress equidistant dots and draw a continuous line between them. The dots can represent trees, persons or animals, while the lines can represent paths, rivers, fences, walls, contours of a body, etc.

== Mathematical properties ==
80% of the ideographs are symmetric and 60% are mono-linear. They are an example of the use of a coordinate system and geometric algorithms.

=== Geometric algorithms ===
Sona drawings can be classified by the algorithms used for their construction. Paulus Gerdes identified six algorithms, most commonly the "plaited-mat" algorithm, which seems to have been inspired by mat weaving.

=== Chaining rules and theorems ===
Various studies suggest that the drawing experts knew specific rules of "chaining" and "elimination" relating to the systematic construction of monolinear figures. Studies suggest that the "drawing experts" who invented these rules knew why they were valid, and could prove in one way or another the validity of the theorems that these rules express.

It is difficult to find accounts of theorems developed by the drawing experts to generalize specific patterns relating to dimension and monolinearity/polylinearity, as this tradition was secret and in extinction when it started to be recorded.

However, the drawing experts possibly knew that rectangles with relatively prime dimensions give one-line drawings. This idea is supported by the fact that of the 30 smallest relatively prime rectangular shapes, 75% appears among the documented drawings. It is further possible that they knew that if a square of a dot is added to a one-line lusona, the lusona would still be mono-linear. It seems clear that they had experimentally discovered this fact for 2 X 2 squares.
