= Science and technology in Cape Verde =

Science and technology in Cape Verde examines government policies designed to foster a national innovation system and the impact of these policies.

== Socio-economic context ==
GDP per capita and GERD GDP ratio in Cape Verde, 2010–2013 (average); other countries are given for comparison. Source: UNESCO Science Report: towards 2030 (2015), Figure 12.4

=== Governance ===
Cape Verde remains a model for political rights and civil liberties in Africa, according to a 2014 country study by the African Development Bank. In 2021, it ranked 4th on the Ibrahim Index of African Governance, which assesses 54 countries. On the Human Development Index, it is ranked 128th. Life expectancy was 76.9 years in 2023, the second-highest in Africa after Algeria.

=== Economic performance ===
The economy of Cape Verde is oriented towards services (75% of GDP in 2012), with agriculture contributing a further 8% and industry 17% of GDP. In 2012, the country's main export products were mackerel (16.5%), skipjack or stripebellied bonito (15.4%), and yellowfin tunas (14.2%). GDP per capita rose from $5,338 to $6,416 (in purchasing power parity) between 2007 and 2013. Between 2002 and 2008, Cape Verde experienced strong annual growth of over 4% which even peaked at 15% in 2007, according to the World Bank. After a brief recession in 2009, the economy bounced back to 4% growth in 2011, 0.8% in 2013, and 1.5% in 2015.

Thanks to its sustained economic performance, this isolated and fragmented territory with a dry Sahelian climate and scarce natural resources acceded to the World Bank's middle-income category in 2011. Only four other West African countries have obtained the same status: Côte d'Ivoire, Ghana, Nigeria and Senegal. In order to maintain the momentum, the government has devised its third Growth and Poverty Strategy P,aper covering the period 2012–2016. Expanding the coverage of health service delivery and human capital development have been designated priority areas to ensure inclusive growth, with an emphasis on technical and vocational training.

=== Education ===
In 2013, Cape Verde invested 5% of its GDP in education. Although this is down from 7.5% in 2004, it remains high. Cape Verde's literacy rate is the highest in West Africa: 98% of young people between the ages of 15 and 24 were literate in 2012. The same year, 93% of children attended secondary school in Cape Verde (up from 85% in 2009), compared to an average of 46% for West Africa as a whole.

Cape Verde spent 0.79% of GDP on higher education in 2013; this value increased to 0.9% in 2017. Cape Verde raised its tertiary enrolment rate from 15% in 2009 to 21% in 2012. The average gross enrolment rate for tertiary education in West Africa was 9.2% in 2012. The same year, there were 10 PhD students, 11,210 were studying for a bachelor's or master's degree, and 580 were enrolled in non-degree post-secondary education. In total, there were 11,800 tertiary students, compared to 4,567 in 2006. In 2011, 59% of tertiary students were women.

Cabo Verde stands out in West Africa for the inclusiveness of its higher education system. Women make up one-third of students but two-thirds of graduates. One in four young people attend university and one-third of students opt for STEM fields.

=== A 'cyber island' ===
Cape Verde Telecom linked all the islands by fibre optic cable in 2000. In December 2010, it joined the West African Cable System project to provide residents with an alternative access route to high-speed internet. Thanks to this, internet penetration more than doubled between 2008 and 2013 to 37.5% of the population. As the cost remains high, the government provides centres where people can surf the internet free of charge. In 2015, the government was planning to build a ‘cyber-island’ which would develop and offer services that include software development, computer maintenance and back office operations. Approved in 2013, the Praia Technology Park is a step in this direction. Financed by the African Development Bank, the park opened in June 2023.

The first phase of this digitalization project was completed in 2014 with the construction of a national data Centre and an upgrade of the telecommunications network, the government systems network platform and the island interconnection platform. By 2018, 57% of the population had access to Internet. According to the 2017 International Telecommunication Union Report, Cabo Verde ranks fourth in Africa in the ICT Development Index.

The government launched the Mundu Novu project in 2009 to modernize education. The project is introducing the concept of interactive education into teaching and mainstreaming informatics into curricula at different levels. Some 150 000 computers are being distributed to public schools. By early 2015, the Mundu Novu education plan had equipped 18 schools and training centres with internet access, installed the Wimax antenna network across the country, produced teaching kits on ICTs for 433 classrooms in 29 pilot schools (94% of all classrooms), given university students access to digital libraries and introduced courses in information technology, in addition to implementing an Integrated Management and Monitoring System for university students.

== Research trends ==
=== Financial investment ===
So far, the research sector has had little impact in West Africa, owing to a lack of national research and innovation strategies, low investment in research and development, little private-sector involvement and little intraregional collaboration among West African researchers. The government remains by far the biggest source of research funding in all countries.

In 2011, Cape Verde devoted just 0.07% of GDP to research and development, among the lowest rates in West Africa. The Ministry of Higher Education, Science and Culture plans to strengthen the research and academic sectors by placing emphasis on greater mobility, through exchange programmes and international co-operation agreements. As part of this strategy, Cape Verde is participating in the Ibero-American academic mobility programme that expects to mobilize 200 000 academics between 2015 and 2020. Cape Verde was ranked 95th in the Global Innovation Index in 2025.

=== Researchers ===
Cape Verde counted 25 researchers in 2011, a researcher density of 51 per million inhabitants. The world average was 1,083 per million in 2013. All 25 researchers were working in the government sector in 2011. There was no research being conducted in either medical or agricultural sciences.

One in three researchers were women (36%) in 2011. Of the eight engineers involved in research and development, one was a woman. Three of the five researchers working in natural sciences were women, as were three of the six social scientists and two of the five researchers from the humanities.

Table: Researchers in Cape Verde by volume and sector of employment, 2011

Other countries are given for comparison

| | Total (full-time equivalent) | | | By sector of employment (% of total) | | |
| | Numbers | Per million population | Women (%) | Business sector (%) | Government (%) | Higher education (%) |
| Burkina Faso, 2010 | 742 | 48 | 21.6 | – | – | – |
| Cape Verde, 2011 | 25 | 51 | 36.0 | 0.0 | 100.0 | 0.0 |
| Ghana, 2010 | 941 | 39 | 17.3 | 1.0 | 38.3 | 59.9 |
| Mali, 2010 | 443 | 32 | 14.1 | 49.0 | 34.0 | 16.9 |
| Nigeria, 2007 | 5 677 | 39 | 23.4 | 0.0 | 19.6 | 80.4 |
| Senegal, 2010 | 4 679 | 361 | 24.8 | 0.1 | 4.1 | 95.0 |
| Togo, 2012 | 242 | 36 | 9.4 | – | 22.1 | 77.9 |

Note: The sum of the breakdown by field of science may not correspond to the total because of fields not elsewhere classified.

Source: UNESCO Science Report: towards 2030 (2015), Table 18.5

Table: Researchers in Cape Verde by field of science, 2011

Other countries are given for comparison

| | Natural Sciences | Women (%) | Engineering | Women (%) | Medical and Health Sciences | Women (%) | Agricultural Sciences | Women (%) | Social Sciences | Women (%) | Humanities | Women (%) |
| Burkina Faso, 2010 | 98 | 12.2 | 121 | 12.8 | 344 | 27.4 | 64 | 13.7 | 26 | 15.5 | 49 | 30.4 |
| Cape Verde, 2011 | 5 | 60.0 | 8 | 12.5 | 0.0 | – | 0.0 | – | 6 | 50.0 | 6 | 33.3 |
| Ghana, 2010 | 164 | 17.5 | 120 | 7.7 | 135 | 19.3 | 183 | 14.1 | 197 | 18.6 | 118 | 26.8 |
| Senegal, 2010 | 841 | 16.9 | 99 | 14.1 | 898 | 31.7 | 110 | 27.9 | 2,326 | 27.2 | 296 | 17.1 |
| Togo, 2012 | 32 | 7.1 | 13 | 7.8 | 40 | 8.3 | 63 | 3.8 | 5 | 14.1 | 88 | 14.1 |

Source: UNESCO Science Report: towards 2030 (2015), Table 18.5

=== Research output ===
Cape Verde published a single article in an internationally catalogued journal in 2005 and 25 articles in 2014, according to Thomson Reuters' Web of Science (Science Citation Index Expanded). In 2014, Cape Verde had the second-highest publication intensity (65 articles per million inhabitants) in West Africa after Gambia (65 articles per million inhabitants), another country with a small population. The average for sub-Saharan Africa in 2014 was 20 articles per million inhabitants in the Web of Science (Science Citation Index Expanded).

Scientists from Cape Verde published most in geosciences between 2008 and 2014: 33 out of 78 articles (42% of output). Over this seven-year period, there were just 3 articles from this country focusing on agricultural sciences and seven on medical sciences. This is no doubt related to the fact that there were no researchers specializing in these two fields in 2011.

In the great majority of ECOWAS countries, more than eight out of ten scientific articles catalogued in the Web of Science (Science Citation Index Expanded) between 2008 and 2014 had foreign partners. In the case of Cape Verde, Guinea-Bissau and Liberia, this was even the case for the totality of articles, a situation which also correlates with a low output. The main collaborators of researchers from Cape Verde between 2008 and 2014 were Portuguese (42 articles), Spanish (23), British (15 ), American (11) and German (8) scientists.

== Regional science and technology policy ==
Cape Verde is a member of the Economic Community of West African States (ECOWAS). In 2011, ECOWAS adopted a Policy on Science and Technology (ECOPOST). ECOPOST is an integral part of the subregion's development blueprint to 2020, entitled Vision 2020. Vision 2020 proposes a road map for improving governance, accelerating economic and monetary integration and fostering public–private partnerships. It endorses the planned harmonization of investment laws in West Africa and suggests pursuing ‘with vigour’ the creation of a regional investment promotion agency. Countries are urged to promote efficient, viable small and medium-sized enterprises and to expose traditional agriculture to modern technology, entrepreneurship and innovation, in order to improve productivity.

ECOPOST provides a framework for member states wishing to improve – or elaborate for the first time – their own national policies and action plans for science, technology and innovation. Importantly, ECOPOST includes a mechanism for monitoring and evaluating the policy's implementation, an aspect often overlooked.

ECOPOST advocates the development of a science culture in all sectors of society, including through science popularization, the dissemination of research results in local and international journals, the commercialization of research results, greater technology transfer, intellectual property protection, stronger university–industry ties and the enhancement of traditional knowledge.

== Regional research centres ==
Two regional research centres have been set up in the city of Praia, the capital of Cape Verde, since 2010.

=== Centre for Renewable Energy and Energy Efficiency ===
The United Nations Industrial Development Organization (UNIDO) established the ECOWAS Centre for Renewable Energy and Energy Efficiency (ECREEE) in Praia in 2010. The centre has been established within the United Nations' Sustainable Energy for All programme. The mission of the centre is to create favorable framework conditions for renewable energy and energy efficiency markets in the 15 member states of the Economic Community of West African States (ECOWAS). Since its founding, there has been growing external demand for its services.

Cabo Verde plans to lead by example by becoming entirely reliant on renewable energy sources by 2025.

Two other centres in sub-Saharan Africa will seek to replicate the ECREEE model. One will be established by UNIDO and the East African Community to serve Burundi, Kenya, Rwanda, Tanzania and Uganda. A second will serve the 15 Member States of the Southern Africa Development Community. Both centres should be fully operational by 2014. Other centres are being established within the same network in the Caribbean and Pacific.

=== West Africa Institute ===
The West Africa Institute was established in Praia in 2010 to provide the missing link between policy and research in the regional integration process. The institute is a service provider, conducting research for regional and national public institutions, the private sector, civil society and the media. The think tank also organizes political and scientific dialogues between policy-makers, regional institutions and members of civil society. There are ten research themes:

- the historical and cultural bases of regional integration;
- citizenship;
- governance;
- regional security;
- economic challenges to market integration in West Africa;
- new information and communication technologies;
- education;
- the problem of shared resources (land, water, minerals, coastal and maritime security);
- funding of non-governmental organizations in West Africa; and
- migration.

The idea for the West Africa Institute emerged from 15 research workshops on the theme of regional integration organized in the ECOWAS member states by UNESCO's Management of Social Transformations programme. In 2008, the Summit of Heads of State and Government of ECOWAS in Ouagadougou (Burkina Faso) unanimously endorsed the idea to create the West Africa Institute In 2009, UNESCO's General Conference established the West Africa Institute as one of its category 2 institutes, which means that it functions under the auspices of UNESCO. A year later, the Government of Cape Verde passed a law establishing the institute in the capital. The institute is the fruit of a public–private partnership involving ECOWAS, the West African Economic and Monetary Union, UNESCO, the pan-African Ecobank and the Government of Cape Verde.

== Sources ==
This article incorporates text from a free content work. Licensed under CC-BY-SA IGO 3.0. Text taken from UNESCO Science Report: towards 2030, ??, UNESCO, UNESCO Publishing.

- This article incorporates text from a free content work. Licensed under C-BY-SA 3.0 IGO. Text taken from UNESCO Science Report: the Race Against Time for Smarter Development., Schneegans, S., T. Straza and J. Lewis (eds), UNESCO.
