= Paulus Gerdes =

Mozambican mathematician

Paulus Pierre Joseph Gerdes (November 11, 1952 – November 10, 2014) was a Dutch mathematician and university professor, who was one of the pioneers in the field of ethnomathematics research, particularly in Africa.

== Education and career ==
Gerdes was a student of mathematics and physics as an undergraduate at Radboud University Nijmegen. After visiting Vietnam he returned to Radboud for a second bachelor's degree, in cultural anthropology in 1974, and a master's degree in mathematics in 1975.

He moved to Mozambique in 1976, started working at Eduardo Mondlane University in 1977, and remained in the country for the rest of his life, with positions in the Ministry of Education and Culture and as dean and later rector at the Instituto Superior Pedagógico (now Pedagogical University of Maputo).

In 1986, he completed a doctorate (Dr. rer. nat.) through the Pädagogische Hochschule „Karl Friedrich Wilhelm Wander“ Dresden in Germany, with the dissertation Zum erwachenden geometrischen Denken: Tätigkeit und die mögliche Herkunft einiger früher geometrischer Begriffe und Relationen, unter besonderer Berücksichtigung der Mathematik der Entwicklungsländer [On the awakening of geometric thinking: activity and the possible origin of some early geometric concepts and relations, with special reference to the mathematics of the developing countries] supervised by Heiner Meyer.

He also headed the founding commission of Lúrio University, and chaired the Commission on the History of Mathematics in Africa of the African Mathematical Union. He served as the secretary of the Southern African Mathematical Sciences Association, was vice president of the African Academy of Sciences, and was president of the International Association for Science and Cultural Diversity and of the International Group of Ethno-mathematical Studies.

== Recognition ==
Gerdes was elected to the African Academy of Sciences in 2001, and as a corresponding member of the International Academy of the History of Science in 2005.

A special issue of the Journal of Mathematics and Culture was published in his memory in 2021.

== Books ==
Gerdes's books include:

- Ethnogeometrie. Kulturanthropologische Beiträge zur Genese und Didaktik der Geometrie [Ethnogeometry. Contributions to the genesis and didactics of geometry from the point of view of cultural anthropology] (in German; Franzbecker, 1990). Revised and translated into English as Awakening of Geometrical Thought in Early Culture (MEP Publications, 2003)
- L'ethnomathématique comme nouveau domaine de recherche en. Quelques réflexions et expériences du Mozambique [Ethnomathematics as a new field of research in Africa. Some reflections about and experiences in Mozambique] (in French; Inst. Sup. Ped. Mozambique, 1993)
- African Pythagoras: A study in culture and mathematics education (originally in Portuguese, 1992; Inst. Sup. Ped. Mozambique, 1994; color ed., Mozambican Ethnomathematics Research Centre, 2011)
- Sipatsi: Technology, Art and Geometry in Inhambane (with Gildo Bufalo, Inst. Sup. Ped. Mozambique 1994)
- Sona Geometry: Reflections on the tradition of sand drawings in Africa south of the Equator (Inst. Sup. Ped. Mozambique 1994)
- Ethnomathematics and Education in Africa (Univ. Pedagógica, Gabinet do Reitor, Stockholm, 1995)
- Women and Geometry in Southern Africa: Some suggestions for further research (Univ. Ped. Maputo 1995); translated as Femmes et géométrie en Afrique Australe (L'Harmattan, 1996)
- Une tradition géométrique en Afrique—les dessins sur le sable [A geometric tradition in Africa—sand drawings], Vols. I–III (in French; L’Harmattan, 1995)
- Ethnomathematik — dargestellt am Beispiel der Sona Geometrie [Ethnomathematics — described by the example of Sona geometry] (in German, Spektrum, 1997)
- Lusona: récréations géométriques d'Afrique [Lusona: geometrical recreations of Africa] (1997)
- Geometry from Africa: Mathematical and Educational Explorations (Mathematical Association of America, 1999)
- Women, Art and Geometry in Southern Africa (Africa World Press, 1999)
- Mathematics in African History and Cultures: An annotated bibliography (with Ahmed Djebbar, African Mathematical Union, 2004; 2nd ed., 2007)
- Sona Geometry from Angola: Mathematics of an African tradition (Polimetrica International Scientific Publisher, 2006)
- African Doctorates in Mathematics: A Catalogue (African Mathematical Union, 2007)
- Otthava: Fazer Cestos E Geometria Na Cultura Makhuwa Do Nordeste de Moçambique (self-published, 2007; translated as Otthava: making baskets and doing geometry in the Makhuwa culture in the Northeast of Mozambique, 2011)
- Drawings from Angola: Living Mathematics (self-published, 2007)
- Tinlhèlò. Interweaving art and mathematics. Colourful basket trays from the south of Mozambique (self-published, 2010)
- From Ethnomathematics to Art: Design Matrices and Cyclic Matrices (UNESP, 2010)
