= Barbaro Martinez-Ruiz =

Barbaro Martinez-Ruiz is Leverhulme Distinguished Professor and Senior Fellow at St Antony's College, University of Oxford.

== Biographical Information ==
Felix Barbaro Martinez-Ruiz, born in 1967, is an art historian whose work examines the links between visual culture, performance and art. Martinez-Ruiz's work interrogates and traces the connections between the Bakongo traditions of graphic writing prevalent in the Democratic Republic of the Congo & Angola and the Palo Monte traditions in Cuba. More broadly, Martinez-Ruiz's research challenges the disciplinary boundaries of art history to unfold the rich and valuable visual communication, ethnography, ecology and cosmologies by and through the art and cultural heritage of African Atlantic diasporas. Martinez-Ruiz received his BA at the University of Havana in 1994 and his PhD from Yale University in 2004. At Yale he was a student of Robert Farris Thompson, who wrote the Flash of the Spirit: African and Afro-American Art and Philosophy. Martinez-Ruiz grew up in Cuba Oriente, the eastern provinces of Cuba and later moved to Havana. At the age of 18 he was drafted into the Cuban military and was sent to Angola as a soldier. Upon his return to Cuba, he finished his degree began teaching Caribbean art and working in film, at the Instituto Superior de Arte, in Havana, and Havana University. In this capacity he was able to return to Angola to collaborate with other artists on a film. The film project became a point of entry into the Kongo graphic writing systems and rock painting studies that has informed his research for over 27 years.

== Selected publications ==
- Kongo Graphic Writing and Other Narratives of the Sign, Temple University Press, 2013 (English)
- El Colegio de México, 2012 (Spanish)
- Faisal Abdu’Allah: On the Art of Dislocation, Atlantic Center of Modern Art Press, 2012
- Art and Emancipation in Jamaica: Isaac Mendes Belisario and his Worlds, Yale University Press, 2007 (College Art Association Alfred H. Barr Award)
- Ma kisi Nsi: L’art de habitants de region de Mbanza Kongo, in Angola figures de pouvoir, Paris: Dapper Museum Press, 2010.
- Writing Bodies in the Bakongo Atlantic Experience, in Performances: Challenges for Art and Anthropology, Quai Branly Museum Press, 2010.
- Funerary Pots of the Kongo in Central Africa, in African Terra Cotta: A Millenary Heritage. Geneva, Musee Barbier Mueller Press, 2008.
- "The Impossible Reflection: A New Approach to African Themes in Wifredo Lam’s Art", in Wifredo Lam. Miami: Perez Art Museum Press, 2008.
