= Giovanni Cavazzi da Montecuccolo =

Italian Capuchin missionary

The Reverend Giovanni Antonio Cavazzi da Montecuccolo OFM Conv.
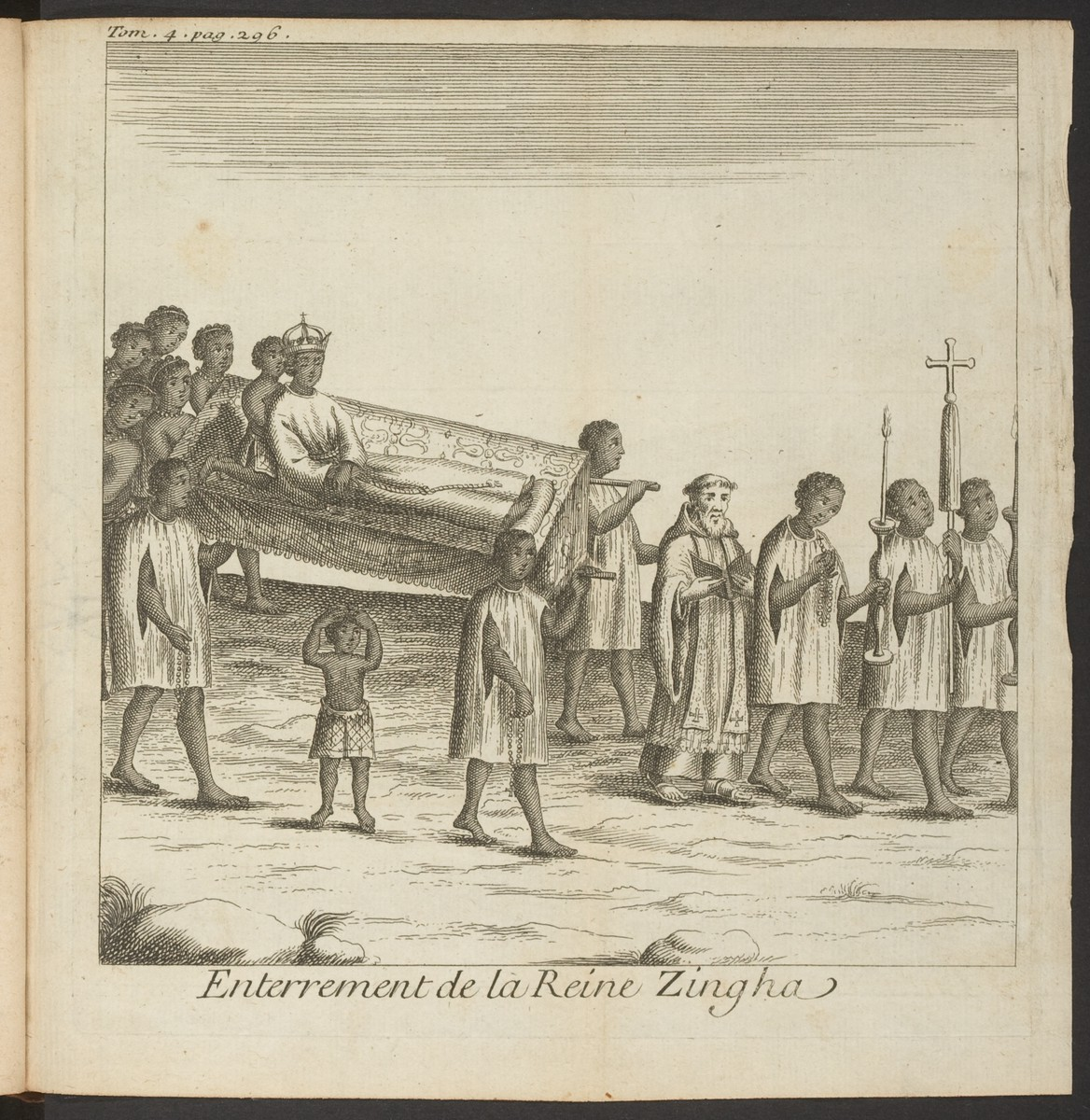
- Giovanni Cavazzi da Montecuccolo presides over Queen Nzinga's funeral
- Born: Galeotto Cavazzi; October 13, 1621; Montecuccolo, Duchy of Modena and Reggio
- Died: 18 July 1678 (aged 56); Genoa, Republic of Genoa
- Occupations: Capuchin friar, missionary
- Years active: 1654-1677
- Notable work: Istorica Descrizione de' tre regni Congo, Matamba ed Angola

Giovanni Antonio Cavazzi da Montecuccolo, OFM Conv. (October 13, 1621–July 18, 1678) was an Italian Capuchin missionary priest noted for his travels in 17th century Portuguese Angola and his lengthy account of local history and culture as well as a history of the Capuchin mission there.

== Biography ==
Cavazzi was an indifferent student and was almost denied a position in the central African mission, but eventually prevailed thanks to his piety. A Capuchin Franciscan priest, he arrived in Luanda in 1654 and was dispatched to the Portuguese possessions in the eastern end of the colony. He traveled widely as a chaplain with the Portuguese Army including a stay at the court of the king of Pungo Andongo, a trip with them, in 1659 into the central highlands region, a visit in 1660 to the court of Queen Nzinga (or Njinga) in Matamba and the Kingdom of Kongo. He returned to Njinga's court in 1662 and remained there after the queen's death in 1663. He presided at her funeral and left Matamba in 1665, returning to Italy in 1667.

He was assigned the task of writing a history of the Capuchin mission, perhaps because since 1662 or so he had been writing his own history. He worked in the archives in Italy to round out his history, but the Holy Congregation for the Propagation of the Faith, which had commissioned the work, was reluctant to publish it, and in fact it was not published until 1687, after Cavazzi's death. In 1673 he returned to Angola as prefect of the Capuchin mission. He returned to Italy in 1677 where he wrote a second biographical account of the Capuchin mission, which was not published until the twentieth century.

He died on July 18, 1678.

== Works ==
Cavazzi is famous for his descriptive history, Istorica Descrizione de' tre regni Congo, Matamba ed Angola. There were many translations, a German one in 1694 and a French one in 1732. The modern critical edition and Portuguese translation of the book, edited by Graziano Saccardo was published in 2 volumes in Lisbon (1965).

In 1969, Giuseppe Pistoni discovered the original manuscripts of Cavazzi's work, written in Africa in 1668 among the papers of the Araldi Family of Modena. This collection, three bulky manuscripts, was also illustrated with vivid watercolor illustrations of life in Central Africa and particularly at the court of Queen Njinga. The illustrations were subsequently published by Ezio Bassani. John K. Thornton has edited and translated the first volume (A).

In addition to his extensive history, Cavazzi reedited some of his missionary biographies, found in both the Araldi MSS and in Istorica Descrizione into a new text, "Vite dei Frati Minori Cappuccini del Ordine del Serafica Padre San Francisco, morti nelle Missioni d'Etiopia dall'anno 1645 sino all'anno 1677."
