= An Historical Description of Three Kingdoms: Congo, Matamba, and Angola =

Extensive work written by Giovanni Antonio Cavazzi da Montecuccolo

An Historical Description of Three Kingdoms: Congo, Matamba, and Angola (Italian Istorica descrizione de' tre' regni Congo, Matamba et Angola) is an extensive work written by Giovanni Antonio Cavazzi da Montecuccolo, an Italian Capuchin missionary, over a long period while working as a missionary in Angola, between 1654 and 1677.

The work was commissioned by the Holy Congregation for the Propagation of the Faith when Cavazzi returned from his first missionary trip to Angola in 1668. He completed a draft of the manuscript of the work around 1671, but opposition from the Church, primarily because of many miracle stories, which had fallen out of favor in the church, prevented its publication. After an interval, the task of editing the work was given to another Capuchin, Fortunato da Alamandini, who edited it, and it was eventually published in 1687 in Bologna. A second edition appeared in Milan in 1690.

Cavazzi probably began writing this work around 1660, perhaps in response to his witnessing the conversion of Queen Njinga to Christianity, which he regarded as something of a miracle. He wrote several drafts of a work which he called "Missione Evangelica" which he completed in 1668. This work, which is in the possession of the Araldi Family of Modena, Italy, was published in English translation on the internet by John Thornton, with a full introduction, and a comparison between this early manuscript and that of the eventual book.

In 2019, the original manuscript was deposited by members of the Araldi family in the Biblioteca Estense Universitaria in Modena, and can be consulted there by anyone.

The Italian scholar, Alessandra Semeraro, published a full transcription of MS A of the Araldi documents, in 2023 as I MANOSCRITTI DI GIOVANNI ANTONIO CAVAZZI DA MONTECUCCOLO: UN FRATE CAPPUCCINO NELL’ANGOLA DEL XVII SECOLO, PhD dissertation Universita da Studi Internationali, Rome in two volumes. It is online at:https://iris.unint.eu/retrieve/5bd502c4-097d-46ff-8fdb-db9627cd1f2d/TESI%20Semeraro.pdf
