= Luba calendar =

Calendar used by Luba people

The Luba people of the Democratic Republic of the Congo have a twelve-month calendar which is thought to begin in September. Each month is named for natural occurrences and human activity appropriate to that time.

== Months ==
1. Mvul'a Mbedi (September) - "first rains", the beginning of the rainy season
2. Kibitenda (October) - "white ants come out"
3. Kaswa Bitenda (November) - "the little insects that can be seen here and there", brown ants come out of their mounds
4. Tshiswe Munene (December) - "numerous brown ants"
5. Tshiongo Wa Minanga (January) - "month of drought"
6. Luishi (February) - "planting season" (corn)
7. Lumungulu (March) - "planting season"
8. Luabanya Nkasu (April) - "hoe distributor", a weeding month
9. Tshisanga Nkasu (May) - "hoe assembling", the dry season, no planting goes on
10. Kashipu Nkenza (June) - "first cold, dry air, then hot."
11. Tshibungu Mulume (July) - "the cloudy month with a strong cloud"
12. Tshibungu Mukaji (August) - "the cloudy month with a weak cloud"
