= Troposphere (rocket family) =

Congolese experimental rocket family

Troposphere is a Congolese rocket family first developed in 2007 at the private enterprise Développement Tous Azimuts (DTA). The project is managed by Jean-Patrice Keka Ohemba Okese, head of DTA, a graduate of the Institut Supérieur des Techniques Appliquées (ISTA). The program aimed at launching experimental rockets that would not exceed an altitude of 36 km. The launch site is located in an area owned by DTA at Menkao, 120 km East of Kinshasa.

The program was financed by DTA at the beginning, but after the success of the Troposphere 2 and 4 rockets the project gained government support.

== Rockets ==
=== Troposphere 1 and 3 ===
Troposphere 1, which was planned for launch in April 2007, was canceled due to technical problems. Troposphere 3 scheduled for October 12, 2007 was also a failure.

=== Troposphere 2 ===
The first successful rocket, Troposphere 2 (30.94 kg and 0.19 m in diameter), launched in 2007 and reached an altitude of 1500 m (1.5 km).

=== Troposphere 4 ===
Troposphere 4
- Manufacturer: Développement Tous Azimuts (DTA), SPRL
- Country of origin: Democratic Republic of Congo
- Cost per year: 2009

Size
- Diameter: 16 cm
- Mass: 200 kg

Launch history
- Status: Experimental
- Launch sites: 1
- Total launches: 1
- Success(es): 1
- Failure: 0
- Partial failure: 0
- First flight: July 10, 2008

Troposphere 4 is the second successfully launched experimental rocket of the Troposphere program, managed by Jean-Patrice Keka.

The rocket with a thrust of 1 ton was launched on July 10, 2008, 5:40 pm from Menkao, 120 kilometres (75 mi) east of Kinshasa. The rocket reached an altitude of 15 kilometres (49,000 ft) after 47 seconds, with a speed of Mach 2.7.

The launch of the Troposphere 4 rocket took place in the presence of the Congolese Minister of Higher Education, University and Scientific Research, Leonard Masuga Rugamika. After the success of this launch, the Congolese government decided to get involved with the Troposphere project.

=== Troposphere 5 ===
Troposphere 5
- Manufacturer: Développement Tous Azimuts (DTA), SPRL
- Country of origin: Democratic Republic of Congo
- Cost per year: 2009

Size
- Height: 5 m
- Mass: 750 kg
- Stages: 2

Launch history
- Status: Experimental
- Launch sites: 1
- Total launches: 1
- Success(es): 0
- Failure: 1
- Partial failure: 0
- First flight: 29 March 2009

Troposphere 5 is a two stage solid-propellant rocket with a thrust of 70 kN (7 tons), launched on March 29, 2009. It is the third rocket in the program. It was an initiative of the private enterprise Developpement Tous Azimuts (DTA) with headquarters in Lubumbashi (Katanga Province), created in 2007.

Troposphere 5 carrying a rat named Kavira on board, was designed to reach an altitude of 36 km and a speed of Mach 3. The rocket was launched at Menkao launch site. Launch ended in failure - the rocket took off but had deviated from its course and was lost in the distance. The cost of this rocket has been estimated at $50,000. Despite Troposphere 5 being equipped with an escape chute, Kavira was never found and was officially reported to have died in the name of science. According to Keka the experiment provided valuable data for future tests by the DTA. The investigations showed that the failure was caused by a degradation of the solid propellant due to poor transportation conditions, which caused an unbalanced thrust.

=== Troposphere 6 ===
DTA is currently working on the next rocket, Troposphere 6. Troposphere 6 is a three-stage solid-propellant rocket and Keka claimed that the rocket could reached up to altitude of 200 km. Troposphere 6 was scheduled to be launched in the end of 2016. A crowd funding has been set up to support Congolese space rocket set to launch sometime between fall of 2019 to spring of 2020. Its aim is to send a satellite Njiwas into space to take a picture of Earth at an altitude of 200 km.
