= 2015 FIFA U-20 World Cup squads =

FIFA championship roster

The following is the squad list for the 2015 FIFA U-20 World Cup. Each squad consisted of 21 players in total, 3 of whom had to be goalkeepers.

Those marked in bold have been capped at full International level.

== Group A ==
=== New Zealand ===
Head coach: (England) Darren Bazeley

No.	Pos.	Player	Date of birth (age)	Caps	Goals	Club
1	GK	**Oliver Sail**	13 January 1996 (aged 19)	0	0	(New Zealand Football) Wellington Phoenix
2	DF	Jesse Edge	26 February 1995 (aged 20)	0	0	(Italian Football Federation) Vicenza
3	DF	**Deklan Wynne**	20 March 1995 (aged 20)	0	0	(New Zealand Football) Wanderers
4	DF	**Sam Brotherton**	2 October 1996 (aged 18)	0	0	(New Zealand Football) Wanderers
5	DF	**Adam Mitchell**	1 June 1996 (aged 18)	0	0	(New Zealand Football) Wanderers
6	DF	**Bill Tuiloma** (c)	27 March 1995 (aged 20)	0	0	(French Football Federation) Marseille
7	FW	**Joel Stevens**	7 February 1995 (aged 20)	0	0	(New Zealand Football) Wellington Phoenix
8	MF	**Moses Dyer**	21 March 1997 (aged 18)	0	0	(New Zealand Football) Wanderers
9	MF	**Alex Rufer**	12 June 1996 (aged 18)	0	0	(New Zealand Football) Wellington Phoenix
10	MF	**Clayton Lewis**	12 February 1997 (aged 18)	0	0	(New Zealand Football) Wanderers
11	MF	**Matthew Ridenton**	11 March 1996 (aged 19)	0	0	(New Zealand Football) Wellington Phoenix
12	GK	**Nik Tzanev**	23 December 1996 (aged 18)	0	0	(The Football Association) Brentford
13	DF	Brock Messenger	8 September 1995 (aged 19)	0	0	(New Zealand Football) Wanderers
14	DF	Cory Brown	3 April 1996 (aged 19)	0	0	(United States Soccer Federation) Xavier Musketeers
15	FW	**Monty Patterson**	9 December 1996 (aged 18)	0	0	(The Football Association) Ipswich Town
16	MF	**Te Atawhai Hudson-Wihongi**	27 March 1995 (aged 20)	0	0	(New Zealand Football) Wanderers
17	FW	Andrew Blake	14 March 1996 (aged 19)	0	0	(New Zealand Football) Wellington Phoenix
18	MF	**Andre de Jong**	2 November 1996 (aged 18)	0	0	(New Zealand Football) Wanderers
19	FW	Stuart Holthusen	1 January 1996 (aged 19)	0	0	(United States Soccer Federation) Akron Zips
20	FW	**Noah Billingsley**	6 August 1997 (aged 17)	0	0	(New Zealand Football) Wanderers
21	GK	Damian Hirst	14 June 1995 (aged 19)	0	0	(New Zealand Football) Wanderers

=== Ukraine ===
Head coach: (Ukraine) Oleksandr Petrakov

No.	Pos.	Player	Date of birth (age)	Caps	Goals	Club
1	GK	Roman Pidkivka	9 May 1995 (aged 20)			(Ukrainian Association of Football) Karpaty Lviv
2	DF	**Taras Kacharaba**	7 January 1995 (aged 20)			(Ukrainian Association of Football) Hoverla Uzhhorod
3	DF	Artur Kuznetsov	9 March 1995 (aged 20)			(Ukrainian Association of Football) Metalurh Zaporizhya
4	DF	**Mykyta Burda**	24 March 1995 (aged 20)			(Ukrainian Association of Football) Dynamo Kyiv
5	MF	Yuriy Tkachuk	18 April 1995 (aged 20)			(Ukrainian Association of Football) Metalist Kharkiv
6	MF	Vyacheslav Tankovskyi	16 August 1995 (aged 19)			(Ukrainian Association of Football) Shakhtar Donetsk
7	MF	Yevhen Chumak	25 August 1995 (aged 19)			(Ukrainian Association of Football) Dynamo Kyiv
8	DF	Pavlo Polehenko	6 January 1995 (aged 20)			(Ukrainian Association of Football) Dynamo Kyiv
9	FW	Vladyslav Kabayev	1 September 1995 (aged 19)			(Ukrainian Association of Football) Chornomorets Odesa
10	FW	**Artem Besyedin**	31 March 1996 (aged 19)			(Ukrainian Association of Football) Metalist Kharkiv
11	FW	**Roman Yaremchuk**	27 November 1995 (aged 19)			(Ukrainian Association of Football) Dynamo Kyiv
12	GK	Bohdan Sarnavskyi	29 January 1995 (aged 20)			(Ukrainian Association of Football) Shakhtar Donetsk
13	MF	Artem Habelok	2 January 1995 (aged 20)			(Ukrainian Association of Football) Shakhtar Donetsk
14	MF	Valeriy Luchkevych	11 January 1996 (aged 19)			(Ukrainian Association of Football) Dnipro Dnipropetrovsk
15	FW	Mykyta Tatarkov	4 January 1995 (aged 20)			(Ukrainian Association of Football) Metalurh Zaporizhya
16	GK	Yevhen Hrytsenko	5 February 1995 (aged 20)			(Ukrainian Association of Football) Shakhtar Donetsk
17	MF	**Viktor Kovalenko**	14 February 1996 (aged 19)			(Ukrainian Association of Football) Shakhtar Donetsk
18	DF	**Eduard Sobol**	20 April 1995 (aged 20)			(Ukrainian Association of Football) Metalurh Donetsk
19	DF	Oleksiy Kovtun	5 February 1995 (aged 20)			(Ukrainian Association of Football) Metalist Kharkiv
20	FW	Yevhen Nemtinov	3 October 1995 (aged 19)			(Ukrainian Association of Football) Illichivets Mariupol
21	MF	**Ihor Kharatin**	2 February 1995 (aged 20)			(Ukrainian Association of Football) Dynamo Kyiv

=== United States ===
Head coach: (United States) Tab Ramos

No.	Pos.	Player	Date of birth (age)	Caps	Goals	Club
1	GK	**Zack Steffen**	2 April 1995 (aged 20)			(German Football Association) SC Freiburg
2	DF	**Shaq Moore**	2 November 1996 (aged 18)			(Royal Spanish Football Federation) Huracán Valencia
3	DF	John Requejo	23 May 1996 (aged 19)			(Mexican Football Federation) Tijuana
4	DF	**Cameron Carter-Vickers**	31 December 1997 (aged 17)			(The Football Association) Tottenham Hotspur
5	DF	**Matt Miazga**	19 July 1995 (aged 19)			(United States Soccer Federation) New York Red Bulls
6	MF	**Kellyn Acosta**	24 July 1995 (aged 19)			(United States Soccer Federation) FC Dallas
7	MF	**Paul Arriola**	5 February 1995 (aged 20)			(Mexican Football Federation) Tijuana
8	MF	**Emerson Hyndman** (c)	9 April 1996 (aged 19)			(The Football Association) Fulham
9	FW	**Rubio Rubin**	1 March 1996 (aged 19)			(Royal Dutch Football Association) Utrecht
10	MF	Joel Soñora	15 September 1996 (aged 18)			(Argentine Football Association) Boca Juniors
11	FW	Bradford Jamieson IV	18 November 1996 (aged 18)			(United States Soccer Federation) LA Galaxy
12	GK	Thomas Olsen	14 February 1995 (aged 20)			(United States Soccer Federation) San Diego Toreros
13	FW	Tommy Thompson	15 August 1995 (aged 19)			(United States Soccer Federation) San Jose Earthquakes
14	FW	Maki Tall	30 October 1995 (aged 19)			(French Football Federation) Red Star
15	MF	**Marky Delgado**	16 May 1995 (aged 20)			(Canadian Soccer Association) Toronto FC
16	DF	Conor Donovan	8 January 1996 (aged 19)			(United States Soccer Federation) Orlando City SC
17	DF	Desevio Payne	30 November 1995 (aged 19)			(Royal Dutch Football Association) Groningen
18	DF	**Erik Palmer-Brown**	24 April 1997 (aged 18)			(United States Soccer Federation) Sporting Kansas City
19	MF	Gedion Zelalem	26 January 1997 (aged 18)			(The Football Association) Arsenal
20	FW	Jordan Allen	25 April 1995 (aged 20)			(United States Soccer Federation) Real Salt Lake
21	GK	Jeff Caldwell	20 February 1996 (aged 19)			(United States Soccer Federation) Virginia Cavaliers

=== Myanmar ===
Head coach: (Germany) Gerd Zeise

No.	Pos.	Player	Date of birth (age)	Caps	Goals	Club
1	GK	**Myo Min Latt**	20 February 1995 (aged 20)			(Myanmar Football Federation) Kanbawza
2	DF	Aung Moe Htwe	5 February 1995 (aged 20)			(Myanmar Football Federation) Hantharwady United
3	DF	**Htike Htike Aung**	1 February 1995 (aged 20)			(Myanmar Football Federation) Ayeyawady United
4	DF	Naing Lin Tun	16 June 1995 (aged 19)			(Myanmar Football Federation) Magway
5	DF	**Nanda Kyaw** (c)	3 September 1996 (aged 18)			(Myanmar Football Federation) Magway
6	MF	**Kyaw Min Oo**	16 June 1996 (aged 18)			(Myanmar Football Federation) Yangon United
7	MF	**Nyein Chan Aung**	18 August 1996 (aged 18)			(Myanmar Football Federation) Yangon United
8	FW	**Maung Maung Soe**	6 August 1995 (aged 19)			(Myanmar Football Federation) Magway
9	FW	**Aung Thu**	22 May 1996 (aged 19)			(Myanmar Football Federation) Yadanarbon
10	FW	**Than Paing**	6 December 1996 (aged 18)			(Myanmar Football Federation) Yangon United
11	FW	**Maung Maung Lwin**	18 June 1995 (aged 19)			(Myanmar Football Federation) Hantharwady United
12	DF	Hlaing Myo Aung	23 April 1996 (aged 19)			(Myanmar Football Federation) Zwekapin United
13	DF	Yan Lin Aung	17 August 1996 (aged 18)			(Myanmar Football Federation) Yangon United
14	DF	Nan Wai Min	1 January 1996 (aged 19)			(Myanmar Football Federation) Yangon United
15	MF	**Yan Naing Oo**	31 March 1996 (aged 19)			(Myanmar Football Federation) Zeyar Shwe Myay
16	MF	**Myo Ko Tun**	12 March 1995 (aged 20)			(Myanmar Football Federation) Yadanarbon
17	DF	**Thiha Htet Aung**	13 March 1996 (aged 19)			(Myanmar Football Federation) Yangon United
18	GK	Pyae Sone Chit	28 October 1995 (aged 19)			(Myanmar Football Federation) Yadanarbon
19	MF	Swan Htet Aung	18 September 1995 (aged 19)			(Myanmar Football Federation) Yangon United
20	DF	Myo Zaw Oo	24 December 1995 (aged 19)			(Myanmar Football Federation) Hantharwady United
21	GK	Wai Lin Aung	20 May 1996 (aged 19)			(Myanmar Football Federation) Yangon United

== Group B ==
=== Argentina ===
Head coach: (Argentina) Humberto Grondona

No.	Pos.	Player	Date of birth (age)	Caps	Goals	Club
1	GK	Augusto Batalla	30 April 1996 (aged 19)			(Argentine Football Association) River Plate
2	DF	**Emanuel Mammana**	10 February 1996 (aged 19)			(Argentine Football Association) River Plate
3	DF	Lucas Suárez	17 March 1995 (aged 20)			(Argentine Football Association) Quilmes
4	MF	Nicolás Tripichio	5 January 1996 (aged 19)			(Argentine Football Association) Vélez Sarsfield
5	MF	**Andrés Cubas**	22 May 1996 (aged 19)			(Argentine Football Association) Boca Juniors
6	DF	Tiago Casasola	11 August 1995 (aged 19)			(The Football Association) Fulham
7	FW	Cristian Espinoza	3 April 1995 (aged 20)			(Argentine Football Association) Huracán
8	MF	Leonardo Rolón	19 January 1995 (aged 20)			(Argentine Football Association) Vélez Sarsfield
9	FW	**Giovanni Simeone**	5 July 1995 (aged 19)			(Argentine Football Association) River Plate
10	MF	Tomás Martínez	7 March 1995 (aged 20)			(Argentine Football Association) River Plate
11	FW	**Ángel Correa**	9 March 1995 (aged 20)			(Royal Spanish Football Federation) Atlético Madrid
12	GK	José Devecchi	1 September 1995 (aged 19)			(Argentine Football Association) San Lorenzo
13	GK	Agustín Rossi	21 August 1995 (aged 19)			(Argentine Football Association) Estudiantes La Plata
14	FW	**Cristian Pavon**	21 January 1996 (aged 19)			(Argentine Football Association) Boca Juniors
15	FW	Maxi Rolón	19 January 1995 (aged 20)			(Royal Spanish Football Federation) Barcelona B
16	MF	Daniel Ibáñez	29 March 1995 (aged 20)			(Argentine Football Association) San Lorenzo
17	MF	**Kaku**	11 January 1995 (aged 20)			(Argentine Football Association) Huracán
18	DF	Leandro Vega	27 May 1996 (aged 19)			(Argentine Football Association) River Plate
19	FW	**Emiliano Buendía**	25 December 1996 (aged 18)			(Royal Spanish Football Federation) Getafe
20	DF	Facundo Monteseirín	12 March 1995 (aged 20)			(Argentine Football Association) Lanús
21	DF	Rodrigo Moreira	15 July 1996 (aged 18)			(Argentine Football Association) Independiente

=== Panama ===
Head coach: (Argentina) Leonardo Pipino

No.	Pos.	Player	Date of birth (age)	Caps	Goals	Club
1	GK	Jaime de Gracia	11 May 1996 (aged 19)			(Panamanian Football Federation) Tauro
2	DF	**Chin Hormechea**	12 May 1996 (aged 19)			(Panamanian Football Federation) Árabe Unido
3	DF	**Kevin Galván**	10 March 1996 (aged 19)			(Panamanian Football Federation) Sporting San Miguelito
4	DF	**Michael Amir Murillo**	12 May 1996 (aged 19)			(Panamanian Football Federation) San Francisco
5	MF	**Francisco Narbón**	11 February 1995 (aged 20)			(United States Soccer Federation) James Madison Dukes
6	DF	**Fidel Escobar**	9 January 1995 (aged 20)			(Panamanian Football Federation) Sporting San Miguelito
7	MF	Julian Velarde	18 September 1996 (aged 18)			(Panamanian Football Federation) Chorrillo
8	MF	**Luis Pereira**	27 March 1996 (aged 19)			(Panamanian Football Federation) Árabe Unido
9	FW	**Ismael Díaz**	12 May 1997 (aged 18)			(Panamanian Football Federation) Tauro
10	MF	Jhamal Rodríguez	28 January 1995 (aged 20)			(Panamanian Football Federation) Chorrillo
11	FW	Ervin Zorrilla	14 May 1996 (aged 19)			(Panamanian Football Federation) San Francisco
12	GK	Martin Meléndez	23 March 1995 (aged 20)			(Panamanian Football Federation) San Francisco
13	DF	Christopher Bared	13 March 1996 (aged 19)			(United States Soccer Federation) Villanova Wildcats
14	DF	Jesús Araya	3 January 1996 (aged 19)			(Panamanian Football Federation) Tauro
15	MF	**Adalberto Carrasquilla**	28 November 1998 (aged 16)			(Panamanian Football Federation) Tauro
16	MF	**Edson Samms**	27 March 1995 (aged 20)			(Panamanian Football Federation) Sporting San Miguelito
17	MF	**Justin Simons**	19 September 1997 (aged 17)			(Panamanian Football Federation) Sporting San Miguelito
18	FW	**Carlos Small**	13 March 1995 (aged 20)			(Panamanian Football Federation) Sporting San Miguelito
19	FW	Jesús González	25 July 1996 (aged 18)			(Panamanian Football Federation) Sporting San Miguelito
20	FW	Rubén Barrow	28 April 1995 (aged 20)			(Panamanian Football Federation) Tauro
21	GK	Carlos Secaida	4 April 1995 (aged 20)			(Panamanian Football Federation) Chorrillo

=== Ghana ===
Head coach: (Ghana) Sellas Tetteh

No.	Pos.	Player	Date of birth (age)	Caps	Goals	Club
1	GK	**Lawrence Ati-Zigi**	29 November 1996 (aged 18)			(Austrian Football Association) Red Bull Salzburg
2	DF	Emmanuel Ntim	12 March 1996 (aged 19)			(French Football Federation) Valenciennes
3	DF	Patrick Kpozo	15 July 1997 (aged 17)			(Ghana Football Association) Inter Allies
4	DF	Joseph Bempah	5 September 1995 (aged 19)			(Ghana Football Association) Hearts of Oak
5	DF	Kingsley Fobi	20 September 1998 (aged 16)			(Ghana Football Association) Right to Dream Academy
6	MF	**Godfred Donsah**	7 June 1996 (aged 18)			(Italian Football Federation) Cagliari
7	FW	**Samuel Tetteh**	28 July 1996 (aged 18)			(Ghana Football Association) West African Football Academy
8	MF	Kofi Yeboah	14 May 1995 (aged 20)			(Ghana Football Association) Wa All Stars
9	FW	**Emmanuel Boateng**	23 May 1996 (aged 19)			(Portuguese Football Federation) Rio Ave
10	FW	Clifford Aboagye	11 February 1995 (aged 20)			(Royal Spanish Football Federation) Granada
11	MF	Asiedu Attobrah	15 March 1995 (aged 20)			(Ghana Football Association) New Edubiase United
12	GK	Kwame Baah	21 April 1998 (aged 17)			(Ghana Football Association) Hearts of Lions
13	MF	David Atanga	25 December 1996 (aged 18)			(Austrian Football Association) Red Bull Salzburg
14	DF	**Joseph Aidoo**	29 September 1995 (aged 19)			(Ghana Football Association) Inter Allies
15	DF	Joseph Adjei	20 August 1995 (aged 19)			(Ghana Football Association) Wa All Stars
16	GK	Mutawakilu Seidu	8 August 1995 (aged 19)			(Ghana Football Association) Hearts of Oak
17	FW	**Yaw Yeboah**	28 March 1997 (aged 18)			(The Football Association) Manchester City
18	MF	Barnes Osei	8 January 1995 (aged 20)			(Portuguese Football Federation) Paços de Ferreira
19	FW	**Benjamin Tetteh**	10 July 1997 (aged 17)			(Ghana Football Association) Tudu Mighty Jets
20	FW	Prosper Kasim	15 December 1996 (aged 18)			(Ghana Football Association) Inter Allies
21	DF	**Patrick Asmah**	25 January 1996 (aged 19)			(Ghana Football Association) BA Stars

=== Austria ===
Head coach: (Austria) Andreas Heraf

No.	Pos.	Player	Date of birth (age)	Caps	Goals	Club
1	GK	Tino Casali	14 November 1995 (aged 19)			(Austrian Football Association) Austria Wien
2	MF	Marcus Maier	18 December 1995 (aged 19)			(Austrian Football Association) Admira Wacker Mödling
3	DF	Daniel Rosenbichler	10 July 1995 (aged 19)			(Austrian Football Association) Admira Wacker Mödling
4	DF	Lukas Gugganig	14 February 1995 (aged 20)			(Austrian Football Association) Red Bull Salzburg
5	DF	**Philipp Lienhart**	11 July 1996 (aged 18)			(Royal Spanish Football Federation) Real Madrid
6	DF	Francesco Lovrić	5 October 1995 (aged 19)			(German Football Association) VfB Stuttgart
7	FW	Jakob Kreuzer	15 January 1995 (aged 20)			(Austrian Football Association) SV Ried
8	MF	Peter Michorl	9 May 1995 (aged 20)			(Austrian Football Association) LASK Linz
9	FW	Valentin Grubeck	9 August 1995 (aged 19)			(Austrian Football Association) SV Horn
10	MF	Markus Blutsch	1 June 1995 (aged 19)			(Austrian Football Association) Admira Wacker Mödling
11	MF	Andreas Gruber	29 June 1996 (aged 18)			(Austrian Football Association) Sturm Graz
12	GK	Stefan Mitmasser	13 May 1995 (aged 20)			(Austrian Football Association) SV Horn
13	DF	Michael Brandner	13 February 1995 (aged 20)			(Austrian Football Association) FC Liefering
14	FW	Bernd Gschweidl	9 August 1995 (aged 19)			(Austrian Football Association) SV Grödig
15	DF	Patrick Puchegger	4 May 1995 (aged 20)			(German Football Association) Bayern Munich
16	DF	Alexander Joppich	19 January 1995 (aged 20)			(Austrian Football Association) FC Liefering
17	MF	**Konrad Laimer**	27 May 1997 (aged 18)			(Austrian Football Association) Red Bull Salzburg
18	MF	Martin Rasner	18 May 1995 (aged 20)			(Austrian Football Association) FC Liefering
19	FW	Thomas Gösweiner	3 March 1995 (aged 20)			(Austrian Football Association) Admira Wacker Mödling
20	MF	**Florian Grillitsch**	7 August 1995 (aged 19)			(German Football Association) Werder Bremen
21	GK	Johannes Kreidl	7 March 1996 (aged 19)			(German Football Association) Hamburger SV

== Group C ==
=== Qatar ===
Head coach: (Spain) Félix Sánchez Bas

No.	Pos.	Player	Date of birth (age)	Caps	Goals	Club
1	GK	**Yousef Hassan**	24 May 1996 (aged 19)			(Royal Belgian Football Association) Eupen
2	DF	**Tameem Al-Muhaza**	21 July 1996 (aged 18)			(Qatar Football Association) Al-Gharafa
3	DF	**Fahad Al-Abdulrahman**	6 April 1995 (aged 20)			(Royal Belgian Football Association) Eupen
4	MF	**Abdullah Al-Ahrak**	10 May 1997 (aged 18)			(Qatar Football Association) Lekhwiya
5	DF	Serigne Abdou Thiam	28 February 1995 (aged 20)			(Qatar Football Association) Al-Khor
6	DF	**Salem Al-Hajri**	10 April 1996 (aged 19)			(Qatar Football Association) Al-Sadd
7	FW	Jassem Al-Jalabi	21 February 1996 (aged 19)			(Austrian Football Association) LASK Linz
8	MF	**Ahmed Moein**	20 October 1995 (aged 19)			(Royal Belgian Football Association) Eupen
9	MF	Said Brahmi	11 July 1995 (aged 19)			(Qatar Football Association) Al-Khor
10	MF	**Akram Afif**	18 November 1996 (aged 18)			(Royal Belgian Football Association) Eupen
11	DF	Sultan Al Kuwari	3 August 1995 (aged 19)			(Royal Spanish Football Federation) Villarreal
12	DF	Jassem Mohammed Omar	18 April 1995 (aged 20)			(Austrian Football Association) LASK Linz
13	GK	**Mohammed Al-Bakri**	28 March 1997 (aged 18)			(Qatar Football Association) Lekhwiya
14	MF	Ahmed Al Saadi	29 October 1995 (aged 19)			(Royal Belgian Football Association) Eupen
15	DF	Sultan Al-Brake	7 April 1996 (aged 19)			(Qatar Football Association) Al-Wakrah
16	MF	Abdurahman Enad	6 September 1996 (aged 18)			(Qatar Football Association) Al-Rayyan
17	DF	**Bassam Al-Rawi**	16 December 1997 (aged 17)			(Qatar Football Association) Al-Rayyan
18	MF	**Assim Madibo**	22 October 1996 (aged 18)			(Austrian Football Association) LASK Linz
19	FW	**Almoez Ali**	19 August 1996 (aged 18)			(Royal Belgian Football Association) Eupen
20	MF	**Tarek Salman**	5 December 1997 (aged 17)			(Qatar Football Association) Lekhwiya
21	GK	Yazan Naim	5 June 1997 (aged 17)			(Qatar Football Association) Al-Ahli

=== Colombia ===
Head coach: (Colombia) Carlos Restrepo

No.	Pos.	Player	Date of birth (age)	Caps	Goals	Club
1	GK	**Álvaro Montero**	29 March 1995 (aged 20)			(Brazilian Football Confederation) São Caetano
2	DF	Aldayr Hernández	4 August 1995 (aged 19)			(Colombian Football Federation) Bogotá
3	DF	Jeison Angulo	27 June 1996 (aged 18)			(Colombian Football Federation) Deportivo Cali
4	DF	Daniel Londoño	1 January 1995 (aged 20)			(Colombian Football Federation) Envigado
5	DF	Juan Sebastián Quintero	23 March 1995 (aged 20)			(Colombian Football Federation) Deportivo Cali
6	MF	Andrés Tello	6 September 1996 (aged 18)			(Italian Football Federation) Juventus
7	MF	Deinner Quiñones	16 August 1995 (aged 19)			(Colombian Football Federation) Deportes Quindío
8	MF	Alexis Zapata	10 May 1995 (aged 20)			(Italian Football Federation) Udinese
9	MF	Joao Rodríguez	19 May 1996 (aged 19)			(Portuguese Football Federation) Vitória de Setúbal
10	MF	Sergio Villarreal^{it}	29 January 1995 (aged 20)			(Colombian Football Federation) Millonarios
11	FW	Jeison Lucumí	8 April 1995 (aged 20)			(Colombian Football Federation) América
12	GK	Luis Erney Vásquez	1 March 1996 (aged 19)			(Colombian Football Federation) Independiente Medellín
13	DF	**Davinson Sánchez**	12 June 1996 (aged 18)			(Colombian Football Federation) Atlético Nacional
14	MF	Rodin Quiñones	30 May 1995 (aged 20)			(Colombian Football Federation) Atlético Nacional
15	MF	Sebastián Ayala	14 September 1995 (aged 19)			(Colombian Football Federation) La Equidad
16	MF	Jarlan Barrera	16 September 1995 (aged 19)			(Colombian Football Federation) Junior
17	FW	Juan Ferney Otero	26 May 1995 (aged 20)			(Colombian Football Federation) Fortaleza
18	FW	Carlos Ibargüen	7 October 1995 (aged 19)			(Colombian Football Federation) Cortuluá
19	MF	Víctor Guillermo Gutiérrez	20 April 1996 (aged 19)			(Brazilian Football Confederation) Atlético Paranaense
20	FW	**Rafael Santos Borré**	15 September 1995 (aged 19)			(Colombian Football Federation) Deportivo Cali
21	GK	Yasser Chávez	5 March 1995 (aged 20)			(Colombian Football Federation) Bogotá

=== Portugal ===
Head coach: (Portugal) Hélio Sousa

No.	Pos.	Player	Date of birth (age)	Caps	Goals	Club
1	GK	Tiago Sá	11 January 1995 (aged 20)	2	0	(Portuguese Football Federation) SC Braga B
2	DF	Pedro Rebocho	23 January 1995 (aged 20)	2	0	(Portuguese Football Federation) Benfica B
3	DF	João Nunes	19 November 1995 (aged 19)	2	0	(Portuguese Football Federation) Benfica B
4	DF	Nélson Monte	30 July 1995 (aged 19)	2	0	(Portuguese Football Federation) Rio Ave
5	DF	Rafa Soares	9 May 1995 (aged 20)	1	0	(Portuguese Football Federation) Porto B
6	MF	Tomás Podstawski	30 January 1995 (aged 20)	3	0	(Portuguese Football Federation) Porto B
7	MF	Raphael Guzzo	6 January 1995 (aged 20)	3	0	(Portuguese Football Federation) Chaves
8	MF	Chico Ramos	10 April 1995 (aged 20)	3	0	(Portuguese Football Federation) Porto B
9	FW	**André Silva**	6 November 1995 (aged 19)	3	4	(Portuguese Football Federation) Porto B
10	MF	**Rony Lopes**	28 December 1995 (aged 19)	0	0	(French Football Federation) Lille
11	FW	Nuno Santos	13 February 1995 (aged 20)	3	0	(Portuguese Football Federation) Benfica B
12	GK	André Moreira	2 December 1995 (aged 19)	2	0	(Portuguese Football Federation) Moreirense
13	DF	Mauro Riquicho	4 July 1995 (aged 19)	2	0	(Portuguese Football Federation) Sporting CP B
14	DF	**Domingos Duarte**	10 March 1995 (aged 20)	3	0	(Portuguese Football Federation) Sporting CP B
15	MF	**Estrela**	22 September 1995 (aged 19)	3	0	(United States Soccer Federation) Orlando City SC
16	MF	**Janio Bikel**	28 June 1995 (aged 19)	2	0	(Royal Dutch Football Association) Heerenveen
17	FW	Ivo Rodrigues	30 March 1995 (aged 20)	3	2	(Portuguese Football Federation) Vitória de Guimarães
18	FW	**Gelson Martins**	11 May 1995 (aged 20)	3	1	(Portuguese Football Federation) Sporting CP B
19	FW	João Vigário	15 August 1995 (aged 19)	3	0	(Portuguese Football Federation) Vitória de Guimarães B
20	FW	**Gonçalo Guedes**	29 November 1996 (aged 18)	1	0	(Portuguese Football Federation) Benfica B
21	GK	Guilherme Oliveira	12 April 1995 (aged 20)	1	0	(Portuguese Football Federation) Sporting CP B

1. Nélson Monte was called up before the tournament began due to an injury to Dinis Almeida.

=== Senegal ===
Head coach: (Spain) Juan Gallo

No.	Pos.	Player	Date of birth (age)	Caps	Goals	Club
1	GK	Khadime N'Diaye	27 May 1996 (aged 19)			(Portuguese Football Federation) Sporting CP
2	MF	Abdoulaye N'Dione	14 December 1997 (aged 17)			(Senegalese Football Federation) Excellence Foot
3	DF	Andelinou Correa	31 December 1996 (aged 18)			(Senegalese Football Federation) Dakar Sacré-Cœur
4	DF	Mouhameth Sané	26 January 1996 (aged 19)			(French Football Federation) Dijon
5	FW	Papa Diene Faye	30 November 1996 (aged 18)			(Senegalese Football Federation) Mbour Petite Côte
6	DF	**Elimane Oumar Cissé**	12 March 1995 (aged 20)			(Senegalese Football Federation) Diambars
7	FW	Ibrahima Wadji	5 May 1995 (aged 20)			(Senegalese Football Federation) Mbour Petite Côte
8	MF	**Sidy Sarr**	5 June 1996 (aged 18)			(Senegalese Football Federation) Mbour Petite Côte
9	DF	**Pape Abou Cissé**	14 September 1995 (aged 19)			(French Football Federation) Ajaccio
10	MF	Fallou Niang	1 May 1995 (aged 20)			(Tunisian Football Federation) CS Sfaxien
11	FW	**El Hadj Malick Niang**	9 December 1995 (aged 19)			(Senegalese Football Federation) US Gorée
12	MF	**Mamadou Loum**	30 December 1996 (aged 18)			(Senegalese Football Federation) US Ouakam
13	DF	**Alhassane Sylla**	24 August 1995 (aged 19)			(Senegalese Football Federation) Diambars
14	FW	Moussa Koné	30 December 1996 (aged 18)			(Senegalese Football Federation) Dakar Sacré-Cœur
15	DF	**Moussa Wagué**	4 October 1998 (aged 16)			(Qatar Football Association) Aspire Academy
16	GK	Seydou Sy	12 December 1995 (aged 19)			(French Football Federation) AS Monaco
17	MF	Roger Gomis	20 March 1995 (aged 20)			(French Football Federation) CS Louhans-Cuiseaux
18	MF	Alassane Sow	3 January 1997 (aged 18)			(Royal Spanish Football Federation) Real Zaragoza
19	FW	Mamadou Thiam	20 March 1995 (aged 20)			(French Football Federation) Dijon
20	MF	Remy Nassalan	15 February 1996 (aged 19)			(Senegalese Football Federation) N'Dangane
21	GK	Ibrahima Sy	13 August 1995 (aged 19)			(French Football Federation) Lorient

== Group D ==
=== Mexico ===
Head coach: (Mexico) Sergio Almaguer

No.	Pos.	Player	Date of birth (age)	Caps	Goals	Club
1	GK	Jesse González	26 May 1995 (aged 20)			(United States Soccer Federation) FC Dallas
2	DF	Kevin Gutiérrez	1 March 1995 (aged 20)			(Mexican Football Federation) Querétaro
3	DF	Óscar Bernal	28 September 1995 (aged 19)			(Mexican Football Federation) Santos Laguna
4	DF	Rodrigo González	12 April 1995 (aged 20)			(Mexican Football Federation) BUAP
5	MF	Sergio Flores	12 February 1995 (aged 20)			(Mexican Football Federation) Guadalajara
6	MF	**Víctor Guzmán**	3 February 1995 (aged 20)			(Mexican Football Federation) Guadalajara
7	MF	**Érick Gutiérrez** (c)	17 June 1995 (aged 19)			(Mexican Football Federation) Pachuca
8	MF	**Hirving Lozano**	30 July 1995 (aged 19)			(Mexican Football Federation) Pachuca
9	FW	**Guillermo Martínez**	15 March 1995 (aged 20)			(Mexican Football Federation) Pachuca
10	FW	Alejandro Díaz	27 January 1996 (aged 19)			(Mexican Football Federation) América
11	MF	**David Ramírez**	14 December 1995 (aged 19)			(Mexican Football Federation) Guadalajara
12	GK	Edson Reséndez	12 January 1996 (aged 19)			(Mexican Football Federation) Monterrey
13	DF	Carlos Arreola	4 March 1995 (aged 20)			(Mexican Football Federation) Atlas
14	DF	**Érick Aguirre**	23 February 1997 (aged 18)			(Mexican Football Federation) Morelia
15	MF	**Orbelín Pineda**	24 March 1996 (aged 19)			(Mexican Football Federation) Querétaro
16	DF	**Osvaldo Rodríguez**	10 September 1996 (aged 18)			(Mexican Football Federation) Pachuca
17	MF	Luis Márquez	12 February 1995 (aged 20)			(Mexican Football Federation) Guadalajara
18	FW	Diego Gama	14 April 1996 (aged 19)			(Royal Spanish Football Federation) Atlético de Madrid B
19	FW	Diego Pineda	7 April 1995 (aged 20)			(Mexican Football Federation) América
20	MF	**Mauro Lainez**	9 May 1996 (aged 19)			(Mexican Football Federation) Pachuca
21	GK	**Raúl Gudiño**	22 April 1996 (aged 19)			(Portuguese Football Federation) Porto B

=== Mali ===
Head coach: (Mali) Fanyeri Diarra

No.	Pos.	Player	Date of birth (age)	Caps	Goals	Club
1	GK	Mahammane Baye	8 October 1996 (aged 18)			(Malian Football Federation) AS Avenir
2	FW	Mohammed Diallo	11 March 1996 (aged 19)			(Royal Moroccan Football Federation) MC Oujda
3	MF	**Souleymane Diarra**	30 January 1995 (aged 20)			(Royal Moroccan Football Federation) Wydad Casablanca
4	DF	**Youssouf Koné**	5 July 1995 (aged 19)			(French Football Federation) Lille OSC
5	DF	Ichaka Diarra	18 January 1995 (aged 20)			(Malian Football Federation) Djoliba AC
6	DF	Hamidou Maïga	2 January 1997 (aged 18)			(Malian Football Federation) Djoliba AC
7	FW	Lassine Konaté	21 February 1997 (aged 18)			(French Football Federation) Stade Lavallois
8	MF	**Diadie Samassékou**	11 January 1996 (aged 19)			(Malian Football Federation) AS Real Bamako
9	MF	**Saliou Guindo**	12 September 1996 (aged 18)			(Ivorian Football Federation) ASEC Mimosas
10	FW	**Hamidou Traoré**	7 October 1996 (aged 18)			(Turkish Football Federation) Elazığspor
11	FW	Malick Touré	22 September 1995 (aged 19)			(Tunisian Football Federation) Club Africain
12	DF	**Souleymane Coulibaly**	8 August 1996 (aged 18)			(Malian Football Federation) AS Real Bamako
13	DF	**Aboubacar Doumbia**	19 April 1995 (aged 20)			(Malian Football Federation) AS Real Bamako
14	FW	Alassane Diallo	19 February 1995 (aged 20)			(Royal Belgian Football Association) Westerlo
15	FW	Souleymane Sissoko	10 April 1996 (aged 19)			(Malian Football Federation) Onze Créateurs de Niaréla
16	GK	**Djigui Diarra**	27 February 1995 (aged 20)			(Malian Football Federation) Stade Malien
17	DF	**Falaye Sacko**	1 May 1995 (aged 20)			(Malian Football Federation) Djoliba AC
18	MF	Dieudonné Gbakle	20 December 1995 (aged 19)			(French Football Federation) Lille
19	FW	**Adama Traoré**	28 June 1995 (aged 19)			(French Football Federation) Lille
20	MF	**Fousseni Diabaté**	18 October 1995 (aged 19)			(French Football Federation) Reims
21	GK	Sory Traoré	24 January 1996 (aged 19)			(Malian Football Federation) AS Bamako

=== Uruguay ===
Head coach: (Uruguay) Fabián Coito

No.	Pos.	Player	Date of birth (age)	Caps	Goals	Club
1	GK	Thiago Cardozo	31 July 1996 (aged 18)			(Uruguayan Football Association) Peñarol
2	DF	Agustín Ale	19 February 1995 (aged 20)			(Uruguayan Football Association) River Plate
3	DF	Cristian Tassano	23 July 1996 (aged 18)			(Uruguayan Football Association) Danubio
4	DF	**Mauricio Lemos**	28 December 1995 (aged 19)			(Uruguayan Football Association) Defensor Sporting
5	MF	**Nahitan Nández**	28 December 1995 (aged 19)			(Uruguayan Football Association) Peñarol
6	MF	Diego Poyet	8 April 1995 (aged 20)			(The Football Association) West Ham United
7	MF	Facundo Castro	22 January 1995 (aged 20)			(Uruguayan Football Association) Defensor Sporting
8	MF	**Mauro Arambarri**	30 September 1995 (aged 19)			(Uruguayan Football Association) Defensor Sporting
9	FW	Jaime Báez	25 April 1995 (aged 20)			(Uruguayan Football Association) Defensor Sporting
10	FW	**Gastón Pereiro**	11 June 1995 (aged 19)			(Uruguayan Football Association) Nacional
11	FW	Franco Acosta	5 March 1995 (aged 20)			(Royal Spanish Football Federation) Villarreal
12	GK	Gastón Guruceaga	15 March 1995 (aged 20)			(Uruguayan Football Association) Peñarol
13	DF	**Marcelo Saracchi**	23 April 1998 (aged 17)			(Uruguayan Football Association) Danubio
14	DF	Enrique Etcheverry	10 May 1996 (aged 19)			(Uruguayan Football Association) Defensor Sporting
15	FW	Kevin Méndez	10 January 1996 (aged 19)			(Italian Football Federation) Perugia
16	MF	Ramiro Guerra	21 March 1997 (aged 18)			(Royal Spanish Football Federation) Villarreal
17	DF	**Mathías Suárez**	24 June 1996 (aged 18)			(Uruguayan Football Association) Defensor Sporting
18	DF	Guillermo Cotugno	12 March 1995 (aged 20)			(Russian Football Union) Rubin Kazan
19	DF	Erick Cabaco	19 April 1995 (aged 20)			(Uruguayan Football Association) Rentistas
20	MF	Rodrigo Amaral	25 March 1997 (aged 18)			(Uruguayan Football Association) Nacional
21	GK	Michel Tabárez	29 July 1995 (aged 19)			(Uruguayan Football Association) Fénix

=== Serbia ===
Head coach: (Serbia) Veljko Paunović

No.	Pos.	Player	Date of birth (age)	Caps	Goals	Club
1	GK	**Predrag Rajković** (c)	31 October 1995 (aged 19)	8	0	(Football Association of Serbia) Red Star
2	DF	**Andrija Lazović**	16 January 1995 (aged 20)	9	0	(The Football Association) Fulham FC
3	DF	Nemanja Antonov	6 May 1995 (aged 20)	12	0	(Football Association of Serbia) OFK Beograd
4	MF	**Saša Zdjelar**	20 March 1995 (aged 20)	12	0	(Football Association of Serbia) OFK Beograd
5	DF	**Miloš Veljković**	26 September 1995 (aged 19)	8	1	(The Football Association) Tottenham Hotspur
6	DF	**Srđan Babić**	22 April 1996 (aged 19)	10	0	(Football Association of Serbia) Vojvodina
7	FW	Ivan Šaponjić	2 August 1997 (aged 17)	9	2	(Football Association of Serbia) Partizan
8	MF	**Nemanja Maksimović**	26 January 1995 (aged 20)	7	2	(Kazakhstan Football Federation) Astana
9	FW	**Staniša Mandić**	27 January 1995 (aged 20)	12	3	(Football Association of Serbia) Čukarički
10	MF	**Mijat Gaćinović**	8 February 1995 (aged 20)	10	0	(Football Association of Serbia) Vojvodina
11	MF	**Andrija Živković**	11 July 1996 (aged 18)	9	2	(Football Association of Serbia) Partizan
12	GK	**Filip Manojlović**	25 April 1996 (aged 19)	1	0	(Football Association of Serbia) Red Star
13	DF	Stefan Milošević	7 April 1995 (aged 20)	5	0	(Football Association of Serbia) Spartak Subotica
14	DF	Vukašin Jovanović	17 May 1996 (aged 19)	5	0	(Football Association of Serbia) Red Star
15	DF	Miladin Stevanović	11 February 1996 (aged 19)	10	1	(Football Association of Serbia) Partizan
16	MF	**Marko Grujić**	13 April 1996 (aged 19)	7	0	(Football Association of Serbia) Red Star
17	DF	Radovan Pankov	5 August 1995 (aged 19)	4	0	(Football Association of Serbia) Vojvodina
18	MF	Filip Janković	17 January 1995 (aged 20)	4	1	(Italian Football Federation) Catania
19	FW	Stefan Ilić	7 April 1995 (aged 20)	5	3	(Football Association of Serbia) Spartak Subotica
20	MF	**Sergej Milinković-Savić**	27 February 1995 (aged 20)	11	1	(Royal Belgian Football Association) Genk
21	GK	**Vanja Milinković-Savić**	20 February 1997 (aged 18)	0	0	(Football Association of Serbia) Vojvodina

== Group E ==
=== Nigeria ===
Head coach: (Nigeria) Manu Garba

No.	Pos.	Player	Date of birth (age)	Caps	Goals	Club
1	GK	Joshua Enaholo	24 July 1996 (aged 18)	8	0	(Nigeria Football Federation) MFM
2	DF	**Musa Muhammed**	31 October 1996 (aged 18)	10	5	(Turkish Football Federation) İstanbul Başakşehir
3	DF	Mustapha Abdullahi	18 January 1996 (aged 19)	11	0	(Nigeria Football Federation) Spotlight
4	MF	Akinjide Idowu	9 September 1996 (aged 18)	12	0	(Nigeria Football Federation) Mutunchi Football Academy
5	MF	**Wilfred Ndidi**	16 December 1996 (aged 18)	11	0	(Royal Belgian Football Association) Genk
6	DF	Prince Izu Omego	15 August 1996 (aged 18)	10	0	(Nigeria Football Federation) Standard Academy
7	MF	Bernard Bulbwa	11 October 1996 (aged 18)	8	1	(Tunisian Football Federation) Espérance
8	MF	**Kingsley Sokari**	30 May 1995 (aged 20)	0	0	(Nigeria Football Federation) Enyimba
9	FW	**Isaac Success**	7 January 1996 (aged 19)	0	0	(Royal Spanish Football Federation) Granada
10	FW	**Kelechi Iheanacho**	3 October 1996 (aged 18)	3	0	(The Football Association) Manchester City
11	FW	Musa Yahaya	16 December 1997 (aged 17)	7	3	(The Football Association) Tottenham Hotspur
12	MF	**Ifeanyi Ifeanyi**	15 August 1995 (aged 19)	7	0	(Nigeria Football Federation) Water FC
13	MF	Saviour Godwin	22 August 1996 (aged 18)	0	0	(Nigeria Football Federation) FC Sports
14	MF	Chidiebere Nwakali	26 December 1996 (aged 18)	2	0	(The Football Association) Manchester City
15	MF	Ifeanyi Mathew	20 January 1997 (aged 18)	11	3	(Nigeria Football Federation) El-Kanemi Warriors
16	GK	**Dele Alampasu**	24 December 1996 (aged 18)	0	0	(Royal Belgian Football Association) Genk Academy
17	FW	Chidera Ezeh	2 October 1997 (aged 17)	4	2	(Portuguese Football Federation) Porto
18	FW	**Taiwo Awoniyi**	12 August 1997 (aged 17)	12	5	(Swedish Football Association) Kalmar FF
19	DF	Zaharaddeen Bello	17 December 1997 (aged 17)	8	0	(Nigeria Football Federation) Dabo Babes
20	FW	**Moses Simon**	12 July 1995 (aged 19)	3	0	(Royal Belgian Football Association) Gent
21	GK	Olorunleke Ojo	17 August 1995 (aged 19)	3	0	(Nigeria Football Federation) Giwa

=== Brazil ===
Alexandre Gallo was Brazil's coach when the players list was released. He was eventually fired on 8 May and replaced by Rogério Micale. Kenedy was forced out of the squad due to appendicitis and Malcom was called as his replacement on May 17.

Head coach: (Brazil) Rogério Micale

No.	Pos.	Player	Date of birth (age)	Caps	Goals	Club
1	GK	Marcos Felipe	13 April 1996 (aged 19)			(Brazilian Football Confederation) Fluminense
2	DF	João Pedro	15 November 1996 (aged 18)			(Brazilian Football Confederation) Palmeiras
3	DF	Lucão	23 March 1996 (aged 19)			(Brazilian Football Confederation) São Paulo
4	DF	Marlon Santos	7 September 1995 (aged 19)			(Brazilian Football Confederation) Fluminense
5	MF	Danilo Barbosa	28 February 1996 (aged 19)			(Portuguese Football Federation) Braga
6	DF	Caju	17 July 1995 (aged 19)			(Brazilian Football Confederation) Santos
7	FW	Marcos Guilherme	5 August 1995 (aged 19)			(Brazilian Football Confederation) Atlético Paranaense
8	MF	Gabriel Boschilia	5 March 1996 (aged 19)			(Brazilian Football Confederation) São Paulo
9	FW	Judivan	21 May 1995 (aged 20)			(Brazilian Football Confederation) Cruzeiro
10	MF	**Gabriel Jesus**	3 April 1997 (aged 18)			(Brazilian Football Confederation) Palmeiras
11	FW	**Malcom**	26 February 1997 (aged 18)			(Brazilian Football Confederation) Corinthians
12	GK	Georgemy	15 August 1995 (aged 19)			(Brazilian Football Confederation) Cruzeiro
13	DF	Rodrigo Ramos	24 May 1995 (aged 20)			(Brazilian Football Confederation) Coritiba
14	DF	Iago Maidana	6 February 1996 (aged 19)			(Brazilian Football Confederation) Criciúma
15	DF	**Léo Pereira**	31 January 1996 (aged 19)			(Brazilian Football Confederation) Atlético Paranaense
16	DF	**Jorge**	28 March 1996 (aged 19)			(Brazilian Football Confederation) Flamengo
17	MF	Alef	28 January 1995 (aged 20)			(French Football Federation) Marseille
18	MF	**Andreas Pereira**	1 January 1996 (aged 19)			(The Football Association) Manchester United
19	MF	Jajá	18 March 1995 (aged 20)			(Brazilian Football Confederation) Flamengo
20	FW	Jean Carlos	10 May 1996 (aged 19)			(Royal Spanish Football Federation) Real Madrid
21	GK	Jean	26 October 1995 (aged 19)			(Brazilian Football Confederation) Bahia

=== North Korea ===
Head coach: (North Korea) An Ye-gun

No.	Pos.	Player	Date of birth (age)	Caps	Goals	Club
1	GK	Ri In-hak	1 January 1997 (aged 18)			(DPR Korea Football Association) Amrokgang
2	DF	Jang Kum-nam	5 November 1995 (aged 19)			(DPR Korea Football Association) April 25
3	DF	Min Hyo-song	19 January 1995 (aged 20)			(DPR Korea Football Association) April 25
4	DF	Jon Kum-dong	25 April 1995 (aged 20)			(DPR Korea Football Association) Rimyongsu
5	FW	**Choe Ju-song**	27 January 1996 (aged 19)			(DPR Korea Football Association) Amrokgang
6	DF	Ro Myong-song	2 January 1995 (aged 20)			(DPR Korea Football Association) Rimyongsu
7	MF	Kang Nam-gwon	6 March 1995 (aged 20)			(DPR Korea Football Association) Chobyong
8	MF	**Ri Un-chol**	13 July 1995 (aged 19)			(DPR Korea Football Association) Sonbong
9	FW	**Kim Yu-song**	24 January 1995 (aged 20)			(DPR Korea Football Association) April 25
10	MF	Kim Chol-min	21 September 1995 (aged 19)			(DPR Korea Football Association) Pyongyang City
11	MF	Pak Chol-song	2 July 1995 (aged 19)			(DPR Korea Football Association) Hwaebul
12	MF	Kim Kwang-jin	3 July 1995 (aged 19)			(DPR Korea Football Association) Hwaebul
13	MF	Jo Kwang-myong	3 January 1995 (aged 20)			(DPR Korea Football Association) April 25
14	FW	Kim Chol-jae	1 September 1996 (aged 18)			(DPR Korea Football Association) April 25
15	DF	Kim Kuk-chol	13 January 1995 (aged 20)			(DPR Korea Football Association) Hwaebul
16	MF	Kim Song-sun	31 December 1995 (aged 19)			(Japan Football Association) Korea University
17	DF	Ri Kyong-jin	13 November 1995 (aged 19)			(DPR Korea Football Association) Pyongyang City
18	GK	Cha Jong-hun	19 April 1995 (aged 20)			(DPR Korea Football Association) Pyongyang City
19	FW	**Jo Sol-song**	27 October 1995 (aged 19)			(DPR Korea Football Association) Pyongyang City
20	FW	So Jong-hyok	1 July 1995 (aged 19)			(DPR Korea Football Association) April 25
21	GK	Son Chol-ryong	12 July 1995 (aged 19)			(DPR Korea Football Association) April 25

=== Hungary ===
The squad was announced on 15 May 2015.

Head coach: (Germany) Bernd Storck

No.	Pos.	Player	Date of birth (age)	Caps	Goals	Club
1	GK	György Székely	2 June 1995 (aged 19)	2	0	(Hungarian Football Federation) Újbuda
2	DF	**Attila Osváth**	10 December 1995 (aged 19)	5	1	(Hungarian Football Federation) Szigetszentmiklósi TK
3	DF	Krisztián Tamás	18 April 1995 (aged 20)	4	0	(Football Association of the Czech Republic) Slavia Prague
4	DF	**Ákos Kecskés** (c)	4 January 1996 (aged 19)	3	0	(Italian Football Federation) Atalanta
5	DF	Bence Lenzsér	9 April 1996 (aged 19)	2	1	(Hungarian Football Federation) Paksi
6	MF	Viktor Pongrácz	18 September 1995 (aged 19)	2	0	(Hungarian Football Federation) Lombard-Pápa
7	FW	László Oláh	16 December 1995 (aged 19)	2	1	(Hungarian Football Federation) Vasas
8	MF	**Máté Vida**	8 March 1996 (aged 19)	2	0	(Hungarian Football Federation) Vasas
9	FW	Bence Mervó	5 March 1995 (aged 20)	5	1	(Hungarian Football Federation) Győri ETO
10	MF	Márió Németh	1 May 1995 (aged 20)	3	2	(Hungarian Football Federation) Szombathelyi Haladás
11	FW	Donát Zsótér	6 January 1996 (aged 19)	3	2	(Hungarian Football Federation) Puskás Akadémia
12	GK	Dániel Horváth	25 January 1996 (aged 19)	0	0	(Hungarian Football Federation) Győri ETO
13	MF	**Zsolt Kalmár**	9 June 1995 (aged 19)	2	1	(German Football Association) RB Leipzig
14	FW	**Dominik Nagy**	8 May 1995 (aged 20)	4	2	(Hungarian Football Federation) Ferencváros
15	DF	Attila Talabér	29 May 1996 (aged 19)	1	0	(Hungarian Football Federation) MTK Budapest
16	GK	Patrik Demjén	22 March 1998 (aged 17)	1	0	(Hungarian Football Federation) MTK Budapest
17	MF	**Ádám Nagy**	17 June 1995 (aged 19)	1	0	(Hungarian Football Federation) Ferencváros
18	MF	**Zsombor Berecz**	13 December 1995 (aged 19)	4	0	(Hungarian Football Federation) Vasas
19	FW	Patrik Popov	12 October 1997 (aged 17)	1	0	(Hungarian Football Federation) Ferencváros
20	MF	**Roland Sallai**	22 May 1997 (aged 18)	2	1	(Hungarian Football Federation) Puskás Akadémia
21	DF	Dávid Forgács	29 September 1995 (aged 19)	1	0	(Italian Football Federation) Atalanta

== Group F ==
=== Germany ===
The squad was announced on 15 May 2015.

Head coach: (Germany) Frank Wormuth

No.	Pos.	Player	Date of birth (age)	Caps	Goals	Club
1	GK	Marvin Schwäbe	25 April 1995 (aged 20)	3	0	(German Football Association) 1899 Hoffenheim
2	DF	Grischa Prömel	9 January 1995 (aged 20)	2	0	(German Football Association) 1899 Hoffenheim
3	DF	Maximilian Wittek	21 August 1995 (aged 19)	6	0	(German Football Association) 1860 Munich
4	DF	**Kevin Akpoguma**	19 April 1995 (aged 20)	7	0	(German Football Association) 1899 Hoffenheim
5	DF	**Niklas Stark**	14 April 1995 (aged 20)	2	0	(German Football Association) 1. FC Nürnberg
6	MF	**Julian Weigl**	8 September 1995 (aged 19)	7	1	(German Football Association) 1860 Munich
7	FW	Levin Öztunalı	15 March 1996 (aged 19)	6	0	(German Football Association) Werder Bremen
8	MF	Matti Steinmann	1 August 1995 (aged 19)	1	0	(German Football Association) Hamburger SV
9	FW	**Tim Kleindienst**	31 August 1995 (aged 19)	8	0	(German Football Association) Energie Cottbus
10	MF	Marc Stendera	10 December 1995 (aged 19)	3	1	(German Football Association) Eintracht Frankfurt
11	FW	**Julian Brandt**	2 May 1996 (aged 19)	1	0	(German Football Association) Bayer Leverkusen
12	GK	Timon Wellenreuther	3 December 1995 (aged 19)	1	0	(German Football Association) Schalke 04
13	DF	Thomas Hagn	28 February 1995 (aged 20)	6	0	(German Football Association) SpVgg Unterhaching
14	DF	Anthony Syhre	18 March 1995 (aged 20)	1	0	(German Football Association) Hertha BSC
15	DF	Marc-Oliver Kempf	28 January 1995 (aged 20)	2	0	(German Football Association) SC Freiburg
16	MF	Robert Bauer	9 April 1995 (aged 20)	1	0	(German Football Association) FC Ingolstadt
17	DF	**Jeremy Dudziak**	28 August 1995 (aged 19)	1	0	(German Football Association) Borussia Dortmund
18	MF	Hany Mukhtar	21 March 1995 (aged 20)	6	2	(Portuguese Football Federation) Benfica
19	FW	Felix Lohkemper	26 January 1995 (aged 20)	4	0	(German Football Association) VfB Stuttgart
20	FW	Marvin Stefaniak	2 March 1995 (aged 20)	5	0	(German Football Association) Dynamo Dresden
21	GK	Daniel Mesenhöler	24 July 1995 (aged 19)	3	0	(German Football Association) 1. FC Köln

=== Fiji ===
Head coach: (Australia) Frank Farina

No.	Pos.	Player	Date of birth (age)	Caps	Goals	Club
1	GK	Misiwani Nairube	22 February 1996 (aged 19)	11	0	(Fiji Football Association) Ba
2	MF	Praneel Naidu	29 January 1995 (aged 20)	19	1	(Fiji Football Association) Ba
3	MF	Garish Prasad	1 February 1995 (aged 20)	13	0	(Fiji Football Association) Rewa
4	DF	**Jale Dreloa** (c)	21 April 1995 (aged 20)	14	2	(Fiji Football Association) Suva
5	DF	**Antonio Tuivuna**	20 March 1995 (aged 20)	15	4	(Fiji Football Association) Nadi
6	DF	Mohammed Khan	8 November 1995 (aged 19)	8	0	(Fiji Football Association) Nadi
7	MF	**Nickel Chand**	28 July 1995 (aged 19)	11	2	(Fiji Football Association) Suva
8	MF	**Setareki Hughes**	8 June 1995 (aged 19)	14	0	(Fiji Football Association) Rewa
9	FW	**Iosefo Verevou**	5 January 1996 (aged 19)	6	1	(Fiji Football Association) Rewa
10	MF	**Narendra Rao**	27 June 1995 (aged 19)	17	2	(Fiji Football Association) Ba
11	FW	Gabrieile Matanisiga	14 June 1995 (aged 19)	4	0	(Fiji Football Association) Labasa
12	MF	**Tevita Waranaivalu**	16 September 1995 (aged 19)	6	0	(Fiji Football Association) Rewa
13	DF	Mataiasi Toma	14 June 1997 (aged 17)	12	1	(Fiji Football Association) Nadi
14	MF	Ravnit Chand	31 January 1996 (aged 19)	2	0	(Fiji Football Association) Ba
15	FW	**Saula Waqa**	12 October 1995 (aged 19)	10	2	(Fiji Football Association) Ba
16	MF	**Jonetani Buksh**	2 July 1996 (aged 18)	7	0	(Fiji Football Association) Ba
17	DF	**Kolinio Sivoki**	10 March 1995 (aged 20)	17	0	(Fiji Football Association) Suva
18	MF	**Al-Taaf Mansoor**	12 September 1995 (aged 19)	8	1	(Fiji Football Association) Suva
19	FW	Arshnil Raju	27 July 1995 (aged 19)	5	0	(Fiji Football Association) Labasa
20	GK	Divikesh Deo	15 June 1995 (aged 19)	1	0	(New Zealand Football) Auckland United
21	GK	Shaneel Naidu	28 March 1995 (aged 20)	5	0	(Fiji Football Association) Ba

=== Uzbekistan ===
Head coach: (Uzbekistan) Ravshan Khaydarov

No.	Pos.	Player	Date of birth (age)	Caps	Goals	Club
1	GK	Sarvar Karimov	25 December 1996 (aged 18)			(Uzbekistan Football Association) Lokomotiv
2	DF	**Rustam Ashurmatov**	7 July 1996 (aged 18)			(Uzbekistan Football Association) Bunyodkor
3	DF	Ibrokhim Abdullaev	5 December 1996 (aged 18)			(Uzbekistan Football Association) Pakhtakor
4	MF	Mirjamol Kosimov	24 September 1995 (aged 19)			(Uzbekistan Football Association) Bunyodkor
5	DF	**Odiljon Hamrobekov**	13 February 1996 (aged 19)			(Uzbekistan Football Association) Nasaf
6	DF	**Akramjon Komilov**	14 March 1996 (aged 19)			(Uzbekistan Football Association) Bunyodkor
7	MF	Temur Talipov	6 June 1995 (aged 19)			(Uzbekistan Football Association) Pakhtakor
8	MF	**Javokhir Sokhibov** (c)	1 March 1995 (aged 20)			(Uzbekistan Football Association) Pakhtakor
9	FW	**Eldor Shomurodov**	29 June 1995 (aged 19)			(Uzbekistan Football Association) Bunyodkor
10	MF	**Otabek Shukurov**	22 June 1996 (aged 18)			(Uzbekistan Football Association) Bunyodkor
11	MF	**Javokhir Sidikov**	8 December 1996 (aged 18)			(Uzbekistan Football Association) Pakhtakor
12	GK	Dilshod Khamraev	11 July 1995 (aged 19)			(Uzbekistan Football Association) Qizilqum
13	DF	Abbos Otakhonov	25 August 1995 (aged 19)			(Uzbekistan Football Association) Pakhtakor
14	MF	**Khursid Giyosov**	13 April 1995 (aged 20)			(Uzbekistan Football Association) Bunyodkor
15	DF	Najmiddin Normurodov	6 June 1995 (aged 19)			(Uzbekistan Football Association) Nasaf
16	MF	Sardorbek Azimov	1 June 1995 (aged 19)			(Uzbekistan Football Association) Bunyodkor
17	FW	**Dostonbek Khamdamov**	24 July 1996 (aged 18)			(Uzbekistan Football Association) Bunyodkor
18	FW	Ravshan Khursanov	12 August 1996 (aged 18)			(Uzbekistan Football Association) Pakhtakor
19	FW	**Zabikhillo Urinboev**	30 March 1995 (aged 20)			(Uzbekistan Football Association) Bunyodkor
20	DF	**Dostonbek Tursunov**	13 June 1995 (aged 19)			(Uzbekistan Football Association) Neftchi
21	GK	**Botirali Ergashev**	23 June 1995 (aged 19)			(Uzbekistan Football Association) Pakhtakor

=== Honduras ===
Head coach: (Honduras) Jorge Jiménez

No.	Pos.	Player	Date of birth (age)	Caps	Goals	Club
1	GK	Cristian Hernández	22 September 1996 (aged 18)			(National Autonomous Federation of Football of Honduras) Motagua
2	DF	**Kevin Álvarez**	3 August 1996 (aged 18)			(National Autonomous Federation of Football of Honduras) Olimpia
3	DF	Jhonatan Paz	18 June 1995 (aged 19)			(National Autonomous Federation of Football of Honduras) Real Sociedad
4	DF	Luis Santos	5 March 1996 (aged 19)			(National Autonomous Federation of Football of Honduras) Olimpia
5	DF	Dabirson Castillo	25 September 1996 (aged 18)			(National Autonomous Federation of Football of Honduras) Platense
6	DF	Carlos Moncada	9 April 1995 (aged 20)			(National Autonomous Federation of Football of Honduras) Real España
7	FW	**Michaell Chirinos**	17 June 1995 (aged 19)			(National Autonomous Federation of Football of Honduras) Olimpia
8	MF	Elder Torres	14 April 1995 (aged 20)			(National Autonomous Federation of Football of Honduras) Vida
9	FW	**Bryan Róchez**	1 January 1995 (aged 20)			(United States Soccer Federation) Orlando City SC
10	MF	José Escalante	29 May 1995 (aged 20)			(National Autonomous Federation of Football of Honduras) Olimpia
11	MF	**Kevin López**	3 February 1996 (aged 19)			(National Autonomous Federation of Football of Honduras) Motagua
12	GK	Roberto López	23 April 1995 (aged 20)			(National Autonomous Federation of Football of Honduras) Real España
13	MF	**Jhow Benavídez**	26 December 1995 (aged 19)			(National Autonomous Federation of Football of Honduras) Real España
14	MF	John Suazo	7 October 1995 (aged 19)			(National Autonomous Federation of Football of Honduras) Marathón
15	FW	Orental Bodden	24 September 1995 (aged 19)			(National Autonomous Federation of Football of Honduras) Marathón
16	MF	**Devron García**	17 February 1996 (aged 19)			(National Autonomous Federation of Football of Honduras) Victoria
17	FW	**Alberth Elis**	12 February 1996 (aged 19)			(National Autonomous Federation of Football of Honduras) Olimpia
18	DF	**Marcelo Pereira**	27 May 1995 (aged 20)			(National Autonomous Federation of Football of Honduras) Motagua
19	FW	**Júnior Lacayo**	19 August 1995 (aged 19)			(Mexican Football Federation) Santos Laguna
20	MF	**Deiby Flores**	16 June 1996 (aged 18)			(Canadian Soccer Association) Vancouver Whitecaps
21	GK	Rodimiro Tejada	18 April 1996 (aged 19)			(National Autonomous Federation of Football of Honduras) Parrillas One
