= 2015 African U-20 Championship squads =

This article present the squads for the 2015 African U-20 Championship. Only players born on or after 1 January 1995 are eligible to play.

== Congo ==
Head coach: (Italy) Paolo Berrettini

No.	Pos.	Player	Date of birth (age)	Club
1	GK	Darnet Joe Ombandza Mpea	9 April 1998 (aged 16)	(Republic of the Congo) FC Kondzo
2	DF	Karl Ekaya	19 April 1995 (aged 19)	(Republic of the Congo) Diables Noirs
3	DF	Raphaël Leibniz Ebara	4 April 1995 (aged 19)	(Republic of the Congo) CARA Brazzaville
4	MF	Charlevy Mabiala	31 March 1996 (aged 18)	(France) AJ Auxerre
5	MF	Bevic Moussiti-Oko	28 January 1995 (aged 20)	(France) US Lesquin (Note: Player is with US Lesquin, CAF erroneously reported that the player was registered to Lille OSC.)
6	DF	Faria Jobel Ondongo	19 June 1996 (aged 18)	(Republic of the Congo) Étoile du Congo
7	FW	Jean Rosis Okoumou Opimbat	1 January 1997 (aged 18)	(Republic of the Congo) ACNFF
8	MF	Hardy Binguila	17 July 1996 (aged 18)	(France) AJ Auxerre
9	FW	Deldy Muriel Goyi	9 April 1997 (aged 17)	(Republic of the Congo) Diables Noirs
10	MF	Moise Justalain Nkounkou	2 August 1996 (aged 18)	(Republic of the Congo) Étoile du Congo
11	FW	Arci Saint Thibault Biassadila	2 February 1995 (aged 20)	(Republic of the Congo) Diables Noirs
12	FW	Silvère Ganvoula	29 June 1996 (aged 18)	(Morocco) Raja Casablanca
13	MF	Constantin Christ Bakaki	21 September 1996 (aged 18)	(Republic of the Congo) Diables Noirs
14	FW	Kader Bidimbou	20 February 1996 (aged 19)	(Republic of the Congo) AC Léopards
15	DF	Cosme Andrely Atoni	22 December 1996 (aged 18)	(Republic of the Congo) Diables Noirs
16	GK	Pavelh Ndzila	12 January 1995 (aged 20)	(Republic of the Congo) Étoile du Congo
17	MF	Fred Duval Ngoma	24 November 1997 (aged 17)	(Republic of the Congo) Diables Noirs
18	DF	Grace Miguel Itoua	12 April 1995 (aged 19)	(Republic of the Congo) Diables Noirs
19	DF	Dorvel Dibekou	17 November 1998 (aged 16)	(Republic of the Congo) Saint Michel d'Ouenzé
20	MF	Romeni Scott Bitsindou	11 May 1996 (aged 18)	(Belgium) Anderlecht
21	GK	Robelvy Bilongo	11 February 1996 (aged 19)	(Republic of the Congo) Ajax de Ouenze

== Ghana ==
Head coach: (Ghana) Sellas Tetteh

No.	Pos.	Player	Date of birth (age)	Club
1	GK	Michael Sai	24 July 1995 (aged 19)	(Ghana) Berekum Chelsea
2	DF	Yakubu Mohammed	7 June 1996 (aged 18)	(Ghana) Tema Youth
3	MF	Emmanuel Antwi	5 May 1996 (aged 18)	(Ghana) Liberty Professionals
4	DF	Joseph Bempah	5 September 1995 (aged 19)	(Ghana) Hearts of Oak
5	DF	Kingsley Fobi	20 September 1998 (aged 16)	(Ghana) Right to Dream Academy
6	DF	Stephen Anokye Badu	1 May 1996 (aged 18)	(Ghana) Brong Ahafo United
7	FW	Samuel Tetteh	28 July 1996 (aged 18)	(Ghana) West African Football Academy
8	MF	Kofi Yeboah	14 May 1995 (aged 19)	(Ghana) Wa All Stars
9	FW	Samuel Afful	2 December 1995 (aged 19)	(Ghana) Sekondi Hasaacas F.C.
10	MF	Clifford Aboagye	11 February 1995 (aged 20)	(Spain) Granada CF
11	MF	Asiedu Attobrah	15 March 1995 (aged 19)	(Ghana) New Edubiase
12	GK	Kwame Baah	21 April 1998 (aged 16)	(Ghana) Heart of Lions
13	MF	Michel Otou	1 November 1997 (aged 17)	(Ghana) UniStar Academy
14	DF	Joseph Aidoo	29 September 1995 (aged 19)	(Ghana) Inter Allies
15	DF	Joseph Adjei	20 August 1995 (aged 19)	(Ghana) Wa All Stars
16	GK	Mutawakilu Seidu	8 August 1995 (aged 19)	(Ghana) Hearts of Oak
17	MF	Yaw Yeboah	28 March 1997 (aged 17)	(Ghana) Right to Dream Academy (Note: Player is with Right to Dream Academy, CAF erroneously reported that the player was registered to Manchester City.)
18	FW	Jonah Osabutey	8 October 1998 (aged 16)	(Ghana) Tema Youth
19	FW	Benjamin Tetteh	10 July 1997 (aged 17)	(Ghana) Tudu Mighty Jets FC
20	MF	Prosper Kasim	15 December 1996 (aged 18)	(Ghana) Inter Allies
21	DF	Patrick Asmah	25 January 1996 (aged 19)	(Ghana) Brong Ahafo United

== Ivory Coast ==
Head coach: (Ivory Coast) Ibrahim Kamara

No.	Pos.	Player	Date of birth (age)	Club
1	GK	Seck Aboubakar Diabagate	13 August 1996 (aged 18)	(Ivory Coast) AFAD Djékanou
2	DF	Dagou Willie Britto	15 December 1996 (aged 18)	(Ivory Coast) AS Indenié Abengourou
3	DF	Ibrahima Diaby	22 February 1995 (aged 20)	(Ivory Coast) Société Omnisports de l'Armée
4	DF	Ismaël Diallo	29 January 1997 (aged 18)	(France) SC Bastia
5	MF	Victorien Angban	29 September 1996 (aged 18)	(England) Chelsea
6	DF	Mohamed Lamine Doumouya	9 January 1995 (aged 20)	(Norway) Ull/Kisa
7	MF	Junior Landry Ahissan	10 November 1996 (aged 18)	(Ivory Coast) Ivoire Academie
8	FW	Adriel Ba Loua	25 July 1996 (aged 18)	(Ivory Coast) ASEC Mimosas
9	MF	Anderson Niangbo	6 October 1999 (aged 15)	(Ivory Coast) USC Bassam
10	DF	Franck Kessie	19 December 1996 (aged 18)	(Italy) Atalanta Bergamo
11	MF	Yakou Meite	11 February 1996 (aged 19)	(France) Paris SG
12	MF	Brou Manasse Ngoh	10 December 1996 (aged 18)	(Ivory Coast) Société Omnisports de l'Armée
13	MF	Aboubakar Keita	5 November 1997 (aged 17)	(Denmark) FC Copenhagen
14	DF	Sherif Olatunde Jimoh	4 May 1996 (aged 18)	(Ivory Coast) AS Athletic Adjame
15	FW	Chris Bedia	5 March 1996 (aged 19)	(France) FC Tours
16	GK	Koko Yvan Gahie	1 February 1997 (aged 18)	(Ivory Coast) AS Denguele
17	MF	Alexandre Perimael Yehoule	23 December 1995 (aged 19)	(Ivory Coast) Alliance Indenie
18	MF	Kouame Alphonse Yao	17 August 1996 (aged 18)	(Ivory Coast) Royal Atlantic Djibi
19	MF	Habib Maïga	1 January 1996 (aged 19)	(France) AS Saint-Étienne
20	FW	Baba Lamine Traore	16 June 1998 (aged 16)	(Ivory Coast) AFAD Djékanou
21	GK	Adama Ouattara	28 March 1995 (aged 19)	(Ivory Coast) AFAD Djékanou

== Mali ==
Head coach: (Mali) Fagnéry Diarra

No.	Pos.	Player	Date of birth (age)	Club
1	GK	Mahamane Baye	8 October 1996 (aged 18)	(Mali) Avenir Tombouctou
2	DF	Bourama Doumbia	3 October 1997 (aged 17)	(Senegal) ASPIRE
3	MF	Souleymane Diarra	31 January 1995 (aged 20)	(Morocco) Wydad Casablanca
4	DF	Youssouf Koné	5 July 1995 (aged 19)	(France) Lille
5	DF	Ichaka Diarra	18 January 1995 (aged 20)	(Mali) Stade Malien
6	DF	Hamidou Maiga	2 January 1995 (aged 20)	(Mali) LCBA
7	FW	Mohamed Guilavogui	14 November 1996 (aged 18)	(France) Montpellier
8	MF	Diadie Samassékou	11 January 1996 (aged 19)	(Mali) AS Real Bamako
9	FW	Saliou Guindo	12 September 1996 (aged 18)	(Ivory Coast) ASEC Mimosas
10	FW	Hamidou Traoré	7 October 1996 (aged 18)	(Turkey) Elazigspor
11	FW	Malick Touré	22 September 1995 (aged 19)	(Tunisia) Club Africain
12	DF	Souleymane Coulibaly	8 August 1996 (aged 18)	(Mali) AS Real Bamako
13	DF	Aboubacar Doumbia	19 April 1995 (aged 19)	(Mali) AS Real Bamako
14	MF	Alassane Diallo	19 February 1995 (aged 20)	(Belgium) KVC Westerlo
15	FW	Souleymane Sissoko	10 April 1996 (aged 18)	(Mali) Onze Créateurs
16	GK	Mohamed Sanogo	13 August 1995 (aged 19)	(Mali) Onze Créateurs
17	MF	Falaye Sacko	1 May 1995 (aged 19)	(Mali) Djoliba AC
18	MF	Moussa Bagayoko	18 December 1998 (aged 16)	(Mali) Black Stars
19	FW	Adama Traoré	28 June 1995 (aged 19)	(France) Lille
20	MF	Fousseni Diabaté	18 October 1995 (aged 19)	(France) Reims
21	GK	Sory Ibrahim Traoré	24 January 1996 (aged 19)	(Mali) AS Bamako

== Nigeria ==
Head coach: (Nigeria) Manu Garba

No.	Pos.	Player	Date of birth (age)	Club
1	GK	Joshua Enaholo	24 July 1996 (aged 18)	(Nigeria) MFM FC
2	DF	Musa Muhammed	31 October 1996 (aged 18)	(Nigeria) FC Heart Academy
3	DF	Mustapha Abdullahi	18 January 1996 (aged 19)	(Nigeria) Spotlight F.C.
4	MF	Akinjide Elijah Idowu	9 September 1996 (aged 18)	(Nigeria) Nath Boys Academy
5	DF	Abdulganiyu Saheed	23 March 1996 (aged 18)	(Nigeria) Ace Football Academy
6	DF	Prince Izuchukwu Omego	15 August 1996 (aged 18)	(Nigeria) Apapa Golden
7	MF	Bernard Bulbwa	11 October 1996 (aged 18)	(Nigeria) Shuttle Sports Academy
8	FW	Abdullahi Ibrahim Alhassan	3 November 1996 (aged 18)	(Nigeria) FC Heart Academy
9	FW	Christian Pyagbara	13 March 1996 (aged 18)	(Nigeria) Dolphins
10	MF	Abdullahi Alfa	29 July 1996 (aged 18)	(Nigeria) Football College Academy
11	FW	Usman Sale	27 August 1995 (aged 19)	(Nigeria) Wikki Tourists
12	MF	Ifeanyi Ifeanyi	15 August 1995 (aged 19)	(Nigeria) Water FC
13	DF	Samuel Okon	15 December 1996 (aged 18)	(Nigeria) Greater Tomorrow Academy
14	MF	Obinna Nwobodo	29 November 1996 (aged 18)	(Nigeria) Enugu Rangers
15	MF	Ifeanyi Matthew	20 January 1997 (aged 18)	(Nigeria) El-Kanemi Warriors
16	GK	Dele Alampasu	24 December 1996 (aged 18)	(Nigeria) Abuja Football College
17	FW	Chidera Ezeh	2 October 1997 (aged 17)	(Portugal) FC Porto
18	FW	Taiwo Awoniyi	12 August 1997 (aged 17)	(Nigeria) Imperial Soccer Academy
19	DF	Zaharadeen Bello	21 December 1997 (aged 17)	(Nigeria) Dabo Babes Academy
20	FW	Adebiyi Samuel	11 October 1996 (aged 18)	(Rwanda) Sunrise FC
21	GK	Olorunleke Ojo	17 August 1995 (aged 19)	(Nigeria) Giwa FC

== Senegal ==
Head coach: (Senegal) Joseph Koto

No.	Pos.	Player	Date of birth (age)	Club
1	GK	Lamine Ba	4 June 1995 (aged 19)	(Senegal) Dakar SC
2	FW	Alassane Diouf	12 January 1997 (aged 18)	(Senegal) Darou Salam
3	DF	Andelinou Corréa	31 December 1996 (aged 18)	(Senegal) Dakar SC
4	DF	Mouhameth Sané	26 January 1996 (aged 19)	(France) Dijon FCO
5	DF	Racine Coly	8 February 1995 (aged 20)	(Italy) Brescia Calcio
6	DF	Elimane Oumar Cissé	12 March 1995 (aged 19)	(Senegal) Diambars FC
7	FW	Ibrahima Wadji	5 May 1995 (aged 19)	(Senegal) Mbour Petite Côte
8	MF	Sidy Sarr	5 June 1996 (aged 18)	(Senegal) Mbour Petite Côte
9	DF	Pape Abou Cissé	14 September 1995 (aged 19)	(France) AC Ajaccio
10	MF	Soro Mbaye	7 July 1995 (aged 19)	(France) CS Sedan
11	FW	El Hadji Malick Niang	9 December 1995 (aged 19)	(Senegal) US Gorée
12	MF	Mamadou Loum Ndiaye	30 December 1996 (aged 18)	(Senegal) US Ouakam
13	DF	Alhassane Sylla	24 August 1995 (aged 19)	(Senegal) Diambars FC
14	FW	Moussa Koné	30 December 1996 (aged 18)	(Senegal) Dakar SC
15	DF	Moussa Wagué	4 October 1998 (aged 16)	(Senegal) ASPIRE
16	GK	Seydou Sy	12 December 1995 (aged 19)	(France) AS Monaco
17	MF	Roger Gomis	20 March 1995 (aged 19)	(France) CS Louhans-Cuiseaux
18	MF	Alassane Sow	3 January 1997 (aged 18)	(Spain) Real Saragossa
19	FW	Sékou Gassama	6 May 1995 (aged 19)	(Spain) Rayo Vallecano
20	FW	Oumar Goudiaby	1 January 1995 (aged 20)	(Senegal) Guédiawaye FC
21	GK	Ibrahima Sy	13 August 1995 (aged 19)	(France) FC Lorient

== South Africa ==
Head coach: (South Africa) Thabo Senong

No.	Pos.	Player	Date of birth (age)	Club
1	GK	Sibongiseni Mkhize	16 June 1996 (aged 18)	(South Africa) FC Cape Town
2	DF	Kabelo Seriba	12 May 1997 (aged 17)	(South Africa) Bloemfontein Celtic
3	DF	Bongane Mathabela	5 May 1996 (aged 18)	(South Africa) Witbank Spurs
4	DF	Chaz Gerard Williams	20 October 1995 (aged 19)	(South Africa) Cape Town All Stars
5	DF	Ayabulela Magqwaka	12 January 1996 (aged 19)	(South Africa) SuperSport United
6	DF	Tebogo Moerane	7 April 1995 (aged 19)	(South Africa) Bidvest Wits
7	FW	Tyroane Sandows	12 February 1995 (aged 20)	(Brazil) Gremio
8	MF	Tlotlo Leepile	2 August 1996 (aged 18)	(Portugal) G.D. Tourizense
9	FW	Dumisani Zuma	22 May 1995 (aged 19)	(South Africa) Bloemfontein Celtic
10	FW	Siyanda Ngubo	4 December 1996 (aged 18)	(South Africa) Orlando Pirates
11	MF	Pule Maraisane	3 January 1995 (aged 20)	(Portugal) G.D. Tourizense
12	DF	Maphosa Modiba	22 July 1995 (aged 19)	(South Africa) Mpumalanga Black Aces
13	DF	Motjeka Madisha	12 January 1995 (aged 20)	(South Africa) Mamelodi Sundowns
14	FW	Tshidiso Monamodi	21 February 1997 (aged 18)	(South Africa) Bidvest Wits
15	MF	Keamogetswe Boikanyo	25 October 1996 (aged 18)	(South Africa) Mamelodi Sundowns
16	GK	Dumsani Msibi	1 May 1995 (aged 19)	(South Africa) SuperSport United
17	FW	Thamsanqa Masiya	17 September 1996 (aged 18)	(South Africa) Bidvest Wits
18	MF	Siphelele Luthuli	1 February 1995 (aged 20)	(South Africa) University of Pretoria F.C.
19	MF	Haashim Domingo	13 August 1995 (aged 19)	(Portugal) Vitória de Guimarães
20	MF	Morne Nel	23 May 1996 (aged 18)	(South Africa) SuperSport United
21	GK	Mpho Mathekga	13 June 1996 (aged 18)	(South Africa) Mamelodi Sundowns

== Zambia ==
Head coach: (Zambia) Hector Chilombo

No.	Pos.	Player	Date of birth (age)	Club
1	GK	Mangani Banda	13 July 1997 (aged 17)	(Zambia) Zanaco F.C.
2	DF	Benedict Chepeshi	10 June 1996 (aged 18)	(Zambia) Red Arrows F.C.
3	DF	Peter Mulenga	11 February 1995 (aged 20)	(Zambia) Red Arrows F.C.
4	DF	Boyd Mkandawire	11 April 1997 (aged 17)	(Zambia) NAPSA Stars
5	DF	Simon Tembo	18 May 1996 (aged 18)	(Zambia) Kabwe Warriors
6	DF	Mweene Mumbi	31 August 1995 (aged 19)	(South Africa) African Soccer Cape Town
7	FW	Patrick Ngoma	21 May 1997 (aged 17)	(Zambia) Red Arrows F.C.
8	FW	Patson Daka	9 October 1998 (aged 16)	(Zambia) Nchanga Rangers
9	MF	Charles Zulu	2 January 1996 (aged 19)	(Zambia) Zanaco F.C.
10	MF	Langson Mbewe	21 January 1996 (aged 19)	(Zambia) Kabwe Warriors
11	MF	Larry Bwalya	29 May 1995 (aged 19)	(Zambia) Power Dynamos
12	MF	Benson Sakala	12 September 1996 (aged 18)	(United States) Chicago Magic PSG
13	DF	Kayawe Kapota	27 December 1996 (aged 18)	(Zambia) Mpande Youth
14	FW	Harrison Chisala	4 August 1997 (aged 17)	(Zambia) Nkana F.C.
15	DF	Alex Mwamba	28 May 1995 (aged 19)	(Zambia) Power Dynamos
16	GK	Geofrey Silavwe	28 May 1996 (aged 18)	(Zambia) Green Buffaloes
17	MF	Lubambo Musonda	1 March 1995 (aged 20)	(Armenia) Ulisses FC
18	MF	Spencer Sautu	10 March 1996 (aged 18)	(Zambia) Green Eagles
19	MF	Kelvin Chinyama	28 February 1996 (aged 19)	(Zambia) Nkana F.C.
20	FW	Dave Daka	3 December 1996 (aged 18)	(Zambia) Zanaco F.C.
21	GK	Tresford Mulenga	21 August 1998 (aged 16)	(Zambia) Kabwe Warriors
