= Joseph Bempah =

Ghanaian footballer

Personal information
- Full name: Joseph Owusu Bempah
- Date of birth: 5 September 1995 (age 31)
- Place of birth: Offinso, Ghana
- Height: 1.69 m (5 ft 6 1/2 in)
- Position: Midfielder

Youth career
- King Faisal
- Real Tamale
- New Edubiase
- Hearts of Oak

Senior career*
Years	Team	Apps	(Gls)
2012–2016	Hearts of Oak	57	(1)
2017	Bechem United	0	(0)
2017	Vojvodina	9	(3)
2018	Murciélagos	5	(0)
2018	Sloboda Užice	14	(0)
2019	Proleter Novi Sad	10	(0)
2019–2020	Radnički Pirot	7	(0)
2020–2021	Borac Čačak	28	(0)
2021–2022	Ashanti Gold	1	(0)

International career
2015	Ghana U20	5	(0)
Medal record
Bronze medal – third place	African U-20 Championship	2015
- * Club domestic league appearances and goals as of 23 August 2020

Joseph "Joja" Owusu Bempah (born 5 September 1995) is a Ghanaian professional footballer who plays as a midfielder.

== Club career ==
=== Ghanaian Premier League ===
Born in Offinso, Ashanti Region, Ghana, Bempah played with several clubs in his early years, including King Faisal Babes, Real Tamale United and New Edubiase United. He joined Accra Hearts of Oak in 2012 and since the beginning of 2013 he became the first squad player. During the time he played with the club he was also awarded with a captain's armband. At the beginning of 2017, after the end of contract with his former club Hearts of Oak, he permanently moved to Bechem United as a free agent, but shortly after he terminated the deal.

=== Move to Europe: Vojvodina ===
Bempah moved to the Serbian SuperLiga side Vojvodina at the beginning of 2017, but due to administrative problems, he officially joined the club in May same year. He made his debut in 35 fixture of the 2016–17 season, replacing Siniša Babić in 84 minute of the match against Radnički Niš. On 7 June 2017, Bempah signed a three-year contract with the club. He scored his first goal for Vojvodina in opening match of the 2017–18 Serbian SuperLiga season for 1–0 win over Čukarički on 21 July 2017. Bempah also scored in the first match he started on the field, against Radnik Surdulica next week. On 9 August 2017, Bempah scored in 2–0 away win against Borac Čačak, helping Vojvodina to make 4th successive win and collect all 12 points at the beginning of the domestic competition in Serbia. At early December 2017, Bempah and Vojvodina mutually terminated the contract.

== International career ==
Bempah captained Ghana national under-20 football team at the 2015 African U-20 Championship, where he won bronze medal, beating Mali for the third place on the tournament. Bempah was also a squad member at the 2015 FIFA U-20 World Cup, where he capped on match against Austria in a group stage.

== Style of play ==
In early years of his career, Bempah has started playing football as a defender, mostly operating as a right side full-back being capable of playing left too. Beside the defensive skills, he has a great explosive power. Moving to the European football, Bempah has been mostly used as a defensive or central midfielder. Having a back-up role for a few months in his first matches with Vojvodina, he affirmed himself as a utility player. Bempah also capped as a second striker a couple of times before he became the regular member of Vojvodina's first squad as a right winger. As one of the most successful goal poachers, Bempah scored in 3 of 4 games at the beginning 2017–18 Serbian SuperLiga season.

== Career statistics ==
=== Club ===
As of 22 May 2018

Appearances and goals by club, season and competition
Club	Season	League			Cup		Continental		Other		Total	
Club	Season	Division	Apps	Goals	Apps	Goals	Apps	Goals	Apps	Goals	Apps	Goals
Hearts of Oak	2012–13	Premier League	15	0	—		—		—		15	0
Hearts of Oak	2013–14	Premier League	15	0	—		—		—		15	0
Hearts of Oak	2015	Premier League	15	0	—		—		—		15	0
Hearts of Oak	2016	Premier League	12	1	—		—		—		12	1
Hearts of Oak	Total		57	1	—		—		—		57	1
Vojvodina	2016–17	SuperLiga	1	0	—		—		—		1	0
Vojvodina	2017–18	SuperLiga	8	3	1	0	0	0	—		9	3
Vojvodina	Total		9	3	1	0	0	0	—		10	3
Murciélagos	2017–18	Ascenso MX	5	0	3	0	0	0	—		8	0
Murciélagos	Total		5	0	3	0	0	0	—		8	0
Career total			71	4	4	0	0	0	—		75	4

== Honours ==
Ghana U20

- African U-20 Championship bronze medal: 2015
