= Michel Otou =

Ghanaian footballer (born 1997)

Personal information
- Full name: Michel Otou
- Date of birth: 1 November 1997 (age 29)
- Place of birth: Accra, Ghana
- Height: 1.75 m (5 ft 9 in)
- Position: Midfielder

Team information
- Current team: Legon Cities
- Number: 33

Senior career*
| Years | Team | Apps | (Gls) |
| 2018–2020 | International Allies | 28 | (1) |
| 2020–2021 | Accra Great Olympics | 26 | (0) |
| 2021– | Legon Cities | 60 | (11) |

International career
| 2015 | Ghana U20 | 3 | (0) |
- * Club domestic league appearances and goals

Michel Otou (born 1 November 1997) is a Ghanaian professional footballer who plays as a midfielder for Ghanaian Premier League side Accra Great Olympics. He previously played for and served as captain of International Allies.

== Club career ==
=== Early career ===
Otou started his career with Ghana Division One League side Unistar Academy before later moving to International Allies in 2017. In 2016 he went on a short-term loan to Portimonense SC. In July 2017, he also went for a three weeks trials at Scottish Premiership side Heart of Midlothian, but couldn't secure a deal. During the 2017 Ghana Division One League season, he scored 3 goals and made 5 assists in 13 league matches before moving on Scotland for the trails with Hearts.

=== International Allies ===
In December 2017, Otou was signed by Ghana Premier League side International Allies from Unistar Academy for an undisclosed fee. During the 2018 Ghanaian Premier League, he played in a 14 league matches and scored 1 goal before the league was abandoned due to the dissolution of the GFA in June 2018, as a result of the Anas Number 12 Expose. He made his debut on 16 March 2018 in the first match of the season, playing the full 90 minutes in a match against Bechem United as Victorien Adebayor scored a brace to secure a 3–0 win. He scored his first goal for the club on 23 May 2018, converting a penalty to score the lone goal and help Inter Allies secure a 1–0 victory over Wa All Stars. In April 2019, he was named as captain of the side. He captained them during the 2019 GFA Committee Special Competition and was one of the club's stand out performers. He played in 13 out of 14 of the matches and scored 2 goals. On 11 April 2019, he converted a penalty in the 44th minute in a 2–1 win over Dreams FC. He also scored a goal in a 4–2 win over West Africa Football Academy (WAFA) on 19 May 2019. He featured in 4 matches in the 2019–20 Ghana Premier League season before the league was put on hold and later cancelled due to the COVID-19 pandemic. He parted ways with the club after he had few months remaining on his contract.

=== Great Olympics ===
Ahead of the 2020–21 Ghana Premier League, he signed for Accra Great Olympics along with his former Inter Allies colleague, Saed Salifu. On 10 January 2021, he made an assist to Gladson Awako to score a goal in the 14th minute of a match against Ashanti Gold, even though the match ended in a 2–1 loss, he was ajudged as the man of the match.

== International career ==
=== Youth team ===
Otou was a member of the Ghana national under-20 football team from 2015 to 2017. He was a member of the squad that placed third at the 2015 African U-20 Championship. He featured in 2 matches during the tournament.
