= Jonathan Quartey (footballer, born 1988) =

Ghanaian footballer

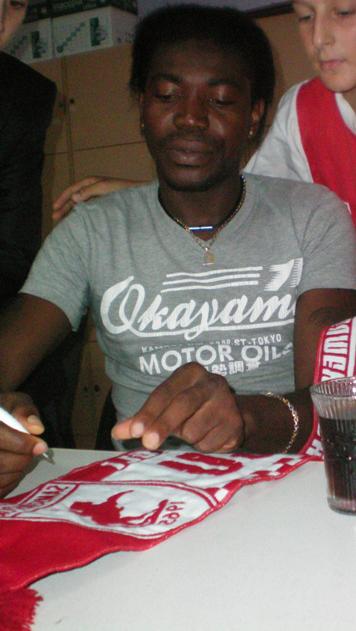

Personal information
- Date of birth: 2 June 1988 (age 38)
- Place of birth: Accra, Ghana
- Height: 1.86 m (6 ft 1 in)
- Position: Defender

Team information
- Current team: New Radiant SC
- Number: 17

Youth career
- Liberty Professionals F.C.

Senior career*
Years	Team	Apps	(Gls)
2005	Heart of Lions		
2006	International Allies		
2006	Ashanti Gold SC		
2007	Heart of Lions		
2008–2009	Kaizer Chiefs	22	(2)
2009–2011	OGC Nice	0	(0)
2010–2011	→ Samsunspor (loan)	1	(0)
2011	Power FC		
2012	Hanoi ACB		
2012–2013	Ashanti Gold SC		
2014–	New Radiant SC	0	(0)

International career
2005	Ghana U-17	3	(1)
2008–2010	Ghana	9	(0)
- * Club domestic league appearances and goals

Jonathan Quartey (born 2 June 1988 in Accra) is a Ghanaian footballer who plays for New Radiant Sports Club.

He played for various clubs in South Africa, France, Turkey, Vietnam and the Maldives.

He represented Ghana at the 2005 FIFA U-17 World Championship in Peru. His debut for the senior team was against Libya on 5 September 2008.

== Honours ==
- 2007–08: Telkom Knockout winner
- 2008–09: MTN8 winner
