= Samuel Ayew Yeboah =

Ghanaian professional soccer player (born 1988)

Sam Ayew
Personal information
- Full name: Samuel Ayew Yeboah
- Date of birth: April 10, 1988 (age 38)
- Place of birth: Tamale, Ghana
- Height: 1.75 m (5 ft 9 in)
- Position: Attacking midfielder

Senior career*
Years	Team	Apps	(Gls)
2004–2007	Inter Allies		
2005–2006	→ Liberty Professionals (loan)		
2007–2009	Liberty Professionals		
2009–2010	Eleven Wise		
2010–2011	Liberty Professionals		
2011–2012	Tvøroyrar Bóltfelag		
2012–	Tema Youth		

International career^{‡}
2008	Ghana	1	(0)
- * Club domestic league appearances and goals as of 27 June 2013 ‡ National team caps and goals as of 30 May 2009

Samuel Ayew Yeboah (born 10 April 1988) is a Ghanaian professional soccer player.

== Career ==
=== Inter Allies and Liberty Professionals ===
After a successful season with Inter Allies in 2006/2007, Yeboah was loaned to Liberty Professionals in September 2005, with a purchase option.

=== Liberty Professionals ===
In December 2007, Liberty Professionals bought his contract.

=== Sekondi Wise Fighters ===
In the summer of 2009, Ayew Yeboah was sold by Liberty Professionals to Sekondi Wise Fighters, where he played for the 2009–2010 season. Sekondi Wise Fighters finished in sixteenth place at the end of the 2009–2010 Glo Premier League season. In September 2010, Ayew Yeboah left Sekondi Wise Fighters to sign with his former club Liberty Professionals.

=== Return to Liberty Professionals ===
Due to Ayew Yeboah's performance, Liberty Professionals signed him in September 2010.

=== Move to Europe ===
In 2011 he left Ghana and went on trial to Danish club Thisted FC. On 29 November 2011 he signed with Tvøroyrar Bóltfelag from Faroe Islands.

=== Return to Ghana ===
After one year with the newly promoted Faroe Faroe Islands Tvøroyrar Bóltfelag club, Yeboah returned to Ghana and signed for Tema Youth. Yeboah had stints in the United States of America in 2013 with a club called La Missioneros fc. Samuel returned to Ghana in 2014 to play for Inter Allies until 2016.

== International career ==
Ayew Yeboah was called up for the Ghana national football team (Black Stars) on 20 August 2008 for a friendly game against Tanzania national football team. Ayew Yeboah was also member of the Ghana squad that played in the 2009 African Nations Championship that was held in Côte d'Ivoire.
