= Fred Duval Ngoma =

Republic of the Congo footballer

Fred Ngoma
Personal information
- Full name: Fred Duval Ngoma
- Date of birth: 24 November 1997 (age 28)
- Place of birth: Pointe-Noire, Republic of the Congo
- Height: 1.73 m (5 ft 8 in)
- Position: Midfielder

Team information
- Current team: CA Bizertin

Senior career*
Years	Team	Apps	(Gls)
2015–2016	CSMD Diables Noirs		
2017	AC Léopards		
2018	CS La Mancha		
2018–2021	AS Otôho		
2021–	CA Bizertin		

International career^{‡}
2018	Congo	1	(0)
- * Club domestic league appearances and goals ‡ National team caps and goals as of 7 September 2021

Fred Duval Ngoma (born 24 November 1997) is a Republic of the Congo football midfielder for CA Bizertin.
