= International Allies F.C. =

Association football club in Tema

Inter Allies
- International Allies Football Club
- Nickname: Eleven is to One
- Founded: October 1996; 30 years ago
- Ground: El Wak Stadium; Accra, Greater Accra, Ghana (only in the Ghana Premier League)
- Capacity: 7,000
- Chairman: Omar Nasser El-Eter
- Manager: Henrik Lehm
- League: Ghana Premier League
- Website: www.interalliesfc.com

International Allies FC is a Ghanaian professional football club based in Tema, Greater Accra. They play in the Ghana Premier League.

== History ==
The club was founded in October 1996 by Omar Nasser El-Eter, Rabeh Nasser El-Eter and the late Robert Tetteh, a former player for SS74 team of the seventies, Accra Great Olympics and Ghana Black Stars.

In 1997, Inter Allies discovered International Allies FC's first player, Michael Coffie who played in the FIFA U-17 World Cup with the Ghana National team, The Black Starlets.

He started the club in the third division league and by the year 2000, the club qualified to play in the second division league.

The club won the second division league title on three occasions. In 2001, three players were transferred into the Ghana Premier League and for the second time, it had a player play in 2001 FIFA U-20 World Cup in Argentina with the Black Satellites Squad.

In 2005, the club had three players for 2005 CAF U-17 African Cup of Nations in Gambia namely Jonathan Quartey, Emmanuel Banahene and Solomon Addy that won Ghana the silver medal which qualified Black Starlets for the 2005 FIFA U-17 World Cup in Peru. The above named players are currently still playing for the Ghana national football team.

In 2007, Inter had another three players for the Black Starlets squad that played in the 2007 CAF U-17 Tournament in Togo namely David Addy, Moses Otiboe and Nathaniel Asamoah.

In the 2007/2008 Ghana Premier League season, Inter had seven players currently playing namely Emmanuel Banahene (Kpando Heart of Lions), Samuel Ayew Yeboah and Isaac Amponsah (Liberty Professionals FC), Nathaniel Asamoah, David Addy and Daniel Coffie (Wa All Stars F.C.) and Simon Martey (Asante Kotoko).

After several years, they had some of their players, David Addy and Emmanuel Banahene in the Senior national team the Black Stars.

The club in 2008 had a player (Dominic Oduro) playing for FC Dallas in the United States. He was scouted while playing for the University of Ghana, Legon by the Virginia Commonwealth University. Inter also have one player, Jonathan Quartey playing for Kaizer Chiefs FC in the South African Premier League.

In January, 2008, the team took part in the 60th Edition of the Torneo Mondiale Di Calcio "Coppa Carnevale" from 28 January to 11 February. In the 2012/2013 season, six players left the club and joined other teams worldwide. Laud Ofosuhene joined to Portuguese Rio Ave F.C., Clifford Aboagye signed with Serie A top club Udinese Calcio, Aminu Abdallah joined to Canadian-based Major League Soccer club Vancouver Whitecaps FC and Fatau Mohammed signed with Swedish lower lige side Vimmerby IF. In June 2013, Inter defeated Danbort FC and qualified first time for the promotion to the Ghana Premier League. The club hosted its home games in the 2013/2014 Ghana Premier League season at the Tema Sports Stadium, because the original home stadium Ho Sports Stadium was too small.

In January 2017, it was announced by the club that home games in the 2016/2017 Ghana Premier League would be played at the El Wak Stadium in Accra. In April 2019, Michel Otou was the club captain, he left the club in 2020 few months before his contract expired.

== Match Fixing Scandal ==
In July 2021 Inter Allies defender Hashmin Musah has confessed to scoring two intentional own goals in Saturday's Ghana Premier League clash with Ashanti Gold in order to defy an attempt at match-fixing from his own team. The club lost 7–0, with Musah coming off the bench to net twice past his own keeper in the final 12 minutes. He claims that he did so on purpose as he believes that the score had been agreed in advance for betting purposes.

== Honours ==
=== National ===
- Ghanaian FA Cup
  - Runners-up (1): 2013–14

== Staff ==
=== Management ===
Chairman

- (Ghana) Omar Nasser El-Eter

Vice chairman

- (Ghana) Rabeh EL-Eter

Chief executive officer

- (Ghana) Delali Eric Senaye

Technical director

- (Ghana) William Klutse

=== Sports ===
Manager
(Denmark) Henrik Lehm
Head coach

- (Ghana) Herber Addo

== Current squad ==
As of 7 July 2017

Note: Flags indicate national team as defined under FIFA eligibility rules; some limited exceptions apply. Players may hold more than one non-FIFA nationality.

No.	Pos.	Nation	Player
1	GK	GHA	Kwame Osei
2	FW	GHA	Samuel Mensah Koné
5	MF	SEN	Hashmin Musah
6	MF	GHA	Samuel Bekoe
8	MF	GHA	Isaac Twum
9	FW	GHA	Isaac Osea
11	FW	NIG	Victorien Adebayor
12	GK	GHA	Kwame Baah
13	FW	GHA	Ismael Ntefuni
15	MF	GHA	Prince Baffoe (Captain)

No.	Pos.	Nation	Player
19	FW	GHA	Frederick Boateng
21	DF	GHA	Paul Abanga
22	GK	GHA	Kotei Blankson
23	MF	GHA	Antwi Kwame Amoako
24	MF	GHA	Martin Antwi
25	DF	GHA	Uriah Kporvi
26	MF	GHA	Desmond Abuga
29	DF	GHA	Issahaku Zakari
36	GK	GHA	Saed Salifu
43	MF	GHA	Abdul Halik Hudu

== Notable players ==
These players have famous played during his active career with the club.

- Victorien Adebayor
- Michel Otou

=== Member of the Black Stars ===
- David Addy
- Daniel Amartey
- Emmanuel Banahene
- Jonathan Quartey
- Samuel Yeboah
- Joseph Aidoo

=== Youth national team players ===
- Francis Sogbé, played the 2005 FIFA U-17 World Championship
- Kwame Baah (footballer), played the 2015 African U-20 Championship
- Kwame Baah (footballer), played the 2015 FIFA U-20 World Cup

=== Other national team players ===
- Ben Teekloh, 23 games for the Liberia national football team

== Top scorers ==
- Sheriff Deo Mohammed (9 goals) 2015 season
- Frederick Boateng (9 goals) 2016 season
- Victorien Adebayor (12 goals) 2019–20 season

== Reserve ==
The club has a Farm team which plays its games in the Division Two League Greater Accra Regional Football Association Middle League, as part of the Accra Youth Soccer Academy Organisation.
