= Papa Faye =

Senegalese footballer

Personal information
- Full name: Papa Diene Faye
- Date of birth: 30 November 1996 (age 29)
- Place of birth: Senegal
- Height: 1.68 m (5 ft 6 in)
- Position: Winger

Team information
- Current team: São Bento (on loan from Ponte Preta)

Senior career*
Years	Team	Apps	(Gls)
2015–2016	Mbour Petite-Côte FC	0	(0)
2017–2020	AS Salé	0	(0)
2020–	Ponte Preta	7	(0)
2021–	→ São Bento (loan)	0	(0)
- * Club domestic league appearances and goals

Papa Diene Faye (born 30 November 1996) is a Senegalese footballer who plays as a winger for São Bento, on loan from Ponte Preta.

== Career ==
Faye started his career with Mbour Petite-Côte in Senegal, before joining Moroccan side AS Salé. After leaving AS Salé due to delayed payments, he trained at the Moroccan academy Ginga Foot Casablanca, which was coached by a Brazilian, who eventually helped him join Associação Atlética Ponte Preta in the Brazilian second division.
