= Michel Tabárez =

Uruguayan footballer (born 1995)

Personal information
- Full name: Michel Emanuel Tabárez Soria
- Date of birth: 29 March 1995 (age 31)
- Place of birth: Treinta y Tres, Uruguay
- Height: 1.91 m (6 ft 3 in)
- Position: Goalkeeper

Senior career*
Years	Team	Apps	(Gls)
2014–2017	CA Fénix	9	(0)

International career
2014–2015	Uruguay U20	4	(0)
- * Club domestic league appearances and goals as of 11:19, 28 May 2020 (UTC)

Michel Emanuel Tabárez Soria (born 29 March 1995) is an Uruguayan footballer who last played for CA Fénix.

== Career statistics ==
=== Club ===
As of 28 May 2020.

Club	Season	League			Cup		Continental		Other		Total	
Club	Season	Division	Apps	Goals	Apps	Goals	Apps	Goals	Apps	Goals	Apps	Goals
CA Fénix	2013–14	Primera División	0	0	0	0	–		0	0	0	0
CA Fénix	2014–15	Primera División	9	0	0	0	–		0	0	9	0
CA Fénix	2015–16	Primera División	0	0	0	0	–		0	0	0	0
CA Fénix	2016	Primera División	0	0	0	0	0	0	0	0	0	0
CA Fénix	2017	Primera División	0	0	0	0	–		0	0	0	0
Career total			9	0	0	0	0	0	0	0	9	0
