= Stefan Mitmasser =

Austrian footballer

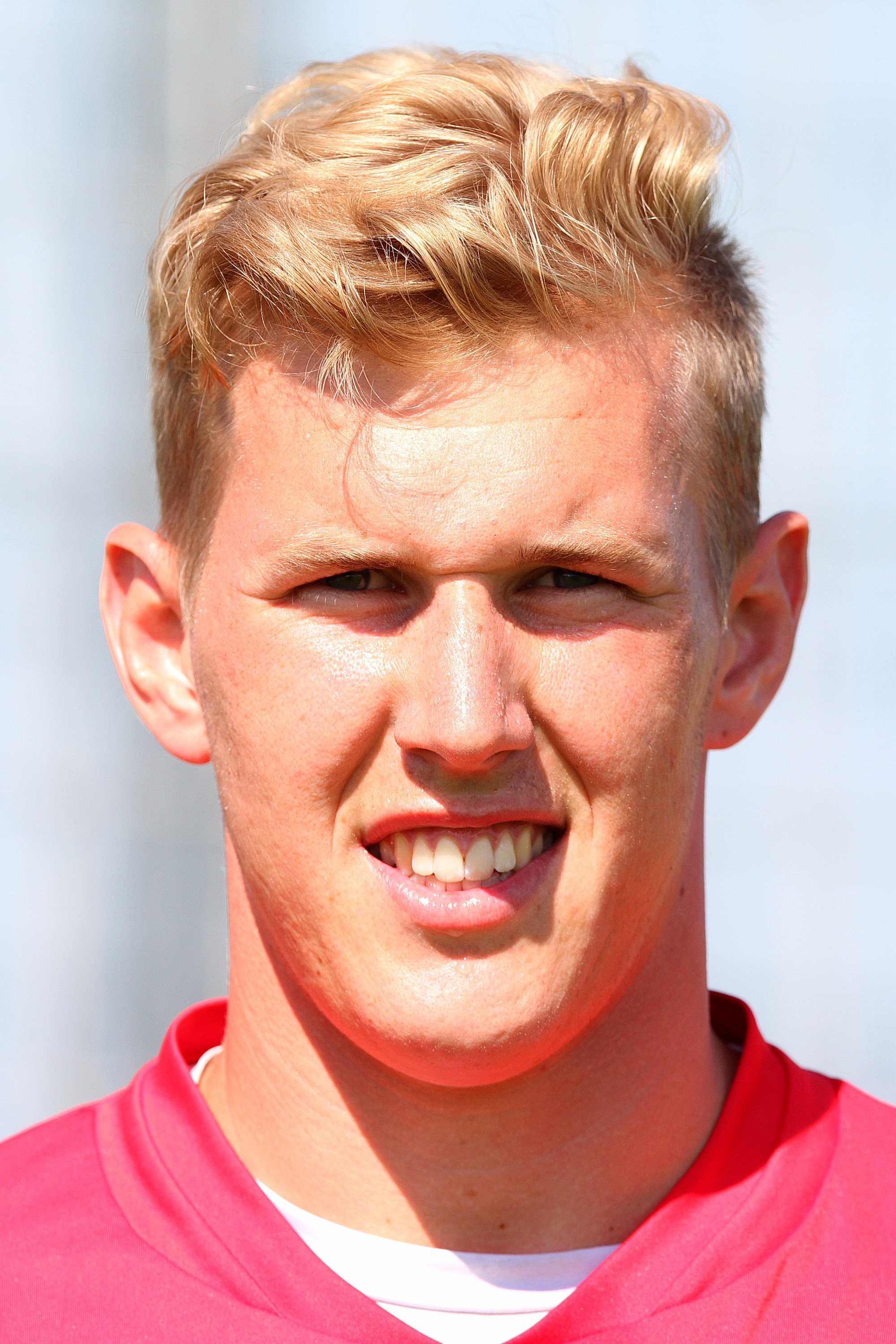
- Stefan Mitmasser in 2016

Personal information
- Date of birth: 13 May 1995 (age 31)
- Place of birth: Austria
- Height: 1.93 m (6 ft 4 in)
- Position: Goalkeeper

Youth career
- –2013: SKN St. Pölten

Senior career*
Years	Team	Apps	(Gls)
2013–2016	SV Horn	16	(0)
- * Club domestic league appearances and goals as of 20 June 2016

Stefan Mitmasser (born 13 May 1995) is an Austrian footballer.
