= Kwame Baah (footballer) =

Ghanaian footballer

Personal information
- Full name: Kwame Baah
- Date of birth: April 21, 1998 (age 28)
- Place of birth: Accra, Ghana
- Position: Goalkeeper

Team information
- Current team: Asante Kotoko

Youth career
- 2014: Heart of Lions

Senior career*
Years	Team	Apps	(Gls)
2015	Heart of Lions		
2016	→ Inter Allies (loan)	10	(0)
2017–2019	Inter Allies		
2019–	Asante Kotoko		

International career
2015–2016	Ghana U20	5	(0)
- * Club domestic league appearances and goals as of 8 July 2017

Kwame Baah (born 21 April 1998, in Accra) is a Ghanaian footballer who plays as a goalkeeper for Asante Kotoko in the Ghanaian Premier League.

== Career ==
Kwame Baah made his debut in Ghanaian professional football during the 2015 season with Heart of Lions F.C. in the Ghanaian Division One. He was picked up by Inter Allies FC from Heart of Lions by the end of the 2015 season, having signed a three-year deal with the Premier League side. Baah made his debut for his new club in his first season (2016), during which he appeared in ten matches. He was named vice-captain of the team ahead of their 2017 season and sealed his place as their main goalkeeper.

In the summer 2019, Baah joined Asante Kotoko.

== International career ==
Baah featured for Ghana U20 at the 2015 U20 African Cup of Nations, playing an important role in the match for the 3rd/4th place by stopping a penalty. Baah subsequently also received a call up for the 2015 FIFA U-20 World Cup, assuming the role of reserve goalkeeper for Ghana U20. Kwame featured in all four qualifier games played by Ghana U20 in the qualifiers for 2017 U20 African Cup of Nations.

Baah is part of the Ghana B-team, composed of local players, holding training camps ahead the 2017 WAFU Nations Cup and doubleheader in the 2018 African Nations Championship qualifiers.

== Statistics ==
Season	Club	Country	League	Apps	Goals
2015	Heart of Lions F.C.	Ghana	Ghanaian Division One	?	?
2016	Inter Allies FC	Ghana	Ghanaian Premier League	10	0
2017	Inter Allies FC	Ghana	Ghanaian Premier League	15	0
Total				25	0

Last update: July 8, 2017

== See also ==
- Football in Ghana
