= Stade Caroline Faye =

Sports venue in M'Bour, Senegal

- Stade Caroline Faye
- Location: Mbour, Senegal
- Coordinates: 14.427°N 16.97°W
- Capacity: 5,000
- Surface: Artificial turf

Tenants
- Stade de Mbour; Mbour Petite-Côte FC

Stade Caroline Faye is a multi-use stadium in M'Bour, Senegal. It is currently used mostly for football matches and serves as a home ground of Stade de Mbour and Mbour Petite-Côte FC. The stadium holds 5,000 people.
