= Mutawakilu Seidu =

Ghanaian footballer

Personal information
- Date of birth: August 8, 1995 (age 31)
- Place of birth: Accra, Ghana
- Height: 1.90 m (6 ft 3 in)
- Position: Goalkeeper

Team information
- Current team: Enugu Rangers
- Number: 1

Youth career
- 2012-2014: Asante Kotoko

Senior career*
Years	Team	Apps	(Gls)
2014–2015	Accra Hearts of Oak	27	(0)
2015-2016	→ Dreams F.C. (loan)	12	(0)
2016-2017	Accra Hearts of Oak	9	(0)
2017-	Enugu Rangers	36	(0)

International career
2015	Ghana U-20	8	(0)
- * Club domestic league appearances and goals

Mutawakilu Seidu (born 8 August 1995 in Accra) is a Ghanaian professional footballer. He currently plays for Nigeria Professional Football League side Enugu Rangers, as a goalkeeper.

== Career ==
=== Youth ===
Seidu began his career at Asante Kotoko junior team before being promoted to the senior team.

=== Hearts of Oak ===
In 2014 Seidu signed for Ghana Premier League club Accra Hearts of Oak in his hometown Accra.

=== Dreams FC (loan) ===
In 2015, it was announced that Mutawakilu would be joining Dreams F.C. on a season-long loan, with an option to make the transfer permanent.

=== Enugu Rangers ===
In April 2017, Seidu joined seven-time Nigeria Premier League Champions Enugu Rangers on a two-year deal.

== International ==
On 6 January 2015, Seidu was called up to the Ghana U-20, and was part of the Ghana U-20 team at the 2015 African U-20 Championship in Senegal.

He represented the Ghana U-20 at the FIFA U20 World Cup in New Zealand in 2015.

== Honour ==
=== Club ===
- Enugu Rangers
- Nigerian FA Cup (1): Winner 2018
