= Ibrahima Diaby =

French footballer (born 2007)

Personal information
- Full name: Ibrahima Makaya Diaby
- Date of birth: 17 March 2007 (age 19)
- Place of birth: Conakry, Guinea
- Height: 1.89 m (6 ft 2 in)
- Position: Defensive midfielder

Team information
- Current team: Al-Ahli
- Number: 4

Youth career
- 2019–2025: Paris Saint-Germain

Senior career*
Years	Team	Apps	(Gls)
2025–2026	Cercle Brugge	30	(2)
2026–	Al-Ahli	3	(0)

International career^{‡}
2021–	France U16	1	(0)
2022–	France U17	11	(1)
- * Club domestic league appearances and goals as of 14 September 2026 ‡ National team caps and goals as of 30 October 2026

Ibrahima Diaby (born 17 March 2007) is a French professional footballer who plays as a defensive midfielder for Al-Ahli.

== Club career ==
Born in Conakry, Guinea, Ibrahima Diaby grew up in France, a country from which he obtained the citizenship in 2025.

He is a full product of the Paris Saint-Germain Academy, that he joined aged only 12.

Diaby was a standout with PSG's under-19, captaining the side that won the league in 2024 and 2025 and played the UEFA Youth League, he was offered a first professional contract with the club, but choose to sign for Belgian Pro League outfit Cercle Brugge in July 2025.

Diaby made his professional debut with the Cercle in a 0–0 Belgian league draw with Dender on 26 July 2025.

By the end of the season, and after Lars Friis became the head coach, Diaby had become a central figure with the club that survived the relegation playoffs.

In the summer 2026, he was transferred to Saudi Pro League giants Al-Ahli, for a fee of 12 million euros plus 1.5 of eventual bonuses. This made Diaby the second most expensive sell ever from Cercle Brugge, after Kévin Denkey.

== Style of play ==
An ambidextrous defensive midfielder also able to play as a centre-back, he is described as a strong and technical player.
