= Fallou Niang =

Senegalese footballer

Personal information
- Full name: Serigne Fallou Niang
- Date of birth: 1 May 1995 (age 31)
- Place of birth: Senegal
- Height: 1.72 m (5 ft 8 in)
- Position: Midfielder

Team information
- Current team: Bourgoin-Jallieu
- Number: 27

Youth career
- 2012–2013: Aspire Academy
- 2013–2014: Eupen

Senior career*
Years	Team	Apps	(Gls)
2014–2017	Sfax	39	(0)
2017–2020	Châteauroux B	9	(2)
2017–2020	Châteauroux	13	(0)
2019–2020	→ Le Puy (loan)	14	(1)
2021–2022	Hyères	11	(1)
2022–	Bourgoin-Jallieu	18	(1)

International career
2011	Senegal U17	3	(0)
2015	Senegal U20	2	(0)
- * Club domestic league appearances and goals as of 19:04, 30 July 2023 (UTC)

Serigne Fallou Niang (born 1 May 1995) is a Senegalese professional footballer who plays as a midfielder for Championnat National 3 club Bourgoin-Jallieu.

== Club career ==
A youth of Eupen from the Aspire Academy, Niang thereafter moved to the Tunisian club CS Sfaxien.

Niang joined Châteauroux from CS Sfaxien on 3 August 2017, signing a three-year contract. He made his professional debut for Châteauroux in a 1–0 Ligue 2 win over Nîmes on 21 August 2017.

== International career ==
Niang represented the Senegal U20s at the 2015 FIFA U-20 World Cup.
