= Artur Kuznetsov (Ukrainian footballer) =

Ukrainian footballer

Personal information
- Full name: Artur Andriyovych Kuznetsov
- Date of birth: 9 March 1995 (age 31)
- Place of birth: Zaporizhia, Ukraine
- Height: 1.82 m (5 ft 11 1/2 in)
- Position: Defender

Youth career
- 2008–2012: Metalurh Zaporizhya

Senior career*
| Years | Team | Apps | (Gls) |
| 2012–2015 | Metalurh Zaporizhya | 10 | (0) |
| 2016–2017 | Chornomorets Odesa | 0 | (0) |
| 2018 | Metalurh Zaporizhya | 0 | (0) |

International career
| 2015 | Ukraine-20 | 4 | (0) |
- * Club domestic league appearances and goals as of 10 July 2018

Artur Kuznetsov (Ukrainian: Артур Андрійович Кузнецов; born 9 March 1995) is a Ukrainian football defender.

== Career ==
Kuznetsov is a product of youth team system FC Metalurh Zaporizhya. His first trainer was Oleksandr Rudyka.

He made his debut for FC Metalurh in the main-squad playing against FC Dnipro Dnipropetrovsk on 15 March 2015 in the Ukrainian Premier League.

In January 2016, he signed a contract with another Ukrainian Premier League side FC Chornomorets Odesa.
