= Carlos Arreola =

Mexican footballer (born 1995)

Personal information
- Full name: Carlos Alberto Arreola Rodríguez
- Date of birth: March 4, 1995 (age 31)
- Place of birth: Tala, Jalisco
- Height: 1.79 m (5 ft 10 1/2 in)
- Positions: Full-back; defensive midfielder

Youth career
- 2010–2015: Atlas

Senior career*
Years	Team	Apps	(Gls)
2015–2017	Atlas	10	(0)
2016	→ Tampico Madero (loan)	5	(0)
2017–2019	→ U. de C. (loan)	82	(8)
2020	Coras de Nayarit	6	(2)
2021–2022	Tecos	12	(1)
- * Club domestic league appearances and goals as of 6 July 2019

Carlos Alberto Arreola Rodríguez (born 4 March 1995) is a Mexican footballer who plays as a side-back and defensive midfielder for Ascenso MX squad Coras de Nayarit, on loan from Club Atlas de Guadalajara.

== Club career ==
=== Atlas ===
Arreola started his career with Atlas on 2011, playing for filial teams on the second and third divisions.

On 20 February 2015, Arreola made his official debut with Atlas in an away game against Club Santos Laguna. He played 66 minutes as a right-back in a line of 4, in a match celebrated in the Estadio Corona which Atlas won 0–1.

=== Tampico Madero ===
On 8 June 2016, Tampico Madero signed Arreola on loan from Club Atlas.

=== U. de C. ===
In 2017, Arreola signed with Loros UdeC on loan from Atlas.

== International career ==
Arreola was called up to the Mexican U18s in 2013. He later formed a part of the Mexico U20s team that participated in the 2015 FIFA U-20 World Cup.
