= Thomas Gösweiner =

Austrian footballer

Personal information
- Date of birth: 3 March 1995 (age 31)
- Place of birth: Leoben, Austria
- Height: 1.91 m (6 ft 3 in)
- Position: Forward

Team information
- Current team: SG Wattenscheid
- Number: 33

Youth career
- –2009: St. Peter-Freienstein
- 2009–2012: Admira

Senior career*
Years	Team	Apps	(Gls)
2012–2017	Admira Wacker II	72	(24)
2014	Admira Wacker	1	(0)
2016–2017	→ Sturm Graz II (loan)	24	(8)
2017–2018	Wormatia Worms	28	(11)
2018–2019	1899 Hoffenheim II	29	(10)
2019–2021	SV Elversberg	27	(8)
2021–2023	FC 08 Homburg	48	(14)
2023–2024	Hessen Kassel	19	(3)
2024–2026	1. FC Bocholt	25	(6)
2026–	SG Wattenscheid	3	(0)

International career
2012	Austria U18	1	(0)
2013–2014	Austria U19	6	(1)
2015	Austria U20	1	(1)
- * Club domestic league appearances and goals as of 23 September 2026

Thomas Gösweiner (born 3 March 1995) is an Austrian footballer currently playing as a forward for SG Wattenscheid of the German Regionalliga West.

== Career statistics ==
=== Club ===
As of 21 May 2018.

Appearances and goals by club, season and competition
Club	Season	League			Cup		Continental		Other		Total	
Club	Season	Division	Apps	Goals	Apps	Goals	Apps	Goals	Apps	Goals	Apps	Goals
Admira II	2011–12	Regionalliga	7	1	0	0	–		0	0	7	1
Admira II	2012–13	Regionalliga	15	2	0	0	–		0	0	15	2
Admira II	2013–14	Regionalliga	23	6	0	0	–		0	0	23	6
Admira II	2014–15	Regionalliga	10	8	0	0	–		0	0	10	8
Admira II	2015–16	Regionalliga	17	7	0	0	–		0	0	17	7
Admira II	Total		72	24	0	0	–		0	0	72	24
Admira	2013–14	Bundesliga	1	0	0	0	–		0	0	1	0
SK Sturm Graz II (loan)	2017–18	Regionalliga	24	8	0	0	–		0	0	24	8
Wormatia Worms	2017–18	Regionalliga Südwest	28	11	0	0	–		0	0	28	11
TSG 1899 Hoffenheim II	2018–19	Regionalliga Südwest	0	0	0	0	–		0	0	0	0
Career total			125	43	0	0	–		0	0	125	43
