= Tyroane Sandows =

South African footballer

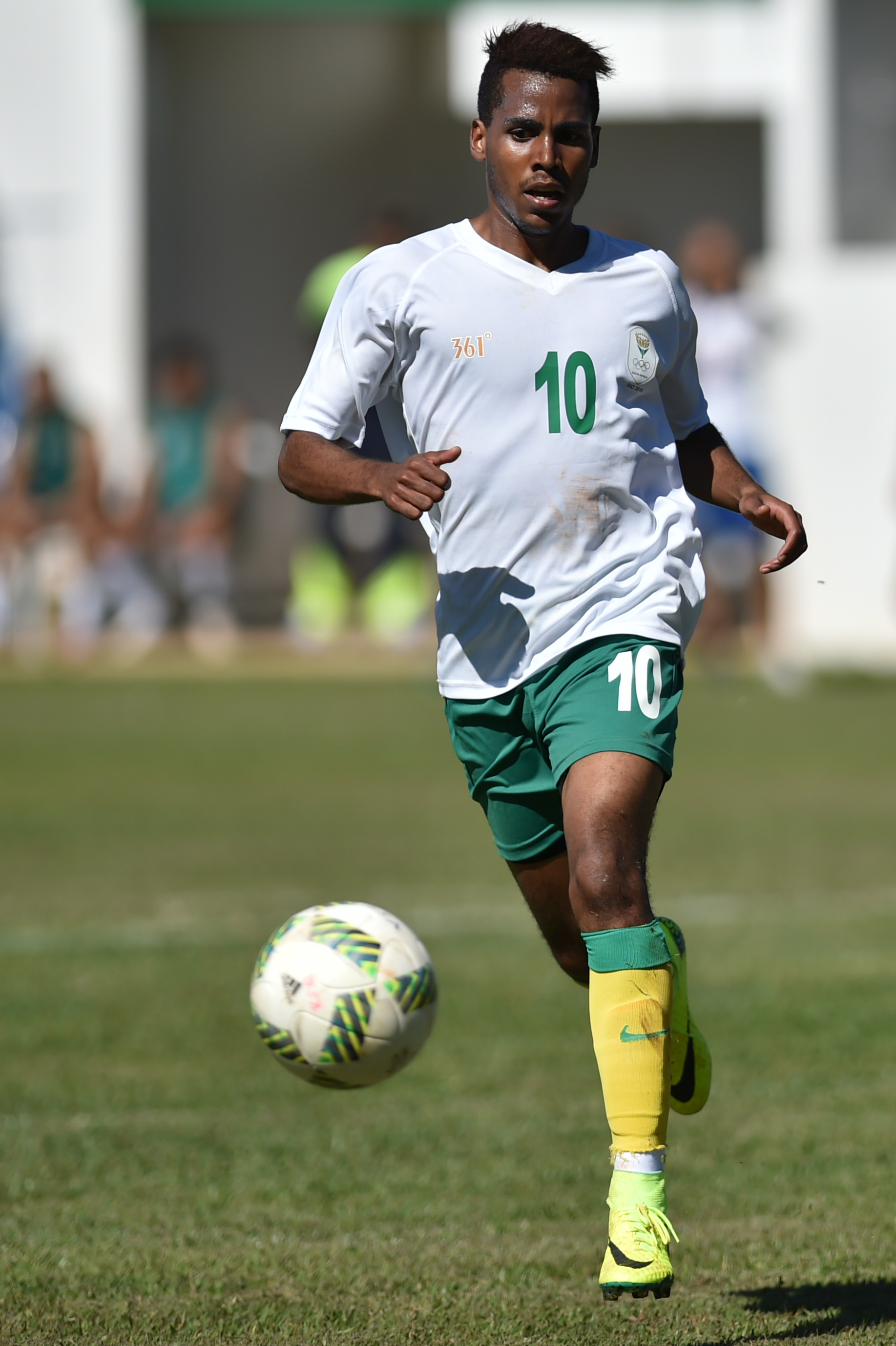
- Sandows in 2016

Personal information
- Full name: Tyroane Joe Sandows
- Date of birth: 12 February 1995 (age 31)
- Place of birth: Johannesburg, South Africa
- Height: 1.70 m (5 ft 7 in)
- Position: Winger

Youth career
- 2006–2014: São Paulo
- 2014–2015: Grêmio

Senior career*
Years	Team	Apps	(Gls)
2016–2017	Grêmio	4	(0)
2017–2018	Figueirense	5	(1)
2020–2021	Maritzburg United	3	(0)
2021–2022	Cape Town All Stars	4	(1)
2024	Independente Futebol Clube	5	(0)
2024–2025	Mitrovica	7	(0)

International career
2015	South Africa U20	3	(1)
- * Club domestic league appearances and goals as of 13:45, 2 September 2024 (UTC)

Tyroane Joe Sandows (born 12 February 1995), commonly known as Ty Sandows or simply Ty, is a South African professional footballer who last played as a winger for Mitrovica in the First League of Kosovo.

== Club career ==
On 25 September 2016, Tyroane made his professional debut with Grêmio in a 2016 Campeonato Brasileiro Série A match against Chapecoense. On 20 November, he assisted Miller Bolaños's goal in a 3–0 home victory against América Mineiro.

On 6 September 2017, after being released by Grêmio when his contract expired, he signed a two-year deal with Série B side Figueirense.

== International career ==
He represented South Africa in the football competition at the 2016 Summer Olympics.

== Personal life ==
Tyroane was born in Johannesburg. He moved to São Paulo in 2006 to pursue a professional football career.

== Career statistics ==
As of match played 30 March 2017

Appearances and goals by club, season and competition
Club	Season	League			National Cup		League Cup		Continental		Other		Total	
Club	Season	Division	Apps	Goals	Apps	Goals	Apps	Goals	Apps	Goals	Apps	Goals	Apps	Goals
Grêmio	2016	Série A	4	0	0	0	0	0	0	0	0	0	4	0
Grêmio	2017	Série A	0	0	0	0	0	0	0	0	3	0	3	0
Total			4	0	0	0	0	0	0	0	3	0	7	0
Career total			4	0	0	0	0	0	0	0	3	0	7	0

== Honours ==
=== Club ===
Grêmio

- Copa do Brasil: 2016
