= Alassane Sow =

Senegalese footballer

Personal information
- Date of birth: 3 January 1997 (age 29)
- Height: 1.70 m (5 ft 7 in)
- Position: Midfielder

Youth career
- –2016: Real Zaragoza

Senior career*
Years	Team	Apps	(Gls)
2016–2018	Bizertin	7	(0)

International career^{‡}
2015	Senegal U20	7	(0)
- * Club domestic league appearances and goals as of 9:16, 28 May 2020 (UTC) ‡ National team caps and goals as of 9:16, 28 May 2020 (UTC)

Alassane Sow (born 3 January 1997) is a Senegalese footballer who last played for Bizertin.

== Career statistics ==
=== Club ===
As of 28 May 2020.

Club	Season	League			Cup		Continental		Other		Total	
Club	Season	Division	Apps	Goals	Apps	Goals	Apps	Goals	Apps	Goals	Apps	Goals
Bizertin	2015–16	CLP-1	3	0	1 (Note: Appearances in the Tunisian Cup)	0	–		0	0	4	0
Bizertin	2016–17	CLP-1	4	0	1	0	–		1	0	6	0
Career total			7	0	2	0	0	0	1	0	10	0
