= Clifford Aboagye =

Ghanaian footballer (born 1995)

Personal information
- Full name: Clifford Aboagye
- Date of birth: 11 February 1995 (age 31)
- Place of birth: Accra, Ghana
- Height: 1.63 m (5 ft 4 in)
- Position: Attacking midfielder

Team information
- Current team: Anorthosis Famagusta
- Number: 20

Youth career
- Inter Allies

Senior career*
Years	Team	Apps	(Gls)
2012–2013	Inter Allies		
2013–2016	Granada B	84	(8)
2015–2017	Granada	0	(0)
2017	→ Atlas (loan)	15	(1)
2018–2019	Atlas	48	(1)
2019–2020	→ Querétaro (loan)	30	(1)
2020–2021	Tijuana	9	(0)
2021-2022	→ Puebla (loan)	5	(0)
2022–2023	Querétaro	21	(1)
2025–	Anorthosis Famagusta	22	(1)

International career
2013–2015	Ghana U20	9	(1)
- * Club domestic league appearances and goals as of 14 June 2026

Clifford Aboagye (born 11 February 1995) is a Ghanaian professional footballer who plays as an attacking midfielder for Cypriot club Anorthosis Famagusta.

== Club career ==
Born in Accra, Aboagye made his senior debuts for International Allies, being promoted to Ghana Premier League in his first and only season. In July 2013 the club accepted a $800,000 bid from Udinese, and he signed a five-year contract with the Serie A club; he was subsequently loaned to Granada CF, linking up with the Andalusians also until 2018 and being assigned to the reserves in Segunda División B.

On 8 January 2015 Aboagye made his professional debut, coming on as a second half substitute for Riki in a 1–2 home loss against Sevilla FC, for the campaign's Copa del Rey. He left the club on 22 December of the following year, after only representing the B-side.

On 2 January 2017, Aboagye signed a six-month loan deal with Liga MX side Club Atlas. On 12 December 2017, the club made his transfer permanent. On 12 July 2019, fellow Liga MX club Querétaro, announced the signing of Aboagye on a season-long loan.

On 29 June 2020, Tijuana announced the signing of Aboagye on a one-year deal. He was loaned out to Puebla on 15 December 2020, for the upcoming Clausura 2021.

On 9 July 2022, Querétaro announced the return of Aboagye, signing him on a free transfer. On June 30, 2023, it was announced that Aboagye would run out his contract with the club, becoming a free agent.

== International career ==
Aboagye appeared with Ghana under-20s in 2013 FIFA U-20 World Cup, being named the Bronze Ball of the tournament as his side finished third.

== Honours ==
Ghana U20

- FIFA U-20 World Cup third place: 2013
- African U-20 Championship runner-up: 2013

Individual

- FIFA U-20 World Cup Bronze Ball: 2013
- African U-20 Championship Team of the Tournament: 2015
