= 2015 African U-20 Championship =

Coupe d'Afrique des nations junior 2015

Tournament details
- Host country: Senegal
- Dates: 8–22 March
- Teams: 8 (from 1 confederation)
- Venue: 2 (in 2 host cities)

Final positions
- Champions: Nigeria (7th title)
- Runners-up: Senegal
- Third place: Ghana
- Fourth place: Mali

Tournament statistics
- Matches played: 16
- Goals scored: 53 (3.31 per match)
- Top scorer(s): (Nigeria) Musa Muhammed (4 goals)
- Best player: (Ghana) Yaw Yeboah
- Fair play award: Nigeria

The 2015 African U-20 Championship was the 20th edition of the biennial international youth football tournament organized by the Confederation of African Football (CAF) for players aged 20 and below. The tournament took place in Senegal between 8–22 March 2015.

The semi-finalists of the tournament qualified for the 2015 FIFA U-20 World Cup in New Zealand. Nigeria won the tournament, and were joined by hosts Senegal, Ghana, and Mali as CAF qualifiers for the 2015 FIFA U-20 World Cup.

== Qualification ==
The qualifiers were played between April and August 2014. At the end of the qualification phase, seven teams joined the hosts Senegal.

=== Qualified teams ===
- Congo
- Ghana
- Ivory Coast
- Mali
- Nigeria
- Senegal (hosts)
- South Africa
- Zambia

== Venues ==
Cities	Venues	Capacity
Dakar	Stade Léopold Sédar Senghor	60,000
M'Bour	Stade Caroline Faye	5,000

== Match officials ==
The referees were:

Referees

- (Botswana) Joshua Bondo
- (Burkina Faso) Juste Ephrem Zio
- (Burundi) Thierry Nkurunziza
- (Cameroon) Aurélien Juenkou Wandji
- (Egypt) Ibrahim Nour El Din
- (Ivory Coast) Bienvenu Sinko
- (Kenya) Davies Ogenche Omweno
- (Libya) Mohamed Ragab Omar
- (Mali) Mahamadou Keita
- (Morocco) Rédouane Jiyed
- (Senegal) Daouda Gueye
- (Somalia) Hagi Yabarow Wiish
- (Sudan) Mutaz Abdelbasit Khairalla

Assistant referees

- (Algeria) Mokrane Gourari
- (Cameroon) Elvis Guy Noupue Nguegoue
- (Chad) Issa Yaya
- (Democratic Republic of the Congo) Olivier Safari Kabene
- (Eritrea) Berhe O'Michael
- (Ethiopia) Kindie Mussie
- (Ghana) David Laryea
- (Guinea) Sidiki Sidibe
- (Mauritania) Abderahmane Warr
- (Nigeria) Abel Baba
- (Senegal) Ababacar Sene
- (Seychelles) Hensley Danny Petrousse
- (South Africa) Mothibidi Stevens Khumalo
- (Tunisia) Faouzi Jridi
- (Uganda) Mark Ssonko

== Draw ==
The draw for the final tournament was held on 21 December 2014, 11:00 UTC+02:00, at the CAF Headquarters in Cairo, Egypt. Senegal and Ghana were seeded and placed into Groups A and B respectively.

== Squads ==
Each team could register a squad of 21 players (three of whom had to be goalkeepers).

== Group stage ==
The group winners and runners-up advanced to the semi-finals and qualified for the 2015 FIFA U-20 World Cup.

Tiebreakers

The teams were ranked according to points (3 points for a win, 1 point for a draw, 0 points for a loss). If tied on points, tiebreakers were applied in the following order:

1. Number of points obtained in games between the teams concerned;
2. Goal difference in games between the teams concerned;
3. Goals scored in games between the teams concerned;
4. Goal difference in all games;
5. Goals scored in all games;
6. Fair Play point system in which the number of yellow and red cards were evaluated;
7. Drawing of lots.

All times are UTC±00:00.

=== Group A ===
Pos	Team	Pld	W	D	L	GF	GA	GD	Pts	Qualification
1	Nigeria	3	2	1	0	9	4	+5	7	Knockout stage and 2015 FIFA U-20 World Cup
2	Senegal (H)	3	1	1	1	7	8	−1	4	Knockout stage and 2015 FIFA U-20 World Cup
3	Ivory Coast	3	0	3	0	5	5	0	3	
4	Congo	3	0	1	2	5	9	−4	1	

Source: CAF
(H) Hosts
8 March 2015
16:30

Senegal	1–3	Nigeria
Sarr 27'	Report	Awoniyi 9', 12'; Matthew 43'

Stade Léopold Sédar Senghor, Dakar
Referee: Rédouane Jiyed (Morocco)
8 March 2015
19:30

Congo	1–1	Ivory Coast
Ganvoula 75'	Report	Meite 37'

Stade Léopold Sédar Senghor, Dakar
Referee: Davies Ogenche Omweno (Kenya)

11 March 2015
16:30

Nigeria	4–1	Congo
Matthew 4'; Muhammed 35' (pen.), 56' (pen.); Awoniyi 87'	Report	Ganvoula 61'

Stade Léopold Sédar Senghor, Dakar
Referee: Mahamadou Keita (Mali)
11 March 2015
19:30

Ivory Coast	2–2	Senegal
Angban 8'; Bedia 89'	Report	Wadji 51', 56'

Stade Léopold Sédar Senghor, Dakar
Referee: Joshua Bondo (Botswana)

14 March 2015
17:00

Senegal	4–3	Congo
Niang 15'; Wadji 36'; Sarr 87', 90'	Report	Nkounkou 20'; Ganvoula 55'; Bakaki 66'

Stade Léopold Sédar Senghor, Dakar
Referee: Thierry Nkurunziza (Burundi)
14 March 2015
17:00

Nigeria	2–2	Ivory Coast
Pyagbara 27'; Muhammed 68' (pen.)	Report	Niangbo 5'; Bedia 32'

Stade Caroline Faye, M'Bour
Referee: Mutaz Abdelbasit Khairalla (Sudan)

=== Group B ===
Pos	Team	Pld	W	D	L	GF	GA	GD	Pts	Qualification
1	Mali	3	3	0	0	4	1	+3	9	Knockout stage and 2015 FIFA U-20 World Cup
2	Ghana	3	2	0	1	4	2	+2	6	Knockout stage and 2015 FIFA U-20 World Cup
3	South Africa	3	1	0	2	6	6	0	3	
4	Zambia	3	0	0	3	3	8	−5	0	

Source: CAF
9 March 2015
16:30

Ghana	2–0	South Africa
Masiya 9' (o.g.); B. Tetteh 44'	Report

Stade Caroline Faye, M'Bour
Referee: Ibrahim Nour El Din (Egypt)
9 March 2015
19:30

Mali	1–0	Zambia
Diallo 75'	Report

Stade Caroline Faye, M'Bour
Referee: Hagi Yabarow Wiish (Somalia)

12 March 2015
16:30

South Africa	1–2	Mali
Madisha 71' (pen.)	Report	H. Traoré 77', 86'

Stade Caroline Faye, M'Bour
Referee: Mohamed Ragab Omar (Libya)
12 March 2015
19:30

Zambia	1–2	Ghana
D. Daka 2'	Report	Attobrah 26'; Afful 85'

Stade Caroline Faye, M'Bour
Referee: Daouda Gueye (Senegal)

15 March 2015
17:00

Ghana	0–1	Mali
	Report	I. Diarra 18'

Stade Caroline Faye, M'Bour
Referee: Aurélien Juenkou Wandji (Cameroon)
15 March 2015
17:00

South Africa	5–2	Zambia
Zuma 22', 63'; Sandows 57', 66', 87'	Report	Seriba 30' (o.g.); Zulu 90'

Stade Léopold Sédar Senghor, Dakar
Referee: Juste Ephrem Zio (Burkina Faso)

== Knockout stage ==
In the knockout stage, if a match was level at the end of normal playing time, extra time was played (two periods of 15 minutes each) and followed, if necessary, by a penalty shoot-out to determine the winner, except for the play-off for third place where no extra time was played.

Semi-finals
18 March
Nigeria	2
Ghana	0
19 March
Mali	1
Senegal	2

Final
22 March
Nigeria	1
Senegal	0
Third place
22 March
Ghana	3
Mali	1

=== Semi-finals ===
18 March 2015
17:00

Nigeria	2–0	Ghana
Nwobodo 23'; Muhammed 71' (pen.)	Report

Stade Léopold Sédar Senghor, Dakar
Referee: Rédouane Jiyed (Morocco)

19 March 2015
17:00

Mali	1–2	Senegal
Diallo 5'	Report	Koné 2', 81'

Stade Léopold Sédar Senghor, Dakar
Referee: Ibrahim Nour El Din (Egypt)

=== Third place match ===
22 March 2015
16:30

Ghana	3–1	Mali
Yeboah 24', 65'; Aboagye 70'	Report	Touré 84'

Stade Léopold Sédar Senghor, Dakar
Referee: Mutaz Abdelbasit Khairalla (Sudan)

=== Final ===
22 March 2015
19:30

Nigeria	1–0	Senegal
Bulbwa 17'	Report

Stade Léopold Sédar Senghor, Dakar
Referee: Joshua Bondo (Botswana)

== Awards ==
- Fair play trophy: Nigeria
- Orange Man of the tournament: (Ghana) Yaw Yeboah
- Best goal of the tournament: (Nigeria) Bernard Bulbwa against Senegal in the final

=== Team of the tournament ===
Starting Eleven

- (Nigeria) Enaholo Joshua
- (Nigeria) Musa Muhammed
- (Mali) Souleymane Diarra
- (Senegal) Mouhameth Sané
- (Senegal) Sidy Sarr
- (Mali) Alassane Diallo
- (Senegal) Ibrahima Wadji
- (Ghana) Yaw Yeboah
- (Nigeria) Idowu Elijah
- (Ghana) Clifford Aboagye
- (Nigeria) Taiwo Awoniyi

Substitutes

- (Mali) Sory Ibrahim Traore
- (Ghana) Joseph Aidoo
- (Nigeria) Ifeanyi Matthew
- (Nigeria) Omego Prince
- (South Africa) Tyroane Joe Sandows
- (Republic of the Congo) Silvere Ganvoula Mboussy
- (Mali) Malick Toure
- (Ghana) Prosper Kassim

== Goalscorers ==
4 goals

- (Nigeria) Musa Muhammed

3 goals

- (Republic of the Congo) Silvère Ganvoula
- (Nigeria) Taiwo Awoniyi
- (Senegal) Sidy Sarr
- (Senegal) Ibrahima Wadji
- (South Africa) Tyroane Sandows

2 goals

- (Ivory Coast) Chris Bedia
- (Ghana) Yaw Yeboah
- (Mali) Alassane Diallo
- (Mali) Hamidou Traoré
- (Nigeria) Ifeanyi Matthew
- (South Africa) Dumisani Zuma
- (Senegal) Moussa Koné

1 goal

- (Republic of the Congo) Constantin Bakaki
- (Republic of the Congo) Moise Nkounkou
- (Ghana) Clifford Aboagye
- (Ghana) Samuel Afful
- (Ghana) Asiedu Attobrah
- (Ghana) Benjamin Tetteh
- (Ivory Coast) Victorien Angban
- (Ivory Coast) Yakou Meite
- (Ivory Coast) Dogbole Niangbo
- (Mali) Ichaka Diarra
- (Mali) Malick Touré
- (Nigeria) Bernard Bulbwa
- (Nigeria) Obinna Nwobodo
- (Nigeria) Christian Pyagbara
- (Senegal) El Hadji Malick Niang
- (South Africa) Motjeka Madisha
- (Zambia) Dave Daka
- (Zambia) Charles Zulu

Own goal

- (South Africa) Thamsanqa Masiya (against Ghana)
- (South Africa) Kabelo Seriba (against Zambia)

== See also ==
- 2015 African U-17 Championship
