= Timeline of women in mathematics =

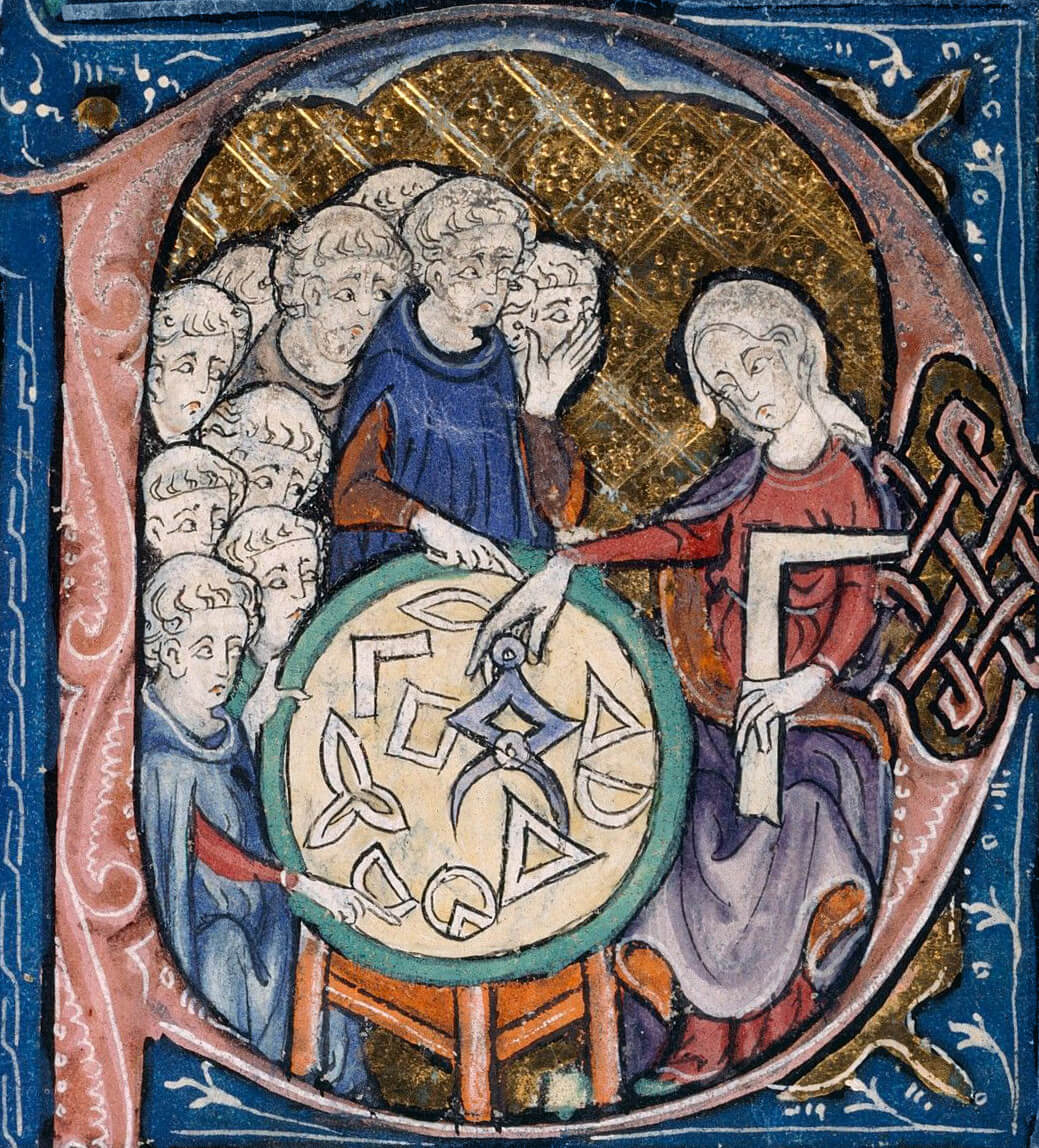
Detail from illuminated manuscript of a woman teaching geometry. In her left hand she holds a square, an implement for testing or drawing right angles. She is watched by a group of students. Created between 1309 and 1316.

This is a timeline of women in mathematics.

== Timeline ==
=== Classical Age ===
- Before 350: Pandrosion, a Greek mathematician known for an approximate solution to doubling the cube and a simplified exact solution to the construction of the geometric mean.
- c. 350–370 until 415: The lifetime of Hypatia, a Greek Neoplatonist philosopher in Roman Egypt who was the first well-documented woman in mathematics.

=== 18th Century ===
- 1748: Italian mathematician Maria Agnesi published the first book discussing both differential and integral calculus, which was called Instituzioni analitiche ad uso della gioventù italiana.
- 1759: French mathematician Émilie du Châtelet's translation and commentary on Isaac Newton’s work Principia Mathematica was published posthumously; it is still considered the standard French translation.
- c. 1787 – 1797: Self-taught Chinese astronomer Wang Zhenyi published at least twelve books and multiple articles on astronomy and mathematics.

=== 19th Century ===
- 1827: French mathematician Sophie Germain saw her theorem, known as Sophie Germain's theorem, published in a footnote of a book by the mathematician Adrien-Marie Legendre. In this theorem Germain proved that if x, y, and z are integers and if x^{5} + y^{5} = z^{5} then either x, y, or z must be divisible by 5. Germain's theorem was a major step toward proving Fermat's Last Theorem for the case where n equals 5.
- 1829: The first public examination of an American girl in geometry was held.
- 1858: Florence Nightingale became the first female member of the Royal Statistical Society.
- 1873: Sarah Woodhead of Britain became the first woman to take the Cambridge Mathematical Tripos Exam, which she passed.
- 1874: Russian mathematician Sofya Kovalevskaya became the first woman to earn a doctorate (in the modern sense) in mathematics.
- 1880: Charlotte Angas Scott of Britain obtained special permission to take the Cambridge Mathematical Tripos Exam, as women were not normally allowed to sit for the exam. She came eighth on the Tripos of all students taking them, but due to her sex, the title of "eighth wrangler," a high honour, went officially to a male student. At the ceremony, however, after the seventh wrangler had been announced, all the students in the audience shouted her name. Because she could not attend the award ceremony, Scott celebrated her accomplishment at Girton College where there were cheers and clapping at dinner, and a special evening ceremony where the students sang "See the Conquering Hero Comes", and she received an ode written by a staff member, and was crowned with laurels.
- 1885: Charlotte Angas Scott became the first British woman to receive a doctorate in mathematics, which she received from the University of London.
- 1886: Winifred Edgerton Merrill became the first American woman to earn a PhD in mathematics, which she earned from Columbia University.
- 1888: The Kovalevskaya top, one of a brief list of known examples of integrable rigid body motion, was discovered by Sofya Kovalevskaya.
- 1889: Sofya Kovalevskaya was appointed as Ordinary Professor (full professor) in mathematics at Stockholm University, making her the first woman in Europe in modern times to hold such a position.
- 1890: Philippa Fawcett of Britain became the first woman to obtain the top score in the Cambridge Mathematical Tripos Exam. Her score was 13 per cent higher than the second highest score. When the women's list was announced, Fawcett was described as "above the Senior Wrangler", but she did not receive the title of Senior Wrangler, as at that time only men could receive degrees from Cambridge and therefore only men were eligible for the Senior Wrangler title.
- 1891: Charlotte Angas Scott of Britain became the first woman to join the American Mathematical Society, then called the New York Mathematical Society.
- 1891: Cornelia Fabri of Italy became the first woman to earn a doctorate in math from the University of Pisa.
- 1894: Charlotte Angas Scott of Britain became the first woman on the first Council of the American Mathematical Society.
- 1897: Four women attended the inaugural International Congress of Mathematicians in Zurich in 1897 - Charlotte Angas Scott, Iginia Massarini, Vera von Schiff, and Charlotte Wedell.

=== 20th Century ===
- 1911: Swedish mathematician Louise Petrén-Overton became the first woman in Sweden with a doctorate in mathematics.
- 1913: American mathematician Mildred Sanderson earned her PhD for a thesis that included an important theorem about modular invariants.
- 1918: German mathematician Emmy Noether published Noether's (first) theorem, which states that any differentiable symmetry of the action of a physical system has a corresponding conservation law.
- 1927: American mathematician Anna Pell-Wheeler became the first woman to present a lecture at the American Mathematical Society Colloquium.
- 1930: Cecilia Kreiger became the first woman to earn a PhD in mathematics in Canada, at the University of Toronto.
- 1930s: British mathematician Mary Cartwright proved her theorem, now known as Cartwright's theorem, which gives an estimate for the maximum modulus of an analytic function that takes the same value no more than p times in the unit disc. To prove the theorem she used a new approach, applying a technique introduced by Lars Ahlfors for conformal mappings.
- 1943: Euphemia Haynes became the first African-American woman to earn a Ph.D. in mathematics, which she earned from Catholic University of America.
- 1944: Helen Walker became the first female president of the American Statistical Association.
- 1949: American mathematician Gertrude Mary Cox became the first woman elected into the International Statistical Institute.
- 1949: Maria Laura Lopes became the first woman in Brazil to earn a PhD in mathematics.
- 1951: Mary Cartwright of Britain became the first female president of the Mathematical Association.
- 1956: American mathematician Gladys West began collecting data from satellites at the Naval Surface Warfare Center Dahlgren Division. Her calculations directly impacted the development of accurate GPS systems.

==== 1960s ====
- 1960 and 1966: British mathematician Lucy Joan Slater published two books about the hypergeometric functions from the Cambridge University Press.
- 1960s: American research mathematician Katherine Johnson and other female African-American computers working for NASA calculated flight trajectories for space missions, including calculations integral to the Apollo program.
- 1961: Mary Cartwright of Britain became the first woman to be President of the London Mathematical Society.
- 1962: American mathematician Mina Rees became the first person to receive the Award for Distinguished Service to Mathematics from the Mathematical Association of America.
- 1963: Grace Alele-Williams became the first Nigerian woman to earn a Ph.D when she defended her thesis in Mathematics Education at the University of Chicago (U.S.)
- 1964: Mary Cartwright of Britain became the first woman to be given the Sylvester Medal of the Royal Society.
- 1965: Scottish mathematician Elizabeth McHarg became the first female president of the Edinburgh Mathematical Society.
- 1966: American mathematician Mary L. Boas published Mathematical Methods in the Physical Sciences, which was still widely used in college classrooms as of 1999.
- 1968: Mary Cartwright of Britain became the first woman to be given the De Morgan Medal, the London Mathematical Society’s premier award.

==== 1970s ====
- 1970: American mathematician Mina Rees became the first female president of the American Association for the Advancement of Science.
- 1971: American mathematician Mary Ellen Rudin constructed the first Dowker space.
- 1971: The Association for Women in Mathematics (AWM) was founded. It is a professional society whose mission is to encourage women and girls to study and to have active careers in the mathematical sciences, and to promote equal opportunity for and the equal treatment of women and girls in the mathematical sciences. It is incorporated in the state of Massachusetts.
- 1971: The American Mathematical Society established its Joint Committee on Women in the Mathematical Sciences (JCW), which later became a joint committee of multiple scholarly societies.
- 1973: American mathematician Jean Taylor published her dissertation on "Regularity of the Singular Set of Two-Dimensional Area-Minimizing Flat Chains Modulo 3 in R3" which solved a long-standing problem about length and smoothness of soap-film triple function curves.
- 1974: Joan Birman published the book Braids, Links, and Mapping Class Groups, which was the first book devoted to braid groups.
- 1975: American mathematician Julia Robinson became the first female mathematician elected to the National Academy of Sciences.
- 1975: Stella Cunliffe became the first female president of the Royal Statistical Society.
- 1976-1977: Marjorie Rice, an amateur American mathematician, discovered four new types of tessellating pentagons in 1976 and 1977.
- 1979: American mathematician Dorothy Lewis Bernstein became the first female president of the Mathematical Association of America.
- 1979: American mathematician Mary Ellen Rudin became the first woman to present the Mathematical Association of America’s Earle Raymond Hedrick Lectures, intended to showcase skilled expositors and enrich the understanding of instructors of college-level mathematics.

==== 1980s ====
- 1981: Canadian-American mathematician Cathleen Morawetz became the first woman to give the Gibbs Lecture of the American Mathematical Society.
- 1981: American mathematician Doris Schattschneider became the first female editor of Mathematics Magazine, a refereed bimonthly publication of the Mathematical Association of America.
- 1982: Rebecca Walo Omana became the first female mathematics professor in the Democratic Republic of the Congo.
- 1983: American mathematician Julia Robinson was elected the first female president of the American Mathematical Society for the term of 1983-1984 (but was unable to complete her term as she was suffering from leukemia), and became the first female mathematician to be awarded a MacArthur Fellowship.
- 1986: European Women in Mathematics (EWM) was founded as an organization in 1986 by Bodil Branner, Caroline Series, Gudrun Kalmbach, Marie-Françoise Roy, and Dona Strauss, inspired by the activities of the Association for Women in Mathematics in the USA. It is the "first and best known" of several organizations devoted to women in mathematics in Europe.
- 1987: Eileen Poiani became the first female president of Pi Mu Epsilon.
- 1988: American mathematician Doris Schattschneider became the first woman to present the Mathematical Association of America’s J. Sutherland Frame Lectures.

==== 1990s ====
- 1992: Australian mathematician Cheryl Praeger became the first female President of the Australian Mathematical Society.
- 1992: American mathematician Gloria Gilmer became the first woman to deliver a major National Association of Mathematicians lecture (it was the Cox-Talbot address).
- 1992: Ruth Hendry became the first female Senior Wrangler.
- 1995: American mathematician Margaret Wright became the first female president of the Society for Industrial and Applied Mathematics.
- 1995: Israeli-Canadian mathematician Leah Edelstein-Keshet became the first female president of the Society for Mathematical Biology.
- 1995: Ina Kersten became the president of the German Mathematical Society, which meant she was the first woman to head the society.
- 1996: American mathematician Joan Birman became the first woman to receive the Mathematical Association of America’s Chauvenet Prize.
- 1996: Katherine Heinrich became the first female President of the Canadian Mathematical Society.
- 1996: Ioana Dumitriu, a New York University sophomore from Romania, became the first woman to be named a Putnam Fellow. Putnam Fellows are the top five (or six, in case of a tie) scorers on The William Lowell Putnam Mathematical Competition.
- 1998: Bodil Branner was the first woman to lead the Danish Mathematical Society, which she did from 1998 to 2002.
- 1998: Melanie Wood became the first female American to make the U.S. International Math Olympiad Team. She won silver medals in the 1998 and 1999 International Mathematical Olympiads.

=== 21st Century ===
==== 2000s ====
- 2002: Susan Howson became the first woman to be given the Adams Prize, given annually by the University of Cambridge to a British mathematician under the age of 40.
- 2002: Melanie Wood became the first American woman and second woman overall to be named a Putnam Fellow in 2002. Putnam Fellows are the top five (or six, in case of a tie) scorers on William Lowell Putnam Mathematical Competition.
- 2004: American Melanie Wood became the first woman to win the Frank and Brennie Morgan Prize for Outstanding Research in Mathematics by an Undergraduate Student. It is an annual award given to an undergraduate student in the US, Canada, or Mexico who demonstrates superior mathematics research.
- 2004: American Alison Miller became the first female gold medal winner on the U.S. International Mathematical Olympiad Team.
- 2006: Polish-Canadian mathematician Nicole Tomczak-Jaegermann became the first woman to win the CRM-Fields-PIMS prize.
- 2006: Stefanie Petermichl, a German mathematical analyst then at the University of Texas at Austin, became the first woman to win the Salem Prize, an annual award given to young mathematicians who have worked in Raphael Salem's field of interest, chiefly topics in analysis related to Fourier series. She shared the prize with Artur Avila.
- 2006: When Olga Gil Medrano became president of the Royal Spanish Mathematical Society in 2006, she was the first woman elected to that position.

==== 2010s ====
- 2011: Belgian mathematician Ingrid Daubechies became the first female president of the International Mathematical Union.
- 2012: The Working Committee for Women in Mathematics, Chinese Mathematical Society (WCWM-CMS) was founded; it is a national non-profit academic organization in which female mathematicians who are engaged in research, teaching, and applications of mathematics can share their scientific research through academic exchanges both in China and abroad. It is one of the branches of the Chinese Mathematical Society (CMS).
- 2013: The African Women in Mathematics Association was founded. This professional organization with over 300 members promotes mathematics to African women and girls and supports female mathematicians.
- 2014: Maryam Mirzakhani became the first woman as well as the first Iranian to be awarded the Fields Medal, which she was awarded for "her outstanding contributions to the dynamics and geometry of Riemann surfaces and their moduli spaces." That year the Fields Medal was also awarded to Martin Hairer, Manjul Bhargava, and Artur Avila. It is a prize awarded to two, three, or four mathematicians not over 40 years of age at each International Congress of the International Mathematical Union, and is often viewed as the greatest honor a mathematician can receive.
- 2016: French mathematician Claire Voisin received the CNRS Gold medal, the highest scientific research award in France.
- 2016: The London Mathematical Society's Women in Mathematics Committee was awarded the Royal Society's inaugural Athena Prize.
- 2017: Nouzha El Yacoubi became the first female president of the African Mathematical Union.
- 2019: American mathematician Karen Uhlenbeck became the first woman to win the Abel Prize, with the award committee citing "the fundamental impact of her work on analysis, geometry and mathematical physics."
- 2019: Marissa Loving became the first Native Hawaiian woman to earn a PhD in mathematics when she graduated from the University of Illinois Urbana-Champaign in 2019. In addition to being Native Hawaiian, she is also black, Japanese, and Puerto Rican.

==== 2020s ====
- 2020: Lisa Piccirillo published a mathematical proof in the journal Annals of Mathematics determining that the Conway knot is not a smoothly slice knot, answering an unsolved problem in knot theory first proposed over fifty years prior by English mathematician John Horton Conway.
- 2020: Sarah B. Hart was appointed to be the Gresham Professor of Geometry in Gresham College, making her the first woman to hold this position "since the chair was established in 1597".
- 2022: Maryna Viazovska was awarded the Fields Medal in July 2022, making her the second woman (after Maryam Mirzakhani), the second person born in the Ukrainian SSR and the first with a degree from a Ukrainian university to ever receive it. That year the Fields Medal was also awarded to Hugo Duminil-Copin, June Huh, and James Maynard. The Fields Medal is a prize awarded to two, three, or four mathematicians not over 40 years of age at each International Congress of the International Mathematical Union, and is often viewed as the greatest honor a mathematician can receive.
- 2023: Ingrid Daubechies was awarded the Wolf Prize in Mathematics in February 2023, becoming the first woman to receive this award.
- 2024: Claire Voisin became the first woman awarded the Crafoord Prize in Mathematics.
- 2025: Magdalena Pudełko became the first female winner of Poland's National Mathematics Olympiad; she shared the win with male contestant Mateusz Wawrzyniak, and she was also the first female contestant to earn the highest scores in both the final and earlier rounds of the contest.
- 2026: Hong Wang became the first Chinese woman to be awarded the Fields Medal. She was awarded it for her contributions to harmonic analysis and geometric measure theory, including the proof of the three-dimensional Kakeya conjecture. That year it was also awarded to Yu Deng, John Pardon, and Jacob Tsimerman. It is a prize awarded to two, three, or four mathematicians not over 40 years of age at each International Congress of the International Mathematical Union, and is often viewed as the greatest honor a mathematician can receive.

== See also ==
- List of women in mathematics
- Timeline of mathematical innovation in South and West Asia
- Timeline of mathematics
- Timeline of women in mathematics in the United States
