= Timeline of women in mathematics in the United States =

There is a long history of women in mathematics in the United States. All women mentioned here are American unless otherwise noted.

== Timeline ==
=== 19th Century ===
- 1829: The first public examination of an American girl in geometry was held.
- 1886: Winifred Edgerton Merrill became the first American woman to earn a PhD in mathematics, which she earned from Columbia University.
- 1891: Charlotte Angas Scott of Britain became the first woman to join the American Mathematical Society, then called the New York Mathematical Society.
- 1894: Charlotte Angas Scott of Britain became the first woman on the first Council of the American Mathematical Society.

=== 20th Century ===
- 1913: Mildred Sanderson earned her PhD for a thesis that included an important theorem about modular invariants.
- 1927: Anna Pell-Wheeler became the first woman to present a lecture at the American Mathematical Society Colloquium.
- 1943: Euphemia Haynes became the first African-American woman to earn a Ph.D. in mathematics, which she earned from Catholic University of America.
- 1949: Gertrude Mary Cox became the first woman elected into the International Statistical Institute.
- 1956: Gladys West began collecting data from satellites at the Naval Surface Warfare Center Dahlgren Division. Her calculations directly impacted the development of accurate GPS systems.
- 1962: Mina Rees became the first person to receive the Award for Distinguished Service to Mathematics from the Mathematical Association of America.
- 1966: Mary L. Boas published Mathematical Methods in the Physical Sciences, which was still widely used in college classrooms as of 1999.

==== 1970s ====
- 1970: Mina Rees became the first female president of the American Association for the Advancement of Science.
- 1971:
  - Mary Ellen Rudin constructed the first Dowker space.
  - The Association for Women in Mathematics (AWM) was founded. It is a professional society whose mission is to encourage women and girls to study and to have active careers in the mathematical sciences, and to promote equal opportunity for and the equal treatment of women and girls in the mathematical sciences. It is incorporated in the state of Massachusetts.
  - The American Mathematical Society established its Joint Committee on Women in the Mathematical Sciences (JCW), which later became a joint committee of multiple scholarly societies.
- 1973: Jean Taylor published her dissertation on "Regularity of the Singular Set of Two-Dimensional Area-Minimizing Flat Chains Modulo 3 in R3" which solved a long-standing problem about length and smoothness of soap-film triple function curves.
- 1974: Joan Birman published the book Braids, Links, and Mapping Class Groups, which was the first book devoted to braid groups.
- 1975: Julia Robinson became the first female mathematician elected to the National Academy of Sciences.
- 1976-1977: Marjorie Rice, an amateur mathematician, discovered four new types of tessellating pentagons in 1976 and 1977.
- 1979:
  - Dorothy Lewis Bernstein became the first female president of the Mathematical Association of America.
  - Mary Ellen Rudin became the first woman to present the Mathematical Association of America’s Earle Raymond Hedrick Lectures, intended to showcase skilled expositors and enrich the understanding of instructors of college-level mathematics.

==== 1980s ====
- 1981: Canadian-American mathematician Cathleen Morawetz became the first woman to give the Gibbs Lecture of the American Mathematical Society.
- 1981: Doris Schattschneider became the first female editor of Mathematics Magazine, a refereed bimonthly publication of the Mathematical Association of America.
- 1983: Julia Robinson became the first female president of the American Mathematical Society, and the first female mathematician to be awarded a MacArthur Fellowship.
- 1987: Eileen Poiani became the first female president of Pi Mu Epsilon.
- 1988: Doris Schattschneider became the first woman to present the Mathematical Association of America’s J. Sutherland Frame Lectures.

==== 1990s ====
- 1992: Gloria Gilmer became the first woman to deliver a major National Association of Mathematicians lecture (it was the Cox-Talbot address).
- 1995: Margaret Wright became the first female president of the Society for Industrial and Applied Mathematics.
- 1996: Joan Birman became the first woman to receive the Mathematical Association of America’s Chauvenet Prize, an annual award for expository articles.
- 1998: Melanie Wood became the first female American to make the U.S. International Math Olympiad Team. She won silver medals in the 1998 and 1999 International Mathematical Olympiads.

=== 21st Century ===
- 2002: Melanie Wood became the first American woman and second woman overall to be named a Putnam Fellow in 2002. Putnam Fellows are the top five (or six, in case of a tie) scorers on William Lowell Putnam Mathematical Competition.
- 2004:
  - Melanie Wood became the first woman to win the Frank and Brennie Morgan Prize for Outstanding Research in Mathematics by an Undergraduate Student. It is an annual award given to an undergraduate student in the US, Canada, or Mexico who demonstrates superior mathematics research.
  - Alison Miller became the first female gold medal winner on the U.S. International Mathematical Olympiad Team.
- 2006: Stefanie Petermichl, a German mathematical analyst then at the University of Texas at Austin, became the first woman to win the Salem Prize, an annual award given to young mathematicians who have worked in Raphael Salem's field of interest, chiefly topics in analysis related to Fourier series. She shared the prize with Artur Avila.
- 2019:
  - Karen Uhlenbeck became the first woman to win the Abel Prize, with the award committee citing "the fundamental impact of her work on analysis, geometry and mathematical physics."
  - Marissa Kawehi Loving became the first Native Hawaiian woman to earn a PhD in mathematics when she graduated from the University of Illinois Urbana-Champaign in 2019. In addition to being Native Hawaiian, she is also black, Japanese, and Puerto Rican.
- 2020:
  - Lisa Piccirillo published a mathematical proof in the journal Annals of Mathematics determining that the Conway knot is not a smoothly slice knot, answering an unsolved problem in knot theory first proposed over fifty years prior by English mathematician John Horton Conway.

== See also ==
Timeline of women in mathematics
