= Bodil Branner =

Danish mathematician

Bodil Branner (born 5 February 1943, in Aarhus) is a retired Danish mathematician, one of the founders of European Women in Mathematics and a former chair of the Danish Mathematical Society. Her research concerned holomorphic dynamics and the history of mathematics.

== Education and career ==
Branner studied mathematics and physics at Aarhus University, where mathematician Svend Bundgaard was one of her mentors, and in 1967 earned a master's degree (the highest degree then available) under the supervision of Leif Kristensen. She had intended to travel to the U.S. for a doctorate, but her husband, a chemist, took an industry job in Copenhagen. Branner could not get a job as a high school teacher because she did not have a teaching qualification, but Bundgaard found her a position as a faculty assistant for Frederik Fabricius-Bjerre at the Technical University of Denmark. Despite this not beginning as an actual faculty position, she eventually earned tenure there in the 1970s.

European Women in Mathematics was founded as an organization in 1986 by Branner, Caroline Series, Gudrun Kalmbach, Marie-Françoise Roy, and Dona Strauss, inspired by the activities of the Association for Women in Mathematics in the USA.

Branner was the first woman to lead the Danish Mathematical Society, which she did from 1998 to 2002.

She retired in 2008.

== Recognition ==
A symposium in honor of Branner's 60th birthday was held in Holbæk in 2003, and published as a festschrift in 2006. In 2012, she became one of the inaugural fellows of the American Mathematical Society.

== Selected publications ==
- Branner, Bodil; Hubbard, John H. (1988), "The iteration of cubic polynomials. I. The global topology of parameter space", Acta Mathematica, 160 (3–4): 143–206, doi:10.1007/BF02392275, MR 0945011.
- Branner, Bodil (1989), "The Mandelbrot set", Chaos and fractals (Providence, RI, 1988), Proc. Sympos. Appl. Math., vol. 39, Amer. Math. Soc., Providence, RI, pp. 75–105, doi:10.1090/psapm/039/1010237, ISBN 978-0-8218-0137-6, MR 1010237.
- Branner, Bodil; Hubbard, John H. (1992), "The iteration of cubic polynomials. II. Patterns and parapatterns", Acta Mathematica, 169 (3–4): 229–325, doi:10.1007/BF02392761, MR 1194004.
- Branner, Bodil; Johansen, Nils Voje (1999), "Caspar Wessel (1745–1818). Surveyor and mathematician", Matematisk-fysiske Meddelelser, 46 (1): 9–61, MR 1956505.
