= Dona Strauss =

South African mathematician

Dona Anschel Papert Strauss (born April 1934) is a South African mathematician working in topology and functional analysis. Her doctoral thesis was one of the initial sources of pointless topology. She has also been active in the political left, lost one of her faculty positions over her protests of the Vietnam War, and became a founder of European Women in Mathematics.

Mathematician Neil Hindman, with whom Strauss wrote a book on the Stone–Čech compactification of topological semigroups, has stated the following as advice for other mathematicians: "Find someone who is smarter than you are and get them to put your name on their papers", writing that for him, that someone was Dona Strauss.

== Education and career ==
Strauss is originally from South Africa, the descendant of Jewish immigrants from Eastern Europe. Her father was a physicist at the University of Cape Town. She grew up in the Eastern Cape, and earned a master's degree in mathematics at the University of Cape Town. She completed her Ph.D. at the University of Cambridge in 1958. Her dissertation, Lattices of Functions, Measures, and Open Sets, was supervised by Frank Smithies.

After completing her doctorate, she took a faculty position at the University of London. Following her husband's dream of living on a farm in Vermont, she moved to Dartmouth College in 1966. By 1972, she was working at the University of Hull and circa 2008 she became a professor at the University of Leeds. After retiring, she has been listed by Leeds as an honorary visiting fellow.

== Activism ==
In South Africa, Strauss developed a strong antipathy to racial discrimination from a combination of being a Jew at the time of the Holocaust and her own observations of South African society. At the University of Cape Town, she became a member of the Non-European Unity Movement. After completing her degree, she left the country in protest over apartheid; her parents also left South Africa, after her father's retirement, for Israel. In the 1950s, she regularly published editorial works in Socialist Review, and in the 1960s she was active in Solidarity (UK).

As an assistant professor at Dartmouth College in 1969, Strauss took part in a student anti-war protest that occupied Parkhurst Hall, the building that housed the college administration. In response, Dartmouth announced that Strauss and another faculty protester would not have their contracts renewed, and that they would be suspended from the faculty and "denied all rights and privileges of membership on the Dartmouth faculty", the first time in the college's history that it had taken this step.

In 1986, Strauss became one of the five founders of European Women in Mathematics, together with Bodil Branner, Caroline Series, Gudrun Kalmbach, and Marie-Françoise Roy.

== Books ==
Strauss is the co-author of:

- Algebra in the Stone-Čech compactification: Theory and applications (with Neil Hindman, De Gruyter Expositions in Mathematics 27, Walter de Gruyter & Co., 1998; 2nd ed., 2012)
- Banach algebras on semigroups and on their compactifications (with H. Garth Dales and Anthony T.-M. Lau, Memoirs of the American Mathematical Society 205, 2010)
- Banach spaces of continuous functions as dual spaces (with H. Garth Dales, Frederick K. Dashiell Jr., and Anthony T.-M. Lau, CMS Books in Mathematics, Springer, 2016)

== Recognition ==
In 2009 the University of Cambridge hosted a meeting, "Algebra and Analysis around the Stone-Cech Compactification", in honour of Strauss's 75th birthday.

== Personal life ==
Strauss married (as the first of his four wives) Seymour Papert. Papert was also South African, and became a co-author and fellow student of Frank Smithies with Strauss at Cambridge. She met her second husband, Edmond Strauss, at the University of London.

She is a strong amateur chess player, and was director of the Brighton and Hove Progressive Synagogue for 2014–2015.
