= European Women in Mathematics =

Professional organization

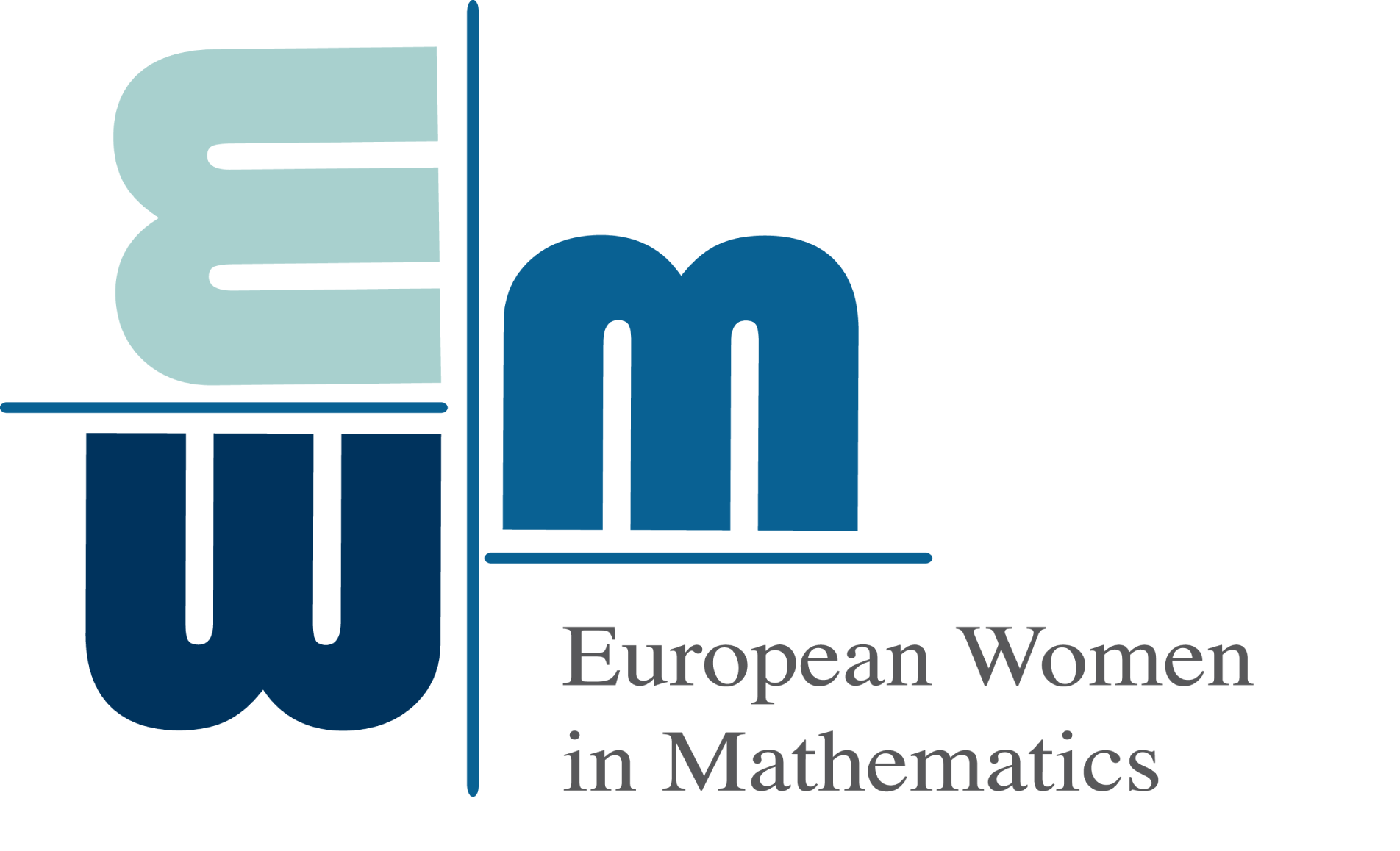
- Formation: 1986
- Type: Professional organization
- Members: 500
- Convenor: Andrea Walther
- Website: europeanwomeninmaths.org

European Women in Mathematics (EWM) is an international association of women working in the field of mathematics in Europe. The association participates in political and strategic work to promote the role of women in mathematics and offers its members direct support. Its goals include encouraging women to study mathematics and providing visibility to women mathematicians. It is the "first and best known" of several organizations devoted to women in mathematics in Europe.

== Mission ==
European Women in Mathematics aims to encourage women to study mathematics, support women in their careers, provide a meeting place for like-minded people and highlight and make women mathematicians visible. In this way, and by promoting scientific communication and working with groups and organisations with similar goals, they spread their vision of mathematics and science.

=== Mentorship ===
EWM has a mentoring programme which can be joined at any time of the year. EWM brings together a younger and a more experienced member to share different experiences and perspectives for motivation and inspiration.

=== Grants ===
EWM awards travel grants for female mathematicians every year. The travel grants are awarded to EWM members who are at an early stage of their career or work in a developing country and who need financial resources (travel and/or accommodation, up to 400 EUR) to attend and speak at an important conference in their field of expertise.

== Regular Activities ==
Every other year, EWM holds a general meeting and a summer school. A newsletter is published at least twice a year, EWM has a website, a Facebook group and an e-mail network. EWM coordinates a mentoring programme and awards a travel grant twice a year.

=== General Meetings ===
EWM hold a General Meeting every other year in the form of a week-long conference with a scientific program of mini-courses on mathematical topics, discussions on the situation of women in the field and a General Assembly.

General meetings have been held in Paris (1986), Copenhagen (1987), Warwick (1988), Lisbon (1990), Marseilles (1991), Warsaw (1993), Madrid (1995), Trieste ICTP (1997), Hannover (1999), Malta (2001), Luminy (2003), Volgograd (2005), Cambridge (2007), Novi Sad (2009), Barcelona (2011), Bonn (2013), Cortona (2015), and Graz (2018).

=== Activities at international conferences ===
EWM holds satellite conferences to the European Congress in Mathematics and takes part in ICWM International Conference of Women in Mathematics, International Congress of Women Mathematicians and now World Meeting for Women Mathematicians.

== History ==
Although the group that became EWM began holding informal meetings as early as 1974, EWM was founded as an organization in 1986 by Bodil Branner, Caroline Series, Gudrun Kalmbach, Marie-Françoise Roy, and Dona Strauss, inspired by the activities of the Association for Women in Mathematics in the USA. It was established as an association under Finnish law in 1993 with its seat in Helsinki. In fact, the basic structure defining the convenor, standing committee and coordinators was established between 1987 and 1991. An EWM email net was set up in 1994 followed by a web page in 1997.

The organization has a Scientific Committee, jointly with the European Mathematical Society and its Committee on Women in Mathematics.

== Convenors and Deputies ==
List of elected convenors and deputy convenors of the standing committee of EWM
period	convenor	deputy convenor	deputy convenor
1993–1994	Anna Romanowska (Poland)		
1996–1997	Sylvie Paycha (France)	Capi Corrales (Spain)	
1998–1999	Laura Fainsilber (Sweden)	Irene Sciriha (Malta)	Inna Yemelyanova
2000–2001	Irene Sciriha (Malta)	Christine Bessenrodt (Germany)	Laura Fainsilber (Sweden)
2002–2003	Ljudmila Bordag (Germany)	Irene Sciriha (Malta)	Francine Diener (France)
2004–2005	Laura Tedeschini-Lalli (Italy)	Marjo Lipponen (Finland)	Marie Demlova (Czech Republic)
2006–2007	Marjo Lipponen (Finland)	Karma Dajani (Netherlands)	Laura Tedeschini-Lalli (Italy)
2008–2009	Frances Kirwan (UK)	Marjo Lipponen (Finland)	
2010–2011	Marie-Francoise Roy (France)	Frances Kirwan (UK)	
2012–2013	Marie-Francoise Roy (France)	Lisbeth Fajstrup (Denmark)	
2013–2016	Susanna Terracini (Italy)	Angela Pistoia (Italy)	
2016–2020	Carola-Bibiane Schönlieb (Austria/UK)	Elena Resmerita (Austria)	
2020–2022	Andrea Walther (Germany)	Kaie Kubjas (Finland)	

== Similar Societies ==
There are many similar societies like the "European Women in Mathematics" society that celebrate women in Mathematics. For instance:

=== Women in Mathematics ===
- International Mathematical Union (IMU) Committee for Women in Mathematics
- EMS Women in Mathematics Committee
- EMS/EWM Scientific Committee
- Femmes et mathématiques
- EWM - The Netherlands
- LMS Women in Mathematics Committee
- Korea Women in Mathematical Sciences
- AWM, Association for Women in Mathematics
- Polish Woman in Mathematics
- Women in Math Project
- AWSE Association of Women in Science and Education in Russian

=== Mathematics ===
- The European Mathematical Information Service (EMIS)
- The International Mathematical Union (IMU)
- Math Archives WWW server

=== European Union Information ===
- EMS, European Mathematical Society
