= Irene Sciriha =

Maltese mathematician

Professor Irene Sciriha Aquilina
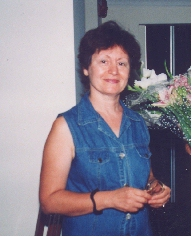
- Born: Valletta, Malta
- Education: Royal University of Malta (BSc); University of Reading (PhD)
- Scientific career
- Fields: Mathematics
- Workplaces: University of Malta
- Thesis: On some aspects of graph spectra (1998)
- Doctoral advisors: Anthony Hilton; Stanley Fiorini

Irene Sciriha Aquilina is a Maltese mathematician specializing in spectral graph theory and chemical graph theory. A particular topic of her research has been the singular graphs, graphs whose adjacency matrix is a singular matrix, and the nut graphs, singular graphs all of whose nontrivial induced subgraphs are non-singular. She is a professor of mathematics at the University of Malta. She is a Fellow of the Institute of Combinatorics and its Applications.

== Education and career ==
Sciriha studied mathematics at the University of Malta, earning bachelor's and master's degrees as the only woman studying mathematics or physics there at that time. She completed a PhD in 1998 at the University of Reading in England. Her dissertation, On some aspects of graph spectra, was jointly supervised by Anthony Hilton and Stanley Fiorini, and she also worked with Nash Williams, David Stirling and Peter Rowlinson.

Sciriha specializes in spectral graph theory and chemical graph theory. A particular topic of her research has been the singular graphs, graphs whose adjacency matrix is a singular matrix, and the nut graphs, singular graphs all of whose nontrivial induced subgraphs are non-singular.

She began teaching at the University of Malta in 1971, and is a professor of mathematics there. She was convenor of European Women in Mathematics from 2000 to 2001. She was also a representative for Malta on the Helsinki Group of the European Commission.

== Recognition ==
Sciriha is a Fellow of the Institute of Combinatorics and its Applications. One of her students, chemist Martha Borg, won the Turner Prize at the University of Sheffield for a doctoral dissertation co-advised by Sciriha and Patrick W. Fowler.
