= M. C. Escher: Visions of Symmetry =

Book by mathematician Doris Schattschneider published in 1990

- Front cover of the 1990 first edition
- Author: Doris Schattschneider
- Language: English
- Subject: M. C. Escher, symmetry, tessellation
- Publisher: W. H. Freeman and Company
- Publication date: 1990
- Publication place: U.S.A.
- Media type: Print
- Pages: 354
- Dewey Decimal: 760.092
- LC Class: NC263.E83A4
- Text: M. C. Escher: Visions of Symmetry at Internet Archive

M. C. Escher: Visions of Symmetry is a book by mathematician Doris Schattschneider published by W. H. Freeman in 1990. The book analyzes the symmetry of M. C. Escher's colored periodic drawings and explains the methods he used to construct his artworks. Escher made extensive use of two-color and multi-color symmetry in his periodic drawings. The book contains more than 350 illustrations, half of which were never previously published.

== Structure and topics ==
The book is divided into five chapters. Before the main text there is a foreword and a preface, and the book is concluded with a concordance, afterword (in the second edition only), bibliography and four indexes.

The first chapter, 'The Route to Regular Division', describes Escher's early artistic development, and how Escher first became intrigued by the problem of filling the plane with interlocking shapes (tessellation). This work came to dominate his art from 1937. He was also encouraged, by a half-brother who was a professor of geology, to study papers on symmetry by Pólya and other mathematicians in the Zeitschrift für Kristallographie. These helped launch Escher into his own detailed investigations of the rules for generating the allowable patterns for tiling the plane.

The second chapter 'The 1941–1942 Notebooks' presents, for the first time, the complete set of numbered drawings from the two 1941–1942 notebooks which summarize Escher's theory of the regular divisions of the plane, and details the classification system Escher used to organize his drawings.

The third chapter 'The Regular Division Drawings' is the longest in the book at 118 pages. It reproduces all of the known drawings (numbers 1 to 137) and the known periodic designs (A1 to A14) from Escher's 1938–1941 notebooks together with his notes on their symmetry type.

The fourth chapter 'The Use of Regular Division' explains that Escher regarded his periodic drawings as a means to an end rather than as finished works of art in their own right. The periodic drawings were the solutions to the question of what was possible when tiling the plane using the rules that Escher had established. Escher used the periodic drawings as a basis for developing his completed artworks.

The fifth chapter 'Notes on the drawings' provides additional information of each of the drawings in chapter 3. For each drawing the following information is given: number, title, place drawn, medium, dimensions, Escher system type, symmetry group, previous publication, and notes.

The book concludes with a concordance which gives a complete tabulation of the symmetry groups represented by Escher's periodic drawings and an afterword, in the second edition only, which outlines the developments in the subject between 1990 and 2004.

== Audience ==
In her preface, the author's stated objective for the book is to answer the question "How did he do it?". The audience for the book is any person who admires, or is interested in, M. C. Escher's periodic drawings and would like to understand his methods for designing and executing his artworks. As no prior mathematical knowledge is assumed by the author to understand the material presented in the book, it is appropriate for a general audience. As Michele Emmer comments in his review: "It is important that, with this beautiful volume, artists and scientists can look at Escher's original notebooks."

== Reception ==
The book was widely reviewed and its reception was very positive. Alan L. Mackay in a full-page review for Nature wrote: "This book contains very many colour reproductions of the periodic drawings and analyses the 1941–42 notebooks which show Escher's development [...] Taking Doris Schattschneider's beautiful volume with earlier books, especially that by Bruno Ernst, documentation of Escher's life, intellectual development and corpus must now be almost complete." Roger Goodwin writing in The British Journal of Aesthetics said "This book, the product of more than fifteen years of research by its mathematician author, provides the definitive account of how Escher produced his renowned interlocking drawings, based on the regular division of the plane." Michele Emmer reviewing the book in Leonardo wrote: "Escher's theory, recorded in the notebooks of 1941–1942, has never been completely published before. All the 150 color drawings of interlocking patterns that he produced from 1937 to 1941 are reproduced in the book. It is, of course, the most essential part of the volume." Marjorie Senechal wrote the entry for Mathematical Reviews: "The development of Escher's ideas is carefully traced, the influence of his work on others, and vice versa, is discussed, and all of the notebook drawings are presented in full color. Doris Schattschneider has written the Escher book for mathematicians."

John Galloway reviewing the book for New Scientist said: "Many books have been written about Escher's art. None has approached Visions of Symmetry for its scope, scale and sumptuousness. The sheer beauty and ingenuity of the pictures keep you turning the pages as though the book were a collection of detective stories whose plots are brilliantly organised patterns." In an extensive review in The American Mathematical Monthly Douglas Dunham said: "For the Escher fan, Visions of Symmetry fills a gap in the literature by showing all of his notebook patterns, answering the question "how did he do it?", and relating the patterns to his prints. For the person interested in tilings and patterns, Visions of Symmetry provides many beautiful examples (which illustrate the theory expounded in Grünbaum and Shepard's Tilings and patterns [1987])." J. Kevin Colligan reviewing the book for The Mathematics Teacher wrote: "This book sits on the boundary between mathematics and art, as did Escher. In fact, this book supports the argument that no such boundary exists; rather, the two disciplines coexist and intermingle, enriching both." Paul Garcia writing in The Mathematical Gazette writes: "I recommend the book highly to anyone - the price is small compared to the scope and interest of the work. Doris Schattschneider has done us all a tremendous favour by compiling this book."

== Influence ==
David Topper writing of the second edition in Choice said "This beautiful book remains one of the essential studies of this most popular artist." Gerald L. Alexanderson writing in MAA Reviews said "It's an impressive piece of scholarship that is extraordinarily beautiful as well. This book is an old friend and it's good to welcome it back in such an elegant and sumptuous form." Laurence Goldstein reviewing the second edition in Print Quarterly said: "... the reader is enabled to glimpse the process through which the artist struggled towards the finished works of art that Hofstadter (and, of course, many others) find so sensuously gratifying. There is also a wealth of biographical information concerning the mathematical and artistic influences on Escher's work, and on the creative process as witnessed by people close to him and as perceived by the artist himself." A brief, unsigned review in Science said: "Escher's periodic tilings have made the artist a favorite of mathematicians and scientists. In her classic 1990 book, Schattschneider analyzed his art and notebooks to explain how Escher created his colorful, puzzle-like regular divisions of the plane [...] This new edition adds a short survey of reflections of his work in mathematics, computer graphics, the Internet, and contemporary art." An unsigned review in the Epsilon Pi Tau Journal of Technology Studies said: "A revision of a classic book that appeared in 1990, this is the most penetrating study of Escher's work in existence and the one most admired by scientists and mathematicians. It deals with one powerful obsession that preoccupied Escher: what he called the 'regular division of the plane', the puzzle-like interlocking of birds, fish, lizards, and other natural forms in continuous patterns. Schattschneider explores how he succeeded at this task by meticulously analyzing his notebooks."

== Editions ==
- First edition entitled Visions of Symmetry: Notebooks, Periodic Drawings, and Related Work of M. C. Escher published by W.H. Freeman in 1990.
- Second, revised edition entitled M. C. Escher: Visions of Symmetry: Notebooks, Periodic Drawings, and Related Work published by Harry N. Abrams in 2004.
