= Anna Romanowska =

Polish mathematician

Anna B. Romanowska is a Polish mathematician specializing in abstract algebra. She is professor emeritus of algebra and combinatorics at the Warsaw University of Technology, and was the first convenor of European Women in Mathematics.

== Education and career ==
Romanowska earned her Ph.D. in 1973 at the Warsaw University of Technology. Her dissertation, Toward an Algebraic Study of the Tone System, was supervised by Tadeusz Traczyk. She became the first convenor of European Women in Mathematics, for 1993–1994.

== Books ==
Romanowska is the coauthor of three books on abstract algebra with Jonathan D. H. Smith:

- Modal theory: an algebraic approach to order, geometry, and convexity (Heldermann, 1985)
- Post-modern algebra (Wiley, 1999)
- Modes (World Scientific, 2002)
