= Andrea Walther =

German mathematician

Andrea Walther (born 1970 in Bremerhaven) is a German applied mathematician and professor of mathematical optimization in the department for mathematics of Humboldt University of Berlin.

== Biography ==
After completing an apprenticeship as a bank clerk at Deutsche Bank in Bremerhaven from 1989 to 1991, she studied business mathematics at the University of Bayreuth, where she received her diploma in 1996.

Subsequently, Walther joined the DFG research group "Identification and Optimization of Complex Models Based on Analytical Sensitivities" at the TU Dresden as a research associate in analysis from 1997 to 1999. She earned her PhD in mathematics from TU Dresden in 1999. Her dissertation, Program Reversal Schedules for Single-and Multi-processor Machines, was supervised by Andreas Griewank. From 2000 to 2002, she worked at the TU Dresden as a scientific assistant at the Institute of Mathematics.

Between 2003 and 2006, she led an independent junior research group on the analysis and optimization of computational models at TU Dresden. She was appointed Junior Professor in the same field at TU Dresden from 2007 to 2008. In 2007, she also served as a substitute professor ("Mathematics I") at the University of Regensburg. She completed her habilitation at TU Dresden in 2008.

From 2009 to 2019, Walther was Professor of Mathematics and its Applications at the University of Paderborn. Since 2019, she has been a MATH+ Professor of Mathematical Optimization in the department for mathematics at the Humboldt-Universität zu Berlin 2008.

From 2020 to 2022 Walther was convenor of the European Women in Mathematics.

Since 2024, she has served as chair for the executive board of the Cluster of Excellence MATH+. In the same year, she was appointed acting Vice President of the Zuse Institute Berlin.

== Research ==
Walther's research focuses on nonlinear programming, nonsmooth optimization, scientific computing, and algorithmic differentiation (also known as automatic differentiation).

== Recognition ==
Walther was elected as a Fellow of the Society for Industrial and Applied Mathematics, in the 2025 Class of SIAM Fellows, "for contributions in algorithmic optimization and automatic differentiation". She gave an invited lecture at the 2023 SIAM Conference on Optimization in Seattle, USA.

== Publications ==
Walther has co-authored one book, three proceedings and over 100 research papers.

With Andreas Griewank, Walther published the text book Evaluating derivatives: principles and techniques of algorithmic differentiation (Society for Industrial and Applied Mathematics, 2008) on the theoretical foundation of Algorithmic Differentiation.
