= Formation (group theory) =

In group theory, a branch of mathematics, a formation is a class of groups closed under taking images and such that if G/M and G/N are in the formation then so is G/M∩N. Gaschütz (1962) introduced formations to unify the theory of Hall subgroups and Carter subgroups of finite solvable groups.

Some examples of formations are the formation of p-groups for a prime p, the formation of π-groups for a set of primes π, and the formation of nilpotent groups.

== Special cases ==
A Melnikov formation is closed under taking quotients, normal subgroups and group extensions. Thus a Melnikov formation M has the property that for every short exact sequence

$$1 \rightarrow A \rightarrow B \rightarrow C \rightarrow 1\$$

A and C are in M if and only if B is in M.

A full formation is a Melnikov formation which is also closed under taking subgroups.

An almost full formation is one which is closed under quotients, direct products and subgroups, but not necessarily extensions. The families of finite abelian groups and finite nilpotent groups are almost full, but neither full nor Melnikov.

== Schunck classes ==
A Schunck class, introduced by Schunck (1967), is a generalization of a formation, consisting of a class of groups such that a group is in the class if and only if every primitive factor group is in the class. Here a group is called primitive if it has a self-centralizing normal abelian subgroup.
