= Marissa Loving =

Indigenous mathematician

Marissa Kawehi Loving
- Born: O'ahu, Hawaiʻi, U.S.

Academic background
- Education: University of Hawaiʻi (B.S., B.A.); University of Illinois at Urbana-Champaign (PhD)
- Thesis: Least dilatation of pure surface braids (2019)
- Doctoral advisor: Chris Leininger

Academic work
- Discipline: Theoretical mathematician
- Institutions: Georgia Tech; University of Wisconsin-Madison

Marissa Kawehi Loving is an American theoretical mathematician. In 2022, she joined the University of Wisconsin-Madison as the Assistant Professor of Mathematics. Loving, who is both native Hawaiʻian and Black, was the first woman faculty member from a historically excluded racial group in mathematics to receive tenure-track in the department. She was recognised as one of the 2023 Black Mathematician Honorees by Mathematically Gifted and Black.

Loving's research interests include geometric group theory, low-dimensional topology and mapping class groups of finite and infinite surfaces.

== Early life and education ==
Loving was born in O'ahu, Hawaiʻi and raised in Honomū. In addition to being a Native Hawaiʻian, she is also Black, Puerto Rican, and Japanese. Her mother Theresa Loving (née Prowell) was from Pennsylvania and her father, Floyd Carleton Loving lll, was a middle-school mathematics teacher from O'ahu. Loving is the eldest of 11 siblings. She was homeschooled, and was more interested in pursuing writing, instead of STEM, as a career. She wanted to be a journalist or a playwright, but decided to study computer science at the University of Hawaiʻi at Hilo, where she was a presidential scholar.

Loving graduated from the University of Hawaiʻi in 2013 with a Bachelor of Science in computer science and a Bachelor of Arts in mathematics. She earned a doctorate degree in mathematics from University of Illinois at Urbana-Champaign in 2019, during which she received the NSF Graduate Research Fellowship and an Illinois Graduate College Distinguished Fellowship. She was the first Native Hawaiian woman to earn a PhD in mathematics. For the next three years, she was NSF Postdoctoral Research Fellow and Hale Assistant Professor at Georgia Tech. In 2022, she joined University of Wisconsin-Madison as an Assistant Professor on a tenure-track position and earned the Nellie Y. McKay Fellowship. Loving is the first woman from a historically excluded racial group in mathematics to be appointed as a tenure-track faculty member in the department.

== Research ==
Loving' contributions in the field of low-dimensional topology focus on end-periodic mapping tori (sing. torus) to understand the hyperbolic volumes and geometric invariants that inform broader manifold classification. In particular, she links surface dynamics to 3-dimensional hyperbolic geometry by establishing the bounds on volumes for the tori. Building on the work of Ian Agol and Jeffrey Brock on hyperbolic 3-manifolds in the finite-type setting, Loving worked with Elizabeth Field, Heejoung Kim, and Chris Leininger to construct and subsequently use "a broad class of examples of irreducible, end-periodic homeomorphisms" to show an asymptotically sharp bound. She, alongside Field, Autumn Kent, and Leininger, devised "a framework to prove volume estimates for closed hyperbolic 3-manifolds with depth-one foliations."

Loving's work also involves big mapping class groups, in particular those arising from infinite-type surfaces. Using geometric group theory techniques, she and Justin Lanier demonstrated that subgroup structures of infinite-type surfaces have trivial centers and that every non-trivial normal subgroup contains a non-abelian free group.

== Other engagements ==
In 2019, Loving and fellow mathematician Justin Lanier founded SUBgroups, a network of online support groups, to help first-year math graduate students to connect with their peers in order to share their experiences, uplift each other, and find a mathematical community beyond their academic program. She also cofounded paraDIGMS (Diversity in Graduate Mathematical Sciences) to provide resources, support, and collaboration opportunities to a professional community of graduate directors, graduate committee members, department chairs, and faculty. She coordinates the activities for paraDIGMS alongside Lanier, Matthew Ando (University of Illinois Urbana-Champaign) and Bianca Viray (University of Washington).

Loving serves on the Pacific Institute for the Mathematical Sciences' Indigenous Engagement Committee, which supports Indigenous-led efforts in education and research in the mathematical sciences. She is the cofounder of Indigenous Mathematicians, a web platform that recognizes indigenous people in mathematics.

== Publications ==
=== Journal articles ===
- Aougab, Tarik; Lahn, Max; Loving, Marissa; Miller, Nicholas (2025-05-01). "Unmarked simple length spectral rigidity for covers". Mathematische Annalen. 392 (1): 861–898. arXiv:2210.16706. doi:10.1007/s00208-025-03103-y. ISSN 1432-1807.
- Field, Elizabeth; Kent, Autumn; Leininger, Christopher; Loving, Marissa (2025). "A lower bound on volumes of end-periodic mapping tori". Journal of Topology. 18 (3) e70037. arXiv:2306.03279. doi:10.1112/topo.70037. ISSN 1753-8424.
- Field, Elizabeth; Kim, Heejoung; Leininger, Christopher; Loving, Marissa (2023). "End-periodic homeomorphisms and volumes of mapping tori". Journal of Topology. 16 (1): 57–105. arXiv:2106.15642. doi:10.1112/topo.12277. ISSN 1753-8416.
- Aougab, Tarik; Lahn, Max; Loving, Marissa; Xiao, Yang (2023). "Characterizing covers via simple closed curves". Geometriae Dedicata. 217 (2): 26. arXiv:2006.16988. doi:10.1007/s10711-022-00760-0. ISSN 1572-9168.
- Garcia, Rebecca E.; Harris, Pamela E.; Loving, Marissa; Martinez, Lucy; Melendez, David; Rennie, Joseph; Rojas Kirby, Gordon; Tinoco, Daniel (2022). "On Kostant's weight q-multiplicity formula for [Math Processing Error]". Applicable Algebra in Engineering, Communication and Computing. 33 (4): 353–418. arXiv:2001.01270. doi:10.1007/s00200-020-00454-8. ISSN 0938-1279.
- Agrawal, Shuchi; Aougab, Tarik; Chandran, Yassin; Loving, Marissa; Oakley, J. Robert; Shapiro, Roberta; Xiao, Yang (2023). "Automorphisms of the k-Curve Graph". Michigan Mathematical Journal. 73 (2). arXiv:1912.07666. doi:10.1307/mmj/20205929. ISSN 0026-2285.
- Loving, Marissa (2019-03-12). "Least dilatation of pure surface braids". Algebraic & Geometric Topology. 19 (2): 941–964. arXiv:1801.10564. doi:10.2140/agt.2019.19.941. ISSN 1472-2739.
