= Christine Bessenrodt =

German mathematician (1958–2022)

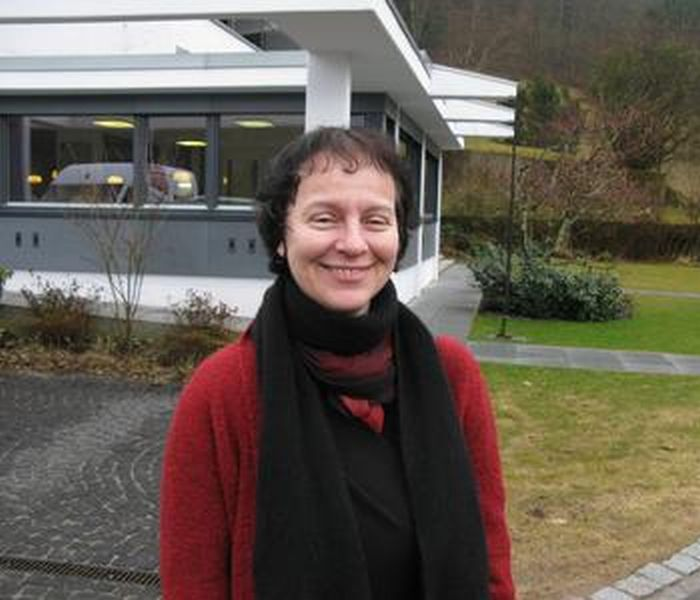
Bessenrodt at the Oberwolfach Research Institute for Mathematics, 2009

Christine Bessenrodt (1958–2022) was a German mathematician who was for many years the Chair of Algebra and Number Theory at Leibniz University Hannover. Her research involved representation theory, algebraic combinatorics, and additive number theory. She was also known for her advocacy of women in mathematics, including founding the Emmy Noether Lecture program of the German Mathematical Society.

== Early life and education ==
Bessenrodt was born on 18 March 1958, in Ahlten, the daughter of two physicists. After undergraduate study in mathematics at Heinrich Heine University Düsseldorf, and graduate study at the University of Essen (now part of the University of Duisburg-Essen), she earned a doctorate in 1980. Her dissertation, Unzerlegbare Gitter in Blöcken mit zyklischen Defektgruppen [Indecomposable lattices in blocks with cyclic defect groups], concerned the representation theory of finite groups, and was supervised by Gerhard O. Michler.

== Career and later life ==
From 1980 to 1993, Bessenrodt did postdoctoral research at the University of Essen, University of Duisburg, and University of Illinois Urbana–Champaign, supported in part by a Heisenberg grant. In 1993 she obtained a professorship in algebra at Otto von Guericke University Magdeburg, in East Germany, soon after the German reunion. The following year she became vice dean of the faculty of mathematics.

She moved to Leibniz University Hannover in 2002, taking the Chair of Algebra and Number Theory there. She remained in Hannover for the rest of her career, later becoming director of the newly formed Institut für Algebra, Zahlentheorie und Diskrete Mathematik.

She died on 25 January 2022.

== Recognition ==
A colloquium and conference in memory of Bessenrodt was held at Leibniz University Hannover in July 2022.
