= Danish Mathematical Society =

The Danish Mathematical Society (Dansk Matematisk Forening) is a society of Danish mathematicians founded in 1873 at the University of Copenhagen, a year after the French Mathematical Society. According to the society website, it has "the purpose of acting for the benefit of mathematics in research and education."

== History ==
The society was founded after the idea of Thorvald N. Thiele. The first committee was composed of Thiele, Hieronymus Georg Zeuthen and Julius Petersen.

Bodil Branner was the first woman to lead the Danish Mathematical Society, which she did from 1998 to 2002.

=== Presidents ===
- Johan Jensen (1892–1903)
- Vilhelm Herman Oluf Madsen (1903–1910)
- Niels Nielsen (1910–1917)
- Johannes Mollerup (1917–1926)
- Harald Bohr (1926–1929, 1937–1951)
- Børge Jessen (1954–1958)
- Werner Fenchel (1958–1962)
- Bodil Branner (1998–2002)

== See also ==
- List of Mathematical Societies
