= Class of groups =

Collection of groups

A class of groups is a set-theoretical collection of groups satisfying the property that if G is in the collection then every group isomorphic to G is also in the collection. This concept arose from the necessity to work with a bunch of groups satisfying certain special property (for example finiteness or commutativity). Since set theory does not admit the "set of all groups", it is necessary to work with the more general concept of class.

== Definition ==
A class of groups $\mathfrak{X}$ is a collection of groups such that if $G \in \mathfrak{X}$ and $G\cong H$ then $H \in \mathfrak{X}$. Groups in the class $\mathfrak{X}~$ are referred to as $\mathfrak{X}$-groups.

For a set of groups $\mathfrak{I}$, we denote by $(\mathfrak{I})$ the smallest class of groups containing $\mathfrak{I}$. In particular for a group $G$, $(G)$ denotes its isomorphism class.

== Examples ==
The most common examples of classes of groups are:

- $\emptyset$: the empty class of groups
- $\mathfrak{C}~$: the class of cyclic groups
- $\mathfrak{A}~$: the class of abelian groups
- $\mathfrak{U}~$: the class of finite supersolvable groups
- $\mathfrak{N}~$: the class of nilpotent groups
- $\mathfrak{S}~$: the class of finite solvable groups
- $\mathfrak{I}~$: the class of finite simple groups
- $\mathfrak{F}~$: the class of finite groups
- $\mathfrak{G}~$: the class of all groups

== Product of classes of groups ==
Given two classes of groups $\mathfrak{X}$ and $\mathfrak{Y}$ it is defined the product of classes

$$\mathfrak{X}\mathfrak{Y} = (G \mid G \text{ has a normal subgroup } N \in \mathfrak{X} \text{ with } G/N \in \mathfrak{Y}).$$

This construction allows us to recursively define the power of a class by setting

$\mathfrak{X}^0 = (1)$ and $\mathfrak{X}^n = \mathfrak{X}^{n-1}\mathfrak{X}.$

It must be remarked that this binary operation on the class of classes of groups is neither associative nor commutative. For instance, consider the alternating group of degree 4 (and order 12); this group belongs to the class $(\mathfrak{C}\mathfrak{C})\mathfrak{C}$ because it has as a subgroup the group $V_4$, which belongs to $\mathfrak{C}\mathfrak{C}$, and furthermore $A_4/V_4\cong C_3$, which is in $\mathfrak{C}$. However $A_4$ has no non-trivial normal cyclic subgroup, so $A_4\not\in\mathfrak{C}(\mathfrak{C}\mathfrak{C})$. Then $\mathfrak{C}(\mathfrak{C}\mathfrak{C})\not=(\mathfrak{C}\mathfrak{C})\mathfrak{C}$.

However it is straightforward from the definition that for any three classes of groups $\mathfrak{X}$, $\mathfrak{Y}$, and $\mathfrak{Z}$,

$$\mathfrak{X}(\mathfrak{Y}\mathfrak{Z})\subseteq(\mathfrak{X}\mathfrak{Y})\mathfrak{Z}$$

== Class maps and closure operations ==
A class map c is a map which assigns a class of groups $\mathfrak{X}$ to another class of groups $c\mathfrak{X}$. A class map is said to be a closure operation if it satisfies the next properties:

1. c is expansive: $\mathfrak{X}\subseteq c\mathfrak{X}$
2. c is idempotent: $c\mathfrak{X}=c(c\mathfrak{X})$
3. c is monotonic: If $\mathfrak{X}\subseteq\mathfrak{Y}$ then $c\mathfrak{X}\subseteq c\mathfrak{Y}$

Some of the most common examples of closure operations are:

- $S\mathfrak{X} = (G \mid G\leq H, \ H\in\mathfrak{X})$
- $Q\mathfrak{X} = (G \mid \text{exists }H\in\mathfrak{X} \text{ and an epimorphism from } H \text{ to } G)$
- $N_0\mathfrak{X} = (G \mid \text{ exists }K_i\ (i=1,\cdots,r)\text{ subnormal in }G\text{ with }K_i \in \mathfrak{X}\text{ and }G = \langle K_1,\cdots,K_r\rangle)$
- $R_0\mathfrak{X} = (G \mid \text{ exists }N_i\ (i=1,\cdots,r)\text{ normal in }G\text{ with }G/N_i \in \mathfrak{X}\text{ and }\bigcap\limits_{i=1}^rNi=1)$
- $S_n\mathfrak{X} = (G \mid G\text{ is subnormal in } H \text{ for some } H \in \mathfrak{X})$

== See also ==
- Formation
