= Mary L. Boas =

American mathematician and physics professor

- Born: March 10, 1917; Prosser, Washington
- Died: February 17, 2010 (aged 92); Seattle, Washington
- Education: University of Washington; Massachusetts Institute of Technology
- Occupations: Mathematician and physicist
- Employer: DePaul University
- Known for: Author of Mathematical Methods in the Physical Sciences
- Spouse: Ralph P. Boas, Jr.
- Children: Harold P. Boas

Mary Layne Boas (March 10, 1917 – February 17, 2010) was an American mathematician and physics professor best known as the author of Mathematical Methods in the Physical Sciences (1966), an undergraduate textbook that was still widely used in college classrooms as of 1999.

== Education and career ==
She received a bachelor's degree (1938) and a master's degree (1940) in mathematics at the University of Washington, and a Ph.D. (1948) in physics at the Massachusetts Institute of Technology. She taught physics at DePaul University in Chicago for thirty years, retiring in 1987 to return to Washington. Prior to her time at DePaul University, she served as an instructor in the mathematics department at Duke University.

== Contributions ==
In 2005, at the age of 88, Boas published the third edition of her textbook. She established the Mary L. Boas Endowed Scholarship at the University of Washington in 2008 to recognize outstanding academic achievements by female students in physics.

== Personal life ==
Mary Boas was married to mathematician Ralph P. Boas Jr. Her son, Harold P. Boas, is also a noted mathematician. She died on February 17, 2010, at her home near Seattle, Washington.
