= Melanie Wood =

American mathematician (born 1981)

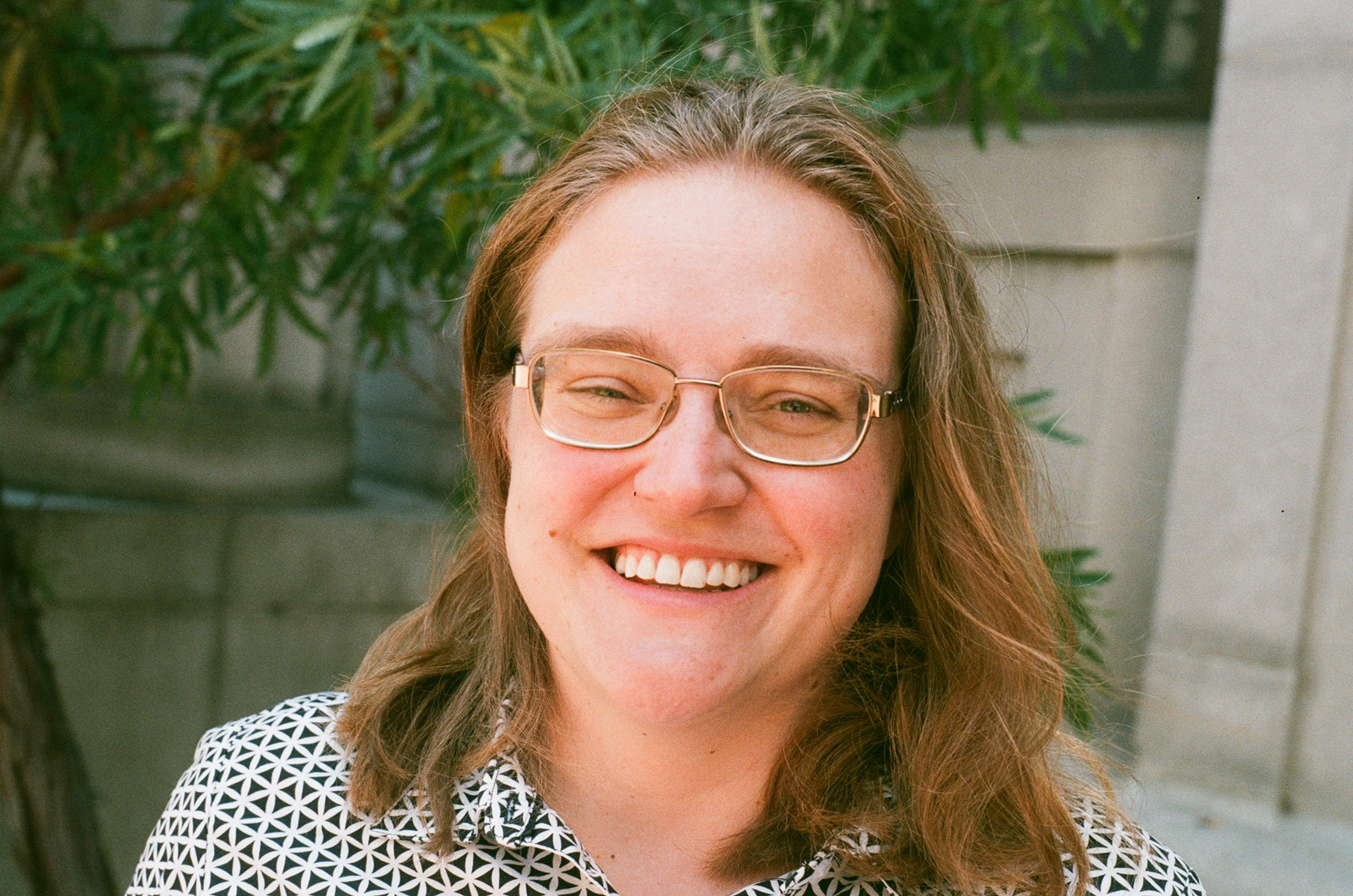
- Wood in 2019
- Born: 1981 (age 44–45); Indianapolis, Indiana
- Education: Duke University; Trinity College, Cambridge; Princeton University
- Awards: Morgan Prize (2004) NSF CAREER Award (2017) AWM-Microsoft Research Prize in Algebra and Number Theory (2018)
- Scientific career
- Fields: Mathematics
- Workplaces: Stanford University; University of Wisconsin; University of California, Berkeley; Harvard University
- Thesis: Moduli spaces for rings and ideals (2009)
- Doctoral advisor: Manjul Bhargava

Melanie Matchett Wood (born 1981) is an American mathematician and Professor of Mathematics at Harvard University who was the first woman to qualify for the U.S. International Mathematical Olympiad Team. She completed her PhD in 2009 at Princeton University (under Manjul Bhargava). Previously, she was Chancellor's Professor of Mathematics at UC Berkeley, Vilas Distinguished Achievement Professor of Mathematics at the University of Wisconsin, and spent 2 years as Szegö Assistant Professor at Stanford University.

She is a number theorist; more specifically, her research centers on arithmetic statistics, with excursions into related questions in arithmetic geometry and probability theory.

== Early life ==
Wood was born in Indianapolis, Indiana, to Sherry Eggers and Archie Wood, both middle school teachers. Her father, who taught mathematics, died of cancer when Wood was six weeks old.

While a high school student at Park Tudor School in Indianapolis, Wood (then aged 16) became the first female American to make the U.S. International Mathematical Olympiad Team, receiving silver medals in the 1998 and 1999 International Mathematical Olympiad. Wood was also a cheerleader and student newspaper editor at her school.

== Awards ==
In 2002, she received the Alice T. Schafer Prize from the Association for Women in Mathematics.

In 2003, Wood graduated from Duke University where she won a Gates Cambridge Scholarship, Fulbright fellowship (declined to accept the Gates Cambridge Scholarship), and a National Science Foundation graduate fellowship, in addition to becoming the first American woman and second woman overall to be named a Putnam Fellow in 2002.

During the 2003–2004 school year, she studied at Cambridge University. She was also named the Deputy Leader of the U.S. team that finished second overall at the 2005 International Mathematical Olympiad.

In 2004, she won the Morgan Prize for work in two topics, Belyi-extending maps and P-orderings, making her the first woman to win this award.

In 2012, she became a fellow of the American Mathematical Society.

In 2017, she received an NSF CAREER Award.

In 2018, she received the AWM-Microsoft Research Prize in Algebra and Number Theory from the Association for Women in Mathematics.

From 2019 to 2021, Wood was an American Mathematical Society (AMS) Council member at large.

In 2021, she received the NSF Alan T. Waterman Award.

In 2022, she was awarded a MacArthur Fellowship.

In 2024, she was elected into the American academy of Arts and Sciences.

In 2025, she was awarded the PECASE.

In 2025, she was elected into the National Academy of Sciences.

== Selected publications ==
- Wood, Melanie (2019). "Nonabelian Cohen-Lenstra moments. With an appendix by the author and Philip Matchett Wood". Duke Math. J. 168, no. 3, 377–427. MR 3909900.
- Vakil, Ravi; Wood, Melanie (2015). "Discriminants in the Grothendieck ring". Duke Math. J. 164, no. 6, 1139–1185. MR 3336842.
- Wood, Melanie (2011). "Gauss composition over an arbitrary base". Advances in Mathematics. 226 (2): 1756–1771. arXiv:1007.5285. doi:10.1016/j.aim.2010.08.018. MR 2737799.
- Wood, Melanie (2010). "On the probabilities of local behaviors in abelian field extensions". Compos. Math. 146, no. 1, 102–128. MR 2581243
- Wood, Melanie (2003). "P-orderings: a metric viewpoint and the non-existence of simultaneous orderings". Journal of Number Theory. 99 (1): 36–56. doi:10.1016/S0022-314X(02)00056-2. MR 1957243.
