= Mina Rees =

American mathematician (1902–1997)

- Rees, c. 1970
- Born: August 2, 1902; Cleveland, Ohio, US
- Died: October 25, 1997 (aged 95); New York City, US
- Education: Hunter College, University of Chicago, Columbia University
- Known for: Computing, Infrastructure
- Scientific career
- Fields: Mathematics
- Workplaces: American Association for the Advancement of Science, Office of Naval Research, CUNY
- Thesis: Division algebras associated with an equation whose group has four generators (1932)
- Doctoral advisor: Leonard Dickson

Mina Spiegel Rees (August 2, 1902 – October 25, 1997) was an American mathematician. She is known for her assistance to the US Government during WWII, as well as making several breakthroughs for women in science. Her most notable accomplishments include becoming the first female President of the American Association for the Advancement of Science (1971) and head of the mathematics department of the Office of Naval Research of the US. Rees was a pioneer in the history of computing and helped establish funding streams and institutional infrastructure for research. She also helped other women succeed in mathematics with her involvement in the Association for Women in Mathematics as well as her life-long career as a professor at Hunter College.

== Personal life ==
Rees was the daughter of Moses and Alice Louise (née Stackhouse) Rees. Her mother (Alice Louise) emigrated from Germany in 1882. Mina Rees grew up with her four siblings: Elsie Isabella Rees, Albert L Rees, Clyde Harvey Rees, and Calrence Eugene Rees. The family moved from Cleveland, Ohio to the Bronx, New York City. Here, Rees received her primary education in the city's public schools. In 1955, Rees married physician Leopold Brahdy (1892–1977) who she had met a party in 1936. Rees and Brahdy shared a common interest in science which was often spoken of by Rees and she felt that it made them good partners. Mina Rees died in 1997 at the Mary Manning Walsh home in Manhattan.

== Education ==
Rees was accepted to a prestigious school for gifted women known as Hunter College High School in New York City. She graduated valedictorian in 1919 after taking 4 years of mathematics classes. After graduation, Rees attended Hunter College where she majored in mathematics. As a sophomore there, she was given the opportunity to teach a laboratory trigonometry class, which she prepared for by attending a class at Teachers College, Columbia University. While a student, she became a part-time teacher at Hunter High School. She graduated summa cum laude with a math major at Hunter College in 1923. She received a master's degree in mathematics from Teachers College, Columbia University in 1925. At that time, she was told unofficially that "the Columbia mathematics department was not really interested in having women candidates for PhD's". She started teaching at Hunter College then took a sabbatical to study for the doctorate at the University of Chicago in 1929. She earned her doctorate in 1931 with a dissertation on abstract algebra titled "Division algebras associated with an equation whose group has four generators," published in the American Journal of Mathematics, Vol 54 (Jan. 1932), 51–65. Her advisor was Leonard Dickson, who agreed to help Rees with division algebra even though he was no longer in the field. Dickson was known to advise female scientists, and he worked with 8% of all women PhDs in mathematics in the US.

== Career ==
After her graduation from Hunter College, Rees was immediately offered a job as a professor which she declined. Instead, she opted to become a high school teacher at Hunter High School. Her decision was based on the fact she did not feel knowledgeable enough to be teaching at the college level so soon after her own graduation. She worked at Hunter High School as an assistant teacher while also attending Teachers College Columbia University for her master's degree.

After receiving her degree from Colombia University, Rees became an assistant professor at Hunter College in 1925, taking a leave of absence from 1929-1932 to get her PHD from the University of Chicago. In 1940, she was promoted to Associate Professor at Hunter College.

Other positions she held include:

- 1947: She became an ACM Council member.
- 1945–51: Head of Mathematics branch at the Office of Naval Research.
- 1952–53: Deputy Science Director for the Office of Naval Research.
- 1953–61: Rees returned to Hunter College where she became the Dean of Faculty.
- 1961–67: Full Professor and First Dean of Graduate Studies at City University of New York
- 1964–70: Member, U.S. National Science Board
- 1967–69: Provost of the Graduate School and University Center at CUNY.
- 1969–72: Founding president (and, in 1972, first president emerita) of the Graduate School and University Center at CUNY
- 1971: First female president of the AAAS, and first female chair, U.S. Council of Graduate Schools

== Research ==
When working on her PhD at the University of Chicago, Rees was very interested in researching associative algebra. Most of her research was self-taught, as her advisor had switched his focus to number theory. Her thesis was published in 1932 in the American Journal of Mathematics. During her first three years as a professor, she created several book reviews which were published in Scripta Mathematica.

== Contributions during World War II ==
When World War II began many men were drafted. This opened many opportunities for women in fields that they were not prevalent in. Rees took a leave of absence in 1943 to aid in the war efforts. She became a Technical Aide/Executive Assistant with the Applied Mathematics Panel at Office of Scientific Research and Development. She was tasked with problems given by the panel and aided in understanding the mathematical reasoning behind them. Rees was also named the Head of Mathematics branch at the Office of Naval Research. She worked alongside fellow mathematicians such as Edmund Berkely and John Curtiss. Together they developed various technologies that assisted not only in the war, but in civilian life. One of the documented technologies was calculating ballistics tables.

During her time at the Office of Naval Research, Rees headed research in a variety of programs, including hydrofoils, logistics, computers, and numerical development for applications such as rocketry and defense against submarines. She was especially instrumental in developing the ONR's implementation of projects studying mathematical algorithms for computing, as well as university research programs to build computers such as Project Whirlwind at MIT. She was an early proponent of magnetic-core and electrostatic memory, the use of transistor components rather than vacuum tubes, and the design of machines with visual displays and multiple inputs.

== Honors ==
In 1953, the council of the American Mathematical Society adopted a resolution reading stating that under Dr. Rees's "guidance, basic research in general, and especially in mathematics, received the most intelligent and wholehearted support. No greater wisdom and foresight could have been displayed and the whole postwar development of mathematical research in the United States owes an immeasurable debt to the pioneer work of the Office of Naval Research and to the alert, vigorous and farsighted policy conducted by Miss [sic] Rees."

In 1962 Rees received the first Award for Distinguished Service to Mathematics from the Mathematical Association of America. This was "for outstanding service to mathematics, other than mathematical research" and for "contributions [that] influence significantly the field of mathematics or mathematical education on a national scale."

In 1965, Rees was awarded the Achievement Award by the American Association of University Women, an award given annually in honor of women who have made outstanding contributions in their fields.

In 1983, she was awarded the Public Welfare Medal, the highest honor of the National Academy of Sciences. This was given "in recognition of distinguished contributions in the application of science to the public welfare for her contributions to the scientific enterprise, especially in mathematics, astronomy, and computer sciences, from wartime, through the transition from war to peace, and continuing today."

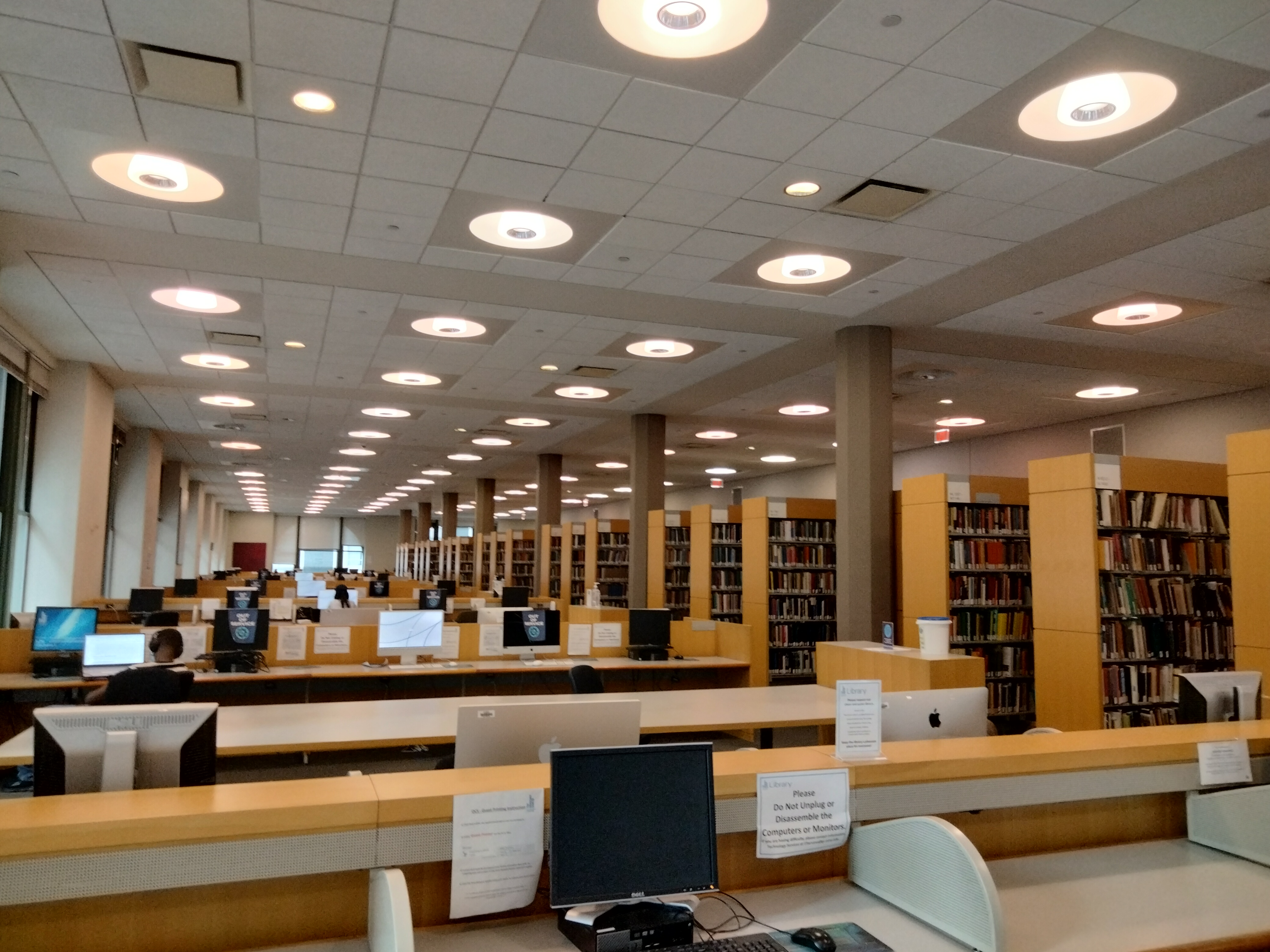
Mina Rees Library

Some of her other notable honors include:

- Kings Medal for Service in the Cause of Freedom (UK) and the President's Certificate of Merit (USA) for her important contributions during World War II.
- At least 18 honorary doctorates.
- Library of Graduate University of the City University of New York named the Mina Rees library in 1985.
- In 1989 the IEEE Computer Society's Computer Pioneer Award.

== Notable publications ==
- 1932: "Division algebras associated with an equation whose group has four generators," American Journal of Mathematics 54: 51–65.
- 1950: "The federal computing machine program" Science 112: 731–736.
- 1952: "Digital Computers - their nature and use" American Scientist 40: 328-335
- 1952: (with Richard Courant and Eugene Isaacson) "On the solution of nonlinear hyperbolic differential equations by finite differences", Communications on Pure and Applied Mathematics 5: 243–255.
- 1953: "Modern Mathematics and the Gifted Student" The Mathematics Teacher 46: 401-406.
- 1954: "Computers:1954" The Scientific Monthly 79: 118-124.
- 1955: "New Frontiers for Mathematicians" Pi Mu Epsilon Journal 2: 122-127.
- 1958: "Mathematics in the Market Place" The American Mathematical Monthly: 332-343.
- 1958: "The impact of the computer" The Mathematics Teacher 51: 162-168.
- 1962: "The Nature of Mathematics" Science, New Series 138: 9-12.
- 1975: "The Scientist in Society: Inspiration and Obligation" American Scientist 63: 144-149.
