= Mathematical Methods in the Physical Sciences =

Book by Mary L. Boas

- Second edition (1983)
- Author: Mary L. Boas
- Subject: Mathematical physics
- Genre: Non-fiction
- Publisher: Wiley
- Publication date: 1966 (1st ed.); 1986 (2nd ed.); 2005 (3rd ed.)
- Publication place: United States
- Media type: Print
- ISBN: 978-0-471-19826-0

Mathematical Methods in the Physical Sciences is a 1966 textbook by mathematician Mary L. Boas intended to develop skills in mathematical problem-solving needed for junior to senior-graduate courses in engineering, physics, and chemistry. The book provides a comprehensive survey of analytic techniques and provides careful statements of important theorems while omitting most detailed proofs. Each section contains a large number of problems, with selected answers. Numerical computational approaches using computers are outside the scope of the book.

The book, now in its third edition, was still widely used in university classrooms as of 1999 and is frequently cited in other textbooks and scientific papers.

== Chapters ==
1. Infinite series, power series
2. Complex numbers
3. Linear algebra
4. Partial differentiation
5. Multiple integrals
6. Vector analysis
7. Fourier series and transforms
8. Ordinary differential equations
9. Calculus of variations
10. Tensor analysis
11. Special functions
12. Series solution of differential equations; Legendre, Bessel, Hermite, and Laguerre functions
13. Partial differential equations
14. Functions of a complex variable
15. Integral transforms
16. Probability and statistics
