= Marjorie Rice =

American amateur mathematician (1923–2017)

- Marjorie Rice (a composite photo showing her in the 1970s)
- Born: Marjorie Jeuck; February 16, 1923; St. Petersburg, Florida
- Died: July 2, 2017 (aged 94); San Diego, California
- Occupation: Amateur mathematician
- Known for: Discoveries of pentagonal tilings

Marjorie Ruth Rice (née Jeuck, 1923–2017) was an American amateur mathematician most famous for her discoveries of pentagonal tilings.

== Background ==
Rice was born February 16, 1923, in St. Petersburg, Florida. Marjorie Rice was a San Diego mother of five, who had become an ardent follower of Martin Gardner's long-running column, "Mathematical Games", which appeared monthly, 1957–1986, in the pages of Scientific American magazine. By the 1970s, Gardner was a popular science writer and amateur mathematician. Rice said later that she would rush to grab each issue from the mail before anyone else could get it, especially her son who subscribed to the magazine.

In 1975, Rice read Gardner's July column, "On Tessellating the Plane with Convex Polygon Tiles", that discussed what kinds of convex polygons can fit together perfectly without any overlaps or gaps to fill the plane. In his column, Gardner indicated that "the task of finding all convex polygons that tile the plane …. was not completed until 1967 when Richard Brandon Kershner … found three pentagonal tilers that had been missed by all predecessors who had worked on the problem". Gardner was repeating Kershner's claim that the list of convex pentagon tilers was complete. But within a month, Gardner received an example, by one of his readers, Richard James III, of a new convex pentagon tiler, and published this news in his December 1975 column.

== Discoveries of pentagonal tilings ==
Four of the pentagonal tilings Rice discovered

Inspired by this new discovery, Rice decided to try to find other new pentagon tilers. Despite having only a high-school education, but a keen interest in art, she began devoting her free time to discovering new pentagonal tilings, ways to tile a plane using pentagons. She worked on the problem in her free time and through the 1975 holiday season "by drawing diagrams on the kitchen table when no one was around and hiding them when her husband and children came home, or when friends stopped by". She even developed her own system of notation to represent the constraints on and relationships between the sides and angles of the pentagons.

By February 1976, she had discovered a new pentagon type and its variations in shape and drew up several tessellations by these pentagon tiles. She mailed her discoveries to Gardner using her own home-made notation. He, in turn, sent Rice's work to Doris Schattschneider, an expert in tiling patterns, who was skeptical at first, saying that Rice's idiosyncratic notation system seemed odd, like "hieroglyphics". But with careful examination, she was able to validate Rice's results.

By October 1976, Rice had discovered 58 pentagon tilings that needed two pentagons stuck together in order to tile "transitively" (most of them previously unknown), which she arranged into 12 classes. By December 1976, she had discovered two additional new types of tessellating pentagons and over 75 distinct tessellations by pentagons that were in blocks that could be seen as "double hexagons". In December 1977, she made her fourth discovery of a new type of pentagon tile and by then had enumerated 103 "2-block transitive" pentagon tilings.

Rice had completed half of a correspondence course in commercial art before she married. Throughout her investigations, she explored how to use pentagonal tilings as grids on which to overlay tessellations of flowers, shells, butterflies and bees.

Rice's discoveries were never published in Gardner's Scientific American columns, but were revealed in an addendum to his original column that was included in his 1988 collection of columns, where he declared her discoveries "fantastic achievements":

"Much of Rice’s investigations remain unpublished, in that only the product of her investigations are shown. How she devised these is not generally shown. However, some of her investigations are indeed shown in The Mathematical Gardner, a compilation of articles in honour of the late Martin Gardner, with Doris Schattschneider’s article In Praise of Amateurs (mostly concerning background detail on Rice’s pentagon tiling findings), pages 140–166. Pages 154–155 contain numerous convex pentagon tilings".

Rice's archival fonds are at the University of Calgary Library, Alberta, Canada, in the Eugène Strens Recreational Mathematics Collection.

== Four pentagonal tiling classes discovered by Marjorie Rice ==
Type 9	Type 11	Type 12	Type 13
b = c = d = e 2A + C = D + 2E = 360°	2a + c = d = e A = 90°, 2B + C = 360° C + E = 180°	2a = d = c + e A = 90°, 2B + C = 360° C + E = 180°	d = 2a = 2e B = E = 90°, 2A + D = 360°

== Recognition ==
In 1995, at a regional meeting of the Mathematical Association of America held in Los Angeles, Schattschneider convinced Rice and her husband to attend her lecture on Rice's work. Before concluding her talk, Schattschneider introduced Rice. "And everybody in the room ... gave her a standing ovation."

In 1999, one of Rice's tilings became the basis for the floor in the foyer of the headquarters of the Mathematical Association of America in Washington, D.C.

In 2025, a children's book was published about Rice, by Amy Alznauer, titled The Five Sides of Marjorie Rice: How to Discover a Shape.

Rice's papers and materials in support of her mathematical discoveries are preserved at the Eugène Strens Recreational Mathematics Collection at the University of Calgary Library, Alberta, Canada.

== Personal life ==
Marjorie Ruth Jeuck married Gilbert Rice in 1945. She had six children, of whom one did not live past infancy.

Rice died July 2, 2017, in San Diego, California.
