= Doris Schattschneider =

American mathematician

- Born: October 19, 1939 (age 86); Staten Island, New York
- Education: Yale University
- Scientific career
- Fields: Mathematics
- Workplaces: Moravian College
- Thesis: Restricted Roots of a Semi-simple Algebraic Group (1966)
- Doctoral advisor: Tsuneo Tamagawa; Ichirô Satake

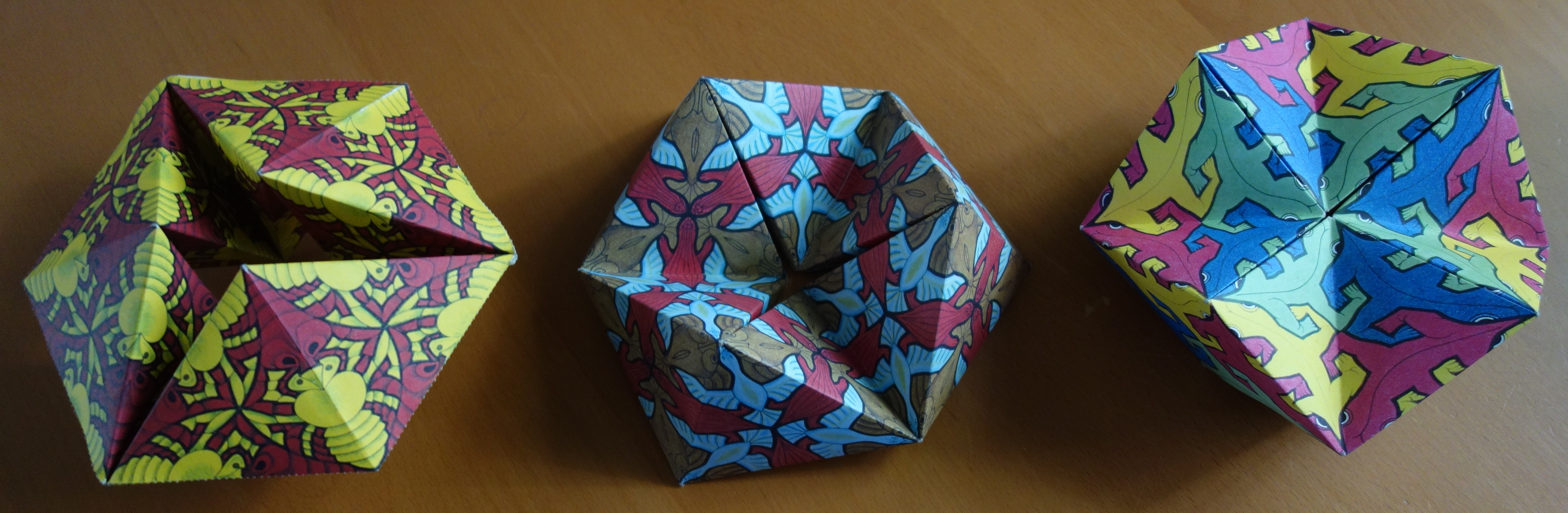
Crafted kaleidocycles from M. C. Escher: Kaleidocycles, based on templates from Doris Schattschneider

Doris J. Schattschneider (née Wood) is an American mathematician, a retired professor of mathematics at Moravian College. She is known for writing about tessellations and about the art of M. C. Escher, for helping Martin Gardner validate and popularize the pentagon tiling discoveries of amateur mathematician Marjorie Rice, and for co-directing with Eugene Klotz the project that developed The Geometer's Sketchpad.

== Biography ==
Schattschneider was born in Staten Island; her mother, Charlotte Lucile Ingalls Wood, taught Latin and was herself the daughter of a Staten Island school principal, and her father, Robert W. Wood, Jr., was an electrical engineer who worked for the New York City Bureau of Bridge Design. Her family moved to Lake Placid, New York during World War II, while her father served as an engineer for the U. S. Army; she began her schooling in Lake Placid, but returned to Staten Island after the war. She did her undergraduate studies in mathematics at the University of Rochester, and earned a Ph.D. in 1966 from Yale University under the joint supervision of Tsuneo Tamagawa and Ichirô Satake with the thesis, Restricted Roots of a Semi-simple Algebraic Group. She taught at Northwestern University for a year and at the University of Illinois at Chicago Circle for three years before joining the faculty of Moravian College in 1968, where she remained for 34 years until her retirement. She was the first female editor of Mathematics Magazine, from 1981 to 1985.

She was married for 54 years to the Rev. Dr. David A. Schattschneider (1939-2016), a church historian and Dean of Moravian Theological Seminary; their daughter Laura Ellen Schattschneider is a lawyer.

== Schattschneider and Marjorie Rice ==
Marjorie Rice was an amateur mathematician in San Diego who became fascinated by Martin Gardner’s descriptions of tessellations by pentagonal tiles in Scientific American. She investigated, and devising her own notation system, found a previously unknown type of pentagon tiling by February 1976. She drew up several tessellations by these new pentagon tiles and mailed her discoveries to Martin Gardner. He, in turn, sent Rice's work to Schattschneider, who was an expert in tiling patterns. Schattschneider was skeptical at first, but upon careful examination, was able to validate Rice's results. Schattschneider not only helped Martin Gardner publicize the pentagon tilings discoveries of Rice, but lauded her work as a significant discovery by an amateur mathematician.

In 1995, at a regional meeting of the Mathematical Association of America held in Los Angeles, Schattschneider convinced Rice and her husband to attend her lecture on Rice's work. At the conclusion of the talk, Schattschneider introduced the amateur mathematician who had advanced the study of tessellation. "And everybody in the room . . . gave her a standing ovation."

== Awards and honors ==
Schattschneider won the Mathematical Association of America's Carl B. Allendoerfer Award for excellence in expository writing in Mathematics Magazine in 1979, for her article "Tiling the plane with congruent pentagons".

In 1993, she (among others) received the Deborah and Franklin Haimo Award for Distinguished College or University Teaching of Mathematics.

In 2012, she became a fellow of the American Mathematical Society.

She delivered the Martin Gardner Lecture at MathFest in August 2021.

== Selected publications ==
Books

- M. C. Escher Kaleidocycles (with Wallace Walker), Ballantine Books, 1977, Pomegranate Artbooks and TACO, 1987, Taschen 2015
- Visions of Symmetry: Notebooks, Periodic Drawings, and Related Work of M. C. Escher (W. H. Freeman, 1990, 1992;

Revised as M. C. Escher: Visions of Symmetry, Harry N. Abrams, 2004)

- A Companion to Calculus (with Dennis Ebersole, Alicia Sevilla, and Kay Somers, Brooks/Cole, 1995)

Edited volumes

- Geometry Turned On!: Dynamic Software in Learning, Teaching, and Research (with James King, Cambridge University Press, 1997)
- M.C. Escher's Legacy: A Centennial Celebration (with Michelle Emmer, Springer, 2003)

Articles

- Schattschneider, Doris (1978), "Tiling the plane with congruent pentagons" (PDF), Mathematics Magazine, 51 (1): 29–44, doi:10.2307/2689644, JSTOR 2689644;

Reprinted with Afterword in The Harmony of the World: 75 Years of Mathematics Magazine, eds. G. Alexanderson and P. Ross, Math. Assoc. of Amer., Washington DC, 2007, pp. 175-190.

- Schattschneider, Doris (1978), "The plane symmetry groups: Their recognition and notation", The American Mathematical Monthly, 85 (6): 439–450, doi:10.1080/00029890.1978.11994612, JSTOR 2320063.
- Schattschneider, Doris (1981), "In praise of amateurs", in Klarner, David A. (ed.), The Mathematical Gardner, Boston: Prindle, Weber & Schmidt, pp. 140–166;

Reprinted as Mathematical Recreations: A Collection in Honor of Martin Gardner, Dover Publications, New York, 1998.

- Schattschneider, Doris (1998), "One Corona is Enough for the Euclidean Plane," coauthor Nikolai Dolbilin. In Quasicrystals and Discrete Geometry (J. Patera, editor). Fields Institute Monographs, Vol. 10, AMS, Providence, RI, 1998, pp. 207–246.

Accompanying web site: Catalog of Isohedral Tilings by Symmetric Polygonal Tiles
