= Gudrun Kalmbach =

German mathematician and educator (1937–2025)

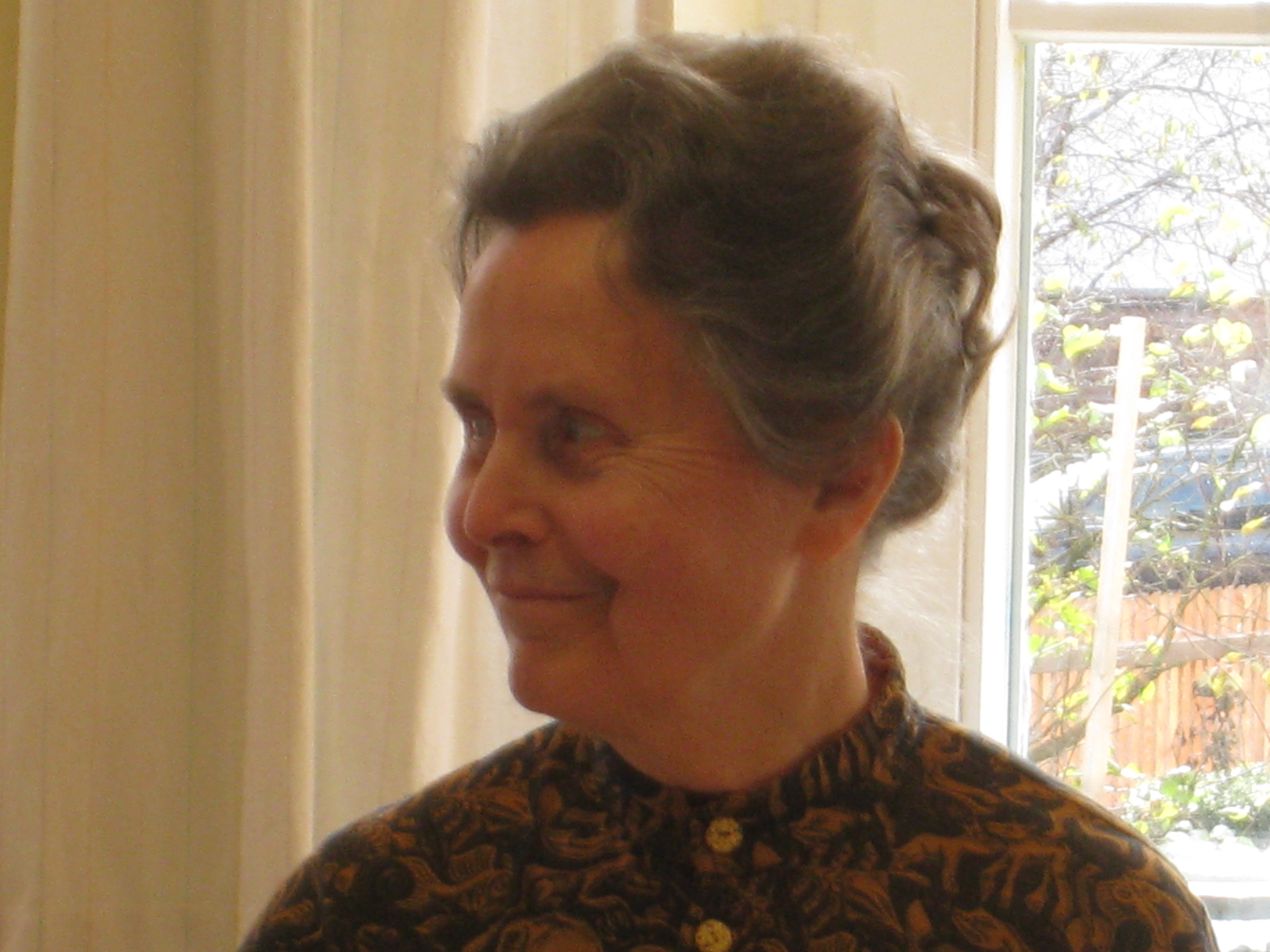
- Born: 27 May 1937; Großerlach, Gau Württemberg-Hohenzollern, Germany
- Died: 25 July 2025 (aged 88); Bad Wörishofen, Bavaria, Germany
- Education: Georg-August-Universität Göttingen
- Scientific career
- Fields: Quantum Logic, Measure Theory
- Workplaces: Universität Ulm
- Thesis: Über niederdimensionale CW-Komplexe in nichtkompakten Mannigfaltigkeiten (1966)
- Doctoral advisor: Hans Grauert

Gudrun Kalmbach (27 May 1937 – 25 July 2025) was a German mathematician and educator known for her contributions in the field of quantum logic and for the educational programmes she developed.

== Life and career ==
After teacher training in mathematics and chemistry, Kalmbach obtained a PhD at the University of Göttingen under the supervision of Hans Grauert on the topic of low-dimensional CW complexes in non-compact manifolds.

From 1967 to 1969, Kalmbach taught at the University of Illinois at Urbana–Champaign. After this she held positions as assistant professor at the University of Massachusetts Amherst (1970–1971) and Pennsylvania State University (1969–1975). In 1975, she qualified as professor at the University of Ulm, becoming the first female professor in geometry (at the chair of number theory and probability theory). She worked there until her retirement in 2002.

Kalmbach's research focused on manifolds, lattice theory and quantum structures.

In addition to her research career, Kalmbach invented in 1985 the talent program in STEM subjects (called MINT in Germany). Part of this is the yearly mathematics competition at the University of Ulm. From this, pupils were selected to attend a mathematics summer school with teaching in computer science, chemistry, physics and where they were introduced to university mathematics.

She was a founder of European Women in Mathematics, and a member and chair of the Emmy Noether Verein which supports female mathematicians.

Kalmbach last lived in Bad Wörishofen, where she died on 25 July 2025, at the age of 88.

== Selected publications ==
- Kalmbach, Gudrun (1983). Orthomodular lattices. London New York: Academic Press. ISBN 0123945801.
- Kalmbach, Gudrun (1986). Measures and Hilbert lattices. Singapore: World Scientific. ISBN 9971500094.
- Kalmbach, Gudrun (1988). Diskrete Mathematik : ein Intensivkurs für Studienanfänger mit Turbo Pascal-Programmen. Braunschweig: Vieweg. ISBN 3528063033.
- Kalmbach, Gudrun (1996). Mathematik - bunt gemischt. Velten: Becker. ISBN 389597269X.
- Kalmbach, Gudrun (1998). Quantum measures and spaces. Dordrecht Boston: Kluwer. ISBN 0792352882.
- Kalmbach, Gudrun (2017). MINT-Wigris Volume 1-2. Bad Wörishofen: MINT Verlag. ISBN 978-3-9818217-1-0.
- Kalmbach (et al. ed.), Gudrun (2020). MINT (Mathematik, Informatik, Naturwissenschaften, Technik), Volume 1-65. Bad Wörishofen: MINT Verlag.
- Kalmbach H.E., G. ‘‘Archives KHE 1967-2019.‘‘ Bad Woerishofen, about 1000 volumes on science, mathematics, equal opportunity for women in mathematics
- Kalmbach, G. ‘‘Orthomodular Logic.‘‘ Z. Logik und Grundl. Math. 20 (1974), 395-406
- Kalmbach (ed.), G. ‘‘Proceedings of the Lattice Theory Conference.‘‘ Universitaet Ulm, 1975
- Kalmbach, G. ‘‘On some results in Morse Theory.‘‘ Canadian J. Math. 26 (1975), 88-105
- Kalmbach, G. ‘‘Extension of topological Homology Theory to Partially Ordered Sets.‘‘ J. reine und angew. Math. 280 (1976), 134-156

== Sources ==
- Houdek, Frank. "MINT-Wigris by Frank Houdek".
- Kalmbach, Gudrun. "MINT-Wigris project".
