= Marie-Françoise Roy =

French mathematician and academic

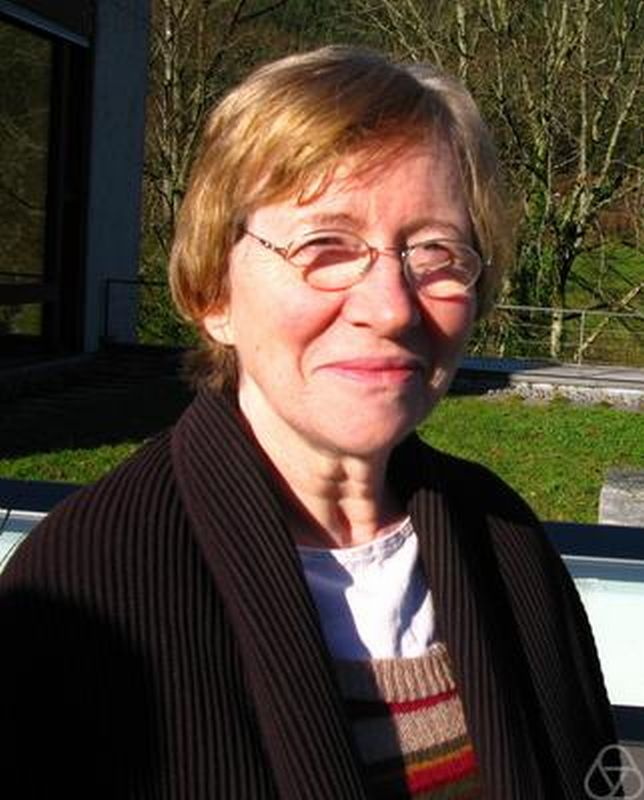
- Marie-Francoise Roy 2009 in Oberwolfach
- Born: 1950 (age 75–76); Paris
- Education: Paris 13 University
- Scientific career
- Fields: Mathematics
- Workplaces: University of Rennes 1
- Doctoral advisor: Jean Bénabou

Marie-Françoise Roy (born 28 April 1950 in Paris) is a French mathematician noted for her work in real algebraic geometry. She has been Professor of Mathematics at the University of Rennes 1 since 1985 and in 2009 was made a Chevalier of the French Legion of Honour. In 2004, she received an Irène Joliot-Curie Prize.

== Research ==
Roy works in real algebraic geometry in particular real spectra and, most recently, in complexity of algorithms in real algebraic geometry and also the applications.

== Education and career ==
Marie-Françoise Roy got her education at École Normale Supérieure de jeunes filles and was an assistant professor at Université Paris Nord during 1973. She received her PhD at Université Paris Nord in 1980, supervised by Jean Bénabou.

From 1981 she spent two years at Abdou Moumouni University in Niger. In 1985 she became a professor at University of Rennes 1 in Rennes, France.

== Service ==
Roy was president of Société Mathématique de France from 2004 to 2007.

In 1986, Roy was one of the founders of European Women in Mathematics (EWM), and was the convenor (president) of EWM 2009–2013. In 1987 she co-founded the French organization for women in mathematics, Femmes et Mathématiques, and became the organization's first president.

Roy is scientific officer for Sub-Saharan Africa in Centre International de Mathématiques Pures et Appliquées, CIMPA. Roy is president of Association d'Echanges Culturels Cesson Dankassari (Tarbiyya-Tatali) an organization working for joint activities in a commune Dan-Cassari in Niger and the French commune Cesson-Sévigné.

== Honours and awards ==
In December 2022, Roy was awarded an Honorary Doctorate of Science (DSc) by the University of Bath. The award recognises Marie-Françoise's work both in algebraic geometry, but also 'as a leading activist for the cause of women in mathematics, and [as] one of the most prominent and effective advocates for African mathematics.'

== Selected publications ==
- with Saugata Basu, Richard Pollack: Algorithms in real algebraic geometry. Springer 2003.pdf-file freely available on author's homepage
- with Jacek Bochnak, Michel Coste: Real algebraic geometry. 2.Edition, Springer, Ergebnisse der Mathematik Bd. 36, 1998 (first in French 1. Edition 1987).
- Three Problems in real algebraic geometry and their descendants. In: Engquist, Schmid: Mathematics unlimited- 2001 and beyond. Springer Verlag 2000, S. 991 (Hilberts 17th Problem, Algorithms, Topology of real algebraic varieties).
- Géométrie algébrique réelle. In: Jean-Paul Pier (Hrsg.): Development of Mathematics 1950-2000. Birkhäuser 2000.
- Introduction a la geometrie algebrique reelle, Cahiers Sem. Hist. Math., 1991, Online
