= Niang =

Niang is a West African surname. Notable people with the surname include:

- Abdoulaye Niang (born 1983), Senegalese–French footballer
- Assmaa Niang (born 1983), Moroccan judoka
- Babacar Niang (born 1958), Senegalese-French middle distance runner
- Babacar Niang (basketball) (born 1991), French basketball player
- Cheick Tidiane Niang (born 1996), Malian footballer
- Diawandou Diagne Niang (born 1994), Senegalese footballer
- El Hadj Malick Niang (born 1995), Senegalese footballer
- El-Hadji Arona Niang (born 1985), Senegalese footballer
- Fallou Niang (born 1995), Senegalese footballer
- Fatou Niang Siga (1932–2022), Senegalese author and schoolteacher
- Georges Niang (born 1993), American basketball player
- Hamane Niang (born 1952), Malian politician
- Idah Sithole-Niang (born 1957), Zimbabwean biochemist and educator
- Idrissa Niang (born 1992), Senegalese footballer
- Jean-Ismaila Niang (born 1987), Senegalese footballer
- Lena Niang (born 1996), Senegalese basketball player
- Lucas Niang (born 1998), American football player
- Mamadou Niang, multiple people
- Mame Bassine Niang (1951–2013), Senegalese lawyer
- Mame Niang (born 1984), Senegalese footballer
- Mamor Niang (born 2002), Spanish footballer
- M'Baye Niang (born 1994), French–Senegalese footballer
- Mohamed Niang (born 1976), Senegalese basketball player
- Mouhamed Niang (born 1999), Senegalese footballer
- Nafissatou Niang Diallo (1941–1982), Senegalese writer
- Ndew Niang (born 1954), Senegalese middle-distance runner
- Ousmane Niang (born 1980), Senegalese sprinter
- Papa Niang (born 1988), Senegalese footballer
- Saliou Niang (born 2004), Senegalese basketball player
- Sophie Dabo-Niang, French-Senegalese mathematician
- Rokhaya Niang, Senegalese actress
- Thierno Niang (born 1990), Senegalese basketball player
- Thierno Niang (footballer) (born 1992), Senegalese footballer
- Wally Niang (born 1996), Senegalese basketball player
