= Diop =

Diop (Wolof: [ɟɔp]), uncommonly spelled Dioup, is a popular Wolof surname in Senegal and Gambia (where it is commonly written "Jobe"), and may refer to:

- Aïda Diop (born 1970), Senegalese sprinter
- Alioune Diop (1910–1980) Senegalese writer and editor, founder of the journal Présence africaine
- Alice Diop (born 1979), French filmmaker
- Aminata Diop (born circa 1968), Malian woman who fled to France to escape a female genital mutilation procedure
- Babacar Diop (disambiguation), several people
- Binta Zahra Diop (born 1990), Senegalese swimmer
- Birago Diop (1906–1989), Senegalese poet and diplomat
- Boubacar Boris Diop (born 1946), Senegalese writer and journalist
- Cheikh Anta Diop (1923–1986), Senegalese historian, anthropologist, physicist and politician
- David Diop (1927–1960), poet
- David Diop (born 1966), French novelist
- DeSagana Diop (born 1982), Senegalese basketballer
- Djibril Diop Mambéty (1945–1998), Senegalese film director
- Issa Diop (disambiguation), several people
- Khoudia Diop (born 1996), Senegalese fashion model
- Lat Dior Ngoné Latyr Diop (1842–1886), Senegalese king of Cayor
- Mamadou Diop (disambiguation), several people
- Mati Diop (born 1982), French film director and actress
- Ndèye Tické Ndiaye Diop, Senegalese politician
- Oumy Diop (born 2003), French-Senegalese swimmer
- Papa Bouba Diop (1978–2020), Senegalese footballer
- Papa Kouli Diop (born 1986), Senegalese footballer
- Papa Malick Diop (born 1974), Senegalese footballer
- Pape Seydou Diop (born 1979), Senegalese footballer
- Pape Diop (born 1954), Senegalese politician
- Sofiane Diop (born 2000), French-born Moroccan footballer
- Wasis Diop (born 1950), Senegalese musician
- Fatou Dioup (born 1994), Mauritanian footballer

In fiction:

- Assane Diop is the protagonist of the French TV series Lupin, played by Omar Sy
