= Eko Boys' High School =

Secondary school in Lagos, Nigeria

- Lagos; Nigeria

Information
- Established: 1913; 113 years ago
- Founder: William Benjamin Euba
- Gender: Boys

Eko Boys' High School (EBHS) is a boys' secondary school in Mushin, Lagos State, Nigeria. It was founded on 13 January 1913 by the Reverend William Benjamin Euba, a Methodist minister and educationist. The school was established as a privately owned, non-denominational institution intended to admit pupils on merit, irrespective of their ethnic or religious background.

== History ==
Eko Boys' High School was founded by Reverend William Benjamin Euba in response to the admission practices of some mission schools in colonial Lagos. Euba believed that qualified children should not be denied admission because of their religious, cultural or ethnic backgrounds. The school was therefore established as a Nigerian-owned and non-denominational institution offering admission on merit.

The school opened on 13 January 1913. During its early history, it operated from different locations on Lagos Island, including Broad Street, Oil Mill Street and Ajele Street, before moving to its present campus in Mushin.

Eko Boys' High School subsequently developed a reputation as one of the prominent secondary schools in Lagos. Its former students became known as “Ekorians”.

The school came under the control of the Lagos State Government following the government takeover of schools. Unlike a number of mission-founded schools that were later returned to their original owners, Eko Boys' High School remained under government administration.

Plans were later considered for the development of another campus. Land was allocated for the school at Abijo, in the Ibeju-Lekki area, although the Mushin campus continued to operate.

== School tradition ==
The school motto is the Latin phrase In Domino Confidimus, meaning “In God we trust”.

Former students of the school are commonly called Ekorians. The school anthem was composed by V. G. Chinwa, a former student who later returned to the school as a teacher and subsequently served as principal.

== Centenary ==
Eko Boys' High School celebrated its centenary in January 2013. Activities marking the anniversary included a public lecture, novelty football match, visits to traditional rulers, a thanksgiving service and an award and fundraising dinner held at the Nigerian Law School in Victoria Island, Lagos.

The centenary celebration recognised several former students for their contributions to public service, education, business and society. They included Babatunde Fashola, Bisi Onasanya, Rasheed Raji, Aderemi Kuku, Lekan Ogunbanwo and James Caulcrick.

== Alumni association ==
The Eko Boys' High School Old Boys Association, commonly known as EKOBA, is the umbrella organisation of former students of the school. The association and its graduating-year groups have supported the school through infrastructure, educational and welfare projects.

Projects inaugurated during the school’s 112th Founders' Day celebration in January 2025 included the Adefule Gate, a pedestrian gate and gatehouse, and a basketball court at the Mushin campus.

== Alumni ==
- Adeyinka Adebayo, Nigerian Army general and former military governor of the Western Region
- Babatunde Fashola, former governor of Lagos State and former federal minister
- Gabriel Igbinedion, Nigerian businessman and traditional chief
- Abubakar Olusola Saraki, physician and politician
- Idowu Sofola, lawyer and former president of the Nigerian Bar Association
- Ola Oni, economist and political activist
- Bisi Alimi, human-rights activist
- Aderemi Kuku, mathematician and academic
- Rasheed Raji, retired naval officer and former military administrator
- Lekan Ogunbanwo, broadcaster and public administrator
- Kunle Ajayi, gospel saxophonist and pastor
- Yemi Shodimu, actor, filmmaker and television presenter
- Tunde King, musician associated with the development of Jùjú music
- Orlando Martins, Nigerian-British film and stage actor
- Bola Johnson, musician and bandleader
- Funsho Davies Owoyemi, chartered accountant, management consultant and community leader.
- Justice Muritala Aremu Okunola, Nigerian jurist and judge of the Lagos State High Court. He served as senior prefect while attending Eko Boys’ High School.
- Ashafa Ajibola Erogbogbo, elder statesman and retired aviation supervisor at Shell Nigeria.
- Reuben Olorunfunmi Basorun, lawyer, banker and former Secretary to the Lagos State Government.
- Bisi Onasanya, chartered accountant and former group managing director and chief executive officer of First Bank of Nigeria.
- Aderemi Kuku, mathematician and former president of the African Mathematical Union and the African Academy of Sciences.
- Kehinde Gbadewole Olugbenle, the Olu of Ilaro and Paramount Ruler of Yewaland.
- Kola Ibirogba, industrial and forensic psychologist and security consultant.
- Olukunmi Olusesan Akingbola, the Olu of Oregun and former educator in the United States.
- Alao Aka-Bashorun, lawyer, human-rights activist and former president of the Nigerian Bar Association.
- James Caulcrick, retired assistant inspector-general of police.
- Taiwo Lakanu, retired deputy inspector-general of police and lawyer.
- Hakeem Akinola Gbajabiamila, civil engineer, real-estate developer and former Lagos State Commissioner for Urban and Physical Planning.
