= Babacar (name) =

Babacar is a given name and a surname. Notable people with the name include the following people

Given name

- Babacar Ba (1930–2006), Senegalese politician
- Babacar Camara (born 1981), Senegalese basketball player
- Babacar Cissé (born 1975), Senegalese basketball player
- Babacar Diallo (born 1989), Senegalese football player
- Babacar Diop (disambiguation), several people
- Babacar Fati (born 2000), Portuguese-born Bissau-Guinean footballer
- Babacar Gaye (born 1951), Senegalese Army General
- Babacar Gueye (born 1986), Senegalese football striker
- Babacar Guèye (born 1994), French football player
- Babacar Khane (born 1935), practitioner of yoga, author, and mystical poet
- Babacar M'Bengue (born 1991), German football player
- Babacar N'Diaye (born 1973), Senegalese football player
- Babacar Niang (born 1958), Senegalese-French middle-distance runner
- Babacar Niang (basketball) (born 1991), French basketball player
- Babacar Sar (born 1962), Mauritanian freestyle wrestler
- Babacar Sarr (born 1991), Senegalese football player

Surname

- Khouma Babacar (born 1993), Senegalese football player
