= Ismaila (name) =

Ismaila is an African name that may refer to

Given name

- Ismaila Atte-Oudeyi (born 1985), Togolese footballer
- Ismaila Isa Funtua (1942–2020), Nigerian statesman
- Ismaila Gwarzo, Nigerian National Security Advisor
- Ismaila Jagne (born 1984), Gambian football midfielder
- Ismaila Jome (born 1994), Gambian footballer
- Ismaila Lassissi (born 1969), Ivorian rugby union footballer
- Ismaïla Manga (1957–2015), Senegalese Jola painter
- Ismaïla N'Diaye (born 1988), Senegalese football player
- Jean-Ismaila Niang (born 1987), Senegalese football player
- Ismaila Sané, Senegalese-born percussionist, singer and solo dancer
- Ismaila Sanyang, Agricultural Minister of the Republic of the Gambia
- Ismaïla Sarr (born 1998), Senegalese football player
- Ismaïla Sy (born 1979), French basketball player

Surname

- Halimat Ismaila (born 1984), Nigerian track and field athlete
