= Ismaila (disambiguation) =

Ismaila is a town and Union Council in Pakistan. Ismaila may also refer to:

- Ismaila Haryana, a village in Haryana, India
- Ismaila Shareef, a village in Punjab, Pakistan
- Ismaila (name), various people

== See also ==
- Ismailia
