= Rebecca Walo Omana =

Congolese mathematician born in 1951

- Born: 15 July 1951 (age 75); Democratic Republic of the Congo
- Education: Université catholique de Louvain
- Known for: first female mathematics professor in the Democratic Republic of the Congo
- Scientific career
- Fields: Mathematics
- Workplaces: Professor at the University of Kinshasa
- Doctoral advisor: Jean Mawhin

Rebecca Walo Omana (born 15 July 1951) is a Congolese mathematician, professor, and reverend sister. Omana became the first female mathematics professor in the Democratic Republic of the Congo in 1982. She is the director of the mathematics and informatics doctoral program at the University of Kinshasa and is a vice-president of the African Women in Mathematics Association. Her mathematical interests lie in differential equations, nonlinear analysis, and modeling.

== Biography ==
Omana was born in the Democratic Republic of the Congo, on 15 July 1951. She was passionate about mathematics during high school. She made her religious profession to the Catholic Soeurs de St Francois d'Assise at the age of 18, and made her sacred vows in 1978.

Omana earned a bachelor’s of science in mathematics from the Université du Québec à Montréal in 1979. She earned her master’s of science in 1982 from the Université Laval. In both institutions, she was the only African woman in the department. Of this period Omana says:

I had to double effort to be better and remove negative prejudices in the heads of my colleagues and my professors to be accepted. But in view of results, I was not only accepted but invited by groups of colleagues for research works.

In 1982, Omana began working as a lecturer and became the first female mathematics professor in the Democratic Republic of the Congo.

Omana earned her Diplôme d'études approfondies in 1985 and her Ph.D. in 1990 from the Université catholique de Louvain where she worked with advisor Jean Mawhin. She was the first Congolese woman to earn a doctorate there.

At the founding of the quarterly multidisciplinary journal la revue Notre Dame de la Sagesse (RENODAS), Omana was listed as the director. She has supervised numerous doctoral students. She hopes that some of her doctoral students will join her among the small number of female professors in the Democratic Republic of the Congo. Omana heads the mathematics doctoral program at the University of Kinshasa. Since 2010, she has served as the rector for the Université Notre-Dame de Tshumbe (UNITSHU), a Catholic public university which was founded in 2010 in Tshumbe, Democratic Republic of the Congo.

== Mathematical works ==
Omana has published two mathematics books and over 20 mathematics articles. Her work on ordinary differential equations and fuzzy logic has had applications in fields such as epidemiology and law. Her mathematics articles are mostly centered on mathematical modelling and functional analysis.

== Personal life ==
Omana's parents are not academics, but some siblings hold master's degrees. Her teachers and father influenced her decision to become a mathematician.

She has said "mathematics is fantastic; as its name is female, it is a domain that should belong to us women". (Note: Referring to the French word mathématiques, which has the feminine gender)

== See also ==
- Timeline of women in mathematics
- Grace Alele-Williams
- Marie Françoise Ouedraogo

== Academic leadership ==
Omana has served as Director of the doctoral programme in Mathematics and Computer Science at the University of Kinshasa, where she has supervised doctoral research and contributed to the development of postgraduate mathematics education. Since 2010, she has also served as Rector of the Université Notre-Dame de Tshumbe, a Catholic university in the Democratic Republic of the Congo.

== Research ==
Omana's research focuses on nonlinear analysis, ordinary and partial differential equations, fuzzy differential equations, mathematical modelling, epidemiology and financial mathematics. Her work has explored the existence of solutions to nonlinear differential equations, optimal control models and applications of mathematics to public health and finance.

== Selected publications ==
- Omana, Rebecca; Ramadhani, Issa (2010). "A critical point theorem for noncontinuous functionals". International Journal of Functional Analysis, Operator Theory and Applications.
- Omana, Rebecca (2008). "Periodic solution of nonlinear fuzzy differential equations". Advances in Fuzzy Sets and Systems.
- Mawhin, Jean; Omana, Rebecca (1992). "A priori bounds and existence of positive solutions for some singular superlinear boundary value problems". Funkcialaj Ekvacioj.

== Mentorship ==
Throughout her academic career, Omana has supervised doctoral students in mathematics and has encouraged the participation of women in advanced mathematical research in the Democratic Republic of the Congo through postgraduate training and academic mentoring.

== Honours ==
In 2024, the University of Kinshasa recognised Omana as Professor Emerita, acknowledging her long-standing contributions to mathematics teaching, research and higher education in the Democratic Republic of the Congo.
