= Hans-Wilhelm Knobloch =

German mathematician (1927–2019)

- Born: 18 March 1927; Schmalkalden, Germany
- Died: 10 July 2019 (aged 92)
- Education: University of Greifswald (1946 - 1950), Humboldt University of Berlin (1950 PhD)
- Occupation: Mathematician
- Years active: 1950–2014?
- Known for: Establishing the study of control theory in Germany

Hans-Wilhelm Knobloch (18 March 1927, in Schmalkalden – 10 July 2019) was a German mathematician, specializing in dynamical systems and control theory. Although the field of mathematical systems and control theory was already well-established in several other countries, Hans-Wilhelm Knobloch and Diederich Hinrichsen were the two mathematicians of most importance in establishing this field in Germany.

== Education and career ==
After completing undergraduate study in mathematics from 1946 to 1950 at the University of Greifswald, he matriculated at the Humboldt University of Berlin, where he received his PhD in 1950. His thesis Über galoissche Algebren (On Galois algebras) was supervised by Helmut Hasse. After completing his doctorate, Knobloch, with the aid of a scholarship, followed Hasse to the University of Hamburg.

In 1952 and 1953 Knobloch held a teaching appointment at the University of Würzburg, after which he was offered a scholarship to complete his habilitation. After completing his habitation at the University of Würzburg in 1957, he was appointed to a substitute professorship in Münster. He held temporary academic posts at the Technical University of Munich, the University of Michigan from 1962 to 1963, and Denmark's Aarhus University from 1963 to 1965. From 1965 to 1970 he held a full professorship at Technische Universität Berlin. In 1970 at the University of Würzburg he accepted the professorial chair for control theory and dynamical systems, which he held until his retirement as professor emeritus in 1995.

In the 1950s Knobloch published several papers in algebra and number theory. In 1958 he published two papers in integral transforms and differential equations. By the 1960s he focused on differential equations and control theory. He made important contributions in the theory of the existence of periodic solutions of non-linear differential equations, the construction of integral manifolds for ordinary differential equations, and necessary higher-order conditions for optimal control problems. In 1983 he was an invited speaker at the International Congress of Mathematicians in Warsaw.

Knobloch was the author or co-author of several books and book chapters. His book on ordinary differential equations, co-authored with Franz Kappel, and his book linear control theory, co-authored with Huibert Kwakernaak, became standard textbooks in Germany. Knobloch promoted interdisciplinary cooperation with engineers and international cooperation among mathematicians. For the Oberwolfach workshops over many years he was one of the organizers, with Peter Sagirow, Manfred Thoma, and Huibert Kwakernaak, on the topic of control theory and, with Rolf Reissig, Jean Mawhin, and Klaus Schmitt, on the topic of ordinary differential equations. Knobloch played a key role in organizing the Equadiff conference held in Würzburg from 23 to 28 August in 1982.

== Selected publications ==
- Knobloch, Hans-Wilhelm (1955). "Zum Hilbertschen Irreduzibilitätssatz". Abhandlungen aus dem Mathematischen Seminar der Universität Hamburg. 19 (3–4): 176–190. doi:10.1007/BF02988871. S2CID 123326969.
- Knobloch, Hans-Wilhelm (1957). "Die Seltenheit der reudziblen Polynome". Jahresbericht der Deutschen Mathematiker-Vereinigung. 59: 12–19.
- Knobloch, Hans-Wilhelm (1958). "Zusammenhänge zwischen konvergenten und asymptotischen Entwicklungen bei Lösungen linearer Differentialsysteme vom Range Eins". Mathematische Annalen. 134 (3): 260–288. doi:10.1007/BF01343212. S2CID 120642015.
- Knobloch, H. W. (1962). "An existence theorem for periodic solutions of nonlinear ordinary differential equations". Michigan Mathematical Journal. 9 (4): 303–309. doi:10.1307/mmj/1028998768.
- Knobloch, Hans-Wilhelm (1963). "Eine neue Methode zur Approximation periodischer Lösungen nicht-linearer Differentialgleichungen zweiter Ordnung". Mathematische Zeitschrift. 82 (3): 177–197. doi:10.1007/BF01111422. S2CID 122951796. (over 100 citations)
- Knobloch, H. W. (1963). "Remarks on a paper of L. Cesari on functional analysis and nonlinear differential equations". Michigan Mathematical Journal. 10 (4): 417–430. doi:10.1307/mmj/1028998978.
- Knobloch, Hans-Wilhelm (1963). "Zwei Kriterien für die Existenz periodischer Lösungen von Differentialgleichungen zweiter Ordnung". Archiv der Mathematik. 14: 182–185. doi:10.1007/BF01234941. hdl:2027.42/45847. S2CID 120042009.
- Knobloch, Hans-Wilhelm (1964). "Wachstum und oszillatorisches Verhalten von Lösungen linearer Differentialgleichungen zweiter Ordnung". Jahresbericht der Deutschen Mathematiker-Vereinigung. 66: 138–152.
- Knobloch, H.-W (1970). "On the existence of periodic solutions for second order vector differential equations". Journal of Differential Equations. 9 (1): 67–85. Bibcode:1970JDE.....9...67K. doi:10.1016/0022-0396(70)90154-3.
- Knobloch, H.W. (1977). "Local Controllability in Nonlinear Systems". Dynamical Systems. pp. 157–174. doi:10.1016/B978-0-12-083750-2.50016-3. ISBN 978-0-12-083750-2.
- Knobloch, H. W.; Schmitt, K. (1977). "Non-linear boundary value problems for systems of differential equations†". Proceedings of the Royal Society of Edinburgh Section A: Mathematics. 78 (1–2): 139–159. doi:10.1017/S0308210500009902. ISSN 0308-2105. S2CID 124676830.
- Knobloch, H. W. (1979). "Boundary value problems for systems of nonlinear differential equations". Equadiff IV. Lecture Notes in Mathematics. Vol. 703. pp. 197–204. doi:10.1007/BFb0067273. hdl:10338.dmlcz/702220. ISBN 978-3-540-09116-5.
- Knobloch, H. W. (1984). "On the Principle of "Internal Modelling" in Linear Control Theory". Selected Topics in Operations Research and Mathematical Economics: Proceedings of the 8th Symposium on Operations Research, held at the University of Karlsruhe, West Germany August 22–25, 1983. Lecture Notes in Economics and Mathematical Systems. Vol. 226. Springer Verlag. pp. 131–151. doi:10.1007/978-3-642-45567-4_9. ISBN 978-3-540-12918-9. article in 2012 reprint
- Aulbach, Bernd; Flockerzi, Dietrich; Knobloch, Hans-Wilhelm (1986). "Invariant manifolds and the concept of asymptotic phase". Časopis Pro Pěstování Matematiky. 111 (2): 156–176. doi:10.21136/CPM.1986.118274. hdl:10338.dmlcz/118274.
- Knobloch, E.; De Luca, J. (1990). "Amplitude equations for travelling wave convection". Nonlinearity. 3 (4): 975–980. Bibcode:1990Nonli...3..975K. doi:10.1088/0951-7715/3/4/001. MR 1079278. S2CID 250772975.
- Knobloch, H. W. (1990). "A new view of center manifolds". Equadiff 7: 88–91.
- Knobloch, H.W. (1992). "Invariant Manifolds for Ordinary Differential Equations". Differential Equations and Mathematical Physics. Mathematics in Science and Engineering. Vol. 186. pp. 121–149. doi:10.1016/S0076-5392(08)63378-0. ISBN 978-0-12-089040-8.
- Knobloch, H. W. (1992). "Foundation of Invariant Manifold Theory for Ordinary Differential Equations". Recent Trends in Differential Equations. pp. 365–392. doi:10.1142/9789812798893_0027. ISBN 978-981-02-0963-6.
- Knobloch, H. W.; Pohl, M. (1997). "On Riccati Matrix Differential Equations". Results in Mathematics. 31 (3–4): 337–364. doi:10.1007/BF03322169. S2CID 119621747.
- Knobloch, H.W.; Ebenbauer, C.; Allgöwer, F. (2002). "A Framework for Disturbance Attenuation by Discontinuous Control". IFAC Proceedings Volumes. 35: 417–422. doi:10.3182/20020721-6-ES-1901.00231.
- Knobloch, H. W. (2006). "Observability of nonlinear systems". Mathematica Bohemica. 131 (4): 411–418. doi:10.21136/MB.2006.133974. hdl:10338.dmlcz/133974.

== Books ==
- Knobloch, H. W.; Kappel, F. (17 April 2013). Gewöhnliche Differentialgleichungen. ISBN 978-3-322-94717-8. (1st edition 1974)
- Knobloch, H. W.; Schmitt, K. (5 January 2007). Equadiff 82: Proceedings of the International Conference Held in Würzburg, FRG, August 23-28, 1982. ISBN 978-3-540-38678-0. (1st edition 1983)
- Knobloch, H. W.; Kwakernaak, H. (2 July 2013). Lineare Kontrolltheorie. ISBN 978-3-642-69884-2. (pbk reprint of 1985 hbk 1st edition)
- Knobloch, H. W. (2014). Disturbance Attenuation for Uncertain Control Systems. Lecture Notes in Control and Information Sciences. Vol. 448. doi:10.1007/978-3-319-00957-5. ISBN 978-3-319-00956-8; with contributions by Alberto Isidori and Dietrich Flockerzi
