= Carolina Benedetti =

Colombian mathematician and educator

Carolina Benedetti Velasquez is a Colombian mathematician and educator who worked as an assistant professor at the University of the Andes. She specialized in combinatorial objects, algebraic structures, geometry, Ehrhart polynomial, and supercharacters theory. She also a founder of Mathematical Circles Colombia, an initiative designed to teach mathematical thinking to communities outside the university. She has received several fellowships, which are from the Centre International de Mathématiques Pures et Appliquées (CIMPA), the Institute of the Mathematical Sciences of the Americas (IMSA) and Lluís Santaló Fellowship from Centre de Recerca Matemàtica.

== Education and organization ==
Benedetti studied her bachelor's degree at the Universidad Nacional de Colombia in Bogotá, Colombia. She studied her MSc in mathematics at the Universidad de los Andes, Colombia. She was awarded a PhD by the York University in Toronto, Canada in 2013. Her thesis was titled "Combinatorial Hopf algebras and supercharacters." Benedetti researches combinatorial objects, algebraic structures, geometry and Ehrhart theory. She has also contributed to the study of the theory of supercharacters.

Benedetti has worked as a visiting associate professor at Michigan State University in the United States and has been employed as an assistant professor at the Universidad de los Andes since 2023. She is a member of Comunidad Colombiana de Combinatoria and the Comisión de Equidad y Género (Gender and Equity Commission), She is co-executive director of Mathematical Circles Colombia and founder of this initiative, which teaches mathematical thinking to students and the communities outside the university.

== Fellowship ==
She was a 2022 laureate of the Research in Pairs programme, awarded by the Centre International de Mathématiques Pures et Appliquées. In 2024, She later received a 2024 fellowship from the Institute of the Mathematical Sciences of the Americas and in 2026, she was named a Lluís Santaló Fellow, honoring the mathematician Luis Santaló that awarded by Centre de Recerca Matemàtica.

== Personal life ==
Benedetti is learning to play Pacific music.
