= Dattaur =

Village in Haryana, India

Dattaur is a village in Haryana, India. It is located 4 kilometres (2.5 mi) from Sampla, 275 kilometres (171 mi) from Chandigarh and 45 kilometres (28 mi) from New Delhi.

Dattaur is known as Shri Shri 1008, the so-called sacred place of Baba Sitaram. The village is also known as a Brahmin-dominated village. Baba Sitaram is worshipped as a deity of Dattaur.

== Demographics ==
There are about 2,800 voters in Dattaur. The literacy rate of the village is 85%.

80% of the residents are employed in private and government professions. There is also an emphasis on making residents self-reliant. Loans and necessary facilities are provided to the youth and farmers, through government schemes based on the Punjab National Bank, the only bank in the village.

The main languages in the village are Hindi, Haryanvi, Sanskrit and Punjabi, with most speaking Hindi and Punjabi.

== Other information ==
Dattaur uses India's dialling code (+91), the Indian rupee, India's domain name extension (.in) and follows Indian Standard Time (IST). The sunrise time varies by 23 minutes from IST.

== Transportation ==
The nearest railway station to Dattaur is Ismaila Haryana which is 2.7 km away. The following table shows other railway stations and its distance from Marakudi.

Railway Station	Distance
Ismaila Haryana railway station	2.7 km.
Sampla railway station	3.9 km.
Kharawar railway station	7.9 km.
Asaudah railway station	13.0 km.
Asthal Bohar railway station	

== Education ==
- Greenland Public School
- Government Senior Secondary School
- Genius Play School
- Government High School
- Charan Singh Memorial Convent Secondary School

== Infrastructure ==
A clean and systematic temple complex is built in the village. There is also a bank, Chaupal, dispensary, library, veterinary hospital, water house, Panchayat house, Bhagwan Parshuram Ashram, Gaushala, water treatment plant and government and private school premises. The main attractions are the Hanuman Temple, Bhagwan Parshuram Temple, Main Shiv Temple, Gaushala, a community centre and a sports complex.

=== Environmental work ===
Children and youth are motivated to tidy up and make important contributions to the village. The villagers are committed to develop Dattaur as a ‘Model Village’.

== Places of worship ==
- Shree Hanuman Vatika
- Main Shiv Mandir
- Hanumaan Mandir

== Healthcare ==
- Baba Sitaram Veterinary Hospital
- Baba Sitaram Primary Health Centre
- Sub health centre
- Govt Vet Hospital
- जैन धर्मार्थ औषधालय

== Location ==
The following map of Dattaur is from Google and Wikimapia. The map shows nearby villages.<iframe src="https://www.google.com/maps/embed?pb=!1m18!1m12!1m3!1d13983.318005224814!2d76.75235505595819!3d28.814154359053354!2m3!1f0!2f0!3f0!3m2!1i1024!2i768!4f13.1!3m3!1m2!1s0x390d9ef155b1abb7%3A0x3e2a2b955c94377b!2sDattaur%2C%20Haryana%20124501!5e0!3m2!1sen!2sin!4v1782031580850!5m2!1sen!2sin" width="600" height="450" style="border:0;" allowfullscreen="" loading="lazy" referrerpolicy="no-referrer-when-downgrade"></iframe>
