= Gijhi =

Coordinates: 28°49′N 76°46′E

Gijhi is a village panchayat located in the Rohtak district of the Indian state of Haryana. The old name of Gijhi is Girja Kheda founded in 816 AD . Name is changed to Gijhi from Girja Kheda in 1102 AD. It is one of the oldest villages nearby and ancestor village of Ismaila 11B, Ismaila 9B, Dattaur, Bhashru Kalan. It is 23.5 km away from district headquarters.

State capitol Chandigarh is around 251 kilometers from Gijhi.

Village	Gijhi
Block	Sampla
District	Rohtak
State	Haryana
Country	India
Continent	Asia
Time Zone	IST ( UTC + 05:30)
Currency	Indian Rupee ( INR )
Dialing Code	+91
Date format	dd/mm/yyyy
Driving side	Right
Internet country code top-level domain (cTLD)	.in
Language	Hindi, Haryanvi, Punjabi
Time difference	22 minutes
Latitude	28.8110808
Longitude	76.7737162

== Geography ==
Nearby villages are Dattaur 1.0 km, Atail 3.5 km, Ismaila - 9B 4.2 km, Ismaila - 11B 3.4 km, Kheri Sampla 4.0 km, Sampla 3.2 km, Samchana 4.5 km, Bhaisru Khurd 3.6 km, Bhaisru Kalan 4.6 km, Gandhra 4.8 km, Kisranti 5.2 km, Garhi Sampla 6.2 km, Hasangarh 8.8 km, Pakasma 8.9 km, Nonand 8.3 km, Kharawar 13.5 km, Kultana 9.5 km, Baliyana 19.2 km, Kheri Sadh 17.8 km

== Language ==
The native languages of Gijhi are Hindi, Punjabi, Haryanvi.

== Transport ==
The nearest railway station is Sampla, around 3 kilometers away.

=== Rail ===
Railway stations
Sampla railway station	3 km
Ismaila Haryana railway station	3.4 km
Kharawar railway station	13.3 km
Asaudah railway station	13.8 km
Asthal Bohar railway station	18.0 km
Delhi Jn. railway station	58.0 km
New Delhi railway station	58.4 km

=== Air ===
Gijhi's nearest airport is Indira Gandhi Domestic Airport situated at 55.1 km distance. Few more airports around Gijhi are as follows.

Airports
Airport	Distance
Indira Gandhi International Airport	62.6 km
Safdarjung Airport	65.6 km
Hindon Air Force Station	81.5 km

== Nearby centers ==
Gijhi's nearest town/city/important place is Sampla, 3.5 kilometer away.

Villages and other sites
Location	Distance
Sampla	3.5 km
Kharkhoda	16.7 km
Rohtak	23.4 km
Bahadurgarh	19.6 km
Ghevra	37.6 km

== Education ==
Schools
School	Distance
Govt Boys School Gijhi	0.0 km
Govt Girls School Gijhi	0.0 km
Maharaja Agarsen Govt Girls Sen Sec School, Sampla	3.9 km
Govt Boys High School Kheri Sampla	3.6 km
Girls Govt School Gandhra	4.7 km
Govt Girls College Sampla	4.1 km
Govt Boys College Sampla	4.1 km
Ch. Chhottu Ram Govt Polytechnic Sampla	4.1 km
