= Josephine Wairimu Kagunda =

Kenyan mathematician and epidemiologist

- Born: Kenya

Academic background
- Education: University of Nairobi; University of Lorraine (PhD)
- Thesis: Modeling of Highland Malaria in Western Kenya Highlands (2012)

Academic work
- Discipline: Applied mathematics and epidemiology
- Institutions: University of Nairobi; Ohio State University; African Women in Mathematics Association; Universal Journal of Applied Mathematics

Josephine Wairimu Kagunda is a Kenyan applied mathematician and epidemiologist. She works on developing deterministic models of infectious diseases to support the planning of effective public health interventions. She is a member, president and the chair of the African Women in Mathematics Association (AWMA) and a prominent member of the Kenya Women in Mathematical Sciences Association (KWIMSA). She is a reviewer for the international peer-reviewed journal the Universal Journal of Applied Mathematics.

== Biography ==
Kagunda grew up in a Kenyan village. Her father fundraised to enable her to study at university.

Kagunda studied her bachelor's degree at the University of Nairobi. She was awarded a PhD in Biomathematics from the University of Lorraine, France. In 2015 she was awarded an International Mathematical Union (IMU) scholarship to complete a period of research at the California State University, Northridge, Los Angeles, United States of America.

Kagunda teaches as a senior lecturer at the School of Mathematics, University of Nairobi and works with the Ohio State Health and Environment Modelling team (HEALMOD) at the College of Public Health, Ohio State University, Columbus, United States of America. She works on developing deterministic epidemiological models of infectious diseases to support the planning of effective public health interventions. She has published research on diseases including renal failure, HIV/AIDS, malaria and tuberculosis, as well as insecticide resistance. Her work has been cited in further studies on the impact of temperature in malaria disease transmission dynamics and modelling HIV/AIDS dynamics in Kenya. Kagunda has also participated in initiatives to explore the role of data-driven methodologies in pandemic modelling and control with students at specialist mathematics Cimpa Kenya School.

Kagunda is a member and the chair of the African Women in Mathematics Association (AWMA) and a member of the Kenya Women in Mathematical Sciences Association (KWIMSA). She is a reviewer for the international peer-reviewed journal the Universal Journal of Applied Mathematics.

In 2023, Kagunda presented at the SciDataCon as part of International Data Week 2023. In January 2025, Kagunda presented at the American Mathematical Society's Joint Mathematics Meetings AWM Special Session on modelling infectious disease dynamics.
