= Klaus Schmitt =

American mathematician

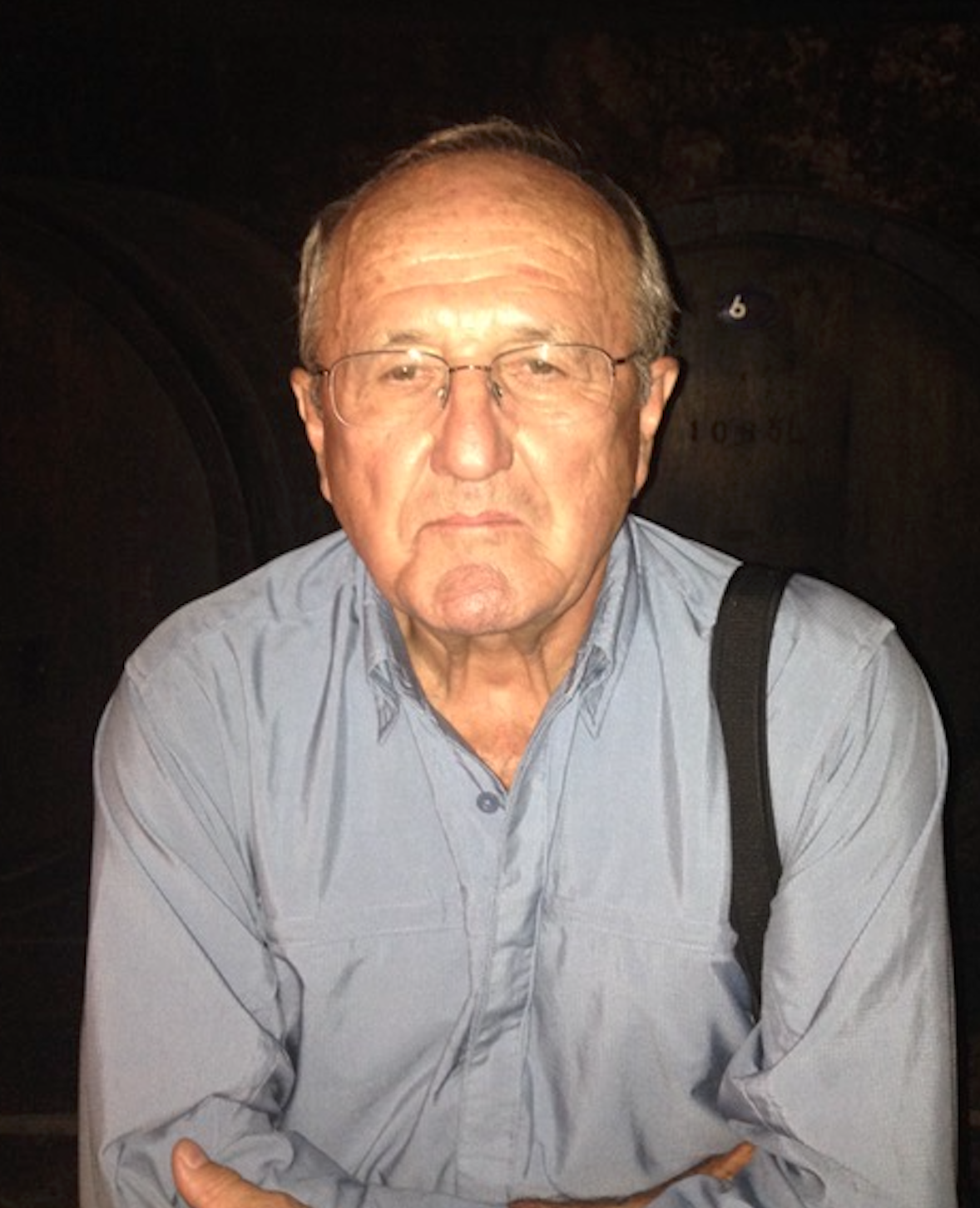
Portrait of Professor Klaus Schmitt

Klaus Schmitt (May 1940, Rimbach/Odenwald – April 2025 Mesquite, Nevada) was an American mathematician doing research in nonlinear differential equations, and nonlinear analysis.

Schmitt completed the Abitur at Rimbach's Martin-Luther-Schule in 1960. He received a BA in mathematics and physics from St. Olaf College in 1962, an MA (1964) and PhD in mathematics from the University of Nebraska in 1967. He began his 43-year career at the University of Utah in 1967, first as assistant, then associate, then as full professor of mathematics. He also served as chairman of the department of mathematics from 1989 to 1992.

Schmitt served short-term appointments as visiting professor at the University of Würzburg, University of Karlsruhe, University of Stuttgart, University Catholique de Louvain, University of Bremen, Technische Universität Berlin, University of Heidelberg, University of Kaiserslautern, University of Sydney, Universidad de Chile, Universidad Catolica de Chile, National Chengchi University in Taiwan, National Tsing Hua University in Taiwan and the Chern Institute of Mathematics in Tianjin, China.

He retired from the University of Utah as professor emeritus of mathematics in 2010.

Schmitt was awarded the Humboldt Prize in mathematics in 1978 and was honored as a University of Nebraska Distinguished Alumnus in 2000.

== Selected publications ==
- "Boundary value problems for quasilinear elliptic partial differential equations", Nonlinear Analysis, 2 (1978), 263–309.
- "Nonlinear elliptic boundary value problems versus their finite difference approximations: Numerically irrelevant solutions" (with H.O. Peitgen and D. Saupe), Journal für die reine und angewandte Mathematik (Crelle's Journal), 322 (1981), 74–117.
- "Global analysis of elliptic two parameter eigenvalue problems" (with H.O. Peitgen), Transactions of the American Mathematical Society, 283(1984), 57–95.
- "Global aspects of the discrete and continuous Newton method: A case study" (with H.O. Peitgen and M. Prüfer), Acta Applicandae Mathematicae, 13 (1988), 123–202.
- "On positive solutions of semilinear elliptic equations" (with E.N. Dancer), Proceedings of the American Mathematical Society, 101 (1987), 445–452.
- "Permanence and dynamics in biological systems" (with V. Hutson), Mathematical Biosciences, 111 (1992), 1-71.
- "Landesman-Lazer type problems at an eigenvalue of odd multiplicity" (with J. Mawhin), Results in Mathematics, 14 (1988), 138–146.
- "Positive solutions and conjugate points for systems of differential equations" (with H. Smith), Nonlinear Analysis: Theory, Methods & Applications, 2 (1978), 93–105.
- "Asymptotic behavior of positive solution branches of semilinear elliptic problems with linear part at resonance" (with R. Schaaf), Zeitschrift für Angewandte Mathematik und Physik, 43 (1992), 645–676.
- "Minimization problems for noncoercive functionals subject to constraints" (with V. K. Le), Transactions of the American Mathematical Society, 347 (1995), 4485–4513.
- Global Bifurcation in Variational Inequalities: Applications to Obstacle and Unilateral Problems (with L. K. Vy), vol 123, Applied Mathematical Sciences, Springer Verlag, New York, 1997.
- "Mountain pass type solutions of quasilinear elliptic equations" (with P. Clément, M. García-Huidobro, and R. Manásevich), Calculus of Variations and Partial Differential Equations, 11 (2000), 33–62.
- "On the existence of soliton solutions to quasilinear Schrödinger equations" (with M. Poppenberg and Z. Wang), Calculus of Variations and Partial Differential Equations, 14 (2002), 329–344.
- "The Liouville-Bratu-Gelfand problem for radial operators" (with J. Jacobsen), J. Differential Equations, 184(2002), 283–298.
- "On principal eigenvalues for quasilinear elliptic differential operators: an Orlicz-Sobolev space setting" (with M. García-Huidobro, V. Le, R. Manásevich), Nonlinear Differential Equations and Applications, 6 (1999), 207–225.
- "Radial solutions of quasilinear elliptic equations" (with J. Jacobsen), pp. 359–435 in Handbook on Differential Equations, Canada, Drabek, Fonda, editors. Elsevier, Amsterdam, 2004.
