= Babacar =

Babacar may refer to:

- Babacar (name)
- Babacar (band), a short-lived worldbeat supergroup
  - Babacar (Babacar album), a 1998 album by the band
- Babacar (France Gall album), 1987
  - "Babacar" (song), a 1987 song by France Gall
