= Sophie Dabo-Niang =

French-Senegalese mathematician

Sophie Dabo
- Born: Senegal
- Occupations: Mathematician, professor
- Children: 4

Sophie Dabo-Niang (née Dabo) is a Senegalese and French mathematician, statistician, and professor who has done outreach to increase the status of African mathematicians.

== Biography ==
=== Early life ===
Sophie was encouraged to pursue mathematics by her parents and her teachers. She knew she wanted to study mathematics early in high school.

=== Education ===
Sophie Dabo-Niang earned her PhD in 2002 from the Pierre and Marie Curie University in Paris. Sophie enjoys passing on her passion for mathematics to her students.

=== Marriage and children ===
As of 2016, Dabo-Niang is married. She had 3 children between starting her master's degree and finishing her doctoral thesis, and has 4 children in total. She has said that balancing parenting and her mathematics career has been a challenge, and she credits her persistence to her desire to succeed and the support of her husband.

== Mathematical work ==
Dabo-Niang has published articles on functional statistics, nonparametric and semi-parametric estimates of weakly independent processes, spatial statistics, and mathematical epidemiology.

Dabo-Niang serves as an editor of the journal Revista Colombiana de Estadística and is on the scientific committee of the Centre International de Mathématiques Pures et Appliquées (CIMPA).

=== Professorship and developing country outreach ===
Sophie Dabo-Niang has successfully supervised the doctoral theses of several students in Africa. As of January 2021 she is a full professor at the University of Lille and is supervising and co-supervising multiple African students. She has taught master's-level statistics courses, including in Senegal.

She introduced the spatial statistics subfields to a university in Dakar, Senegal, and supervised the first Senegalese and Mauritanian doctoral students focusing on the field. She often participates on thesis juries in Africa.

Dabo-Niang has coordinated scientific events in Africa. In Senegal, she coordinated a CIMPA event and an event to encourage young girls in the mathematical sciences. She serves as the chair of the Developing Countries Committee for the European Mathematical Society.

=== Selected publications ===
==== Books ====
- Functional and Operatorial Statistics. Contributions to Statistics. Sophie Dabo-Niang, Frédéric Ferraty (eds.). Physica-Verlag Heidelberg. 2008. ISBN 978-3-7908-2061-4.
- Mathematical Modeling of Random and Deterministic Phenomena. Solym Mawaki Mamou-Abi, Sophie Dabo-Niang, Jean-Jacques Salone (eds.). ISTE, Wiley. 2020-02-01. ISBN 978-1-78630-454-4.

==== Articles ====
- Dabo-Niang, Sophie; Rhomari, Noureddine (2003-01-01). "Estimation non paramétrique de la régression avec variable explicative dans un espace métrique". Comptes Rendus Mathematique. 336 (1): 75–80. doi:10.1016/S1631-073X(02)00012-2. ISSN 1631-073X. S2CID 122151527.
- Dabo-Niang, Sophie (2007). "Kernel Regression Estimation for Continuous Spatial Processes". Mathematical Methods of Statistics. 16 (4): 298–317. doi:10.3103/S1066530707040023. S2CID 121410227.
- Dabo-Niang, Sophie; Ferraty, Frédéric; Vieu, Philippe (2007-06-15). "On the using of modal curves for radar waveforms classification". Computational Statistics & Data Analysis. 51 (10): 4878–4890. doi:10.1016/j.csda.2006.07.012. ISSN 0167-9473.
- Chebana, Fateh; Dabo‐Niang, Sophie; Ouarda, Taha B. M. J. (2012). "Exploratory functional flood frequency analysis and outlier detection". Water Resources Research. 48 (4). Bibcode:2012WRR....48.4514C. doi:10.1029/2011WR011040. ISSN 1944-7973.
- Dabo-Niang, Sophie; Yao, Anne-Françoise (2013-01-01). "Kernel spatial density estimation in infinite dimension space". Metrika. 76 (1): 19–52. doi:10.1007/s00184-011-0374-4. ISSN 1435-926X. S2CID 121408701.

== Honours, decorations, awards and distinctions ==
The African Women in Mathematics Association has profiled Dabo-Niang. She was honored by Femmes et Mathématiques in 2015.

== See also ==
- Female education in STEM
