= Aderemi Kuku =

Nigerian mathematician and academic (1941–2022)

Professor Aderemi Oluyomi Kuku NNOM OON
- Born: 20 March 1941; Ijebu-Ode, Ogun State, Nigeria
- Died: 13 February 2022 (aged 80)
- Citizenship: Nigeria
- Education: B.Sc., M.Sc., Ph.D.
- Alma mater: Makerere University College (B.Sc.); University of Ibadan (M.Sc., Ph.D.)
- Known for: Contributions to algebraic K-theory; Work in non-commutative geometry
- Spouse: Felicia Osifunke Kalesanwo
- Children: 4
- Awards: Fellow of the African Academy of Sciences (1986); Member of the European Academy of Arts Science and Humanities (1986); Fellow of the Nigerian Academy of Science (1989); Officer of the Order of the Niger (2008); Nigerian National Order of Merit (2009); Foundation Fellow of the American Mathematical Society (2012)
- Scientific career
- Theses: A survey of Algebraic K-theory (1968); On the Whitehead group of p-adic integral group-rings of finite p-groups (1971)
- Doctoral advisors: Joshua Leslie; Hyman Bass

Aderemi Oluyomi Kuku NNOM OON (20 March 1941 – 13 February 2022) was a Nigerian mathematician and academic, known for his contributions to the fields of algebraic K-theory and non-commutative geometry. Born in Ijebu-Ode, Ogun State, Nigeria, Kuku began his academic journey at Makerere University College and the University of Ibadan, where he earned his B.Sc. in Mathematics, followed by his M.Sc. and Ph.D. under Joshua Leslie and Hyman Bass. His doctoral research focused on the Whitehead group of p-adic integral group-rings of finite p-groups. Kuku held positions as a lecturer and professor at various Nigerian universities, including the University of Ife and the University of Ibadan, where he served as Head of the Department of Mathematics and Dean of the Postgraduate School. His research involved developing methods for computing higher K-theory of non-commutative rings and articulating higher algebraic K-theory in the language of Mackey functors. His work on equivariant higher algebraic K-theory and its generalisations impacted the field.

During his career, Kuku was elected a Fellow of the African Academy of Sciences, the Nigerian Academy of Science, and the American Mathematical Society. He also received the Nigerian National Order of Merit and the Officer of the Order of the Niger. He served as president of the African Mathematical Union, where he worked to promote mathematics across Africa. Kuku's work extended beyond research, encompassing education and mentorship. He authored several books and articles, supervised graduate students, and fostered international collaborations.

== Early life and education ==
Aderemi Oluyomi Kuku was born on 20 March 1941, in Ijebu-Ode, Ogun State, Nigeria. His father Busari Adeoye Kuku was a photographer, and mother Abusatu Oriaran Baruwa was a trader. Aderemi was the third of four brothers, all of whom pursued professional careers. Kuku began his education at Bishop Oluwole Memorial School in Agege, Lagos State, and continued at St James School Anglican primary school in Oke-Odan, Ogun State. He came first in the first school leaving certificate which led to his admission to Eko Boys' High School in Lagos, Nigeria, where he served as Head Boy in his final year, 1959.

After completing his secondary education, Kuku moved to Abeokuta Grammar School to pursue his Higher School Certificate, focusing on Mathematics, Further Mathematics, and Physics. His performance earned him a scholarship from the African Scholarship Program of American Universities, administered by the United States Agency for International Development. However, he chose to attend Makerere University College in Kampala, Uganda, for his undergraduate studies.

At Makerere University College, then part of the University of East Africa and an external college of the University of London, Kuku supplemented his coursework with self-study. He graduated in 1965 with a B.Sc. in Mathematics. Upon graduation, Kuku returned to Nigeria, where he was appointed as an assistant lecturer at the University of Ife in Ile-Ife, Osun State. Despite his lecturing duties, he registered at the University of Ibadan to pursue a Master's Degree.

The University of Ibadan, established in 1948 as a College of the University of London and becoming an independent university in 1962, provided Kuku with the opportunity to delve deeper into his mathematical interests. Under the supervision of Joshua Leslie and with the external examination by Hyman Bass, Kuku submitted his M.Sc. thesis titled A survey of Algebraic K-theory, and bagged an M.Sc. in 1968.

== Academic career ==
Kuku pursued an academic career after earning his M.Sc. from the University of Ibadan. He was appointed as a Lecturer II at the University of Ife, where he began his teaching career and was later promoted in 1967. In 1968, Kuku transitioned to the University of Ibadan as a Lecturer II in Mathematics, succeeding Joshua Leslie. During this period, he married Felicia Osifunke Kalesanwo.

Kuku's tenure at the University of Ibadan was marked by a focus on his research interests. He accepted an invitation from Hyman Bass to conduct research at Columbia University in New York City. This opportunity allowed him to spend the year 1970–71 at Columbia University, where he worked with Bass and submitted his thesis On the Whitehead group of p-adic integral group-rings of finite p-groups, earning his Ph.D. in 1971. Upon his return to Nigeria, Kuku was promoted to Senior Lecturer in Mathematics in 1976, to Reader in Mathematics in 1980, and to Professor of Mathematics at the University of Ibadan in 1982.

Throughout the 1980s and 1990s, Kuku served as President of the African Mathematical Union, where he worked to establish commissions and networks to promote mathematics across the continent. He also organised the fourth Pan-African Congress of Mathematicians in Morocco in 1995, where he delivered a plenary lecture. Kuku's academic work extended beyond Nigeria. He held visiting professorships and research positions at various universities and research institutes. His international experience contributed to global mathematical discourse.

== Research contributions ==
Kuku's work in mathematics, specifically algebraic K-theory and non-commutative geometry, has linked various mathematical disciplines, aiding in the understanding of algebraic structures and their applications. His research intersects algebra, number theory, and geometry, using K-theory and cyclic homology methodologies. He formulated higher algebraic K-theory using representation theory, specifically Mackey functors. This led to the development of equivariant higher algebraic K-theory and its relative generalisations in exact and Waldhausen categories.

Kuku developed methods for computing higher K-theory of non-commutative rings, including non-commutative orders and group-rings, twisted polynomials, and Laurent series rings over orders. These methods are used in the calculations of higher K-theory of virtually infinite cyclic groups within the Farrell–Jones conjecture's context. In non-commutative geometry, Kuku's research includes entire/periodic cyclic homology and K-theory of involutive Banach algebras, C*-algebras, group C*-algebras, Hopf algebras, and quantum groups. He studied the connections between K-theory and cyclic homology of these structures.

In collaboration with M. Mahdavi-Hezavehi, Kuku studied the algebraic structure of subgroups in the group of units of a non-commutative local ring. His work with N.Q. Tho and D.N. Diep on compact Lie group C*-algebras and compact quantum groups resulted in the construction and study of non-commutative Chern characters from K-theory to entire/periodic cyclic homology. Kuku's research includes the Baum–Connes conjecture in non-commutative geometry. He formulated this conjecture for the action of quantum groups and confirmed it in specific cases, such as for quantum SU2. In addition to theoretical work, Kuku has contributed to the computational aspects of algebraic K-theory, focusing on the computation of K-groups, periodic cyclic homology, and Chern characters of various non-commutative structures.

His research has implications for other fields such as mathematical physics, dynamical systems, econometrics, and control theory, fostering collaborations across different research areas. Kuku has authored research articles, books, and monographs throughout his career. He has mentored M.Sc., M.Phil., and Ph.D. candidates, and guided postdoctoral researchers and mathematicians globally. His book Abstract Algebra, is used as a textbook for undergraduate and beginning graduate students. His advanced texts, such as "Representation Theory and Higher Algebraic K-theory," serve as resources for researchers and graduate students.

== Awards and honours ==
Kuku has received various recognition for his works and contributions. He was the recipient of the Ogun State Special Merit Award in 1987, the Officer of the Order of the Niger in 2008, and the Nigerian National Order of Merit Award in 2009. Kuku has been a fellow of different academic institutions including the African Academy of Sciences, and a member of European Academy of Arts Science and Humanities in 1986, the Nigerian Academy of Science and The World Academy of Sciences in 1989, the Mongolian Academy of Sciences in 2005, and the American Mathematical Society in 2012.

In 2011 during his 70th birthday, Kuku was honoured with an International Conference on Algebraic K-theory at Nanjing University in China. As the President of the African Mathematical Union, Kuku played a role in the establishment of networks to promote mathematics across the continent.

== Death and legacy ==
Kuku died on 13 February 2022. His work in algebraic K-theory and non-commutative geometry has influenced mathematical sciences. His research has resulted in practical tools and methodologies for future research. Kuku has focused on education and has mentored mathematicians, particularly in Africa. He has helped establish networks that support students and researchers across the continent. Kuku has guided many students academically. The Ph.D. students and postdoctoral researchers he mentored have contributed to mathematics.

Kuku's work has been recognised in conferences and special journal issues. Kuku has advocated for the application of mathematics to solve real-world problems. Kuku has written numerous publications and articles, which are often cited and used as references in mathematical research. Kuku's efforts to advance mathematics in Africa have impacted the continent's academic landscape. His work has raised the profile of African mathematics and encouraged international collaboration and recognition. Kuku's legacy includes his academic work, his role as a mentor and educator, and his influence on the development of mathematical sciences in Africa and beyond.

== Selected publications ==
- ——— (2016). Representation Theory and Higher Algebraic K-Theory. Chapman & Hall/CRC Pure and Applied Mathematics. CRC Press. ISBN 978-1-4200-1112-8. Archived from the original on 21 May 2024.
- ——— (1987). "Some finiteness results in the higher K-theory of orders and group-rings". Topology and Its Applications. 25 (2). Elsevier BV: 185–191. doi:10.1016/0166-8641(87)90013-7. ISSN 0166-8641.
- ———; Tang, Guoping (1 April 2003). "Higher K -theory of group-rings of virtually infinite cyclic groups". Mathematische Annalen. 325 (4): 711–726. doi:10.1007/s00208-002-0397-2. ISSN 0025-5831.
- ——— (1982). "Higher algebraic k-theory of group-rings and orders in algebras over number fields". Communications in Algebra. 10 (8): 805–816. doi:10.1080/00927878208822751. ISSN 0092-7872.
- ——— (1999). "Ranks of Kn and Gn of orders and group rings of finite groups over integers in number fields". Journal of Pure and Applied Algebra. 138 (1). Elsevier BV: 39–44. doi:10.1016/s0022-4049(98)00010-3. ISSN 0022-4049.
- ——— (10 June 2006). "Finiteness of Higher K-Groups of Orders and Group Rings". K-Theory. 36 (1–2): 51–58. doi:10.1007/s10977-005-3120-8.
- ——— (1 February 1973). "Some algebraic $K$-theoretic applications of the ${\rm LF}$ and ${\rm NF}$ functors". Proceedings of the American Mathematical Society. 37 (2). American Mathematical Society (AMS): 363. doi:10.1090/s0002-9939-1973-0314826-x. ISSN 0002-9939.
- ———; Guo, Xuejun (9 March 2005). "Higher Class Groups of Generalized Eichler Orders". Communications in Algebra. 33 (3): 709–718. doi:10.1081/AGB-200049878. ISSN 0092-7872.
