= Omafume Onoge =

Nigerian professor of sociology (1938–2009)

Omafume Friday Onoge
- Born: 21 October 1938; Uvwie Kingdom, Delta State, Nigeria
- Died: 12 July 2009 (aged 70)
- Occupations: Sociologist; social anthropologist; social activist
- Years active: 1961 – 2009

Omafume Friday Onoge (21 October 1938 – 12 July 2009) was a Nigerian professor of sociology and social anthropology as well as an activist.

== Early life ==
Onoge was born on 21 October 1938 in Uvwie, a local government area of Delta State, southern Nigeria. He attended St. Andrew’s C.M.S. School in Warri and in 1952, he was admitted into Urhobo College at Effurun, where he obtained the West African School Certificate in 1957. He later attended the Moore Plantation at Ibadan for a three-year agricultural superintendent course, and in 1961 he was a recipient of an undergraduate scholarship from the African Scholarship Program of American Universities (ASPAU). Onoge was subsequently accepted and admitted into Macalester College, St Paul, Minnesota, where he completed his undergraduate courses within two years, between 1961 and 1963. He received a Bachelor of Arts (B.A.) degree in sociology and was on the Dean’s honour list throughout his undergraduate studies at the university.

In 1963, he was admitted into Harvard University, where he received a Master of Arts (M.A.) and was later awarded a doctorate degree (Ph.D) in anthropology in 1970.

== Career ==
Onoge lectured at several universities in the United States, among them Harvard University, Macalester College, and the University of Massachusetts. He also lectured at the University of Dar es Salaam in Tanzania, and in Nigeria at the University of Ibadan, where he also served as warden for two years, between 1970 and 1972. He was appointed a professor and chair of the sociology department in 1982 at the University of Jos, where he also served as dean in the School of Postgraduate Studies, director of the Centre for Development Studies, and chairman of the board and elected senate member of the Council of the University and University Orator. Onoge retired on 20 October 2003 from the University of Jos. He served as Member of the Federal Government Delegation to the People's Republic of China in 1976 in the area of Youth Affairs.

== See also ==
- Ola Oni
