= Diederich Hinrichsen =

German mathematician

- Born: 17 February 1939; Nürnberg, Germany
- Citizenship: German
- Education: University of Erlangen
- Known for: Contributions for the systems theory
- Scientific career
- Fields: Mathematics
- Workplaces: Universidad Carlos III de Madrid

Diederich Hinrichsen (born 17 February 1939) is a German mathematician who, together with Hans W. Knobloch, established the field of dynamical systems theory and control theory in Germany.

== Life and work ==
Diederich Hinrichsen was born in 1939, and studied mathematics, physics, literature, philosophy, and economics from 1958 to 1965 in Hamburg.

In 1966 he got his PhD at the University of Erlangen under the supervision of Heinz Bauer. His main research area at that time was abstract potential theory, with a special focus on extensions of the Cauchy-Weil theorem to the Choquet boundary. After research visits in Paris and Hamburg, he went to Havana where he helped to re-establish mathematics in Cuba. After an appointment to Bielefeld, he became professor of mathematics at the University of Bremen.

Hinrichsen was the founding director of the Research Center for Dynamical Systems, concentrating on finite- and infinite-dimensional linear systems, stochastic dynamical systems, nonlinear dynamics and stability analysis.

He focused on algebraic systems theory, parameterization problems in control and linear algebra, infinite-dimensional systems, and stability analysis, developing a comprehensive theory of linear systems. In a different direction, with Anthony J. Pritchard (University of Warwick), he worked on concepts of stability radii and spectral value sets, building up a robustness theory covering deterministic and stochastic aspects of dynamical systems.

After retiring in Germany, he is now a professor at Carlos III in Madrid.

== Selected publications ==
- 1982. Feedback Control of Linear and Nonlinear Systems, with Alberto Isidori. Heidelberg : Springer. ISBN 3-540-11749-0
- 1990. Control of Uncertain Systems. Progress in Systems & Control Theory, with Bengt Martensson. Boston : Birkhäuser. ISBN 0-8176-3495-9
- 1999. Advances in Mathematical Systems Theory. In Honor of Diederich Hinrichsen, Boston : Birkhäuser ISBN 0-8176-4162-9
- 2005. Mathematical Systems Theory, with A. J. Pritchard. Heidelberg : Springer ISBN 978-3-540-44125-0
