= Nyakim Gatwech =

Instagram model

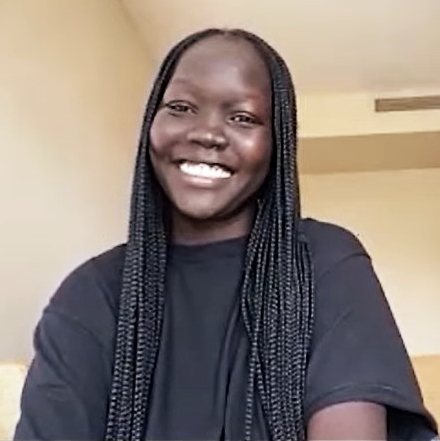
- Gatwech in 2020
- Born: January 27, 1993 (age 33); Gambela, Ethiopia
- Modeling information
- Height: 6 ft 1 in (185 cm)
- Website: Instagram

Nyakim Gatwech (born January 27, 1993) is an Ethiopian-American model of South Sudanese descent. She has attracted attention for her dark skin color and has achieved significant popularity on Instagram.

== Education ==
Before Nyakim Gatwech started her modelling career, she was a student of St. Cloud State University, where she studied nursing. It was during her university days that she started her fashion modelling career.

== Biography ==
Nyakim Gatwech's parents lived in Maiwut, South Sudan, before they fled due to the Second Sudanese Civil War to Gambela, Ethiopia, where Gatwech was born. From there, the family migrated to Kenya where they lived in refugee camps until they migrated to the US when Gatwech was 14 years old. Originally settling in Buffalo, New York, Gatwech later moved to Minneapolis, Minnesota. Although she has never been to South Sudan, Gatwech considers herself to be South Sudanese. She considered a modeling career after taking part in a fashion show at St. Cloud State University. She has appeared in promotional posters for the 2017 film Jigsaw.

== Social media ==
Gatwech is known for her naturally dark skin color and has gained the nickname "Queen of Dark". Gatwech has faced self-esteem issues and comments from people who promote bleaching to lighten skin color. She has over 985,000 followers on Instagram.

== See also ==
- Khoudia Diop
