= Sylvie Paycha =

French mathematician

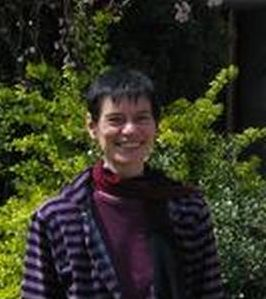
- Born: 27 March 1960 (age 66); Neuilly-sur-Seine, France

Academic background
- Education: University of Bochum

Academic work
- Discipline: mathematics mathematical physics
- Doctoral students: Marie Françoise Ouedraogo

Sylvie Paycha (born 27 March 1960 in Neuilly-sur-Seine) is a French mathematician and mathematical physicist working in operator theory as a professor at the University of Potsdam. She has chaired both European Women in Mathematics and L'association femmes et mathématiques.

== Education ==
She completed her PhD thesis at the University of Bochum, Germany in 1988. Her doctoral advisor was Sergio Albeverio.

== Selected publications ==
- Albeverio, Sergio; Jost, Jürgen; Paycha, Sylvie; Scarlatti, Sergio (1997), A mathematical introduction to string theory, London Mathematical Society Lecture Note Series, vol. 225, Cambridge: Cambridge University Press, doi:10.1017/CBO9780511600791, ISBN 0-521-55610-4
- Paycha, Sylvie (2012), Regularised integrals, sums and traces, University Lecture Series, vol. 59, Providence, RI: American Mathematical Society, doi:10.1090/ulect/059, ISBN 978-0-8218-5367-2
