= Mamadou Diop =

Mamadou Diop may refer to:

- Mamadou Diop (politician) (1936–2018), Senegalese politician and former Mayor of Dakar
- Mamadou Diop (musician) (born 1954), Senegalese musician
- Mamadou Diop (basketball, born 1955), Senegalese basketball player at the 1980 Summer Olympics
- Mamadou Diop (basketball, born 1993), Senegalese basketball player
- Mamadou Diop (footballer) (born 2000), Mauritanian footballer
