= Khoudia Diop =

Senagalese model

- Born: Khoudia Diop; 31 December 1996 (age 28); Senegal
- Occupations: Model; Actress
- Modeling information
- Height: 173 cm (5 ft 8 in)
- Hair color: Black
- Eye color: Black

Khoudia Diop, also known as the Melanin Goddess, (born 31 December 1996) is a Senegalese fashion model and actress.

== Early life ==
Khoudia Diop was teased as a child because of her dark skin tone, but after moving to Paris at age 15, she was repeatedly approached by photographers with the suggestion that she become a model. Initially, Khoudia was not interested because she wanted to get an education first and was scared because she did not know what she was getting into.

She nicknamed herself the "Melanin Goddess" (alluding her dark black skin) to express pride in her appearance.

== Career ==
Khoudia officially started modeling at the age of 17, with the goal of changing perceptions of "beauty" in the beauty industry by encouraging people to be confident in their appearance, especially by becoming a source of inspiration for young girls. "I want to inspire young girls and let them know that we are all goddesses inside and out."

In 2016 she moved to New York City for college and became popular on Instagram because of what was described as her "unique and beautiful look". She went from 300 to 350,000 followers on Instagram in only days. In 2017 she appeared in an advertising campaign for French cosmetics brand Make Up For Ever.

== See also ==
- Nyakim Gatwech
