= Pan-African Congress of Mathematicians =

The Pan-African Congress of Mathematicians (PACOM) is an international congress of mathematics, held under the auspices of the African Mathematical Union.

== List of congresses ==
- 2022 – Brazzaville, Republic of Congo
- 2017 – Rabat, Morocco
- 2013 – Abuja, Nigeria
- 2009 – Yamoussoukro, Ivory Coast
- 2004 – Tunis, Tunisia
- 2000 – Cape Town, South Africa
- 1995 – Ifrane, Morocco
- 1991 – Nairobi, Kenya
- 1986 – Jos, Nigeria
- 1976 – Rabat, Morocco
