= Asaudha =

Asaudah Asaudah, Jhajjar
- Village
- Location in Haryana, India Asaudah (India)
- Country: India
- State: Haryana
- Region: North India
- District: Jhajjar

Languages
  - Official: Hindi
- Time zone: UTC+5:30 (IST)
- ISO 3166 code: IN-HR
- Vehicle registration: HR-14
- Website: haryana.gov.in

Asaudha (also known as Asoudha) is a village located in Jhajjar district in the Indian state of Haryana. Asoudha Siwan and Asoudha Todran are nearby villages.

== Religion ==
Most of the residents are Hindu, with Brahmans being the dominant social group. Dada Budha Mandir is a temple frequented by pilgrims in bhadrapad mas.
