= Mamadou Niang (disambiguation) =

Mamadou Niang (born 1979) is a Senegalese former footballer.

Mamadou Niang may also refer to:

- Mamadou Niang (basketball) (born 1994), Senegalese basketball player
- Mamadou Niang (military officer), Senegalese military officer
- Mamadou Niang (politician), Senegalese politician
