= Ismaila Sanyang =

Gambian politician

Ismaila Sanyang is the current Agricultural Minister of The Gambia. He was appointed 5 January 2016. He was promoted from deputy minister.
