= Ismaila, Rohtak =

Village in the Rohtak District, Haryana, India

Ismaila is an old village in Rohtak district, Haryana, India. Founded by Khatri gotra jaats. The current Sarpanch is Shri Dheeraj Khatri.

== Politics ==
There are two panchayats in the village, 9-B And 11-B. It is an Adrash Village in the RTK District and Sitatude at National Highway No. 9 near Sampla On Delhi Rohtak Haryana.

== Facilities ==
The villages facilities include railway station and a big stadium, five government schools (three are primary and two are high schools), two Nahar water supplies for farms and drinking water pipe line in every house, S.B.I and Andhra Banks, and animal hospital. Government Civil Hospital is near Chatru School and Surte School.But students number is very low.

== Sports ==
There have been an international Boxer in Ismaila Village, sanbeer Khatri. He had Taken Boxing Training from his own Village in the year 2005. Sanbeer Khatri is Student of Boxing coach Anil Dhankhar. Sanbeer Khatri Has Completed Boxing Coaching Diploma From Patiala2018-19.

== Nearby villages ==
- Dattaur - 3 km from Sampla, Rohtak
- Gijhi
- Gandhra
- Atayal
- Sampla
- Chuliana
- Kultana
- Barhana
