= Issa Diop =

Issa Diop may refer to:

- Issa (Senegalese singer), born Issa Diop, singer, songwriter, and record producer
- Issa Diop (footballer) (born 1997), Moroccan footballer
- Issa Rae, born Jo-Issa Rae Diop, actress, writer, and producer.
