= African Women in Mathematics Association =

Professional society

- Formation: July 19, 2013
- Type: Professional organization
- Members: 300
- Official language: French and English
- President: Marie Françoise Ouedraogo
- Website: africanwomeninmath.org

The African Women in Mathematics Association (AWMA) is a professional society whose mission is to promote mathematics to African women and girls, to support women's careers in mathematics, to create equal opportunity and equal treatment in the African mathematical community, and to create a meeting place for African mathematical women. The AWMA was founded in 2013. AWMA has approximately 300 members from over 30 countries and from all regions of Africa. It hosts events to encourage African girls' participation in mathematics.

== History ==
In 1986, the African Mathematical Union founded the commission on women and mathematics (AMUCWMA). At the AMUCWMA's 2012 conference in Ouagadougou, which drew over 70 attendees, a panel on the state of women in mathematics in Africa was held. The panel's primary recommendation was to create an association for African female mathematicians. The AWUCWMA held another conference soon after in July 2013 in Cape Town. One of the primary objectives of the conference was to form an association for African women in mathematics. On July 19, 2013, at the conference, the African Women in Mathematics Association was officially formed. The primary objective was "the promotion of female mathematicians in Africa and the promotion of mathematics among girls and women in Africa".

The first AWMA conference was held in July 2015 in Naivasha, Kenya. The topic of the conference was Women in Mathematics for Social Change and Sustainable Livelihoods. Starting in October 2020, the association has hosted virtual seminars due to the COVID-19 pandemic. The first of these seminars was hosted by Aissa Wade on complex contact structures and Jacobi manifolds.

The AWMA has collaborated with the African Mathematical Union, the Centre International de Mathématiques Pures et Appliquées, and European Women in Mathematics. They created their website in 2015, with assistance from the Women in Mathematics committee of the International Mathematical Union.

In coordination with other women's mathematics organizations, the AWMA celebrates women in mathematics during the May 12 Initiative. The date was chosen for Maryam Mirzakhani's birthday.

== Organization ==
At the organization's formation, Marie Françoise Ouedraogo was elected president; Joséphine Guidy Wandja the vice president of Western Africa; Rebecca Walo Omana the Vice President of Central Africa; Schehrazad Selmane the Vice President of Northern Africa; Yirgalem Tsegaye the Vice President of Eastern Africa; and Sibusiso Moyo the Vice President of Southern Africa. The group is a nonprofit organization. Decisions are made by simple majority, and constitutional changes are made by 2/3 majority. A general meeting is held at least once every two years.

The organization lists its purpose as:

- To encourage African women to take up and continue their studies in mathematics and to promote mathematics among women.
- To support African women with or desiring careers in research in mathematics or Mathematics related fields.
- To provide a meeting place for these women.
- To foster international scientific communications among African women within and across fields in mathematics.
- To promote equal opportunity and equal treatment of women and men in the African Mathematical community.
- To increase access of African women to socio-economic benefits of mathematics.
- To increase access of African women to grants.
- To provide mentorship of African female students in primary, secondary, and tertiary institutions at both the undergraduate and postgraduate levels.
- To promote participation of AWMA in the development of Africa.
- To cooperate with groups and organizations with similar goals.
- To promote cooperation and exchange of ideas in mathematics research and teaching of mathematics.
- To stimulate communication between women in mathematics in Africa.
- To organize research seminars and colloquia in mathematics in Africa.
- To promote visits to Africa of eminent women and men in mathematics from other continents and organize interdepartmental visits and exchange visits.
- To promote visits to African countries of eminent women and men in mathematics from Africa and the African diaspora.
- To seek and maintain contacts with other mathematics associations within and outside the Africa, provided that the objectives and purposes of such other associations are consistent with the objectives and purposes of the association.
- To produce a research and information publication and any other publications deemed to be of value in the promotion of the above objectives.
- To endow prizes and awards in mathematics.
- To carry out any, do, or transact any act, scheme, or enterprise calculated to further the objectives of the Association.

== See also ==
- African Mathematical Union
- History of mathematics in Africa
- List of women in mathematics
- Marie Françoise Ouedraogo
