= Ismaïla Sy =

French basketball player

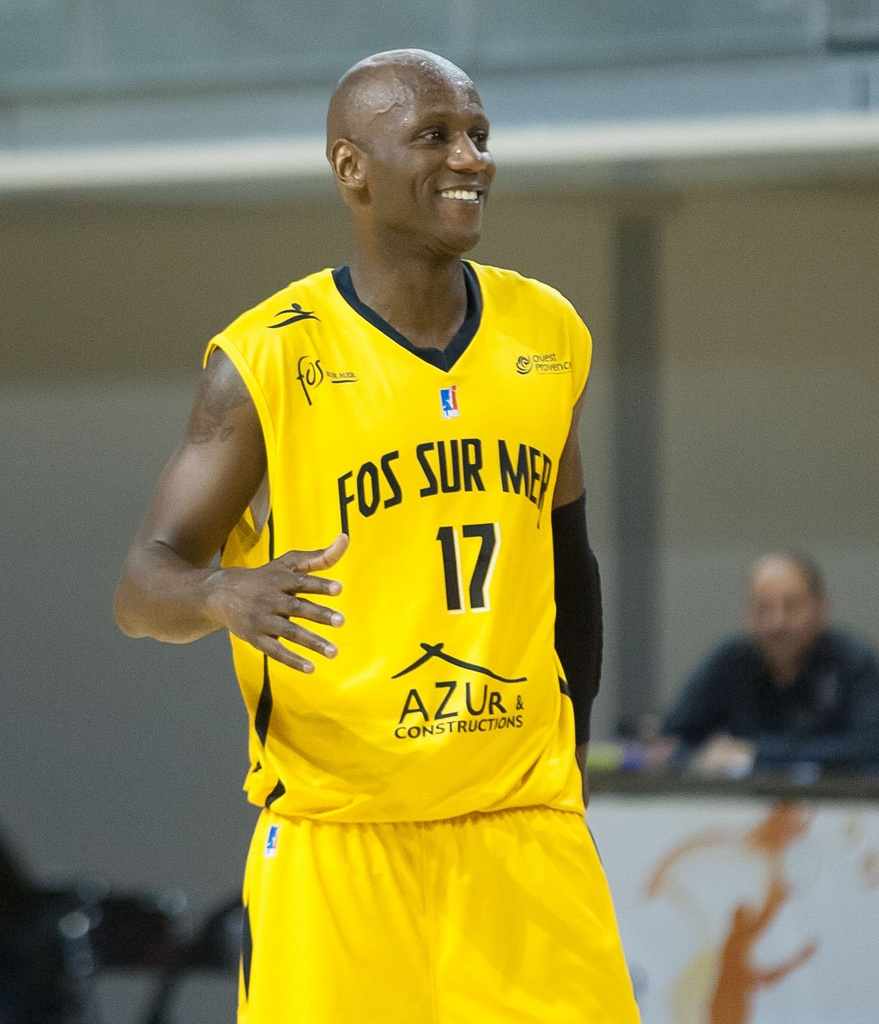
Ismaïla Sy (2014)

Ismaïla Sy (born May 29, 1979 in Versailles. France) is a French basketball player who played for French Pro A league clubs Nancy during 2003-2004 season, Brest during 2005-2006 season and Hyeres-Toulon during 2007-2008 season.
