= Ola Oni =

Nigerian marxist political economist and activist

- Born: 1933 present day Ekiti State, Nigeria
- Died: December 22, 1999 (aged 65–66); Ibadan
- Occupations: Political economist, socialist and human right activist, Lecturing
- Spouse: Kehinde Ola

Ola Oni (1933–1999) was a Nigerian marxist political economist, socialist and human right activist. He served as a lecturer at the University of Ibadan. He was the subject of a biographical book by Ebenezer Babatope, titled Student Power in Nigeria (1991).

== Early life ==
The anti-military and pro-democracy, Ola Oni hails from Ekiti State southwestern Nigeria where he was born but based in Ibadan, the capital of Oyo State, Nigeria. He was a lecturer at the University of Ibadan but was sacked due to his radicalism. Ebenezer Babatope's book, "Student Power in Nigeria" (1956-198), tells the life of Ola Oni. He died on December 22, 1999, at the University College Hospital, Ibadan. After his demise, he was immortalized and a social research center, Comrade Ola Oni Centre For Social Research was named after him.

== Personal life ==
He was married to Kehinde Ola Oni, a retired civil servant and fellow activist who is now blind.

== See also ==
- Omafume Onoge
- Ayo Fasanmi
