= Babacar Khane =

Senegalese yogi

Babacar Khane (born January 2, 1935), also known as Yogi Khane, Yogi Babacar Khane and Maître Khane, is a practitioner of yoga, author, and mystical poet. His work has focused on the diffusion of yoga in Europe and its introduction into medical treatments. He founded the International Yoga Institute and an international yoga teacher training school, active now in Africa, America, Asia and Europe. He introduced a new way of teaching yoga based on Indian Hatha yoga asanas, Egyptian postures and Chinese exercises attributed by the Shaolin monks to Bodhidharma. He is one proponent of "Egyptian yoga", a branch of yoga based on the observation of the ancient-Egyptian art.

== Biography ==
Khane was born in Dakar, into a Sufi family. He learned yoga at an early age and became a disciple of Paramahansa Yogananda. He founded the first center of the International Yoga Institute (or Institut International de Yoga) in Dakar, in 1960. In 1964, he was invited by Philippe Baumgartner, a French gerontologist and author of several books (among them, L'Homme et son Âge, Julliard, Paris, 1959; and 101 Conseils pour retrouver et développer la mémoire, Hachette, Paris, 1976, ISBN 2-01-002324-2) to take part with him in several international medical conferences in order to explain and show how yoga might be helpful against the ageing process. In 1965, Baumgartner asked him to collaborate with him in the treatment of his rheumatic patients in Aix-les-Bains. Both organised later an annual course of treatment in Gorée. This collaboration lasted until the death of Baumgartner in 1980 and was very important for the genesis of the therapeutic and preventive yoga method created by Khane. Baumgartner introduced Khane in several important European yoga schools and federations who invited him soon to give often seminars and hatha-yoga demonstrations. In 1972, he opened his first yoga teacher training school in Switzerland. In 1974, he became a member of the pedagogic committee of the Fédération Française de Yoga (called now the FNEY). In 1978, he decided to leave this Federation and devote himself entirely to the development of the International Yoga Institute in Europe, Africa and America. His yoga school now has branches in many countries throughout the world.

== Khane's teaching method ==
When he began to introduce yoga in the treatment of Baumgartner's old and rheumatic patients, Khane had to adapt his teaching to the limited abilities of this new audience. For pedagogic reasons, he decided to introduce into his hatha-yoga lessons some Chinese exercises based on the inner style (Nei Shia) of the kung-fu method attributed to the Indian Buddhist monk Bodhidharma. He used in addition some postures depicted in the temples of ancient Egypt, which he calls "Egyptian yoga".

== Khane and Egyptian yoga ==
An Egyptian attitude, Dendera Temple.

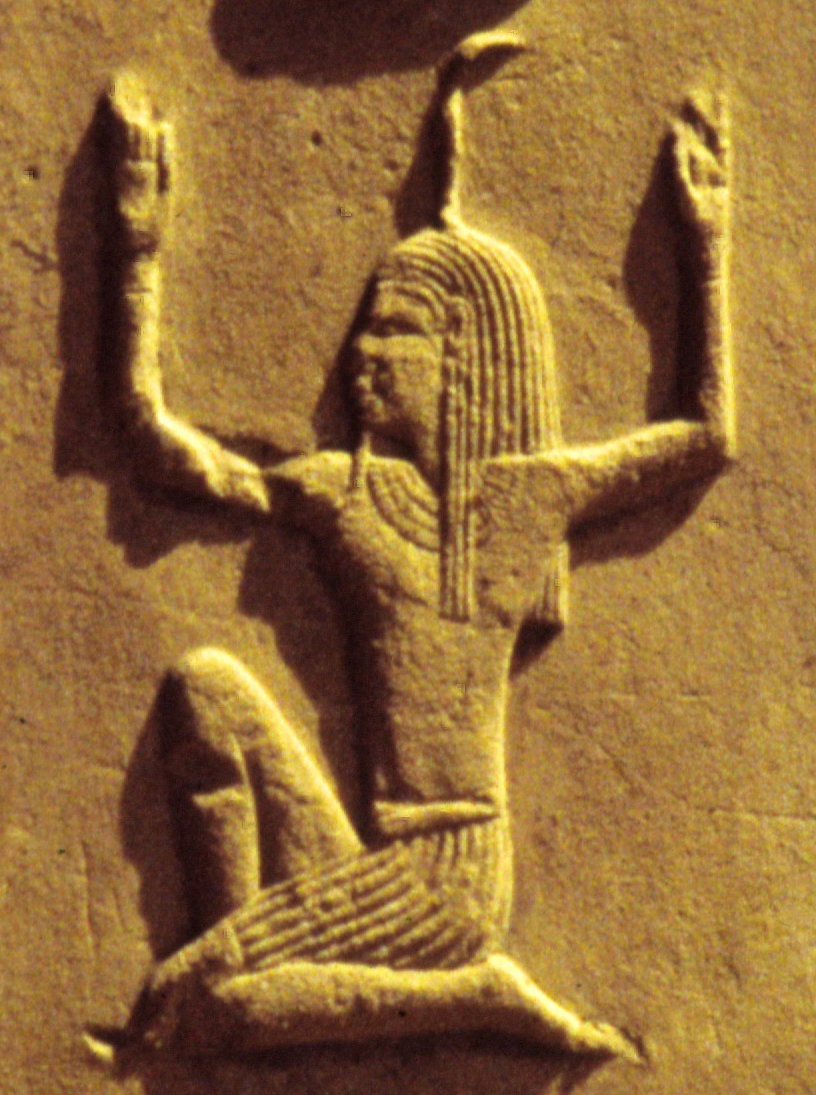
The deity Heh, symbol of eternity, Karnak, White Chapel of Senusret I.

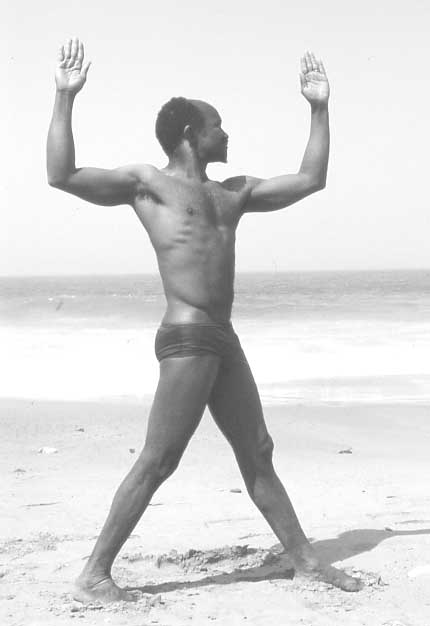
Khane reproducing the hieroglyph qꜣ (A28) and the attitude of god Shu.

Khane wrote several books about "Egyptian yoga". He claimed in those books that some hatha-yoga asanas were practised in ancient Egypt. Khane claims in addition that other poses represented in Egyptian temples and graves had similar effects to the Indian one and could be considered as yoga postures. As Khane mentions himself, some "Egyptian" postures had been taught in the past by Hanish (Mazdanan, 1932), and A. de Sambucy, who wrote in the sixties the book Le Yoga irano-égyptien. Khane built a complete pedagogic system based on the Egyptian bas-reliefs and paintings, and studied the similarities between some Egyptian words or pharaonic symbols and Indian yogic concepts. He proposes to see in Pharao a model of the human realization.
The assertion made by Khane in many of his books, lectures, interviews and articles is that signs of the existence of yoga appear at approximately the same time in India and Egypt, and that the two traditions are very close, but parallel. For Khane, yoga is a universal legacy kept in life and passed down to humanity through generations by India, despite the fact that it is possible to find numerous traces of yoga in Ancient Egypt and perhaps in a few Judaeo-Christian or Islamic practices. For him what is important in the fact that yoga was practiced in Egypt, is that it is a link between several spiritual traditions and a factor of unity for humanity.
The idea that yoga was practised in Ancient Egypt is now accepted by several European writers specialized in the study of the spirituality. Khane is generally accepted by other yoga schools as one of the main exponents of Egyptian yoga. Davina Delor writes : "Babacar Khane est le maître contemporain révélateur du Yoga des Pharaons." Gérard Blitz, former General Secretary of the European Union of National Yoga Federations (UEFNY, called now European Union of Yoga) credits him with having found the traces of the Egyptian yoga "Es este hombre que se interesa al Yoga Egipcio, Yoga de el que él su esposa han vuelto a encontrar huellas en una civilización antigua de al menos seis mil anos (ver su libro : "El Yoga de los Faraones" and asked him to conduct several international yogic trips (1987, 1989, 1991) to Egypt under the patronage of the European Union of National Yoga Federations.
In Africa, Senghor in one of his official speeches, called upon Senegalese youth and athletes to return beyond Greece to their Egyptian roots, following the path opened by Khane.

== International recognition ==
An "internationally recognized" master, Khane has been selected as member of the World Yoga Council. The Institut International de Yoga is a member of the International Yoga Federation and the European Yoga Alliance. Khane is regularly invited to perform yoga and give lectures or yoga lessons in international Yoga conferences throughout the world. Since 1973, he has participated many times in the annual conference organized in Zinal by the European Union of Yoga.
Gérard Blitz, important person in the field of yoga, wrote about him : "hombre cuya sola presencia es sugestiva, un Sabio auténtico."
From 1978 to 1988, his yoga lessons were broadcast daily on Radio Télévision Sénégalaise (RTS). Several European TV channels (for example La Deuxième Chaîne, called now France 2, 1972) invited him to take part in programmes about yoga or interviewed him (Algerian TV channel, Spanish and Greek TV channels).
On the request of an Algerian Minister, Abdelmadjid Aouchiche, Director of DNC and former Dr Baumgartner's patient, Khane was asked by the Algerian state (though communist at this time) to introduce yoga in Algeria while training a team of yoga teachers, from 1978 to 1982.

Khane's work and finds in the domain of Egyptian yoga are presented as reference in several academic publications.

Several books and articles by other European yoga teachers are based expressly on Khane's teaching.

== Khane's poetic work ==
Khane is considered by Marie-Madeleine Davy, a specialist of the French medieval mystical theology, as "hijo digno de los poetas soufis".

== Publications ==
- Invitation au Yoga. Preface by Robert Linnsen.
- Le Yoga de la Parole, Editions de l'Etoile, Bruxelles.
- Prières et poèmes pour vivre et danser, Editions Aux Sources du Présent, Genève, 1976, Preface by Marie-Madeleine Davy.
- Le Yoga de la Prière. Preface by Gérard Blitz.
- Yoga por la Palabra. Plegarias y Poemas para Vivir y Danzar, Prefacio de Marie-Madeleine Davy, Editorial Biblioteca Nueva, 1977, Madrid ISBN 84-7030-260-4.
- El Yoga de la Plegaria, Prefacio de Gérard Blitz, Secretari General de la Union Europea de la s Federaciones Nacionales de Yoga, Hogar del Libro, Madrid, ISBN 978-84-398-7813-1
- Yogis Geneviève and Babacar Khane, Le Yoga des pharaons, Dervy, Paris, 1st edition 1983 (ISBN 978-2850761638), 2nd edition : 1998 ISBN 978-2-84454-554-1
- Geneviève and Babacar Khane, Le Yoga de la Verticalité, Pédagogie et pratique du Yoga des pharaons, Dervy, Paris, 1984, ISBN 978-2-85076-039-6.
- Geneviève and Babacar Khane, Pharaonisches Yoga.
- Geneviève and Babacar Khane, Yoga Egipcio, Pedagogia y practica del yoga de los faraones, Mandala Ediciones, Madrid, 2002, ISBN 978-84-95052-86-5

== Articles ==
- Babacar Khane, "Le Yoga égyptien", Ethiopiques n 27, Dakar, 1981.
- Geneviève Khane, "La redécouverte du yoga égyptien", Notes Africaines, IFAN, Dakar, N° 175, juillet 1982, p. 59–73.
- Geneviève and Babacar Khane,"Silence and Wisdom in Ancient Egypt", Yoga & Health, formerly Yoga Today, January 1990, UK, p. 34–37.
- Geneviève and Babacar Khane,"Yoga in ancient Egypt", Yoga & Health, formerly Yoga Today, February 1990, vol. 14 N° 10, UK.
- Geneviève and Babacar Khane,"Movements of the eagle & Ka posture", Yoga & Health, formerly Yoga Today, June 1990, Vol. 15 N° 2, UK.
- Yogis Geneviève and Babacar Khane, "Yoga égyptien et universalité du yoga", Santé Yoga, n° 86, July–August 2008, p. 12–13.
- "Egyptian Yoga : a millenary practice for modern man"
- Entrevista por Paloma Corridor, fotos por Thor CastroYoga Journal Espana, N° 21, p. 92–94.
