= Acta Applicandae Mathematicae =

- Discipline: Applied mathematics
- Language: English
- Edited by: John King, Benoît Perthame, and Irene Fonseca

Publication details
- History: 1983–present
- Publisher: Springer
- Frequency: Triannual
- Impact factor: 1.215 (2020)

Standard abbreviations
- ISO 4: Acta Appl. Math.

Indexing
- CODEN: AAMADV
- ISSN: 0167-8019 (print); 1572-9036 (web)
- LCCN: 83646887
- OCLC no.: 09710183

Links
- Journal homepage

Acta Applicandae Mathematicae is a peer-reviewed mathematics journal published by Springer. Founded in 1983, the journal publishes articles on applied mathematics.

The journal is indexed by Mathematical Reviews and Zentralblatt MATH. According to the Journal Citation Reports, the journal has a 2020 impact factor of 1.215. According to SCImago Journal Rank (SJR), the journal h-index is 45, ranking it to Q2 in Applied Mathematics.
