= Marie Françoise Ouedraogo =

Burkinabé mathematician

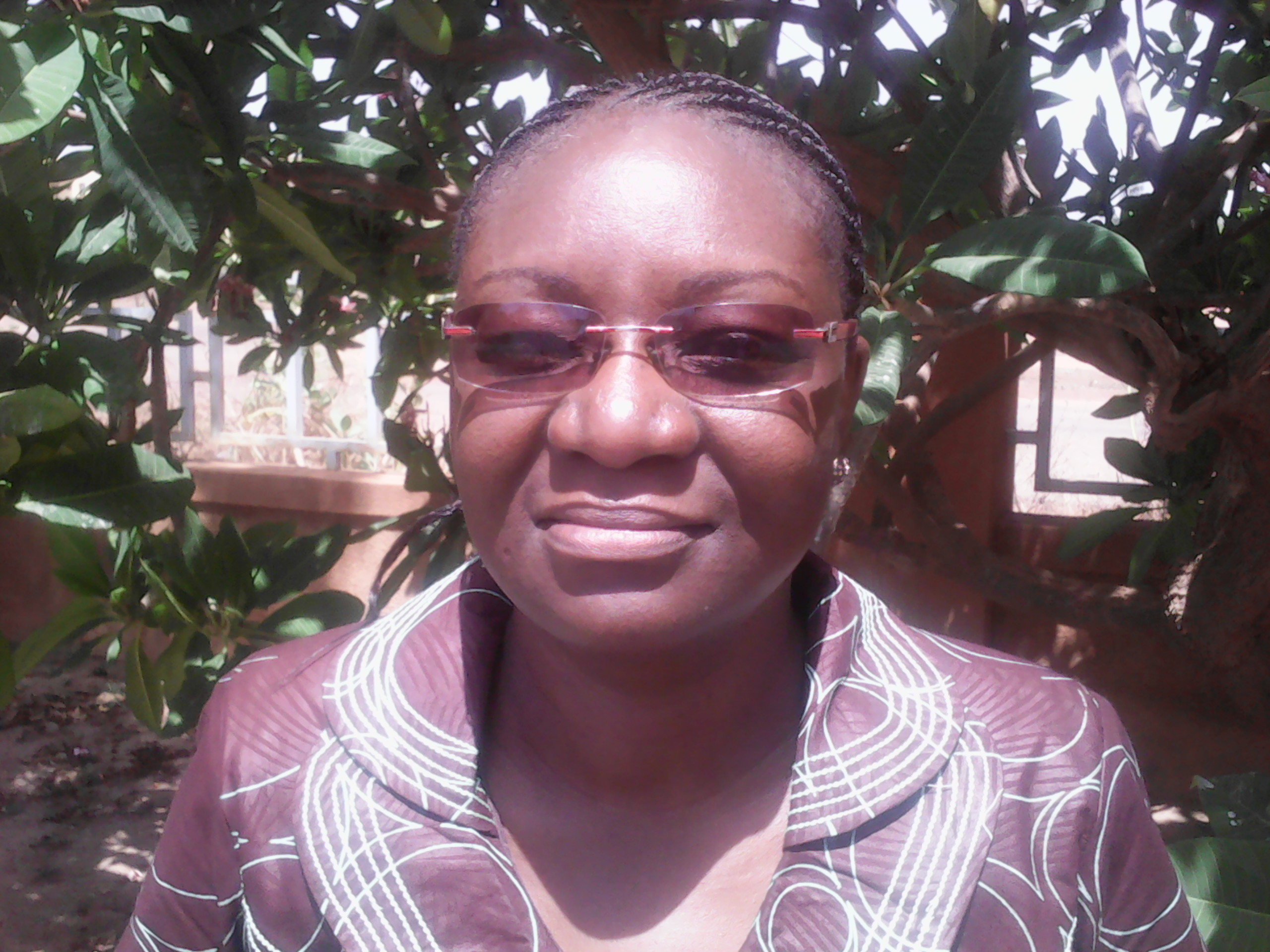
Marie Françoise Ouedraogo in 2016

Marie Françoise Ouedraogo (born 3 December 1967) is the first woman from Burkina Faso to earn a doctorate in mathematics. She is an Assistant Professor at the department of Mathematics of University of Ouagadougou, Burkina Faso She has previously served in government as permanent secretary of the national policy of good governance.

== Biography ==
Born in December 1967, Ouedraogo was raised in Ouagadougou. She was drawn to the study of mathematics at a young age as she received good grades without putting forth much effort. She was educated at the University of Ouagadougou, where she wrote her first thesis (Doctorat de 3ème cycle) on Lie superalgebras in 1999. Akry Koulibaly served as her doctoral adviser. From 2005 to 2008 Ouedraogo served as the permanent secretary of the national policy of good governance. She was committed to ending forms of corruption, especially in the realm of public transport. According to her, good governance is a state of mind. She then prepared a Ph.D. thesis at Blaise Pascal University of Clermont-Ferrand in France under the co-direction of Sylvie Paycha and Akry Koulibaly. Her Ph.D. thesis was about pseudodifferential operators and was accepted in 2009. Ouedraogo is the first Burkinabé woman who defended a thesis in mathematics.

Ouedraogo teaches in the Mathematics Department of the University of Ouagadougou. Her research interests are pseudodifferential operators and superalgebras.

Throughout her career, Ouedraogo has advocated for increasing the participation of girls and women in mathematics across Africa. She has emphasized mentorship, networking opportunities, and international collaboration as essential for improving gender equity in mathematical sciences.

== Service ==
In 2009, she became president of the African Mathematical Union Commission on Women in Mathematics in Africa. She helped revive The AMUCWMA seeks to get girls in Africa more interested in mathematics and potentially choose it as a career. In October 2012, she co-hosted a workshop with the International Center of Pure and Applied Mathematics (ICPAM) to generate interest in mathematics among African women. Ouedraogo served as the founding President of the African Women in Mathematics Association from its establishment in July 2013 until October 2025, when she was succeeded by Selma Negzaoui. She gave a talk entitled "Mathematics and Women: Different Regions, Similar Struggles" at the ICWM forum in August 2014.

== Publications ==
- Extension of the canonical trace and associated determinants, thèse de l'université Blaise Pascal (Clermont-Ferrand II), under the direction of Akry Koulibaly, Sylvie Paycha, 2009.
- On the existence of ad-nilpotent elements, Afrika Matematika (2014), DOI 10.1007/s13370-014-0246-y (with Come Jean Antoine Bere and Nakelgbamba Boukary Pilabre).
- A symmetrized canonical determinant on odd-class pseudodifferential operators, Geometric and topological methods for quantum field theory, 381–393, Cambridge Univ. Press, Cambridge, 2010.
- Uniqueness of traces on log-polyhomogeneous pseudodifferential operators, J. Aust. Math. Soc. 90, No. 2, 171–181 (2011) (with Catherine Ducourtioux).
- The multiplicative anomaly for determinants revisited; locality, Commun. Math. Anal. 12, no 1, 28–63 (2012) (with Sylvie Paycha).
- Classification of traces and associated determinants on odd-class operators in odd dimensions, SIGMA Symmetry Integrability Geom. Methods Appl. 8 Paper 023, 25pp (2012) (with Carolina Neira).
- A symmetrized canonical determinant on Odd-Class pseudodifferential operators
- Supersystèmes triples de Lie associés aux superalgèbres de Malcev, Afrika Matematica (3) 14 (2002), 19–30 (with Akry Koulibaly).
- Super-représentations faibles de superalgèbres de Malcev, Afrika Matematica (3) 14 (2002), 5–17
