= Babacar Niang (basketball) =

French basketball player

Babacar Niang (born March 31, 1991, in Montbrison, France) is a French basketball player who played for French Pro A league club Le Mans during the 2009–2010 season.
