= Babacar Diop =

Babacar Diop may refer to:

- Babacar Diop (Mauritanian footballer) (born 1995), Mauritanian footballer
- Babacar Diop (politician) (born 1982), Senegalese politician
- Babacar Diop (Senegalese footballer) (born 1993), Senegalese footballer
