= African Mathematical Union =

International organization devoted to Mathematics

- Formation: 1976; 50 years ago
- Headquarters: Rabat, Morocco
- President: Basile Guy Richard Bossoto
- Website: www.africanmathunion.org

The African Mathematical Union (or Union Mathematique Africaine) is an African organization dedicated to the development of mathematics in Africa. It was founded in 1976 in Rabat, Morocco, during the first Pan-African Congress of Mathematicians with Henri Hogbe Nlend as its first President. Another key figure in its early years was George Saitoti, later a prominent Kenyan politician.

== Commissions ==
The Union has five Commissions:

1. AMU-CAWM. Commission on Women in Mathematics in Africa, led by Marie Françoise Ouedraogo since 2009.
2. AMU-CMEA. Commission on Mathematics Education in Africa.
3. AMU-CHMA. Commission on the History of Mathematics in Africa.
4. AMU-CRIMS. Commission for Research and Innovations.
5. AMU-PAMOC. Pan African Mathematics Olympiads Commission.

=== Commission on Women in Mathematics ===
The Commission on Women in Mathematics (AMUCAWM) published a report on women with a doctorate in mathematics.

The Commission on Women in Mathematics (AMUCAWM) was created in 1986. At the AMUCWMA's 2012 conference in Ouagadougou, a panel on the state on women in mathematics in Africa recommended the creation of an association for African female mathematicians. The AWUCWMA held another conference soon after in July 2013 in Cape Town, where the African Women in Mathematics Association was formed.

== Journal ==
Since 1978 the Union has published the journal Afrika Matematica (ISSN 1012-9405), has been edited by Daouda Sangare until 2009.

As of 2010, the journal is edited by Jacek Banasiak of the University of KwaZulu-Natal, Durban, South Africa.

The deputy editors of the journal are:

- Moussa Ouattara, University of Ouagadougou, Ouagadougou, Burkina Faso
- Daniel Makinde, Cape Peninsula University of Technology, Cape Town, South Africa.

The members of the advisory committee are:

- Aderemi Kuku, Grambling State University, Grambling, USA
- Laurent Lafforgue, Institut des Hautes Études Scientifiques, Bures-sur-Yvette, France
- Ari Laptev, Imperial College, London, UK
- Claudio Procesi, University of Rome 'La Sapienza', Rome, Italy
- Michel Waldschmidt, Pierre and Marie Curie University, Paris, France
