= Centre International de Mathématiques Pures et Appliquées =

International mathematics institute

Centre international de mathématiques pures et appliquées
- Established: 1978
- Type: 1901 French law on associations
- Purpose: Promotion of the research in mathematics in developing countries
- Headquarters: Nice (France)
- President: Helena Judith Nussenzveig Lopes
- Executive Director: Christophe Ritzenthaler
- Website: cimpa.info

The Centre International de Mathématiques Pures et Appliquées (CIMPA; English: International Centre for Pure and Applied Mathematics) is a category 2 UNESCO centre based in Nice with the mission to promote research in mathematics with developing countries. CIMPA is an association under the 1901 French law on associations and is funded by government agencies of France, Norway, Spain, Switzerland and Germany.

== History ==
Following a recommendation made during the 18th session of the General Conference of UNESCO in Paris in 1974, the creation of CIMPA was decided during the 19th session of the General Conference of UNESCO in Nairobi in 1976. On the initiative of the French Government and a group of founding members (J.P. Aubin, J. Céa, P. Deheuvels, F. Dress, C. Godbillon, H. Hogbe Nlend, J.L. Lions, J.L. Koszul, E.J. Picard, A. Revuz, P. Sabourin), the International Center for Pure and Applied Mathematics was formally created as an association of the law of 1901, on 30 October 1978. According to its statutes, its mission is the training of mathematicians coming in priority from developing countries, by means research schools, courses and grants for thematic programs or research visits. The headquarter of CIMPA is fixed at Nice, and its host university is the University Côte d'Azur.

== Activities ==
The organization of research schools in developing countries constitutes the historic main activity of CIMPA. This is supplemented by other kinds of actions such as CIMPA courses at Master or PhD levels in institutes located in developing countries. The CIMPA Fellowships offer supports for participants of students and young researchers to thematic programs. Finally, the CIMPA-ICTP Research in Pairs allow colleagues from developing countries to work on a research project with a colleague in Europe for several weeks.

CIMPA also supports schools in partnership with learned societies like the African Mathematical Union (AMU), the Mathematical Union of Latin America and the Caribbeans (UMALCA), the South East Asian Mathematical Society (SEAMS) or the committee for Asian and European Schools in Mathematics (AESIM).

CIMPA works in coordination with other organizations with similar aims such as the International Mathematical Union (IMU), the European Mathematical Society (EMS) or the Abdus Salam International Centre for Theoretical Physics (ICTP).

== Funding ==
The principal financial support of CIMPA comes from the French Ministry of Higher Education, Research and Innovation (MESR), the University Côte d'Azur, the laboratory of excellence CARMIN (Centre for international mathematical encounters), and the National Institute of Mathematical Sciences and their interactions (INSMI) of the Centre National de la Recherche Scientifique (CNRS). Since 2009, CIMPA has also been supported by the Ministry of Economics and Business (MINECO, Spain). Since 2011, CIMPA has additionally been supported by the Ministry of Education and Research (Norway), and by a grant from Switzerland via the University of Neuchâtel. Since 2022, the Bundesministerium für Bildung und Forschung of Germany has also provided financial support.

== Presidents ==
- 1978: Jean Céa
- 1979–1988: Henri Hogbe Nlend
- 1989–1992: François Dress
- 1993–1996: Attia Ashour
- 1997–2000: Roger Ballay
- 2001–2004: Mohamed Jaoua
- 2005–2008: Mario Wschebor
- 2009-2016: Tsou Sheung Tsun
- 2017-2025: Barry Green
- Since February 2025: Helena Judith Nussenzveig Lopes

== Executive directors ==
- 1979–1984: Pierre Grisvard
- 1985: Solange Delache
- 1986–1991: Jean-Michel Lemaire
- 1992–1994: Georges Dloussky
- 1994: Jean Pouget
- 1995–2000: Claude Lobry
- 2000–2008: Michel Jambu
- 2008-2016: Claude Cibils
- 2016-2020: Ludovic Rifford
- Since September 2020: Christophe Ritzenthaler
