= Jean-Ismaila Niang =

Senegalese footballer

Jéan Niang
Personal information
- Full name: Jean-Ismaïla Niang
- Date of birth: December 25, 1987 (age 38)
- Place of birth: Dakar, Senegal
- Height: 1.84 m (6 ft 1/2 in)
- Position: Midfielder

Team information
- Current team: Roye

Youth career
- Elite Foot Dakar

Senior career*
| Years | Team | Apps | (Gls) |
| 2005–2010 | Amiens | 20 | (0) |
| 2007–2008 | → Pau FC (loan) | 19 | (0) |
| 2010–2012 | Evreux | 7 | (0) |
| 2012– | Roye | 11 | (2) |
- * Club domestic league appearances and goals as of 13:02, 9 April 2010 (UTC)

Jean-Ismaïla Niang (born December 25, 1987) is a Senegalese professional football player, who currently plays in the Championnat National for Roye.

== Career ==
He played on the professional level in Ligue 2 for Amiens SC.
