= Jean Mawhin =

Belgian mathematician

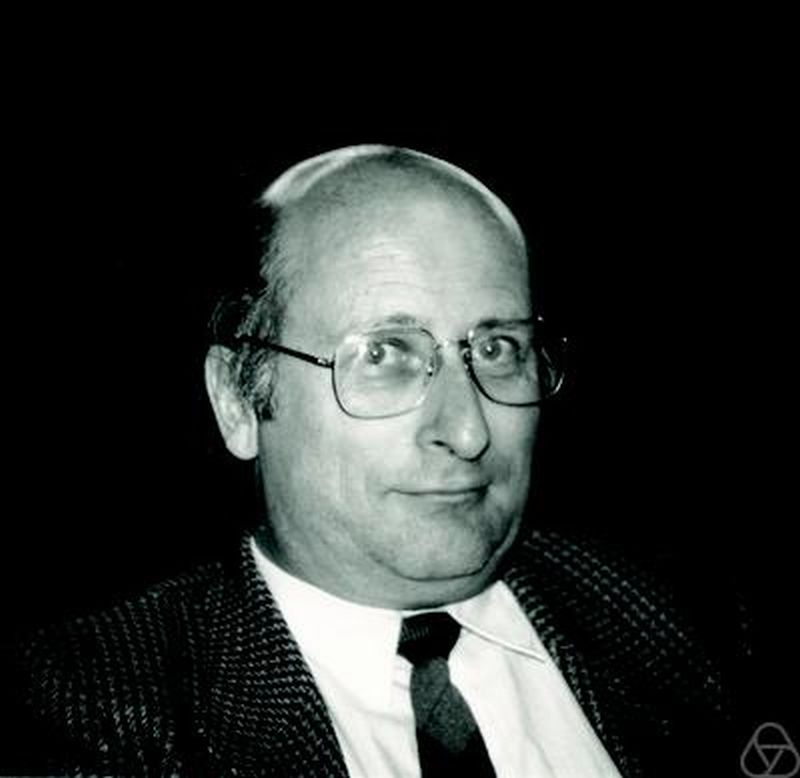
Jean Mawhin in 1988

Jean L. Mawhin (born 11 December 1942 in Verviers) is a Belgian mathematician and historian of mathematics.

Mawhin received his PhD in 1969 (Le problème des solutions périodiques en mécanique non linéaire) under Paul Ledoux at the University of Liège, where he had studied since 1962 and received his licentiate in mathematics in 1964. He was assistant professor at Liège from 1964 and maitre de conferences (lecturer) from 1969 to 1973. From 1970 he was assistant professor (chargé de cours) and from 1974 professor of mathematics at the Université catholique de Louvain (with full professorship from 1977). In 2008 he retired.

He was a visiting professor at various US and Canadian universities (University of Michigan, Brown University, University of Utah, Colorado State University, University of Alberta, Centre de Recherches Mathématiques in Montreal, Rutgers University), at the University of Paris, in Strasbourg, Rome, Turin, Trieste, Brisbane, Graz, Brazil, Florence, Darmstadt, Karlsruhe and Würzburg.

He worked on (nonlinear) ordinary differential equations and the topological methods used there (fixed-point theorems, Leray-Schauder theory) and methods of nonlinear functional analysis. As a historian of mathematics, he dealt with Henri Poincaré, among others.

He received the Bolzano Medal of the Czech Academy of Sciences. In 2012, he was awarded the first Juliusz Schauder Prize.

In 1986 he became a corresponding member and in 1992 a full member of the Royal Academy of Science, Letters and Fine Arts of Belgium, of which he was president in 2002, and director of the Class of Sciences. In 1992 he became an honorary member of the Grand Ducal Institute.

He has been married since 1966 and has three children.

== Selected works ==
- with Michel Willem, Critical point theory and hamiltonian systems, Springer 1989
- with Robert E. Gaines, Coincidence degree and nonlinear differential equations, Springer 1977
- Topological degree methods in nonlinear boundary value problems, American Mathematical Society 1979
- Points fixes, points critiques et problèmes aux limites, Presses de l’Université de Montreal, 1985
- with Nicolas Rouche, Equations differentielles ordinaires, Paris, Masson 1973 (english translation Ordinary differential equations: stability and periodic solutions, Boston, Pitman, 1980)
- Boundary value problems for nonlinear ordinary differential equations: from successive approximations to topology, in Jean-Paul Pier Development of Mathematics 1900-1950, Birkhäuser 1994
- Topological fixed point theory and nonlinear differential equations, in R. F. Brown et.al. (eds.) Handbook of Topological Fixed Point Theory, Springer 2005, p. 867–904
- Leray-Schauder degree, a half century of extensions and applications, Topological Methods in Nonlinear Analysis, Journal of the Juliusz Schauder Center, Vol. 14, 1999, p. 195–228
- The centennial legacy of Poincaré and Lyapunov in ordinary differential equations, Rend. Circolo Math. Palermo, Suppl. 34, 1994, S. 9–46
- Poincaré’s early use of Analysis Situs in nonlinear differential equations, Philos. Sci., Vol. 4, 2000, p. 103–143
- Nonlinear oscillations: a hundred years after Poincaré and Liapunov, Journal of Applied Mathematics and Mechanics, Vol. 73, 1993, T 53-T62
- Les mathématiques, in: Robert Halleux, Geert Vanpaemel, Jan Vandersmissen, Andrée Despy-Meyer (eds.), Histoire des sciences en Belgique, 1815-2000, Brussels: Dexia/La Renaissance du livre, 2001, Vol. 1
