= 2015 FIFA U-20 World Cup =

2015 FIFA i Raro i te 20 Marama o te Ao

Tournament details
- Host country: New Zealand
- Dates: 30 May – 20 June
- Teams: 24 (from 6 confederations)
- Venue: 7 (in 7 host cities)

Final positions
- Champions: Serbia (1st title)
- Runners-up: Brazil
- Third place: Mali
- Fourth place: Senegal

Tournament statistics
- Matches played: 52
- Goals scored: 154 (2.96 per match)
- Attendance: 396,668 (7,628 per match)
- Top scorer(s): (Hungary) Bence Mervó (Ukraine) Viktor Kovalenko (5 goals each)
- Best player: (Mali) Adama Traoré
- Best goalkeeper: (Serbia) Predrag Rajković
- Fair play award: Ukraine

The 2015 FIFA U-20 World Cup was the twentieth edition of the FIFA U-20 World Cup since its inception in 1977 as the FIFA World Youth Championship. The competition took place for the first time in New Zealand, the third time on Oceanian soil after Australia staged the 1981 and 1993 editions. A total of 52 matches were played in seven host cities.

During the first meeting of the local organising committee in January 2013, provisional dates of 19 June to 11 July were given towards hosting of games, with a final decision on stadiums and cities originally meant to be taken in February 2013. However, delays meant that venues were not announced until August 2013.

France, the 2013 champions, were unable to defend their title as they failed to reach the final round of the UEFA qualifying tournament. In doing so, they became the fourth consecutive incumbent title holder to fail to qualify for the subsequent tournament.

Serbia won the final against Brazil 2–1, becoming the first team representing the country to win a FIFA competition title since the breakup of Yugoslavia and the dissolution of Serbia and Montenegro. Yugoslavia previously won the 1987 FIFA World Youth Championship.

== Host selection ==
Four FIFA member associations officially submitted their bids to host the 2015 FIFA U-20 World Cup by the deadline of 11 February 2011. On 3 March 2011, FIFA announced that the tournament would be held for the first time in New Zealand. This is the third FIFA competition staged in this country, after the 1999 FIFA U-17 World Championship and the 2008 FIFA U-17 Women's World Cup.

Bidding member associations

- (New Zealand) New Zealand
- Peru
- Tunisia
- Wales

== Venues ==
Auckland, Christchurch, Dunedin, Hamilton, New Plymouth, Wellington and Whangārei were the 7 cities chosen to host the competition.

Before the stadium announcements were made, Dunedin City council suggested in January 2013, that it would not bid to host matches at Forsyth Barr Stadium (also known as Otago Stadium) unless the costs (an estimated $1m) could be lowered. The stadium hosted seven matches there, the last of which being a Round of 16 game.

Wellington	Auckland	New Plymouth
Wellington Regional Stadium	North Harbour Stadium	Stadium Taranaki
41°16′23″S 174°47′9″E	36°43′37″S 174°42′6″E	39°4′13″S 174°3′54″E
Capacity: 35,187	Capacity: 25,317	Capacity: 25,000
Dunedin	2015 FIFA U-20 World Cup (New Zealand)	
Otago Stadium	2015 FIFA U-20 World Cup (New Zealand)	
45°52′9″S 170°31′28″E	2015 FIFA U-20 World Cup (New Zealand)	
Capacity: 23,095	2015 FIFA U-20 World Cup (New Zealand)	
Hamilton	Christchurch	Whangārei
Waikato Stadium	Christchurch Stadium	Northland Events Centre
37°46′52″S 175°16′6″E	43°32′37.32″S 172°36′14.76″E	35°44′3″S 174°19′46″E
Capacity: 19,237	Capacity: 17,308	Capacity: 8,016

== Qualified teams ==
In addition to host nation New Zealand, 23 nations qualified from six separate continental competitions.

Confederation	Qualifying Tournament	Qualifier(s)
AFC (Asia)	2014 AFC U-19 Championship	Myanmar^{1} North Korea; Qatar; Uzbekistan
CAF (Africa)	2015 African U-20 Championship	Ghana; Mali; Nigeria; Senegal^{1}
CONCACAF (North, Central America & Caribbean)	2015 CONCACAF U-20 Championship	Honduras; Mexico; Panama; United States
CONMEBOL (South America)	2015 South American Youth Championship	Argentina; Brazil; Colombia; Uruguay
OFC (Oceania)	Host nation	New Zealand
OFC (Oceania)	2014 OFC U-20 Championship	Fiji^{1}
UEFA (Europe)	2014 UEFA European Under-19 Championship	Austria; Germany; Hungary; Portugal; Serbia^{2} Ukraine

1. Teams that made their debut.
2. Serbia made their first U-20 World Cup appearance as an independent nation. They were chosen as the descendant of the now-defunct Yugoslavia, which qualified in 1979 and 1987.

== Draw and schedule ==
The final draw was held on 10 February 2015, 17:30 local time, at the SkyCity Grand, Auckland. For the draw, the 24 teams were divided into four seeding pots:

- Pot 1: Hosts and continental champions of five confederations (except OFC)
- Pot 2: Remaining teams from AFC and CAF
- Pot 3: Remaining teams from CONCACAF and CONMEBOL
- Pot 4: Remaining teams from OFC and UEFA

As a basic principle, teams from the same confederation could not be drawn against each other at the group stage. As the CAF U-20 Championship was not completed at the time of the draw, a separate draw took place on 23 March 2015 in Dakar, Senegal, at the tournament's conclusion to determine the groups where the 2nd, 3rd and 4th placed CAF teams would play in, to ensure there was no manipulation of games in the qualifying tournament ensuring fairness to all qualified teams.

Pot 1	Pot 2	Pot 3	Pot 4
New Zealand (Group A); Argentina (Group B); Qatar (Group C); Mexico (Group D); Nigeria (Group E); Germany (Group F)	North Korea; Myanmar; Uzbekistan; Mali; Ghana; Senegal	Honduras; Panama; United States; Brazil; Colombia; Uruguay	Fiji; Austria; Hungary; Portugal; Serbia; Ukraine

The schedule of the tournament was unveiled on 20 November 2013.

== Match officials ==
A total of 21 referees, 6 support referees, and 42 assistant referees were selected for the tournament.

Confederation	Referee	Assistant referees	Support referee
AFC	(Japan) Ryuji Sato	(Japan) Akane Yagi (Japan) Hiroshi Yamauchi	(Singapore) Muhammad Taqi Aljaafari
AFC	(Saudi Arabia) Fahad Al-Mirdasi	(Oman) Abu Bakar Al-Amri (Saudi Arabia) Abdullah Al-Shalawi	(Singapore) Muhammad Taqi Aljaafari
AFC	(South Korea) Kim Jong-hyeok	(South Korea) Yoon Kwang-yeol (South Korea) Yang Byoung-eun	(Singapore) Muhammad Taqi Aljaafari
CAF	(Egypt) Gehad Grisha	(Eritrea) Berhe Tesfagiorghis (Sudan) Waleed Ahmed	(Ghana) Joseph Lamptey
CAF	(Gabon) Eric Otogo-Castane	(Cameroon) Elvis Noupue (Niger) Yahaya Mahamadou	(Ghana) Joseph Lamptey
CAF	(Seychelles) Bernard Camille	(Ivory Coast) Marius Tan (South Africa) Zakhele Siwela	(Ghana) Joseph Lamptey
CONCACAF	(Costa Rica) Henry Bejarano	(Costa Rica) Carlos Fernández (Costa Rica) Octavio Jara	(Honduras) Armando Castro
CONCACAF	(Mexico) César Ramos	(Mexico) Alberto Morín (Mexico) Miguel Hernández	(Honduras) Armando Castro
CONCACAF	(Panama) John Pitti	(Panama) Gabriel Victoria (Panama) Juan Baynes	(Honduras) Armando Castro
CONMEBOL	(Argentina) Mauro Vigliano	(Argentina) Ezequiel Brailovsky (Argentina) Iván Núñez	(Venezuela) Jesús Valenzuela
CONMEBOL	(Brazil) Ricardo Marques	(Brazil) Bruno Boschilia (Brazil) Kléber Gil	(Venezuela) Jesús Valenzuela
CONMEBOL	(Ecuador) Roddy Zambrano	(Ecuador) Juan Macias (Ecuador) Luis Vera	(Venezuela) Jesús Valenzuela
CONMEBOL	(Uruguay) Daniel Fedorczuk	(Uruguay) Nicolás Taran (Uruguay) Richard Trinidad	(Venezuela) Jesús Valenzuela
OFC	(New Zealand) Matt Conger	(New Zealand) Simon Lount (Tonga) Tevita Makasini	(New Zealand) Nick Waldron
UEFA	(Croatia) Ivan Bebek	(Croatia) Miro Grgić (Croatia) Tomislav Petrović	(Israel) Liran Liany
UEFA	(Germany) Felix Zwayer	(Germany) Marco Achmüller (Germany) Thorsten Schiffner	(Israel) Liran Liany
UEFA	(Hungary) István Vad	(Hungary) István Albert (Hungary) Vencel Tóth	(Israel) Liran Liany
UEFA	(Italy) Daniele Orsato	(Italy) Lorenzo Manganelli (Italy) Mauro Tonolini	(Israel) Liran Liany
UEFA	(Portugal) Artur Soares Dias	(Portugal) Álvaro Carvalho (Portugal) Rui Tavares	(Israel) Liran Liany
UEFA	(Romania) Ovidiu Hațegan	(Romania) Octavian Șovre (Romania) Sebastian Gheorghe	(Israel) Liran Liany
UEFA	(Spain) Antonio Mateu Lahoz	(Spain) Pau Cebrián Devis (Spain) Roberto Díaz Pérez	(Israel) Liran Liany

== Squads ==
The 24 squads were officially announced by FIFA on 21 May 2015. Each participating national association had to submit a final list of 21 players (three of whom must be goalkeepers) at least 10 days before the tournament started. These players were shortlisted from a provisional list of 35 players, including a minimum of four goalkeepers. All players must have been born on or after 1 January 1995. If a player listed in the final squad suffered a serious injury up until 24 hours before the kick-off of his team's first match, he could be replaced by a player from the provisional list with the approval of FIFA's medical and organising committees.

In July 2015, it was reported that the New Zealand squad had included an ineligible player, South African Deklan Wynne not having completed the requisite period of residence in New Zealand.

== Group stage ==
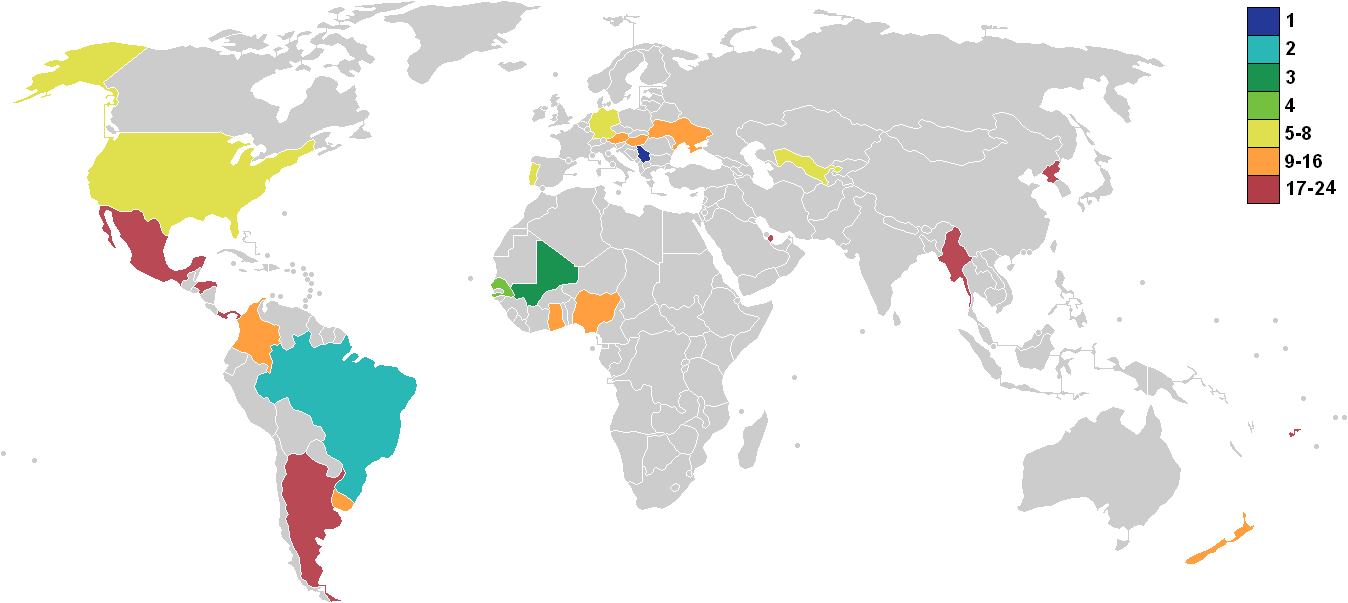
Stages reached by each team

The winners and runners-up of each group and the best four third-placed teams advanced to the round of 16. The rankings of teams in each group were determined as follows:

1. points obtained in all group matches;
2. goal difference in all group matches;
3. number of goals scored in all group matches;

If two or more teams were equal on the basis of the above three criteria, their rankings were determined as follows:

4. points obtained in the group matches between the teams concerned;
5. goal difference in the group matches between the teams concerned;
6. number of goals scored in the group matches between the teams concerned;
7. drawing of lots by the FIFA Organising Committee.

All times are local, New Zealand Standard Time (UTC+12).

=== Group A ===
Pos	Team	Pld	W	D	L	GF	GA	GD	Pts	Group stage result
1	Ukraine	3	2	1	0	9	0	+9	7	Advance to knockout stage
2	United States	3	2	0	1	6	4	+2	6	Advance to knockout stage
3	New Zealand (H)	3	1	1	1	5	5	0	4	Advance to knockout stage
4	Myanmar	3	0	0	3	2	13	−11	0	

Source: FIFA
(H) Hosts
30 May 2015
13:00

New Zealand	0–0	Ukraine
	Report

North Harbour Stadium, Auckland
Attendance: 25,000
Referee: Mauro Vigliano (Argentina)
30 May 2015
16:00

United States	2–1	Myanmar
Tall 17'; Hyndman 56'	Report	Yan Naing Oo 9'

Northland Events Centre, Whangārei
Attendance: 5,816
Referee: Bernard Camille (Seychelles)

2 June 2015
13:00

Myanmar	0–6	Ukraine
	Report	Yaremchuk 51'; Luchkevych 54'; Kovalenko 57', 77'; Sobol 68'; Besyedin 71'

Northland Events Centre, Whangārei
Attendance: 4,985
Referee: Ricardo Marques (Brazil)
2 June 2015
19:00

New Zealand	0–4	United States
	Report	Jamieson 6'; Hyndman 33'; Arriola 57'; Rubin 83'

North Harbour Stadium, Auckland
Attendance: 15,678
Referee: Antonio Mateu Lahoz (Spain)

5 June 2015
19:00

Myanmar	1–5	New Zealand
Aung Thu 27'	Report	Billingsley 40'; Patterson 47'; Stevens 78'; Brotherton 81'; Lewis 89'

Wellington Regional Stadium, Wellington
Attendance: 15,527
Referee: John Pitti (Panama)
5 June 2015
19:00

Ukraine	3–0	United States
Kovalenko 56', 74', 79'	Report

North Harbour Stadium, Auckland
Attendance: 7,694
Referee: Eric Otogo-Castane (Gabon)

=== Group B ===
Pos	Team	Pld	W	D	L	GF	GA	GD	Pts	Group stage result
1	Ghana	3	2	1	0	5	3	+2	7	Advance to knockout stage
2	Austria	3	1	2	0	3	2	+1	5	Advance to knockout stage
3	Argentina	3	0	2	1	4	5	−1	2	
4	Panama	3	0	1	2	3	5	−2	1	

Source: FIFA
30 May 2015
16:00

Argentina	2–2	Panama
Correa 14', 79'	Report	Rodríguez 19'; Escobar 84'

Wellington Regional Stadium, Wellington
Attendance: 9,204
Referee: Artur Soares Dias (Portugal)
30 May 2015
19:00

Ghana	1–1	Austria
Y. Yeboah 90+1' (pen.)	Report	Gschweidl 50'

Wellington Regional Stadium, Wellington
Attendance: 9,204
Referee: Fahad Al-Mirdasi (Saudi Arabia)

2 June 2015
16:00

Austria	2–1	Panama
Hormechea 45+1' (o.g.); Grubeck 51'	Report	Escobar 38'

Wellington Regional Stadium, Wellington
Attendance: 2,009
Referee: Gehad Grisha (Egypt)
2 June 2015
19:00

Argentina	2–3	Ghana
Simeone 80'; Buendía 90'	Report	B. Tetteh 44'; Aboagye 59'; Y. Yeboah 69' (pen.)

Wellington Regional Stadium, Wellington
Attendance: 5,542
Referee: Ivan Bebek (Croatia)

5 June 2015
16:00

Austria	0–0	Argentina
	Report

Wellington Regional Stadium, Wellington
Attendance: 13,874
Referee: Ryuji Sato (Japan)
5 June 2015
16:00

Panama	0–1	Ghana
	Report	Boateng 82'

North Harbour Stadium, Auckland
Attendance: 3,637
Referee: Daniele Orsato (Italy)

=== Group C ===
Pos	Team	Pld	W	D	L	GF	GA	GD	Pts	Group stage result
1	Portugal	3	3	0	0	10	1	+9	9	Advance to knockout stage
2	Colombia	3	1	1	1	3	4	−1	4	Advance to knockout stage
3	Senegal	3	1	1	1	3	5	−2	4	Advance to knockout stage
4	Qatar	3	0	0	3	1	7	−6	0	

Source: FIFA
31 May 2015
13:00

Qatar	0–1	Colombia
	Report	Rodríguez 24'

Waikato Stadium, Hamilton
Attendance: 7,461
Referee: Matt Conger (New Zealand)
31 May 2015
16:00

Portugal	3–0	Senegal
Martins 1'; Silva 90'; Santos 90+3'	Report

Waikato Stadium, Hamilton
Attendance: 10,362
Referee: César Ramos (Mexico)

3 June 2015
16:00

Qatar	0–4	Portugal
	Report	Silva 34'; Rodrigues 42', 66'; Vigário 74'

Waikato Stadium, Hamilton
Attendance: 1,864
Referee: Daniel Fedorczuk (Uruguay)
3 June 2015
19:00

Senegal	1–1	Colombia
Thiam 23'	Report	Zapata 43' (pen.)

Waikato Stadium, Hamilton
Attendance: 3,981
Referee: István Vad (Hungary)

6 June 2015
13:00

Senegal	2–1	Qatar
Sylla 76'; Wagué 81'	Report	Afif 17' (pen.)

Waikato Stadium, Hamilton
Attendance: 3,791
Referee: Felix Zwayer (Germany)
6 June 2015
13:00

Colombia	1–3	Portugal
Borré 74'	Report	Santos 3'; Silva 55' (pen.), 67'

Otago Stadium, Dunedin
Attendance: 6,950
Referee: Henry Bejarano (Costa Rica)

=== Group D ===
Pos	Team	Pld	W	D	L	GF	GA	GD	Pts	Group stage result
1	Serbia	3	2	0	1	4	1	+3	6	Advance to knockout stage
2	Uruguay	3	1	1	1	3	3	0	4 (Note: The final positions of Mali and Uruguay were decided by drawing of lots, conducted in Auckland and witnessed by both teams via a live video link, which placed Uruguay in second and Mali in third. Both teams had advanced to the round of 16.)	Advance to knockout stage
3	Mali	3	1	1	1	3	3	0	4	Advance to knockout stage
4	Mexico	3	1	0	2	2	5	−3	3	

Source: FIFA
Notes:
31 May 2015
13:00

Mexico	0–2	Mali
	Report	A. Traoré 77'; Gbakle 79'

Otago Stadium, Dunedin
Attendance: 4,299
Referee: Felix Zwayer (Germany)
31 May 2015
16:00

Uruguay	1–0	Serbia
Pereiro 56'	Report

Otago Stadium, Dunedin
Attendance: 6,048
Referee: Ryuji Sato (Japan)

3 June 2015
16:00

Mexico	2–1	Uruguay
Lozano 71'; Gutiérrez 90+3'	Report	Suárez 83'

Otago Stadium, Dunedin
Attendance: 2,038
Referee: Ovidiu Hațegan (Romania)
3 June 2015
19:00

Serbia	2–0	Mali
S. Milinković-Savić 27'; Mandić 74'	Report

Otago Stadium, Dunedin
Attendance: 4,012
Referee: Roddy Zambrano (Ecuador)

6 June 2015
16:00

Serbia	2–0	Mexico
Maksimović 2'; Živković 43'	Report

Otago Stadium, Dunedin
Attendance: 9,248
Referee: Ricardo Marques (Brazil)
6 June 2015
16:00

Mali	1–1	Uruguay
A. Traoré 44'	Report	Acosta 17'

Waikato Stadium, Hamilton
Attendance: 6,791
Referee: Artur Soares Dias (Portugal)

=== Group E ===
Pos	Team	Pld	W	D	L	GF	GA	GD	Pts	Group stage result
1	Brazil	3	3	0	0	9	3	+6	9	Advance to knockout stage
2	Nigeria	3	2	0	1	8	4	+4	6	Advance to knockout stage
3	Hungary	3	1	0	2	6	5	+1	3	Advance to knockout stage
4	North Korea	3	0	0	3	1	12	−11	0	

Source: FIFA
1 June 2015
13:00

Nigeria	2–4	Brazil
Success 10'; Yahaya 28'	Report	Gabriel Jesus 4'; Judivan 34', 82'; Boschilia 59'

Stadium Taranaki, New Plymouth
Attendance: 5,887
Referee: Daniele Orsato (Italy)
1 June 2015
16:00

North Korea	1–5	Hungary
Choe Ju-song 32'	Report	Mervó 17', 49', 82'; Kalmár 33'; Forgács 60'

Stadium Taranaki, New Plymouth
Attendance: 8,153
Referee: Henry Bejarano (Costa Rica)

4 June 2015
16:00

Nigeria	4–0	North Korea
Saviour 48', 51'; Sokari 71'; Success 80'	Report

Stadium Taranaki, New Plymouth
Attendance: 1,114
Referee: Mauro Vigliano (Argentina)
4 June 2015
19:00

Hungary	1–2	Brazil
Mervó 8'	Report	Danilo 50'; A. Pereira 86' (pen.)

Stadium Taranaki, New Plymouth
Attendance: 4,077
Referee: Fahad Al-Mirdasi (Saudi Arabia)

7 June 2015
17:00

Hungary	0–2	Nigeria
	Report	Awoniyi 33', 54'

Stadium Taranaki, New Plymouth
Attendance: 3,184
Referee: Roddy Zambrano (Ecuador)
7 June 2015
17:00

Brazil	3–0	North Korea
Min Hyo-song 60' (o.g.); Jean Carlos 66'; L. Pereira 86'	Report

Christchurch Stadium, Christchurch
Attendance: 15,298
Referee: Matt Conger (New Zealand)

=== Group F ===
Pos	Team	Pld	W	D	L	GF	GA	GD	Pts	Group stage result
1	Germany	3	3	0	0	16	2	+14	9	Advance to knockout stage
2	Uzbekistan	3	1	0	2	6	7	−1	3	Advance to knockout stage
3	Honduras	3	1	0	2	5	11	−6	3	
4	Fiji	3	1	0	2	4	11	−7	3	

Source: FIFA
1 June 2015
13:00

Germany	8–1	Fiji
Stark 18', 27'; Stendera 20' (pen.); Prömel 23'; Mukhtar 34', 40', 89' (pen.); Stefaniak 68'	Report	Verevou 48'

Christchurch Stadium, Christchurch
Attendance: 5,296
Referee: John Pitti (Panama)
1 June 2015
16:00

Uzbekistan	3–4	Honduras
Khamdamov 31'; Shomurodov 79'; Urinboev 90+6'	Report	Benavídez 4'; Róchez 20', 90+2'; Álvarez 49'

Christchurch Stadium, Christchurch
Attendance: 6,679
Referee: Eric Otogo-Castane (Gabon)

4 June 2015
16:00

Honduras	0–3	Fiji
	Report	Verevou 14'; Waqa 19'; Álvarez 45' (o.g.)

Christchurch Stadium, Christchurch
Attendance: 1,220
Referee: Kim Jong-hyeok (South Korea)
4 June 2015
19:00

Germany	3–0	Uzbekistan
Stendera 33', 85'; Akpoguma 59'	Report

Christchurch Stadium, Christchurch
Attendance: 3,393
Referee: César Ramos (Mexico)

7 June 2015
14:00

Honduras	1–5	Germany
Schwäbe 19' (o.g.)	Report	Stendera 2' (pen.); Brandt 30'; Mukhtar 50'; Prömel 62'; Stark 81'

Christchurch Stadium, Christchurch
Attendance: 12,045
Referee: Daniel Fedorczuk (Uruguay)
7 June 2015
14:00

Fiji	0–3	Uzbekistan
	Report	Shomurodov 62'; Urinboev 63'; Kosimov 90+3'

Northland Events Centre, Whangārei
Attendance: 5,011
Referee: Bernard Camille (Seychelles)

=== Ranking of third-placed teams ===
The four best ranked third-placed teams also advanced to the round of 16. They were paired with the winners of groups A, B, C and D, according to a table published in Section 18 of the tournament regulations.

Pos	Grp	Team	Pld	W	D	L	GF	GA	GD	Pts	Result
1	A	New Zealand (H)	3	1	1	1	5	5	0	4	Advance to knockout stage
2	D	Mali	3	1	1	1	3	3	0	4	Advance to knockout stage
3	C	Senegal	3	1	1	1	3	5	−2	4	Advance to knockout stage
4	E	Hungary	3	1	0	2	6	5	+1	3	Advance to knockout stage
5	F	Honduras	3	1	0	2	5	11	−6	3	
6	B	Argentina	3	0	2	1	4	5	−1	2	

Source: FIFA
Rules for classification: 1) points; 2) goal difference; 3) number of goals scored; 4) lots drawn by FIFA.
(H) Hosts

== Knockout stage ==
In the knockout stage, if a match was level at the end of regular time (two periods of 45 minutes), extra time was played (two periods of 15 minutes) and followed, if necessary, by a penalty shoot-out to determine the winner. In the case of the third place match, as it was played just before the final, extra time was skipped and a penalty shoot-out took place if necessary.

Round of 16
11 June — New Plymouth
Brazil (pen.)	0 (5)
Uruguay	0 (4)
11 June — Hamilton
Portugal	2
New Zealand	1
11 June — Whangārei
Austria	0
Uzbekistan	2
10 June — Auckland
Ukraine	1 (1)
Senegal (pen.)	1 (3)
10 June — Wellington
United States	1
Colombia	0
10 June — Dunedin
Serbia (a.e.t.)	2
Hungary	1
10 June — Wellington
Ghana	0
Mali	3
11 June — Christchurch
Germany	1
Nigeria	0

Quarter-finals
14 June — Hamilton
Brazil (pen.)	0 (3)
Portugal	0 (1)
14 June — Wellington
Uzbekistan	0
Senegal	1
14 June — Auckland
United States	0 (5)
Serbia (pen.)	0 (6)
14 June — Christchurch
Mali (pen.)	1 (4)
Germany	1 (3)

Semi-finals
17 June — Christchurch
Brazil	5
Senegal	0
17 June — Auckland
Serbia (a.e.t.)	2
Mali	1

Final
20 June — Auckland
Brazil	1
Serbia (a.e.t.)	2
Third place
20 June — Auckland
Senegal	1
Mali	3

Combinations of matches in the Round of 16

The third-placed teams which advanced to the round of 16 were placed with the winners of groups A, B, C and D according to a table published in Section 18 of the tournament regulations.

Combination according to the four qualified teams

Third-placed teams qualify from groups						1A vs	1B vs	1C vs	1D vs
A	B	C	D			3C	3D	3A	3B
A	B	C		E		3C	3A	3B	3E
A	B	C			F	3C	3A	3B	3F
A	B		D	E		3D	3A	3B	3E
A	B		D		F	3D	3A	3B	3F
A	B			E	F	3E	3A	3B	3F
A		C	D	E		3C	3D	3A	3E
A		C	D		F	3C	3D	3A	3F
A		C		E	F	3C	3A	3F	3E
A			D	E	F	3D	3A	3F	3E
	B	C	D	E		3C	3D	3B	3E
	B	C	D		F	3C	3D	3B	3F
	B	C		E	F	3E	3C	3B	3F
	B		D	E	F	3E	3D	3B	3F
		C	D	E	F	3C	3D	3F	3E

=== Round of 16 ===
10 June 2015
16:00

Ghana	0–3	Mali
	Report	Samassékou 20'; Gbakle 53'; Doumbia 81'

Wellington Regional Stadium, Wellington
Attendance: 2,235
Referee: Gehad Grisha (Egypt)

10 June 2015
16:00

Serbia	2–1 (a.e.t.)	Hungary
Šaponjić 90+1'; Talaber 118' (o.g.)	Report	Mervó 57'

Otago Stadium, Dunedin
Attendance: 5,149
Referee: Antonio Mateu Lahoz (Spain)

10 June 2015
19:30

United States	1–0	Colombia
Rubin 58'	Report

Wellington Regional Stadium, Wellington
Attendance: 6,062
Referee: Ivan Bebek (Croatia)

10 June 2015
19:30

Ukraine	1–1 (a.e.t.)	Senegal
Besyedin 70'	Report	Sarr 83'
Penalties
Chumak (penalty missed); Kharatin (penalty missed); Habelok (penalty scored); Luchkevych (penalty missed)	1–3	(penalty scored) Sarr; (penalty scored) Sylla; (penalty scored) Niang

North Harbour Stadium, Auckland
Attendance: 6,905
Referee: Ricardo Marques (Brazil)

11 June 2015
16:00

Austria	0–2	Uzbekistan
	Report	Khamdamov 47', 57'

Northland Events Centre, Whangārei
Attendance: 3,964
Referee: John Pitti (Panama)

11 June 2015
19:30

Germany	1–0	Nigeria
Öztunalı 19'	Report

Christchurch Stadium, Christchurch
Attendance: 5,288
Referee: Fahad Al-Mirdasi (Saudi Arabia)

11 June 2015
19:30

Portugal	2–1	New Zealand
Guzzo 24'; Martins 87'	Report	Holthusen 64'

Waikato Stadium, Hamilton
Attendance: 10,492
Referee: Kim Jong-hyeok (South Korea)

11 June 2015
19:30

Brazil	0–0 (a.e.t.)	Uruguay
	Report
Penalties
A. Pereira (penalty scored); Lucão (penalty scored); Danilo (penalty scored); Jajá (penalty scored); Gabriel Jesus (penalty scored)	5–4	(penalty scored) Arambarri; (penalty missed) Amaral; (penalty scored) Poyet; (penalty scored) Acosta; (penalty scored) Lemos

Stadium Taranaki, New Plymouth
Attendance: 4,358
Referee: István Vad (Hungary)

=== Quarter-finals ===
14 June 2015
13:00

Brazil	0–0 (a.e.t.)	Portugal
	Report
Penalties
A. Pereira (penalty scored); Lucão (penalty missed); Danilo (penalty scored); Gabriel Jesus (penalty scored)	3–1	(penalty scored) Rony Lopes; (penalty missed) Guzzo; (penalty missed) Silva; (penalty missed) Nuno Santos

Waikato Stadium, Hamilton
Attendance: 9,945
Referee: Felix Zwayer (Germany)

14 June 2015
13:00

Mali	1–1 (a.e.t.)	Germany
S. Coulibaly 58'	Report	Brandt 38'
Penalties
Hamidou (penalty scored); Guindo (penalty scored); Koné (penalty scored); A. Traoré (penalty missed); Samassékou (penalty scored)	4–3	(penalty scored) Akpoguma; (penalty scored) Öztunalı; (penalty scored) Steinmann; (penalty missed) Brandt; (penalty missed) Stark

Christchurch Stadium, Christchurch
Attendance: 7,007
Referee: César Ramos (Mexico)

14 June 2015
16:30

United States	0–0 (a.e.t.)	Serbia
	Report
Penalties
Rubin (penalty missed); Payne (penalty scored); Arriola (penalty scored); Hyndman (penalty scored); Zelalem (penalty scored); Soñora (penalty missed); Delgado (penalty scored); Carter-Vickers (penalty missed); Requejo (penalty missed)	5–6	(penalty scored) Zdjelar; (penalty missed) Mandić; (penalty scored) Babić; (penalty scored) Grujić; (penalty scored) Živković; (penalty missed) Rajković; (penalty scored) Antonov; (penalty missed) Veljković; (penalty scored) Maksimović

North Harbour Stadium, Auckland
Attendance: 10,826
Referee: Artur Soares Dias (Portugal)

14 June 2015
16:30

Uzbekistan	0–1	Senegal
	Report	Thiam 77'

Wellington Regional Stadium, Wellington
Attendance: 10,258
Referee: Ovidiu Hațegan (Romania)

=== Semi-finals ===
17 June 2015
16:00

Brazil	5–0	Senegal
Correa 5' (o.g.); Marcos Guilherme 7', 78'; Boschilia 19'; Jorge 35'	Report

Christchurch Stadium, Christchurch
Attendance: 9,251
Referee: Daniele Orsato (Italy)

17 June 2015
19:30

Serbia	2–1 (a.e.t.)	Mali
Živković 4'; Šaponjić 101'	Report	Koné 39'

North Harbour Stadium, Auckland
Attendance: 10,818
Referee: Mauro Vigliano (Argentina)

=== Third place match ===
20 June 2015
13:30

Senegal	1–3	Mali
Wadji 64'	Report	A. Traoré 74', 83'; Samassékou 90+1'

North Harbour Stadium, Auckland
Attendance: 12,421
Referee: Gehad Grisha (Egypt)

=== Final ===
20 June 2015
17:05

Brazil	1–2 (a.e.t.)	Serbia
A. Pereira 73'	Report	Mandić 70'; Maksimović 118'

North Harbour Stadium, Auckland
Attendance: 25,317
Referee: Fahad Al-Mirdasi (Saudi Arabia)

== Awards ==
The following awards were given at the conclusion of the tournament. They were all sponsored by Adidas, except for the FIFA Fair Play Award.

Golden Ball	Silver Ball	Bronze Ball
(Mali) Adama Traoré	(Brazil) Danilo	(Serbia) Sergej Milinković-Savić
Golden Boot	Silver Boot	Bronze Boot
(Ukraine) Viktor Kovalenko	(Hungary) Bence Mervó	(Germany) Marc Stendera
5 goals, 2 assists	5 goals, 0 assists	4 goals, 4 assists
Golden Glove
(Serbia) Predrag Rajković
FIFA Fair Play Award
Ukraine

== Goalscorers ==
With five goals, Viktor Kovalenko and Bence Mervó were the top scorers in the tournament. In total, 154 goals were scored by 100 different players, with six of them credited as own goals.

5 goals

- (Ukraine) Viktor Kovalenko
- (Hungary) Bence Mervó

4 goals

- (Germany) Hany Mukhtar
- (Germany) Marc Stendera
- (Mali) Adama Traoré
- (Portugal) André Silva

3 goals

- (Germany) Niklas Stark
- (Uzbekistan) Dostonbek Khamdamov

2 goals

- (Argentina) Ángel Correa
- (Brazil) Andreas Pereira
- (Brazil) Gabriel Boschilia
- (Brazil) Judivan
- (Brazil) Marcos Guilherme
- (Fiji) Iosefo Verevou
- (Germany) Julian Brandt
- (Germany) Grischa Prömel
- (Ghana) Yaw Yeboah
- (Honduras) Bryan Róchez
- (Mali) Dieudonne Gbakle
- (Mali) Diadie Samassékou
- (Nigeria) Taiwo Awoniyi
- (Nigeria) Godwin Saviour
- (Nigeria) Isaac Success
- (Panama) Fidel Escobar
- (Portugal) Ivo Rodrigues
- (Portugal) Nuno Santos
- (Portugal) Gelson Martins
- (Senegal) Mamadou Thiam
- (Serbia) Nemanja Maksimović
- (Serbia) Staniša Mandić
- (Serbia) Ivan Šaponjić
- (Serbia) Andrija Živković
- (Ukraine) Artem Besyedin
- (United States) Emerson Hyndman
- (United States) Rubio Rubin
- (Uzbekistan) Eldor Shomurodov
- (Uzbekistan) Zabikhillo Urinboev

1 goal

- (Argentina) Emiliano Buendía
- (Argentina) Giovanni Simeone
- (Austria) Valentin Grubeck
- (Austria) Bernd Gschweidl
- (Brazil) Danilo
- (Brazil) Gabriel Jesus
- (Brazil) Jean Carlos
- (Brazil) Jorge
- (Brazil) Léo Pereira
- (Colombia) Rafael Santos Borré
- (Colombia) Joao Rodríguez
- (Colombia) Alexis Zapata
- (Fiji) Saula Waqa
- (Germany) Kevin Akpoguma
- (Germany) Levin Öztunalı
- (Germany) Marvin Stefaniak
- (Ghana) Clifford Aboagye
- (Ghana) Emmanuel Boateng
- (Ghana) Benjamin Tetteh
- (Honduras) Kevin Álvarez
- (Honduras) Jhow Benavidez
- (Hungary) Dávid Forgács
- (Hungary) Zsolt Kalmár
- (Mali) Souleymane Coulibaly
- (Mali) Aboubacar Doumbia
- (Mali) Youssouf Koné
- (Mexico) Kevin Gutiérrez
- (Mexico) Hirving Lozano
- (Myanmar) Yan Naing Oo
- (Myanmar) Aung Thu
- (New Zealand) Noah Billingsley
- (New Zealand) Sam Brotherton
- (New Zealand) Stuart Holthusen
- (New Zealand) Clayton Lewis
- (New Zealand) Monty Patterson
- (New Zealand) Joel Stevens
- (Nigeria) Kingsley Sokari
- (Nigeria) Musa Yahaya
- (North Korea) Choe Ju-song
- (Panama) Jhamal Rodríguez
- (Portugal) Raphael Guzzo
- (Portugal) João Vigário
- (Qatar) Akram Afif
- (Senegal) Moussa Koné
- (Senegal) Sidy Sarr
- (Senegal) Ibrahima Wadji
- (Serbia) Sergej Milinković-Savić
- (Ukraine) Valeriy Luchkevych
- (Ukraine) Eduard Sobol
- (Ukraine) Roman Yaremchuk
- (United States) Paul Arriola
- (United States) Bradford Jamieson IV
- (United States) Maki Tall
- (Uruguay) Franco Acosta
- (Uruguay) Gastón Pereiro
- (Uruguay) Mathías Suárez
- (Uzbekistan) Mirjamol Kosimov

1 own goal

- (Germany) Marvin Schwäbe (playing against Honduras)
- (Honduras) Kevin Álvarez (playing against Fiji)
- (Hungary) Attila Talabér (playing against Serbia)
- (North Korea) Min Hyo-song (playing against Brazil)
- (Panama) Chin Hormechea (playing against Austria)
- (Senegal) Andelinou Correa (playing against Brazil)

Source: FIFA.com

== Final ranking ==
As per statistical convention in football, matches decided in extra time are counted as wins and losses, while matches decided by penalty shoot-outs are counted as draws.

Pos	Team	Pld	W	D	L	GF	GA	GD	Pts	Final result
1	Serbia	7	5	1	1	10	4	+6	16	Champions
2	Brazil	7	4	2	1	15	5	+10	14	Runners-up
3	Mali	7	3	2	2	11	7	+4	11	Third place
4	Senegal	7	2	2	3	6	14	−8	8	Fourth place
5	Germany	5	4	1	0	18	3	+15	13	Eliminated in Quarter-finals
6	Portugal	5	4	1	0	12	2	+10	13	Eliminated in Quarter-finals
7	United States	5	3	1	1	7	4	+3	10	Eliminated in Quarter-finals
8	Uzbekistan	5	2	0	3	8	8	0	6	Eliminated in Quarter-finals
9	Ukraine	4	2	2	0	10	1	+9	8	Eliminated in Round of 16
10	Ghana	4	2	1	1	5	6	−1	7	Eliminated in Round of 16
11	Nigeria	4	2	0	2	8	5	+3	6	Eliminated in Round of 16
12	Uruguay	4	1	2	1	3	3	0	5	Eliminated in Round of 16
13	Austria	4	1	2	1	3	4	−1	5	Eliminated in Round of 16
14	New Zealand (H)	4	1	1	2	6	7	−1	4	Eliminated in Round of 16
15	Colombia	4	1	1	2	3	5	−2	4	Eliminated in Round of 16
16	Hungary	4	1	0	3	7	7	0	3	Eliminated in Round of 16
17	Mexico	3	1	0	2	2	5	−3	3	Eliminated in Group stage
18	Honduras	3	1	0	2	5	11	−6	3	Eliminated in Group stage
19	Fiji	3	1	0	2	4	11	−7	3	Eliminated in Group stage
20	Argentina	3	0	2	1	4	5	−1	2	Eliminated in Group stage
21	Panama	3	0	1	2	3	5	−2	1	Eliminated in Group stage
22	Qatar	3	0	0	3	1	7	−6	0	Eliminated in Group stage
23	Myanmar	3	0	0	3	2	13	−11	0	Eliminated in Group stage
24	North Korea	3	0	0	3	1	12	−11	0	Eliminated in Group stage

Source: Techn. Report p. 85
(H) Hosts

== Organization ==
=== Emblem and mascot ===
The official emblem of the tournament was unveiled on 20 November 2013. The official mascot, a black sheep named Wooliam, was unveiled on 11 November 2014.

=== Ticketing ===
Prior to being released for 'General sale' on 13 June 2014, registered footballers in New Zealand were given 'priority treatment' by allowing them the option to buy tickets from two months earlier.

In the first three months of tickets going on sale to residents, an estimated 25,000 were sold.

== See also ==
- 2015 Under-20 Five Nations Series - preparatory tournament for the U-20 World Cup
