= Aboubacar Doumbia =

Aboubacar Doumbia may refer to:

- Abou Nidal, singer of Ivory Coast, also known as Aboubacar Doumbia
- Aboubacar Doumbia (footballer, born 19 April 1995), Malian football midfielder
- Aboubacar Doumbia (footballer, born 21 November 1995), Malian football goalkeeper
- Aboubacar Doumbia (footballer, born 1999), Ivorian football forward
