= El Hadj Malick Niang =

Senegalese footballer

Personal information
- Date of birth: 9 December 1995 (age 30)
- Place of birth: Dakar, Senegal
- Height: 1.86 m (6 ft 1 in)
- Position: Forward

Senior career*
Years	Team	Apps	(Gls)
2012–2016	US Gorée		
2015–2016	→ Arles-Avignon B (loan)	2	(0)

International career
2014–2015	Senegal U20	11	(1)
2013	Senegal	1	(0)
Medal record
Men's football
Representing Senegal
FIFA U-20 World Cup
Third place	2015 New Zealand
- * Club domestic league appearances and goals

El Hadj Malick Niang (born 9 December 1995) is a Senegalese footballer who plays as a forward.
