= Dieudonné Gbakle =

Malian footballer

Personal information
- Full name: Bi Dieudonné Gbaklé
- Date of birth: 20 December 1995 (age 30)
- Place of birth: Bingerville, Ivory Coast
- Height: 1.73 m (5 ft 8 in)
- Position: Winger

Youth career
- –2012: JMG Football Bamako
- 2012–2013: Bakaridjan

Senior career*
Years	Team	Apps	(Gls)
2013–2015	Bakaridjan		
2015	Lille B	3	(0)
2015–2016	Metz	12	(0)
2016	→ Metz B	1	(0)
2016–2017	Gençlerbirliği	0	(0)
2016–2017	→ Manisaspor (loan)	5	(0)
2017–2018	Pau	27	(3)
2017–2018	→ Pau B	3	(1)
2019	Zagreb	5	(0)

International career^{‡}
2015	Mali U20	7	(2)
Medal record
Representing Mali
FIFA U-20 World Cup
Third place	2015 New Zealand	U-20 Team
- * Club domestic league appearances and goals as of 8 March 2019 ‡ National team caps and goals as of 20 June 2015

Dieudonné Gbakle (born 20 December 1995) is a professional footballer who plays as a winger. Born in Ivory Coast, he has represented Mali at youth level.
