= Fahad Al-Mirdasi =

Saudi Arabian football referee

- Full name: Fahad Bin Adwan Al-Mirdasi
- Born: 16 August 1985 (age 41); Riyadh, Saudi Arabia

International
Years	League	Role
2011–2018	FIFA listed	Referee

Fahad Al-Mirdasi (Arabic: فهد المرداسي; born 16 August 1985) is a Saudi Arabian football referee who served as a full international for FIFA from 2011 to 2018, when he was banned for life for match fixing.

== Refereeing career ==
Al-Mirdasi was one of the referees for the 2015 AFC Asian Cup. He officiated four games in the 2015 FIFA U-20 World Cup, including the final game.

Al-Mirdasi officiated at the men's football tournament at the 2016 Summer Olympics. He officiated the match between Sweden and Colombia in the group stage, with the game ending with a score of 2–2.

In 2017, Al-Mirdasi officiated at the 2017 FIFA Confederations Cup.

In 2018, the Saudi Arabian Football Federation (SAFF) issued Al-Mirdasi a lifetime ban from officiating based on allegations of match-fixing. Before the ban, FIFA had selected Al-Mirdasi to officiate at the 2018 FIFA World Cup, but on 30 May 2018, it was announced that he and his assistants were stood down from participating in the World Cup.
