= Staniša Mandić =

Montenegrin footballer

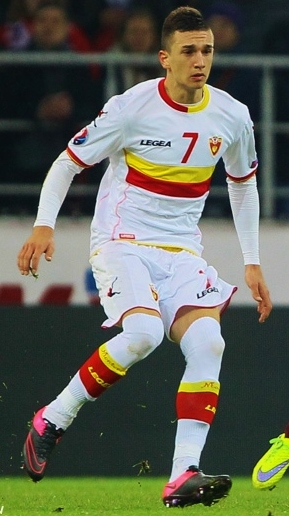
- Mandić with Montenegro in 2015

Personal information
- Full name: Staniša Mandić
- Date of birth: 27 January 1995 (age 31)
- Place of birth: Herceg Novi, FR Yugoslavia
- Height: 1.84 m (6 ft 1/2 in)
- Position: Striker

Team information
- Current team: Arsenal Tivat
- Number: 77

Youth career
- Igalo
- Vojvodina
- Rad
- Čukarički

Senior career*
Years	Team	Apps	(Gls)
2014–2018	Čukarički	59	(2)
2017–2018	→ Sogndal (loan)	22	(5)
2018–2019	Sogndal	12	(0)
2019	→ Zrinjski Mostar (loan)	26	(4)
2020–2021	Mura	26	(4)
2022	Metalac Gornji Milanovac	11	(1)
2022–2023	East Riffa Club		
2023	GOŠK Gabela	17	(1)
2024	Wuxi Wugo	29	(2)
2025–	Arsenal Tivat	47	(1)

International career
2013–2014	Serbia U19	8	(2)
2014–2015	Serbia U20	12	(3)
2016–2017	Montenegro U21	2	(0)
2015	Montenegro	4	(0)
Medal record
Men's football
Representing Serbia
FIFA U20 World Cup
Winner	2015 New Zealand
- * Club domestic league appearances and goals as of 1 June 2025

Staniša Mandić (Serbian Cyrillic: Станиша Мандић; born 27 January 1995) is a Montenegrin professional footballer who plays as a striker for Arsenal Tivat.

He used to represent Serbia at Under-19 and Under-20 level, but at full international level, Mandić represented Montenegro in 2015, making 4 appearances.

== Club career ==
Mandić made his first team debut with Čukarički in a 1–0 home league win over Napredak Kruševac on 6 April 2014. He scored his first competitive goal for the club in a 1–4 away loss against Red Star Belgrade on 12 April 2014. That was his only goal in four league appearances in the 2013–14 season. Mandić also won the 2014–15 Serbian Cup, the first major trophy in the club's history. In a match against Ordabasy, played on 7 July 2016, Mandić noted 2 goals and an assist after 382 days without a goal.

In the summer of 2017, Mandić moved on a one-year loan to Sogndal. In June 2018 it had been announced Sogndal purchased the contract with Mandić. In the summer of 2018 Mandić moved permanently to Sogndal on a three-years contract.

On 20 February 2019, Mandić moved on a one-year loan to HŠK Zrinjski Mostar in the Premier League of Bosnia and Herzegovina. He made his debut for Zrinjski in a 0–1 home loss to FK Sarajevo in the 2018–19 Bosnian Cup. Mandić scored his first goal for Zrinjski in a 0–1 away win against FK Sarajevo in the 2018–19 Bosnian Premier League season.

On 14 February 2024, Mandić signed with China League One club Wuxi Wugo.

== International career ==
Mandić represented Serbia at the 2014 UEFA Under-19 Championship. He scored the winning goal in the 90th minute against Bulgaria, taking the team to the semi-finals of the tournament, as well as securing them a spot at the 2015 FIFA U-20 World Cup. After returning from the U20 World Cup in New Zealand, Serbia U21 coach Tomislav Sivić made his squad for the 2017 UEFA Euro U21 qualifiers, which did not include Mandić. Vladimir Matijašević, Čukarički's sports director, wrote a letter to Sivić which garnered national publicity when he suggested that Sivić was selecting players for the U21 team based on their agents and not their qualities as players.

On 31 August 2015, Mandić announced that he accepted an invitation from the Football Association of Montenegro to play for the Montenegro national team. He made his senior debut for them in a September 2015 European Championship qualification match against Moldova and has earned a total of 4 caps, scoring no goals. His final international was a November 2015 friendly match against Macedonia.

== Career statistics ==
=== Club ===
As of end of 2021–22 season

Appearances and goals by club, season and competition
Club	Season	League			Cup		Continental		Other		Total	
Club	Season	Division	Apps	Goals	Apps	Goals	Apps	Goals	Apps	Goals	Apps	Goals
Čukarički	2013–14	Serbian SuperLiga	4	1	—		—		—		4	1
Čukarički	2014–15	Serbian SuperLiga	17	1	4	1	1	0	—		22	2
Čukarički	2015–16	Serbian SuperLiga	28	0	2	0	3	0	—		33	0
Čukarički	2016–17	Serbian SuperLiga	10	0	2	1	4	2	—		16	3
Čukarički	Total		59	2	8	2	8	2	—		75	6
Sogndal	2017 (loan)	Eliteserien	8	1	—		—		2 (Note: Both appearances in the relegation play-offs)	0	10	1
Sogndal	2018	OBOS-ligaen	26	4	1	0	—		—		27	4
Sogndal	Total		34	5	1	0	—		2	0	37	5
Zrinjski Mostar (loan)	2018–19	Bosnian Premier League	10	3	1	0	—		—		11	3
Zrinjski Mostar (loan)	2019–20	Bosnian Premier League	16	1	2	1	6	3	—		24	5
Zrinjski Mostar (loan)	Total		26	4	3	1	6	3	—		35	8
Mura	2019–20	PrvaLiga	9	1	2	0	—		—		11	1
Mura	2020–21	PrvaLiga	6	3	0	0	0	0	—		6	3
Mura	2020–21	PrvaLiga	11	0	0	0	9	0	—		20	1
Mura	Total		26	4	2	0	9	0	—		37	4
Metalac	2021–22	SuperLiga	11	1	2	0	—		—		13	1
Career total			156	16	16	3	23	5	2	0	197	24

=== International ===
As of match played 12 November 2015.

Montenegro
Year	Apps	Goals
2015	4	0
Total	4	0

== Honours ==
Čukarički

- Serbian Cup: 2014–15

Mura

- Slovenian Cup : 2019–20

Serbia

- FIFA U-20 World Cup: 2015 (match vs Brazil)
