= Nemanja Kos =

Serbian association football player

Personal information
- Date of birth: 30 November 2002 (age 23)
- Place of birth: Smederevo, FR Yugoslavia
- Height: 1.85 m (6 ft 1 in)
- Position: Forward

Team information
- Current team: Mihajlovac

Youth career
- Mladost Lučani

Senior career*
Years	Team	Apps	(Gls)
2020–2024	Mladost Lučani	23	(2)
2022	→ Mladi Radnik (loan)		
2022	→ Mihajlovac (loan)		
2023	→ Sloga 33 (loan)		
2024-	Mihajlovac		

International career
2021	Serbia U19	2	(0)
2021	Serbia U20	1	(0)
- * Club domestic league appearances and goals as of 16:26, 26 May 2024 (UTC)

Nemanja Kos (Serbian Cyrillic: Немања Кос, born 30 November 2002) is a Serbian footballer who currently plays as a forward for OFK Mihajlovac.

== Career statistics ==
=== Club ===
As of 7 June 2020.

Club	Season	League			Cup		Continental		Other		Total	
Club	Season	Division	Apps	Goals	Apps	Goals	Apps	Goals	Apps	Goals	Apps	Goals
Mladost Lučani	2019–20	Serbian SuperLiga	1	0	0	0	0	0	0	0	1	0
Career total			1	0	0	0	0	0	0	0	1	0
