= Serbia national under-20 football team =

National association football team

Serbia U20
- Nickname: Orlići (The Young Eagles)
- Association: Football Association of Serbia
- Confederation: UEFA (Europe)
- Head coach: Aleksandar Rogić
- Most caps: Nemanja Antonov, Saša Zdjelar, Staniša Mandić (12)
- Top scorer: Nemanja Maksimović (4)
- FIFA code: SRB
First colours	Second colours

First international
- United Arab Emirates 1–1 Serbia (SC Stadium, Qatar; 11 January 2009)

Biggest win
- Serbia 6–0 Myanmar (Čukarički Stadium, Serbia; 26 March 2015)

Biggest defeat
- Hungary 3–1 Serbia (Hungary; 14 October 2011)

FIFA U-20 World Cup
- Appearances: 1 (first in 2015)
- Best result: Winners (2015)

The Serbia national under-20 football team (Serbian Latin: Omladinska reprezentacija Srbije) is the national under-20 football team of Serbia. Like the senior national team, it is controlled by the Football Association of Serbia. On 2015 FIFA U-20 World Cup in New Zealand Serbia U20 won the final against Brazil 2–1, becoming the first team representing the country to win a FIFA competition title since their independence from Yugoslavia and the dissolution of Serbia and Montenegro. Yugoslavia U20 previously won the 1987 FIFA World Youth Championship.

== History ==
=== Yugoslavia (1977–1992) ===
Yugoslavia Under-20 had appeared at two World Youth Championships throughout their existence. Their first appearance came at the 1979 tournament, where they were knocked out in the group stage after two defeats (0–2 against Poland and 0–1 against Argentina) and one win (5–0 against Indonesia). Their second appearance in the 1987 tournament was much more successful, as they won the competition, remarkably defeating each of the three other semi-finalists and eliminating the defending champions Brazil during the course of the tournament, with Robert Prosinečki, half Serb-half Croatian, winning the Golden Ball award for Best Player of the tournament.

=== Serbia and Montenegro (1992–2006) ===
FR Yugoslavia/Serbia and Montenegro under-20 team did not qualify for World Youth Championships.

=== Serbia (since 2006) ===
Serbia first appearance as independent country came at the 2015 tournament in New Zealand, where they won the competition.

== Competitive Record ==
Champions Runners-Up Third Place Fourth Place

=== FIFA U-20 World Cup Record ===
The FIFA U-20 World Cup, until 2005 known as the FIFA World Youth Championship, is the world championship of football for players under the age of 20 and is organized by FIFA.

Played as	Year	Result	GP	W	D*	L	GS	GA
(Socialist Federal Republic of Yugoslavia) YUG	(Tunisia) 1977	Did not qualify						
(Socialist Federal Republic of Yugoslavia) YUG	(Japan) 1979	Group Stage	3	1	0	2	5	3
(Socialist Federal Republic of Yugoslavia) YUG	(Australia) 1981	Did not qualify						
(Socialist Federal Republic of Yugoslavia) YUG	(Mexico) 1983	Did not qualify						
(Socialist Federal Republic of Yugoslavia) YUG	(Soviet Union) 1985	Did not qualify						
(Socialist Federal Republic of Yugoslavia) YUG	(Chile) 1987	Champions	6	5	1	0	17	6
(Socialist Federal Republic of Yugoslavia) YUG	(Saudi Arabia) 1989	Did not qualify						
(Socialist Federal Republic of Yugoslavia) YUG	(Portugal) 1991	Did not qualify						
(Serbia and Montenegro) SCG	(Australia) 1993	Banned						
(Serbia and Montenegro) SCG	(Qatar) 1995	Banned						
(Serbia and Montenegro) SCG	(Malaysia) 1997	Did not qualify						
(Serbia and Montenegro) SCG	(Nigeria) 1999	Did not qualify						
(Serbia and Montenegro) SCG	(Argentina) 2001	Did not qualify						
(Serbia and Montenegro) SCG	(United Arab Emirates) 2003	Did not qualify						
(Serbia and Montenegro) SCG	(Netherlands) 2005	Did not qualify						
(Serbia) SRB	(Canada) 2007	Did not qualify						
(Serbia) SRB	(Egypt) 2009	Did not qualify						
(Serbia) SRB	(Colombia) 2011	Did not qualify						
(Serbia) SRB	(Turkey) 2013	Did not qualify						
(Serbia) SRB	(New Zealand) 2015	Champions	7	5	1	1	10	4
(Serbia) SRB	(South Korea) 2017	Did not qualify						
(Serbia) SRB	(Poland) 2019	Did not qualify						
(Serbia) SRB	(Indonesia) 2021	Canceled						
(Serbia) SRB	(Argentina) 2023	Did not qualify						
(Serbia) SRB	(Chile) 2025	Did not qualify						
(Serbia) SRB	(Azerbaijan) (Uzbekistan) 2027	To be determined						
(Serbia) SRB	(Armenia) (Georgia (country)) 2029	To be determined						
Total		3/26	16	11	2	3	32	13

== Honours ==
=== Titles ===
- FIFA U-20 World Cup:
  - 1987
  - 2015

=== Individual awards ===
- FIFA World Youth Championship Golden Ball
  - Robert Prosinečki – 1987
- FIFA World Youth Championship Silver Ball
  - Zvonimir Boban – 1987
- FIFA U-20 World Cup Bronze Ball
  - Sergej Milinković-Savić – 2015
- FIFA U-20 World Cup Golden Glove
  - Predrag Rajković – 2015
- FIFA World Youth Championship Silver Shoe
  - Davor Šuker – 1987

== 2015 coaching staff ==
Serbian coaching staff
- Head coach: (Serbia) Veljko Paunović
- Coach: (Serbia) Marko Mitrović
- Coach: (Serbia) Milan Kosanović
- Coach: (Serbia) Nikola Leposavić
- Goalkeeping coach: (Serbia) Aleksandar Sarić
- Fitness coach: (Serbia) Petar Milcanović
- Doctor: (Serbia) Dr. Pavle Maksimović
- Physiotherapist: (Serbia) Viktor Vujošević
- Physiotherapist: (Serbia) Srđan Branković
- Kitman: (Serbia) Nenad Dragaš
- Team manager: (Serbia) Dušan Gelić
- Media officer: Igor Gacic

== Squad ==
- The following players were called up for the friendly match against Italy on 6 September 2021.

Caps and goals updated as of 6 September 2021 after the game against Italy.

No.	Pos.	Player	Date of birth (age)	Caps	Goals	Club
	GK	Novak Mićović	25 October 2001 (age 25)	1	0	(Football Association of Serbia) Čukarički
	GK	Andrija Katić	17 February 2002 (age 24)	1	0	(Football Association of Serbia) Voždovac
	GK	Filip Stanković	25 February 2002 (age 24)	0	0	(Royal Dutch Football Association) Volendam
	DF	Viktor Rogan	12 December 2002 (age 23)	1	1	(Football Association of Serbia) Čukarički
	DF	Strahinja Eraković	21 January 2001 (age 25)	1	0	(Football Association of Serbia) Red Star Belgrade
	DF	Ilija Milićević	20 June 2001 (age 25)	1	0	(Football Association of Serbia) Metalac Gornji Milanovac
	DF	Damjan Pavlović	9 July 2001 (age 25)	1	0	(Royal Belgian Football Association) Standard Liège
	DF	Filip Bačkulja	25 June 2002 (age 24)	1	0	(Football Association of Serbia) Metalac Gornji Milanovac
	DF	Vukašin Krstić	13 April 2003 (age 23)	1	0	(Football Association of Serbia) TSC Bačka Topola
	DF	Uroš Blagojević	21 March 2002 (age 24)	0	0	Free agent
	DF	Uroš Drezgić	4 October 2002 (age 24)	0	0	(Football Association of Serbia) Čukarički
	MF	Bogdan Jočić	11 January 2001 (age 25)	1	0	(Football Association of Serbia) Voždovac
	MF	Dragoljub Savić	25 April 2001 (age 25)	1	0	(Austrian Football Association) Rapid Wien
	MF	Jovan Lukić	20 January 2002 (age 24)	1	0	(Football Association of Serbia) Čukarički
	MF	Vladan Novevski	13 May 2002 (age 24)	1	0	(Football Association of Serbia) Vojvodina
	MF	Vladimir Lučić	28 June 2002 (age 24)	1	0	(Football Association of Serbia) Čukarički
	MF	Stefan Mitrović	15 August 2002 (age 24)	1	0	(Football Association of Serbia) Red Star Belgrade
	MF	Miloš Pantović	24 August 2002 (age 24)	1	0	(Football Association of Serbia) Voždovac
	MF	Aleksa Đurasović	23 December 2002 (age 23)	1	0	(Football Association of Serbia) Spartak Subotica
	FW	Slobodan Stanojlović	28 December 2001 (age 24)	1	0	(Football Association of Serbia) TSC
	FW	Andrija Radulović	3 July 2002 (age 24)	1	0	(Football Association of Serbia) Mladost Novi Sad
	FW	Nemanja Kos	30 November 2002 (age 23)	1	0	(Football Association of Serbia) OFK Mihajlovac

=== Previous squads ===
- 1979 FIFA World Youth Championship squads – Yugoslavia
- 1987 FIFA World Youth Championship squads – Yugoslavia
- 2015 FIFA World Youth Championship squads – Serbia

== Head coaches ==
Years	Name
2021−	(Serbia) Aleksandar Rogić
2017	(Serbia) Ilija Petković
2016–2017	(Serbia) Nenad Lalatović
2014–2015	(Serbia) Veljko Paunović
2011–2012	(Serbia) Dejan Govedarica
1987	(Socialist Federal Republic of Yugoslavia) Mirko Jozić
1979	(Socialist Federal Republic of Yugoslavia) Ivan Toplak

== Player statistics ==
Statistics include players who have played for the Serbia since 2006.

Most appearances As of 20 June 2015
#	Name	National team career	Caps	Goals
1	Staniša Mandić	2014–2015	12	3
1	Nemanja Antonov	2014–2015	12	0
1	Saša Zdjelar	2014–2015	12	0
4	Nemanja Maksimović	2014–2015	11	4
4	Sergej Milinković-Savić	2014–2015	11	1

Most goals As of 20 June 2015
#	Name	National team career	Goals	Caps	Average
1	Nemanja Maksimović	2014–2015	4	11	0.36
2	Stefan Ilić	2015	3	5	0.60
2	Staniša Mandić	2014–2015	3	12	0.25
4	Ivan Šaponjić	2015–	2	8	0.25
4	Andrija Živković	2015–	2	9	0.22

== Head-to-head record ==
The following table shows Serbia's head-to-head record in FIFA U-20 World Cup.

Opponent	Pld	W	D	L	GF	GA	GD	Win %
Argentina	1	0	0	1	0	1	−1	0.00
Australia	1	1	0	0	4	0	+4	100.00
Brazil	2	2	0	0	4	2	+2	100.00
Chile	1	1	0	0	4	2	+2	100.00
East Germany	1	1	0	0	2	1	+1	100.00
Germany	1	0	1	0	1	1	+0	0.00
Hungary	1	1	0	0	2	1	+1	100.00
Indonesia	1	1	0	0	5	0	+5	100.00
Mali	2	2	0	0	4	1	+3	100.00
Mexico	1	1	0	0	2	0	+2	100.00
Poland	1	0	0	1	0	2	−2	0.00
Togo	1	1	0	0	4	1	+3	100.00
United States	1	0	1	0	0	0	+0	0.00
Uruguay	1	0	0	1	0	1	−1	0.00
Total	16	11	2	3	32	13	+19	68.75

== See also ==
- Serbia national football team
- Serbia national under-21 football team
- Serbia national under-19 football team
- Serbia national under-17 football team
- Yugoslavia national under-20 football team
