= Nemanja Maksimović =

Serbian footballer

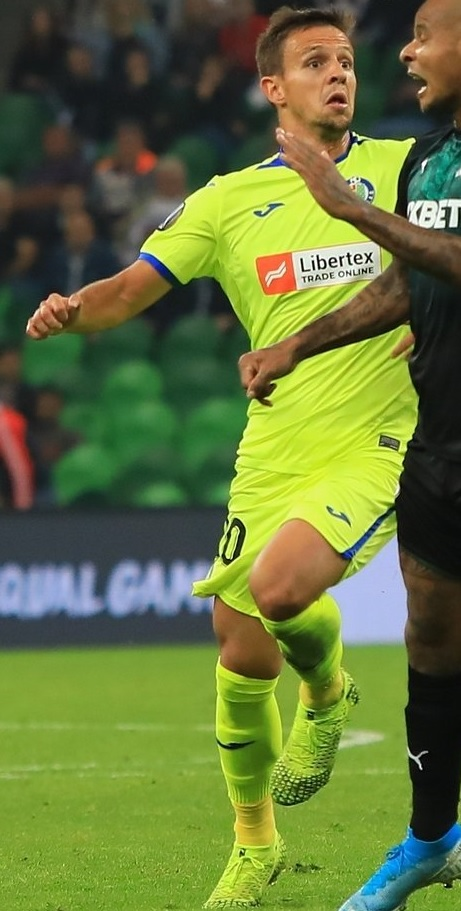
- Maksimović with Getafe in 2019

Personal information
- Full name: Nemanja Maksimović
- Date of birth: 26 January 1995 (age 31)
- Place of birth: Banja Koviljača, Serbia, FR Yugoslavia
- Height: 1.85 m (6 ft 1 in)
- Position: Central midfielder

Team information
- Current team: Shabab Al Ahli
- Number: 88

Youth career
- Gučevo Banja Koviljača
- 2002–2007: Omladinac Loznica
- 2007–2013: Red Star Belgrade
- 2013: Hellas Verona
- 2013: Domžale

Senior career*
Years	Team	Apps	(Gls)
2013–2015	Domžale	27	(3)
2015–2017	Astana	54	(9)
2017–2018	Valencia	15	(0)
2018–2024	Getafe	207	(9)
2024–2025	Panathinaikos	27	(3)
2025–	Shabab Al Ahli	23	(0)

International career^{‡}
2013–2014	Serbia U19	16	(3)
2015	Serbia U20	7	(2)
2015–2017	Serbia U21	9	(0)
2016–	Serbia	65	(1)
Medal record
Men's Football
Representing Serbia
FIFA U-20 World Cup
Gold medal – first place	2015 New Zealand	Team
UEFA U-19 Championship
Gold medal – first place	2013 Lithuania	Team
- * Club domestic league appearances and goals as of 11 November 2026 ‡ National team caps and goals as of 16 November 2026

Nemanja Maksimović (Serbian Cyrillic: Немања Максимовић, pronounced [němaɲa maksǐːmoʋitɕ]; born 26 January 1995) is a Serbian professional footballer who plays as a central midfielder for UAE Pro League club Shabab Al Ahli and the Serbia national team.

== Club career ==
=== Early career ===
Born in Banja Koviljača, Maksimović played for Red Star Belgrade's youth selection teams up until the under-19 level, but eventually had his contract terminated. After his display at the 2013 UEFA U19 Championship, he signed with Slovenian side Domžale. He made his professional debut on 18 October 2013 in a 2–2 draw with Zavrč.

=== Astana ===
On 7 February 2015, Maksimović signed a two-and-a-half-year contract with Astana of the Kazakhstan Premier League. On 27 August 2015, Maksimović scored the equalizing goal against APOEL in the second leg of the 2015–16 UEFA Champions League play-offs, which qualified Astana to their first ever Champions League group stage campaign.

=== Valencia ===
On 2 July 2017, Valencia announced the signing of Maksimović on a contract until 2022. He made his debut for the club on 18 August, coming on as a late substitute for Carlos Soler in a 1–0 La Liga home win against Las Palmas.

=== Getafe ===
On 16 July 2018, Maksimović signed with Getafe until 2024.

=== Panathinaikos ===
Nemanja Maksimović officially signed a three-year contract with Panathinaikos in January 2024, as confirmed by the club, and the transfer was set to run through the summer of 2027. Although he signed in January, the agreement was structured to take effect on 1 July 2024, once his obligations with Getafe concluded. The move was completed on a free transfer, as Getafe let him go upon contract expiry, meaning Panathinaikos didn’t pay a transfer fee.

=== Shabab Al Ahli ===
Nemanja Maksimović officially became a player of Shabab Al Ahli Club, transferring from Panathinaikos. The 30-year-old Serbian midfielder, who had signed for Panathinaikos as a free agent, departed after one season. Panathinaikos received a reported transfer fee of €5 million.

== International career ==
Maksimović played for the Serbia U19 team that won the 2013 UEFA European Under-19 Championship. He was named to Serbia's U20 squad for the 2015 FIFA U-20 World Cup in New Zealand, scoring the winner with two minutes of extra-time remaining in the final, beating Brazil 2–1 for Serbia's first international honour as an independent nation. Maksimović made his debut for Serbia on 23 March 2016, in a 1–0 defeat to Poland. In May 2018 he was named in Serbia's preliminary squad for the 2018 FIFA World Cup in Russia, but he wasn't selected for the final squad.

In November 2022, he was selected in Serbia's squad for the 2022 FIFA World Cup in Qatar. He played in all three group stage matches, against Brazil, Cameroon, and Switzerland. Serbia finished fourth in the group.

Maksimović was selected in Serbia's squad for the UEFA Euro 2024, but didn't make any appearances in the tournament.

== Career statistics ==
=== Club ===
As of match played 11 May 2025

Appearances and goals by club, season and competition
Club	Season	League			National cup (Note: Includes Slovenian Football Cup, Kazakhstan Cup, Copa del Rey, Greek Football Cup)		Europe		Other		Total	
Club	Season	Division	Apps	Goals	Apps	Goals	Apps	Goals	Apps	Goals	Apps	Goals
Domžale	2013–14	Slovenian PrvaLiga	11	0	0	0	0	0	—		11	0
Domžale	2014–15	Slovenian PrvaLiga	16	3	3	1	—		—		19	4
Domžale	Total		27	3	3	1	—		—		30	4
Astana	2015	Kazakhstan Premier League	23	6	3	0	11 (Note: Appearances in UEFA Champions League)	1	1 (Note: Appearance in Kazakhstan Super Cup)	0	38	7
Astana	2016	Kazakhstan Premier League	31	3	1	0	10 (Note: Three appearances in UEFA Champions League, seven appearances and two goals in UEFA Europa League)	2	1	0	43	5
Astana	2017	Kazakhstan Premier League	0	0	0	0	0	0	0	0	0	0
Astana	Total		54	9	4	0	21	3	2	0	81	12
Valencia	2017–18	La Liga	15	0	6	1	—		—		21	1
Getafe	2018–19	La Liga	36	1	4	0	—		—		40	1
Getafe	2019–20	La Liga	35	2	1	0	7 (Note: Appearances in UEFA Europa League)	0	—		43	2
Getafe	2020–21	La Liga	35	1	0	0	—		—		35	1
Getafe	2021–22	La Liga	35	1	0	0	—		—		35	1
Getafe	2022–23	La Liga	29	0	0	0	—		—		29	0
Getafe	2023–24	La Liga	37	4	3	0	—		—		40	4
Getafe	Total		207	9	8	0	7	0	—		222	9
Panathinaikos	2024–25	Super League Greece	27	3	4	0	15 (Note: Four appearances in UEFA Europa League, eleven appearances and one goal in UEFA Conference League)	1	—		46	4
Career total			330	24	25	2	43	4	2	0	400	30

=== International ===
As of match played 16 November 2026

Appearances and goals by national team and year
National team	Year	Apps	Goals
Serbia	2016	3	0
Serbia	2017	1	0
Serbia	2018	7	0
Serbia	2019	8	0
Serbia	2020	7	0
Serbia	2021	11	0
Serbia	2022	6	0
Serbia	2023	5	0
Serbia	2024	5	0
Serbia	2025	7	1
Serbia	2026	5	0
Total		65	1

Scores and results list Serbia's goal tally first, score column indicates score after each Maksimović goal.

List of international goals scored by Nemanja Maksimović
No.	Date	Venue	Cap	Opponent	Score	Result	Competition
1	23 March 2025	Rajko Mitić Stadium, Belgrade, Serbia	55	Austria	1–0	2–0	2024–25 UEFA Nations League promotion/relegation play-offs

== Honours ==
Astana

- Kazakhstan Premier League: 2015, 2016
- Kazakhstan Cup: 2016
- Kazakhstan Super Cup: 2015

Serbia U19

- UEFA European U-19 Championship: 2013

Serbia U20

- FIFA U-20 World Cup: 2015

Orders

- Medal of Merit (Republika Srpska)
