= Alhassane Sylla =

Senegalese footballer (born 2003)

Personal information
- Date of birth: 24 August 1995 (age 31)
- Place of birth: Dakar, Senegal
- Height: 1.77 m (5 ft 10 in)
- Position: Left-back

Youth career
- Diambars

Senior career*
| Years | Team | Apps | (Gls) |
| 2011–2017 | Diambars | | |
| 2017–2020 | União da Madeira | 31 | (2) |
| 2018–2019 | →Famalicão (loan) | 13 | (0) |
| 2020 | Cova da Piedade | 7 | (0) |
| 2020–2021 | Annecy | 5 | (1) |
| 2021–2022 | Rio Ave | 15 | (0) |
| 2022–2024 | Moreirense | 0 | (0) |

International career^{‡}
| 2016 | Senegal U20 | 11 | (1) |
| 2015 | Senegal U23 | 1 | (0) |
| 2016 | Senegal | 1 | (0) |
- * Club domestic league appearances and goals as of 20 August 2025 ‡ National team caps and goals as of 04:04, 27 February 2025 (UTC)

Alhassane Sylla (born 24 August 1995) is a Senegalese retired professional footballer who played left-back for the Senegal national team.

== Career ==
A youth product of the Senegalese club Diambars, Sylla began his senior career with them in 2011 and helped them win the 2013 Senegalese Ligue 1. In 31 July 2017, he moved to Portugal with União da Madeira in the Liga Portugal 2. He went on loan to Famalicão for the 2018–19 season before returning to União, and in 2020 had a short stint with Cova da Piedade. On 23 September 2020, he joined the French club Annecy in the Championnat National. On 24 August 2021, he returned to Portugal with Rio Ave. After winning the 2021–22 Liga Portugal 2 season with Rio Ave, on 4 July 2024 he signed with Moreirense on a 2-year contract. A couple weeks into preseason with Moreirense, Sylla was sidelined with a ligament injury in his right knee.

== International career ==
Born in Senegal, Sylla is of Guinean descent. He was called up to the Senegal U20s for the 2015 African U-20 Championship where they were finalists, and then played for the U20s at the 2015 FIFA U-20 World Cup. He played for the Senegal U23s at the 2015 U-23 Africa Cup of Nations. On 10 February 2016, he debuted with the senior Senegal national team in a friendly 2–0 loss to Mexico.

== Honours ==
Diambars

- Senegal Ligue 1: 2013

Rio Ave

- Liga Portugal 2: 2021–22

Moreirense

- Liga Portugal 2: 2022–23
