= 2015 Under-20 Five Nations Series =

The 2015 Under-20 Five Nations Series was a preparatory tournament for the 2015 FIFA U-20 World Cup. All games were played in New Zealand.

3 May 2015
5:00 PM

New Zealand	2–3	Australia
Lewis 28'; Rufer 40'	Report	Woodcock 31'; Fofanah 58'; Blackwood 63'

QBE Stadium, Auckland
4 May 2015
1:00 PM

Qatar	2–4	Ghana
	Report

QBE Stadium, Auckland
7 May 2015
4:00 PM

Qatar	4–1	Australia
Afif 15'; Al Gabali 35'; Al Abdien 49', 58'	Report	Fofanah 53'

QBE Stadium, Auckland
5 July 2015
7:00 PM

New Zealand	2–1	Panama
	Report

QBE Stadium, Auckland
10 May 2015
1:00 PM

Panama	6–1	Australia
Small 5', 7', 40', 55'; Araya 45', 61'	Report	Kuzmanovski 30'

Waikato Stadium, Hamilton
10 May 2015
4:00 PM

New Zealand	v	Qatar

Waikato Stadium, Hamilton
10 May 2015

Ghana	v	NZ Invitation XI

Waikato Stadium, Hamilton
13 May 2015
1:00 PM

Qatar	v	Panama

Waikato Stadium, Hamilton
13 May 2015
4:00 PM

Ghana	2–0	Australia
Boateng 23'; Yeboah 28' (pen.)	Report

Waikato Stadium, Hamilton
