= 2015 FIFA U-20 World Cup final =

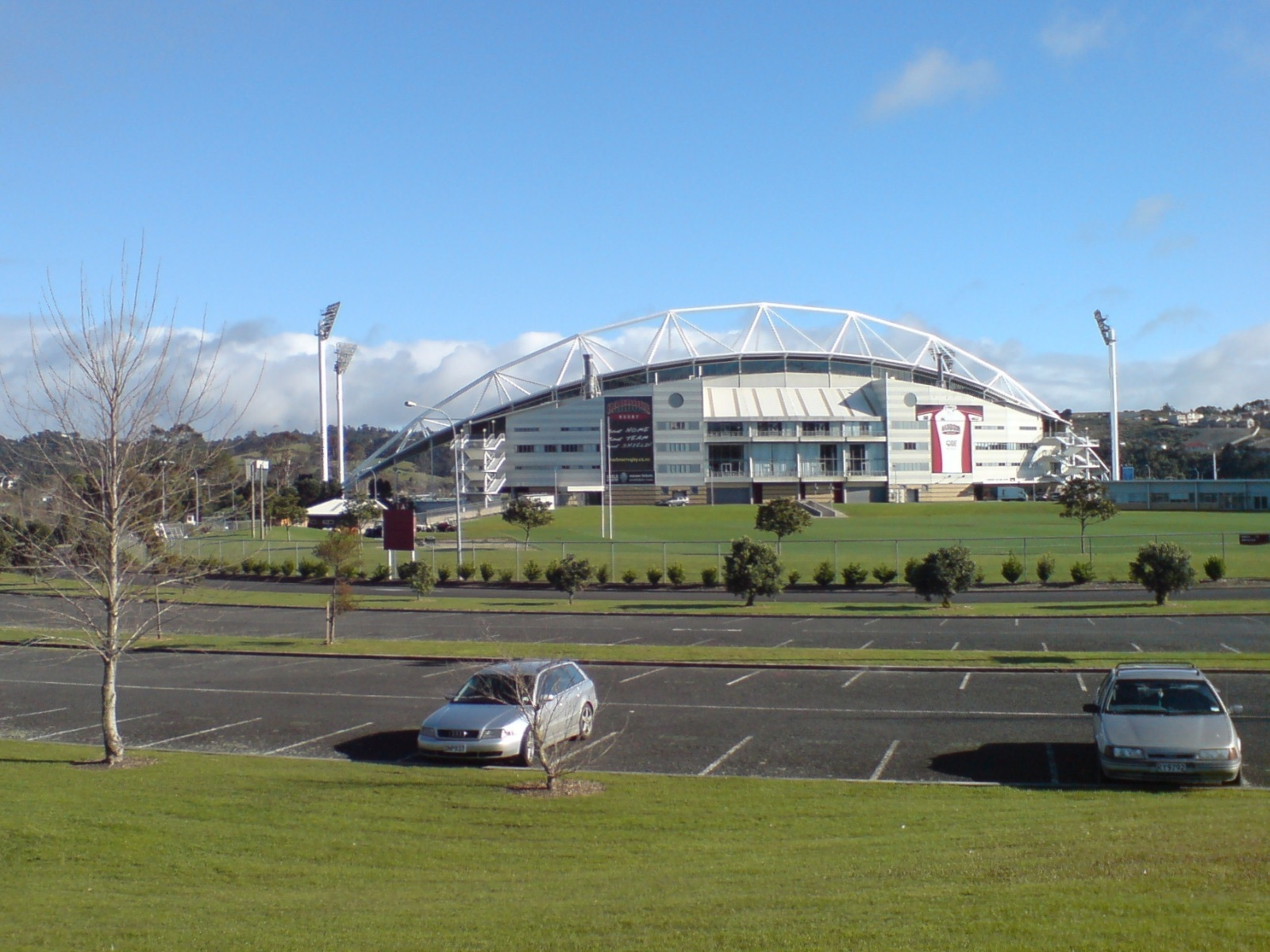
- North Harbour Stadium in 2007
- Event: 2015 FIFA U-20 World Cup
Brazil	Serbia
(Brazil)	(Serbia)
1	2
- Date: 20 June 2015
- Venue: North Harbour Stadium, Auckland
- Referee: Fahad Al-Mirdasi (Saudi Arabia)
- Attendance: 25,317

The final match of the 2015 FIFA U-20 World Cup was played on 20 June 2015 at North Harbour Stadium, in Auckland, New Zealand. The game was contested between Brazil and Serbia, with Serbia winning its first title since its independence, having previously won the 1987 FIFA World Youth Championship as part of the team of Yugoslavia.

== Background ==
Brazil results
Round	Opponent	Result
GS	Nigeria	4–2
GS	Hungary	2–1
GS	North Korea	3–0
R16	Uruguay	0–0 (5–4) pen.
QF	Portugal	0–0 (3–1) pen.
SF	Senegal	5–0

Serbia results
Round	Opponent	Result
GS	Uruguay	0–1
GS	Mali	2–0
GS	Mexico	2–0
R16	Hungary	2–1 a.e.t.
QF	United States	0–0 (6–5) pen.
SF	Mali	2–1 a.e.t.

Serbia, which had taken part in previous editions as part of Yugoslavia, made its debut at the FIFA U-20 World Cup in the tournament in New Zealand. On the other side, Brazil was seeking its sixth youth championship, having previously won the 2011 FIFA U-20 World Cup in Colombia. The South American team had qualified for the tournament by ending in fourth place at the 2015 South American U-20 Championship in Uruguay, while Serbia had made its way to the competition by classifying in the UEFA European Under-19 Championship the previous year in Hungary.

Sloted into Group D, Serbia had won its group by defeating Mali and Mexico after an initial 1–0 loss to Uruguay. In Group E, Brazil had made a perfect score by winning its three group stage matches against Nigeria, Hungary, and North Korea. Once in the knockout stage, Serbia reached the final by defeating Hungary, the United States and Mali in the round of 16, quarterfinals and semifinal, respectively. Brazil had gone past Uruguay, Portugal, and Senegal.

== Match ==
The final took place at North Harbour Stadium in Auckland, with an attendance of 25,317. The referee in charge of the match was Fahad Al-Mirdasi of Saudi Arabia, assisted by fellow Saudi Abdullah al-Shalwai and Abu Bakar al-Amri of Oman. The fourth official was Matthew Conger of New Zealand.

In total, Brazil maintained firm ball possession throughout the game, ending in a 63% vs 37% share and also executing nine corner kicks against two for Serbia. Referee al-Mirdasi showed one yellow card per side and sanctioned seventeen fouls by Brazil and fourteen by the Serbians. In its advances against Brazilian defences, Serbian players were sanctioned for offside a total of five times compared to two for the Brazilians.

The two goals which ended in a draw after full time came in the 70th minute for Brazil and in the 73rd minute for Serbia. Andreas Pereira scored for Brazil while Staniša Mandić scored for the European team. The match went to extra time, whereupon Nemanja Maksimović scored the second and winning goal for Serbia in the 118th minute.

Serbia's victory was received with surprise by some commentators, including Tom Edwards of the Irish Independent, and sparked celebrations in Serbia, with more than 50,000 people welcoming them on their return to Belgrade. President Tomislav Nikolić visited the team in their training camp in Belgrade to congratulate them.

=== Details ===
20 June 2015
17:05

Brazil	1–2 (a.e.t.)	Serbia
A. Pereira 73'		Mandić 70'; Maksimović 118'

North Harbour Stadium, Auckland
Attendance: 25,317
Referee: Fahad Al-Mirdasi (Saudi Arabia)

Assistant referees:
Abdullah al-Shalwai (Saudi Arabia)
Abu Bakar al-Amri (Oman)
Fourth official:
Matthew Conger (New Zealand)
