= Kevin Gutiérrez =

Mexican footballer (born 1995)

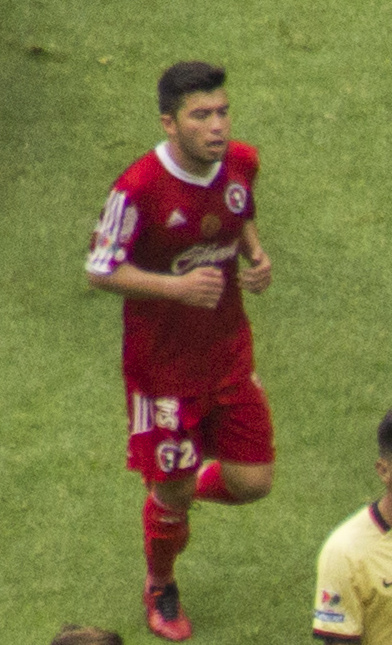
- Gutiérrez playing for Tijuana

Personal information
- Full name: Kevin Rusell Gutiérrez González
- Date of birth: 1 March 1995 (age 31)
- Place of birth: Tuxtla Gutiérrez, Mexico
- Height: 1.63 m (5 ft 4 in)
- Position: Defensive midfielder

Youth career
- 2009–2013: Chiapas
- 2013–2017: Querétaro

Senior career*
Years	Team	Apps	(Gls)
2012–2013	Chiapas	2	(0)
2013–2017	Querétaro	22	(3)
2014	→ Irapuato (loan)	11	(1)
2016	→ Tijuana (loan)	27	(2)
2017–2018	→ Dorados de Sinaloa (loan)	23	(1)
2018–2019	Juárez	19	(1)
2019	Correcaminos UAT	11	(0)
2020	San José	0	(0)
2022	Nayarit	13	(0)

International career
2015	Mexico U20	6	(1)
- * Club domestic league appearances and goals as of 20 September 2019

Kevin Rusell Gutiérrez González (Note: In this Spanish name, the first or paternal surname is Gutiérrez and the second or maternal family name is González.) (born 1 March 1995) is a Mexican professional footballer who plays as a defensive midfielder.

== Career ==
In the 2015 Clausura season, he played his first match of the season against Tigres in the start of second half even scoring 8 minutes later. Gutiérrez was later included in the starting eleven against Morelia where they won 2–1.

== Honours ==
Mexico U20

- CONCACAF U-20 Championship: 2015
