= Souleymane Coulibaly (footballer, born 1996) =

Malian footballer

Personal information
- Full name: Souleymane Coulibaly
- Date of birth: 8 August 1996 (age 30)
- Place of birth: Mali
- Height: 1.79 m (5 ft 10 in)
- Position: Defender

Team information
- Current team: Stade Malien

Senior career*
Years	Team	Apps	(Gls)
–2015	Real Bamako		
2015–2016	Club Africain	9	(0)
2017	Aiginiakos	0	(0)
2018–	Stade Malien		

International career^{‡}
2015	Mali U20	10	(1)
2015	Mali	1	(0)
- * Club domestic league appearances and goals as of 7 January 2018 ‡ National team caps and goals as of 19 June 2018

Souleymane Coulibaly (born 8 August 1996) is a Malian professional footballer, who plays for Stade Malien.
