= Aboubacar Doumbia (footballer, born April 1995) =

Malian footballer

Personal information
- Date of birth: 19 April 1995 (age 31)
- Height: 1.68 m (5 ft 6 in)
- Position: Midfielder

Team information
- Current team: AS Real Bamako

Senior career*
Years	Team	Apps	(Gls)
2013–	AS Real Bamako		

International career^{‡}
2015	Mali	2	(0)
- * Club domestic league appearances and goals ‡ National team caps and goals as of 5 November 2019

Aboubacar Doumbia (born 19 April 1995) is a Malian football midfielder for AS Real Bamako.
