= List of TWAS Prize recipients =

This is a list of recipients of the TWAS Prize, awarded annually by The World Academy of Sciences (TWAS) since 1985.

== Summary ==
| Category | Year started | Total recipients | First recipient |
|---|---|---|---|
| Agricultural Sciences | 2003 | 19 | Fu Ting-Dong |
| Biology | 1986 | 40 | Mysore A. Viswamitra |
| Chemistry | 1985 | 41 | Leopoldo De Meis; Salimuzzaman Siddiqui (Note: Shared prize) |
| Earth Sciences | 2003 | 18 | Kaigala Venkata Subbarao |
| Engineering Sciences | 2003 | 20 | Mayra de la Torre |
| Mathematics | 1985 | 35 | Liao Shantao |
| Medical Sciences | 1988 | 37 | Manuel Elkin Patarroyo |
| Physics | 1985 | 39 | E. C. G. Sudarshan |
| Social Sciences (Note: Social Sciences Prize is also known as TWAS-Celso Furtado Prize) | 2013 | 7 | Ayşe Buğra; Zheng Xiaoying |

Gender of recipients
| Gender | Number |
|---|---|
| Male | 225 |
| Female (Note: Maria José von Paumgartten Deane was the first women recipient of the Prize) | 31 |

| Country | Number of Agricultural Sciences TWAS laureates | Number of Biology TWAS laureates | Number of Chemistry TWAS laureates | Number of Earth Sciences TWAS laureates | Number of Engineering Sciences TWAS laureates | Number of Mathematics TWAS laureates | Number of Medical Sciences TWAS laureates | Number of Physics TWAS laureates | Number of Social Science TWAS laureates | Total Number of TWAS laureates |
|---|---|---|---|---|---|---|---|---|---|---|
| India | 2 | 8 | 15 | 4 | 7 | 8 | 3 | 17 | 0 | 64 |
| China | 6 | 6 | 11 | 6 | 1 | 6 | 3 | 9 | 3 | 51 |
| Brazil | 0 | 5 | 5 | 3 | 1 | 13 | 8 | 6 | 1 | 42 |
| Argentina | 0 | 8 | 2 | 0 | 0 | 3 | 6 | 3 | 0 | 22 |
| Taiwan | 2 | 3 | 3 | 1 | 6 | 1 | 2 | 0 | 0 | 18 |
| Mexico | 1 | 7 | 1 | 2 | 3 | 1 | 1 | 1 | 0 | 17 |
| Chile | 0 | 2 | 0 | 1 | 0 | 2 | 0 | 1 | 0 | 6 |
| Turkey | 1 | 0 | 0 | 0 | 0 | 0 | 2 | 0 | 1 | 4 |
| Pakistan | 1 | 0 | 1 | 0 | 0 | 0 | 2 | 0 | 0 | 4 |

== Agricultural Sciences ==
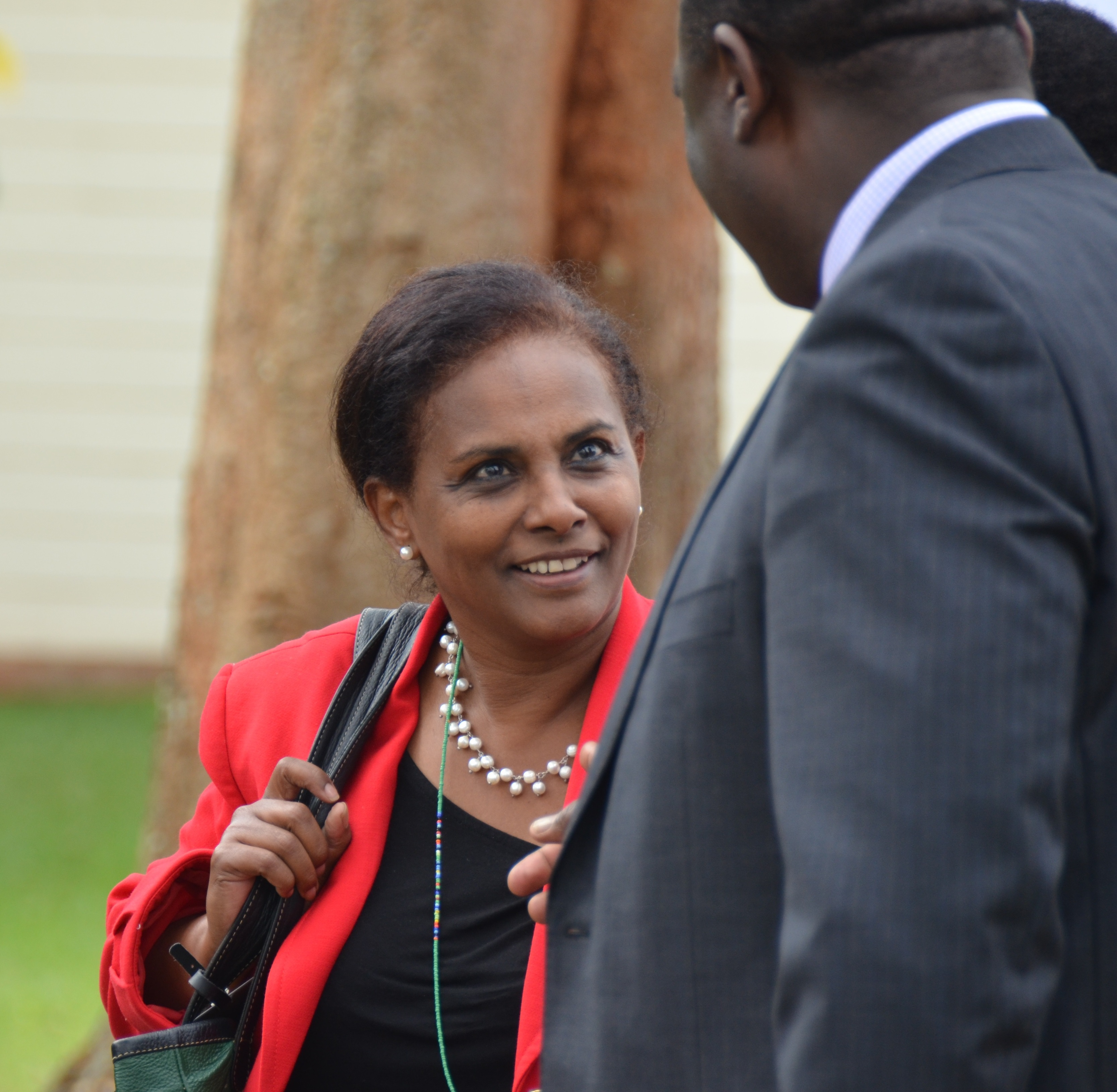
Segenet Kelemu

| Year | Recipient | Country |
|---|---|---|
| 2003 | Fu Ting-Dong | China |
| 2004 | Mohammad J. Malakouti | Iran |
| 2005 | Alex E. Bustillo Pardey | Colombia |
| 2006 | Heong Kong-Luen | Philippines |
| 2007 | Muhammad Arshad | Pakistan |
| 2008 | Jei-Fu Shaw | Taiwan |
| 2009 | Huey Lang Yang | Taiwan |
| 2010 | Francisco Alfonso Larqué Saavedra (Note: Shared prize in Agricultural Sciences) | Mexico |
| 2010 | Ibrokhim Abdurakhmonov | Uzbekistan |
| 2011 | Segenet Kelemu | Ethiopia |
| 2011 | Zeyaur Rahman Khan | India |
| 2012 | Jun Yu | China |
| 2012 | Egamberdieva Dilfuza | Uzbekistan |
| 2013 | Yong-Guan Zhu | China |
| 2014 | Fusuo Zhang | China |
| 2015 | Jagdish Ladha | India |
| 2015 | Feng-Min Li | China |
| 2016 | Ismail Cakmak | Turkey |
| 2018 | Dabing Zhang | China |

== Biology ==
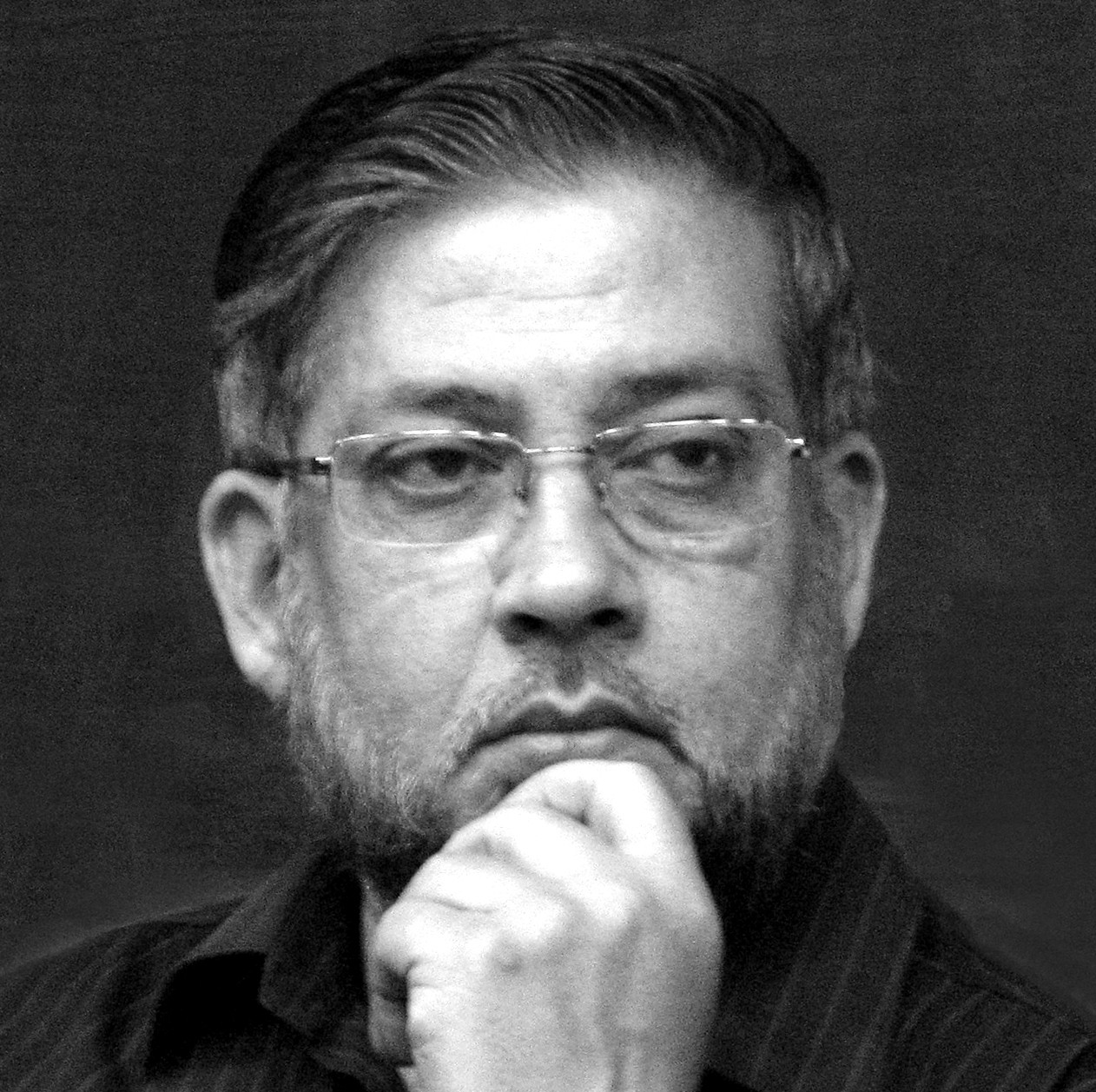
Raghavendra Gadagkar

| Year | Recipient | Country |
|---|---|---|
| 1986 | Mysore A. Viswamitra | India |
| 1987 | Adolfo Martinez-Palomo | Mexico |
| 1988 | Francisco José Barrantes | Argentina |
| 1990 | Eduardo H. Rapoport | Argentina |
| 1991 | Ramon R. Latorre | Chile |
| 1992 | Tsou Chen-Lu | China |
| 1993 | Luis Rafael Herrera-Estrella | Mexico |
| 1994 | Armando J. Parodi | Argentina |
| 1995 | Carlos S. Andreo (Note: Shared prize in Biology) | Argentina |
| 1995 | Carlos Eduardo G. da Rocha Miranda | Brazil |
| 1996 | Juan Carlos Castilla Zenobi | Chile |
| 1996 | Asis Datta | India |
| 1997 | Francisco Bolívar Zapata | Mexico |
| 1998 | Gabriel Guarneros | Mexico |
| 1999 | Raghavendra Gadagkar | India |
| 2000 | Alberto C. Frasch | Argentina |
| 2001 | Avadhesha Surolia | India |
| 2002 | Wang Zhizhen | China |
| 2003 | Rafael Palacios de la Lama | Mexico |
| 2004 | Jorge Kalil | Brazil |
| 2005 | Yang Huanming | China |
| 2005 | Jerson L. Silva | Brazil |
| 2006 | Pedro E. León Azofeifa | Costa Rica |
| 2007 | Lúcia Mendonça Previato | Brazil |
| 2008 | Carlos Arias Ortiz | Mexico |
| 2008 | Susana López Charretón | Mexico |
| 2009 | Lin He | China |
| 2009 | Partha Pratim Majumder | India |
| 2010 | Satyajit Mayor | India |
| 2010 | Soo-Chen Cheng | Taiwan |
| 2011 | Ana Belén Elgoyhen | Argentina |
| 2011 | Valakunja Nagaraja | India |
| 2012 | Ann-Shyn Chiang | Taiwan |
| 2013 | Xu Guoliang | China |
| 2013 | Sue Duan Lin-Chao | Taiwan |
| 2014 | Marcelo Rubinstein | Argentina |
| 2015 | Maria Isabel Colombo | Argentina |
| 2016 | Amitabha Chattopadhyay | India |
| 2016 | Zhou Qi | China |
| 2018 | Luisa Lina Villa | Brazil |

== Chemistry ==
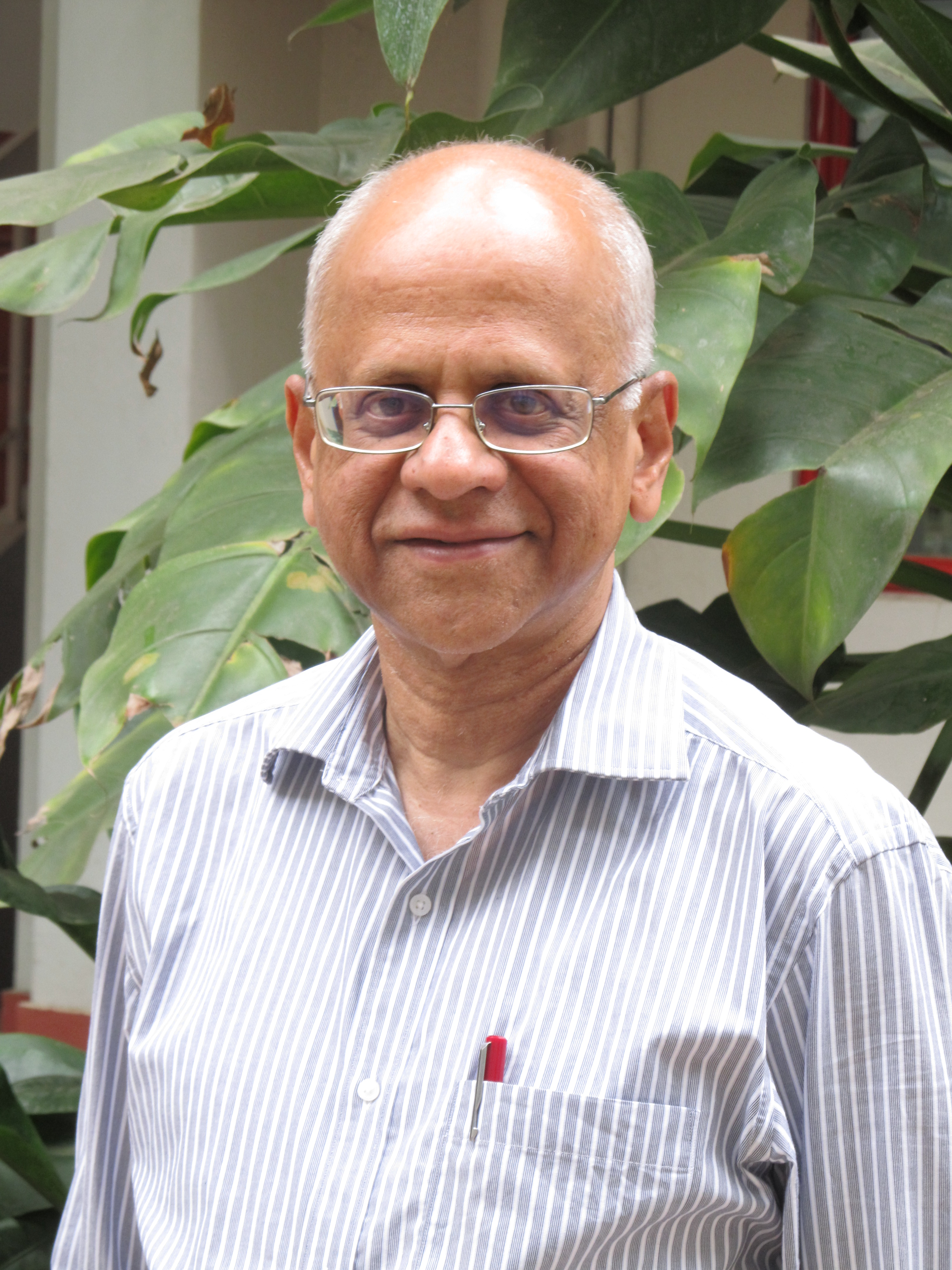
Gautam Radhakrishna Desiraju

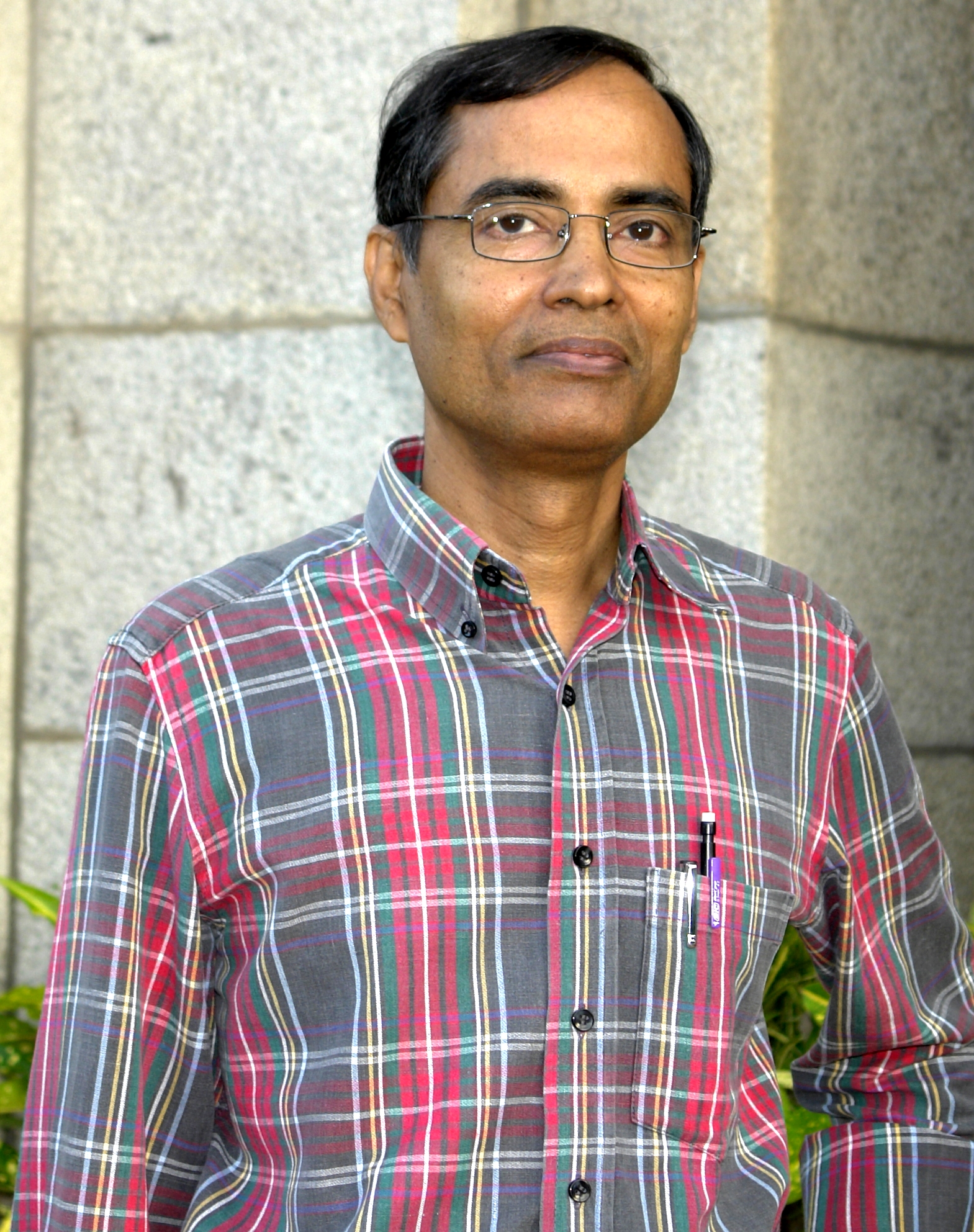
E. D. Jemmis

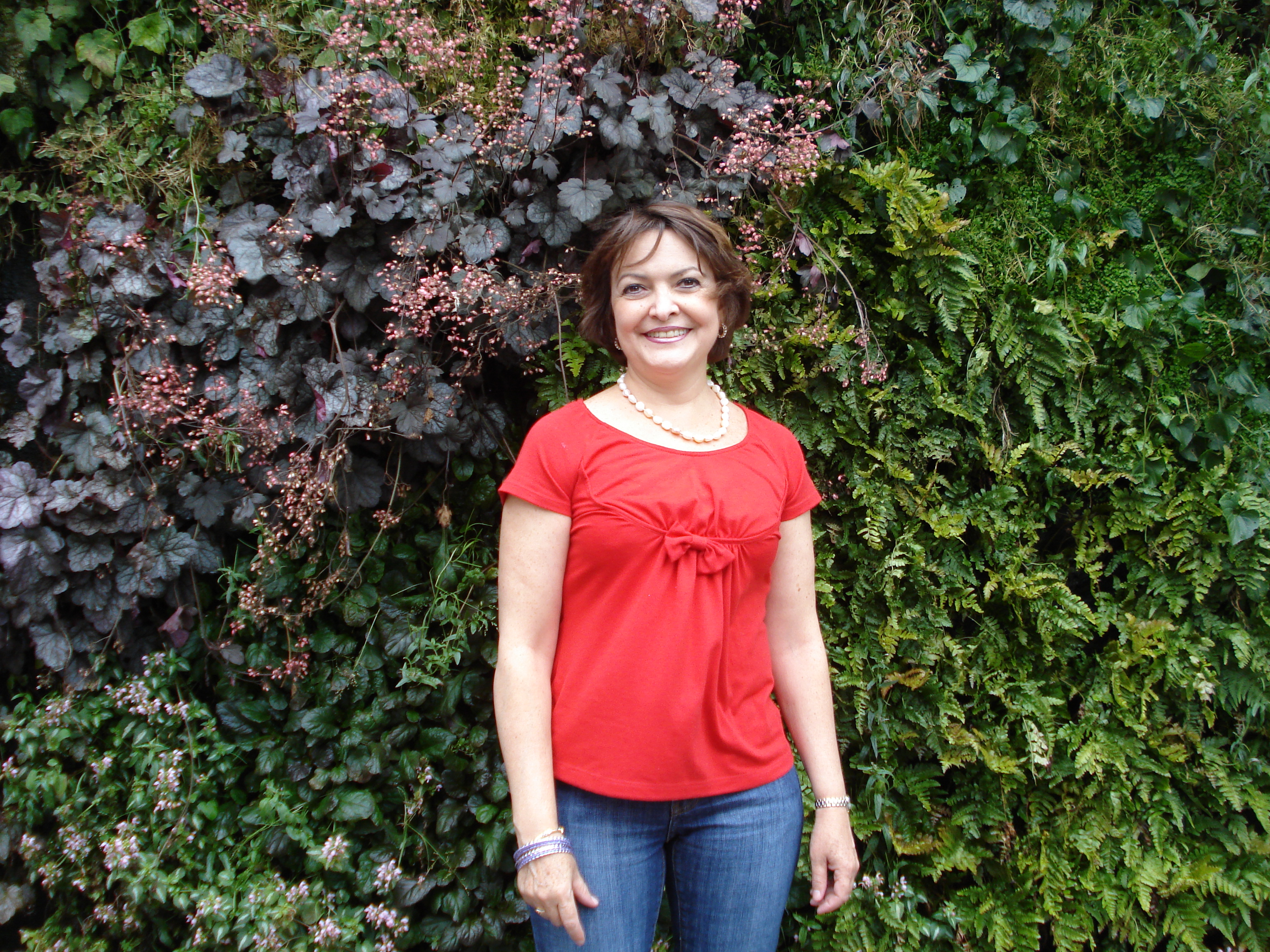
Tessy María López Goerne

| Year | Recipient | Country |
|---|---|---|
| 1985 | Leopoldo De Meis (Note: Shared prize in Chemistry) | Brazil |
| 1985 | Salimuzzaman Siddiqui | Pakistan |
| 1986 | Saad S.M. Hassan | Egypt |
| 1987 | Chen Chuangtian | China |
| 1988 | Sukh Dev | India |
| 1990 | Mohammed Hilmy Elnagdi | Egypt |
| 1991 | Otto Richard Gottlieb | Brazil |
| 1992 | Manapurathu Verghese George | India |
| 1993 | Animesh Chakravorty | India |
| 1993 | Giuseppe Cilento | Brazil |
| 1994 | Padmanabhan Balaram | India |
| 1994 | Huang Yao-Zeng | China |
| 1996 | Enrique J. Baran | Argentina |
| 1996 | Henrique Eisi Toma | Brazil |
| 1997 | Reuben Jih-Ru Hwu | China |
| 1998 | Biman Bagchi | India |
| 1999 | Darshan Ranganathan | India |
| 2000 | Gautam Radhakrishna Desiraju | India |
| 2001 | Kimoon Kim | Korea |
| 2002 | Peng Shie-Ming | Taiwan |
| 2003 | Eluvathingal Devassy Jemmis | India |
| 2004 | Miguel A. Blesa | Argentina |
| 2005 | Krishna N. Ganesh | India |
| 2006 | Che Chi-Ming | China |
| 2007 | Kankan Bhattacharyya | India |
| 2008 | Dongyuan Zhao | China |
| 2009 | Wan Lijun | China |
| 2009 | Swapan Kumar Ghosh | India |
| 2010 | Yang Dan | China |
| 2010 | Santanu Bhattacharya | India |
| 2011 | Jairton Dupont | Brazil |
| 2011 | Lei Jiang | China |
| 2012 | Xiao-Ming Chen | China |
| 2012 | Swapan K. Pati | India |
| 2013 | Ayyappanpillai Ajayaghosh | India |
| 2013 | Chung-Yuan Mou | Taiwan |
| 2014 | Xie Yi | China |
| 2015 | Pi-Tai Chou | Taiwan |
| 2015 | Tessy María López Goerne | Mexico |
| 2016 | Zhao Yuliang | China |
| 2018 | Thalappil Pradeep | India |

== Earth Sciences ==
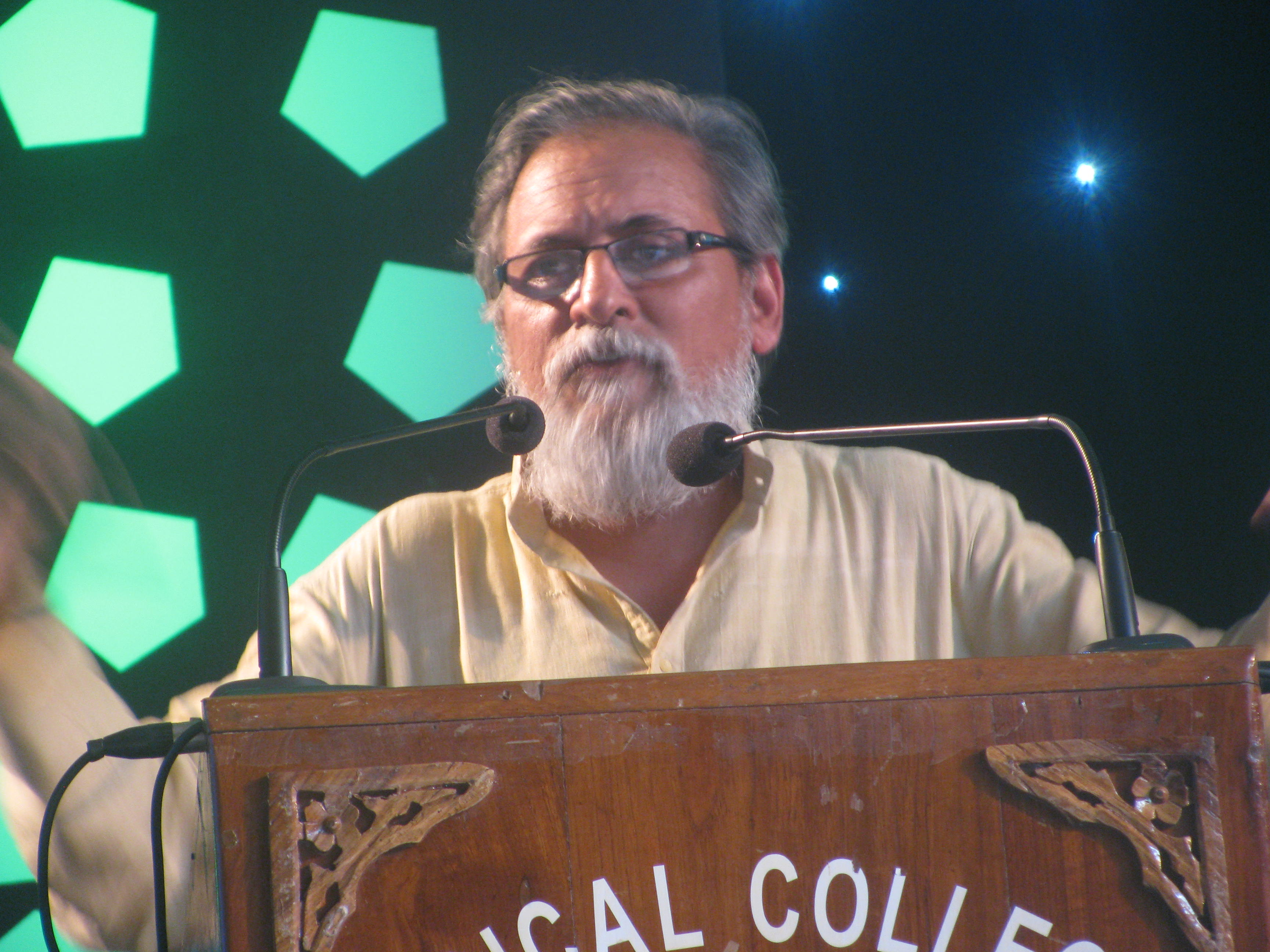
Anil Kumar Gupta

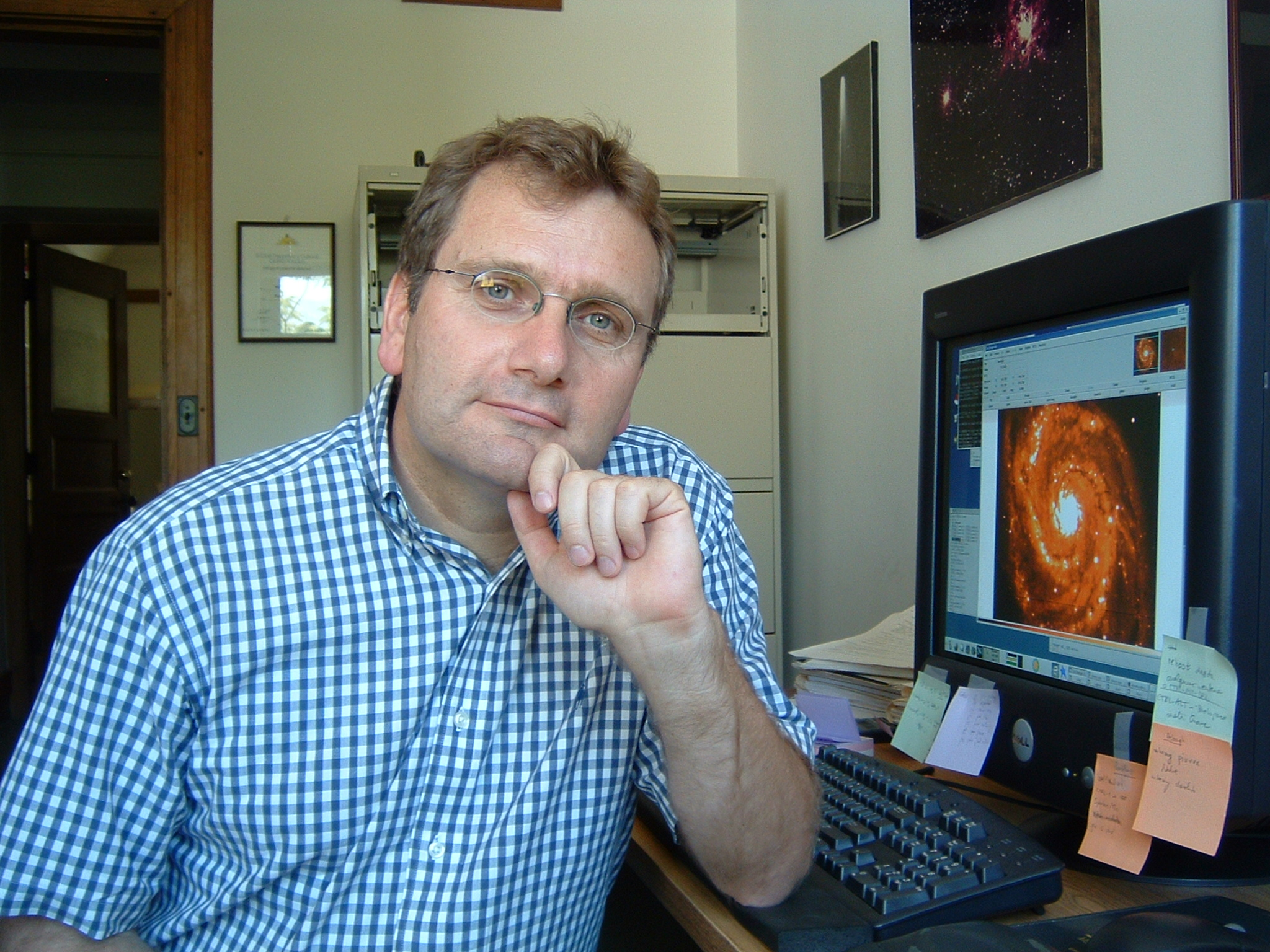
Mario Hamuy

| Year | Recipient | Country |
|---|---|---|
| 2003 | Kaigala Venkata Subbarao | India |
| 2004 | Adolpho J. Melfi | Brazil |
| 2005 | Zhu Rixiang | China |
| 2006 | Rengaswamy Ramesh | India |
| 2007 | Paulo Artaxo | Brazil |
| 2008 | Sun Jimin | China |
| 2009 | Rafael Navarro González | Mexico |
| 2010 | Anil Kumar Gupta (Note: Shared prize in Earth Sciences) | India |
| 2010 | Alexander Kellner | Brazil |
| 2011 | S. K. Satheesh | India |
| 2011 | Wu Fuyuan | China |
| 2012 | Patrick George Eriksson | South Africa |
| 2013 | Li Xia | China |
| 2014 | Sun-Lin Chung | Taiwan |
| 2015 | Piao Shilong | China |
| 2016 | Mario Hamuy | Chile |
| 2018 | Guochun Zhao | China |
| 2018 | Alejandro Raga | Mexico |

== Engineering Sciences ==
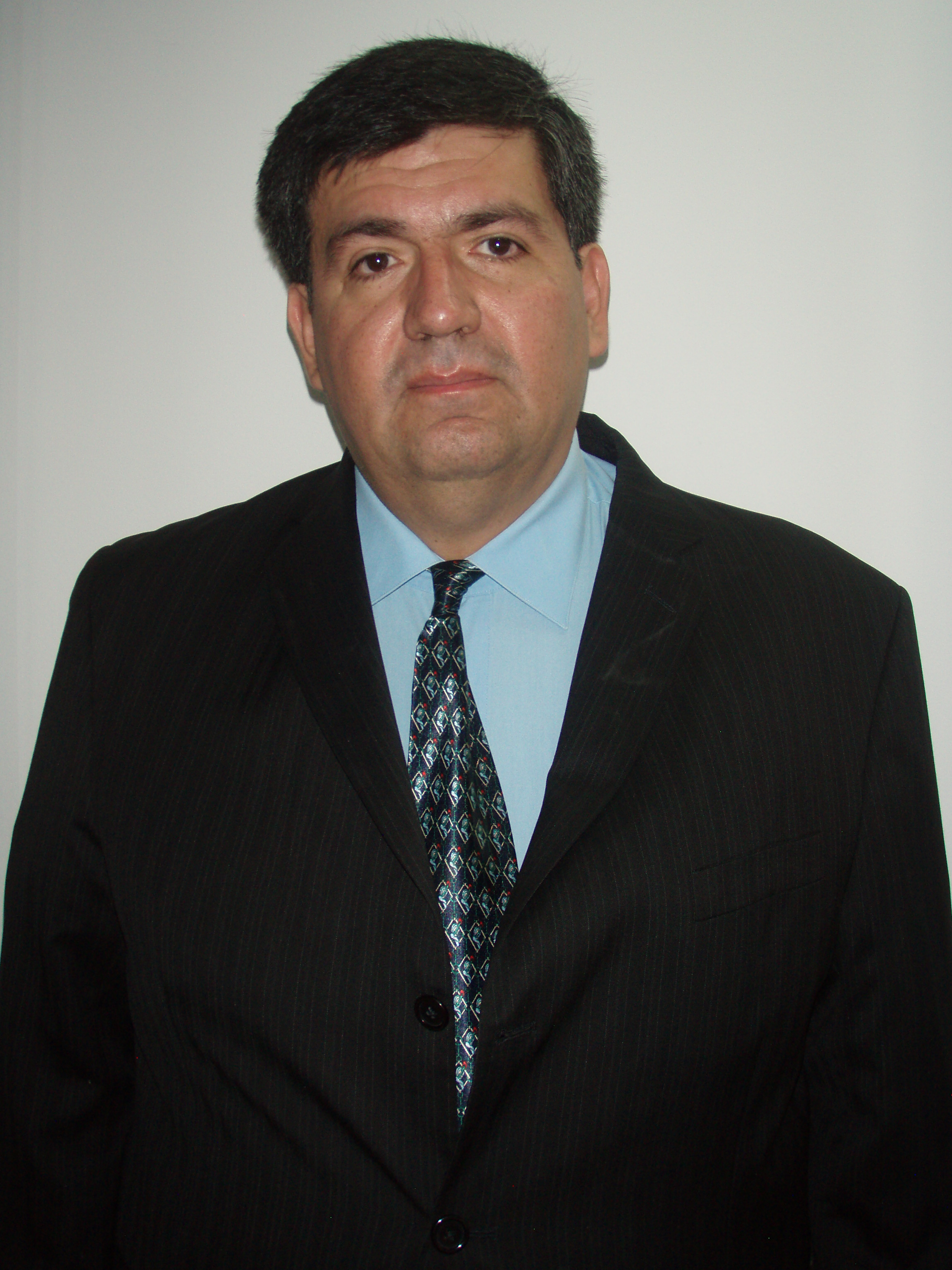
Carlos Artemio Coello Coello

| Year | Recipient | Country |
|---|---|---|
| 2003 | Mayra de la Torre | Mexico |
| 2004 | Li Aizhen | China |
| 2005 | Mauricio Terrones | Mexico |
| 2006 | Chang Chun-Yen | Taiwan |
| 2007 | Chih-Kung Lee | Taiwan |
| 2008 | Ashutosh Sharma | India |
| 2009 | Chen Liang-gee | Taiwan |
| 2010 | Vivek Borkar (Note: Shared prize in Engineering Sciences) | India |
| 2010 | Edgar D. Zanotto | Brazil |
| 2011 | Lin Yi-bing | Taiwan |
| 2012 | Abdul Latiff Ahmad | Malaysia |
| 2012 | Kalyanmoy Deb | India |
| 2013 | Indranil Manna | India |
| 2013 | Mohammad Ahmad Al-Nimr | Jordan |
| 2014 | Kumaran Viswanathan | India |
| 2014 | Chih-Yuan Lu | Taiwan |
| 2015 | Upadrasta Ramamurty | India |
| 2016 | Carlos Artemio Coello Coello | Mexico |
| 2018 | Yu-Chee Tseng | Taiwan |
| 2018 | Sanghamitra Bandyopadhyay | India |

== Mathematics ==
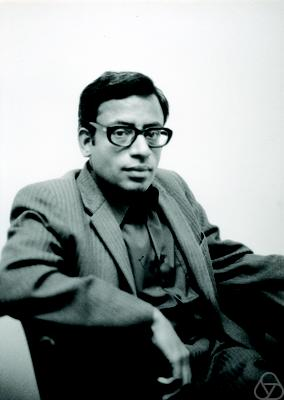
K. R. Parthasarathy

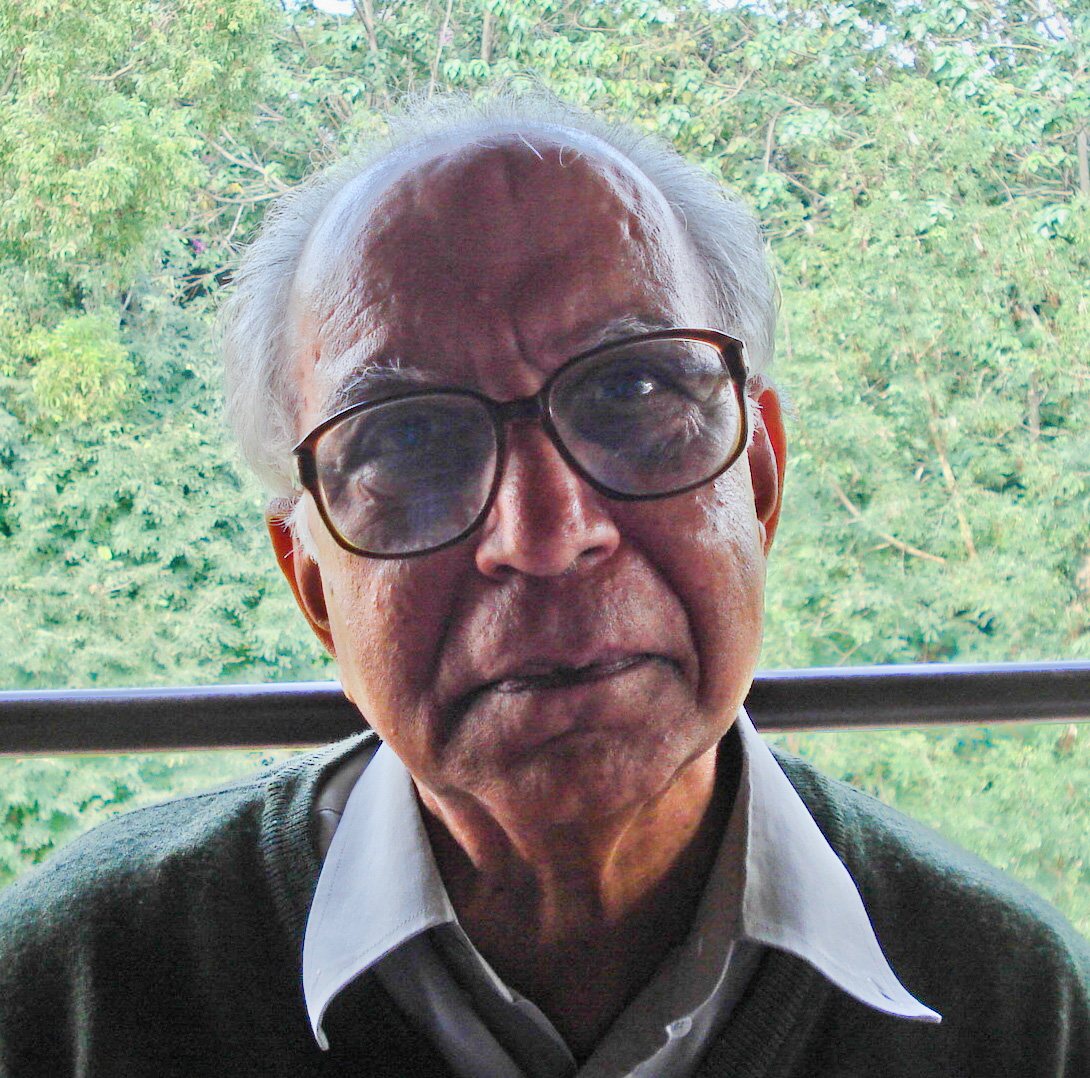
M. S. Narasimhan

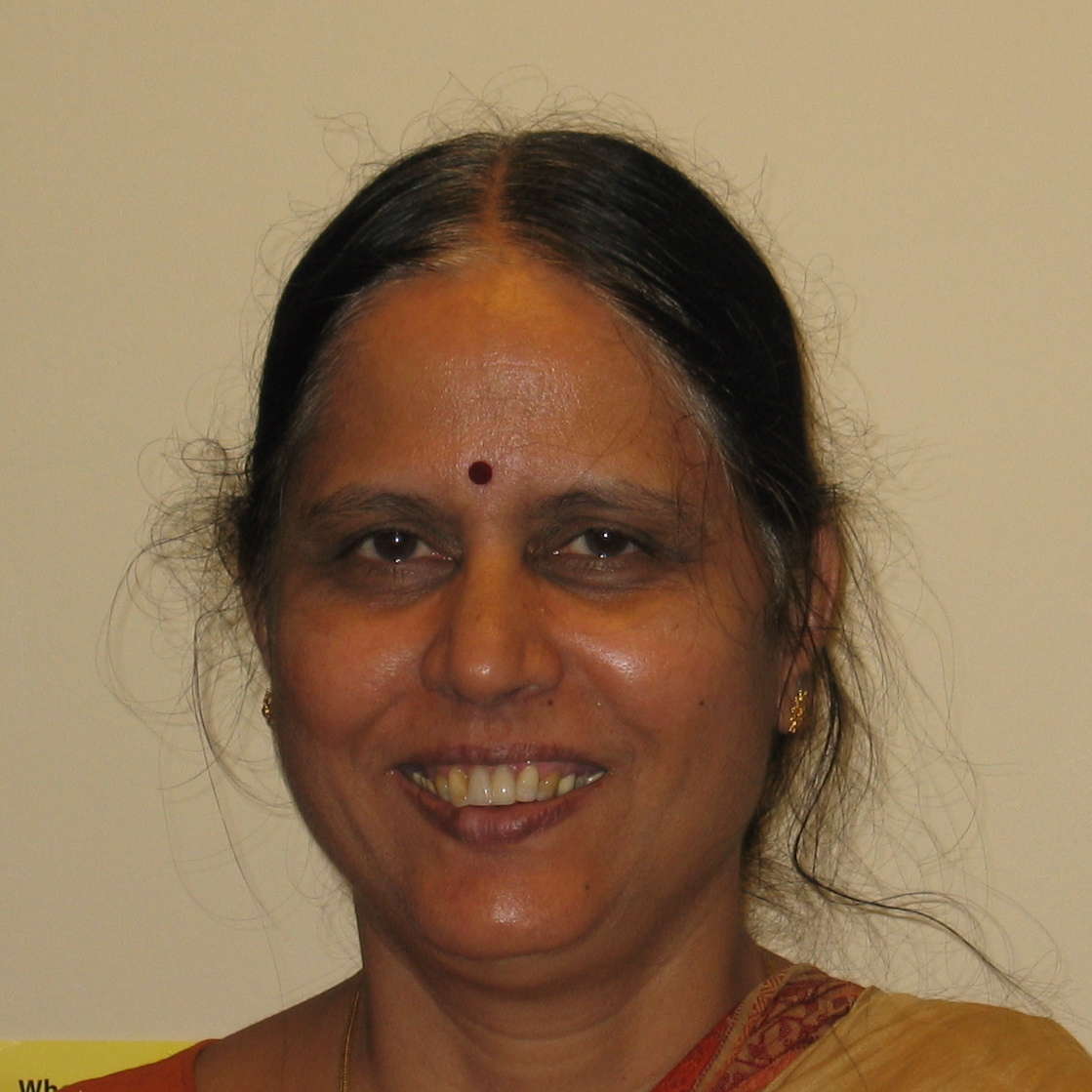
Raman Parimala

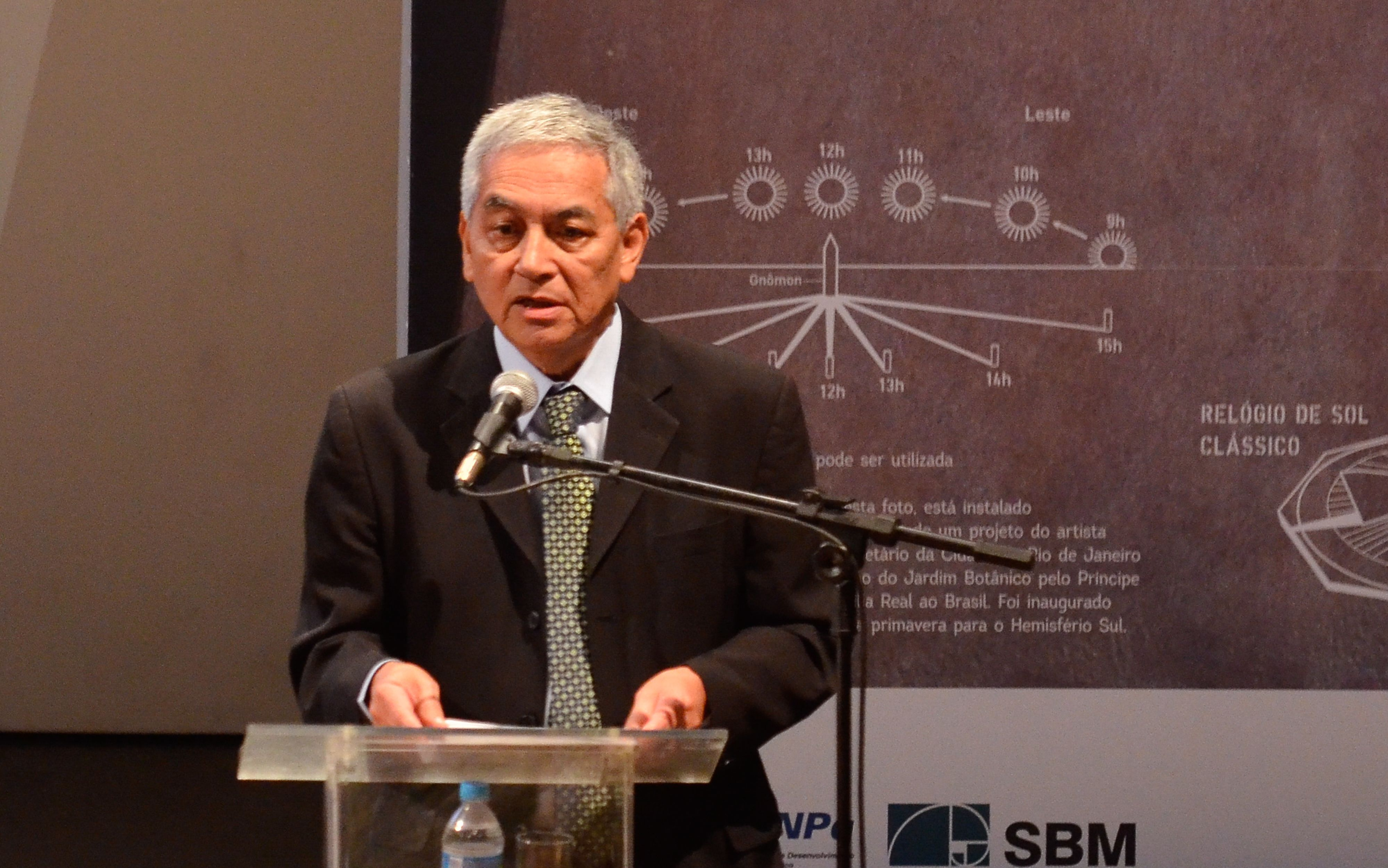
César Camacho

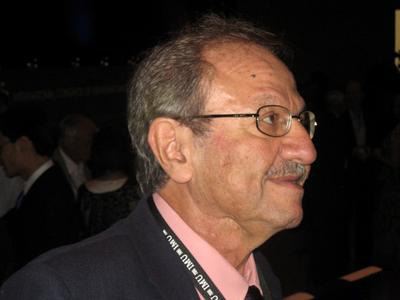
Jacob Palis

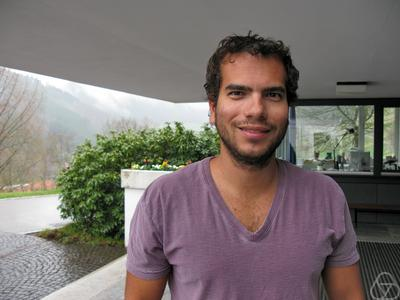
Artur Avila

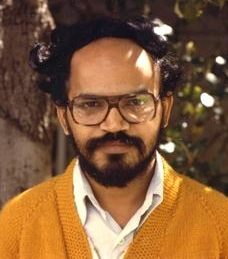
S. G. Dani

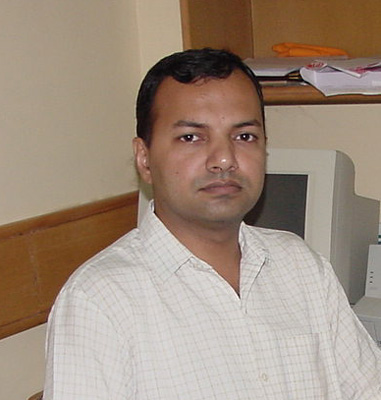
Manindra Agrawal

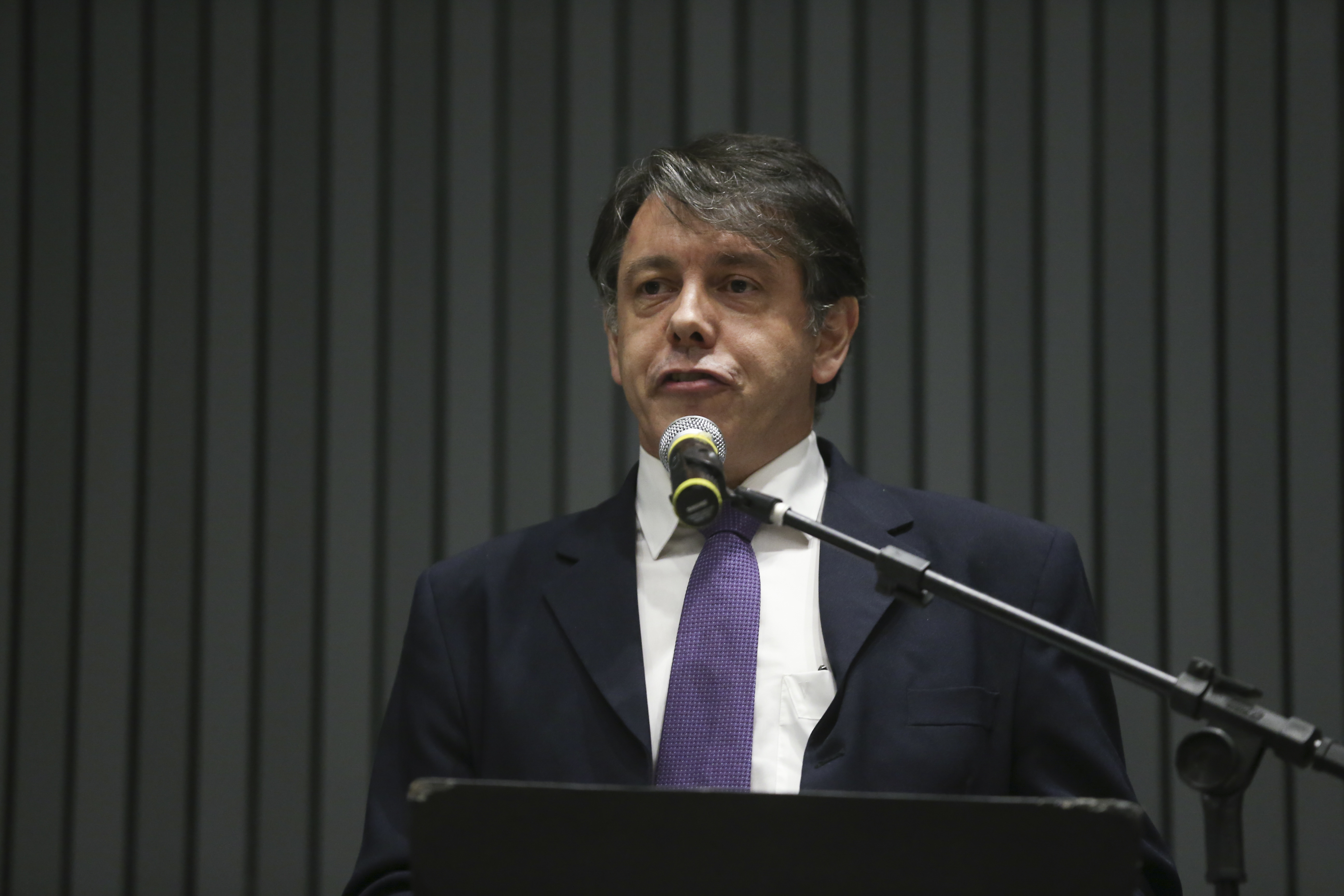
Marcelo Viana

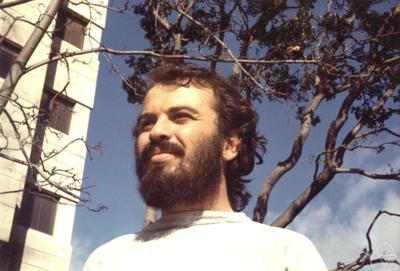
Welington de Melo

| Year | Recipient | Country |
|---|---|---|
| 1985 | Liao Shantao | China |
| 1986 | Mauricio M. Peixoto | Brazil |
| 1987 | Mudambai Seshachalu Narasimhan | India |
| 1988 | Jacob Palis | Brazil |
| 1990 | Wu Wen-Tsun | China |
| 1991 | Madabusi S. Raghunathan | India |
| 1992 | Manfredo do Carmo | Brazil |
| 1993 | Chang Kung-Ching | China |
| 1994 | Ricardo Mañé | Uruguay / Brazil |
| 1995 | Ibrahim A. Eltayeb (Note: Shared prize in Mathematics) | Sultanate of Oman |
| 1995 | Carlos Segovia | Argentina |
| 1996 | César Leopoldo Camacho | Brazil |
| 1996 | K. R. Parthasarathy | India |
| 1998 | Marcelo Viana | Brazil |
| 1999 | Servet Martinez | Chile |
| 2000 | Weiping Zhang | China |
| 2001 | Sundararaman Ramanan | India |
| 2002 | José Antonio de la Peña | Mexico |
| 2003 | Welington Celso de Melo | Brazil |
| 2004 | Long Yiming | China |
| 2005 | Parimala Raman | India |
| 2006 | Claudio Landim | Brazil |
| 2007 | Shrikrishna G. Dani | India |
| 2008 | Vasudevan Srinivas | India |
| 2009 | Enrique Pujals | Brazil |
| 2010 | Manindra Agrawal | India |
| 2010 | Carlos Gustavo Moreira | Brazil |
| 2011 | Shun-Jen Cheng | Taiwan |
| 2011 | Patricio Luis Felmer | Chile |
| 2012 | Fernando Codá Marques | Brazil |
| 2013 | Artur Avila | Brazil |
| 2014 | Ya-xiang Yuan | China |
| 2015 | Alicia Dickenstein | Argentina |
| 2016 | Lorenzo Justiniano Diaz Casado | Brazil |
| 2018 | Ricardo Guillermo Durán | Argentina |

== Medical Sciences ==
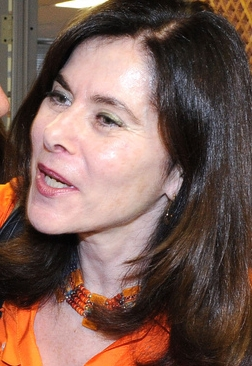
Mayana Zatz

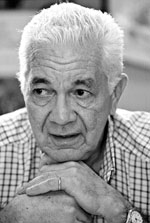
Ivan Izquierdo

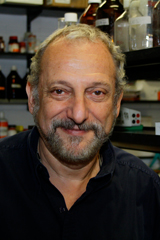
Eduardo Arzt

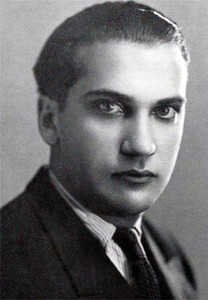
Jacinto Convit

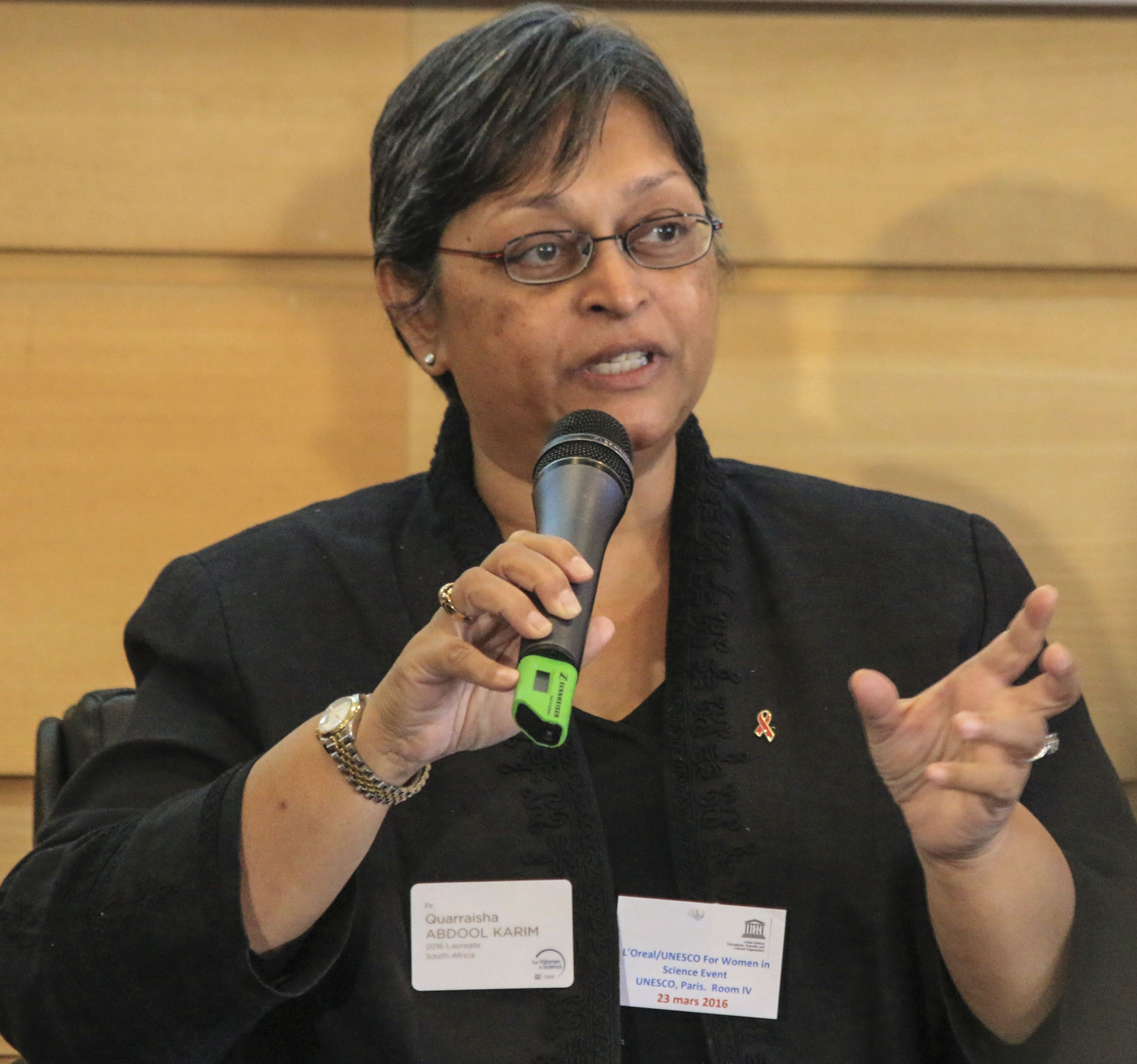
Quarraisha Abdool Karim

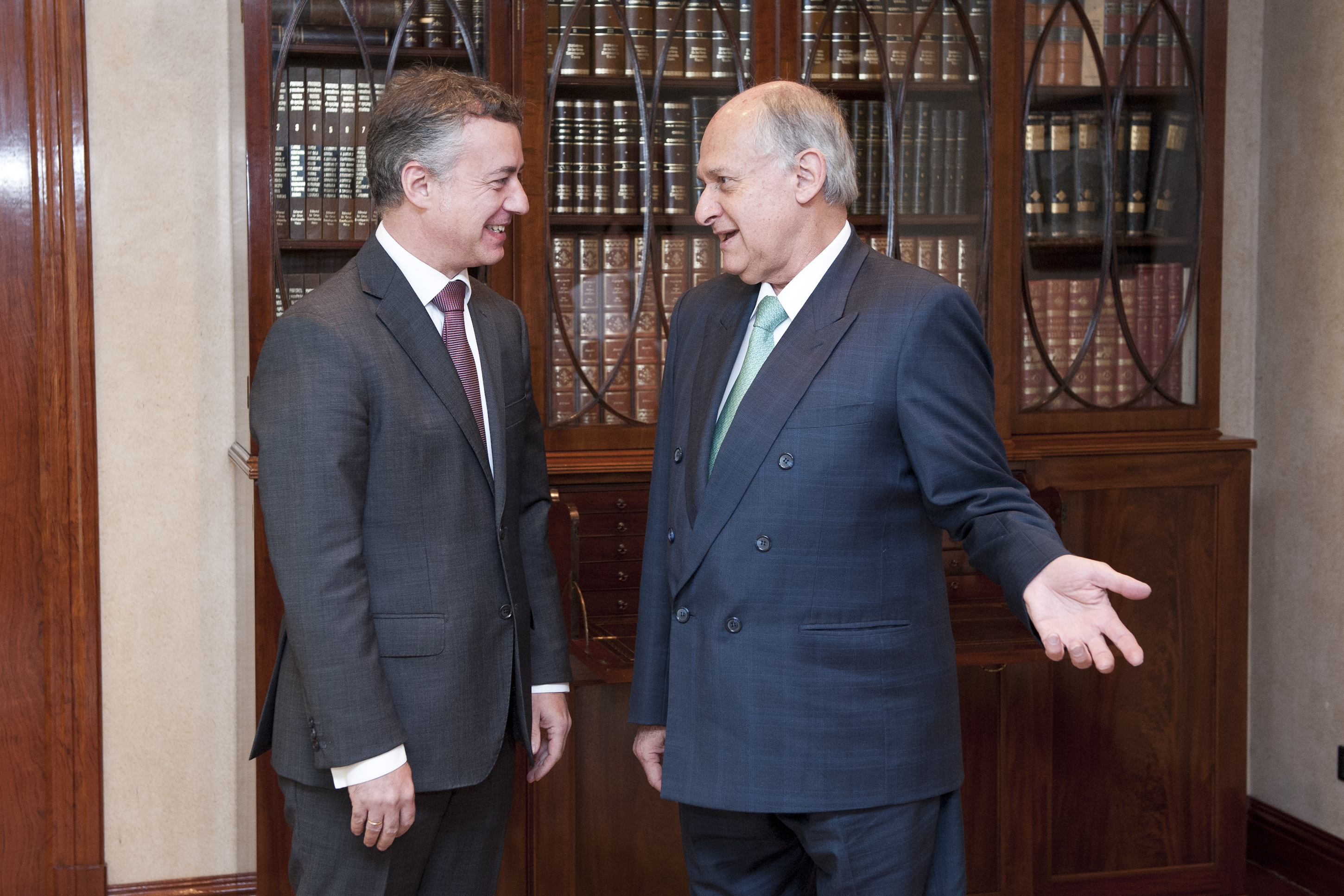
Manuel Elkin Patarroyo

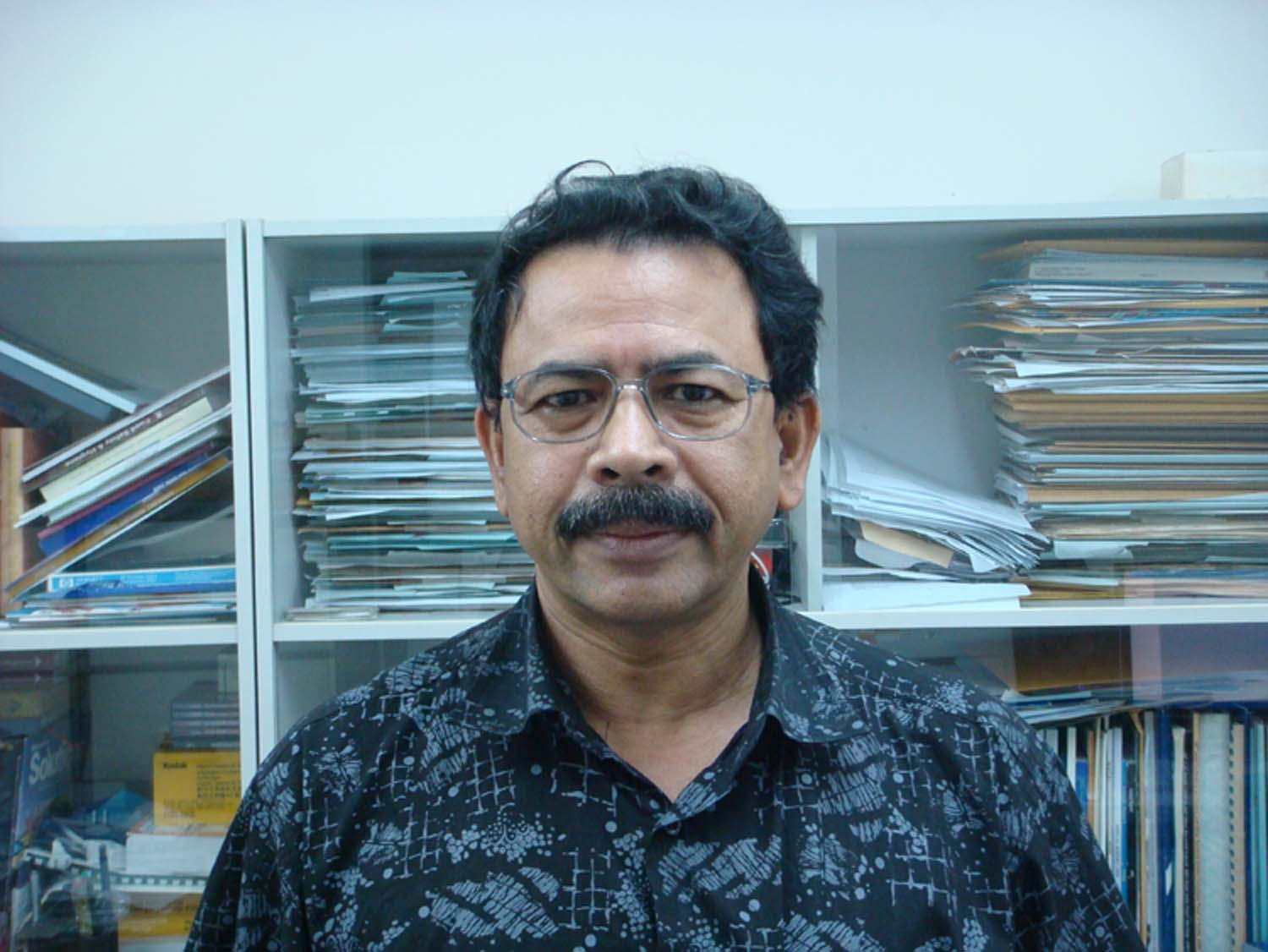
Shah M. Faruque

| Year | Recipient | Country |
|---|---|---|
| 1988 | Manuel Elkin Patarroyo | Colombia |
| 1990 | Sérgio Henrique Ferreira | Brazil |
| 1991 | Leonidas de Mello Deane (Note: Shared prize in Medical Sciences) | Brazil |
| 1991 | Maria José von Paumgartten Deane | Brazil |
| 1992 | Juan Carlos Fasciolo | Argentina |
| 1993 | Etim Moses Essien | Nigeria |
| 1994 | Suhayl J. Jabbur | Lebanon |
| 1995 | Dorairajan Balasubramanian | India |
| 1995 | Iván Antonio Izquierdo | Brazil |
| 1996 | Bhola Nath Dhawan | India |
| 1997 | Eduardo H. Charreau | Argentina |
| 1997 | Charles O.N. Wambebe | Nigeria |
| 1998 | Felix Konotey-Ahulu | Ghana |
| 1999 | Esper A. Cavalheiro | Brazil |
| 2000 | Rabia Hussain | Pakistan |
| 2001 | Rodolfo R. Brenner | Argentina |
| 2002 | Ranulfo Romo | Mexico |
| 2003 | Mayana Zatz | Brazil |
| 2004 | Shiv Kumar Sarin | India |
| 2005 | Shah M. Faruque | Bangladesh |
| 2006 | Jacinto Convit | Venezuela |
| 2007 | Sérgio Danilo Junho Pena | Brazil |
| 2008 | Salim Abdool Karim | South Africa |
| 2009 | Ricardo Gazzinelli | Brazil |
| 2010 | Gabriel Adrián Rabinovich | Argentina |
| 2011 | Alberto Kornblihtt | Argentina |
| 2012 | Quarraisha Abdool Karim | South Africa |
| 2012 | George F. Gao | China |
| 2013 | Mei-Hwei Chang | Taiwan |
| 2013 | Turgay Dalkara | Turkey |
| 2014 | Irene Oi Lin NG | China |
| 2014 | Tse Wen Chang | Taiwan |
| 2015 | Eduardo Arzt | Argentina |
| 2015 | Ge Ri-Li | China |
| 2016 | Zulfiqar Ahmed Bhutta | Pakistan |
| 2018 | Lynn Morris | South Africa |
| 2018 | Seza Õzen | Turkey |

== Physics ==
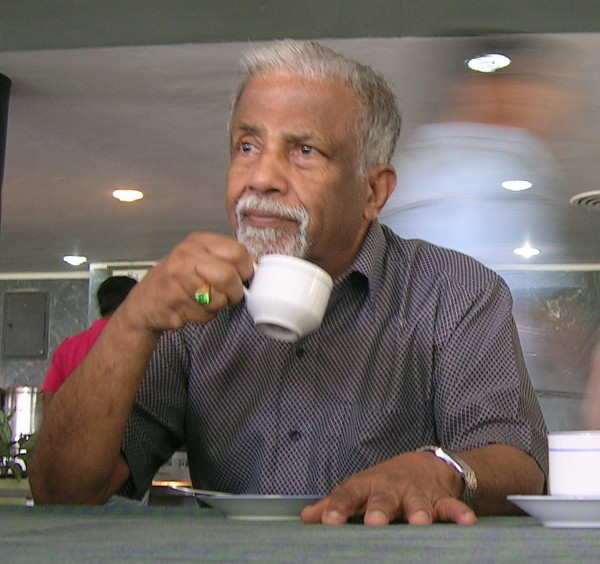
E. C. George Sudarshan

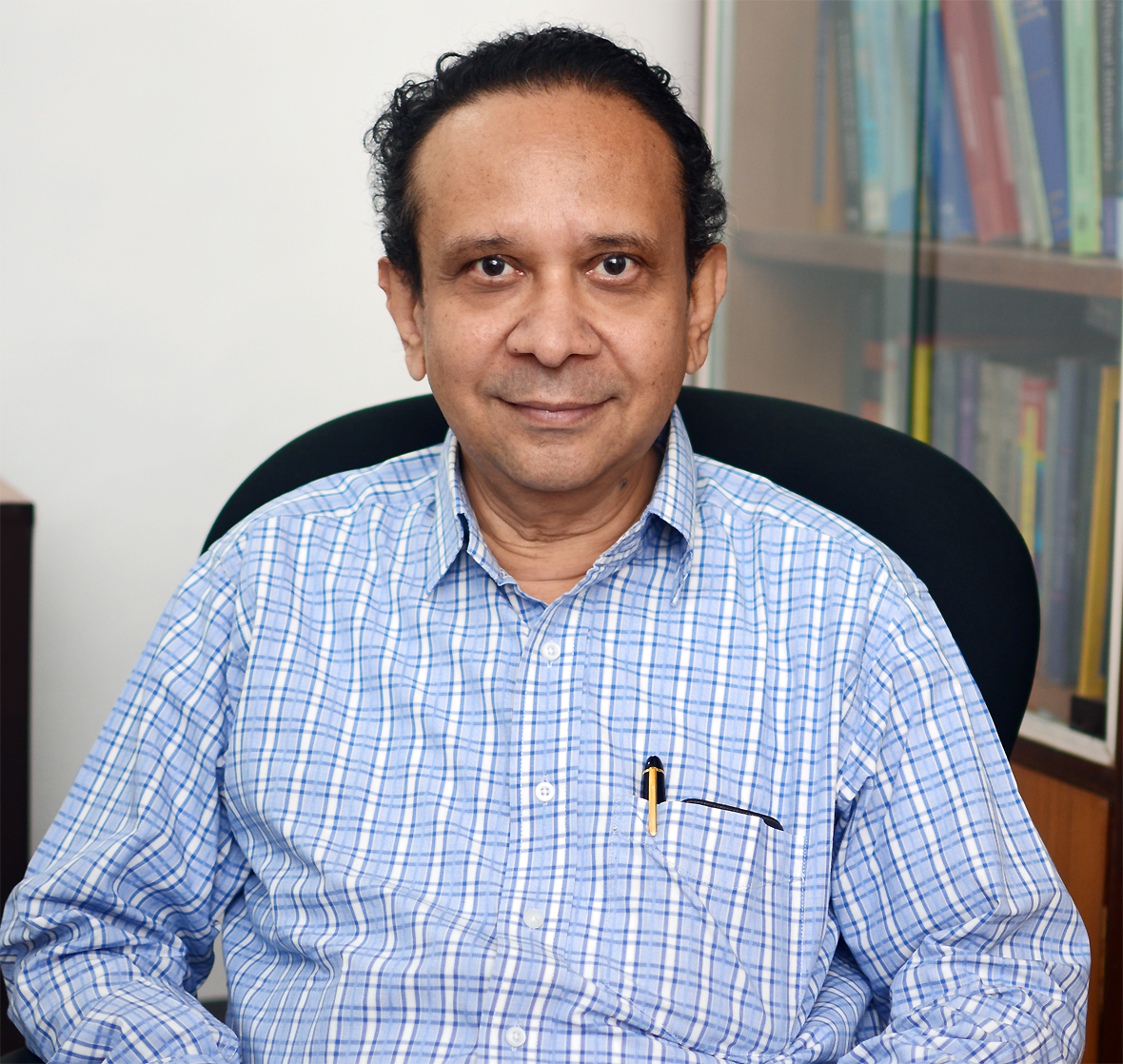
Thanu Padmanabhan

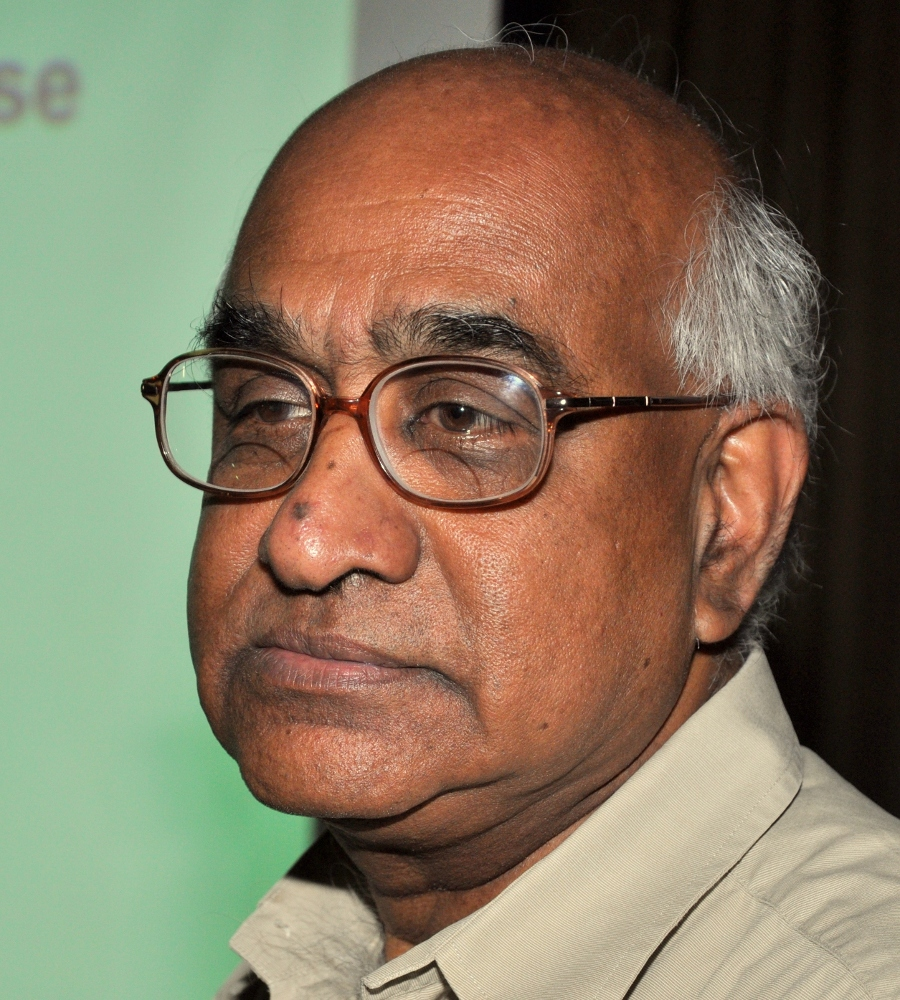
T. V. Ramakrishnan

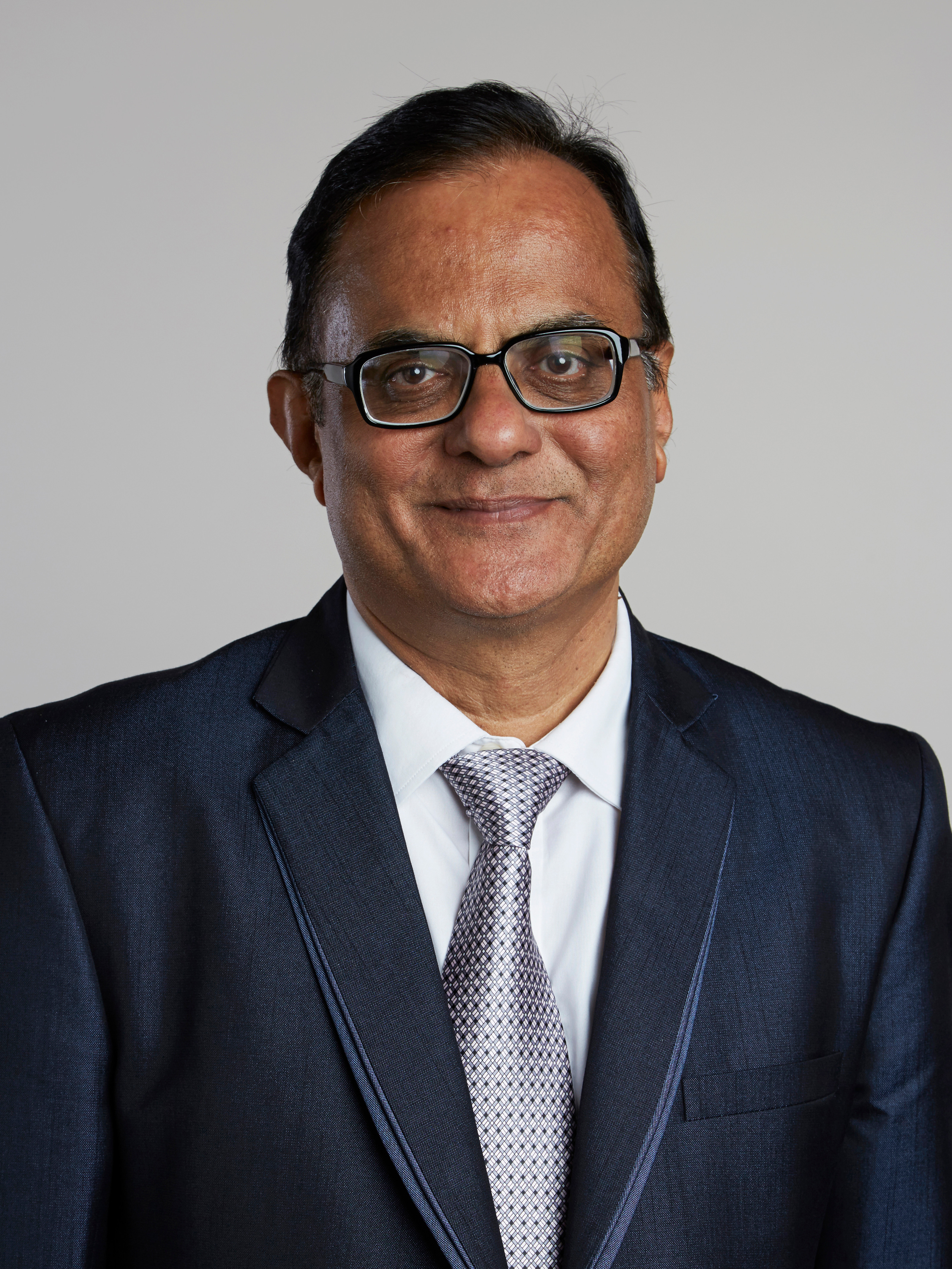
Ajay K. Sood

Rajesh Gopakumar

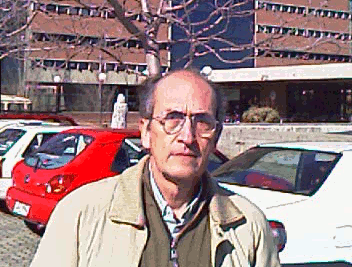
Rodolfo Gambini

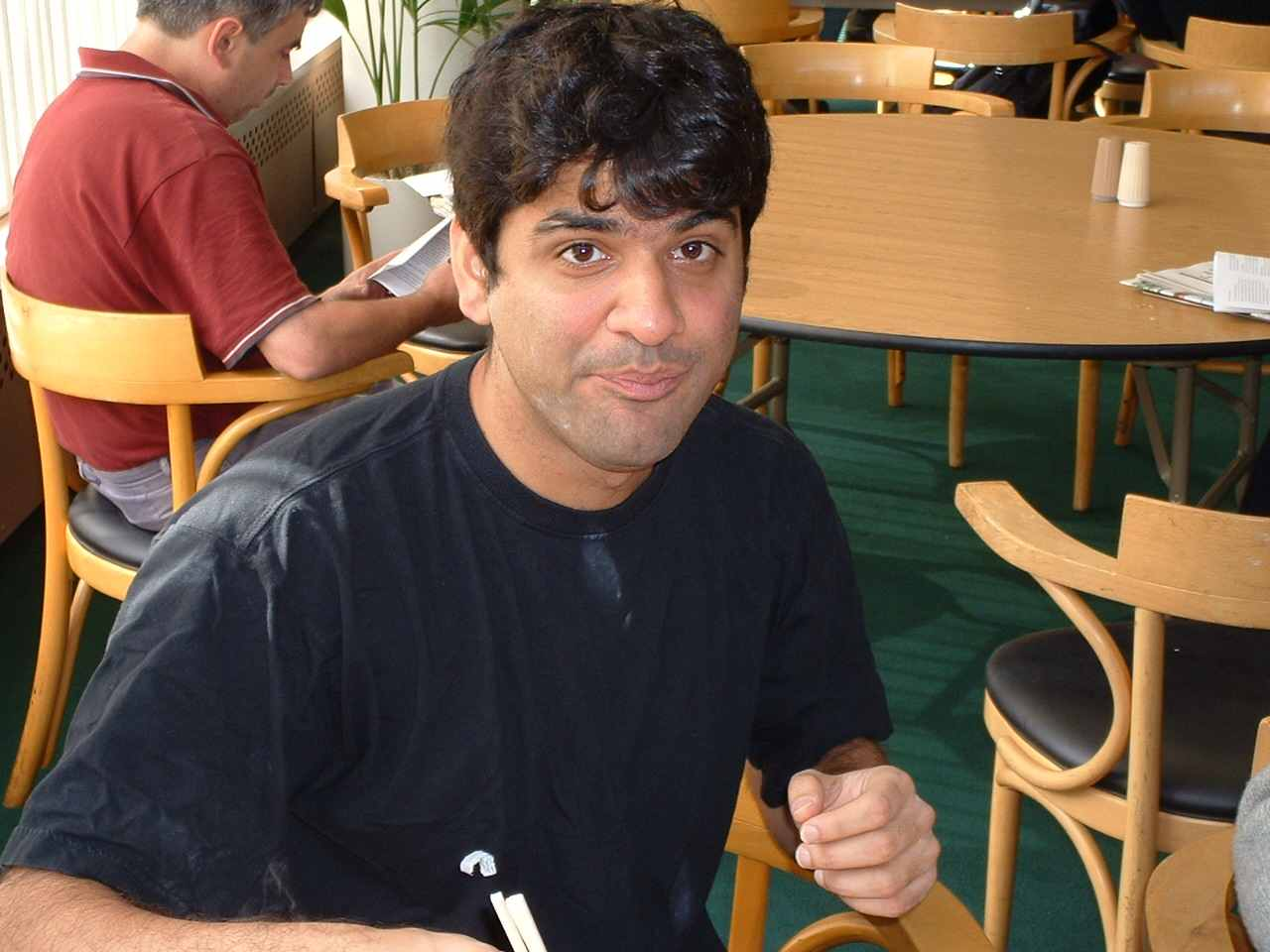
Shiraz Minwalla

| Year | Recipient | Country |
|---|---|---|
| 1985 | E. C. G. Sudarshan | India |
| 1986 | Zhao Zhongxian | China |
| 1987 | Cesar Mansueto Giulio Lattes | Brazil |
| 1988 | Govind Swarup | India |
| 1990 | Tirupattur V. Ramakrishnan | India |
| 1991 | Francisco de la Cruz | Argentina |
| 1992 | Narendra Kumar | India |
| 1993 | Guo Kexin (K.H. Kuo) | China |
| 1994 | Girish S. Agarwal | India |
| 1995 | Ramanath Cowsik (Note: Shared prize in Physics) | India |
| 1995 | Jayme Tiomno | Brazil |
| 1996 | Fan Hai-fu | China |
| 1996 | Enrique Tirapegui | Chile |
| 1997 | Luis F. Rodríguez | Mexico |
| 1997 | Ashoke Sen | India |
| 1998 | B. Sriram Shastry | India |
| 1999 | Min Naiben | China |
| 2000 | Ajay Kumar Sood | India |
| 2001 | Luiz Davidovich | Brazil |
| 2002 | Deepak Dhar | India |
| 2003 | Rodolfo Gambini | Uruguay |
| 2004 | Spenta R. Wadia | India |
| 2005 | Wang Enge | China |
| 2006 | Dipankar Das Sarma | India |
| 2007 | Zhang Jie | China |
| 2008 | Predhiman Krishan Kaw | India |
| 2008 | Ali Chamseddine | Lebanon |
| 2009 | Gao Hongjun | China |
| 2009 | Nathan Berkovits | Brazil |
| 2010 | Xue Qikun | China |
| 2011 | Thanu Padmanabhan | India |
| 2012 | Juan Pablo Paz | Argentina |
| 2013 | Rajesh Gopakumar | India |
| 2013 | Marcos Pimenta | Brazil |
| 2014 | Daniel de Florian | Argentina |
| 2015 | Sandip Trivedi | India |
| 2015 | Zhou Xingjiang | China |
| 2016 | Shiraz Minwalla | India |
| 2018 | Daniel Mario Ugarte | Brazil |

== Social Sciences ==
| Year | Recipient | Country |
|---|---|---|
| 2013 | Zhang Linxiu | China |
| 2014 | Rajah Rasiah | Malaysia |
| 2015 | Ayşe Buğra (Note: Shared prize in Social Sciences) | Turkey |
| 2015 | Zheng Xiaoying | China |
| 2016 | Marilda Sotomayor | Brazil |
| 2018 | Alex Chika Ezeh | Kenya |
| 2018 | Yansui Liu | China |

== See also ==
- Nikkei Asia Prize
- Borlaug CAST Communication Award
- L'Oréal-UNESCO Awards for Women in Science
