= M. Vijayan =

Indian structural biologist (1941–2022)

Mamannamana Vijayan
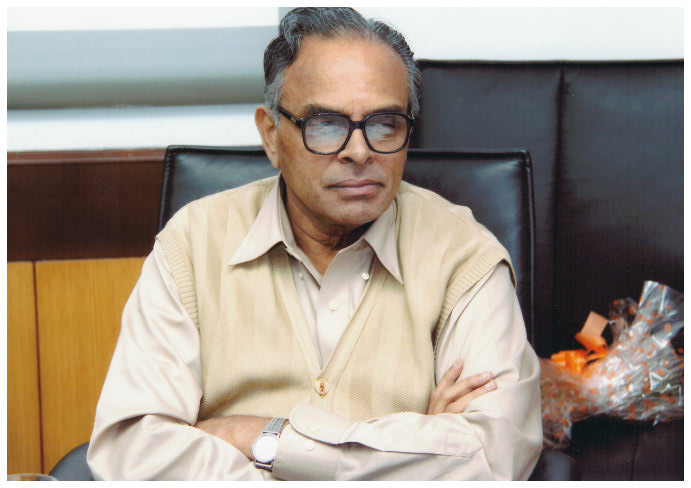
- Born: 16 October 1941; Cherpu, Kingdom of Cochin, British Raj
- Died: 24 April 2022 (aged 80); Bangalore, Karnataka, India
- Education: Indian Institute of Science
- Known for: Protein crystallography
- Awards: Padma Shri (2004), Shanti Swarup Bhatnagar Prize for Science and Technology(1985)
- Scientific career
- Fields: Biological sciences
- Workplaces: Indian Institute of Science
- Doctoral advisor: Mysore A. Viswamitra

Mamannamana Vijayan (16 October 1941 – 24 April 2022) was an Indian structural biologist.

He was awarded Padma Shri by the president of India in 2004. He was the president of the Indian National Science Academy from 2007 to 2010. He was DAE Homi Bhabha Professor at the Indian Institute of Science.

== Education ==
Vijayan graduated from Sree Kerala Varma College, Thrissur and obtained his Masters of Science degree in 1963 from Allahabad University. Thereafter, he received his Doctorate degree in X-ray crystallography from the Indian Institute of Science in 1967. During 1968–71, he was a post-doctoral fellow in Professor Dorothy Hodgkin's research group at University of Oxford. During that period, he studied x-ray diffraction data for insulin crystals.

== Contribution in structural biology ==
Vijayan and his colleagues have worked on four of the five classes of plant lectins. His studies, for the first time, have demonstrated the occurrence of "open" quaternary structures in multimeric proteins particularly in legume lectins and lectins with β-prism I fold. His work established β-prism I fold as a canonical fold of lectins. Structures elucidated by Vijayan showed that lectin adopt a variety of strategies for generating ligand specificity. In addition to the plants, Vijayan has extensively worked on lectins from mycobacteria and archea, thus demonstrating the occurrence of lectins in all the three domains of life.

Using structural biology approach he addressed the role of hydration in the mobility of proteins structures. His studies have shown that the structures of lysozyme and ribonuclease A undergo water-mediated transformations. His work on other systems, involving β-lactoglobulin and hemoglobin, as well, provided insights on role of hydration shell structure and function of proteins.

Vijayan has published more than 260 peer reviewed research articles and has guided 38 research students and 20 postdoctoral fellows.

== Professional life ==
After completing his postdoctoral research at the University of Oxford, he returned to India in 1971 and joined the Molecular Biophyiscs Unit at the Indian Institute of Science (IISc). He has served in various capacities such as Professor, Chairman of Molecular Biophysics Unit, Chairman of Division of Biological Sciences among others. During 2000–2004 he was Associate Director of IISc. He has continued to work at the Institute as a DBT Distinguished Biotechnologist and subsequently as a DAE Homi Bhabha Professor.

Vijayan's course on fundamentals in crystallography was extremely popular with students at the Indian Institute of Science. His unique approach of interlacing historical developments in the field with conceptual aspects made the course vibrant and energetic.

== Role in international and national organisations ==
Vijayan was a member of the International Union of Crystallography (IUCr), the International Union of Pure & Applied Biophysics (IUPAB), the International Council for Science (ICSU), the Inter Academy Panel (IAP) and the InterAcademy Council (IAC). He was a former president of the Asian Crystallographic Association. He has been involved in the activities of the science departments and agencies of the Government of India and different scientific institutions in the country. He was the Founder President of the Indian Crystallographic Association and has served as the president of the Indian Biophysical Society and the president of the Indian National Science Academy (2007–2010).

== Awards and recognitions ==
Vijayan was a Fellow of the three science academies of India and the Academy of Sciences for the Developing World (TWAS). He has won the Shanti Swarup Bhatnagar Prize, GN Ramachandran Medal by INSA, Alumni Award Excell. Res. by IISc, FICCI Award Life Sci., Ranbaxy Res. Award by Basic Medical Sciences, JL Nehru Centen. vis. fellow by INSA, Om Prakash Bhasin Award, KS Krishnan Memorial Lecture by INSA, JL Nehru Birth Centen. Award by Indian Science Congress Assoc., Padma Shri, Distinguished Biotechnologist Award by DBT; Goyal Prize, first CSIR/Science Congress GN Ramachandran Award for Excellence in Biological Science and Technology, Distinguished Alumni Award and Lakshmipat Singhania-IIM Lucknow National Leadership Award for Science and Technology-Leader, 2009.
