= Chung Sun-lin =

Taiwanese geologist

Chung Sun-lin (Chinese: 鍾孫霖) is a Taiwanese geologist.

== Education and career ==
Chung earned his bachelor's (1981), master's (1984), and doctoral (1990) degrees, all in geology, from National Taiwan University. Chung began his teaching career at his alma mater as a lecturer between 1991 and 1994, held an associate professorship at NTU from 1994 to 1998, was subsequently promoted to full professor, and was appointed to a distinguished and chair professorship in 2006, a position he retained until retirement in 2014. Chung was also affiliated with Academia Sinica's Institute of Earth Sciences as an associate research fellow, starting in January 2001. Sung was promoted to distinguished research fellow in May 2014, and became institute director in May 2017.

Chung was elected to fellowship within the Geological Society of America and the Mineralogical Society of America in 2005 and 2012, respectively. In 2014, he was awarded the TWAS Prize in Earth Sciences. In 2018, Chung was elected to The World Academy of Sciences as a fellow. Chung was elected a member of Academia Sinica in 2016, and a fellow of the American Geophysical Union in 2023. In 2016, Chung became a laureate of the Asian Scientist 100 by the Asian Scientist.
