= Li Aizhen =

Chinese physicist

- 李爱珍
- Born: May 1936 (age 90); Shishi, Fujian, China
- Education: Fudan University
- Scientific career
- Fields: Semiconductor
- Workplaces: Shanghai Institute of Microsystem and Information Technology

Chinese name
- Traditional Chinese: 李愛珍
- Simplified Chinese: 李爱珍
Transcriptions
Standard Mandarin
- Hanyu Pinyin: Lǐ Àizhēn

Li Aizhen (Chinese: 李爱珍; born May 1936) is a Chinese scientist at the Chinese Academy of Sciences Shanghai Institute of Microsystem and Information Technology (Chinese: 中国科学院上海微系统与信息技术研究所). An expert in semiconductor material, she was elected a foreign associate of the United States National Academy of Sciences in 2007.

== Biography ==
Born in Guangbian Village, Yongning Town, Shishi, Fujian Province, Li graduated from Quanzhou First High School in 1954, and entered Fudan University to study chemistry. She started her research career at Shanghai Institute of Metallurgy of CAS—now Shanghai Institute of Microsystem and Information Technology—in 1958. From August 1980 to October 1982, Li was a visiting scholar at department of electronic engineering of Carnegie-Mellon University in the United States. During her stay in the States, she visited Bell Labs and met with Alfred Y. Cho, the "father of molecular beam epitaxy".

On May 1, 2007, Li was elected a foreign associate of the United States National Academy of Sciences (NAS), thus became the first female Chinese scientist to receive this honor. As of 2018 Li has not been admitted into the Chinese Academy of Sciences (CAS), and is the only non-academician from China who has been elected into the NAS as a foreign associate. She is also a recipient of the 2004 Academy of Sciences for the Developing World (TWAS) Prize in Engineering Sciences.

== Contributions ==
Li has made substantial contributions to the development of electronic devices and laser technology.

== Honours and awards ==
- 2003 Member of the Asia Pacific Academy of Materials (APAM)
- 2004 Academy of Sciences for the Developing World (TWAS) Prize in Engineering Sciences
- May 2007 Foreign associate of the National Academy of Sciences (NAS)
