= Xu Guoliang =

Chinese molecular geneticist

- 徐国良
- Born: February 1965 (age 61); Zhuji, Zhejiang, China
- Education: Hangzhou University; Technische Universität Berlin
- Awards: TWAS Prize (2013); Tan Kah Kee Award (2014)
- Scientific career
- Fields: Molecular Biology
- Workplaces: Shanghai Institute of Biochemistry and Cell Biology
- Website: SIBCB

Xu Guoliang (Chinese: 徐国良; born February 1965) is a Chinese molecular geneticist. He is a professor at the Shanghai Institute of Biochemistry and Cell Biology and an academician of the Chinese Academy of Sciences.

== Biography ==
Xu graduated from Hangzhou University Department of Biology in 1985, and obtained his master's degree at Institute of Genetics and Developmental Biology, Chinese Academy of Sciences in 1989. In 1993 he earned his Ph.D. from Max Planck Institute for Molecular Genetics and Technische Universität Berlin.

Xu's research mainly focuses on the epigenetic regulation. In 2011 his group discovered that the DNA oxidative demethylation is mediated by DNA oxidase TET and glycosidase TDG, and clarified its role in the canceration of the cells. In 2014, he published his study concerning the effect of DNA methylation and histone modification.

In 2013, Xu was awarded the TWAS Prize "for his contribution to the understanding of the role and mechanism of DNA oxidation in epigenetic regulation of mammalian development". He won the Tan Kah Kee award in 2014. In 2015, he was elected a member of the Chinese Academy of Sciences.
