= Edgar D. Zanotto =

Brazilian materials engineer and professor

- Engineering career
- Discipline: Material engineering

Edgar Dutra Zanotto is a materials engineer and professor at the Federal University of Sao Carlos (UFSCar) in Brazil. He currently teaches glass related subjects for both undergraduate and post-graduate students and he is the head of the Vitreous Materials Laboratory (LaMaV). He is a recipient of the 2010 TWAS Prize.

In May 1998, Zanotto wrote an article in the American Journal of Physics relating to the false notion that observations of thick glass on old windows translated to the fact that glass is a liquid. Zanotto sought to calculate the flow of glass and found that at 414 Celsius (777 °F) the glass would move a visible amount in 800 years, yet at room temperature he found that it would take glass longer than the age of human history.
