= Raghavendra Gadagkar =

Indian ecologist (born 1953)

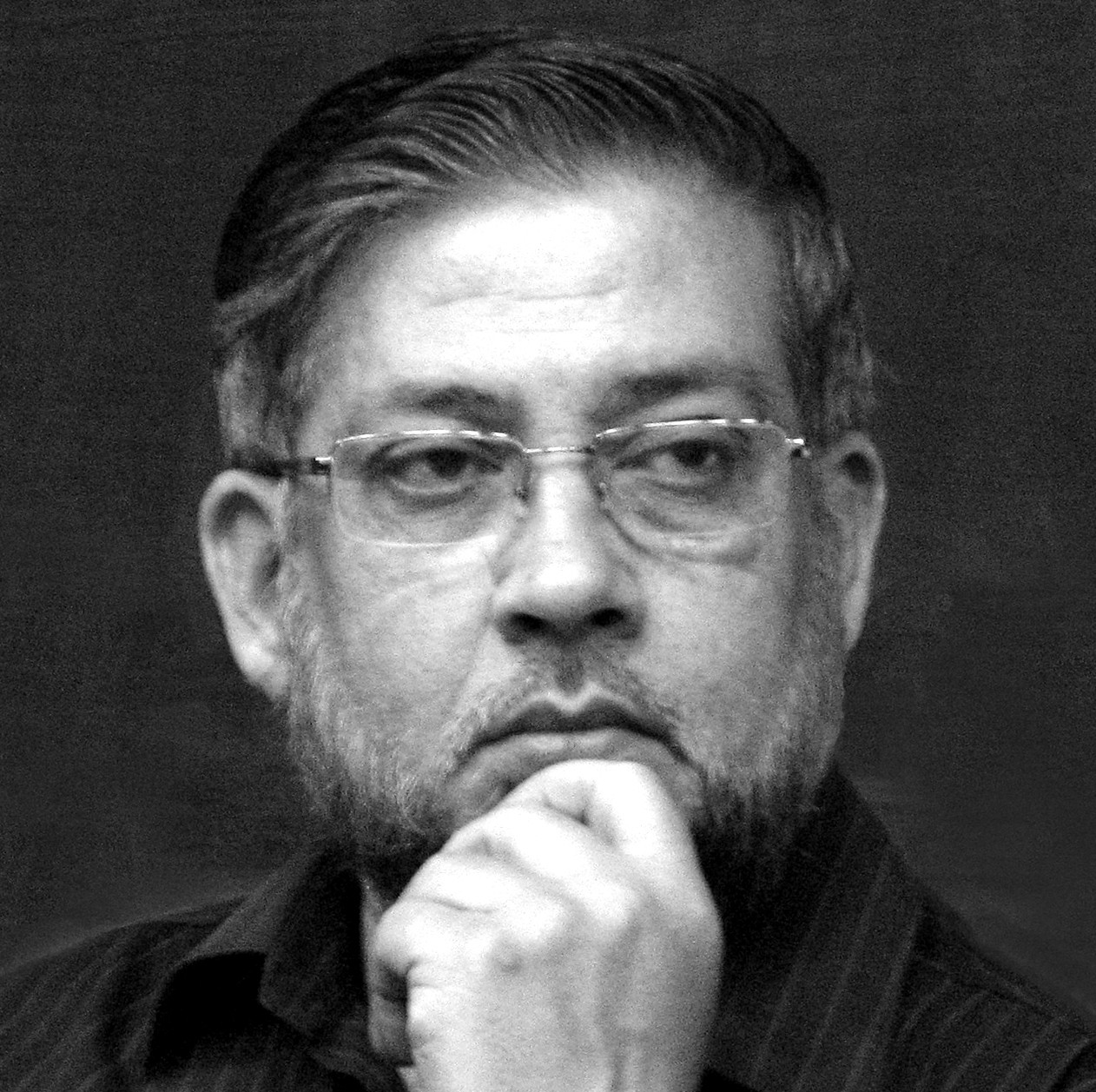
- Raghavendra Gadagkar
- Born: 28 June 1953 (age 73); Kanpur, India
- Known for: sociobiology, eusociality
- Awards: Shanti Swarup Bhatnagar Award in Biological Sciences (1993); Cross of the Order of Merit (Germany)(2015)
- Scientific career
- Fields: Biologist
- Workplaces: Indian Institute of Science
- Website: https://ces.iisc.ac.in/?q=user/33

Raghavendra Gadagkar is an honorary professor at the Centre for Ecological Sciences, Indian Institute of Science in Bangalore, India, who studies evolution of social behaviour using eusocial insects using Ropalidia marginata, a locally common wasp as a model. He was, from 2014 to 2016, the president of the Indian National Science Academy.

Gadagkar has published over 275 scientific papers and articles in various international journals as well as in Indian journals like Current Science magazine, and the Journal of Biosciences (India). His work on the evolution of eusociality using the theory of "assured fitness returns" which has been examined using empirical data is considered as a significant landmark and advance over the idea of inclusive fitness introduced by W. D. Hamilton in 1964. He helped established a research group that has examined theoretical predictions, proximate and ultimate factors in the evolution of sociality in wasps. Some of his opinion pieces on science policy have been questioned, such as his exception to the pay to publish, free to read Open Access science publishing model.

His first book, Survival Strategies, has been translated into Chinese and Korean. It uses simple language to explain recent advances in behavioural ecology and sociobiology to a general audience. In an interview published in Indian Entomologist, his book Survival Strategies has been considered an Indian masterpiece on ethology and has been compared with Konrad Lorenz's King Solomon's Ring.

He has also written a more technical book, The Social Biology of Ropalidia marginata: Towards understanding the evolution of eusociality, which puts together over twenty years of his research about the evolution of eusociality.

From 2002-2022 he was a Non-resident Permanent Fellow at the German institute Wissenschaftskolleg zu Berlin.

In 2006 Gadagkar became one of the very few Indian scientists to be elected as a Foreign Associate of the National Academy of Sciences, USA. He has won numerous awards for his contributions to science research including Cross of the Order of Merit (Germany) in 2015, the Shanti Swarup Bhatnagar Award in Biology in 1993 and the TWAS Prize in 1999.

He holds a number of other academic positions. He is the founding chairman of the Centre for Contemporary Studies, IISc, Bangalore. He is an honorary professor at the Jawaharlal Nehru Centre for Advanced Scientific Research and at the Indian Institute of Science Education and Research, Kolkata. He is a Non-resident Permanent fellow of Wissenschaftskolleg zu Berlin. He is a chairman of Research Council for History of Science, Indian National Science Academy, New Delhi. He was elected as a member of the German National Academy of Sciences Leopoldina in July 2012.

In 2004, Gadagkar helped set up the Centre for Contemporary Studies in the Indian Institute of Science. This department aimed to support interdisciplinary discourse.

In the years 2023, 2024 and 2025, Gadagkar was awarded a Senior Fellowship of the Zukunftskollegs at the University of Konstanz.
