= Ivan Izquierdo =

Argentine Brazilian scientist (1937–2021)

Ivan Antonio Izquierdo
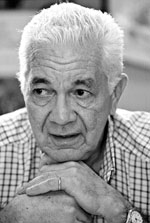
- Born: 16 September 1937; Buenos Aires, Argentina
- Died: 9 February 2021 (aged 83); Porto Alegre, Rio Grande do Sul, Brazil
- Citizenship: Argentinian; Brazilian
- Education: University of Buenos Aires
- Known for: Study of memory in mammals
- Awards: Ordem Nacional do Mérito Científico; Order of Rio Branco; Doctor honoris causa, University of Buenos Aires
- Scientific career
- Fields: Neurology; Neurobiology
- Workplaces: Universidad Nacional de Córdoba; Universidade Federal do Rio Grande do Sul; Pontifícia Universidade Católica do Rio Grande do Sul

Ivan Antonio Izquierdo (16 September 1937 – 9 February 2021) was an Argentine Brazilian scientist and a pioneer in the study of the neurobiology of learning and memory.

Born in 1937 in Buenos Aires, Argentina, Izquierdo graduated in Medicine (1961) and completed his Ph.D. in Pharmacology (1962), both in the University of Buenos Aires (UBA). For nearly a decade, Izquierdo taught at National University of Cordoba (UNC), in Argentina, but, due to a number of reasons, both political (the Argentinian dictatorship) and personal (his wife, Ivone, is Brazilian), he moved to Brazil in the beginning of the 1970s, and lived in Porto Alegre since 1978. For more than 20 years, he worked in the "Center of Memory" of the Biochemistry Department of the Health Basic Sciences Institute (ICBS) at the Federal University of Rio Grande do Sul (UFRGS), where he had an enormous influence on young scientists: he trained 42 Ph.D. students, most of whom hold academic research positions in universities in Brazil and elsewhere. Later, he moved to the Pontifical Catholic University of Rio Grande do Sul (PUCRS) where he continued with his research.

Izquierdo died from pneumonia on 9 February 2021, in Porto Alegre. He was 83.

== Contributions ==
Ivan Izquierdo made several key contributions to the understanding of the cellular basis of brain processes underlying memory storage and retrieval. His research work was focused in the biological mechanisms of memory processes, employing multiple experimental approaches that range from behavioral psychobiology to neurochemistry, pharmacology, neurophysiology and experimental neurology, usually employing intracerebral microinfusions of drugs and assaying its effects upon different brain receptors, cellular processes, and, in particular, behavioral performance in different tasks. He was among the first to reveal the roles of epinephrine, dopamine, endogenous opioid peptides and acetylcholine in modulating memory consolidation and state-dependent memory retrieval. Later he investigated benzodiazepine and GABAergic influences on memory. Some of his main achievements included the molecular bases of memory formation, retrieval, persistence and extinction in the mammal brain, the endogenous state dependency, and the functional discrimination between short and long-term memory.

== Publications ==
Over the years, Ivan Izquierdo published more than 500 scientific papers in refereed journals and was, for years, one of the most cited scientists in Brazil (and Latin America): 13 of his papers have been cited over 100 times, and since 1958 his papers have received over 10,000 citations. He also published 17 books, 6 of which are fiction / chronicle, a recent, parallel avenue of personal interest.

== Memberships and honors ==
He was a member of several Academies of Sciences, in Brazil and abroad - he was elected Foreign Member of the United States National Academy of Sciences on 1 May 2007. He earned more than 30 important national and international awards, including the highest civilian badge of honor of Brazil, the Order of Rio Branco (2007). In Argentina, Izquierdo was the eighth person since 1821 to be named Honorary Professor of the University of Buenos Aires; the other seven were Nobel Laureates. He was a recipient of the 1995 TWAS Prize.

== Sources ==
- New Members Chosen By Academy (The National Academies NEWS, May 1, 2007)
- ORDEM NACIONAL DO MÉRITO CIENTÍFICO - Brazilian Academy of Sciences (in Portuguese)
- Profile of Ivan A Izquierdo - Brazilian Academy of Sciences (in Portuguese)
- Curriculum Vitae of Ivan A Izquierdo (in Portuguese)
