= Giuseppe Cilento =

Brazilian biochemist (1923-1994)

- Born: July 21, 1923; Sorrento, Italy
- Died: October 31, 1994 (aged 73); São Paulo
- Known for: Photochemistry
- Scientific career
- Fields: Chemistry; Molecular biology

Giuseppe Cilento (July 21, 1923 in Sorrento, Italy – October 31, 1994 in São Paulo) was a Brazilian chemist who was born in Italy. He held a professorship at the University of São Paulo and was Professor Emeritus at the State University of Campinas.

== Early life and education ==
Cilento attended the Department of Chemistry, Faculty of Philosophy, Science and Letters, University of São Paulo, São Paulo, Brazil.

Cilento completed a post-doc at Harvard University.

== Awards and honors ==
He received the grã-cruz ("Great Cross") of the Ordem Nacional do Mérito Científico ("National Order of Scientific Merit") of Brazil and the TWAS Prize in 1993.

Cilento was awarded fellowship by the John Simon Guggenheim Memorial Foundation in 1977 and 1981.

The Rockefeller Foundation awarded $4,905 to Cilento and Heinrich Hauptmann for biochemistry research in 1958.

== Contributions ==
Throughout his career, Cilento published over 150 papers.

Cilento was an early pioneer of the paradoxical hypothesis of "photochemistry without light". The hypothesis was based on chemiluminescence and bioluminescence originating from enzymatic and non-enzymatic pathways that produce unstable peroxide intermediates such as 1,2-dioxetanes that fluoresce, ejecting a photon within "dark" biological organisms potentially triggering physiological or pathophysiological responses. He had profound interest in horseradish peroxidase.

An example mechanism resides in keto acids such as phenylpyruvic acid, which under certain circumstances tautomerizes to form a reactive enol. Peroxidation, initiated by reactive oxygen species by enzymatic peroxidases or non-enzymatic pathways, react with the benzylic carbon and alpha-keto carbonyl to form a "squaric" 1,2-dioxetane/dioxetanol. This intermediate is unstable, resulting in the ejection of a photon and subsequent formation of oxalic acid and benzaldehyde in the triplet state. The pathway competes with formation of a peroxylactone that forms benzaldehyde and carbon dioxide and carbon monoxide. Cilento and Villablanca were interested in the biological significance of this specific pathway among others.

Among Cilento's collaborators, many publications on dark-photochemistry were authored with Prof. Waldemar Adam at University of Würzburg. Cilento and Adam described how 1,2-dioxetanes can induce chemical modification of DNA including formation of cyclobutane pyrimidine dimers and oxidation of guanine (from a triplet-state carbonyl and subsequent reactivity with oxygen, exemplified by the phenylpyruvate 1,2-dioxetanol pathway).
