= Cheng Soo-chen =

Taiwanese biochemist (born 1955)

Cheng Soo-chen (Chinese: 鄭淑珍; born 1955) is a Taiwanese biochemist.

== Education and career ==
After graduating from National Taiwan University, Chen attended Duke University from 1978 to 1983, where she earned a doctorate in biochemistry. She conducted postdoctoral research at the National Institutes of Health from 1983 to 1984 and was a research fellow and senior research fellow at Caltech between 1984 and 1988.

Cheng began her affiliation with Academia Sinica in 1977, as a research assistant for the Institute of Biological Chemistry. After returning to Taiwan upon the completion of her Ph.D., Cheng joined Academia Sinica's Institute of Molecular Biology, starting out as an associate research fellow. She was promoted to research fellow in 1994 and became a distinguished research fellow in 2003. Cheng was deputy director of the Institute of Molecular Biology between 2006 and 2008 and served as institute director from 2013 to 2016. She held a joint appointment as distinguished research fellow for the Academia Sinica's Genomics Research Center from 2004 to 2016.

Cheng was adjunct faculty at National Yang-Ming University from 1989 to 2013, and began teaching at National Taiwan University as a full professor in 2013.

== Honors and awards ==
Cheng shared the 2010 TWAS Prize in Biology with Satyajit Mayor. Chang was elected a member of Academia Sinica in 2012, and a fellow of The World Academy of Sciences in 2013.
