= Yang Dan (chemist) =

Hong Kong chemist

- Born: October 1965 (age 60)
- Education: Fudan University; Columbia University; Princeton University; Harvard University
- Scientific career
- Fields: Chemistry; Biology
- Workplaces: Westlake University, Hangzhou

Yang Dan (Chinese: 楊丹; pinyin: Yáng Dān; born October 1965) is a Hong Kong-Chinese chemist and chemical biologist. She is the chair professor in both School of Life Sciences and School of Science in the Westlake University. She was awarded the TWAS Prize for Chemistry in 2010 and the Young Woman Scientist Prize of China in 2011.

== Education ==
Yang graduated with a BS degree from Fudan University in Shanghai, China, and earned her MA degree from Columbia University and her PhD in 1991 from Princeton University in the United States. After 2-year postdoc training with Stuart Schreiber in Harvard University, Yang started her independent career on Organic Chemistry and Chemical Biology at the University of Hong Kong.

== Career ==
Yang joined the Department of Chemistry at the University of Hong Kong (HKU) in 1993, and is now the Chair Professor of Chemistry and the Morningside Professor in Chemical Biology.

Yang's research interests include aminoxy acids and foldamores, triptolide, and oxidation chemistry. She spent 17 years researching and synthesizing potential anti-cancer compounds from the plant Tripterygium wilfordii, for which she was awarded the Young Woman Scientist Prize of China in 2011, the first Hong Kong scientist to win the prize.

In 2010, she was awarded the TWAS Prize in Chemistry for "her significant contributions to the development of novel methods for the synthesis of bioactive natural products and probes for biomedical research."

In 2017, Yang was awarded the Chemical Biology Approach to Molecular Medicine in Areas of Excellence Scheme by University Grants Committee.

In 2020, Yang was awarded the 5th Yoshida Prize by the International Organic Chemistry Foundation (IOCF).

In August 2021, Yang joined Westlake University as a chair professor in both School of Life Sciences and School of Science.

== Research interests ==
- Developing fluorescent/chemiluminescent sensors for molecular detection and imaging of reactive oxygen species, lipids, metabolites and enzymes in living cells to study redox biology and human diseases.
- Developing new molecular probes for proteins and nucleic acids to investigate epigenetic changes in relation to their functions.
- Developing synthetic ion transporters and exploring their biological applications in eradicating cancer stem cells and drug-resistant bacteria.
