= Eduardo Arzt =

Argentine biologist

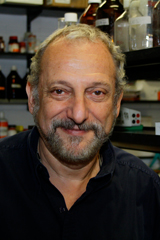
- Born: 22 February 1953 (age 73); Buenos Aires, Argentina
- Awards: Guggenheim Fellowship, Houssay award, Bunge y Born award, Konex award
- Scientific career
- Fields: Molecular Biology
- Workplaces: CONICET, Max Planck Society, UBA

Eduardo Arzt (born February 22, 1953) is an Argentine molecular biologist. He is Master in Experimental Biology, Doctor (Ph.D) from the Faculty of Pharmacy and Biochemistry (University of Buenos Aires). As of 2025, he is a senior researcher at CONICET, distinguished professor of the Faculty of Natural Sciences of the University of Buenos Aires, External Scientific Member of the Max Planck Society (Germany) and director of the Biomedicine Research Institute of Buenos Aires – CONICET – Partner Institute of the Max Planck Society.

== Contribution and recognition ==
His scientific contributions stand him out as an internationally recognized personality in the field of molecular neuroendocrinology. His laboratory contributed to the discovery of new genes and pathways involved in the physiological adaptation to homeostasis in response to stress, hypoxia (lack of cellular oxygen), physiopathological processes (pituitary tumors), and to the discovery of new targets for pharmacological treatments.

He is known not only for his findings, which are an example of research in biomedicine, transferring results from basic molecular biology to pharmacological applications, but also for his vast institutional achievements for Argentine and Latin-American science, including an active role in the development and realization of the project of the Polo Científico Tecnológico and the creation of the Biomedicine Research Institute of Buenos Aires – CONICET – Partner Institute of the Max Planck Society. He has received, for its ongoing work, both Argentine (Bunge and Born Award, Houssay Award) and International (Guggenheim Fellowship, External Scientific Member of the Max Planck Society, Order of Merit of the Federal Republic of Germany, Berthold Medal, TWAS Prize) awards and distinctions.

== Bibliographic review / career ==
In 1970 he graduated from the Colegio Nacional de Buenos Aires, Argentina. The following year, he enrolled at the Faculty of Pharmacy and Biochemistry of the University of Buenos Aires, and graduated in 1978.

In 1981 he began a Masters in Experimental Biology at the Universidad Autonoma Metropolitana, Mexico, and his Master's Thesis was on transportation models in biological membranes (1984).

From 1985 to 1988 at the UBA Faculty of Pharmacy and Biochemistry, he conducted his Ph.D. in cellular mechanisms involved in immune-neuroendocrine pathways, at the Institute for Medical Research A. Lanari, of the Faculty of Medicine (UBA).

In 1989 he joined the Scientific Researcher Career of CONICET, Argentina, where he is now a Senior Researcher.

In 1995 he obtained the position of Professor in Molecular and Cellular Biology, Faculty of Natural Sciences (UBA).

In 1997 he participated as co-Founder and Director of the Laboratorio de Fisiología y Biología Molecular (LFBM-FCEN-UBA) [Laboratory of Physiology and Molecular Biology].

In 2005 he was appointed External Scientific Member of the Max Planck Society.

In 2007 he participated in the agreement for the establishment of the Biomedicine Research Institute of Buenos Aires – CONICET – Partner Institute of the Max Planck Society (IBioBA), whose construction was completed in 2012 at the Polo Científico y Tecnológico.

== Awards and distinctions ==
- 1987 – UAM – Mexico, in the field of Biological Sciences and Health. Prize for his master thesis "Formation of oligomers of ion transporters by Nigericin".
- 1993 – Award: cover of the journal Endocrinology Vol. 132.
- 1997 – Guggenheim fellowship, awarded by the John Simon Guggenheim Memorial Foundation. New York, United States.
- 1997 – "Lucio Cherny" award, for the best presentation, XLII Congress of Clinical Research Argentine Society, Mar del Plata.
- 2001 – The presentation "Transcriptional regulation of the gp130 cytokine IL-6 by PACAP and estrogens: its importance for anterior pituitary pathophysiology" was selected as "hot topic" in the 7th International Pituitary Congress. Phoenix- United States
- 2002 – "Lucio Cherny" award for the best presentation, XLVII XLII Congress of Clinical Research Argentine Society, Mar del Plata.
- 2003 – "Bernardo Houssay, to Scientific and Technological Research" award, Ministry of Science and Technology, Argentina.
- 2005 – Appointed External Scientific Member of the Max Planck Society, Germany.
- 2006 – Award: cover of the journal Trends Pharmacol Sci.
- 2008 – Bunge and Born award. Experimental Medicine.
- 2011 – Federal Cross of Merit of the Federal Republic of Germany for the commitment to the development of scientific cooperation between Germany and Argentina, and by participation in the founding of the binational Biomedicine Max Planck Institute in Buenos Aires.
- 2011 – Award: Cover of the journal Neuroendocrinology Vol. 94.
- 2013 – Konex award, Argentina. Molecular Biology and biochemistry.
- 2015 – TWAS Prize in Medical Sciences.
- 2017 – Berthold Medal, awarded by the German Society for Endocrinology.
