= Shah M. Faruque =

Medical researcher

Shah Mohammad Faruque
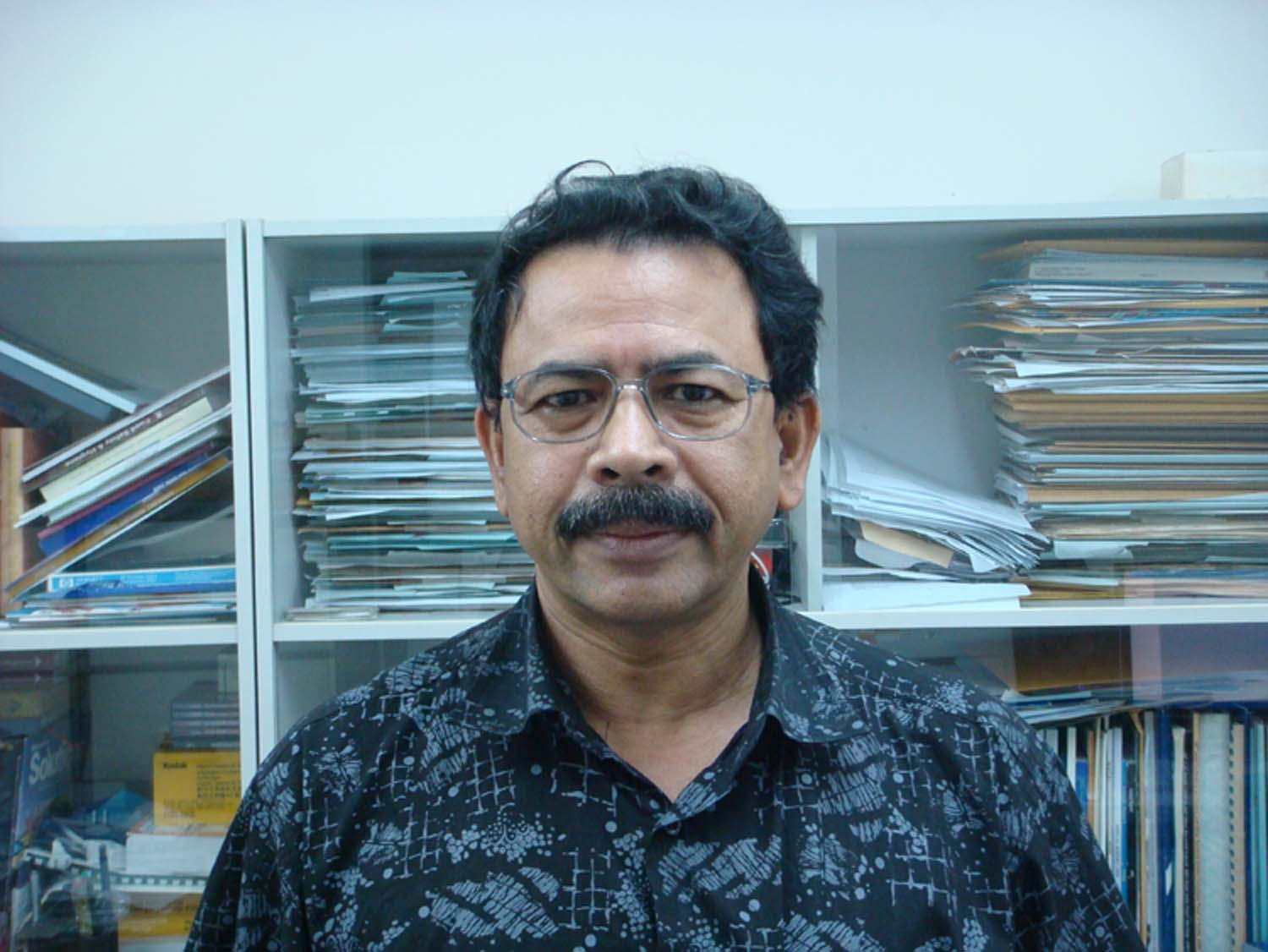
- Born: 1956 (age 69–70); Jessore District, Bangladesh
- Education: University of Dhaka; University of Reading

Shah Mohammad Faruque (Bengali: শাহ মোহাম্মদ ফারুক; born c. 1956) is a professor in the School of Environment and Life Sciences at Independent University Bangladesh (IUB). He is widely recognized for his research in Vibrio cholerae, the bacterium which causes the epidemic diarrhoeal disease Cholera. Among other positions, previously he was a professor at BRAC University; director of the Genomics Centre at the International Centre for Diarrhoeal Disease Research, Bangladesh (ICDDR,B), and formerly director of the Centre for Food and Water Borne Diseases in ICDDR,B. His areas of research interest include microbial genomics, bacteriophages, environmental microbiology, ecology, and evolution of bacterial pathogens, particularly those associated with waterborne and foodborne diseases. Faruque is primarily known for his work in genomics, epidemiology and ecology of the cholera pathogen, and its bacteriophages.

Faruque is a Fellow of TWAS, the World Academy of Sciences, as well as a Fellow of the Bangladesh Academy of Sciences.

== Early life and education ==
Shah Mohammad Faruque was born in Jessore District, Bangladesh in 1956. He received his early education in Jessore Sacred Heart School, Jessore Zilla School, Jhenidah Cadet College, and Jessore Government M.M. College. Faruque received his BSc, and MSc degrees from the department of Biochemistry, Dhaka University in 1978 and 1979 respectively. He obtained his PhD in 1988 from the University of Reading, in the UK. In Reading, he worked on hormonal regulation of gene expression. He was a Commonwealth Scholar in the UK.

== Career ==
Faruque joined the faculty of the Department of Biochemistry at the University of Dhaka and taught biochemistry and molecular biology courses. He later joined ICDDR,B as a scientist, and pioneered molecular biology research in Bangladesh. In recognition of his contributions to the understanding of natural phenomena associated with the dynamics of cholera epidemics, and molecular mechanisms in the evolution of pathogenic Vibrio cholerae, he was awarded the "TWAS Prize-2005" in Medical Sciences, by The World Academy of Sciences TWAS. Faruque collaborates with scientists from different countries and Institutes in India, Japan, Thailand, Sweden, UK, and the US. He also established the Genomics Centre in ICDDR,B with financial support by the Swedish International Development Cooperation Agency (SIDA). Faruque maintained an active research team in icddr,b for over two decades, and then moved to BRAC University to strengthen life science research in one of the nation's premier private universities. Later he joined Independent University, Bangladesh (IUB), and worked as the Dean of the School of Environment and Life Sciences in IUB.

Addressing the health problems of developing countries, Faruque has contributed significantly to the understanding of natural mechanisms associated with the emergence of bacterial pathogens. Although he has conducted significant work in understanding the epidemiology and transmission of Shigella and diarrhoeagenic Escherichia coli infections, his major contribution is in the epidemiology and genetics of Vibrio cholerae, the causative agent of cholera epidemics. In collaboration with John Mekalanos, Adele H. Lehman Professor of Microbiology, Harvard Medical School, Boston, Faruque has contributed extensively to the recent understanding of the epidemiology, transmissibility and ecology of Vibrio cholerae. Their work showed the genetic basis for the origin and evolution of new Vibrio cholerae strains with epidemic potential and the role of bacteriophages in this process. They discovered and characterised several novel filamentous phages (e.g., KSF-1, RS1 and TLC satellite phages) of Vibrio cholerae, and contributed substantially to understanding the molecular mechanisms for transmission of these phages, and their role in Vibrio cholerae evolution. Faruque has proposed models to explain the role of environmental and host factors and lytic bacteriophages in the ecology of Vibrio cholerae, that supports a self-limiting nature of seasonal cholera epidemics. His team has also conducted cutting-edge research in CRISPR-Cas systems carried by bacterial viruses such as the JSF series of bacteriophages, isolated and characterized by them. It is vital to generate more knowledge on the underlying diversity and functions of this system to fully realize the potential of technologies like CRISPR gene editing. Currently Faruque and his team have been studying the role of quorum sensing and bacterial communication through molecular signals in the environmental biology and epidemiology of the cholera pathogen.

== Awards ==
Faruque was awarded the TWAS Prize in Medical Sciences in 2005.

== Personal life ==
Faruque is married to Hasna Hena. They have two children - Elora Faruque and Shah Nayeem Faruque.

== Publications ==
Faruque has authored more numerous original research papers, reviews, and book chapters. His papers have been published in top ranking international scientific journals, including Nature, PNAS, Lancet and ASM Journals. He has also edited a number of books which include Vibrio cholerae: Genomics and Molecular Biology (2008), and Foodborne and Waterborne Bacterial Pathogens (2012).
