= Liao Shantao =

Chinese mathematician (1920-1997)

- 廖山涛
- Born: January 4, 1920; Hengshan County, Hunan, China
- Died: June 6, 1997 (aged 77); Beijing, China
- Education: National Southwestern Associated University (BS); University of Chicago (PhD)
- Spouse: Wang Hongyi
- Children: 3
- Scientific career
- Fields: Mathematics
- Workplaces: Chinese Academy of Sciences
- Doctoral advisor: Shiing-Shen Chern

Liao Shantao (simplified Chinese: 廖山涛; traditional Chinese: 廖山濤; pinyin: Liào Shāntāo; 4 January 1920 - 6 June 1997) was a Chinese mathematician.

== Biography ==
Liao was born on January 4, 1920, to a family of farmers in Hengshan County, Hunan. His father was Liao Zihao (Chinese: 廖子豪) and his mother was Zeng Ping (Chinese: 曾平). He attended Mingde Middle School and Changsha No. 1 High School in Changsha, capital of Hunan province. In 1938 he was accepted to National Southwestern Associated University and graduated in 1941. After graduation, he taught at Mingde Middle School. He moved to Peking University in 1946 as an associate professor and then to Academia Sinica as a research assistant in 1948. He pursued advanced studies in the United States, earning his Ph.D. from the University of Chicago in 1952. His doctoral dissertation was directed by Shiing-Shen Chern. He did post-doctoral research at Princeton University from 1953 to 1955.

Liao gave up the job that mathematician Norman Steenrod had arranged for him in scientific research at Princeton University and returned to China in 1956 as a professor at Peking University.

In 1986 he was elected a fellow of The World Academy of Sciences.

In 1991 he was elected an academician of the Chinese Academy of Sciences.

== Personal life ==
Liao married Wang Hongyi (Chinese: 汪鸿仪) in 1942, the couple had three sons.

== Awards ==
- 1982 Second Class Prize of State Natural Science Award
- 1988 First Class Prize of State Natural Science Award
