= Chiang Ann-shyn =

Taiwanese entomologist and neuroscientist (born 1958)

Chiang Ann-shyn (Chinese: 江安世; born 1958) is a Taiwanese neuroscientist recognized for his pioneering contributions to Drosophila connectomics and the mapping of memory-related neural circuits. He currently serves as the Honorary Director of the Brain Spatiomics Center at China Medical University Hospital.

== Education ==
Chiang obtained a Bachelor of Science in entomology at National Chung Hsing University in 1981, earned a master's degree in plant pathology and entomology from National Taiwan University, then moved to the United States, where he completed a doctorate in entomology at Rutgers University in 1990. Chiang's doctoral dissertation was titled Developmental Regulation of Juvenile Hormone Biosynthesis in Female Cockroaches. Upon completing his postdoctoral research under Coby Schal at Rutgers in 1992, Chiang returned to Taiwan.

== Career ==
Chiang began his teaching career as an associate professor at National Tsing Hua University, and was promoted to a full professorship in 1997. He led NTHU's Institute of Biotechnology from 2002 to 2008, and since 2004, has been director of the NTHU Brain Research Center. In 2007, Chiang was appointed to a Tsing Hua Chair Professorship, which became a Distinguished Tsing Hua Chair Professorship and the deanship of the NTHU College of Life Sciences in 2014. He has held an adjunct professorship at National Central University since 2005, an adjunct chair professorship at Kaohsiung Medical University since 2014, and an adjunct distinguished chair professorship at China Medical University since 2016. Adjunct Roles and advisory appointments at numerous prestigious institutions, including Academia Sinica, the Kavli Institute for Brain and Mind, Cold Spring Harbor Laboratory, the Ministry of Education as a Tenured Chair Professor, National Health Research Institutes, and the National Synchrotron Radiation Research Center, among others.

== Research and Achievements ==
Chiang is a leader in the field of connectomics, focused on understanding how the brain processes information and stores memory. His notable achievements include:

1. Odor Representation: Discovered neuronal temporal identity and mechanisms for gating CO2 information (Cell, 2006; Cell 2007; Science, 2013; Science Advances 2025).
2. Long-Term Memory: Identified that LTM requires protein synthesis in specific subsets of neurons (Science, 2012; Cell Reports, 2023; Current Biology, 2024; PNAS 2025; Cell Reports, 2026).
3. 3D Fly Brain Database: Developed the first brain-wide wiring map at single-neuron resolution, aiding sensory circuit analysis (Current Biology, 2011; Nature Communications, 2015).
4. Tissue Clearing Technology: Created FocusClear, the first tissue-clearing reagent compatible with GFP for high-resolution 3D imaging at 30 nm resolution (Nature Communications, 2019).

== Awards and honors ==
- Academician, Academia Sinica (2014).
- Fellow, The World Academy of Sciences (TWAS) (2016).
- National Chair Professorship Award, Ministry of Education (2015, 2021).
- TWAS Prize in Biology (2012).
- Outstanding Contributions in Science & Technology, Executive Yuan (2007)
- FUTURE TECH Award, National Science and Technology Council (2018, 2020, 2021, 2022).
- Outstanding Research Award, MOST/Ministry of Science and Technology (2004, 2010, 2013).
- Distinguished Chair Professor for Research, NTHU (2007-present)
- Adjunct Tenured Chair Professor, National Chiao Tung University (2024-present)

== Selected Publications ==
(Nearly 160 publications; full list available upon request. *Corresponding author; IF = impact factor.)

1. Science Advances (2025): "Hybrid neural networks in the mushroom body drive olfactory preference in Drosophila." (IF: 14.136)
2. PNAS (2024): "Thirst-driven hygrosensory suppression promotes water seeking in Drosophila." (IF: 11.205)
3. Small Structures (2024): "Super resolution imaging in collagen abundant thick tissues." (IF: 15.9)
4. Current Biology (2024): "Asymmetric neurons are necessary for olfactory learning in the Drosophila brain." (IF: 10.834)
5. Nature Methods (2023): "BigNeuron: A resource to benchmark and predict performance of algorithms for automated tracing of neurons in light microscopy datasets." (IF: 47.99)
6. Physics Reports (2023): "SYNAPSE: An international roadmap to large brain imaging." (IF: 25.6)
7. PNAS (2022): "CREBB repression of protein synthesis in mushroom body gates long-term memory formation in Drosophila." (IF: 11.205)
8. PNAS (2021): "CREBA and CREBB in two identified neurons gate long-term memory formation in Drosophila." (IF: 11.205)
9. Nature Communications (2019): "Rapid single-wavelength lightsheet localization microscopy for clarified tissue." (IF: 14.919)
10. PNAS (2019): "Forgetting memories through distinct actin remodeling mechanisms." (IF: 11.205)
11. Nature Nanotechnology (2019): "Delivery of nitric oxide with a nanocarrier promotes tumour vessel normalization and potentiates anti-cancer therapies." (IF: 39.213)
12. Nature Communications (2019): "Asymmetric ephaptic inhibition between compartmentalized olfactory receptor neurons." (IF: 14.919)
13. Nature Communications (2015): "Parallel circuits control temperature preference in Drosophila during aging." (IF: 14.919)
14. Current Biology (2015): "Connectomics-based analysis of information flow in the Drosophila brain." (IF: 10.834)
15. PNAS (2014): "Optogenetic control of selective neural activity in multiple freely moving Drosophila adults." (IF: 11.205)
16. Current Biology (2013): "An octopamine-mushroom body circuit modulates the formation of anesthesia-resistant memory in Drosophila." (IF: 10.834)
17. Science (2013): "Parallel neural pathways mediate CO2 avoidance responses in Drosophila." (IF: 47.728)
18. Neuron (2013): "Distinct roles of TRP channels in auditory transduction and amplification in Drosophila." (IF: 15.982)
19. Science (2012): "Visualizing long-term memory formation in two neurons of the Drosophila brain." (IF: 47.728)
20. PNAS (2012): "Auditory circuit in the Drosophila brain." (IF: 11.205)
21. PNAS (2011): "Serotonin-mushroom body circuit modulating the formation of anesthesia-resistant memory in Drosophila." (IF: 11.205)
22. Nature Neuroscience (2007): "Specific requirement of NMDA receptors for long-term memory consolidation in Drosophila ellipsoid body." (IF: 24.884)
23. Cell (2007): "A map of olfactory representation in the Drosophila mushroom body." (IF: 41.582)
24. Cell (2006): "Gradients of the Drosophila chinmo BTB-zinc finger protein govern neuronal temporal identity." (IF: 41.582)
25. Neuron (2003): "Aging specifically impairs amnesiac-dependent memory in Drosophila." (IF: 15.982)
