= Mysore A. Viswamitra =

Indian molecular biophysicist and crystallographer (1932–2001)

- Born: 14 November 1932; Shimoga, Karnataka, India
- Died: 10 April 2001 (aged 68)
- Education: University of Mysore; Banaras Hindu University; Indian Institute of Science
- Known for: X-ray structural studies of DNA fragments
- Awards: 1982 ASI C.V. Raman Award; 1984 UGC J.C. Bose Award; 1986 TWAS Prize; 1986 INSA J. C. Bose Medal; 1988 R.D. Birla National Award; 1991 FICCI Award; 1993 INSA S.S. Bhatnagar Medal; 1998 National Citizens Award; 1999 IISc Distinguished Alumni Award
- Scientific career
- Fields: Molecular biophysics; Crystallography
- Workplaces: Indian Institute of Science; University of Cambridge

Mysore Ananthamurthy Viswamitra (14 November 1932 – 10 April 2001) was an Indian molecular biophysicist and crystallographer, known for his pioneering work on the X-ray structural studies of DNA fragments and nucleotide coenzyme molecules. His work is reported to have assisted in the development of the concept of sequence-dependent oligonucleotide conformation. He was an INSA senior scientist and an MSIL chair professor of physics at the Indian Institute of Science and a visiting professor at the University of Cambridge.

== Biography ==
Born on 14 November 1932, in Shimoga, in the south Indian state of Karnataka, Viswamitra did his early education at the University of Mysore and Banaras Hindu University before securing a PhD from the Indian Institute of Science (IISc) and joined IISc in 1954. He served IISc till his superannuation in 1993 during which time he founded the School of Biocrystallography and the Bioinformatics Centre at the institution. He is reported to have determined the structure of a number of mononucleotides for the first time and, along with Olga Kennard, elucidated the oligonucleotide dp(AT)2 structure leading to the first atomic detail view of a DNA duplex. His studies have been documented by way of a number of articles (Note: Please see Selected bibliography section) and ResearchGate, an online repository of scientific articles has listed 141 of them.

Viswamitra was an elected fellow of all the three major Indian science academies viz. the Indian Academy of Sciences, the Indian National Science Academy, and the National Academy of Sciences, India, as well as the World Academy of Sciences (TWAS). He was a recipient of a number of awards which included C. V. Raman Award of the Acoustical Society of India (1982), J. C. Bose Award of the University Grants Commission of India (1984), TWAS Prize (1986), J. C. Bose Medal of the INSA (1986), R.D. Birla National Award (1988), FICCI Award (1991), S. S. Bhatnagar Medal of the Indian National Science Academy (1993), National Citizens Award (1998) and the Distinguished Alumni Award of the Indian Institute of Science (1999).

Viswamitra died, succumbing to a heart attack, on 10 April 2001, at the age of 68, survived by his wife and son. The death occurred immediately after he delivered a public speech at the condolence meeting of his colleague, G. N. Ramachandran.

== Selected bibliography ==
- Viswamitra, M. A.; Latha, K. S.; Rao, Jagannatha K. S.; Suram, Anitha (1 December 2002). "First evidence to show the topological change of DNA from B-DNA to Z-DNA conformation in the hippocampus of Alzheimer's brain". NeuroMolecular Medicine. 2 (3): 289–297. doi:10.1385/NMM:2:3:289. ISSN 1559-1174. PMID 12622407. S2CID 29059186.
- Siddaramaiah Latha, Kallur; Suram, Anitha; Jagannatha, Rao; Ananthamurthy Viswamitra, Mysore (1 November 2002). "Molecular understanding of aluminum-induced topological changes in (CCG)12 triplet repeats: Relevance to neurological disorders". Biochimica et Biophysica Acta (BBA) - Molecular Basis of Disease. 1588 (1): 56–64. doi:10.1016/S0925-4439(02)00133-3. PMID 12379314.
- Narayana, Narendra; Shamala, N.; Ganesh, Krishna N.; Viswamitra, M. A. (1 January 2006). "Interaction between the Z-Type DNA Duplex and 1,3-Propanediamine: Crystal Structure of d(CACGTG)2 at 1.2 Å Resolution". Biochemistry. 45 (4): 1200–1211. doi:10.1021/bi051569l. ISSN 0006-2960. PMID 16430216.
- Eswaran, S. V.; Neela, H. Y.; Ramakumar, S.; Viswamitra, M. A. (1997). "ChemInform Abstract: The Unusual Formation of Methyl α-(5,6-Dimethoxycarbonyl-2,3- dimethoxyazepin-7-ylidene)-α-(5-methoxycarbonyl-2,3- dimethoxypyrid-6-yl)acetate (V) During the Pyrolysis of "Azido-meta- hemipinate" (IV). First Example of a Reaction Involving a Concomitant Ring Expansion and Ring Extrusion". ChemInform. 28 (1): no. doi:10.1002/chin.199701217. ISSN 1522-2667.
- Viswamitra, Mysore A.; Padmaja, Natarajan; Prabhakar, Chebiyyam; Mehta, Goverdhan (1 January 1992). "New triquinane-based host molecules: binding with diamines". Journal of the Chemical Society, Perkin Transactions 1 (14): 1747–1749. doi:10.1039/P19920001747. ISSN 1364-5463.
- Padmaja, N.; Ramakumar, S.; Viswamitra, M. A. (1991). "ChemInform Abstract: Structure of 5-Methylcytidine". ChemInform. 22 (40): no. doi:10.1002/chin.199140241. ISSN 1522-2667.

== See also ==
- Nucleic acid double helix
- List of TWAS Prize laureates
