= Pneumococcal Awareness Council of Experts =

Pneumococcal Awareness Council of Experts (PACE)
- Location: United States
- Key people: Ciro A. de Quadros; Orin Levine
- Established: December 2006

The Pneumococcal Awareness Council of Experts (PACE) is a project of the Sabin Vaccine Institute and is composed of global experts in infectious diseases and vaccines. Established in December 2006, The Council seeks to raise awareness among policymakers and aims to secure global commitments to prevent pneumococcal disease, a leading infectious killer of children and adults worldwide. The Council works in collaboration and partnership with countries, NGOs, academia and industry.

== Council Members ==
PACE is made up of 21 global experts on infectious diseases and vaccines from 17 countries around the world. The Council is chaired by Ciro A. de Quadros, Executive Vice President of the Sabin Vaccine Institute and Orin Levine, Executive Director of PneumoADIP at the Johns Hopkins Bloomberg School of Public Health.

Council Member	Affiliation	Country
Ciro A. de Quadros, Chair	Sabin Vaccine Institute	USA
Orin Levine, Chair	AVI, Johns Hopkins University Bloomberg School of Public Health	USA
Zulfiqar A. Bhutta	Aga Khan University	Pakistan
Lulu C. Bravo	Philippine General Hospital	Philippines
Ron Dagan	Soroka University Medical Center	Israel
Calil Farhat	Federal University of São Paulo	Brazil
Jesus M. Feris	Robert Reid Cabral Children’s Hospital	Dominican Republic
Javier Garau	European Society of Clinical Microbiology and Infectious Diseases	Spain
Najwa Khuri-Bulos	Jordan University Hospital	Jordan
Keith Klugman	Emory University	USA
Pavla Krizova	National Institute of Public Health	Czech Republic
Shabir Madhi	National Research Foundation	South Africa
David Murdoch	Christchurch School of Medicine & Health Sciences	New Zealand
Hans Rosling	Karolinska Institute	Sweden
Samir K. Saha	Dhaka Shishu Hospital	Bangladesh
José Ignacio Santos	National Autonomous University of Mexico	Mexico
Mathuram Santosham	AVI, Johns Hopkins University Bloomberg School of Public Health	USA
Samba Sow	Center for Vaccine Development	Mali
Fred Were	Kenya Paediatric Association	Kenya
Cynthia Whitney	U.S. Centers for Diseases Control and Prevention	USA
Yong-Hong Yang	Beijing Children’s Hospital	China

== Events ==
PACE has hosted and participated in a number of events worldwide to help raise awareness about pneumococcal disease.

On May 4, 2007, the launch of PACE was announced at a press conference in Washington, D.C. At the event, PACE gave its first annual Global Leadership Award. The Global Leadership Award is given annually by PACE to recognize an individual, organization or country that has championed pneumococcal disease prevention and made a significant contribution towards policies that advance the introduction of pneumococcal conjugate vaccines. PACE Global Leadership Award recipients include: Dr. Thomas Cherian, who has helped accelerate the surveillance of pneumonia throughout the developing world and contributed to research on the global pneumococcal disease burden. The Health Minister of Rwanda – the first country in Africa to introduce pneumococcal conjugate vaccines; and the Health Minister of Costa Rica – the first country in Latin America to implement a nationwide vaccination program.

On November 20, 2007, PACE's European launch took place in Prague, Czech Republic with representatives from professional societies, PACE member Pavla Krizova, and the Czech Ministry of Health in attendance.

On February 15, 2008, PACE held a press event during the 3rd Regional Pneumococcal Symposium in Istanbul, Turkey to call upon policy leaders in Turkey and the region to assure access to pneumococcal vaccines and to support the expansion of health systems to deliver them and monitor their impact.

On June 10, 2008, PACE along with the Sabin Vaccine Institute, PATH and PneumoADIP, participated in the 6th International Symposium on Pneumococci and Pneumococcal Diseases (ISPPD-6) in Reykjavík, Iceland. PACE issued a Global Call to Action on Pneumococcal Disease Prevention, urging governments to take steps to make financing available for access to pneumococcal vaccines.

On October 24, 2008, over 100 professional medical societies, institutions and organizations from around the world had signed PACE’s Global Call to Action to urge governments, donors and industry to ensure access to pneumococcal vaccines. Rwanda announced that they would be one of the first two countries to introduce the pneumococcal vaccine into its national immunization program in the spring of 2009.

On January 31, 2009 PACE and the Hib Initiative hosted Childhood Pneumonia and Meningitis: Recent Advances at Aga Khan University in Karachi, Pakistan. The event, brought together stakeholders in child health from Pakistan, including health professionals, representatives from the Ministry of Health and EPI officials. Event leaders, PACE Co-chair Dr. Ciro de Quadros and PACE member Dr. Zulfiqar Bhutta, highlighted the role of advocacy in combating childhood pneumonia and meningitis.

On March 3, 2009, PACE, in conjunction with the Sabin Vaccine Institute, PneumoADIP and the WHO, hosted a media briefing at the Sabin Vaccine Institute's 4th Regional Pneumococcal Symposium in Johannesburg, South Africa, at which PACE released two new studies, Sequelae Due to Bacterial Meningitis among African Children: A Systematic Literature Review, and Bacterial Infections in Persons with Sickle Cell Disease: A Review of Data from Africa with a Focus on Pneumococcal Disease. The event also sought to highlight South Africa's introduction of the pneumococcal vaccine, with support from the GAVI Alliance.

In October 2009, PACE conducted a briefing and one-on-one meetings with members of the European Parliament and European Commission to recommend action on pneumococcal disease.

On November 1–2, 2009 PACE, a member of the World Pneumonia Day Coalition, sponsored a press conference, policymaker roundtable, rally, march and symposium to commemorate World Pneumonia Day in Bangladesh where the country’s leaders and advocates focused their attention on the prevention and treatment of pneumonia. These events and activities were led by PACE member Dr. Samir K. Saha. PACE World Pneumonia Day events also took place in Brazil, Dominican Republic, Kenya, South Africa, the Czech Republic, Israel, Pakistan, China and the Philippines.

== Global Call to Action on Pneumococcal Disease ==
In 2008, PACE launched its Global Call to Action on Pneumococcal Disease Prevention in partnership with 114 professional medical societies, organizations and institutions from around the world.

== PACE Commissioned Studies ==
PACE commissioned two studies, Sequelae Due to Bacterial Meningitis among African Children: A Systematic Literature Review, and Bacterial Infections in Persons with Sickle Cell Disease: A Review of Data from Africa with a Focus on Pneumococcal Disease, that highlighted the increased risk for children in Africa of contracting pneumococcal disease and suffering its devastating consequences. It was found that African children who contract pneumococcal disease are 36 times as likely to have sickle-cell disease, a blood disorder prevalent in African children that increases the risk for infectious diseases and early death. Inn addition, the research showed that up to one-half of all children in Africa who get pneumococcal meningitis will either die or be disabled as a consequence of the disease, even when treated with antibiotics in a hospital. As the three leading causes of bacterial meningitis in childhood are vaccine preventable, the regular use of conjugate vaccines would reduce the high burden of morbidity and mortality in both epidemic and endemic settings.
