= Naila Zaman Khan =

Bangladeshi neurologist

- Education: MBBS, FCPS (Pediatrics) PhD in Neurodevelopmental Pediatrics (London)
- Alma mater: Dhaka Medical College and Hospital
- Occupations: Professor of Child Neurology and Development

Naila Zaman Khan is a Bangladeshi neurologist. She was the founder head of the Department of Pediatric Neuroscience, Dhaka Shishu Hospital, Bangladesh Institute of Child Health in 1992, till 2018. She is the founder chairperson of the Shishu Bikash Network, General Secretary of the Bangladesh Protibondhi Foundation, Secretary General of the Bangladesh Society for Child Neurology, Development and Disability, and Chairperson of the Bangladesh Society of Pediatric Neuro Electro- Physiologists (BSPNEP). From 2008 to 2018 she was the National Co-ordinator, Ministry of Health, for the establishment of multidisciplinary Child Development Centers in government tertiary and secondary hospitals.

== Early life and education ==
Khan passed Secondary School Certificate (SSC) from Dhaka board at 1968. In 1970, She completed Higher Secondary School Certificate (HSC). In 1977, She completed her M.B.B.S degree from Dhaka Medical College. She was awarded Fellowship (FCPS) from Bangladesh College of Physicians and Surgeons in 1984. She completed her PhD at Neurosciences Unit, Institute of Child Health, University of London In 1991.

== Career ==
Khan has been involved with various national issues which is an outcome of her clinical work and research, through health activism, community engagement and socio-political forums. She brought the issue of lead poisoning through leaded petrol into the limelight with her findings. This resulted in the banning of leaded petrol by the government within a few weeks. From 1994 till date she has been actively involved with the Sammilita Nari Samaj to protest against state violence against women and children, and to formulate laws to protect them. She spoke out against injustice. She called for the formation of an EC by law in 2021 And he demanded that former Prime Minister Khaleda Zia take the necessary steps to go abroad for speedy treatment in 2021.

Khan has been the Secretary-General of the Bangladesh Society for Child Neurology, Development and Disability from 2006. She is the General Secretary of the Bangladesh Protibondhi Foundation since 2008.

== Chapters ==
- Nargis Islam, Nishat F. Rahman, Naila Z. Khan. Mental Health and Trauma in the Rohingya Camps. In Bangladesh Health Watch: Health Sector’s Response to The Rohingya Crisis, 2019.

== Award ==
- "Successful Individual" (Shophol Bekti) Award on the 11th World Autism Awareness Day by the Prime Minister of Bangladesh Sheikh Hasina under the aegis of the Ministry of Social Welfare, Government of Bangladesh.(2018)
