= Samir Kumar Saha =

Bangladeshi Scientist

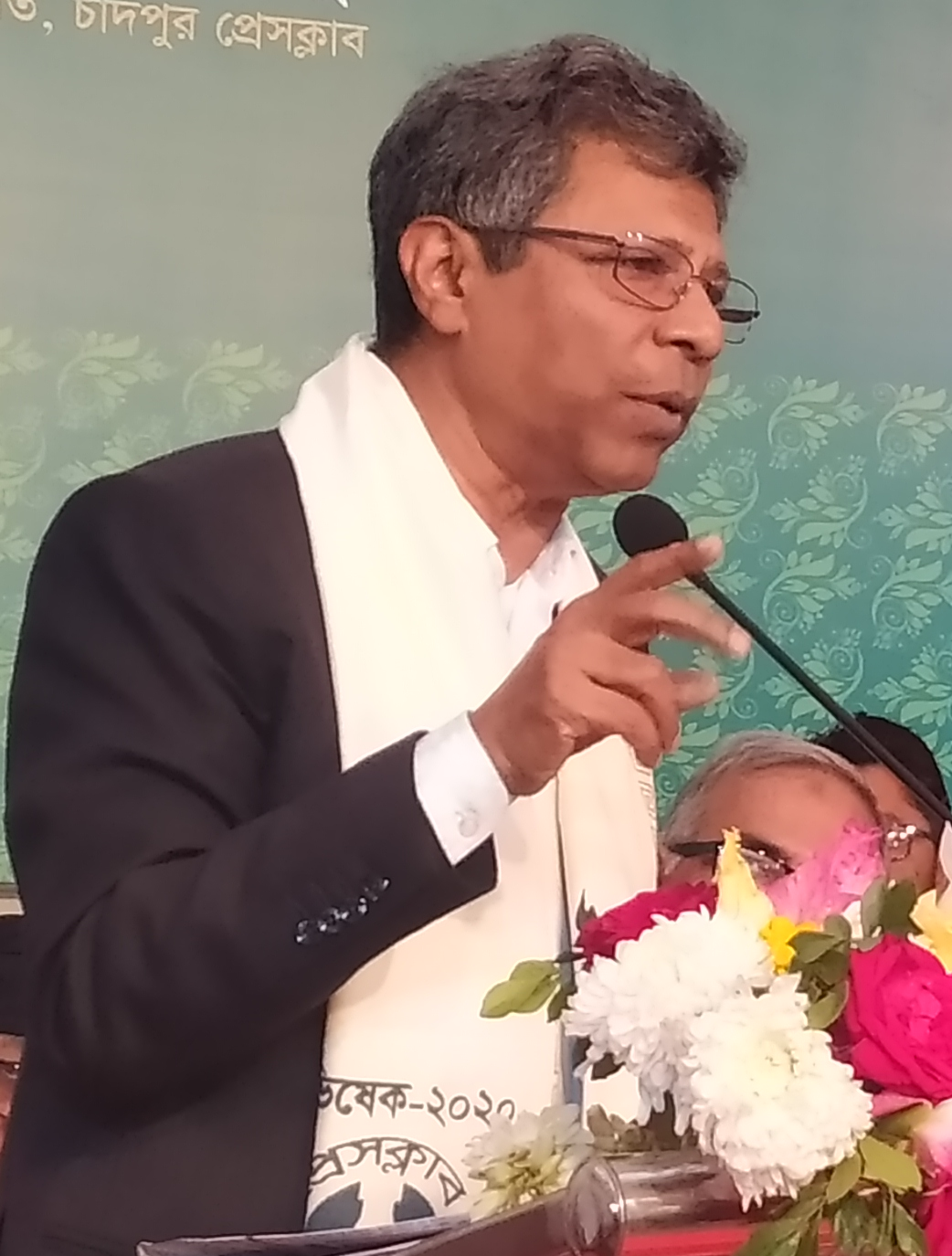
- Born: December 28, 1955 (age 70)
- Education: University of Dhaka (MS); Institute of Medical Sciences, Banaras Hindu University (PhD)
- Awards: American Society for Microbiology (2017); UNESCO Carlos J. Finlay Prize for Microbiology (2017)
- Scientific career
- Fields: Microbiology
- Workplaces: Dhaka Shishu Hospital

Samir Kumar Saha (born December 28, 1955) is an eminent Bangladeshi microbiologist and public health expert. He is the professor, senior consultant and head of the department of Diagnostic Division of Microbiology at the Dhaka Shishu Hospital for children and also the executive director of The Child Health Research Foundation (CHRF) at the Bangladesh Institute of Child Health.

== Education ==
Saha attended Chandpur Government College. He earned his BSc. and MSc. from The University of Dhaka in 1983, and his PhD from the Institute of Medical Sciences of Banaras Hindu University, Varanasi, India, in 1989.

== Career ==
Saha is known for his research on pediatric infectious diseases specializing in pneumonia, meningitis and enteric fever. He is focused on finding the true burden of these diseases, their causative organisms, drug resistance patterns and serotype distributions.

In 2017, Saha was the first scientist from a developing country to receive the American Society for Microbiology (ASM) award for his outstanding research in Clinical Microbiology. Following which he has been elected to Fellowship in the American Academy of Microbiology. The same year Saha received the UNESCO Carlos J. Finlay Prize in Microbiology, along with Shahida Hasnain, also a renowned Pakistani microbiologist for research and work in the field of microbiology. The November 2017 edition of National Geographic Magazine published "Here's Why Vaccines Are So Crucial", an article revolving around the need and impact of vaccines in society and vividly highlighted the lifelong dedication of Saha's fight to beating pneumonia and other pneumococcal infections in Bangladesh. After the publication of the article Saha was invited to attend a panel discussion on the various aspects of pneumococcal vaccines and vaccines in general, hosted and broadcast by National Geographic, and the Bill and Melinda Gates Foundation at the International Vaccine Access Center, the Johns Hopkins Bloomberg School of Public Health, Baltimore, US.

== Personal life ==
Samir Kumar Saha is microbiologist Senjuti Saha's father. His wife, Dr. Setarunnahar Setara, is a public health researcher. His youngest son is also a microbiologist by profession.

== Achievements ==
Saha played a key role in implementing vaccines against two bacteria that cause meningitis and pneumonia in Bangladesh. It had a direct positive impact on the health of children in the country.

As a leading researcher in paediatrics, he has been performing surveillance on invasive childhood diseases in Bangladesh for more than a decade. He has also led research into the resistance to treatment of some pneumococcal diseases.

Saha, along with his team, designed and set up four sentinel hospital surveillance networks in Bangladesh. The "community adjusted hospital-based surveillance" is a model of surveillance that records data of the burden of diseases at a population level. The surveillance data is generated on invasive childhood diseases caused by Streptococcus pneumoniae, Haemophilus influenzae, Salmonella typhi/paratyphi, etc.

Saha has published more than 150 papers in peer-reviewed journals, mostly exploring the topics of childhood pneumonia and meningitis.

== Public health organizations ==
A member of Pneumococcal Awareness Council of Experts (PACE), he also heads the steering committee of the Coalition Against Typhoid (CaT) of the Sabin Vaccine Institute. He is an associate of the Department of International Health of Johns Hopkins University, Maryland and adjunct scientist of International Centre for Diarrhoeal Disease Research, Bangladesh (ICDDR,B). He is also a member of the National Committee for Immunization Policies of the Government of Bangladesh.

== Honors and awards ==
Saha has been recognized by numerous awards, including:

- In 2017, American Society for Microbiology (ASM) Award for Research in Clinical Microbiology.
- In 2017, UNESCO Carlos J. Finlay Prize in Microbiology.
- in 2021, received Ekushey Padak from Bangladesh government.
