= Katherine O'Brien =

Canadian-born pediatric physician (born 1963)

Kate O'Brien
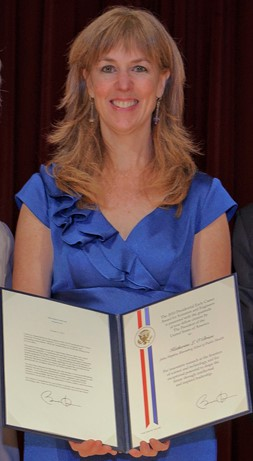
- O'Brien with the Presidential Early Career Award for Scientists and Engineers (PECASE) award for 2010
- Born: 1963 (age 62–63); Edmonton, Alberta, Canada
- Education: University of Toronto; McGill University; Johns Hopkins Bloomberg School of Public Health
- Occupations: Pediatric infectious disease physician Epidemiologist; Vaccinologist
- Years active: 1988-present
- Children: 2

Katherine "Kate" L. O'Brien (born 1963) is a Canadian American pediatric infectious disease physician, epidemiologist, and vaccinologist who specializes in the areas of pneumococcal epidemiology, pneumococcal vaccine trials and impact studies, and surveillance for pneumococcal disease. She is also known as an expert in infectious diseases (including pneumonia and diarrheal diseases) in American Indian populations. O'Brien is currently the Director of the World Health Organization's Department of Immunization, Vaccines and Biologicals.

== Early life and education ==
O'Brien was born in Edmonton, Alberta. She grew up in Ottawa, in the province of Ontario, and graduated from Lisgar Collegiate Institute in 1980.

In 1984, O'Brien earned a BSc in chemistry from the University of Toronto. In 1988, O'Brien received an MD from McGill University at the age of 25 years old. O'Brien came to the United States to do her residency in pediatrics at Johns Hopkins Hospital from 1988 to 1991. In 1994, O'Brien received an MPH from Johns Hopkins Bloomberg School of Public Health focused on International Public Health/International Health while also doing a two-year training program in pediatric infectious diseases.

== Career ==
In 1991, O'Brien worked for a year in Port-au-Prince, Haiti on a children's health project on HIV transmission. She said the experience was formative, and led her to view vaccines as being a social justice issue.

From 1995 to 1997, she worked at the Centers for Disease Control and Prevention (CDC) as an Epidemiologic Intelligence Officer in the Bacterial Respiratory Diseases Branch.

In 1996, as part of her job at the CDC, and given her previous experience in Haiti, O'Brien traveled to Haiti to investigate an outbreak of children who were dying. O'Brien and colleague Joel Selanikio (from the CDC) discovered the children had been exposed to liquid acetaminophen Afebril and Valodon manufactured by Pharval that was contaminated with almost 25% diethylene glycol (DEG), a poison. It was later discovered that there was contamination in the supply chain tracing back to a Chinese manufacturer.

In July 1998, O'Brien joined the faculty of Johns Hopkins Bloomberg School of Public Health, eventually becoming a Professor of International Health and Epidemiology and Executive Director of the International Vaccine Access Center at the Johns Hopkins Bloomberg School of Public Health. Her scientific and policy work domestically and globally has focused on vaccine preventable illnesses, among both children and adults. The work has included surveillance, epidemiology, and vaccine clinical trials of pneumococcal disease; rotavirus; Haemophilus influenzae type b; respiratory syncytial virus and influenza vaccines. She has worked extensively with American Indian populations and in Africa and south Asia, partnering with local scientists and country program staff to develop rigorous scientific evidence and bring it into the vaccine policy arena, thereby accelerating the use and access to life-saving vaccines for children living in low resource countries and settings. She left Johns Hopkins in December 2018.

In January 2019, O'Brien became the director of the Immunization, Vaccines and Biologicals Department at the World Health Organization (WHO). In this role, she is responsible for leading the overall work and strategy of the Department to advance the vision of reducing the health, social and economic burden of vaccine preventable diseases. The Director works across all levels of WHO (country, region and headquarters) in collaboration with partners to deliver country impact.

She has worked in close partnerships with GAVI, the Vaccine Alliance, university colleagues, NGOs, and with countries to advance programs and policies on child health.

== Personal life ==
O'Brien is married to an adult infectious disease physician who specializes in HIV/AIDs, who she met while working in Haiti. They have a daughter and a son.

== Leadership ==
- 2012-2018: WHO, Strategic Advisory Group of Experts on Immunization (SAGE)
- Global Alliance for Vaccines and Immunizations (GAVI), Board Member
- Johns Hopkins Bloomberg School of Public Health's Center for American Indian Health, Senior Advisor, Infectious Disease

== Awards ==
- 1997: Food and Drug Administration, Group Recognition Award for meritorious service in the investigation of an international public health crisis which was associated with the contamination of pharmaceuticals by diethylene glycol
- 1997: CDC, Group Honor Award for The Haiti Emergency Response Team
- 1997: CDC, Donald C. Mackel Memorial Award for "Epidemic of Deaths from Acute Renal Failure Among Children in Haiti"
- 1998: United States Department of Health and Human Services, Secretary's Distinguished Service Award
- 1999: CDC, James H. Nakano Citation for "Epidemic of Pediatric Deaths from Acute Renal Failure Caused by Diethylene Glycol Poisoning"
- 2001: CDC, Honor Award for outstanding scientific contributions to public health, Group B Streptococcal Prevention Team
- 2003: CDC, Outstanding Scientific Contribution to Public Health Award (nominee)
- 2008: Sabin Vaccine Institute, Young Investigator Award
- 2011: National Institutes of Health, President's Early Career Award in Science and Engineering (PECASE)
- 2013: Robert Austrian Award and Lectureship
- 2014: International Symposium on Pneumococci and Pneumococcal Diseases (ISPPD-9), Robert Austrian Lecturer
- 2015: Maryland Women's Hall of Fame

== Selected works and publications ==
- O'Brien, KL; Selanikio, JD; Hecdivert, C; Placide, MF; Louis, M; Barr, DB; Barr, JR; Hospedales, CJ; Lewis, MJ; Schwartz, B; Philen, RM; St Victor, S; Espindola, J; Needham, LL; Denerville, K (15 April 1998). "Epidemic of pediatric deaths from acute renal failure caused by diethylene glycol poisoning. Acute Renal Failure Investigation Team". JAMA. 279 (15): 1175–80. doi:10.1001/JAMA.279.15.1175. PMID 9555756. Wikidata ()
- Vesikari, Timo; Matson, David O.; Dennehy, Penelope; Van Damme, Pierre; Santosham, Mathuram; Rodriguez, Zoe; Dallas, Michael J.; Heyse, Joseph F.; Goveia, Michelle G.; Black, Steven B.; Shinefield, Henry R.; Christie, Celia D.C.; Ylitalo, Samuli; Itzler, Robbin F.; Coia, Michele L.; Onorato, Matthew T.; Adeyi, Ben A.; Marshall, Gary S.; Gothefors, Leif; Campens, Dirk; Karvonen, Aino; Watt, James P.; O'Brien, Katherine L.; DiNubile, Mark J.; Clark, H Fred; Boslego, John W.; Offit, Paul A.; Heaton, Penny M. (5 January 2006). "Safety and Efficacy of a Pentavalent Human–Bovine (WC3) Reassortant Rotavirus Vaccine". New England Journal of Medicine. 354 (1): 23–33. doi:10.1056/NEJMOA052664. PMID 16394299. Wikidata ()
- O'Brien, Katherine L; Wolfson, Lara J; Watt, James P; Henkle, Emily; Deloria-Knoll, Maria; McCall, Natalie; Lee, Ellen; Mulholland, Kim; Levine, Orin S; Cherian, Thomas (September 2009). "Burden of disease caused by Streptococcus pneumoniae in children younger than 5 years: global estimates". The Lancet. 374 (9693): 893–902. doi:10.1016/S0140-6736(09)61204-6. PMID 19748398. Wikidata ()
- Nair, Harish; Nokes, D James; Gessner, Bradford D; Dherani, Mukesh; Madhi, Shabir A; Singleton, Rosalyn J; O'Brien, Katherine L; Roca, Anna; Wright, Peter F; Bruce, Nigel; Chandran, Aruna; Theodoratou, Evropi; Sutanto, Agustinus; Sedyaningsih, Endang R; Ngama, Mwanajuma; Munywoki, Patrick K; Kartasasmita, Cissy; Simões, Eric AF; Rudan, Igor; Weber, Martin W; Campbell, Harry (May 2010). "Global burden of acute lower respiratory infections due to respiratory syncytial virus in young children: a systematic review and meta-analysis". The Lancet. 375 (9725): 1545–1555. doi:10.1016/S0140-6736(10)60206-1. PMC 2864404. PMID 20399493. Wikidata ()
- Johnson, Hope L.; Deloria-Knoll, Maria; Levine, Orin S.; Stoszek, Sonia K.; Freimanis Hance, Laura; Reithinger, Richard; Muenz, Larry R.; O'Brien, Katherine L.; Cohen, Jonathan (5 October 2010). "Systematic Evaluation of Serotypes Causing Invasive Pneumococcal Disease among Children Under Five: The Pneumococcal Global Serotype Project". PLOS Medicine. 7 (10) e1000348. doi:10.1371/JOURNAL.PMED.1000348. PMC 2950132. PMID 20957191. Wikidata ()
- Walker, Christa L Fischer; Rudan, Igor; Liu, Li; Nair, Harish; Theodoratou, Evropi; Bhutta, Zulfiqar A; O'Brien, Katherine L; Campbell, Harry; Black, Robert E (April 2013). "Global burden of childhood pneumonia and diarrhoea". The Lancet. 381 (9875): 1405–1416. doi:10.1016/S0140-6736(13)60222-6. PMC 7159282. PMID 23582727. Wikidata ()
- Gessner, Bradford D.; Kaslow, David; Louis, Jacques; Neuzil, Kathleen; O'Brien, Katherine L.; Picot, Valentina; Pang, Tikki; Parashar, Umesh D.; Saadatian-Elahi, Mitra; Nelson, Christopher B. (November 2017). "Estimating the full public health value of vaccination". Vaccine. 35 (46): 6255–6263. doi:10.1016/J.VACCINE.2017.09.048. PMC 11369760. PMID 28986035. Wikidata ()
- Piralam, Barameht; Prosperi, Christine; Thamthitiwat, Somsak; Bunthi, Charatdao; Sawatwong, Pongpun; Sangwichian, Ornuma; Higdon, Melissa M.; Watson, Nora L.; Deloria Knoll, Maria; Paveenkittiporn, Wantana; Chara, Chuwattana; Hurst, Cameron P.; Akarasewi, Pasakorn; Rhodes, Julia; Maloney, Susan A.; O'Brien, Katherine L.; Baggett, Henry C.; Melo-Cristino, Jose (29 April 2020). "Pneumococcal colonization prevalence and density among Thai children with severe pneumonia and community controls". PLOS ONE. 15 (4) e0232151. Bibcode:2020PLoSO..1532151P. doi:10.1371/JOURNAL.PONE.0232151. PMC 7190126. PMID 32348330. Wikidata ()
