= World Pneumonia Day =

Annual event

World Pneumonia Day (12 November) provides an annual forum for the world in the fight against pneumonia. More than 100 organizations representing the interests of children joined forces as the Global Coalition against Child Pneumonia to hold the first World Pneumonia Day on 12 November 2009. Save The Children artist ambassadors Gwyneth Paltrow and Hugh Laurie, Charles MacCormack of Save The Children, Orin Levine of PneumoADIP, Lance Laifer of Hedge Funds vs. Malaria & Pneumonia, the Global Health Council, the GAVI Alliance, and the Sabin Vaccine Institute joined together in a call to action asking people to participate in World Pneumonia Day on 2 November.

Pneumonia is a preventable and treatable disease that sickens 155 million children under 5 and kills 1.6 million each year. This makes pneumonia the number 1 killer of children under 5, claiming more lives in this age group than AIDS, malaria, and measles combined. Despite the overwhelming death toll of pneumonia, it rarely receives coverage in the news media. World Pneumonia Day aims to help bring this health crisis to the public’s attention and encourages policy makers and grassroots organizers alike to combat the disease.

Affordable treatment and prevention options exist against pneumonia. There are effective vaccines against the two most common bacterial causes of deadly pneumonia, Haemophilus influenzae type B and Streptococcus pneumoniae, and most common viral cause of pneumonia, Orthomyxoviridae. A course of antibiotics which costs less than $1(US) is capable of curing the disease if it is started early enough. The Global Action Plan for the Prevention and Control of Pneumonia (GAPP) released by the WHO and UNICEF on World Pneumonia Day, 2009, finds that 1 million children's lives could be saved every year if prevention and treatment interventions for pneumonia were widely introduced in the world's poorest countries.

The United Nations Millennium Development Goals (MDGs) are eight international development goals that 192 United Nations member states and at least 23 international organizations have agreed to achieve by the year 2015. The fourth of these goals is to reduce by two-thirds, between 1990 and 2015, the under-five mortality rate.
