= John Salamone =

American public policy advisor and vaccine safety advocate

John B. Salamone
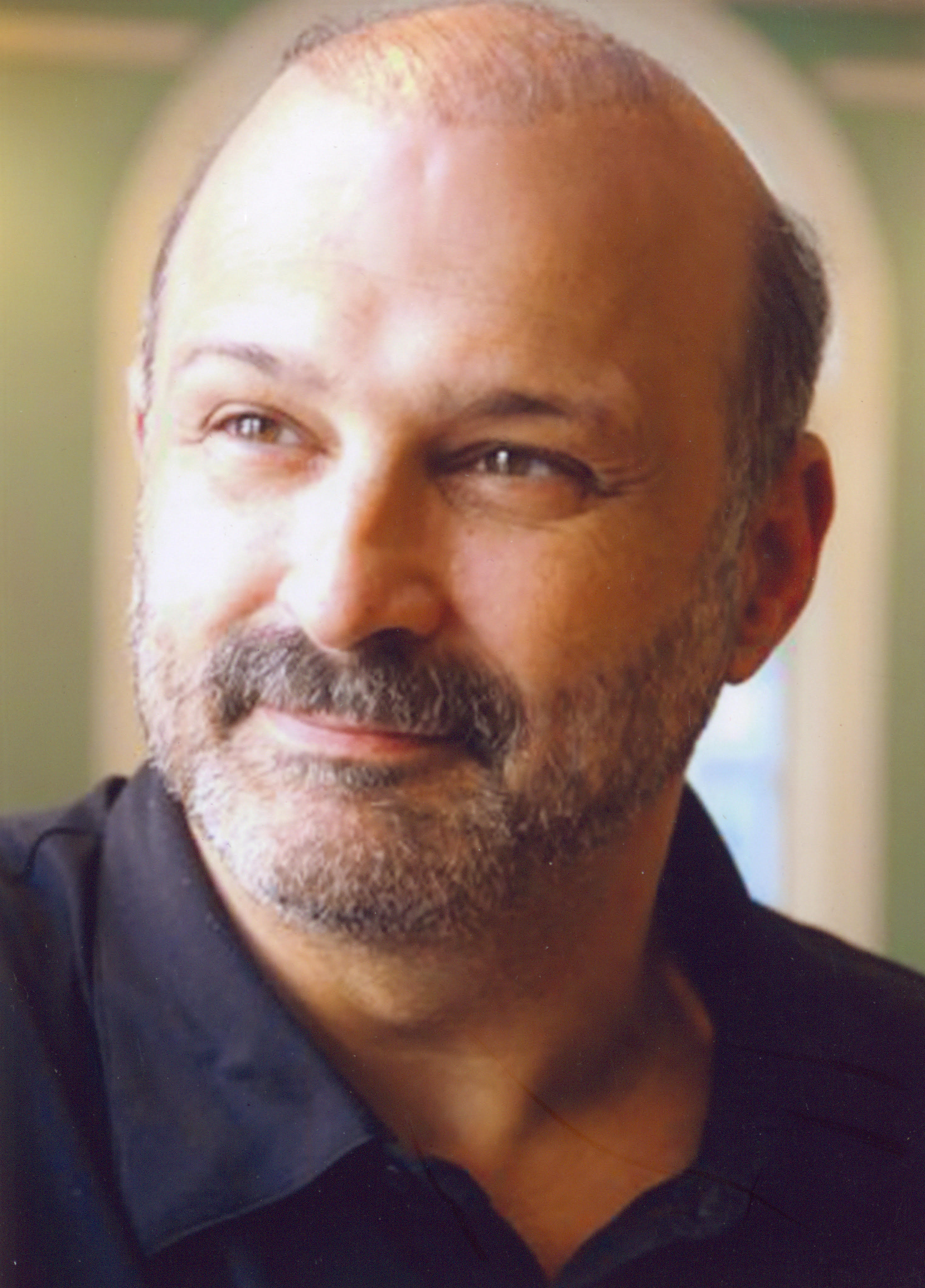
- Education: University of Maryland
- Occupations: Public policy advisor & Vaccine safety advocate

John B. Salamone is an American public policy advisor, vaccine safety advocate and fundraiser for charitable organizations.

He is best known for his leadership at the National Italian American Foundation (NIAF), his advocacy for safer vaccination policies in the United States and his efforts to raise funds for non-profit organizations.

== Early life and career ==
Salamone holds a Bachelor of Science degree in Journalism and Government from the University of Maryland. Salamone began his career in Washington, D.C. in 1970 as a special assistant in the US Congress. After a decade, he joined the U.S. Department of Justice during the Reagan Administration, serving as Congressional Liaison at the United States Immigration and Naturalization Service (INS), where he worked on immigration policy with the White House, Congress, and the business community.

== National Italian American Foundation ==
In 1984, Salamone moved to the National Italian American Foundation (NIAF), a nonprofit organization providing education and scholarship programs as well as promoting Italian American heritage and U.S.–Italy relations. Under his leadership, NIAF's revenues doubled in his first year, and he transformed the Foundation’s Washington Gala into one of the nation’s most successful annual events, raising millions annually for scholarships and cultural programs. He also expanded the Foundation’s endowment through direct mail campaigns, major gifts, and product endorsements. He retired from NIAF as Executive Director in 2008.

In 2008, Salamone was awarded the Commendatore Ordine al Merito della Repubblica Italiana, Italy’s highest civilian honor, presented by Ambassador Giovanni Castellaneta.

== Vaccine safety advocacy ==
Salamone became a vaccine safety advocate after his son, David, contracted vaccine-associated paralytic polio (VAPP) from the oral polio vaccine (OPV) in 1990. His advocacy contributed to the Centers for Disease Control and Prevention (CDC) replacing OPV with the inactivated polio vaccine (IPV) in 2000, reducing VAPP cases in the United States. David Salamone died in 2018 and in 2020 the CDC dedicated an exhibition to the efforts he and his father made to promote safer vaccines.

Salamone co-founded the advocacy group Informed Parents Against Vaccine-Associated Paralytic Polio, later known as the Vaccine Associated Polio Society (VAPS). His efforts are also chronicled in Paul Offit’s book Deadly Choices: How the Anti-Vaccine Movement Threatens Us All as well as in the film “Jabbed: Love, Fear and Vaccines”.

== Federal appointments and honors ==
In 2005, President George W. Bush appointed Salamone to the Board of Trustees of the Christopher Columbus Fellowship Foundation. He was also appointed by the Secretary of Health and Human Services (HHS) as the first laymen to serve on the Advisory Committee on Immunization Practices (ACIP), the CDC committee that provides guidance and recommendations for US vaccine policy.

He has received several honors, including the Ellis Island Medal of Honor. In 2007, he was invested as a Knight within the Order of St. John.

== Salamone Associates LLC ==
In 2008, Salamone founded Salamone Associates LLC, a consulting firm specializing in nonprofit fundraising and strategic development. The firm leverages Salamone’s relationships with Fortune 500 CEOs, political leaders, and entertainment figures to support philanthropic efforts.

== Charitable work ==
Salamone has been involved in a range of charitable initiatives in the United States and internationally including organizations such as the Larry King Cardiac Foundation, the Andrea Bocelli Foundation, Operation Backbone, the Tyler Robinson Foundation, and the United Nations High Commissioner for Refugees (UNHCR), where he collaborated with Sophia Loren in her role as Goodwill Ambassador. He has also supported the Barbara Sinatra Children’s Center, and the Sabin Vaccine Institute. Salamone’s philanthropic involvement has brought him into contact with every U.S. presidents over the past 50 years, as well as public figures from the entertainment and business sectors.
