= Senjuti Saha =

Bangladeshi scientist

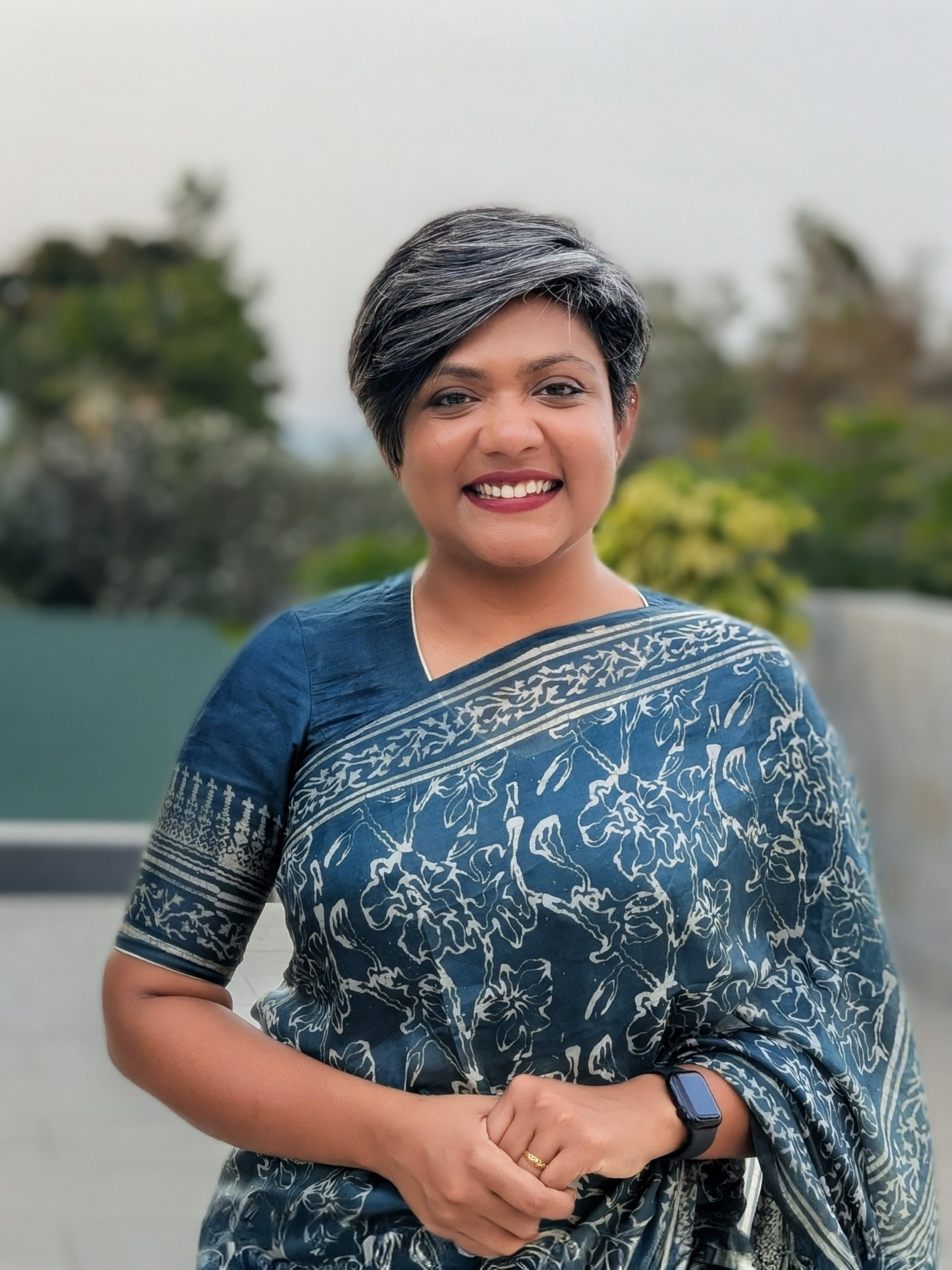
- Saha in 2026
- Born: Dhaka, Bangladesh
- Education: University of Toronto
- Known for: Genome sequencing of SARS-CoV2 in Bangladesh
- Awards: Full list
- Scientific career
- Fields: Molecular genetics, microbiology, epidemiology
- Workplaces: Child Health Research Foundation (CHRF)

Senjuti Saha is a Bangladeshi scientist, serving as the Deputy Executive Director at the Child Health Research Foundation (CHRF). Her research focuses on infectious diseases, genomic epidemiology, antimicrobial resistance, and public health in low-resource settings. Currently, she directs multiple comprehensive studies, including projects on respiratory syncytial virus (RSV) infections, single-cell genomics, neonatal sepsis, and genomics for tackling antimicrobial resistance. Her research not only addresses the needs of low-resource settings but also informs global health strategies. Dr. Saha also founded and leads Building Scientists for Bangladesh, a country-wide initiative that reflects her commitment to building scientific capacity and promoting trust in science.

== Biography and education ==
Saha was raised in Dhaka, Bangladesh. Her father, Dr. Samir Kumar Saha, is a microbiologist, and her mother, Dr. Setarunnahar Setara, is a public health researcher. Senjuti Saha finished high school in Bangladesh. After her A-Levels, she completed her Bachelor of Science degree in biochemistry at the University of Toronto. She then received her PhD from the same institute.

== Career ==
Senjuti Saha started her career as a postdoctoral research fellow at The Hospital for Sick Children, Canada and Stanford University, USA. She was also appointed as a postdoctoral researcher at the Child Health Research Foundation (CHRF) in Bangladesh. In 2019, she joined CHRF as a scientist. Currently, she is serving as the Deputy Executive Director at CHRF.

== Research contributions ==
Saha returned to Bangladesh to work on the frontlines of public health and establish a state-of-the-art genomics centre. Her groundbreaking work has advanced genomic epidemiology and antimicrobial resistance (AMR) research, with notable contributions to understanding resistance patterns in typhoid, paratyphoid, and Klebsiella infections.

In 2020, Senjuti Saha and her team decoded the genome sequence of SARS-CoV2 in Bangladesh. Prior to that, she had performed an unbiased metagenomic sequence analysis to show a correlation between pediatric meningitis and Chikungunya virus outbreak in Bangladesh.

Her studies generated critical evidence that facilitated the introduction of the typhoid conjugate vaccine (TCV) in Bangladesh in 2025.

== Publications ==
- Health-care burden related to respiratory syncytial virus in a resource-constrained setting: a prospective observational study
- Overcoming colonialism in pathogen genomics
- Epidemiology of Typhoid and Paratyphoid: Implications for Vaccine Policy
- Old tools, new applications: Use of environmental bacteriophages for typhoid surveillance and evaluating vaccine impact
- Cohort Profile: Health and Demographic Surveillance System in Mirzapur, Tangail, Bangladesh
- Estimating typhoid incidence from community-based serosurveys: a multicohort study
- F-Type Pyocins Are Diverse Noncontractile Phage Tail-Like Weapons for Killing Pseudomonas aeruginosa

Full Publication list

== Awards ==
- 2026: Rising Star Award - Sabin Vaccine Institute
- 2023: Bangamata Begum Fazilatun Nesa Mujib Award.Bangladesh's highest civilian award for women
- 2023: Asian Scientist 100, Asian Scientist
- 2022: Highlighted by The Lancet as one of the top 10 researchers worldwide
- 2019: Recognized by the Gates Foundation as a "Gate's Hero in the Field"
