= Shahida Hasnain =

Professor

Shahida Hasnain is a professor at the University of the Punjab, specializing in botany and genetics.

== Biography ==
Hasnain earned her Master of Science degree in botany from the University of the Punjab in 1974, then completed her Ph.D. in genetics at the University of Birmingham, from 1982 to 1985. She furthered her research in molecular genetics at the same university from 1994 to 1995, supported by a Mary Curie Fellowship from the European Commission.

In October 2017, Shahida Hasnain, along with Samir Kumar Saha from Bangladesh, received the UNESCO Carlos J. Finlay Prize for Microbiology.
