= Khatijah Yusoff =

Malaysian virologist

Yang Berbahagia Datin Paduka Khatijah Yusoff DSIS, FASc, FIAS, FTWAS, PhD

Dean of the Faculty of Veterinary Medicine Universiti Putra Malaysia
- Incumbent
- Assumed office 1 January 2016
- Chancellor: Sharafuddin of Selangor

Personal details
- Born: 15 June 1956 (age 70) Penang
- Citizenship: Malaysia
- Education: La Trobe University (BSc); La Trobe University (PhD)

Khatijah Mohamad Yusoff is a Malaysian academic and a virologist. Her research on the Virulent Newcastle disease (NDV), a poultry virus has gained acknowledgement locally and globally. She received the UNESCO Carlos J. Finlay Prize for Microbiology in 2005.

== Personal ==
Khatijah was born in Penang.
