= Dilfuza Egamberdieva =

Uzbekistan female microbiologist

Dilfuza Egamberdieva is an Uzbekistan microbiologist specializing in agriculture. She is the CEO and founder of Ecobiome R&D Ltd. and serves as the head of the Biological Research and Food Safety Lab. Egamberdieva is notable for receiving the UNESCO-Carlos J. Finlay Prize for Microbiology, recognizing her significant contributions to the field. Her work focuses on developing microbial solutions to enhance soil and plant health in challenging environmental conditions, such as soil salinity.

== Early life ==
Egamberdieva was born in Uzbekistan and raised with four other siblings by her parents. Her family were large supporters of her education in science as she emphasized her country's prevailing belief for women to prioritize family over career and work.

== Education ==
She completed her undergraduate studies in biology at the National University of Uzbekistan (1988–1993), followed by earning her PhD in Agricultural Sciences from Humboldt University in Berlin, Germany (1998–2000). She pursued postdoctoral research at various institutions including Helsinki University in Finland, the University of Florence in Italy, Manchester Metropolitan University in the UK, Leiden University in the Netherlands, and the Centre of Agricultural Landscape Research in Germany.

== Career ==
In 2007, Egamberdieva established Ecobiome R&D, a research lab in Uzbekistan. She also founded the Central Asian Chapter of The Organization for Women in Science for the Developing World (OWSD) in Uzbekistan and served as its chair. Additionally, she was elected as a team member in a working group on the internationalization of German research within the German Council of Science and Humanities (WR). In 2018, Egamberdieva was appointed to both the High-Level Panel of Experts on Food Security and Nutrition (HLPE) and the UN Committee on World Food Security (CFS) for the term spanning from 2018 to 2022. She holds the role of National Focal Point Representative for UNESCO-SEPAN (Science and Technology Policy Asian Network) and serves as a board committee member from 2021 to 2023. Egamberdieva is designated as the ambassador of the American Society for Microbiology in Uzbekistan and serves on editorial boards, including Elsevier. Her scholarly contributions include co-authoring 200 publications in peer-reviewed journals and authoring 6 books.

== Research ==
Egamberdieva's research primarily revolves around the soil microbiome, demonstrating the potential of microbes to act as stimulators and control agents, offering an alternative approach to conventional agrochemicals in hostile environments. Her work also extends to investigating plant stress tolerance, soil biology, and microbial diversity. The overarching goal of her research is to provide safer alternatives to chemical pesticides and fertilizers in agriculture. Egamberdieva's efforts involve identifying and harnessing various beneficial microbes to enhance a plant's ability to adapt to its environment, analogous to the concept of immunization in humans, thereby promoting resilience to diseases and environmental stresses.

== Notable Awards ==
- Egamberdieva won UNESCO J. Finlay Prize for Microbiology in 11-14-2023.
- The World Academy of Science Award in Agricultural Sciences (2012)
- TWAS-TWOWS-SCOPUS Young Women Research Award (2009)
