= Ciro de Quadros =

Brazilian physician

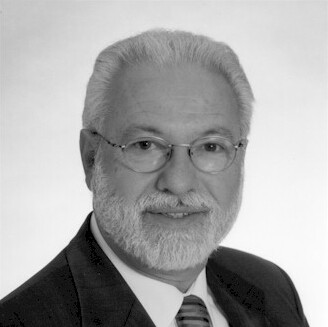
Ciro de Quadros

Ciro Carlos Araujo de Quadros (January 30, 1940 – May 28, 2014) was a Brazilian leader in the field of Public Health, in particular, the area of vaccines and preventable diseases. He was born in Rio Pardo, Brazil.

== Eradication of polio ==
De Quadros played a critical role in developing the strategies now used worldwide in the eradication of polio. He led the team which eradicated polio from the Americas. He received a Medical Doctor degree from the Federal University for Health Sciences (UFCSPA), Porto Alegre, Brazil, 1966, and a M.P.H. degree from the National School of Public Health, Rio de Janeiro, Brazil, 1968.

== Later work ==
In 2003, de Quadros joined the Sabin Vaccine Institute, a non-profit organization honoring the legacy of Albert Sabin, developer of the oral polio vaccine. De Quadros was instrumental in the Institute's international immunization advocacy programs, where he worked on issues such as the introduction of new vaccines, e.g. rotavirus, rubella, human papilloma virus, pneumococcal and others, and on issues related to the sustainability of national immunization programs. He was also on the faculty at Johns Hopkins School of Hygiene and Public Health and the School of Medicine of the George Washington University.

== Death ==
He died of pancreatic cancer on May 28, 2014 at his home in Washington, D.C.

== Public Health Awards ==
He published and presented at conferences throughout the world and received a number of international awards, including:

- the 1993 Prince Mahidol Award of Thailand
- the 2000 Albert B. Sabin Gold Medal
- The Order of Rio Branco from his native Brazil
- election to the National Institute of Medicine
- 2011 BBVA Foundation Frontiers of Knowledge Award of Development Cooperation for leading efforts to eliminate polio and measles from the western hemisphere and being one of the most important scientists in the eradication of smallpox around the world. His work has shown that vaccination programs can be carried out in an economically sustainable way.
- Public Health Hero of the Americas award from the Pan-American Health Organization (2014)
- Geneva Forum for Health Award (2014)
- Featured in PAHO's Art for Research exhibit collection by photographer Theo Chalmers "Shaping the World", highlighting how research for health drives social and economic development. The collection Shaping the World that has been exhibited in Africa, Europe and throughout the Americas.

== See also ==
- Sabin Vaccine Institute
