= Antonio Peña Díaz =

Mexican biochemist (born 1936)

- Born: 1936 (age 89–90); Durango, Mexico
- Education: National Autonomous University of Mexico
- Awards: Carlos J. Finlay Prize for Microbiology (UNESCO, 2003).
- Scientific career
- Fields: Biochemistry
- Workplaces: Institute for Cellular Physiology, National Autonomous University of Mexico (UNAM)

Antonio Peña Díaz (born in 1936) is a Mexican biochemist who received the Carlos J. Finlay Prize for Microbiology (UNESCO, 2003) and chaired both the Mexican Academy of Sciences (1992–93) and the Mexican Society of Biochemistry (1981–83).

Peña Díaz holds a bachelor's degree in Medicine and both a master's and a doctorate degree from the National Autonomous University of Mexico (UNAM). He is currently an emeritus professor of the Institute for Cellular Physiology of the same university and has worked as a visiting scholar at the University of Rochester.

== Selected works ==
- Bioquímica ("Biochemistry", 1979)
- Las membranas de las células ("The Membranes of the Cell", 1986)
- La energía y la vida: bioenergética ("Energy and Life: Bioenergetics", with Georges Dreyfus Cortés, 1990)
- Cómo funciona una célula: fisiología celular ("How Does a Cell Work: Cellular Physiology", 1995)
- ¿Qué es el metabolismo? ("What is Metabolism?", 2001)
