= Jean-Marie Ghuysen =

Belgian university teacher (1925–2004)

Jean-Marie Ghuysen (1925-2004), was a Belgian academic.

== Biography ==
Ghuysen was born on 26 January 1925 in Trembleur. His early life in Blégny-Trembleur, near Liège, revolved around his father's pharmacy, providing initial scientific exposure. Despite German occupation during his university years, he clandestinely obtained degrees in pharmacy and chemistry, subsequently gaining a PhD for his research on RNA in 1951.

Ghuysen's career progressed at Labaz Laboratories, where he led research on bacteriolytic enzymes, advancing knowledge of bacterial cell wall structure. This work earned him an Agregation Degree in Pharmaceutical Sciences in 1957, the highest academic honor in Belgium.

Returning to the University of Liège, he focused on peptidoglycan research and proposed the term itself in 1966. His subsequent work explored penicillin's interaction with peptidoglycan biosynthesis, providing insights into bacterial antibiotic resistance.

== Awards and recognition ==
Ghuysen received multiple awards, including the Prix Joseph Maisin of the National Research Foundation of Belgium (FNRS), the Gairdner Foundation International Award in Medical Science, and the UNESCO Carlos J. Finlay Prize for Microbiology.
