= Jim Lynch (academic) =

Professor of life sciences

Jim Lynch OBE

Academic background
- Education: King's College London

Academic work
- Discipline: Rhizosphere Biology
- Institutions: University of Surrey
- Main interests: Sustainable Agriculture; Forestry

Jim Lynch, or James Michael Lynch, is an Emeritus Distinguished professor of life sciences at the University of Surrey. He is author of more than 250 publications with over 12,000 citations. In 1993, he was awarded the Carlos J. Finlay Prize for Microbiology.

== Education ==
Lynch has a Bachelor in Industrial Chemistry from the Loughborough University and was awarded a PhD and a DSc from King's College London.
