= Etienne Pays =

Belgian molecular biologist

Etienne Pays (born 2 November 1948) is a Belgian molecular biologist and professor at the Universite Libre de Bruxelles. His research interest is on trypanosomes.

He obtained a PhD in zoology from the Universite Libre de Bruxelles (ULB) in 1974, and an Aggregation for Higher Education in 1984. Since January 1998, he is professor at the ULB and since October 1992, director of the Laboratory of Molecular Parasitology. From 1993 until 1996, he was president of the Belgian Society of Protozoology.

In 1996, he was awarded the Francqui Prize on Biological and Medical Sciences for his work on molecular biology. In 1997, he was awarded the Carlos J. Finlay Prize for Microbiology (UNESCO, Paris). In 2000, he was awarded the Quinquennal Prize for fundamental biomedical sciences (FNRS).
