= Carlos J. Finlay Prize for Microbiology =

Carlos J. Finlay Prize
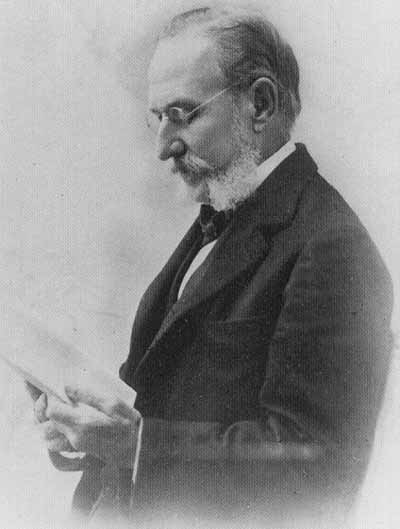
- Carlos J. Finlay
- Awarded for: "an outstanding contribution to microbiology (including immunology, molecular biology, genetics, etc.) and its applications."
- Presented by: United Nations Educational, Scientific and Cultural Organization (UNESCO) and the Government of Cuba.
- First award: 1980

The Carlos J. Finlay Prize is a biennial scientific prize sponsored by the Government of Cuba and awarded since 1980 by the United Nations Educational, Scientific and Cultural Organization (UNESCO) to people or organizations for their outstanding contributions to microbiology (including immunology, molecular biology, genetics, etc.) and its applications. Winners receive a grant of $5,000 USD donated by the Government of Cuba and an Albert Einstein Silver Medal from UNESCO.

The Prize is awarded in odd years (to coincide with UNESCO's General Conference) and is named after Carlos Juan Finlay (1833 – 1915), a Cuban physician and microbiologist widely known for his pioneering discoveries in the field of yellow fever.

== Winners ==
Source: UNESCO

- 1980 - Roger Y. Stanier (Canada)
- 1983 - César Milstein, FRS (Argentina, United Kingdom)
- 1985 - Victor Nussenzweig and Ruth Nussenzweig (Brazil)
- 1987 - Hélio Gelli Pereira (Brazil) and Peter Reichard (Sweden)
- 1989 - Georges Cohen (France) and Walter Fiers (Belgium)
- 1991 - Margarita Salas and Eladio Viñuela (Spain) and Jean-Marie Ghuysen (Belgium)
- 1993 - James Michael Lynch (UK), James Tiedje (USA), Johannes Antonie Van Veen (Netherlands)
- 1995 - Jan Balzarini (Belgium) and Pascale Cossart (France)
- 1996 - Etienne Pays (Belgium) and Sheikh Riazzudin (Pakistan)
- 1999 - Ádám Kondorosi (Hungary)
- 2001 - Susana López Charreton and Carlos Arias Ortiz (Mexico)
- 2003 - Antonio Peña Díaz (Mexico)
- 2005 - Khatijah Yusoff (Malaysia)
- 2015 - Yoshihiro Kawaoka (Japan)
- 2017 - Samir Kumar Saha (Bangladesh) and Shahida Hasnain (Pakistan)
- 2020 - Kenya Honda (Japan)
- 2023 - Dilfuza Egamberdieva (Uzbekistan)
- 2026 - Direk Limmathurotsakul (Thailand)

== See also ==
- List of biology awards
