= Orin Levine =

American epidemiologist

- Born: Richmond, Virginia
- Occupation: Epidemiologist
- Known for: Pneumococcal vaccine research

Academic background
- Education: BA, Gettysburg College; PhD, Johns Hopkins Bloomberg School of Public Health

Orin Levine is an American epidemiologist known for his work in the fields of international public health, child survival, and pneumonia. He is currently the director of vaccine delivery at the Bill & Melinda Gates Foundation in Seattle, Washington, United States. In the past he was the executive director of the International Vaccine Access Center (IVAC), the co-chair of the Pneumococcal Awareness Council of Experts (PACE), and is a professor at The Johns Hopkins Bloomberg School of Public Health in the Department of International Health. He is also an adjunct assistant professor of epidemiology at The Rollins School of Public Health at Emory University in Atlanta. Additionally, he is currently president of the American Society of Tropical Medicine and Hygiene (ASTMH) Council on Global Health. He resides in Washington, D.C.

== Early life and education ==
Orin Levine was born in Richmond, Virginia. He graduated with a bachelor's degree from Gettysburg College in Gettysburg, Pennsylvania. He continued his studies at The Johns Hopkins Bloomberg School of Public Health in Baltimore, Maryland, where he received a PhD in epidemiology.

== Research ==
After receiving his PhD, Levine spent 5 years working for The Centers for Disease Control and Prevention (CDC) in Atlanta. There, he served first as an Epidemic Intelligence Service officer, and then as a staff epidemiologist in the Respiratory Diseases Branch. He later worked at the National Institutes of Health in Bethesda, Maryland. In 2003, he joined the Department of International Health at the Johns Hopkins Bloomberg School of Public Health, and started the PneumoADIP, an organization dedicated to accelerating access to pneumococcal vaccines for impoverished children, with Katherine O'Brien. In the past 6 years, Levine and the PneumoADIP team have been awarded over $100 million in research grants from the GAVI Alliance and The Bill & Melinda Gates Foundation. He's now at the Gates Foundation in Seattle.

Levine is the executive director of the International Vaccine Access Center (IVAC), and a steering committee member of Johns Hopkins Vaccine Initiative (JHVI), at the Johns Hopkins Bloomberg School of Public Health, and president of the American Society of Tropical Medicine & Hygiene's Committee on Global Health. He is also a steering committee member of the Decade of Vaccines Collaboration, and the co-chair of the Decade of Vaccines Collaboration's Global Access Working Group.

Levine has authored over 100 peer-reviewed publications and book chapters. He also writes a regular blog for the Huffington Post on global health and vaccine-related issues, and appears regularly on radio, television, and in print as an expert authority on these topics.

Levine's research has predominantly been focused on the two most common causes of fatal pneumonia, S. pneumoniae and H. influenzae type b. His work on pneumonia research and prevention has been profiled in the New York Times.

He is also a part of the Accelerated Vaccine Introduction (AVI) Project, which is funded by the GAVI Alliance. The purpose of AVI is to accelerate access to life-saving pneumococcal and rotavirus vaccines for children in the world's poorest countries. Levine is also involved in dengue vaccines, acting as the lead at Johns Hopkins in the institution's involvement in the Dengue Vaccine Initiative, a consortium created to accelerate development and subsequent use of dengue vaccines.

Levine currently works on Pneumonia Etiology Research for Child Health (PERCH), which studies the causes of pneumonia and is funded by a $43 million grant from the Bill and Melinda Gates Foundation Pneumonia is the leading infectious disease cause of death among children worldwide. Existing knowledge on the etiologies of childhood pneumonia is largely based on studies conducted in the 1980s and 1990s. With expanded use of new pneumonia vaccines and changes in host and environmental factors, a new evidence base that harnesses novel diagnostic technologies is needed.

== Media appearances ==
In addition to his academic publishing, Levine appears frequently as an expert in print, on the radio, and on television. He has authored and/or co-authored Op-Eds that have appeared in publications around the world. His television appearances include two BBC World documentaries on pneumococcal disease and prevention by vaccination, and news interviews on BBC World, BBC News, Al-Jazeera (The Pulse), South African Broadcasting Corporation, and Arirang (South Korea). On August 4, 2009, Levine was featured in an episode of the "Kill or Cure" series on BBC World. This episode, called "Saving Lives", focused on efforts to increase access to pneumococcal vaccines through an initiative called the Advance Market Commitment. Most recently Levine was featured in the Johns Hopkins Bloomberg School of Public Health magazine for his work on advancing vaccine access.

== Awards ==
- In 2000, Levine was awarded the CDC's Iain Hardy award for his outstanding contribution to the control of vaccine-preventable diseases.
- In 2008, in light of his outstanding achievements in pneumococcal disease and its prevention, the National Foundation for Infectious Diseases selected Levine as the first Dr. Robert Austrian Memorial Lecturer at the National Vaccine Research Conference. The lecture is named for Dr. Robert Austrian, former chair of medical research at the University of Pennsylvania, who developed the first multivalent vaccine against pneumococcus bacteria. Austrian died in March 2007 at the age of 90.
