= Susana López Charretón =

Mexican virologist specialized in rotaviri (born 1957)

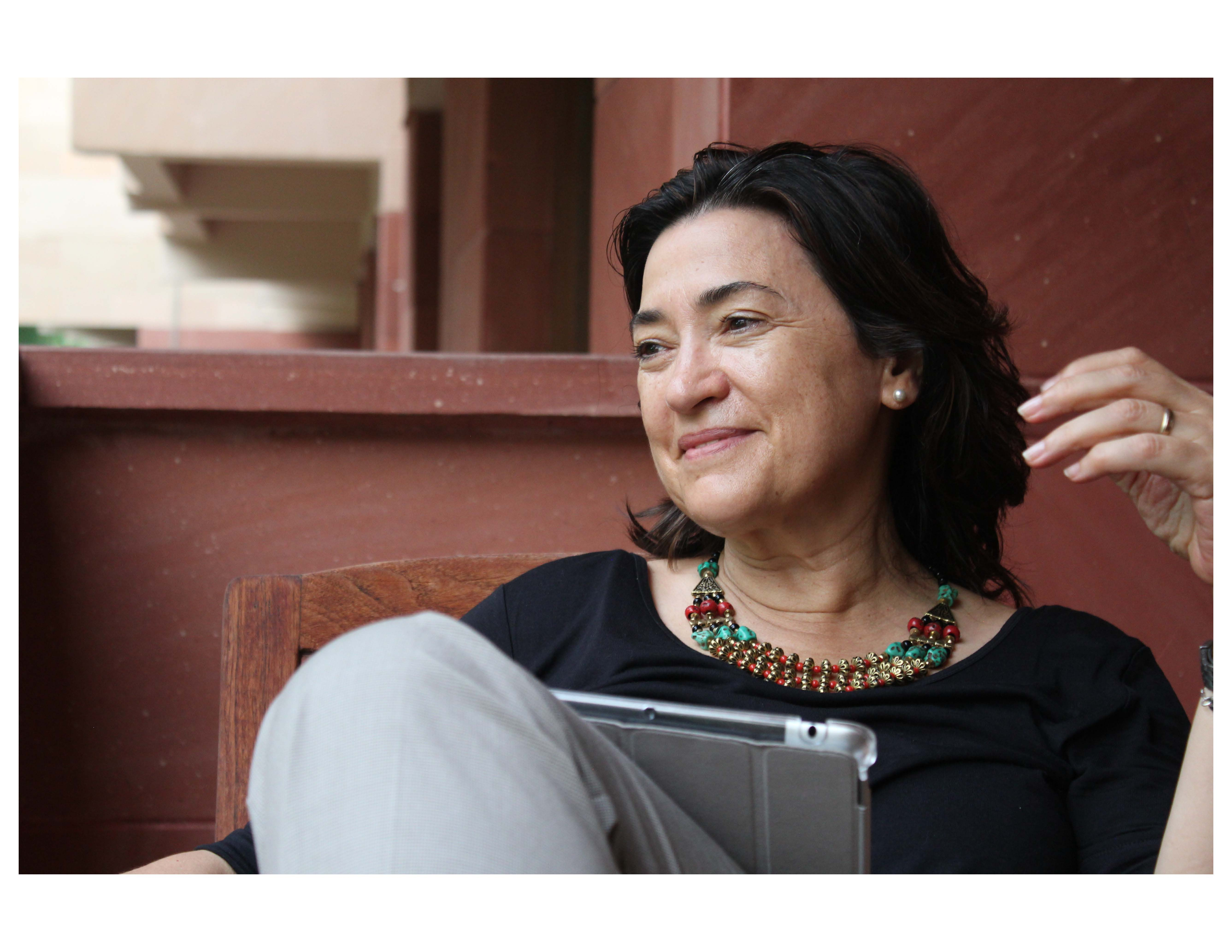
- Susana Lopez Charreton
- Born: 19 June 1957 (age 69); Mexico City, Mexico
- Education: National Autonomous University of Mexico
- Awards: Carlos J. Finlay Prize for Microbiology (UNESCO, 2001), TWAS Prize (Biology, 2008) and L'Oréal-UNESCO Award for Women in Science (Latin America, 2012).
- Scientific career
- Fields: Virology
- Workplaces: National Autonomous University of Mexico (UNAM)

Susana López Charretón (born 19 June 1957) is a Mexican virologist specialized in understanding the mechanisms of infection of rotavirus. López Charretón has led a research program as principal investigator at the Biotechnology Institute (UNAM) in Cuernavaca, Mexico for over 25 years.

From 2000 to 2010, she was a Howard Hughes Medical Institute International Research Scholar.

In 2012, López Charretón received the L'Oréal-UNESCO Award for Women in Science – Latin America "for identifying how rotaviruses cause the death of 600,000 children each year".

== Early life and education ==
Susana López Charretón was born in Mexico City in 1957. López Charretón knew from a young age that she wanted to pursue biology. López Charretón followed her passion for Biology and enrolled into the Universidad Nacional Autónoma de México (UNAM), where she completed her bachelor's in basic biomedical research in 1980, followed by a masters in 2003 and a PhD in 2006. While finishing her graduate degrees, she spent a few years at the California Institute of Technology (Caltech).

López Charretón holds a bachelor's degree (1980), a master's degree (1983) and a doctorate degree (1986) in basic biomedical research from the National Autonomous University of Mexico (UNAM) and currently works for the Institute of Biotechnology of the same university.

== Research interests ==
López Charretón has led her research program as principal investigator at the Biotechnology Institute (UNAM) in Cuernavaca, Mexico. López Charretón serves as a mentor for master's and PhD students, and currently holds a SNI level III investigator status. Throughout her career, López Charretón has made advancements in our understanding of rotavirus. One of the most important findings from López Charretón research group is related to viral entry into a human body. Rotavirus is spread through the mouth and skin, but the virus leaves those cells alone and only infects and reproduces in cells in the small intestine. She has additionally studied how the rotavirus spreads in human populations, the immune response to it, and its replication cycle. This work has contributed to new diagnostic tests, isolation of new strains, and efforts towards a vaccine. She's published more than 130 papers in international journals. She also spent nearly nine years serving on the editorial board for the Journal of Virology.

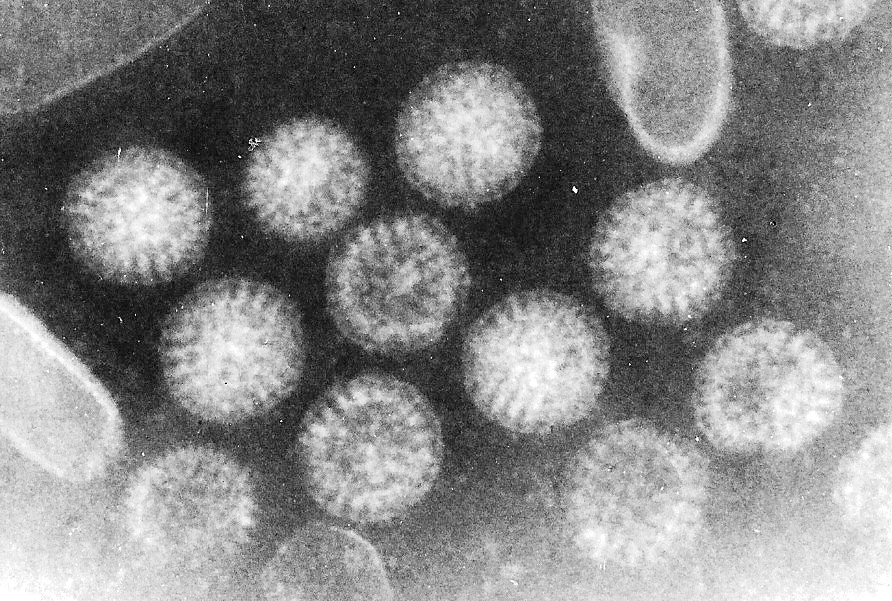
electron microscopy image of rotavirus

From 2000 to 2010, she was a Howard Hughes Medical Institute International Research Scholar.

== Awards and recognition ==
López Charretón won the Gabino Barreda Medal from UNAM in 1988 for her PhD research. In 1991, she was a Fogarty Fellow. López Charretón won the Funsalud Biennial Award in Gastrointestinal Diseases from the Mexican Foundation for Health in 2000 and 2002. In 2001, she was awarded the Carlos J. Finlay Prize for Microbiology from the United Nations Educational, Scientific and Cultural Organization (UNESCO). In 2000, Dr. López Charretón became an International Research Scholar with the Howard Hughes Medical Institute (HHMI) providing funding for the potentially transformative impact of her rotavirus research.

In 2010, HHMI asked López Charretón what she would do to change the world in one year. She responded, "I would invest that year in convincing people who make enormous amounts of money (TV and movie stars, singers, athletes, etc.) to donate just a small part of their earnings to make a well-administered foundation, with the sole purpose of ensuring that every child in underdeveloped countries has access to all available vaccines, independent of their cost, and to guarantee that these children are nourished properly during the first five years of their lives. This would help give a fair start in life to the people born in underdeveloped nations."

In 2012, López Charretón won the LÓréal-UNESCO Prize for Women in Science, a prestigious prize given to only one woman scientist per continent each year. López Charretón won the award for Latin America for "identifying how rotaviruses cause the death of 600,000 children each year." That same year, she was also awarded the Omecihuatl Medal from the Women's Institute of Mexico City. In 2013, López Charretón received the "Premio Universidad Nacional" for Natural Sciences research. And in 2014 she was recognized as one of the BBC's 100 Women.

== Personal life ==
She was a co-recipient (along her husband, Carlos Arias Ortiz) of both the 2001 Carlos J. Finlay Prize for Microbiology and the 2008 TWAS Prize in Biology. López Charretón and her husband have two children, Rodrigo and Alejandra. She lives in Mexico City.
