= Carlos Arias Ortiz =

Mexican biochemist

Carlos Federico Arias Ortiz
- Born: Mexico
- Education: National Autonomous University of Mexico
- Awards: Carlos J. Finlay Prize for Microbiology (UNESCO, 2001) and TWAS Prize in Biology, 2008.
- Scientific career
- Fields: Virology
- Workplaces: Institute of Biotechnology, National Autonomous University of Mexico (UNAM)

Carlos Federico Arias Ortiz is a Mexican biochemist specialized in rotaviruses. Along his wife, Susana López Charretón, he has been a co-recipient of both the 2001 Carlos J. Finlay Prize for Microbiology and the 2008 TWAS Prize in Biology.

Arias Ortiz holds a bachelor's degree in Pharmacology and both a master's and a doctorate degree in basic biomedical research from the National Autonomous University of Mexico (UNAM). Currently, he works for the Institute of Biotechnology of the same university.

From 1991 to 2006 he was a Howard Hughes Medical Institute International Research Scholar.

== See also ==
- List of people from Morelos
