= Bangladesh Shishu Hospital & Institute =

Research institute and hospital in Bangladesh

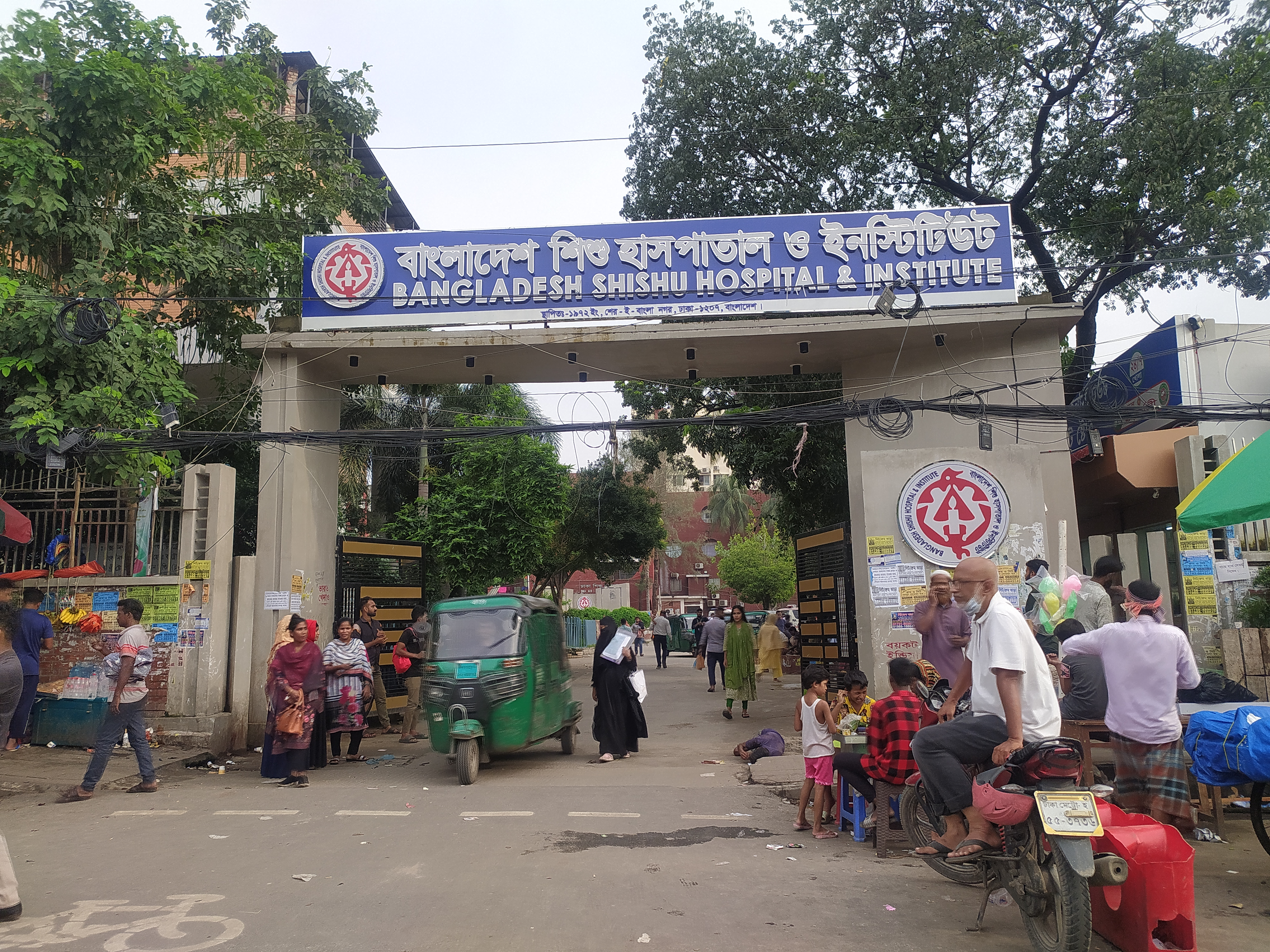
- Formation: 1972 (hospital); 1983 (institute)
- Headquarters: Dhaka, Bangladesh
- Region served: Bangladesh
- Official language: Bengali
- Website: bshi.gov.bd
- Formerly called: Bangladesh Institute of Child Health; Dhaka Shishu Hospital

Bangladesh Shishu Hospital & Institute is a medical and research institute in Dhaka, Bangladesh, specializing in pediatrics.

== History ==
The hospital was established in 1972, immediately following independence. It was funded by the late Tofayel Ahmed, the Bangladesh government, Save the Children Fund of the UK, and World Vision of Bangladesh. Bangladesh Institute of Child Health was established in 1983. It is the academic wing of the Dhaka Shishu Hospital and is affiliated with Dhaka University. It offers a number of graduate degrees, such as Doctor of Medicine, Diploma in Child Health, Fellow of the College of Physicians and Surgeons, and Master of Surgery. It is also affiliated with Bangladesh College of Physicians and Surgeons and Bangladesh Medical University. It also has research ties with the UCL Great Ormond Street Institute of Child Health and Johns Hopkins University.

In 2020, the cabinet of Bangladesh approved a draft law to merge Dhaka Shishu Hospital and Bangladesh Institute of Child Health called the Bangladesh Shishu Hospital and Institute Bill. In 2021, parliament passed the Bangladesh Shishu Hospital & Institute Act (Act No. 19 of 2021), which came into effect on 22 September 2021. Since then, the two institutions, Dhaka Shishu Hospital and Bangladesh Children's Health Institute, have merged to become Bangladesh Shishu Hospital and Institute, which is being operated as a statutory body of the government of Bangladesh.
