= Pneumococcal vaccine =

Vaccine to prevent infection by the bacteria Streptococcus pneumoniae

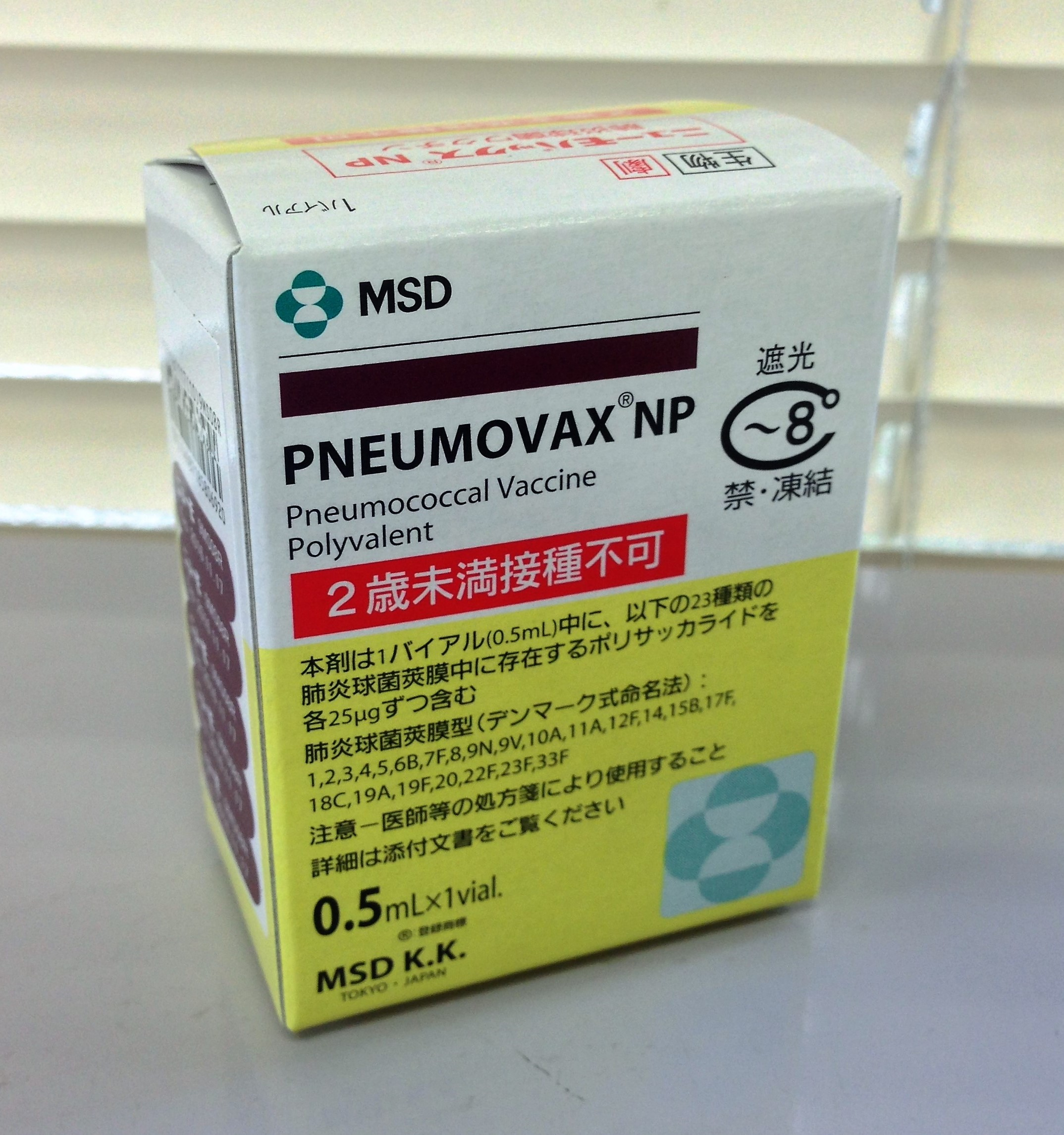
- 23-valent pneumococcal polysaccharide vaccine by MSD as it is marketed in Japan.

Vaccine description
- Target: Streptococcus pneumoniae
- Vaccine type: conjugate, polysaccharide

Clinical data
- AHFS/Drugs.com: Monograph
- Routes of administration: Intramuscular, subcutaneous injection
- ATC code: J07AL01 (WHO) J07AL02 (WHO) J07AL52 (WHO)

Legal status
- Legal status: US: ℞-only; In general: ℞ (Prescription only)

Identifiers
- ChemSpider: none

Pneumococcal vaccines are subunit vaccines against the bacterium Streptococcus pneumoniae. Their use can prevent some cases of pneumonia, meningitis, and sepsis. There are two types of pneumococcal vaccines: conjugate vaccines and polysaccharide vaccines. They are given by injection either into a muscle or just under the skin.

The World Health Organization (WHO) recommends the use of the conjugate vaccine in the routine immunizations given to children. This includes those with HIV/AIDS. The recommended three or four doses are between 71 and 93% effective at preventing severe pneumococcal disease. The polysaccharide vaccines, while effective in healthy adults, are not effective in children less than two years old or those with poor immune function.

These vaccines are generally safe. With the conjugate vaccine, about 10% of babies develop redness at the site of injection, fever, or change in sleep. Severe allergies are very rare.

Whole-cell vaccinations were developed alongside the characterisation of the subtypes of pneumococcus from the early 1900s. The first polysaccharide vaccine (tetravalent) was developed in 1945. The current 23-valent polysaccharide vaccine was developed in the 1980s. The first conjugate vaccine (heptavalent) reached market in 2000. It is on the World Health Organization's List of Essential Medicines.

== Medical uses ==
Share of one year olds vaccinated against streptococcus pneumoniae Map

Different pneumococcal vaccines protect against different serotypes. In particular, their coverage of antibiotic‐resistant serotypes varies. Early vaccines did not cover certain serotypes, which later became a major contributor to antibiotic‐resistant infections. Subsequent vaccines are designed to address this gap.

Antibiotic-resistant serotype coverage
Vaccine	Rollout year	Resistant serotypes						
Vaccine	Rollout year	6A	6B	9V	14	19A	19F	23F
PPSV23	1983	No	Yes	Yes	Yes	Yes	Yes	Yes
PCV13	2010	Yes	Yes	Yes	Yes	Yes	Yes	Yes
PCV20	2021	Yes	Yes	Yes	Yes	Yes	Yes	Yes
PCV15	2022	Yes	Yes	Yes	Yes	Yes	Yes	Yes
PCV21	2024	Yes	No	No	No	Yes	No	Yes

== Recommendations ==
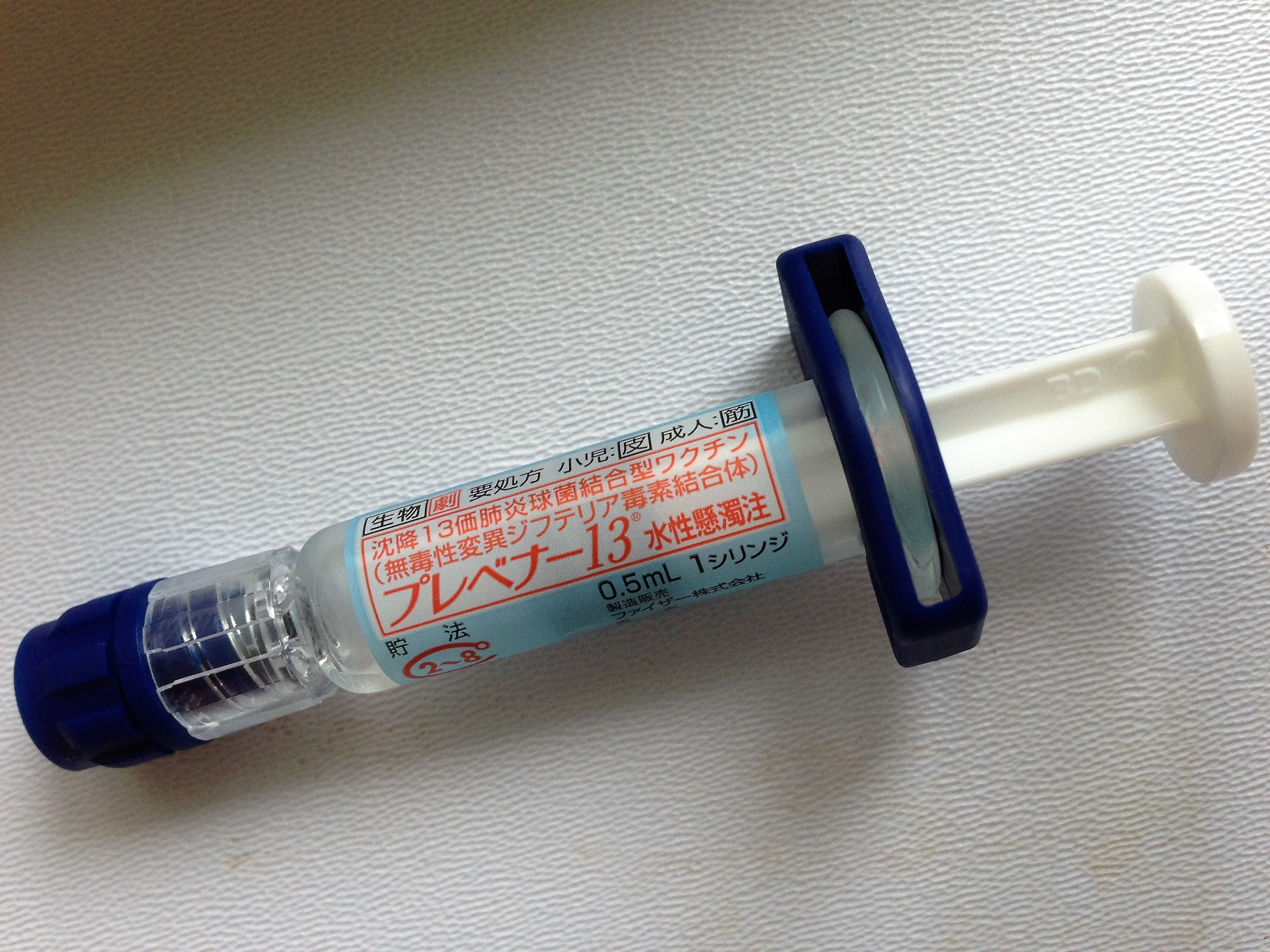
13-valent pneumococcal conjugate vaccine (Prevnar 13) produced by Pfizer Japan in 2013.

=== Worldwide ===
Pneumococcal vaccines Accelerated Development and Introduction Plan (PneumoADIP) is a program to accelerate the evaluation and access to new pneumococcal vaccines in the developing world. PneumoADIP is funded by the Global Alliance for Vaccines and Immunization (GAVI). Thirty GAVI countries have expressed interest in participating by 2010. PneumoADIP aims to save 5.4 million children by 2030.

A pilot Advance Market Commitment (AMC) to develop a vaccine against pneumococcus was launched by GAVI in June 2009 as a strategy to address two of the major policy challenges to vaccine introduction: a lack of affordable vaccines on the market and insufficient commercial incentives to develop vaccines for diseases concentrated in developing countries. Under the terms of an AMC, donors make a legally binding guarantee that, if a future vaccine is developed against a particular disease, they will purchase a predetermined amount at an agreed-upon price. The guarantee is linked to safety and efficacy standards that the vaccine must meet and is structured to allow several firms to compete to develop and produce the best possible new product. AMCs reduce risk to donor governments by eliminating the need to fund individual research and development projects that may never produce a vaccine. If no company produces a vaccine that meets the predetermined standards, governments (and thus their taxpayers) spend nothing. For the bio-pharmaceutical industry, AMCs create a guaranteed market, with a promise of returns that would not normally exist. For developing countries, AMCs provide funding to ensure that those vaccines will be affordable once they have been developed. It is estimated that the pneumococcal AMC could prevent more than 1.5 million childhood deaths by 2020.

Doctors Without Borders has criticized GAVI's pneumococcal AMC for not encouraging innovation, discouraging competition from new market entrants, and raising vaccine costs. They said that it had allowed Pfizer and GlaxoSmithKline to maintain a duopoly while making it more difficult for the Serum Institute of India to sell their cheaper vaccine. The duopoly allowed price discrimination; somewhat higher prices for GAVI, and unaffordable prices (about ten time the GAVI price) for middle-income countries too rich for GAVI aid. The pneumococcal program (unlike previous market-shaping programs from GAVI) did not include any mechanism for increasing competition.

The Humanitarian Mechanism makes the pneumococcal vaccine available to humanitarian actors (but not governments) at a lower-than-normal price during humanitarian emergencies.

=== Belgium ===
The national vaccination program started vaccinating newborns in 2004 with the 7-valent pneumococcal conjugate vaccine (PCV 7). This was changed into the 13-valent conjugate (PCV 13) in 2011. The switch to the 10-valent conjugate (PCV 10) was made in July 2015 in Flanders and May 2016 in Wallonia. In late 2020 a start was made with the vaccination of care home residents with the 23-valant pneumococcal polysaccharide vaccine (PPV 23).

=== Canada ===
The Public Health Agency of Canada's general recommendations are the 13-valent pneumococcal conjugate vaccine (PCV 13) vaccine for children aged 2 months to 18 years and the 23-valent pneumococcal polysaccharide vaccine (PPV 23) vaccine for adults.

=== India ===
In May 2017, the Government of India decided to include the pneumococcal conjugate vaccine in its Universal Immunization Programme.

=== The Netherlands ===
The national vaccination program started including the pneumococcal vaccine for newborns in April 2006.

The Health Council advised in 2018 that those who are over the age of 60 should also be vaccinated on a 5-year recurring schedule. The resulting program, NPPV, started at the end of 2020.

Health authorities reported in December 2020 that former COVID-19 patients also have an indication for this vaccine because of the damage their lungs incurred. Vaccinating this group is not part of the NPPV program.

=== New Zealand ===
The National Immunisation Schedule first introduced pneumococcal vaccination in 2006, starting with PCV7 for high-risk individuals. As of December 2022, the schedule now includes three doses of PCV13 for all infants, given at 6 weeks, 5 months and 12 months of age. A high-risk schedule including a fourth dose is offered for infants with an eligible medical condition, with the additional dose given at 3 months of age. PPV23 is not included in the routine immunisation schedule, but is funded for adults and children over 2 years of age at increased risk of invasive pneumococcal disease.

=== South Africa ===
The 7- and 13-valent pneumococcal conjugate vaccines (PCV7 and PCV13) were introduced into the National Expanded Program on Immunization (EPI) in South Africa in 2009 and 2011, respectively. South Africa became the first African country – and the first nation in the world with a high HIV prevalence – to introduce PCV7 into its routine immunization program. Rates of invasive pneumococcal disease (IPD) – including cases caused by antibiotic-resistant bacteria – have fallen substantially in South Africa following the introduction of PCV7. Among children under two years of age, the overall incidence of IPD declined nearly 70% after PCV introduction, and rates of IPD caused by bacteria specifically targeted by the vaccine decreased nearly 90%. Due to the indirect protection conferred by herd immunity, a significant decline in IPD in children and in unvaccinated adults has also been shown.

Pneumovax 23 is used for all ages and, according to the enclosed patient information leaflet, has a reported 76% to 92% protective efficacy (pneumococcal types 1, 2, 3, 4, 5, 6B**, 7F, 8, 9N, 9V**, 10A, 11A, 12F, 14**, 15B, 17F, 18C, 19A**, 19F**, 20, 22F, 23F** and 33F** are included, where ** indicates drug-resistant pneumococcal infections; these are the 23 most prevalent or invasive pneumococcal types of Streptococcus pneumoniae).

=== United Kingdom ===
It was announced in February 2006, that the UK government would introduce vaccination with the conjugate vaccine in children aged 2, 4 and 13 months. This included changes to the immunisation programme in general. In 2009, the European Medicines Agency approved the use of a 10 valent pneumococcal conjugate vaccine for use in Europe. The 13-valent pneumococcal vaccine was introduced in the routine immunization schedule of the UK in April 2010.

=== United States ===
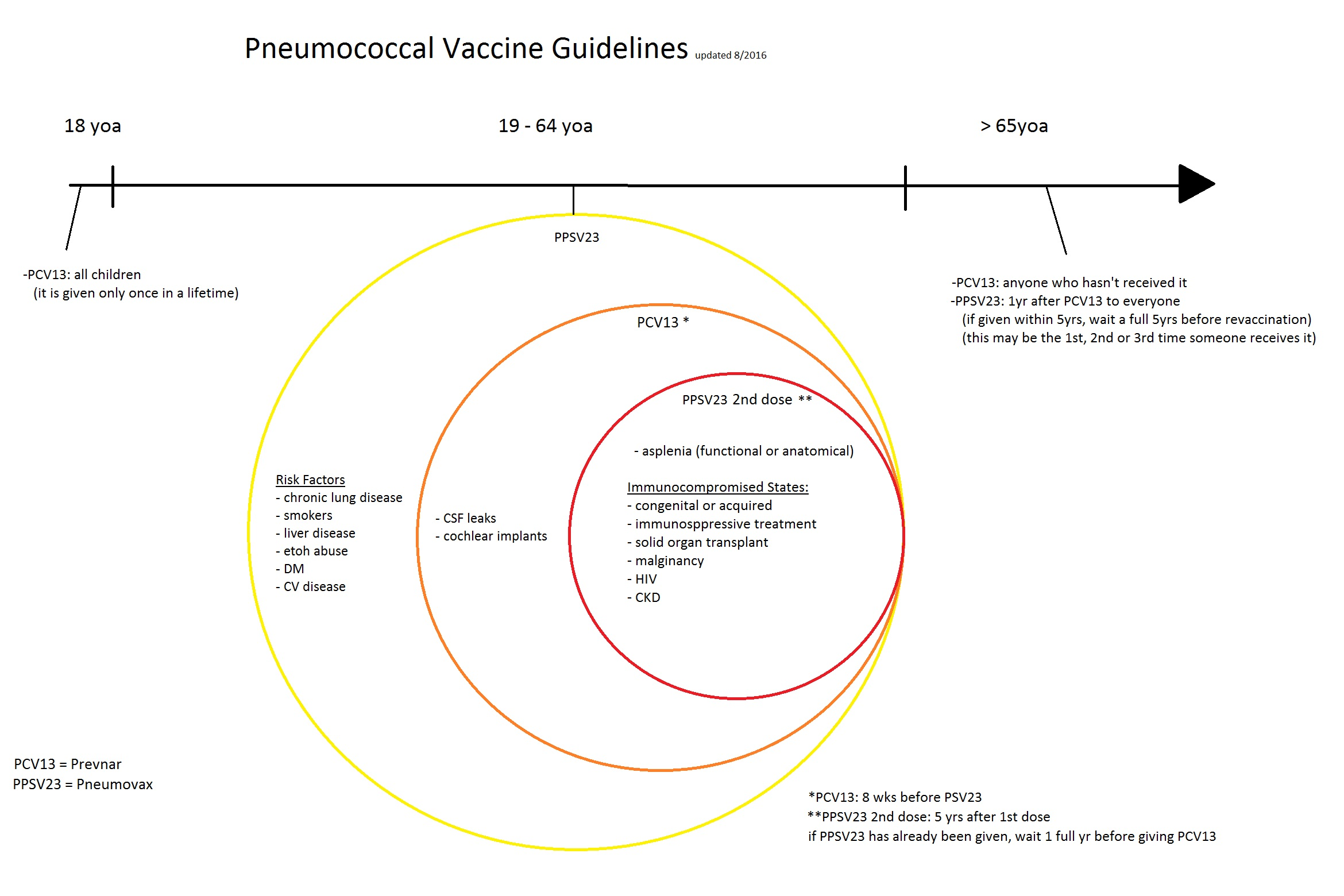
Diagram with visual representation of the current indications for both the Prevnar and the Pneumovax.

In the United States, a heptavalent pneumococcal conjugate vaccine (PCV 7) (Prevnar) was recommended for all children aged 2–23 months and for at-risk children aged 24–59 months in 2000. The normal four-dose series is given at 2, 4, 6, and 12–14 months of age. In February 2010, a pneumococcal conjugate vaccine that protects against an additional six serotypes was introduced (PCV 13/brand name: Prevnar 13) and can be given instead of the original Prevnar. In June 2021, a pneumococcal conjugate vaccine which protects against 20 serotypes was approved with the brand name Prevnar 20. In April 2023, the FDA approved the use of Prevnar 20 vaccine to prevent pneumococcal disease in children aged six weeks to 17 years.

Pneumovax 23 (pneumococcal vaccine polyvalent) was approved for medical use in the United States in 1983.

Vaxneuvance (pneumococcal 15-valent conjugate vaccine) was approved for medical use in the United States in June 2021.

Capvaxive (pneumococcal 21-valent conjugate vaccine) was approved for medical use in the United States in June 2024.

In October 2024, the Centers for Disease Control and Prevention (CDC) updated its recommendations for the pneumococcal vaccination and recommends routine pneumococcal vaccination for all children younger than 5 years of age and all adults 50 years of age or older.

== Mechanism ==
=== Polysaccharide vaccine ===
The pneumococcal polysaccharide vaccine most commonly used today consists of purified polysaccharides from 23 serotypes (1, 2, 3, 4, 5, 6b, 7F, 8, 9N, 9V, 10A, 11A, 12F, 14, 15B, 17F, 18C, 19A, 19F, 20, 22F, 23F, and 33F). Immunity is induced primarily through stimulation of B-cells which release IgM without the assistance of T cells.

This immune response is less robust than the response provoked by conjugated vaccines, which has several consequences. The vaccine is ineffective in children less than 2 years old, presumably due to their less mature immune systems. Non-response is also common amongst older adults. Immunity is not lifelong, so individuals must be re-vaccinated at age 65 if their initial vaccination was given at age 60 or younger. Since no mucosal immunity is provoked, the vaccine does not affect carrier rates, promote herd immunity, or protect against upper or lower respiratory tract infections. Finally, provoking immune responses using unconjugated polysaccharides from the capsules of other bacteria, such as H. influenzae, has proven significantly more difficult.

=== Conjugated vaccine ===
The pneumococcal conjugate vaccine (PCV) consists of capsular polysaccharides covalently bound to the diphtheria toxoid CRM197, which is highly immunogenic but non-toxic. This combination provokes a significantly more robust immune response by recruiting CRM197-specific type 2 helper T cells, which allow for immunoglobulin type switching (to produce non-IgM immunoglobulin) and production of memory B cells. Among other things, this results in mucosal immunity and the eventual establishment of lifelong immunity after several exposures.

For targeted serotypes, the PCV reduces colonization rates and provides herd immunity. It also appears to reduce the development of antimicrobial resistance among targeted serotypes.

The main drawbacks of conjugated vaccines are that they only protect against a subset of the serotypes covered by the polysaccharide vaccines.

== Research ==
Due to the geographic distribution of pneumococcal serotypes, additional research is needed to find the most efficacious vaccine for developing-world populations. In a previous study, the most common pneumococcal serotypes or groups from developed countries were found to be, in descending order, 14, 6, 19, 18, 9, 23, 7, 4, 1, and 15. In developing countries, the order was 6, 14, 8, 5, 1, 19, 9, 23, 18, 15 and 7. In order to further pneumococcal vaccine research and reduce childhood mortality, five countries and the Bill & Melinda Gates Foundation established a pilot Advance Market Commitment for pneumococcal vaccines worth US$1.5 billion. Advance Market Commitments are a new approach to public health funding designed to stimulate the development and manufacture of vaccines for developing countries.

There is research into producing vaccines that can be given into the nose rather than by injection.

The development of serotype-specific anticapsular monoclonal antibodies has also been researched in recent years. These antibodies have been shown to prolong survival in a mouse model of pneumococcal infection characterized by a reduction in bacterial loads and a suppression of the host inflammatory response. Additional pneumococcal vaccine research is taking place to find a vaccine that offers broad protection against pneumococcal disease.

As of 2017, pneumonia vaccines target up to 23 forms of the bacterium that cause pneumonia with a new version under development covering 72 strains of the bacterium.

=== Nonspecific effects ===
A 2004 study reports that PCV reduces rates of RSV hospitalizations in children.

A 2024 British meta-analysis reports that the PCV appears to provide some off-target protection from several viral respiratory infections. The evidence is strongest for influenza in children.
