= Dhaka Shishu Hospital =

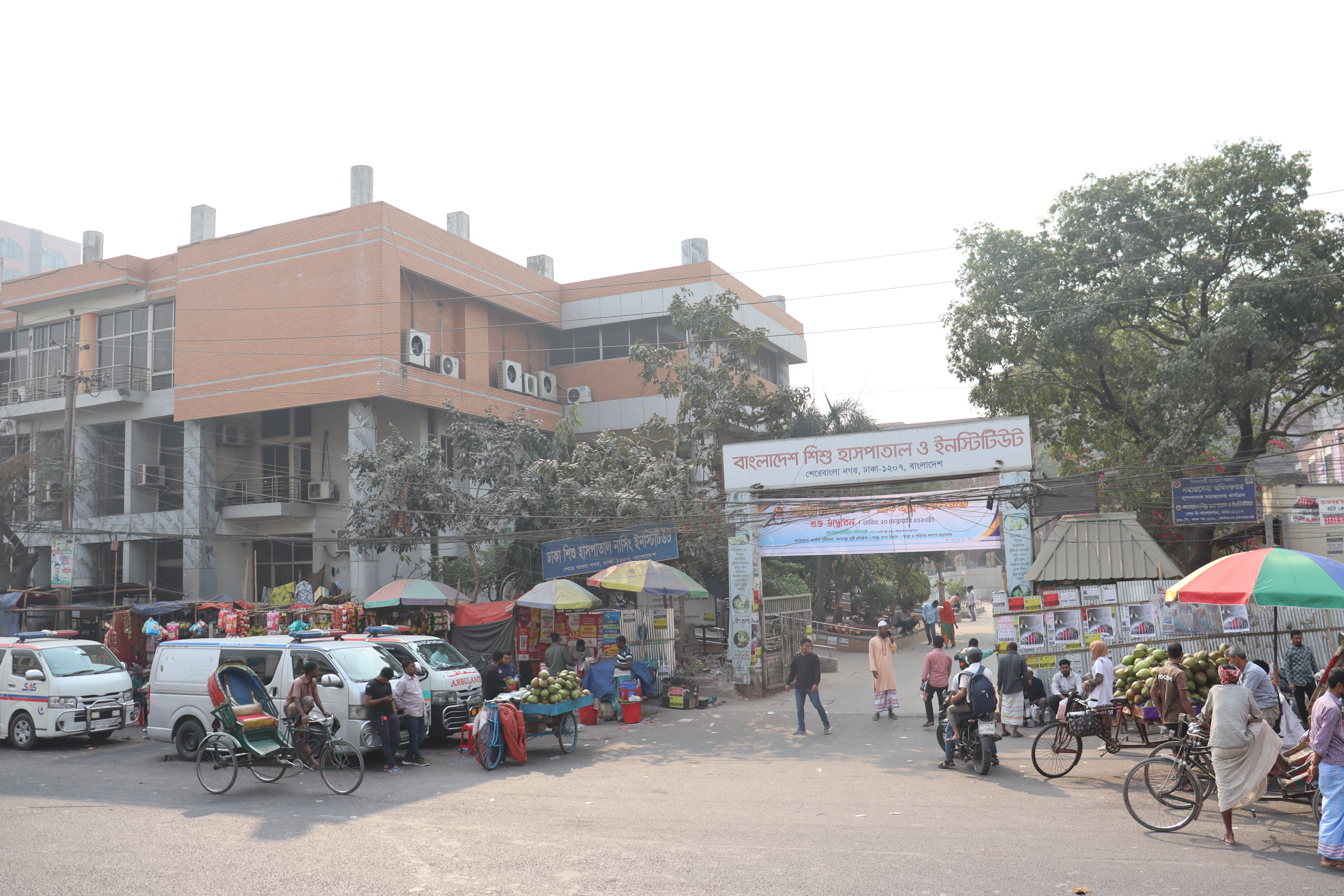

Geography
- Location: Dhaka, Bangladesh
- Coordinates: 23.7732°N 90.3689°E

Services
- Beds: 650

Links
- Lists: Hospitals in Bangladesh

Dhaka Shishu Hospital (currently Bangladesh Shishu Hospital & Institute) is a children's hospital in Bangladesh, located in Sher-e-Bangla Nagar, Dhaka.

== History ==
The hospital was established in 1972, immediately following independence. It was funded by the late Tofayel Ahmed, the Bangladesh government, Save the Children Fund of the UK and World Vision of Bangladesh. The hospital publishes the Dhaka Shishu (Children) Hospital Journal.

In 2021, the National Parliament passed the Bangladesh Shishu Hospital & Institute Act (Act No. 19 of 2021), which came into effect on 22 September 2021. Since then, the two institutions, Dhaka Shishu Hospital and Bangladesh Children's Health Institute, have merged to become Bangladesh Shishu Hospital & Institute, which is being operated as a statutory body of the Government of Bangladesh.

== Funding and resources ==
The hospital is administered by a management board appointed by the Ministry of Health & Family Welfare of Bangladesh. The Ministry provides 50% of total annual funding, and the remainder is funded by payment for services, individual donations and grants. The Bangladesh Shishu Hospital Trust, created by two public lotteries as well as donations, provides additional financial support when necessary.

The average occupancy rate in 1999 was about 90%. By 2017, the capacity had risen to 650 beds and as of 2020 it was the largest children's hospital in Bangladesh.

== Gallery ==
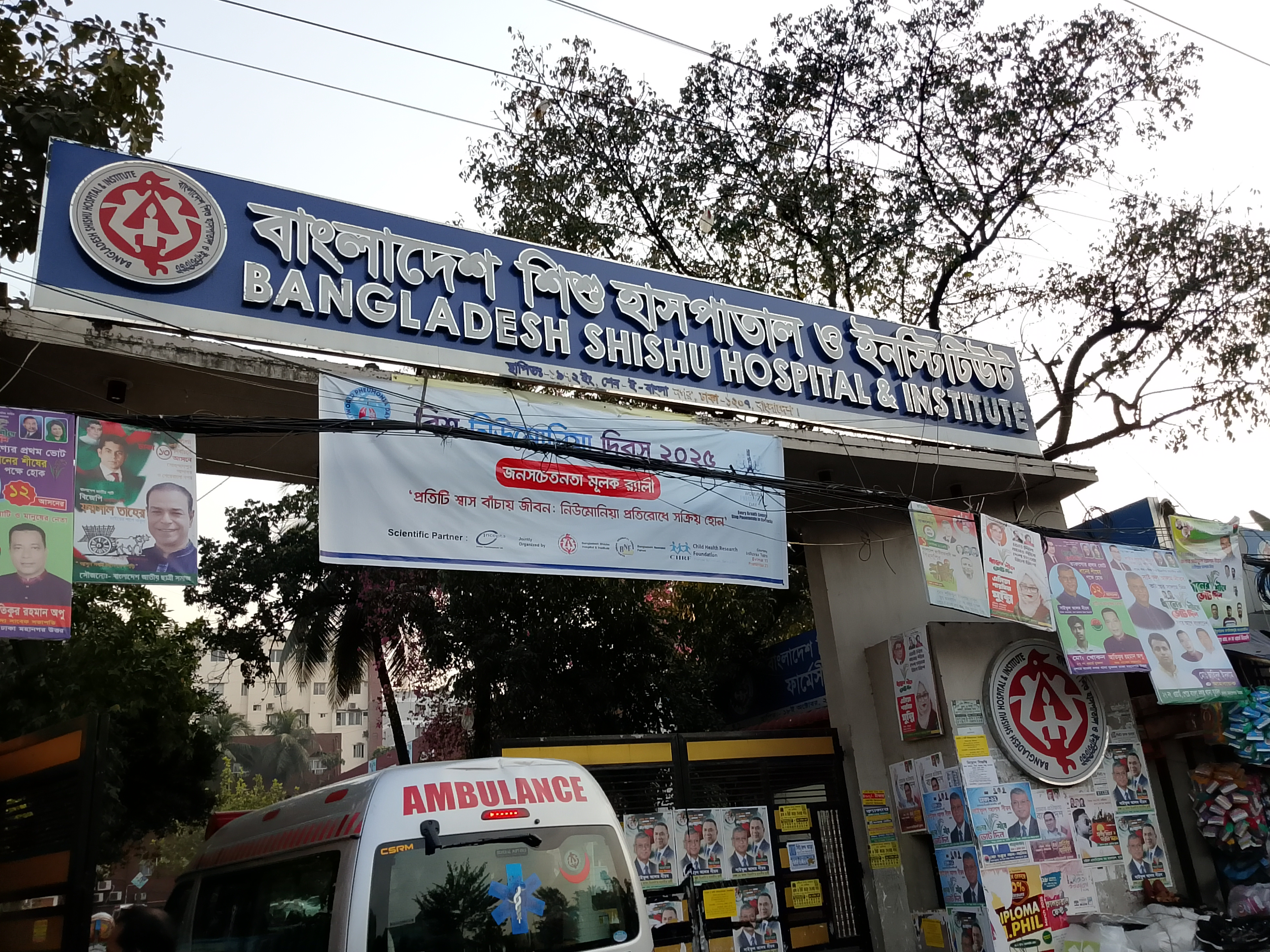
Bangladesh Shishu (Children) Hospital entrance gate

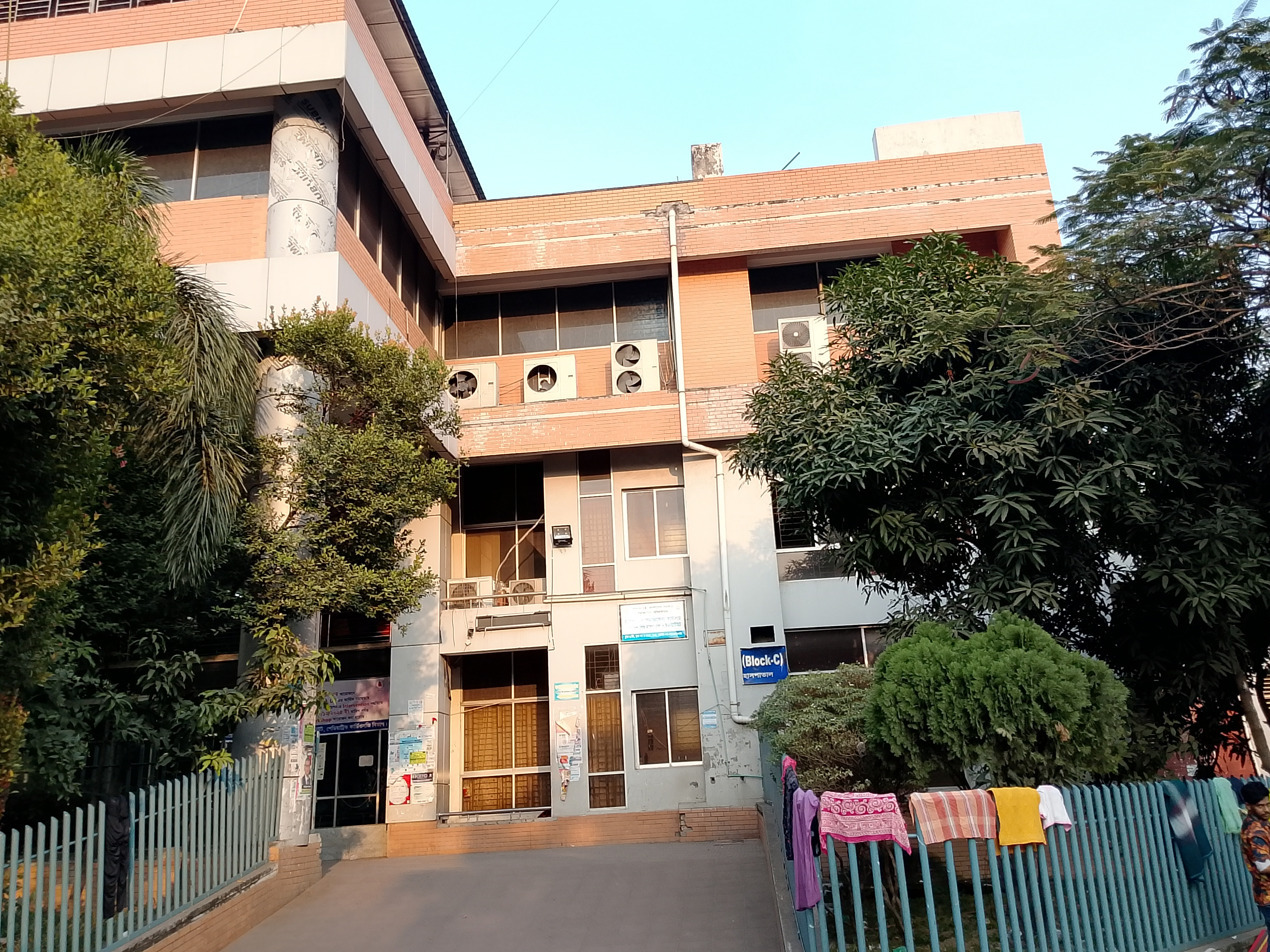
Bangladesh Shishu (Children) Hospital Block-C
