= Sabin Vaccine Institute =

Nonprofit organization in Washington D.C., United States

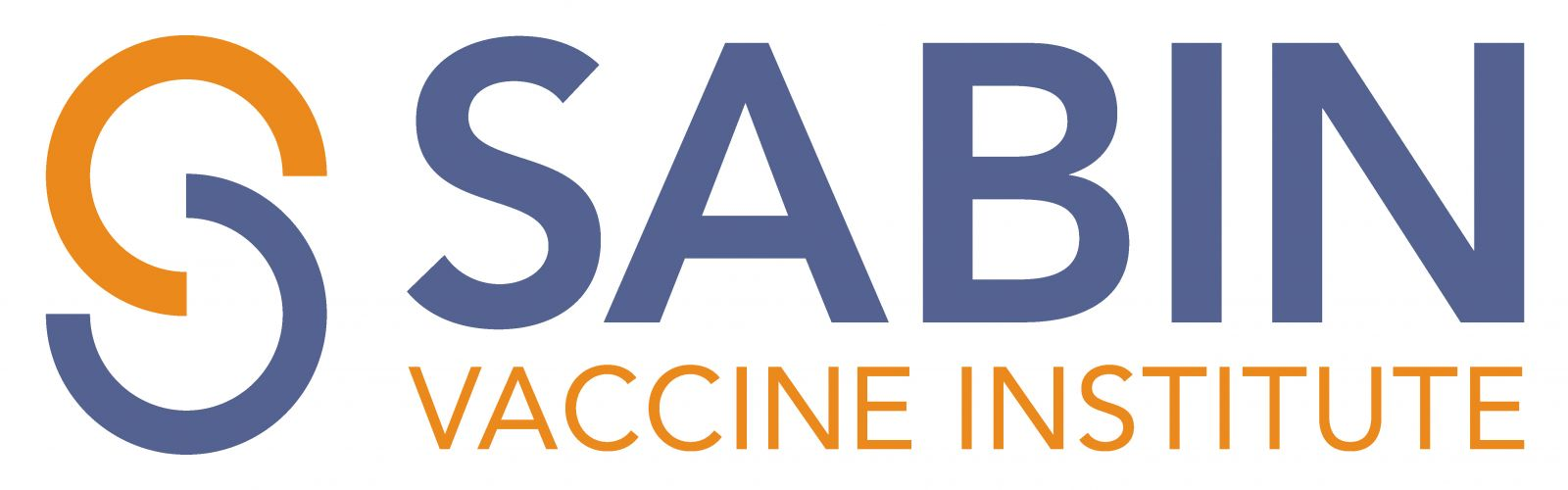
- Named after: Albert B. Sabin
- Established: 1993; 33 years ago
- Founders: Heloisa Sabin; H.R. Shepherd; Robert M. Chanock; Philip Russell
- Type: Charitable organization
- Purpose: Advance new vaccines and expand vaccination coverage globally
- Headquarters: Washington, D.C.
- Coordinates: 38°54′01″N 77°02′46″W
- CEO: Amy Finan
- Website: www.sabin.org

Sabin Vaccine Institute (/ˈseɪbɪn/ SAY-bin), located in Washington, D.C., is a global nonprofit organization that advances vaccine development for unmet medical needs and expands immunization coverage by strengthening vaccine access and acceptance.

In partnership with local organizations, governments and international health entities, Sabin aims to drive progress across the vaccines-to-vaccinations spectrum — from developing vaccines for outbreak-prone diseases such as Marburg virus and Sudan ebolavirus to improving the delivery of routine childhood and adult vaccinations on the ground.Through its work to prevent the spread of vaccine-preventable infectious diseases, Sabin seeks to save lives and boost health outcomes so that communities around the world might flourish.

== Background ==
Founded in 1993 in honor of Albert B. Sabin, creator of the oral polio vaccine, the Sabin Vaccine Institute works to realize Dr. Sabin's commitment to extend the full benefits of vaccines to all individuals, especially the world's most vulnerable including children and the elderly. Dr. Sabin declined to patent his vaccine, wanting it to be as widely affordable and accessible as possible, a philosophy that continues to inspire Sabin's organizational mission.

== Vaccine development and research ==
Sabin advances research for vaccines with limited commercial interest but high public health value, particularly for outbreak-prone diseases in low- and middle-income countries (LMICs). In 2012, Sabin partnered with International Vaccine Institute to combine their research, development, and promotion efforts in Asia, Africa, and the Americas. In 2019, it licensed the cAd3 vaccine platform from GSK. Sabin's single-dose investigational vaccines for Marburg virus disease and Sudan ebolavirus disease are currently in Phase 2 clinical trials. Sabin's work on these two filovirus vaccine candidates builds on the work conducted by the Vaccine Research Center at the National Institute of Allergy and Infectious Diseases, part of the National Institutes of Health.

== Advocacy and education ==
Sabin collaborates with experts and organizations from around the world to advance knowledge of both infectious diseases and the vaccines that can prevent them. Sabin serves as the secretariat for the Coalition against Typhoid and the Global HPV Consortium.Sabin supports research and professional development to improve vaccine delivery and acceptance worldwide. Its programs are geared to help countries assess vaccine impact, explore social and behavioral factors influencing immunization, and connect immunization professionals through training and collaboration.

== Gold medal award ==
First awarded in 1994, the Albert B. Sabin Gold Medal is presented by Sabin each year to one or more persons who have made a major contribution to the field of vaccinology or related fields. The award is given in honor of the work of Albert B. Sabin. In 2020, Sabin launched the annual Sabin Rising Star Award to recognize an early or mid-career researcher under 40 years of age whose work is both advancing the field of immunization and furthering vaccine equity.
