= List of Guggenheim Fellowships awarded in 1997 =

List of Guggenheim Fellowships awarded in 1997.

Fellow	Category	Field of Study
André Aciman	Creative Arts	General Nonfiction
Jorge Enrique Adoum	Creative Arts	General Nonfiction
Guenter Ahlers	Natural Sciences	Physics
M. Jacquiline Alexander	Social Sciences	Anthropology & Cultural Studies
Millard Alexander	Natural Sciences	Chemistry
Albert W. Alschuler	Social Sciences	Law
James E. Alt	Social Sciences	Political Science
Francisco Javier Alvarez-Leefmans	Natural Sciences	Neuroscience
Maryanne Amacher	Creative Arts	Video & Audio
Henning Andersen	Humanities	Linguistics
Eleanor Antin	Creative Arts	Fine Arts
George Arasimowicz	Creative Arts	Music Composition
Juan J. Armesto	Natural Sciences	Plant Sciences
Eduardo Arzt	Natural Sciences	Molecular & Cellular Biology
Kariamu Welsh Asante	Creative Arts	Choreography
Mahzarin R. Banaji	Social Sciences	Psychology
Andrea Barrett	Creative Arts	Fiction
Rick Bass		Fiction
Carmen Berenguer		Fiction
Mary Berridge	Creative Arts	Photography
Mario Biagioli		History of Science & Technology
Peter W. M. Blayney		Bibliography
Jeffrey Bluestone		Medicine & Health
Paul Bochner		Fine Arts
Luciano Boi		Philosophy
Gregg Bordowitz	Creative Arts	Film
Sugata Bose		South Asian Studies
Ricardo Brey		Fine Arts
John L. Brooke		U.S. History
Caroline A. Bruzelius		Architecture, Planning, & Design
Norman Bryson		Fine Arts Research
Louise M. Burkhart		Anthropology & Cultural Studies
John D. Burt	Humanities	American Literature
Robert A. Burt		Law
Jesse L. Byock	Social Sciences	Anthropology & Cultural Studies
Rafael Campo		Poetry
Rimer Cardillo		Fine Arts
Mario Carretero		Psychology
Glenn R. Carroll		Sociology
Paul Michael Chaikin		Physics
Ivan V. Cherednik		Applied Mathematics
Sallie W. Chisholm		Organismic Biology & Ecology
Thomas Cogswell		British History
Vincent Crawford		Economics
Deborah Dancy	Creative Arts	Fine Arts
Lydia Davis		Fiction
Nicholas Dawidoff	Creative Arts	Biography
David G. De Long		Architecture, Planning, & Design
Carolyn J. Dean		French History
Olivier Debroise		Fine Arts Research
Eduardo Del Valle	Creative Arts	Photography
Barbara B. Diefendorf		French History
Nathaniel Dorsky	Creative Arts	Film
Persis S. Drell		Physics
Thomas A. DuBois		Folklore & Popular Culture
Maud Ellmann	Humanities	English Literature
Laura Engelstein	Humanities	Russian History
Arturo Escobar	Social Sciences	Anthropology & Cultural Studies
Abelardo José Estorino López	Creative Arts	Drama & Performance Art
Gordon L. Fain	Natural Sciences	Neuroscience
Jorge Fons	Creative Arts	Film
Donal Fox	Creative Arts	Music Composition
María Cristina Fraire	Creative Arts	Photography
Jonathan Freedman	Humanities	Literary Criticism
Judith Freeman	Creative Arts	Fiction
Alan Frieze	Natural Sciences	Computer Science
Harry L. Frisch	Natural Sciences	Chemistry
Patricia Fumerton	Humanities	English Literature
Daniel E. Gómez		Molecular & Cellular Biology
Mirta Gómez Del Valle	Creative Arts	Photography
Jeremy Gilbert-Rolfe		Fine Arts
Karin Giusti		Fine Arts
Luis Miguel Glave		Iberian & Latin American History
James Goodman		U.S. History
Elliott J. Gorn	Creative Arts	Biography
Elizabeth Graver		Fiction
Slawomir Grünberg	Creative Arts	Film
John Hagan	Social Sciences	Sociology
Joanna Haigood	Creative Arts	Choreography
Jeffrey F. Hamburger	Humanities	Medieval History
Michele Hannoosh		French Literature
Miriam Bratu Hansen		Film, Video, & Radio Studies
Anne Harris		Fine Arts
Stephen Hartke		Music Composition
Ross Hassig		Anthropology & Cultural Studies
Douglas J. Henderson		Chemistry
Jeffrey Henderson		Classics
Gilbert Herdt		Anthropology & Cultural Studies
George C. Herring		U.S. History
Michael Hersch		Music Composition
Jennifer Elaine Higdon	Creative Arts	Music Composition
Mary T. Hufford		Folklore & Popular Culture
Melissa Hui		Music Composition
Terence Irwin	Humanities	Philosophy
Allen F. Isaacman	Humanities	African Studies
Ivan Antonio Izquierdo	Natural Sciences	Medicine & Health
Yvonne Jacquette		Fine Arts
Melinda James		Fine Arts
Iain M. Johnstone		Statistics
Nicole Jordan		German & East European History
Lily E. Kay		History of Science & Technology
Boaz Keysar		Psychology
Charles B. Kimmel		Molecular & Cellular Biology
Lynn Marie Kirby	Creative Arts	Film
Mark Kirkpatrick		Organismic Biology & Ecology
Sergiu Klainerman		Mathematics
Daniel J. Klionsky		Molecular & Cellular Biology
Geoffrey Koziol		Medieval History
Mark LaPore	Creative Arts	Film
James Lasdun		Poetry
An-My Lê	Creative Arts	Photography
Barbara Lebow		Drama & Performance Art
Thomas M. Liggett		Statistics
Judith Linhares		Fine Arts
Lydia H. Liu		East Asian Studies
Margot Livesey		Fiction
Charles Long		Fine Arts
Marvin W. Makinen		Molecular & Cellular Biology
Jacqui Malone		Folklore & Popular Culture
Carlos Eugênio Marcondes de Moura		Sociology
Charles R. Marshall		Earth Science
Anthony W. Marx		Political Science
Khaled Mattawa		Poetry
Mercedes Matter		Fine Arts
Donald McDonagh		Dance Studies
Sheila McTighe		Fine Arts Research
Jean Meyer		Iberian & Latin American History
Helena Michie		English Literature
James Miller		General Nonfiction
Michael B. Miller		Economic History
Carlos Monsiváis		General Nonfiction
Susan Morgan	Creative Arts	Biography
Eduardo J. Muñoz-Ordoqui	Creative Arts	Photography
Robert E. Norton		German & Scandinavian Literature
Naomi Shihab Nye	Creative Arts	Poetry
Katherine O'Brien O'Keeffe	Humanities	Medieval Literature
Kira Obolensky	Creative Arts	Drama & Performance Art
Jacob K. Olupona	Humanities	Religion
Jacqueline Osherow	Creative Arts	Poetry
Nadín Ospina	Creative Arts	Fine Arts
Paulo Antonio Paranaguá		Film, Video, & Radio Studies
Luis Raul Pericchi		Mathematics
Cara Perlman		Fine Arts
Carl Phillips		Poetry
Andrew Pickering		Intellectual & Cultural History
Robert Polito		General Nonfiction
David Politzer		Physics
Paras N. Prasad		Engineering
Pedro Prieto		Physics
Rafael Quintero López	Social Sciences	Political Science
Larry Racioppo	Creative Arts	Photography
Ronald Radano		Folklore & Popular Culture
Debraj Ray		Economics
Angeles B. Ribera		Neuroscience
Alan Richardson		English Literature
Douglas Richstone		Astronomy—Astrophysics
Dagmar Ringe		Molecular & Cellular Biology
J. Edgardo Rivera Martínez		Fiction
Russell L. Roberts		Fine Arts
Guillermo Orlando Rojas Feliz	Creative Arts	Film
Peter J. Rossky		Chemistry
Joan Shelley Rubin		U.S. History
Allen Ruppersberg		Fine Arts
Michael J. Ryan		Organismic Biology & Ecology
Federico J. Sabina		Mathematics
Peter Sacks		Poetry
Eric Maurice Saks	Creative Arts	Film
Barbara A. Schaal		Plant Sciences
Raymond W. Schmitt		Earth Science
Michael Sells		Near Eastern Studies
Adrian Shubert		Iberian & Latin American History
Pierre Sikivie		Astronomy—Astrophysics
Laurie Simmons		Fine Arts
Pamela H. Smith		Intellectual & Cultural History
Rolf Sternglanz		Molecular & Cellular Biology
Susan Straight		Fiction
Arthur Sze	Creative Arts	Poetry
Denyse Thomasos	Creative Arts	Fine Arts
Michael Tomasello	Social Sciences	Psychology
Muriel Topaz	Humanities	Dance Studies
Trimpin	Creative Arts	Music Composition
Ernesto Vila	Creative Arts	Fine Arts
Alicia Villarreal	Creative Arts	Fine Arts
Kari Vilonen	Natural Sciences	Mathematics
Paul S. Weiss	Natural Sciences	Molecular & Cellular Biology
Dan Welcher	Creative Arts	Music Composition
Merry E. Wiesner-Hanks	Humanities	Renaissance History
David R. Williams	Natural Sciences	Neuroscience
Terry Tempest Williams	Creative Arts	General Nonfiction
Jennifer Wolch	Social Sciences	Geography & Environmental Studies
Cynthia Griffin Wolff	Humanities	American Literature
Bill Young	Creative Arts	Choreography
Lai-Sang Young	Natural Sciences	Applied Mathematics
Caveh Zahedi	Creative Arts	Film
Jorge Zanelli Iglesias	Natural Sciences	Physics
James E. G. Zetzel	Humanities	Classics
