= Caroline Brady (philologist) =

American philologist (1905–1980)

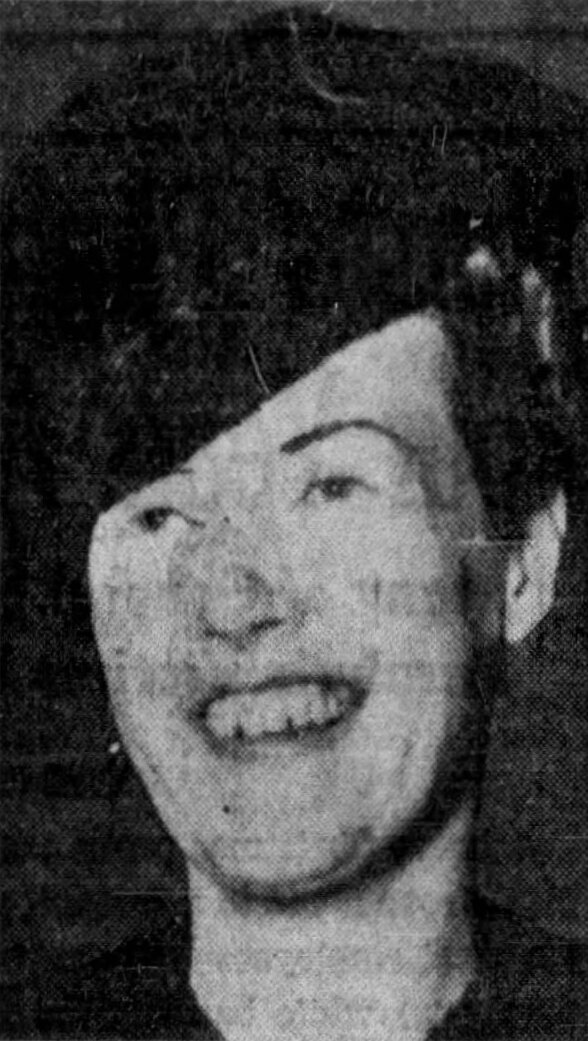
- Brady c. 1938
- Born: Caroline Agnes Brady; October 3, 1905; Tientsin, China
- Died: November 5, 1980 (aged 75); Bellevue, Washington, US
- Education: University of California, Los Angeles (BA); University of California, Berkeley (MA, PhD)
- Occupation: Philologist
- Years active: 1933–1980
- Notable work: The Legends of Ermanaric (1943); three articles on Beowulf (1952, 1979, 1983)

Caroline Agnes Brady (also known as Caroline Agnes Von Egmont Brady; October 3, 1905 – November 5, 1980) was an American philologist who specialised in Old English and Old Norse works. Her works included the 1943 book The Legends of Ermanaric, based on her doctoral dissertation, and three influential papers on the Anglo-Saxon poem Beowulf. She taught at the University of California, Berkeley, the University of Pennsylvania, Johns Hopkins University, and Harvard University, among other places.

Brady was born an American citizen in Tientsin, China, and traveled frequently as a child, spending time in Los Angeles, California, British Columbia, and Austin, Texas. She studied in the University of California system, receiving her bachelor's and master's degrees, and her Ph.D. in 1935. She next became an English instructor at that university's College of Agriculture, and worked as an assistant professor of languages and literature at Berkeley from 1941 to 1946. The following three years were spent at the University of Pennsylvania, until, at the end of 1949, Brady moved to teach at Central Oregon Community College; her resignation due to "ill health" was announced a few months later. After being named the 1952–53 Marion Talbot Fellow of the American Association of University Women and writing two articles, Brady's scholarship ceased for a quarter of a century. In 1979, and posthumously in 1983, her final two articles were published.

Brady's monograph, The Legends of Ermanaric, argued that the Gothic king Ermanaric was subject to two competing traditions, and earned her a reputation as "a broad and discriminating investigator" with "a sovereign disregard of established opinion". Her papers on Beowulf, meanwhile, were identified by Katherine O'Brien O'Keeffe, a scholar of Anglo-Saxon literature, as "three fundamental studies" that were "philological in the traditional sense", shedding light on "the shades of meaning of the diction" used in the poem. Brady concluded that the Beowulf poet "is no artificer mechanically piling up synonyms and conventional metaphors, but an artist who knows how to use a variety of words and phrases".

== Early life and education ==
Caroline Agnes Brady was born on October 3, 1905, in Tientsin, China. She was the daughter of United States Army Colonel David John Brady, an engineer who was then the general manager of the Chinese Engineering and Mining Company in Qinhuangdao, and his wife (Annie Lucy) Maude Short, daughter of John Short, the deputy prothonotary of Sherbrooke, Quebec. (Note: In Caroline Brady's entry in Who's Who in California, she gives her mother's name as "Maud (Short)", which is also the name used in Maud Brady's obituary (1959) and in her death record in California (which also states her date of birth was March 12, 1877, and her mother's maiden name was Green). However, the newspaper notice of Maud Short's 1904 marriage in China to D. J. Brady, "general manager of the Chinese Engineering & Mining Co., Chin-Wang-Tao", names her as "A. L. Maude, dau. of the late John Short of Granby, formerly deputy prothonotary at Sherbrooke"; the marriage record itself calls her Annie Lucy Maude, daughter of the late John Short, a lawyer. The book Loyalist Lineages of Canada traces the family history further, noting that Annie Lucy Maude Short (b. March 12, 1877) was the daughter of John Short (1828–1904), originally from Three Rivers and later of Granby, and his wife Annie Caroline (1854–1936), daughter of Henry Schlicter Greene and his wife Susanna Helmer (d. 1916), herself the daughter of Andrew Helmer and his wife Marie Susanna Caroline Van Egmond (1810–1861), daughter of Anthony Van Egmond.) The two had married the year before, at the Holy Trinity Church in Shanghai. Caroline was one of two children, and the eldest by ten years of her sister, Frances Maud Brady. Her father, the son of British emigrants, had been raised in Austin, Texas, and traveled as the army took him. His two brothers, John W. and Will P. Brady—Caroline Brady's uncles—both became prominent Texas attorneys and jurists. Will P. Brady worked as the first district attorney of Reeves County, Texas, and later as a judge of the county court in El Paso. John W. Brady rose to prominence within Austin, and Texas generally, as an assistant attorney general and judge, before killing his mistress in 1929 and being sentenced to three years in prison. Caroline Brady's mother, meanwhile, traced back through four generations of her matriline to Anthony Van Egmond (Caroline Brady's great-great-great-grandfather), an early settler of Canada, whose true identity as the Dutch fugitive Antonij Jacobi Willem Gijben—not, as he claimed, as a direct descent of the counts of Egmond—was not uncovered until the second half of the twentieth century.

In May 1910, when Brady was four, her family arrived in Los Angeles, California, via Shanghai, aboard the steamer Bessie Dollar. The ship carried only two families and a woman traveling alone, in addition to a cargo of pig iron, and had what the Los Angeles Herald described as "a rough voyage across the Pacific", striking a whale. By the end of the year, the family was living in British Columbia. Though the Herald had described Brady's father as a Standard Oil engineer, by the end of World War I he was serving overseas as part of the Rainbow Division of the United States Army National Guard, in France and Germany as first a captain and then a major. During these years, until about September 1919, Caroline Brady and her family stayed with her uncle, John W. Brady, in his large Austin house. David Brady returned in August or September 1919; by the following year he was working with his brother Will at the Los Angeles-based Sunshine Oil Corporation.

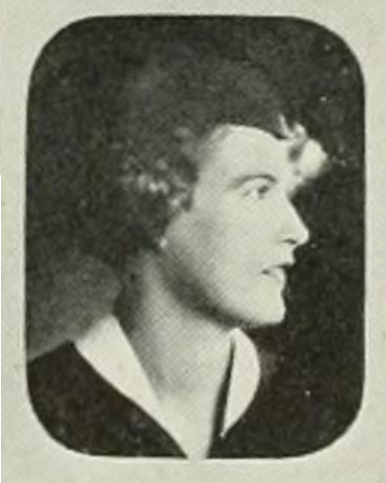
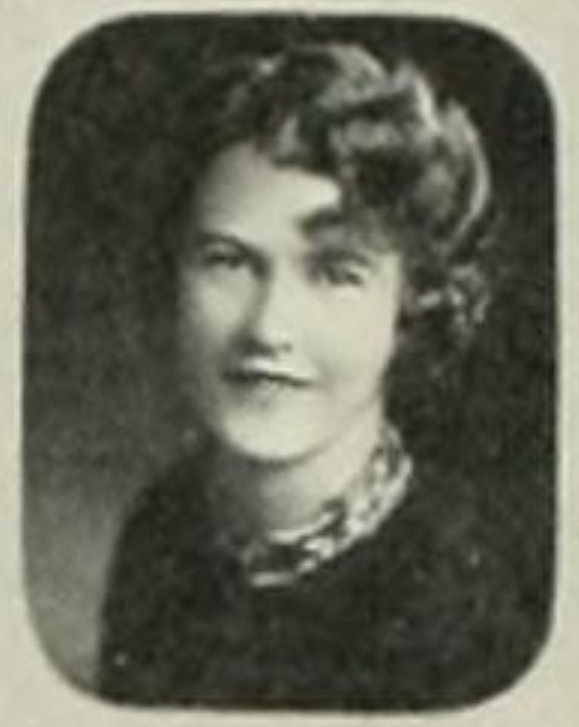
Photographs of Brady from her 1928 UCLA yearbook

In August 1924 Brady matriculated at the University of California at Los Angeles (UCLA), then known as the Southern Branch of the University of California. She entered Teachers College, for studies in kindergarten-primary education. Brady was active in a number of organizations at UCLA, including Beta Phi Alpha, the YWCA, and the Prytanean Society, of which she was president. She graduated with a Bachelor of Arts in English in 1928, and two years later, on May 15, 1930, received a Master of Arts from the school's Berkeley campus. That same year she began her Ph.D., also at Berkeley, and graduated in 1935, with the thesis The Legends of Ermanaric. Her dissertation committee was chaired by Arthur Gilchrist Brodeur, with whom Brady would coauthor an article five years later.

=== Name ===
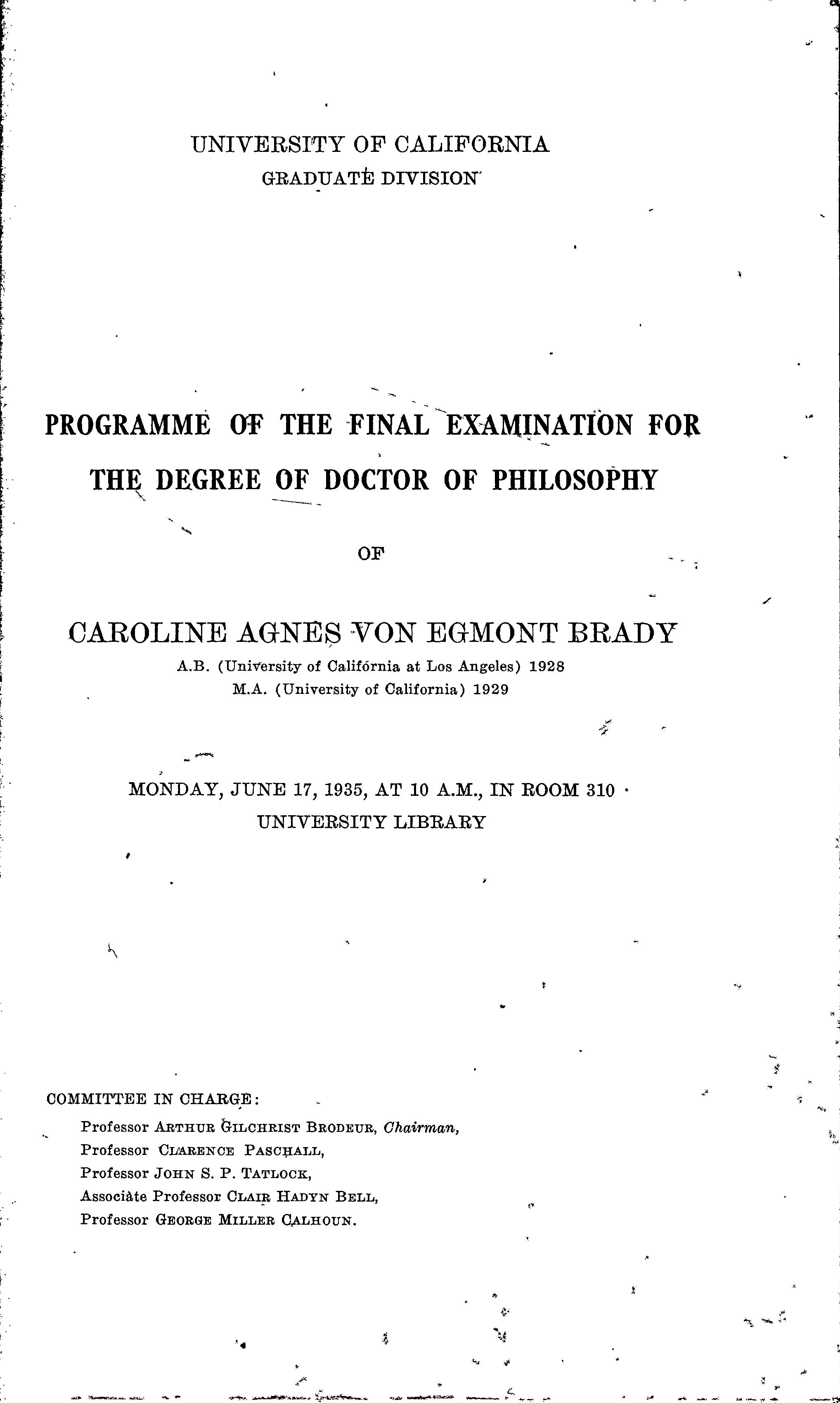
Programme of the Final Examination for the Degree of Doctor of Philosophy of Caroline Agnes von Egmont Brady (1935)

Brady is occasionally referred to as Caroline Agnes Von Egmont Brady. Though her published output universally refers to her as either "Caroline A. Brady" or "Caroline Brady", the program for her dissertation defense names her "Caroline Agnes Von Egmont Brady". Several library entries and membership lists of the Modern Language Association also use the longer name.

== Career ==
In 1935, the same year that she received her Ph.D., Brady became an English instructor at the College of Agriculture at the University of California. Brady was promoted on July 13, 1941, to assistant professor of languages and literature at the Berkeley campus. In 1943, her "completely rewritten" dissertation was published under the same title, The Legends of Ermanaric. Brady continued teaching at Berkeley until 1946. Thereafter, she taught for three years at the University of Pennsylvania as an assistant professor of English.

In 1949 Brady moved to Klamath Falls, Oregon, as one of the four inaugural instructors for the newly opened Central Oregon Community College. The college had campuses at both Bend and Klamath Falls; Brady taught at both, offering courses in English Composition and Survey of English Literature. After only a few months in the position, Brady resigned, citing "ill health".

By May 1952, Brady was working as the synonym editor for C. L. Barnhart, Inc., the publisher of Thorndike-Barnhart dictionaries, in Bronxville, New York. That year she was named the 1952–53 Marion Talbot Fellow of the American Association of University Women. (Note: In 1949 the organization had hosted a reception, which Brady attended, for students and faculty at the Central Oregon Community College.) The $2,200 fellowship was for "a study and reinterpretation of the substantial compounds and phrases in Old English poetry", looking at contextual word usage to "determine whether the various poets used them in exactly the same way". Brady's work was to take place at Johns Hopkins and Harvard, (Note: Brady was listed with a Cambridge, Massachusetts address in 1953. In his January 1955 review of her work "The Synonyms for 'Sea' in Beowulf", Adrien Bonjour noted that "Miss Brady has now been working for some time at Harvard—let us hope that she will soon publish more about the ways of the word in Beowulf." (This comment has been described as "a barely veiled and kind of underhanded jab" directed at Francis Peabody Magoun, "the obvious Harvard Anglo-Saxonist"). That November Brady reviewed one of Bonjour's works in turn.) and in 1952 she published two related articles: "The Synonyms for 'Sea' in Beowulf", and "The Old English Nominal Compounds in -rád".

Brady's subsequent activities are unclear. In 1979, she was listed again with a California address. That year, she published the second piece in her Beowulf trilogy, "'Weapons' in Beowulf." The final work in the trilogy, "'Warriors' in Beowulf," was published posthumously, in 1983.

== Personal life ==
In her 1941 Who's Who in California entry, Brady was described as a Democrat and an Episcopalian. Her father died in late January 1953, and her mother in November 1959. Caroline Brady died on November 5, 1980, in Bellevue, Washington. The year before she was listed with an address in Corona del Mar by Anglo-Saxon England, the journal that published her final two works. Brady's sister, by then Frances Brady Ackley, died on December 14, 1993; her obituary mentioned only cousins among her survivors.

== Publications ==
Brady's book The Legends of Ermanaric suggests the Gothic king Ermanaric, who ruled in the fourth century AD, was the subject of two competing traditions: one, in Ostrogothic lore, viewing him as a good king, and a second, promulgated by those subjugated by him, as evil. Brady's thesis gained less traction than her ability to investigate the intractable problems of Germanic myth, and the convoluted nature of the related scholarship. She was noted as "a broad and discriminating investigator", who had "a sovereign disregard of established opinion". Such disregard caused one reviewer to label Brady's work "more valuable in the sphere of criticism than construction," and another to note that her "conclusions are reached without reliance on the views of predecessors, and one may be sure that, in some quarters, the volume will be thoroughly combed for flaws to match those it has uncovered in the reasoning of others". Indeed, after Brady's "vigorous tilting with no less a scholar than Kemp Malone," he penned two separate reviews disparaging what he termed her scholastic immaturity, and suggesting "she overestimates the worth of debaters' points". (Note: Malone stated, for example, that "[t]he faults of this book, and of Miss Brady's papers in the same field, are those of immaturity. The author has not yet lived with the old texts long enough, and does not yet know them intimately well enough. Moreover, her judgment has not yet been sharpened by long experience in research, and she overestimates the worth of debaters' points.") Others shared concerns with Brady's thesis while being generally supportive, including the Old English scholar Philip W. Souers, who wrote that:

Her knowledge, from linguistics to archaeology, is great; her command of bibliography is sure; her acquaintance with languages shows the temper of a true scholar. ... It was worth doing, to try to establish a late Gothic legend that could be seen reflected in the Norse, to see where the results would lead. Others have always worked from the German sources. Though I cannot accept her hypothesis as proved, [the book] is without doubt one of the most important works in that difficult subject of heroic legend that has come from American scholarship in recent years.

Brady's 1979 and 1983 articles on the words used to describe weapons and warriors in the Anglo-Saxon poem Beowulf suggested that, unlike the interchangeability of words used for other subjects such as strong drink, the words used to describe weapons and warriors were precisely tailored to fit their specific contexts. Taken with her 1952 article "The Synonyms for 'Sea' in Beowulf", these are described by Katherine O'Brien O'Keeffe in A Beowulf Handbook as "three fundamental studies" that examine the context in which the Beowulf poet chose a word rather than simply the word itself. Brady concluded that "this poet is no artificer mechanically piling up synonyms and conventional metaphors, but an artist who knows how to use a variety of words and phrases". Her approach was considered "philological in the traditional sense" by O'Keeffe, and to have shed light on "the shades of meaning of the diction" used in the poem.

In addition to her book and the Beowulf articles, Brady published a number of other works during her career. She also presented several papers, including some which ultimately went unpublished, at academic conferences—notably at meetings of the Philological Association of the Pacific Coast and the Modern Language Association.

=== Books ===
- Brady, Caroline (September 1935). The Legends of Ermanaric (Ph.D. thesis). University of California Press, Berkeley.
- Brady, Caroline (1943). The Legends of Ermanaric. Berkeley: University of California. OCLC 878278262.

=== Articles ===
- Brady, Caroline (November 1933). "A Note on the Historical Prototype of Sigfried". Modern Philology. 31 (2). University of Chicago Press: 195–196. doi:10.1086/388087. JSTOR 433891. S2CID 162361312.
- Brady, Caroline (1937). The Eormanric of the Wīdsīð. University of California Publications in English. Vol. III. Berkeley: University of California Press.
- Brady, Caroline (April 1938). "Becca of the Banings". The Journal of English and Germanic Philology. XXXVII (2). University of Illinois Press: 169–188. JSTOR 27704379.
- Brady, Caroline (April 1939). "The Date and Metre of the Hamðismál". The Journal of English and Germanic Philology. XXXVIII (2). University of Illinois Press: 201–216. JSTOR 27704484.
- Brady, Caroline (October 1940). "Innweorud Earmanrices". Speculum. XV (4). University of Chicago Press: 454–459. doi:10.2307/2853463. JSTOR 2853463. S2CID 225090506.
- Brodeur, Arthur Gilchrist & Brady, Caroline (November 1940). "Sundrmœðri–Sammœðra". Scandinavian Studies and Notes. XVI (4). Society for the Advancement of Scandinavian Study: 133–137. JSTOR 40908177.
- Brady, Caroline (December 1940). "Óðinn and the Norse Jǫrmunrekkr-Legend". Publications of the Modern Language Association. LV (4). Modern Language Association: 910–930. doi:10.2307/458885. JSTOR 458885. S2CID 163229366.
- Brady, Caroline (1952a). "The Synonyms for "Sea" in Beowulf" (PDF). Studies in Honor of Albert Morey Sturtevant. Lawrence, Kansas: University of Kansas Press. pp. 22–46.
- Brady, Caroline (June 1952b). "The Old English Nominal Compounds in -rád". Publications of the Modern Language Association. LXVII (4). Modern Language Association: 538–571. doi:10.2307/459826. JSTOR 459826.
- Brady, Caroline (1979). "'Weapons' in Beowulf: an analysis of the nominal compounds and an evaluation of the poet's use of them". Anglo-Saxon England. 8. Cambridge University Press: 79–141. doi:10.1017/S0263675100003045.
- Brady, Caroline (1983). "'Warriors' in Beowulf: an analysis of the nominal compounds and an evaluation of the poet's use of them". Anglo-Saxon England. 11. Cambridge University Press: 199–246. doi:10.1017/S0263675100002611.
- Brady, Caroline. "Kings Frotho I-V: A Study in Saxo's Historical Method". Unpublished.

=== Reviews ===
- Brady, Caroline (January–June 1941). "The Orkneyinga Saga by Alexander Burt Taylor". The Journal of American Folklore. 54 (211–212). American Folklore Society: 90–92. doi:10.2307/535815. JSTOR 535815.
- Brady, Caroline (April 1951). "Walter of Aquitaine: Materials for the Study of His Legend by F. P. Magoun, Jr. & H. M. Smyser". Speculum. XXVI (2). University of Chicago Press: 397–401. doi:10.2307/2852428. JSTOR 2852428.
- Brady, Caroline (November 1955). "The Digressions in Beowulf. by Adrien Bonjour". Modern Language Notes. LXX (7). Johns Hopkins University Press: 521–524. doi:10.2307/3039650. JSTOR 3039650.

== Bibliography ==
- Bonjour, Adrien (January 1955). "On Sea Images in Beowulf". The Journal of English and Germanic Philology. LIV (1). University of Illinois Press: 111–115. JSTOR 27706524.
- "Contents". Anglo-Saxon England. 8. Cambridge University Press: v–vi. 1979. doi:10.1017/S0263675100002982.
- "Contents". Anglo-Saxon England. 11. Cambridge University Press: v–vi. 1983. doi:10.1017/S0263675100002519.
- "Fellowship Awards, 1952–53". Journal of the American Association of University Women. 45 (4). American Association of University Women: 225–230. May 1952. ISSN 0001-0278.
- Frank, Roberta (Summer 1987). "Did Anglo-Saxon Audiences have a Skaldic Tooth?". Scandinavian Studies. 59 (3). Society for the Advancement of Scandinavian Study: 338–355. JSTOR 40918869.
- Girvan, Ritchie (October 1944). "The Legends of Ermanaric by Caroline Brady". The Modern Language Review. XXXIX (4). Modern Humanities Research Association: 403–404. doi:10.2307/3716937. JSTOR 3716937.
- "List of Members of the Modern Language Association of America". Publications of the Modern Language Association. LXIVIII (4 (part 2, Supplement)). Modern Language Association: 68–169. September 1953. JSTOR 2698988.
- "List of Members of the Modern Language Association of America". Publications of the Modern Language Association. LVI (Supplement). Modern Language Association: 1417–1524. 1941. JSTOR 459009.
- Malone, Kemp (March 1944a). "The Legends of Ermanaric by Caroline Brady". Modern Language Notes. LIX (3). Johns Hopkins University Press: 183–185. JSTOR 2910880.
- Malone, Kemp (October 1944b). "The Legends of Ermanaric by Caroline Brady". The Journal of English and Germanic Philology. XLIII (4). University of Illinois Press: 449–453. JSTOR 27705152.
- Morgan, Lynn A., ed. (1984). Loyalist Lineages of Canada, 1783–1983. Vol. I. Agincourt, Toronto: Generation Press. ISBN 0-920830-24-2.
- O'Donoghue, Bernard (May 1986). "The Old English Elegies. New Essays in Criticism and Research by Martin Green". The Review of English Studies. XXXVII (146). Oxford University Press: 237–238. doi:10.1093/res/XXXVII.146.237. JSTOR 516977.
- O'Keeffe, Katherine O'Brien (November 1997). "Diction, Variation, the Formula". In Bjork, Robert E. & Niles, John D. (eds.). A Beowulf Handbook. Lincoln: University of Nebraska Press. pp. 85–104. ISBN 0-8032-1237-2.
- "Proceedings of the Sixty-Eighth Annual Meeting of the American Philological Association. Also of the Thirty-Eighth Annual Meeting of the Philological Association of the Pacific Coast". Transactions and Proceedings of the American Philological Association. LXVII. Johns Hopkins University Press: i–cxi. 1936. doi:10.2307/283247. JSTOR 283247.
- "Proceedings of Modern Language Association of America". Publications of the Modern Language Association. LIV (Supplement). Modern Language Association: 1356–1381. 1939. JSTOR 458756.
- Remein, Daniel (February 18, 2016). "Kinetic Beowulf". Harvard Medieval Colloquium. Working paper: 1–26.
- Rypins, Stanley (June 1945). "The Legends of Ermanaric by Caroline Brady". Modern Language Quarterly. VI (2). Johns Hopkins University Press: 225–226. doi:10.1215/00267929-6-2-225.
- Souers, Philip W. (October 1945). "The Legends of Ermanaric by Caroline Brady". Speculum. XX (4). The Mediaeval Academy of America: 502–507. doi:10.2307/2856754. JSTOR 2856754.
- Wahlgren, Erik (July 1944). "The Legends of Ermanaric by Caroline Brady". California Folklore Quarterly. III (3). Western States Folklore Society: 248–250. doi:10.2307/1495888. JSTOR 1495888.
- Wilson, Elane (1999). Skeats, Terry (ed.). Sherbrooke Daily Record: Vital Statistics. Vol. 2. North Hatley, Quebec: North Hatley Historical Society. ISBN 978-0-9682366-2-8.
