= Will P. Brady =

American lawyer (1876–1943)

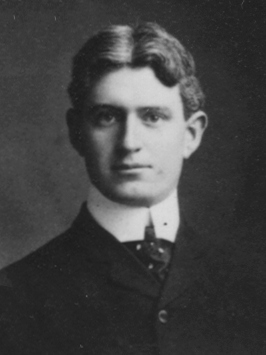
- In 1906, aged about 30

Travis County School Superintendent
- In office December 1, 1900 – November 30, 1904
- Preceded by: John E. Shelton
- Succeeded by: Carl Hartman

District Attorney for Texas's 70th Judicial District
- In office February 3, 1909 – c. 1914
- Nominated by: Thomas Mitchell Campbell

Judge for El Paso County Court at Law
- In office June 22, 1917 – October 3, 1919
- Nominated by: James E. Ferguson
- Succeeded by: James M. Deaver

Personal details
- Born: February 12, 1876 Austin, Texas, U.S.
- Died: February 27, 1943 (aged 67) San Luis Obispo, California, U.S.
- Party: Democratic
- Spouse: Mabel Rarey (m. 1911)
- Education: University of Texas (LLB)

William Paul Brady (February 12, 1876 – February 27, 1943) was an American lawyer. From 1909 to around 1914, he served as the first district attorney for Texas' 70th judicial district, and from 1917 to 1919 he was the judge for the newly created El Paso County Court at Law. Brady prosecuted several high-profile murder cases as a district attorney, including of Agnes Orner, and in a death-penalty case that has since been termed a "legal lynching" of a Mexican boy charged with killing a white woman.

Brady was born to a pioneering Austin family and grew up there. An older brother, John W. Brady, also became a Texas lawyer and judge; a niece, Caroline Brady, would go on to become a philologist. Will Brady spent three years after graduation as a county school teacher, then ran for county superintendent. He won and ultimately served two terms, from 1900 to 1904. Brady thereafter obtained a Bachelor of Laws from the University of Texas and moved to Pecos, where after several years in private practice he was appointed district attorney by Texas Governor Thomas Mitchell Campbell. Brady moved to El Paso in 1915 and resumed private practice, but was soon named judge, this time by Governor James E. Ferguson. Brady resigned in 1919 and moved to California to pursue interests in oil; he spent the remainder of his career as an oil attorney, and then with the National Farm Loan Association.

In Austin, Pecos, El Paso, and San Luis Obispo, Brady remained deeply involved in the social, political, and business milieu. The El Paso Herald described him as "one of the best known public men in west Texas". A Democrat, Brady spoke at and organized numerous gatherings and attended county and statewide conventions. A Catholic, he was involved in innumerable social functions, and at one point served as the state president of the Catholic Knights of America in Texas. Likewise, "for many years among the front ranks of our business men", as the Pecos Times put it, Brady incorporated both the Cruces Oil Corporation and the Pecos Valley Southern Railway.

== Early life and education ==
William Paul Brady was born on February 12, 1876, in Austin, Texas. His parents, James and Agnes Brady, were early settlers of the city, having arrived five years earlier. Will Brady was one of five children; his siblings were John W., David John, Agnes Margaret, and Helen Gertrude Brady. His brother John would also become a lawyer and judge, with a successful career upended by a three-year prison sentence for murder. Meanwhile, his niece Caroline Brady would go on to become a philologist.

Brady was raised in Austin and attended the public schools there. He graduated from Austin High School in 1895, although he had matriculated at the University of Texas a year earlier. He graduated from the university's College of Arts in 1896.

== Career ==
=== Education ===
Brady began teaching in Sprinkle, Texas, around 1897, where he led the country school. Term typically began around September or October, after the cotton crop had been gathered, and ended around June. While a teacher, Brady was involved with the Travis County Teachers' Association. At gatherings of the Association, he co-led discussions of a new text book law and of a paper entitled "School Law", and spoke on "Needed Changes in the School Law", "Truth v. Fiction in the School Reader", "How to Teach Texas History", and "Professional Courtesy". He also helped organize a circulating library intended to supply the teachers in the county with professional books, and in 1900 taught physical geography at the Elgin summer normal.

In 1900, his third year at Sprinkle, Brady ran for the position of Travis County school superintendent, (Note: Around the time of his announcement, Brady gave a presentation address at the Travis County Teachers' Association to the outgoing superintendent, John E. Shelton, and presented him with a bronze clock and silver-headed walking cane.) responsible for the rural, rather than city, schools in the county. An endorsement signed by three Sprinkle residents – W. B. Barr, T. J. Rowzee, and F. T. Maxwell – declared that Brady "is a young man, well educated, full of ambition, and will strive hard to build up a reputation for himself", and by the end of March Brady was making what the Austin Daily Statesman termed "an energetic canvass" for the position. Brady's opponent in the April primary was James H. Day, a school principal in Austin. The election was close, (Note: The Houston Daily Post reported that "it is impossible to tell tonight" who had won, though the Statesman claimed that Day likely would "be the winner by a fair majority".) but Brady won with 2,679 votes to 2,524. Brady won the November election uncontested, and was sworn in to begin his two-year term on December 1. Days before the election, Brady submitted an affidavit, read at a political gathering, accusing a district judge, Frank G. Morris, of summoning a grand jury to investigate a political opponent. The following year Brady took a three-week vacation that included stops in Buffalo and New York City.

As superintendent, Brady's duties included reviewing transfers and expulsions of students, as well as the hiring of instructors. This included teaching at summer normals in 1901, 1903, and 1904, grading papers from examinations for teachers' certificates, and even selecting instructors for the newly formed Girls' Industrial College in Denton. Brady remained involved in the teachers' Association, at times organizing its meetings, and giving talks on current events. He attended meetings of the Texas State Teachers Association as well, including one at which he co-led discussion of a paper titled "Should Schools with One Teacher be Limited as to Number of Grades?"

Brady ran for a second term in 1902. Penning a letter in the Statesman in support of his candidacy, he wrote that "[t]he city people pay very little attention to the county superintendent because he has nothing at all to do with the city schools, but in their choice they should be guided to a considerable extent by those directly connected with the county schools. There are eighty teachers and 225 trustees in this county, and as to my record in office I refer you to these people, who are almost unanimous in supporting me for re-election." Facing Day again in the June primary, Brady won by fewer than 100 votes; the Statesman described the race as "neck and neck", and initially recorded Day as leading. Brady won the November election uncontested. He ultimately served two terms as superintendent. His successor, Carl Hartman, was sworn in on December 1, 1904. The following day, Brady helped conduct a teachers' examination, arranged by Hartman, for positions in the public school. Brady also attended a meeting of the Teachers' Association on December 17, where he was presented with an umbrella in appreciation of his tenure.

=== Law ===
In the summer of 1904, Brady spent several weeks in Milwaukee with a G. W. Briggs, visiting the Louisiana Purchase Exposition in St. Louis around the same time. At the end of the year, while still officially superintendent, he matriculated at the University of Texas to study law. While at the university Brady was involved in committees related to the final ball, the auditing of expenses for the school yearbook, and celebrations for Texas Independence Day. Brady applied for admission to the bar in 1905 and graduated in 1906 with a Bachelor of Laws. In the month after graduation, Brady traveled to Texarkana, Texas, where he was the best man at the wedding of Roy Lee Walker, the quartermaster for the Confederate Home in Austin.

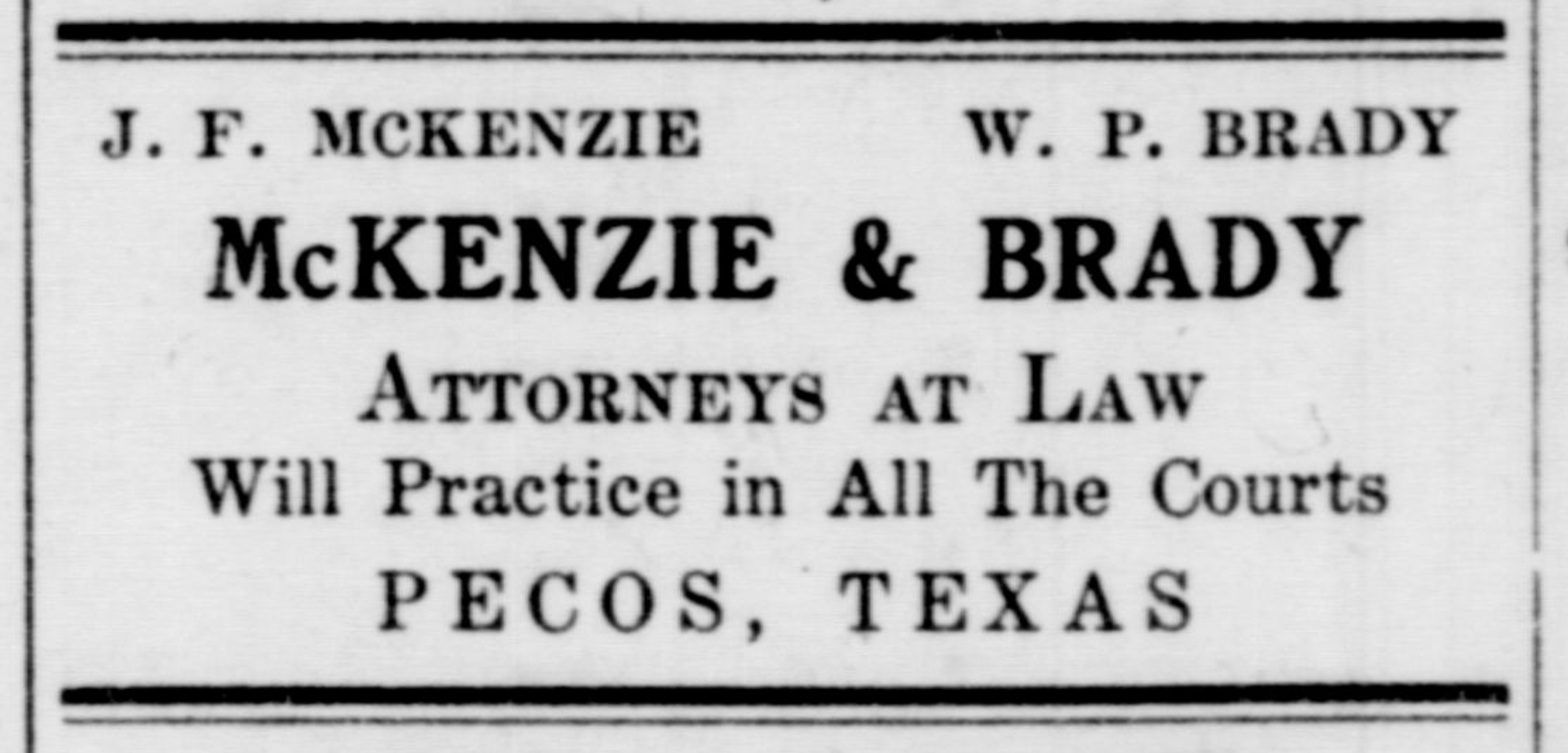
newspaper ad

After graduation Brady moved to Pecos, where he worked with James McKenzie, a member of the Texas House of Representatives. The firm, branded McKenzie & Brady, served both legal and real estate needs. It included an abstract office which claimed to have complete abstracts of all of Reeves, Loving, and Winkler counties.

=== District attorney ===
On February 3, 1909 Texas Governor Thomas Mitchell Campbell appointed Brady the district attorney of the newly created seventieth judicial district, covering Midland, Ector, Gaines, Glasscock, Reeves, Ward, Andrews, Crane, Loving, Winkler, and Upton counties. S. J. Isaacks, a Midland attorney, was named the district's judge.

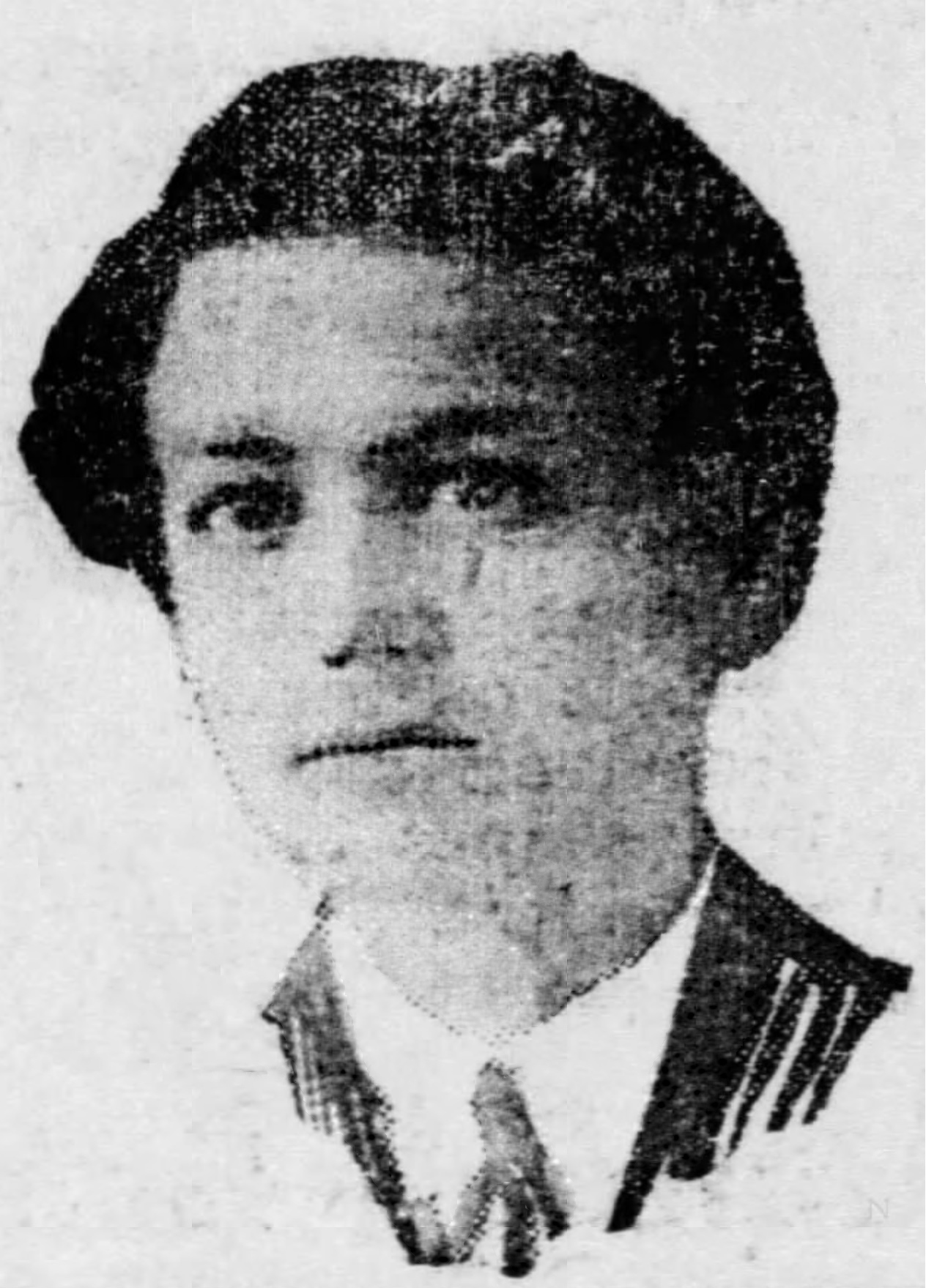
León Martínez Jr.

In 1911 Brady prosecuted León Martínez Jr., in a case that has since been termed a "legal lynching". On July 23, a 26-year-old woman, Emma Brown, was shot and stabbed while riding in a buggy. Martínez was arrested shortly thereafter, largely on the evidence that he had been seen speaking to Brown at the general store the day of the murder. Martínez, who was 15, confessed twice: once, when a posse promised not to hang him until the sheriff arrived if he confessed, and again, when the sheriff threatened to hand Martínez back to the posse if he did not confess. In the early morning of July 25, 1911, two days after the murder, Brady held up Martínez's written confession to the crowd gathered outside the jail.

On July 29, five days after Martínez's arrest, with Brady prosecuting, a guilty verdict and a death sentence were in hand. After the verdict, according to The Galveston Daily News, "hundreds" of people came up to Brady and Judge Isaacks to shake their hands "for their prompt attention to the case and their narrow avertence of a lynching". Isaacks scheduled the hanging for September 1. A petition, said to be signed by "nearly every person in Reeves County", was sent to Governor Oscar Branch Colquitt asking him to not grant clemency, and Brady himself met with Colquitt in August for the same purpose. National and international concern, as well as appeals, including an unsuccessful appeal to the Supreme Court dismissed for lack of jurisdiction, nonetheless pushed the case into 1914, when Martínez was hanged. During these proceedings, Brady was said by the El Paso Herald to be "active in pushing the case ... towards a carrying out of the judgment of the district court, calling for hanging, as strongly as he knows how."

In 1912 Brady tried another high-profile murder case, this time of Agnes Orner, who was charged with poisoning her eleven-year-old daughter in El Paso. Orner had already been tried twice; her first trial resulted in a conviction and life sentence that was subsequently reversed, and her second ended in a mistrial. Despite Brady's efforts, Orner's third trial also resulted in a mistrial, with eight jurors favoring acquittal and four conviction. Orner was finally convicted on the sixth try, then pardoned after serving five years in prison.

In January 1913 the position of county judge for Reeves became vacant with the death of John Y. Leavell. Brady was one of four applicants for the position, which was filled by vote of three county commissioners, but lost to Hector McKellar, until then the district and county clerk. (Note: The other two applicants were Harry MacTier and F. P. Richberg.) In May Brady prosecuted W. J. Hiles for the murder of Tom Tucker, a Reeves county commissioner who, Hiles claimed, had attempted to assault Hiles's wife. Hiles was convicted of manslaughter, and given the lowest possible sentence of two years. (Note: The conviction was reversed on appeal the following year. Hiles was again convicted of manslaughter in 1915, and the verdict sustained.) Immediately after the conviction Brady began prosecuting another murder case, this time of James L. Wright, who was charged with shooting his Pecos neighbor C. C. Steed. The case was tried in Midland County due to a change in venue; (Note: Accordingly, Brady tried the case alongside Earl Anderson, the county attorney for Midland County, who later became assistant state's attorney general in Arizona.) Judge Isaacks went as far as to coordinate a special train run by the Pecos Valley Southern Railway to gather further potential jurors, but after examining 176, was able to seat only eight. Wright was convicted in September, and sentenced to 30 years in prison. The case was "particularly remarkable", the Herald wrote, as the first murder case tried in Midland County in which a white man was convicted. (Note: The case was affirmed on appeal the following year. Wright was ultimately pardoned on August 18, 1920.)

Brady remained the district attorney into at least February 1914, when he extracted a confession from Fernando Subia to shooting and killing city marshal T. Y. Moorehead. Brady testified at the trial, held that month, which resulted in a conviction and death sentence; Subia's sentence was later commuted to life. Newspapers compared the case of Subia, another Mexican accused of killing a white person, to that of León Martinez, and before Subia's commutation, the two were held in adjoining cells and scheduled to be hanged the same month; on his way to the gallows, Martinez gave his loose change to Subia.

=== County judge ===
Brady moved to El Paso in 1915. He joined the law firm of Stafford and Mahan, which renamed itself Stafford, Brady & Mahan and moved its offices to the First National Bank building. (Note: Brady may have been the "W. P. Brady" who, in August 1916, withdrew from a criminal-assault case during a preliminary hearing, after hearing the testimony of the twelve-year-old accuser and discovering that his client was wanted in California on a similar charge. The client, William Dayton, ended up being sentenced to ten years in prison following an initial mistrial.) In 1917 the El Paso County Court at Law was created, and Brady was chosen by Governor James E. Ferguson from among three candidates for the judgeship. (Note: The other candidates were Peyton Forbes Edwards, formerly a district judge and member of the Texas House of Representatives, and Charles H. Veale, at one point an assistant district attorney.) The court had jurisdiction over civil and criminal matters; the preexisting County Court of El Paso County retained jurisdiction as a juvenile and probate court, among other matters. (Note: Brady's was a recess appointment, made in June but submitted to the Texas Senate in August; although the Senate approved the nomination, Brady saw a brief period of uncertainty when litigation arising out of the governor's appointments suggested that a valid appointment under the circumstances could be made only by the county commissioners. The commissioners thus called a special session in October, four months after Brady's original appointment, and reappointed him to ensure he was validly installed.) Brady inherited a $2,500 salary (equivalent to $80,000 in 2025) and a voluminous docket, with some 3,000 civil and 800 criminal cases pending. The first session of the court lasted the first four weeks of July, and saw numerous cases: among them for selling intoxicating liquors – Brady's first jury case as a judge – false imprisonment, carrying a pistol, nonsupport, stealing lumber, and negligent homicide. (Note: Among those cases reported in the newspapers, A. Limantia, proprietor of the Borderland inn, was sentenced to 20 days in jail and fined $200 for selling intoxicating liquors and running "a place where women of bad character were permitted to visit". Carlos A. Aguero was convicted of false imprisonment, given 30 days in jail, and fined $100. Arturo Lopez pleaded guilty to obtaining $15 under false pretense, and was sentenced to six months imprisonment. Jose Gomez was sentenced to 30 days in jail for carrying a pistol. Victor Molina was sentenced to 30 days in jail for nonsupport. Henry Mailander was sentenced to 60 days in jail for negligent homicide, after he struck G. W. Loyd, causing him to fell from a window. T. Lopez was sentenced to 70 days in jail for stealing lumber. E. M. Thorethirst was fined $25 for vagrancy. C. E. James was found not guilty of swindling money from E. Gamotz. Sebe Hendrix was sentenced to six months for stealing goods. The jury for O. Huggins, a porter charged with stealing $55, was unable to reach a verdict. C. H. Tuckwood and his wife were found not guilty of swindling. J. B. Walker was fined $5 for assaulting A. A. Howard.) Brady was given two weeks vacation by the county commissioners at the end, spending it at Cloudcroft, New Mexico; he placed his newly built home to let until September, when the fall term convened. The new docket included some 50 liquor cases. (Note: Cases included those against D. Eduarte, who was sentenced to 30 days and fined $25 for aggravated assault; Cesario Terrazes, given five months and a $25 fine for impersonating an officer; Jesus Villalobos, sentenced to five months for theft; A. Marujo and Jose Rochin, each fined $25 for unlawfully selling liquor; Joe Fillecia, sentenced to 100 days in jail for theft; Cipriano Diaz, given 18 months in jail for theft; S. Diaz, fined $1 for rudely displaying a pistol; Richard Armendariz, owner of the Bohemian Club, sentenced to 20 days in jail and fined $200 for illegally selling liquor; John Gilard, sentenced $20 for using abusive language; L. R. Pratt, sentenced to a day in jail and fined $5 for theft under $50; F. Lopez, fined $20 for vagrancy; George Reed, found not guilty of carrying a pistol; W. L. Tuley ($25), Marshall Jackson ($10), J. M. Ornelas ($5), E. Rubio ($5), and J. Duran ($5), each of whom pleaded guilty to and was fined for liquor infractions; J. G. Henderson, sentenced to 20 days in jail and fined $200 for conducting a disorderly house; J. M. Duran, who was convicted and fined $75 for allowing music in his saloon; George Robinette, sentenced to a day in jail and fined $25 for stealing brass from the Southwestern Portland Cement plant; James E. M. and Olga Osborn, charged with aggravated assault; Moria M. Howe, fined $10 for pricking a city detective with a hatpin; Jose Garcia, sentenced to a day in jail and fined $5 for petty theft; R. L. Higgins, found not guilty of theft under $50; J. I. Broyles, fined $25 for vagrancy; Edward Ruff, fined $50 for aggravated assault; G. W. Kitchens, who forfeited a $500 bond for failure to appear on charges of aggravated assault; and M. A. Pagana and J. L. Queseda, each fined $25 for vagrancy. In another case, Brady considered a habeas corpus petition filed by O. H. Strahl, who was jailed and fined $100 for "calling the president vile names" and wishing for American troops to be "blown to hell when they landed in France". Meanwhile, Brady ordered $200 bonds forfeited for nonappearance for each of Antonio Morales, J. Smith, and J. E. Lane, charged with carrying a pistol, conducting a raffle, and swindle, respectively, and Brady ordered Jose Taranga's $1 fine for theft remitted, in order that Taranga could join the U.S. military.) Brady also heard cases in November and December 1917. (Note: These cases included a test case brought by the Western Indemnity company, claiming jitney drivers were unable to terminate surety contracts early. Brady's cases also included those of William Newton, found guilty by a jury for assault and fined $50, vagrancy cases against Gladys Johnson, Helen Johnson, Grace Shelby, Edna Smith, Beatrice King, Lillian Winns, and May White (each resulted in a guilty plea and $5 fine) and bond forfeitures for Mrs. C. H. Newman (vagrancy), H. H. Sweeney (drunkenness), and Alberto Hernandez (abusive language). Among those found not guilty of their charges were Annie McCoy, for selling liquor without a license; L. W. Hoffecker, for aggravated assault; and Anastacio Gamboa, for impersonating an officer. Brady also handled, and reversed, a $25 fine to Lewis Samuels for a traffic violation, imposed by the lower court a day before the complaint was actually filed.)

Brady was up for election in 1918, the first time his office would appear on the ballot. During the race he voiced his support for prohibition, and took out a half-page newspaper advertisement, along with county attorney William H. Fryer and judge Walter D. Howe of the thirty-fourth judicial district, calling it a lie to declare that licensed liquor dealers were uniformly law abiding. Brady introduced Fryer, county judge Edward B. McClintock, judge Dan M. Jackson, and Tom Lea at one event, and at another appeared in support of Texas representative R. Ewing Thomason, a Democrat. Though he spent at least $430 (equivalent to $9,200 in 2025) campaigning, Brady appeared unopposed on the primary ballot – part of an engineering feat by the local Democratic Party, which aimed to reduce distractions by lining up the ticket ahead of time and supporting existing officeholders.

Meanwhile, Brady continued hearing cases throughout 1918. Early into the January 1918 term, in a case which the El Paso Herald declared attracted "great interest", Anna Reum was convicted of practicing medicine without a license, fined $250, and sentenced to three months in the county jail; (Note: Reum had moved to El Paso around 1900 with her husband Charles, also a physician. In May 1902 Charles Reum was charged with practicing medicine without a license, while his wife was tried twice for performing an abortion; the first trial ended in a hung jury, and the second in an acquittal. In June 1905 Anna Reum was again charged with performing an abortion, and this time convicted and sentenced to two years in prison. The case was affirmed on appeal in December, but Reum was pardoned by Governor S. W. T. Lanham in January. Both Reums were charged with practicing medicine without a license in 1908, and in 1909 Anna Reum was acquitted of the same charge. Charles Reum was arrested in June 1917 after his stepson called officers to the home and, upon the door to Reum's room being broken down, Reum slashed his stepson with a knife. The El Paso Herald reported that charges of assault to murder, and insanity, were levied against Reum. Charles Reum was again arrested in 1919, pleaded guilty to violating the Harrison Narcotics Tax Act by administering narcotics, and was sentenced to a year and a day in the Leavenworth federal prison in Kansas. The following month the district attorney filed a suit to cancel Charles Reum's medical license.) the conviction was later reversed due to a legal error by Brady. (Note: Other cases in January included those of George Coleman, sentenced to six months for theft; C. W. Alexander, sentenced to four months for theft; A. Ledesma, sentenced to four months for theft; Joe Duran, sentenced to four months for theft; A. Martinez and A. Garcia, transferred to juvenile court for theft; John Doe Ferguson, fined $25 for assault; and L. Munoz, fined $5 for assault.) Brady spent part of the first week of February in Pecos, where he served as special judge for a trial. (Note: The Bar Association elected William Pelphrey, who was soon to become county attorney, to take Brady's place in the interim.) He returned in time to oversee a second trial for Reum, who had been rearrested on the same charges while Brady was away; this time she was fined $100 and sentenced to 15 days in jail.

In March 1918 the Texas Legislature passed a bill, introduced by Thomason, giving the El Paso County Court at Law and the County Court of El Paso County concurrent jurisdiction over criminal matters. The bill was intended to make the operation of the courts more efficient, with the County Court hearing criminal cases when the County Court at Law was busy. Brady thus continued presiding over some criminal matters, including a March trial in which a police surgeon, John A. Hardy, was found not guilty of hitting a hotel proprietor with a pistol. (Note: That same month Brady threw out 50 cases for having been improperly perfected; most read "to the county court" rather than "to the county court at law". Other cases that year included against F. Zozoya for unlawfully operating an automobile, H. E. King for speeding, and Jose Queseda for keeping a disorderly house.) In another case, he certified arrest warrants against Theodore Combest and John Martin, respectively the sheriff and county attorney of Cottle County, for conspiring to murder the star witness in an ongoing murder trial. By September, however, following a visit to Los Angeles, he and McClintock agreed that Brady would handle civil matters and McClintock criminal; in such a case heard that month, Brady issued a directed verdict in a lawsuit over possession of real property. Brady shut his courtroom during the second week of October, as did all state and federal judges in El Paso, in an effort to slow the spread of the Spanish flu. In December he denied a writ of habeas corpus to Charles Holman, who, at his trial for traffic violations, was held in contempt and ordered confined for 24 hours for using the word "damn" in the courtroom. Brady also had an active docket in June 1919, with at least nine jury trials.

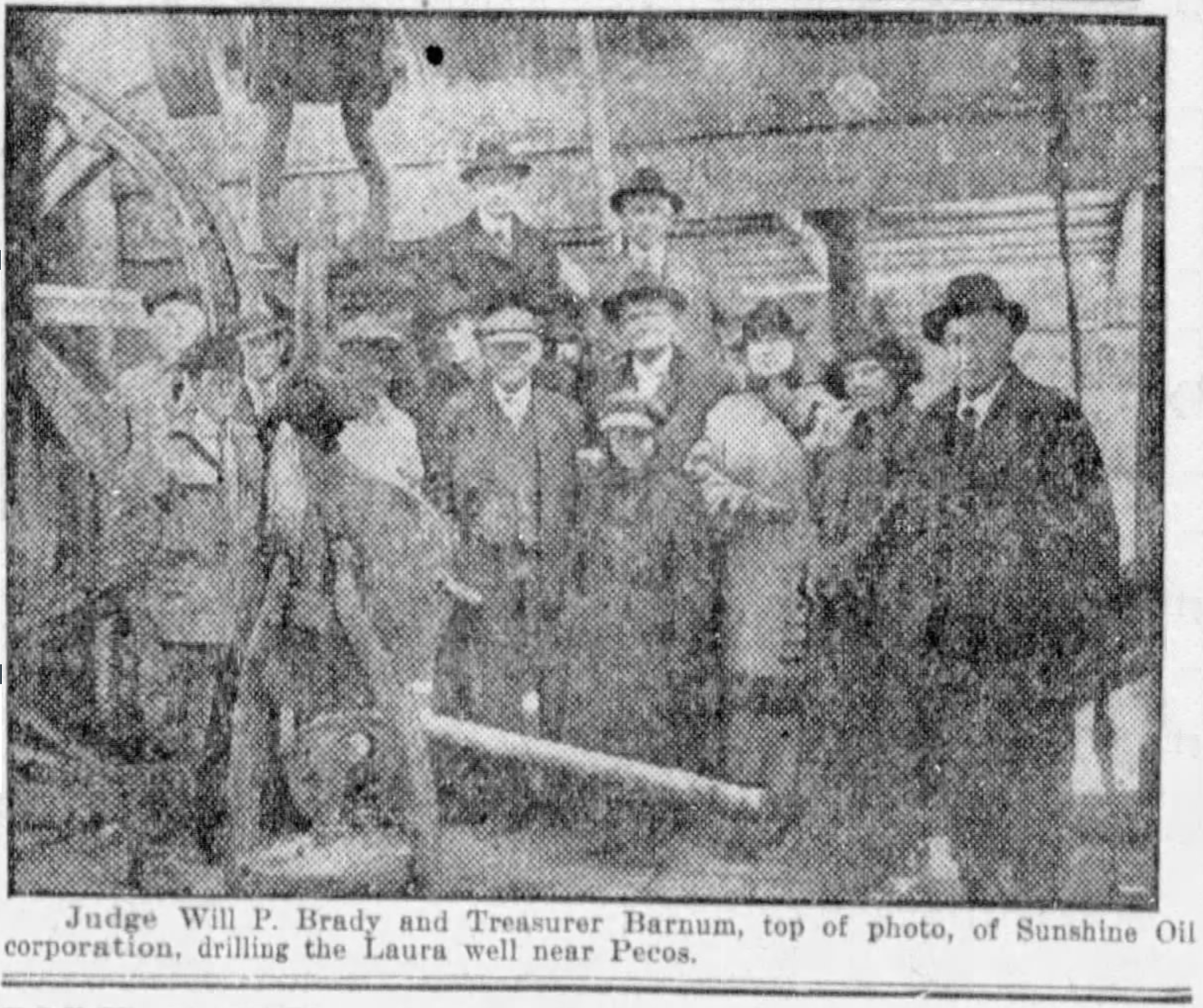

=== Oil ===
In early 1919 Brady visited Pecos, where he still owned land; upon his return, he told the Herald that all indications suggested oil and gas would be found there. On June 9, 1919, Brady was one of the incorporators of the Cruces Oil Corporation in New Mexico. Toward the middle of the year he began spending time in California, with his wife and children relocating for the summer. Beginning with the July term, temporary judges, including J. G. Highnote and Edgar Williams, were named to take his place. Brady sold his house for $5,000 in August, returned to El Paso on Monday, September 29, and resigned his judgeship that Friday, in order to take a position in Los Angeles with the Sunshine Oil Corporation, a partner of the Cruces Oil Corporation. (Note: The county commissioners chose James M. Deaver, previously a justice of the peace, to succeed Brady; Breedlove Smith, the son of William Robert Smith, was in turn named to Deaver's position. Breedlove Smith had also been mentioned as a possible replacement for Brady, as were J. A. Gillett, Edgar Williams, and Peyton Forbes Edwards.) Brady worked as an attorney and director for the company, and was eventually joined there by his brother David. Within weeks, Will Brady and Sunshine were advertising leases in the Pecos Valley oil field in California papers, stating that the Laura well in Pecos was "expected to come in with big flow of oil any time".

By November 1919 the Sunshine Oil Corporation claimed 170,000 acres of oil rights, mostly in the Pecos valley, although it held some interests in the Montebello oil fields in California, and in Big Spring, Texas. It had at least three wells in various stages of drilling, including the Laura well, and in Ward County the Victory and Leeman wells. The company claimed to have raised some $80,000 from the sales of its leases.

Brady was admitted to the California bar in 1925, and soon thereafter represented the Rhoads Oil Producing Company in a lawsuit against the oil producer Barnett Rosenberg; Rhoads claimed damages of $100,000, relating to Rosenberg's abandonment of five wells in Huntington Beach. By 1929, Brady was the secretary of the M. K. & T. Oil Company in Ventura, California. (Note: That year Brady also attended, as an observer, a Ventura trial over disputed title to oil-rich land.) At points in his career Brady also served as an agent for the National Petroleum Finance Corporation, and worked in Santa Barbara as an oil attorney.

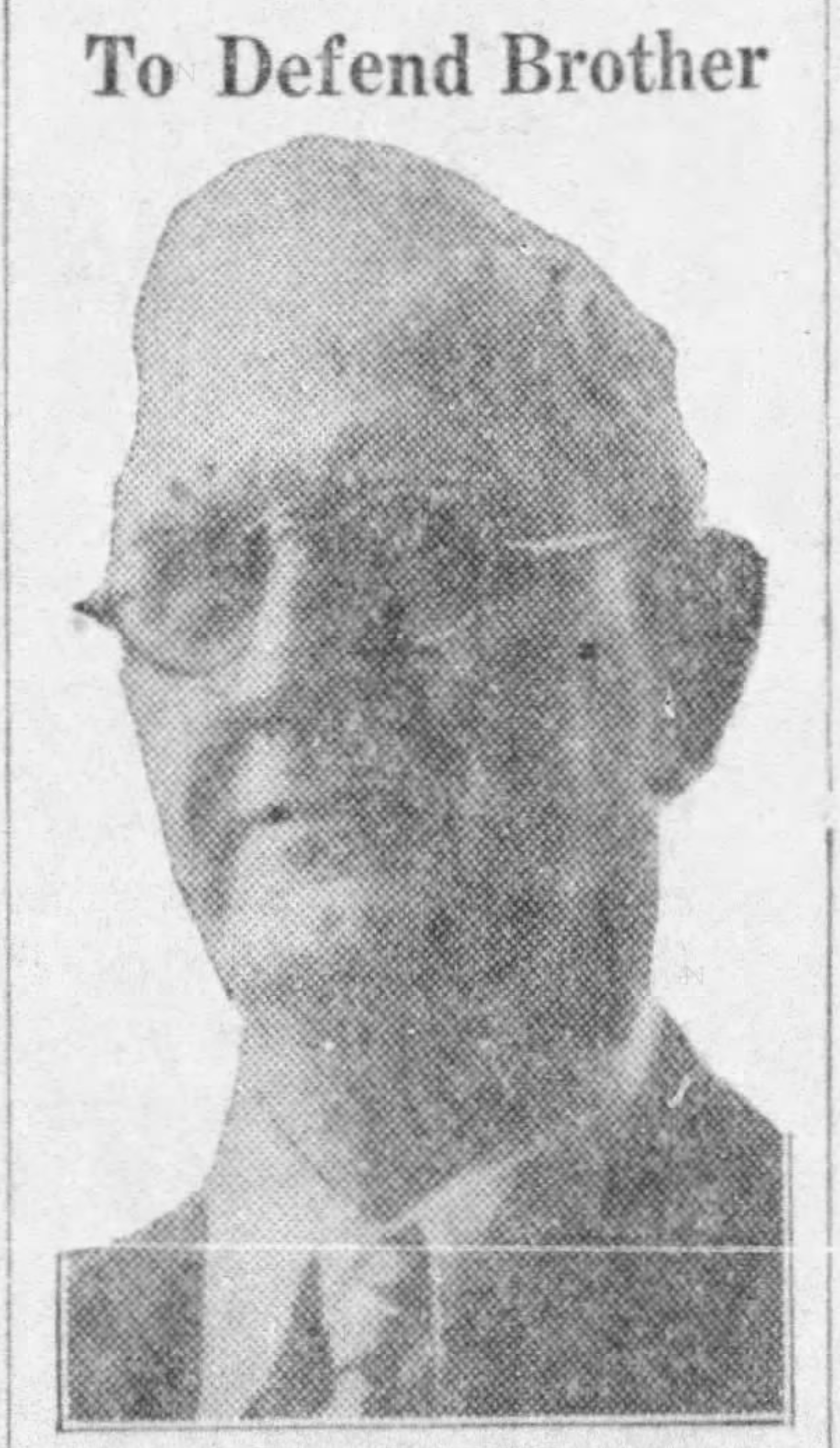
1929 photograph of Brady published in The Austin American

In November 1929 Brady's brother John was arrested and tried for drunkenly murdering his mistress in Austin. Brady headed there from California the following day, the first time in four years he had seen his brother. His wife and sister Helen were also present in the courtroom. Brady joined a team of nine lawyers participating in John Brady's defense; with four of the lawyers leading the defense, Brady and the four others served in a more advisory role. Brady suffered a heart attack in early May 1930, and was confined to his hotel room for several days. He was nonetheless present on May 20, when his brother was convicted and sentenced to three years in prison.

In 1931 federal judge William P. James appointed Brady the receiver for the Yalemont Oil Company, which operated near Santa Barbara.

=== Later years ===
Brady moved to Creston around 1931. By 1934 he was serving as the secretary-treasurer of the San Luis Obispo County branch of the National Farm Loan Association. The organization was one of several efforts to provide greater financial relief to the agricultural industry, particularly through loans to farmers, and involved coordination with the Federal Land Bank Association. Brady held the position through at least 1936, eventually retiring due to ill health.

== Politics ==
Brady was an avowed Democrat, and active in local and state politics. In Austin during the 1904 presidential election, he was appointed a Travis County delegate to the state Democratic convention in San Antonio. Likewise, during the 1908 presidential election which followed his move to Pecos, Brady was appointed as a Reeves County delegate to the state Democratic convention, and president of a Bryan-Kern club.

In El Paso by 1916, Brady was the chairman of the county Democratic executive committee, and the secretary of the Ferguson Democratic Club supporting Governor Ferguson's reelection campaign. That year Brady endorsed Alfred John Harper for a second term as a judge for the Texas Court of Criminal Appeals, and attended the state Democratic convention in Houston. In early 1917 he ran for re-election to the executive committee in the city primary, winning and setting up a race in the general election in April; Brady ultimately kept his position on the committee until assuming his judgeship, which disqualified him from the former role. Later in 1917, Brady helped organize a luncheon honoring state senator Claude Benton Hudspeth. The following year, in the days leading up to the July 27 primary in which Brady was also a candidate, he attended a lunch supporting the candidacy of Adrian Pool for the state legislature, reaffirmed his support for Hudspeth, and chaired a political meeting where county attorney Fryer spoke out against illegal bars. He also served as a delegate to the state convention in Waco.

Following his move to California, Brady served as the local manager for the campaign of Franklin D. Roosevelt and John Nance Garner for the 1932 presidential election, working under the direction of the San Luis Obispo County Democratic Central Committee and the campaign headquarters in Los Angeles. Brady was in charge of the San Luis Obispo headquarters on Monterey Street, and worked to set up affiliate clubs throughout the county, such as in Oceano, Pismo Beach, and Arroyo Grande. He remained a member of the Central Committee after the election. He spent only a short time in Creston, moving to San Luis Obispo thereafter; he was living there by 1933, when the Central Committee endorsed him for a position as assistant United States attorney for the Southern District of California. The same year he campaigned for Proposition 4, which would make certain not-for-profit educational institutions tax-exempt, visiting the offices of the Pismo Times and penning a half-page article in its pages about the cause. He also assisted the Home Owners' Loan Corporation's federal appraiser for San Luis Obispo, William C. O'Donnell – appointed through the recommendation of the Central Committee, as channeled through Congressman Henry E. Stubbs – in helping others acquire home loans. The next year Stubbs appointed him to the state Democratic Central Committee. In 1936 he was appointed chairman of the local finance division of the Democratic National Committee, and designated local chairman of the "Roosevelt nominators", supporting Roosevelt's re-election campaign.

== Business ==
According to the Pecos Times, Brady was "for many years among the front ranks of our business men in the boosting of Pecos and could always be relied upon for the bettering of the community". In 1909 he, along with Ernest D. Balcom, C. W. Griffin, H. Roddins, and Brady's former colleague McKenzie, was one of the incorporators of the Pecos Valley Southern Railway. The railroad was intended to connect Pecos with Presidio, 150 miles to the south, but settled for a terminus at Toyahvale when funds ran dry. Opening in 1910, the railroad offered farmers a faster route to market, and passengers a smoother and less dusty passage.

In 1911 Brady again helped bring a railroad to Pecos. On behalf of the city, he and nine others signed a contract with M. J. Healy of the Panhandle, Pecos & Gulf railway of Texas, to build a railway from Texico or Tucumcari to Knowles, all in New Mexico, and then to Pecos. (Note: The others were F. W. Johnson, J. G. Love, J. W. Moore, R. S. Johnson, T. Y. Casey, Sam Prewitt, W. A. Hudson, A. H. Phillips, and Jas. Goode.)

== Social life ==
The El Paso Herald described Brady as "one of the best known public men in west Texas", and the El Paso Times termed him "our popular district attorney". Brady was involved in various organizations in Austin and then Pecos, including as a quartermaster sergeant of the Austin Rifles, member of the YMCA, manager of the Pecos baseball team, and president of the fire department for 1911, 1912, and 1913. In 1902 he was elected a delegate to the Catholic Knights of America convention in Waco, and at the Galveston convention in 1904, was elected vice president. By 1906 he was the acting state president of the organization, and presided over the convention in Corpus Christi, where he was elected president; he had traveled there with his father. Meanwhile, Brady was involved in local activities of the Knights, such as its annual picnic. Brady was likewise a founding member of the Knights of Columbus in Austin, served as a delegate to a 1911 Knights of Pythias district meeting in El Paso, and helped organize the Pecos Society of United Charities.

Brady also served as the vice president of the Pecos Commercial Club. In this capacity he met with members of the Gould and Texas & Pacific railway lines, attended the Conservation Association of Texas congress as a delegate, and recommended a $200,000 good-roads bond issue for Reeves County. The club placed Brady in charge of a committee to raise money and provide management for the first annual fair and barbeque in Pecos, held in September 1911. Named the "Pecos Fair, Barbeque and Old Settlers' Reunion", the fair invited visitors from west Texas and New Mexico. The Herald declared the fair "an unqualified success" with crowds of more than 1,375 one time and 5,000 total, and wrote that congratulations were "being poured upon general manager Will P. Brady". The success led to the creation of the Reeves County Fair Association, with Brady president, which planned to purchase 40 acres of land and erect permanent structures to permit an annual fair. Brady subsequently helped raise $6,000 for the construction of the 1912 fair, held in October, and remained a director for the 1913 and 1914 fairs.

Following his 1915 move to El Paso, Brady remained involved in the social life of his home. That year he attended banquets thrown by the Chamber of Commerce for Senator Morris Sheppard, and by the Knights of Columbus (of which Brady remained a member) for Bishop Anthony Joseph Schuler, both at the Hotel Paso del Norte. Brady escorted Sheppard during part of his time in El Paso, and stood on stage during the senator's speech on "Christian Civilization and Fraternalism". Afterwards, he suggested that Sheppard's role on the Committee on Military Affairs could help secure a brigade post in the city. By 1916 he was an organizer of a local University of Texas alumni group, and a member of the El Paso County Bar Association. In October Brady became a charter member of "The Tri-State Bar Association", an organization of lawyers from Arizona, New Mexico, and Texas. With the American entry into World War I in 1917, Brady purchased $100 of Liberty bonds from Judge McClintock, and urged others to do the same; he also installed a flag above his courtroom chair as a statement of patriotism. During 1917 and 1918, he and other members of the local bar assisted those filling out draft questionnaires. In early 1918 Brady chaperoned the Liberty Club dance with his wife, sister, and sister's husband, then helped organize the third annual dinner of the local Ex-Students' Association of the University of Texas, with a talk by Robert Ernest Vinson. In September he helped advertise a talk by Louis F. Post, and, again at a Knights of Columbus event with Bishop Schuler – this time held at Fort Bliss – presided and introduced the bishop.

In San Luis Obispo, Brady was involved in activities with the Old Mission Parish. This included, in 1933, serving as the secretary for the mission's annual autumn festival. In 1936 and 1937 he helped coordinate the annual Fiesta de las Flores, used to raise funds to restore the mission.

== Personal life ==
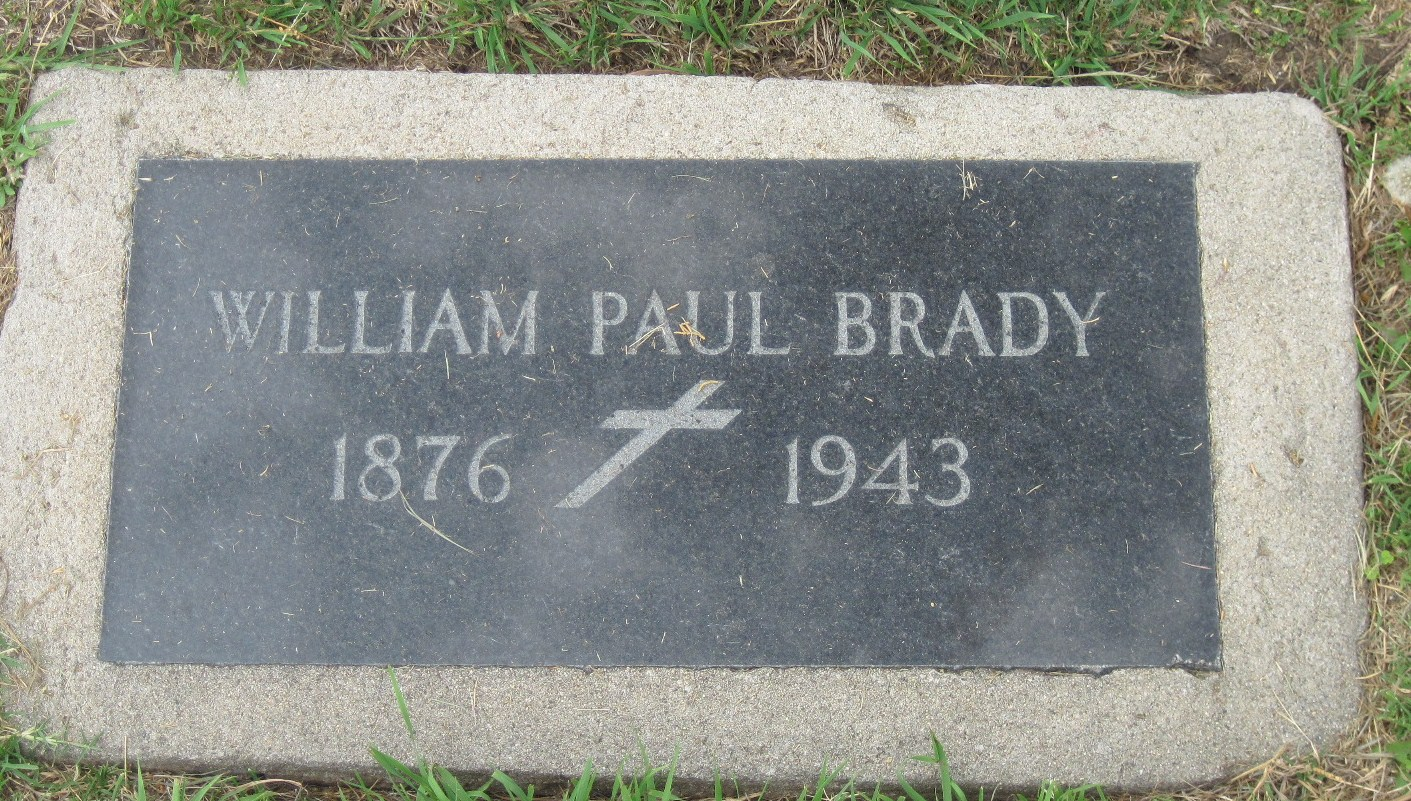
Brady's grave in San Luis Obispo

Brady married Mabel Rarey on November 30, 1911, at St. Nicholas Church in Carlsbad, New Mexico. Rarey was from Carlsbad, having moved there with her parents while young. Over the three years preceding her marriage she had spent time in New York and other northern states, as well as Pecos, where she met Brady. The two returned to Pecos on December 1, and were promptly thrown a banquet by the newly formed Pecos Bar Association. (Note: By 1912 the organization was known as the Reeves County Bar Association; Brady spoke at that year's banquet.) The two visited Brady's family in Austin over the holidays, and planned to travel through the South and visit Brady's relatives in Arizona once the term of the criminal court ended.

Brady and his wife, with a baby in tow, spent two weeks in Carlsbad with her parents in November 1914, then spent Christmas with Brady's family in El Paso, at his sister Helen's house on Montana Street. Brady and his sister's husband, Dan White, had the year before sold a tract of land at Ochoa and River streets to James Brady, for $2,000. Soon after moving to El Paso in 1915, Will Brady took a home on Fort Boulevard, then purchased two lots of land along Grant Avenue and Rosewood Street – half an hour by streetcar from the courthouse – for $1,500, with plans to build a modern residence; he ended up contracting for a five-room bungalow costing $3,500.

After being in ill health for some time, Brady died on February 27, 1943, in San Luis Obispo, where he is buried. His wife died in June 1951, in Los Angeles. At their deaths they had four surviving children: Helen Jane and Catherine Marie Brady of San Luis Obispo, Sister Elizabeth Marie Brady of San Bernardino, and Master Sgt. James William Brady, stationed at Hobbs Army Airfield in New Mexico.

== Bibliography ==
- "Courts – Reorganizing". General Laws of the State of Texas Passed by the Thirty-First Legislature at its Regular Session Convened January 12, 1909, and Adjourned March 13, 1909 at its First Called Session Convened March 13, 1909, and Adjourned April 11, 1909 and at its Second Called Session Convened April 12, 1909, and Adjourned May 11, 1909. The Laws of Texas, 1822–1909. Vol. 14. Austin, Texas: Gammel Book Company. 1909. pp. 10–12.
- "El Paso County Court at Law". Supplement to Vernon's Texas Civil and Criminal Statutes: Embracing All Laws of General Application Passed at the Second and Third Called Sessions of the 33d and the Regular and Called Sessions of the 34th and 35th Legislatures, Except Such of the Laws as Were Carried into Vernon's Criminal Statutes of 1916. Vol. 1. Kansas City, Missouri: Vernon Law Book Co. 1918. pp. 378–380.
- "El Paso County Court at Law". Supplement to Vernon's Texas Civil and Criminal Statutes: Embracing All Laws of General Application Passed at the Fourth Called Sessions of the 35th and the Regular and Called Sessions of the 36th and 37th Legislatures. Vol. 1. Kansas City, Missouri: Vernon Law Book Co. 1922. pp. 432–434.
- Lustig, David (July 1998). "Pecos Valley Southern: The loneliest short line in Texas". Trains. 58 (7): 42–47.
- Maxwell, W. J., ed. (1917). General Register of the Students and Former Students of the University of Texas (PDF). Austin, Texas: University of Texas.
- Villanueva, Nicholas Jr. (2017). The Lynching of Mexicans in the Texas Borderlands. Albuquerque: University of New Mexico Press. ISBN 978-0-8263-5838-7.
