= Dolores Warwick Frese =

American college professor

- Born: Dolores Mary Warwick; April 9, 1936; Baltimore, Maryland, U.S.
- Died: May 30, 2024 (age 88); South Bend, Indiana, U.S.
- Occupations: College professor, medievalist, writer, poet

Dolores Mary Warwick Frese (April 9, 1936 – May 30, 2024) was an American medievalist and writer. She was an English professor at the University of Notre Dame from 1973 to 2014. She sued the university in 1978 for sexual discriminationafter she was denied tenure.

== Early life and education ==
Warwick was raised in Baltimore, Maryland, the daughter of Charles Carroll Warwick and Mary Keeler Warwick. Her family was Catholic; two of her six siblings took religious vows. Her grandfather Floyd Keeler became a Catholic priest late in life. She graduated from the College of Notre Dame in Maryland in 1958, and attended the Writers Workshop at the University of Iowa, completed doctoral studies in English at the University of Iowa. She later earned a master's degree in theology at the University of Notre Dame.

== Career ==
Frese joined the English faculty of the University of Notre Dame in 1973; she was one of the school's first women professors. In 1978, she led a "benchmark" class action lawsuit against Notre Dame, for sexual discrimination in the employment of female faculty. The suit was settled in 1981, and she received both tenure and back pay as a result. She retired in 2014, and the Medieval Institute at Notre Dame hosted a symposium to mark the occasion. The International Congress on Medieval Studies also had sessions to mark her 2014 retirement. She also wrote novels, stories, and poetry.

== Publications ==
=== Fiction ===
Frese's first novel, Promised Spring (1960), was written for teen readers and based on her senior thesis at the College of Notre Dame; it was accepted for publication when she was 21 years old. Her doctoral thesis became another novel, Learn to Say Goodbye (1971).

- Promised Spring (1960)
- From Ireland (1962)
- Learn to Say Goodbye (1971)
- Virgins and Martyrs (1978, short stories)

=== Scholarship ===
Frese's scholarship focused on medieval English literature. appeared in literary journals including The Chaucer Review, Notre Dame English Journal, Medieval Feminist Forum, and Studies in the Age of Chaucer.

- "Chaucer's 'Clerk's Tale': The Monsters and the Critics Reconsidered" (1973)
- Anglo-Saxon Poetry: Essays in Appreciation, for John C. McGalliard (1975, co-edited with Lewis E. Nicholson)
- "The Homoerotic Underside in Chaucer's Miller's Tale and Reeve's Tale" (1977)
- "The 'Nun's Priest's Tale': Chaucer's Identified Master Piece?" (1982)
- "'Wulf and Eadwacer': The Adulterous Woman Reconsidered" (1983)
- "Poetic prowess in Brunanburh and Maldon: Winning, losing, and literary outcome" (1986)
- "The Marriage of Woman and Werewolf: Poetics of Estrangement in Marie de France's 'Bisclavret'" (1991)
- An Ars Legendi for Chaucer's Canterbury Tales: Re-Constructive Reading (1991)
- The Book and the Body (1996, co-edited with Katherine O'Brien O'Keeffe)
- "The Art of Cynewulf's Runic Signatures" (2001)
- "The 'Buried Bodies' of Dante, Boccaccio, and Petrarch: Chaucerian 'Sources' for the Critical Fiction of Obedient Wives" (2006)
- "'Individually, and On Behalf of All Others Similarly Situated'" (2009, a personal essay about her 1978 lawsuit)

== Personal life ==
Warwick married writer and judge John Jerome Frese in 1958. They had three sons. She died in 2024, at the age of 88. in South Bend, Indiana.
