= John W. Brady =

American lawyer (died 1943)

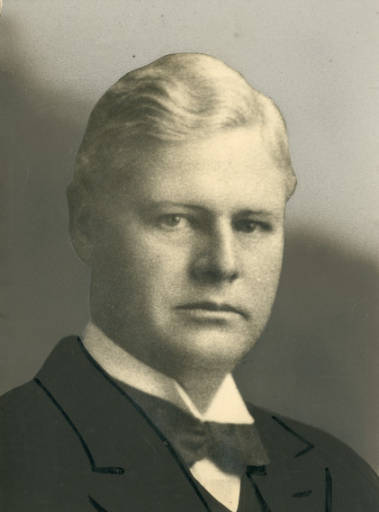

Personal details
- Born: April 6, 1869 or April 6, 1870 Brenham, Texas, U.S.
- Died: December 14, 1943 (age 73 or 74) Austin, Texas, U.S.
- Party: Democratic
- Spouse: Nellie C. Burns
- Education: University of Texas (LLB)

John W. Brady (April 6, 1869 or 1870 – December 14, 1943) was an American lawyer. He served as a county attorney from 1902 to 1910, the assistant attorney general for the state, and as a judge on the Texas Third Court of Civil Appeals. In 1929, he was convicted of murder, and sentenced to three years in prison.

== Early life and education ==
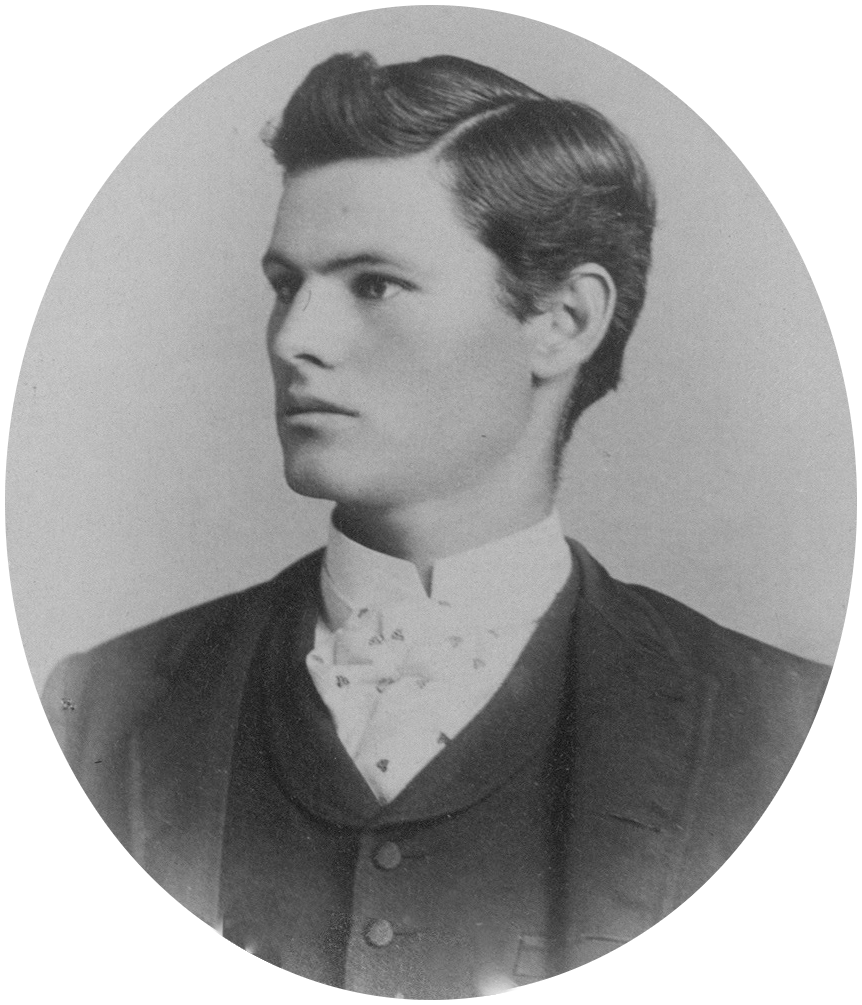
Brady in 1891, aged about 21

John W. Brady was born on April 6, either in 1869 or 1870, in Brenham, Texas. His parents were James and Agnes Brady, British emigrants who became early settlers of Austin when they moved to the city in 1871. He was the brother of Will Paul, David John, Agnes Margaret, and Helen Gertrude Brady, and the uncle of, among others, the philologist Caroline Brady.

In 1887, Brady graduated from high school, and, like each of his siblings, matriculated at the University of Texas at Austin. He enrolled in a two-year literary course there, and was a member of the athenaeum literary society. From 1890 to 1891 he studied law at the university, obtaining a Bachelor of Laws.

== Early career ==
Brady began practicing law in Austin immediately after his graduation from UT. In 1893 he was appointed a notary public, and purchased property from his parents for $1,000; (Note: In 1898 John Brady sold the property back to his parents for the same price. In early 1902 he again bought land, this time in Hyde Park, for $40.) an 1894 newspaper notice stated that he was "steadily building up a lucrative practice, making a specialty of collections and commercial law", and that his offices were located in the city's Masonic Temple. That same year he began working as an assistant to county attorney George Calhoun.

== Spanish–American War ==
During the 1898 Spanish–American War, Brady served briefly in the Texas Volunteer Guard as a corporal in Company L of the 1st Regiment, known as the Governor's Guard of Austin. Brady had been involved in the Governor's Guard as early as 1896; during the war, the regiment initially drilled at Camp Mabry in Austin, before being sent to Mobile, Alabama, in mid-May.

Brady chronicled the conditions in a series of letters to the Austin Daily Statesman. Writing on June 3 from Camp Coppinger, which he termed "Camp U.S.A.", Brady noted the heat of the Alabama summer, and "dissatisfaction" caused by a lack of supplies. "We are still without uniforms and proper equipment," he wrote, "and no one seems to know when we will get them." So too was their payday uncertain. Nonetheless, Brady suggested that "[t]he great majority of the Texas boys are made of the right stuff, and they are animated by an intense desire to see actual service in Cuba". Brady also included a series of short "Mobile Camp Notes", such as that "[t]he presence of several colored volunteer officers on the grounds a few days ago created considerable stir, and it is evident that the boys from Texas especially do not relish the idea of having the colored troops at Camp Clark moved to Camp Coppinger."

Although the 3rd and 20th infantry regiments, accompanied by the 5th Cavalry Regiment, left to fight on the night of June 3, the volunteer regiments were left behind. Believing their lack of equipment to have kept them stateside, Brady lamented "the stupidity or negligence of those who denied us this longed-for opportunity". The Governor's Guard finally received uniforms on the 5th; by the following week they also had guns, if still no pay, to go with "the big box of good things" sent by "the ladies of Austin", for which they sent the paper separate "Resolutions of thanks".

The Governor's Guard left Mobile for Jacksonville, Florida, at the end of June, but despite a belief that he might be sent to Puerto Rico, Brady, who was honorably discharged in September, made it no closer to the Caribbean. In comments to the Statesman the day after his September 12 homecoming, which he said he had also communicated to the governor, he suggested wide discontent among the Governor's Guard. "One thing that has disgusted the men," he said, "is the grand, austere air assumed by some of the officers who have straps on their shoulders", and who "treated the privates just the same as if they were hired laborers". He also noted that "at times the men would go hungry for a week or ten days", and claimed that the "great majority" of them "are dissatisfied and want to come home".

Despite never seeing combat, Brady maintained some connection with the Governor's Guard throughout his life. Shortly after his return he helped pay tribute to Private George Proctor, who died while in camp in Jacksonville, and in subsequent years occasionally visited the soldiers at Camp Mabry. In 1903 Brady was made an honorary member of the Austin Rifles, and in 1912, he joined a newly formed veteran's group, taking part in a committee to gather data and create by-laws. The headstone of his grave, paid for by the government as a benefit to a veteran, also identifies him by rank and regiment.

== Career ==
Brady resumed his law practice on September 13, 1898, the day after returning from his time with the Governor's Guard. He quickly became involved in Austin society and politics. Among other activities, he served on the invitation committee for the January 1899 inauguration of Governor Joseph D. Sayers; the board of managers for the Texas Deaf, Dumb, and Blind Institute for Colored Youth, at Sayers's behest later some ten days later; the reception committee for the University of Austin's Alumni reception and dinner in June; the committee adjudicating a contest held by the Statesman in October; the committee distributing campaign literature for County Chairman James R. Hamilton in May 1900; and as the presiding judge at a polling place for the 1900 elections that November.

Brady's first foray into elected politics came in 1901, when he unsuccessfully ran for city attorney. After stating to the Austin Daily Statesman on March 3 that he would be running for city recorder, three days later he instead announced his candidacy for city attorney in the same April 1 elections. Brady spoke at several events over the following three weeks. In the five-way race he came in second with 1,285 of the 4,214 votes cast (30%), 240 behind the winner, Victor L. Brooks.

Months after his defeat, Brady and other board members were removed by Governor Sayers from their roles at what the papers called the "colored deaf and dumb asylum", over their attempt to install a new oculist. The ex-members outlined their position in a series of letters to the Statesman in September; the previous oculist, H. L. Hilgartner, was "a gentleman and a competent specialist", they claimed, but drawing a salary from two institutes—the other being the Texas School for the Blind and Visually Impaired—as "personal favoritism", and in contravention of Texas law. They were granted a preliminary injunction, but in W. H. Taxton et al. vs. R. M. Love, comptroller, et al. a week later, according to the Statesman, "[t]he injunction was refused on defendant Hilgartner disclaiming any further claim against the state."

=== County attorney ===
Brady remained active in city affairs despite his election loss and board removal. In October 1901 he gave a presentation speech at a "competitive cake walk", and the next month showed up at a meeting of the city council to oppose its plan to purchase the plant of the old water company. By February 1902 he was again running for office, this time for county attorney of Travis County, Texas, against incumbent Henry Faulk. In three debates the next month, and a letter further explicating his position, Brady said he would seek to shut down public gambling houses if elected, terming them "a public evil and a menace to the public morals and safety" that "can not be defended by any one". Gambling remained a central theme by May, when Austin's Good Government club indicated its preference for Brady in part because of his stance, and in a debate Brady impugned Faulk for collecting fees from guilty pleas to gaming.

In June Brady won the primary for the Democratic Party: the "dominant party in this county," as he wrote, and all but assuring his victory in November. Brady made several speeches over the intervening months and won handily, 3,737 votes to 1,798, as did his brother Will, who ran uncontested for county superintendent of public instruction. Brady left the day the votes were tallied for a two-week hunting trip in Edwards County; his party arrived back home having killed a bear, and Brady was sworn into office three days later, on December 1. Within a week, Brady appointed John H. Caldwell, an old school friend, as his assistant.

Brady's first year in office continued his focus on anti-vice laws, and introduced a focus on antitrust suits. In January 1903 he had some involvement in a grand jury, convened a month before his election and discharged two after, that recommended relaxing an order restricting the circumstances in which police were allowed to enter saloons to enforce gaming and Sunday closing laws. He subsequently prosecuted violations of the Sunday closing laws, and accompanied officers going door to door to tell gambling houses to cease operation. He again spoke out against gambling as a delegate to the convention of the Austin Democratic Party the next month, where such opposition was adopted as part of the platform. Then, in October, Brady filed suit against 22 Texas railroad companies, accusing them of entering into anti-competitive contracts with the Pullman Company, and asking for damages of $10,000 against each.

Also during 1903, Brady began organizing a network of county attorneys across the state; his personal network, meanwhile, included assistant attorney general T. S. Reese, and judges T. J. Brown and F. A. Williams of the supreme court and W. M. Key and Sam Streetman of the court of civil appeals, all of whom Brady joined for a fishing trip in May. Brady also, in addition to his government work, formed a partnership with John L. Peeler, opening the law offices of Peeler & Brady in the city's masonic temple. By the end of the year Brady had collected $2,242.65 in fees for the county, of which he was entitled to pocket $256.35.

In 1904, Brady continued to prosecute gambling, and filed another spate of antitrust suits. In January, he charged the J. M. Guffey Petroleum Co. and the Beaumont Confederated Oil and Pipe Line Co. of anti-competitive behavior, the same day he filed a similar charge against the Gulf Refining Co. and the Beaumont Confederated Oil and Pipe Line Co., seeking a total of $3,163,500 in penalties. Soon after, under the director of the attorney general, Brady filed suit against the United States Fidelity and Guaranty Co., the Fidelity and Deposit Co., and the American Bond and Trust Co. Brady had a personal interest in the cases, for, at the time, 25% of penalties recovered from such actions were distributed to the prosecuting attorneys.

Brady's antitrust cases continued throughout the year without resolution. In March 1904, he tried the first of the Pullman cases filed the year before, using it as a test case to see if his legal strategy was viable; Brady's former colleague George Calhoun, now a judge, ruled that the 1899 law under which Brady had brought the suits did not apply to the allegations, but that they could instead be brought under a 1903 law. Meanwhile, the case against the Gulf and Beaumont companies was continued in June, and, with Judge Victor L. Brooks about to dismiss the case against the Guffey and Beaumont cases, Brady took a non-suit, and promptly refiled a similar case. In the second half of the year Brady dealt with other matters. In August, he visited the Chicago World's Fair with his wife, in September he filed around 1,000 suits for delinquent taxes, in November he attended a dinner honoring judge James R. Hamilton, and in December he went on a hunting trip to Yturria, warned about adulterated bran, and filed his year-end report.

Brady remained the county attorney through the end of the decade, then became an assistant attorney general of the state on January 1, 1910. On November 20, 1918, he qualified to the Third Court of Civil Appeals in Texas.

== Murder of Lehlia Highsmith ==
In November 1929, in a case that garnered front-page headlines, Brady killed his 28-year-old mistress, Lehlia Highsmith. Arriving drunk at her boarding house around midnight on the 9th, he got into an altercation with those there, and then stabbed Highsmith to death when she turned up escorted by another man. Brady was tried twice. After a first trial ended in a hung jury, Brady was convicted of murder without malice in a second trial, and sentenced to three years in prison.

=== First trial ===
Brady's first trial began at 10 am on Monday, January 20, 1930, with his not-guilty plea and the selection of the jury. The case was prosecuted by Henry Harrison Brooks, the district attorney, Roy Coleman Archer, the county attorney, and Hardy Warren Hollers, assistant county attorney. Brady was represented by a team of seven lawyers: E. A. Berry, Dayton Moses, Julius Dorenfield, Lon Curtis, Sam Dickens, John L. Peeler, and his brother Will Brady.

The appearance was Brady's first time out of jail since his arrest. He was escorted into the courthouse by the sheriff and the jailer, where he met his wife and sister Helen, and was said by The Austin Statesman to be dressed "immaculately" in a gray suit, with his left pinkie still bandaged from where it was cut two months before. Brady was read the murder indictment and pleaded not guilty.

==== Jury selection ====
Jurors
Name	# (Note: The order in which the juror was questioned. For instance, W. L. Wright, the first juror selected, was the 21st juror individually questioned)	Age	Occupation
Walter Lee Wright	21	27	furniture repairman
James Robert Keltner	31	58	merchant
A. A. Mobley	65	51	laborer
John Anton Dittmar	83	56	farmer
R. P. Burke	85	27	sign painter
Fred Erzkus		31	mill worker (Note: Listed as a 31-year-old mill worker at Woodward Manufacturing Company in news coverage and the 1930 United States census, but as a 58 year old at his death 24 years later, in 1954.)
William Claud Fruth		52	painter
William Chester Turner		37	farmer
William M. Armstrong		53	teamster
Tom Henry White		32	butcher
Cloister Collis Miles		22	hardware clerk
Paul Ludvick Hoglund	176	24	filling station attendant

The majority of the first week was taken up by jury selection. On Monday, 147 of the 250 members of the prospective panel showed up to the court; per the Statesman, "ten were excused by noon and over half the remaining number were bombarding Judge J. D. Moore with varied excuses of why they should not help determine the guilt or innocence of the former civil appeals judge". Only 85 survived this process, and all 13 who were individually questioned on the first day were excused. The first three jurors were not selected until Tuesday. The selection of the first was so unexpected, coming as it did after so many disqualifications, that it sent three journalists scrambling to report the news to their papers. With the pool dwindling, the court summoned an additional 200 veniremen to appear on Wednesday; on this day none were selected, however, with The Austin American calling a matching Nile green shirt and tie worn by Moses "[t]he high spot" of the proceedings. With only three jurors yet selected, the witnesses, already assembled, were excused until Monday morning.

Jury selection sped up on Thursday, with five new jurors chosen. Moses, who selected the first three of these and had conducted the previous three days of voir dire, left at the noon recess for his bed at the Driskill Hotel with the flu. With Moses still in bed, the final four jurors were selected on Friday; the last, the 176th individually questioned that week, was picked near the end of the day. As the witnesses had been told not to show up until Monday, proceedings were set to restart then at 10 am; the jury remained sequestered over the weekend.

==== Testimony ====
Proceedings began on Monday, shortly before the 10 am start, with a courtroom fistfight between Moses and Archer. Moses, who had been expected to remain bedridden, was floored twice by blows to the jaw. "He struck at me first," Archer claimed, and said Moses had called him names; later, The Austin American reported the cause of the fight to be a witness's testimony that Archer had suggested the witness had been offered a bribe to change his testimony, which he denied.

==== Verdict ====
The first trial ended after four days of deliberation in a hung jury, with nine jurors reportedly favoring the death penalty, two life imprisonment, and one acquittal.

=== Second trial ===
In the second trial, tried in Dallas this time, Brady was found guilty of murder without malice on the jury's fifth ballot and sentenced to three years in prison, at which point he cried out "I didn’t do it; I didn’t do it. I do not deserve that sentence." Brady was confined in the Huntsville Unit until March 1931, when he was put in charge of the prison school at Harlem Farm. With credits for work performed while incarcerated Brady eventually served less than two years, and was released on July 1, 1932. He returned to his home in Austin and engaged in legal research.

== Later years ==
Brady returned to his house in Austin after his release from prison, where he continued to live with his wife, and engaged in legal research. In February 1933 he was granted a full pardon by Governor Miriam A. Ferguson. Brady's leg was amputated around 1942, and he died on December 17, 1943, at 7:45 am at Austin's Seton Hospital, following a long illness. He was a Catholic, and was buried in Austin's Mt. Calvary Cemetery.

== Personal life ==
Brady married Nellie C. Burns, an Austin resident but originally from Alton, Illinois, on June 18, 1901. She was also active in society. The couple had an adopted daughter, Margaret Butler, who was born in Austin on July 4, 1901; she married Sam E. Pondrom of Houston on January 18, 1923, in what newspapers described as "one of the most prominent society events of the season". Brady had a dog, a young pug named Teddy, for whom he placed a lost notice in the Statesman in 1901. Brady's wife died almost two years after him, on August 30, 1945, and was buried in the same cemetery; Sam Pondrom was one of the pallbearers.

== Bibliography ==
- Maxwell, W. J., ed. (1917). General Register of the Students and Former Students of the University of Texas (PDF). Austin, Texas: University of Texas.
