= Cristina Fraire =

Argentine photographer

Cristina Fraire (born 1949 Buenos Aires) is an Argentine photographer. She studied at the Universidad de Buenos Aires and ]the Sociedad Argentina de Artistas Plásticos (Argentine Association of Plastic Artists, SAAP). In 1997 she was a recipient of a Guggenheim Fellowship for photography.

Her work is held in the collections of the Museo Nacional de Bellas Artes, Buenos Aires, Light Work, Syracuse, New York, and the Museum of Fine Arts Houston. She won the Konex Award from Argentina in 2022.
