= Peter J. Rossky =

American chemist

Peter Rossky
- Occupation: American Chemist

Academic background
- Education: Cornell University (BS); Harvard University (PhD)
- Doctoral advisor: Martin Karplus

Academic work
- Institutions: Rice University

Peter J. Rossky is an American theoretical chemist who has worked on understanding molecular processes in condensed phases. He serves as the Harry C. & Olga K. Wiess Chair in Natural Sciences and Professor of Chemistry at Rice University.

Rossky is a member of the National Academy of Sciences and the American Academy of Arts and Sciences.

== Education and career ==
Rossky earned his undergraduate degree in Chemistry summa cum laude from Cornell University. He completed his Ph.D. in Chemical Physics at Harvard University in 1978 under the mentorship of Martin Karplus. Following a postdoctoral fellowship at SUNY Stony Brook with Harold Friedman, he joined the faculty at the University of Texas at Austin in 1979. There, he held the Marvin K. Collie-Welch Regents Chair in Chemistry and served as Director of the Center for Computational Molecular Sciences. In 2014, Rossky joined Rice University as the Dean of the Wiess School of Natural Sciences, a position he held until 2021, after which he continued as a professor and researcher.

== Research ==
Rossky contributed to understanding molecular processes in condensed phase systems. He worked on theoretical and computational studies of chemical and biomolecular structures, reaction dynamics, and electronic processes within liquid environments.

A central theme in Rossky's work is elucidating the role of liquids, particularly water, as active participants in chemical reactions. Utilizing molecular dynamics simulations, he has explored the structure and behavior of liquid water at various interfaces, including hydrophobic interactions. Rossky has also investigated the influence of water on electron-initiated processes and radical chemistry, addressing complex issues in this domain.

An additional area of his research focuses on the quantum mechanical behavior of molecular systems in condensed phases. He has developed methods to evaluate spectroscopic signatures of molecular species and track the evolution of energy in electronically excited states. His has worked on the hydrated electron, through quantum simulations of its structure, spectroscopy, and dynamics.

== Awards ==
- 2011: National Academy of Sciences
- 2018: Hirschfelder Prize in Theoretical Chemistry
- 2009: ACS Physical Chemistry Division Award in Theoretical Chemistry
- 2004: American Academy of Arts and Sciences
- 1997: Guggenheim Fellowship
