= Katherine O'Brien O'Keeffe =

American medievalist (born 1948)

- Born: July 30, 1948 (age 77)
- Education: Fordham University; University of Pennsylvania (PhD)
- Occupation: Professor
- Employer: University of California, Berkeley

Katherine O'Brien O'Keeffe (born July 30, 1948) is an American medievalist specializing in Old English. Her work focuses on orality and literacy, manuscript cultures, and questions of embodiment and agency in Old English and Anglo-Latin literature. She is Professor Emerita of English at UC Berkeley.

== Career ==
O'Brien O'Keeffe received her PhD from the University of Pennsylvania in 1975. In that year, she joined the Department of English at Texas A&M University.

In 1990, O'Brien O'Keeffe's book Visible Song: Transitional Literacy in Old English Verse appeared from Cambridge University Press, introducing the idea of "transitional literacy" to debates about the orality of Old English poetry. In 1992, she joined the faculty at the University of Notre Dame. She edited and co-edited numerous volumes on the editing of Old English, early English culture, Anglo-Latin learning, and related subjects. In 2008, she became the Clyde and Evelyn Slusser Professor of English at UC Berkeley. Her book Stealing Obedience: Narratives of Agency and Identity in Later Anglo-Saxon England appeared from University of Toronto Press in 2012.

O'Brien O'Keeffe became a Guggenheim Fellow in 1997, became a fellow of the Medieval Academy of America in 2015, and held the Eastman Professorship at Oxford University from 2017-2018.

== Selected publications ==
=== Books ===
- Stealing Obedience: Narratives of Agency and Identity in Later Anglo-Saxon England (2012)
- (with Lou Burnard and John Unsworth) Electronic Textual Editing (2006)
- (ed. with Andy Orchard) Latin Learning and English Lore (2005)
- (ed. with Mark C. Amodio) Unlocking the Wordhord: Anglo-Saxon Studies in Memory of Edward B. Irving, Jr. (2003)
- (ed. with Sarah Larratt Keefer) New Approaches to Editing Old English Verse (1998)
- (ed. with Dolores Warwick Frese) The Book and the Body (1997)
- (ed.) Reading Old English Texts (1997)
- (ed.) Old English Shorter Poems (1994)
- (ed. with Margaret J.M. Ezell) Cultural Artifacts and the Production of Meaning: The Page, the Image, and the Body (1994)
- Visible Song: Transitional Literacy in Old English Verse (1990)

=== Chapters ===
- O'Keeffe, Katherine O'Brien (November 1997). "Diction, Variation, the Formula". In Bjork, Robert E. & Niles, John D. (eds.). A Beowulf Handbook. Lincoln: University of Nebraska Press. pp. 85–104. ISBN 0-8032-1237-2.
