= Ricardo Bressani =

Guatemalan food scientist

- César Ricardo Bressani Castignoli
- Born: 28 September 1926; Guatemala City, Guatemala
- Died: 30 January 2015 (aged 88)
- Education: University of Dayton
- Spouse: Alicia Herman
- Awards: Babcock-Hart Award (1970); McCollum Award (1976); Albert Einstein World Award of Science (1984); Abraham Horwitz Award (1990); Order of the Quetzal, Grand Cross (1999); Premio México de Ciencia y Tecnología (2001); Danone International Prize for Nutrition (2003); Distinguished Alumnus Award (2012); Dr. Ricardo Bressani Medal (2013)
- Scientific career
- Fields: Biochemistry, Nutrition
- Workplaces: Institute of Nutrition of Central America and Panama; Universidad del Valle de Guatemala

Cesar Ricardo Bressani Castignoli (28 September 1926 – 30 January 2015) was a Guatemalan food scientist. Born in Guatemala City, he received a bachelor of science in chemical engineering degree from the University of Dayton in 1948. In 1951, he received a master's degree from Iowa State University. In the same year, Bressani returned to Guatemala where he worked at the Institute of Nutrition of Central America and Panama, INCAP. In 1952, he received a scholarship from the Rockefeller Foundation to study biochemistry at Purdue University, where Bressani obtained his Ph.D. in 1956. Afterwards, he reincorporated to the INCAP, this time as the head of the Division of Agricultural Sciences and Food until 1993.

In 1983, Bressani became one of the 42 founding members of the Third World Academy of Sciences, known today as The World Academy of Sciences. In the 1990s, Bressani was the editor-in-chief of the journal Archivos Latinoamericanos de Nutrición. He was also an associate editor of the Food and Nutrition Bulletin. In 1992, he arrived to the Universidad del Valle de Guatemala, and in 1998, he founded the Center for the Studies of Food Science and Technology. Bressani wrote more than 300 publications in many scholarly international journals.

Bressani performed an investigation on practical solutions to nutritional problems within the population of Guatemala and the rest of Central America. His experiments led to the creation and production of Incaparina, a nutritional supplement based on a mixture of corn flour, soy flour, cottonseed meal, and Torula yeast. This supplement was intended to be primarily served in the form of gruel.
