= Premio México de Ciencia y Tecnología =

Mexican science and technology award

- Description: Award recognizing outstanding scientific and technological achievements by Ibero-American scholars
- Country: Mexico
- Presented by: CONACYT
- Website: http://www.premiomx.ccciencias.mx/

Premio México de Ciencia y Tecnología is an award bestowed in by the CONACYT to Ibero-American (Latin America plus the Iberian Peninsula) scholars in recognition of advances in science and/or technology. In the selection of the recipients the work done on institutions located in Ibero-America is deemed particularly meriting.

== Award winners ==
- Jacinto Convit, 1990
- Juan José Giambiagi, 1991
- Johanna Döbereiner, 1992
- José Leite Lopes, 1993
- Ignacio Rodriguez-Iturbe, 1994
- José Luis Massera, 1997
- Margarita Salas Falgueras, 1998
- Sergio Enrique Ferreira, 1999
- Jacob Palis, Jr., 2000
- Ricardo Bressani Castignoli, 2001
- Martín Schmal, 2002
- Constantino Tsallis, 2003
- Ginés Morata Pérez, 2004
- Avelino Corma Canós, 2005
- Antonio García-Bellido y García de Diego, 2006
- Ramón Latorre de la Cruz, 2007
- Mayana Zatz, 2008
- Miguel Ángel Alario y Franco, 2009
- Boaventura de Sousa Santos, 2010
- Carlos López Otín, 2011
- Juan Carlos Castilla Zenobi, 2012
- Víctor Alberto Ramos, 2013
- Carlos Martínez Alonso, 2014
- Andrés Moya, 2015
- Rafael Radi Isola, 2016
- María Ángela Nieto, 2017
- José W. F. Valle, 2018

== See also ==
- CONACYT
- History of science and technology in Mexico
- National Prize for Arts and Sciences
