= Baby food =

Food made especially for infants

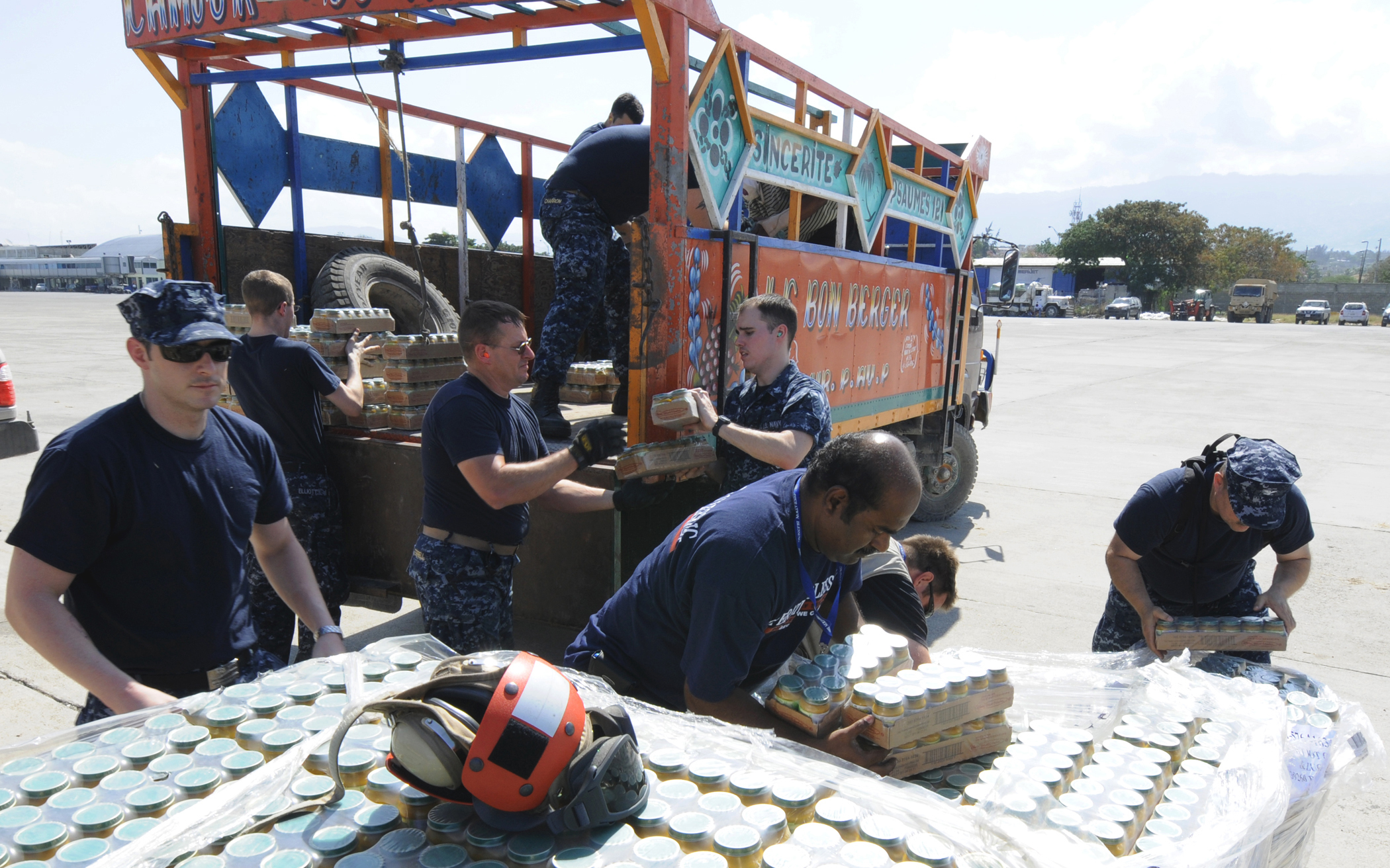
- Commercial baby food is often a humanitarian relief item. Delivery of infant formula may be criticized because it can discourage breastfeeding and the local water supply may be contaminated after a disaster, making powdered formula unsafe.

Baby food is any soft, easily consumed food other than breastmilk or infant formula that is made specifically for human babies between six months and two years old. The food comes in many varieties and flavors that are purchased ready-made from producers, or it may be table food eaten by the family that has been mashed or otherwise broken down.

== Readiness and health ==
=== Readiness ===
As of 2023, the World Health Organization, UNICEF and many national health agencies recommended waiting until six months of age before starting a child on food.

In Italy in 2020, a survey of parents found that more than two-thirds of babies were first fed baby food when they were five or six months old. A survey in Scotland in 2017 indicated that almost no babies were fed baby food before the age of four months, and that about half of them were not given baby food until they were at least six months old.

Inappropriately early introduction of baby food (i.e., before the baby is at least four months old) was associated with the family being concerned that the baby's hunger was not satisfied by breastmilk alone. Feeding a baby baby food, or any food except breastmilk or infant formula, before the age of four months is also associated with the development of food allergies; delaying the introduction of potentially allergenic foods, such as peanuts, beyond six months provides no health benefit. It also increases the risk of choking (inability to breathe due to food stuck in the airway), strain on the kidneys, and gastroenteritis (a painful inflammation of the gut that can cause vomiting and diarrhea).

=== Health ===
As a global public health recommendation, the World Health Organization recommends that infants should be exclusively breastfed for the first six months of life to achieve optimal growth, development and health. Most six-month-old infants are physiologically and developmentally ready for new foods, textures and modes of feeding. Experts advising the World Health Assembly have provided evidence that introducing solids earlier than six months increases babies' chances of illness, without improving growth.

One of the health concerns associated with the introduction of solid foods before six months is iron deficiency. The early introduction of complementary foods may satisfy the hunger of the infant, resulting in less frequent breastfeeding and ultimately less milk production in the mother. Because iron absorption from human milk is depressed when the milk is in contact with other foods in the proximal small bowel, early use of complementary foods may increase the risk of iron depletion and anemia.

In Canada sodium content in infant food is regulated; strained fruit, fruit juice, fruit drink, and cereal cannot be sold if sodium has been added (excluding strained desserts). Foods naturally containing sodium are limited to 0.05 - 0.25 grams per 100 grams of food, depending on the type of infant food.

If there is a family history of allergies, one may wish to introduce only one new food at a time, leaving a few days in between to notice any reactions that would indicate a food allergy or sensitivity. This way, if the child is unable to tolerate a certain food, it can be determined which food is causing the reaction.

Meeting the nutritional needs of infants as they grow is essential for their healthy development. Feeding infants inappropriately or insufficiently can cause major illnesses and affect their physical and mental development. Educational campaigns that share information on when to introduce solid foods, appropriate types of foods to feed an infant, and hygiene practices are effective at improving these feeding practices.

== Nutritional needs and the amount of food ==
The World Health Organization recommends starting in small amounts that gradually increase as the child gets older: 2 to 3 meals per day for infants 6 to 8 months of age and 3 to 4 meals per day for infants 9 to 23 months of age, with 1 or 2 additional snacks as required.

Newborns need a diet of breastmilk or infant formula. In infants, minimum carbohydrate (mainly lactose) intake should be 40% of total energy, gradually increasing to 55% energy by the age of 2 years.

As shown in the 2008 Feeding Infants and Toddlers study, the overall diet of babies and toddlers, the primary consumers of baby food, generally meets or significantly exceeds the recommended amount of macronutrients. Toddlers and preschoolers generally ate too little dietary fiber, and preschoolers generally ate too much saturated fat, although the overall fat intake was lower than recommended. Micronutrient levels were typically within the recommended levels. A small group of older infants in the American study needed more iron and zinc, such as from iron-fortified baby foods. A substantial proportion of toddlers and preschoolers exceeded the upper recommended level of synthetic folate, preformed vitamin A, zinc, and sodium (salt).

== Preparation and feeding ==
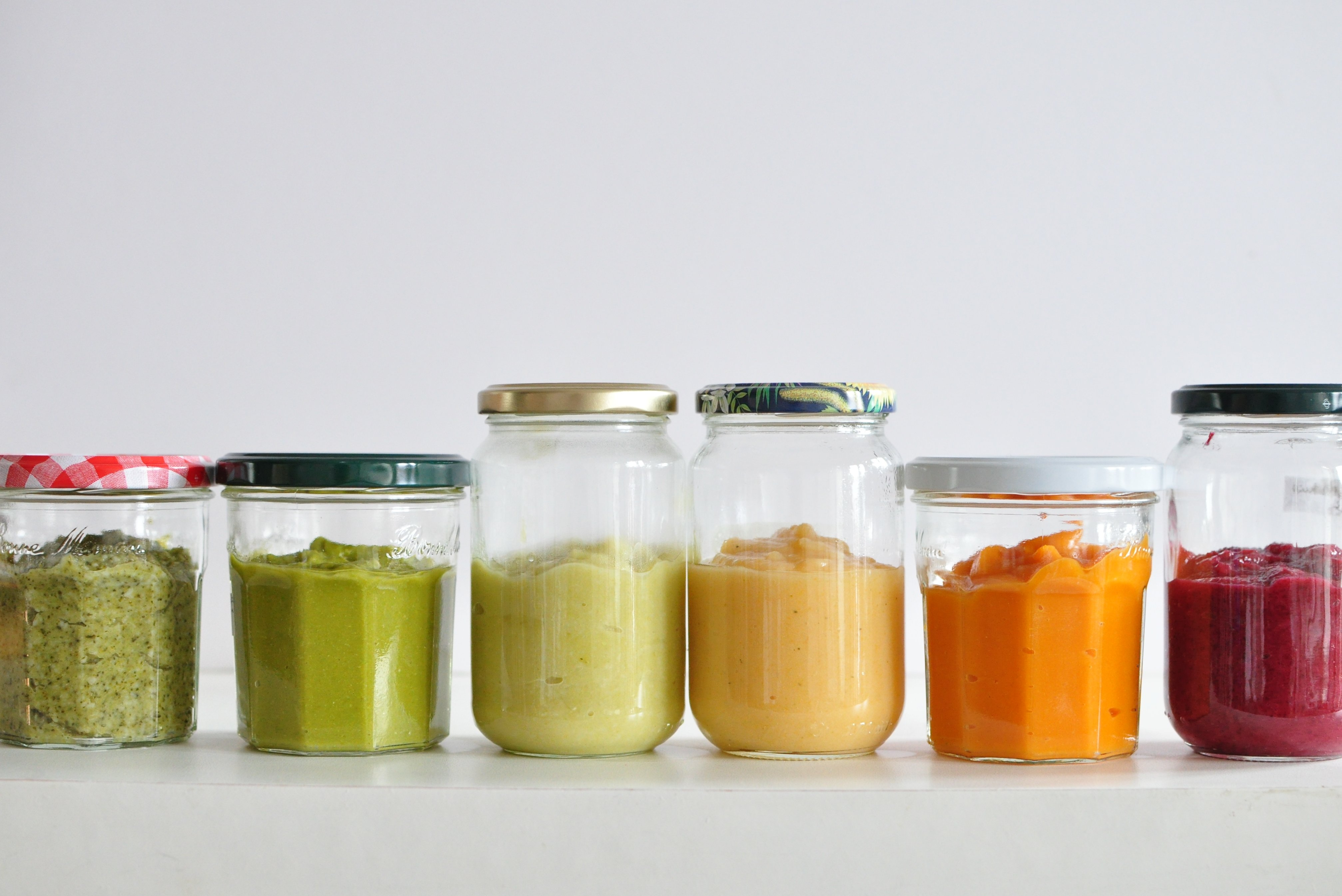
This pureed baby food was made at home and frozen in glass jars.

Baby foods are either a soft, liquid paste or an easily chewed food since babies lack developed muscles and teeth to effectively chew. Babies typically move to consuming baby food once nursing or formula is not sufficient for the child's appetite. Babies do not need to have teeth to transition to eating solid foods. Teeth, however, normally do begin to show up at this age. Care should be taken with certain foods that pose a choking hazard, such as undercooked vegetables, grapes, or food that may contain bones.

Babies begin eating liquid style baby food consisting of pureed vegetables and fruits, sometimes mixed with rice cereal and formula, or breastmilk. Then, as the baby is better able to chew, small, soft pieces or lumps may be included. Care should be taken, as babies with teeth have the ability to break off pieces of food but they do not possess the back molars to grind, so food can be carefully mashed or pre-chewed, or broken into manageable pieces for their baby.

Around 6 months of age, babies may begin to feed themselves (picking up food pieces with hands, using the whole fist, or later the pincer grasp (the thumb and forefinger)) with help from older family members or caregivers.

=== Homemade or commercial ===
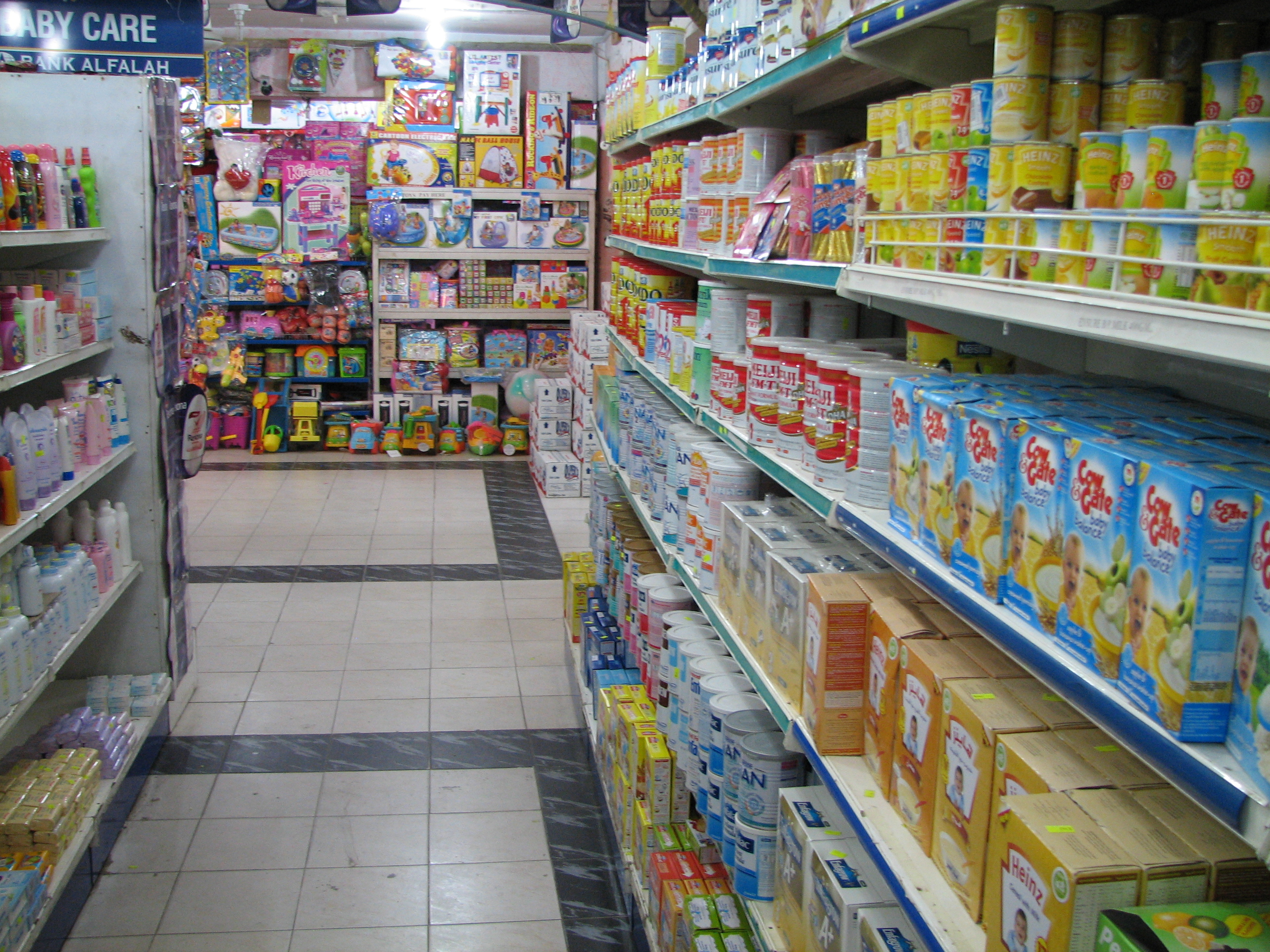
Market aisle stocked with commercial baby food

Video of making homemade puree apple

Homemade baby food is less expensive than commercial baby foods. Homemade food is appropriate only when the family has a sufficient and varied diet, as well as access to refrigeration and basic sanitation. It is important to follow proper sanitation methods when preparing homemade baby food such as washing and rinsing vegetables or fruit, as well as the cooking and packaging materials that will be used.

Homemade food requires more preparation time than simply opening a jar or box of ready-to-eat commercial baby food. Food may need to be minced or pureed for young babies, or cooked separately without the salt, intense spices, or sugar that the family chooses to eat.

=== Picky eating ===
Parents and/or caregivers may perceive up to half of toddlers as being "picky" or "faddy", with the peak around 24 months. Adults who hold this opinion often stop offering new foods to the child after only three to five attempts, rather than continuing to offer the food until the child has tasted it eight to fifteen times. They may also engage in counterproductive behaviors, such as offering appetite-suppressing milk or other favorite foods as an alternative, or trying to force or bribe the child into eating.

== Types ==
Through the first year, breastmilk or infant formula is the main source of calories and nutrients. By six months old, infants are ready to be introduced to table food.

Babies may be started directly on normal family food if attention is given to choking hazards; this is called baby-led weaning. Because breastmilk takes on the flavor of foods eaten by the mother, these foods are especially good choices.

=== Food type ===
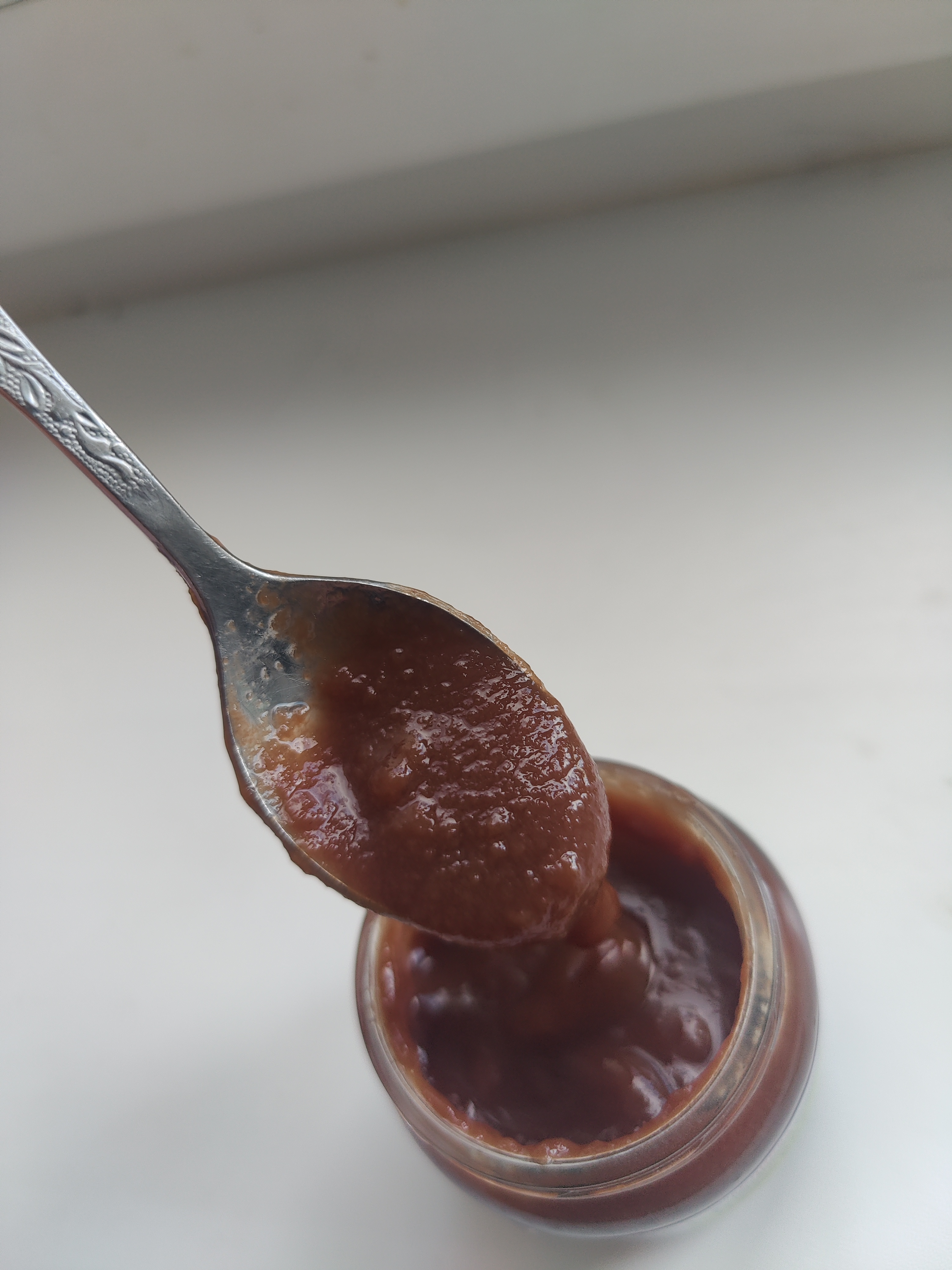
A small jar of pureed plums. A baby who is just beginning to eat baby food might not swallow even one small spoonful.

Cereals
On a typical day about half of American babies aged four and five months old are fed infant cereal. The baby may have eaten as little as one small bite of infant cereal, or even as little as one small bite of a food that contains infant cereal mixed with other foods. Other types of grain-based foods are rare at that age. About 90% of babies aged six to twelve months eat some type of grain, although only half eat infant cereal. The others eat rice, bread, crackers, pasta, or cereal designed for older children.
Fruits
On any given day, about 20% of babies aged four and five months eat some type of fruit, usually a prepared baby food. As with all of these, this may represent as little as one small bite of fruit or a food partly composed of fruit. Two-thirds of babies aged six to nine months, and between 75% and 85% of babies and toddlers older than nine months, eat some type of fruit. At age six to nine months, half of the babies are eating prepared baby food fruits, but toddlers aged 12 months and older primarily eat non-baby food fruits, such as fresh bananas or canned fruits. Apple and bananas are common fruits for babies of all ages. Fruit juice, primarily apple and grape juice, is usually introduced later than fruit, and about half of older babies and toddlers drink some type of 100% fruit juice.
Vegetables
On a typical day, about a quarter of babies aged four and five months eat some type of vegetable at least once, almost always prepared baby food, and usually a yellow or orange vegetable like carrots, pumpkin, sweet potatoes, and winter squash. At age six to nine months, about 60% of babies and about 70% of older babies and toddlers eat vegetables, with baby food vegetables rapidly being replaced by cooked vegetables after about nine months. Raw vegetables are uncommon for all babies and toddlers. By the first birthday, almost a third of babies eat potatoes on a given day.
Meat
Very few four- and five-month-old American babies eat meat or other protein sources (excluding milk). Six- to nine-month-old babies mostly eat meat as part of baby food that contains a small amount of meat along with vegetables or grains. About three-quarters of nine- to twelve-month-old babies are given either meat or another protein source, such as eggs, cheese, yogurt, beans, or nuts. More than 90% of babies aged 12 to 18 months old, and nearly all toddlers older than that, are given a protein source at least once a day. Almost three-quarters of these toddlers are given non-baby food meat; prepared baby food meat (by itself) is uncommon at any age.
Sweet and salty foods
Sweet and salty foods are uncommon for babies. Compared to a prior study in 2002, the number of babies under the age of nine months that received any sort of sweetened food, snack, or beverage, had dropped by nearly half. At age nine to twelve months, fewer than half of babies are given sweetened foods like cookies, ice cream, or fruit-flavored drinks. Prepared baby food desserts are uncommon at any age, but are given to almost 12% of babies aged nine to twelve months. It is recommended to consume natural sugars from fruits and vegetables to satisfy children's cravings while providing essential nutrients, to prevent future health issues caused by added sugars and saturated fats.

Baby's first foods in different countries
Region	Country	First food	Age at first food (months)	Feeding methods
Africa	Nigeria (Yoruba people)	eko, a liquid pap from sorghum or maize (corn)	6	The pap is held in the mother's cupped hand and poured into the baby's mouth. The mother may force-feed the baby if the baby resists swallowing it.
Africa	Tanzania (Wagogo people)	uji, a thin millet gruel	3 to 4	Uji is drunk from a cup or gourd.
Africa	Mali	porridge or gruel made of millet or rice, perhaps with fish or potatoes	7 for girls and 10 for boys	Children feed themselves, with their right hands, from a bowl.
Africa	Zimbabwe	bota, a pap made from ground corn meal	3 or earlier	The mother or caregiver feeds the baby with a cup or spoon.
South America	Brazil	cornstarch and other grains	4	Powdered milk was often given to newborns before 3 months of age. After 6 months, most babies ate beans and rice or whatever the family ate. Adult foods were broken into small bits and fed from the mother's hand.
South America	Guatemala	Incaparina or cornmeal gruel, eggs, and fruit juice	4 to 6	Mothers normally chose suitable food from among what the family was eating. Cornmeal gruel was often given in a bottle.
South America	Peru	Wheat and potato soup	6 to 8	Children were normally allowed to feed themselves, unless they were ill. Urban children were given solid foods sooner than rural children.
South America	Dominican Republic	Orange juice, lime juice, beans	3	Powdered milk was often given to newborns before 1 month of age. Milk and juice were usually given in a bottle. Fruits and vegetables were usually introduced before meat and beans, and grains were usually last.
Asia	Bhutan	porridge of rice flour or maize, cooked with butter	2	Babies are fed from their mother's hands.
Asia	Bangladesh	finger foods, rice, or rice-like foods		The amount of solid food given to the babies is usually very small, but happened several times each day. The food is usually held in the caregiver's hands, but a bottle, cup, or spoon may be used.
Asia	Nepal	grains	6	Mothers pre-chewed grains that they were cooking for the rest of the family, mixed them with water or butter, and used their fingers to put the food in their baby's' mouth. Babies in Hindu families were fed rice at the age of 3 weeks in the celebration of Annaprashana, but did not regularly eat food until later. Many mothers work on farms, and the introduction of solid foods often happened at the start of busy agricultural times.
Asia	Philippines	lugao (a rice porridge), mashed fruits or vegetables, or soft bread	3 to 6	Bottle-feeding was perceived as having a higher social status. Mothers rejected fibrous foods such as pineapple and maize because of a belief that babies could not digest these foods easily.
Oceania	Papua New Guinea	mashed papaya, sweet potato, pumpkin, and banana	6 to 12	Water, vegetable broth and peeled sugar cane were given to young infants as an extra source of fluids. Liquids were given in a bowl, cup, or bamboo straw. Taro and meat were withheld until the baby was about a year old. Traditionally, babies were not given solid foods until they could walk.
Oceania	Solomon Islands (Kwaio people)	Pre-chewed taro with water or sweet potato cooked in coconut milk	0 to 9	Practices among the Kwaio people were divided by religious tradition. Many pagan mothers, who adhere to traditional food taboos, began feeding their babies solid foods within 1 to 2 months after birth; they thoroughly chew the food and feed it mouth-to-mouth for the first few months. This was also a common practice for feeding a hungry baby if the mother was temporarily unavailable. Sukuru (a tradition related to Christian colonizers) mothers usually began feeding solid foods between 6 and 9 months. Some fed babies mouth-to-mouth; others pre-chewed, boiled, or mashed the food and gave it to the baby in a spoon or the baby's hand.
Oceania	Trobriand Islands	soup, then mashed or pre-chewed yams or taro	1	In the 1970s and 1980s, some women followed traditional post-partum practices that placed the mother and baby in seclusion, in a dark building with a fire. Foods were considered kanua (e.g., taro or breastmilk) and kawenu (e.g., wild vegetables or commercial infant formula). Foods that were considered kanua were preferred for babies.
North America	United States	Infant cereal, then pureed fruits or vegetables	2 to 6	Cereal was mixed with infant formula and given in a bottle, or fed to the baby with a spoon. Poor women began feeding solid foods much earlier than wealthier women.

=== Toddler foods ===
Some commercial baby food companies have expanded their lines to produce specialty foods for toddlers from the age of about 12 months to two and a half years old. These include juice, cereal, small microwaveable meals, baked goods, and other foods that have been formulated and marketed for toddlers.

=== Geriatric use ===
In the late 1940s, Gerber Products Company and Beech-Nut produced special cookbooks to promote the sale of commercial baby foods for use by elderly, sick, or disabled people.

== Historical and cultural ==
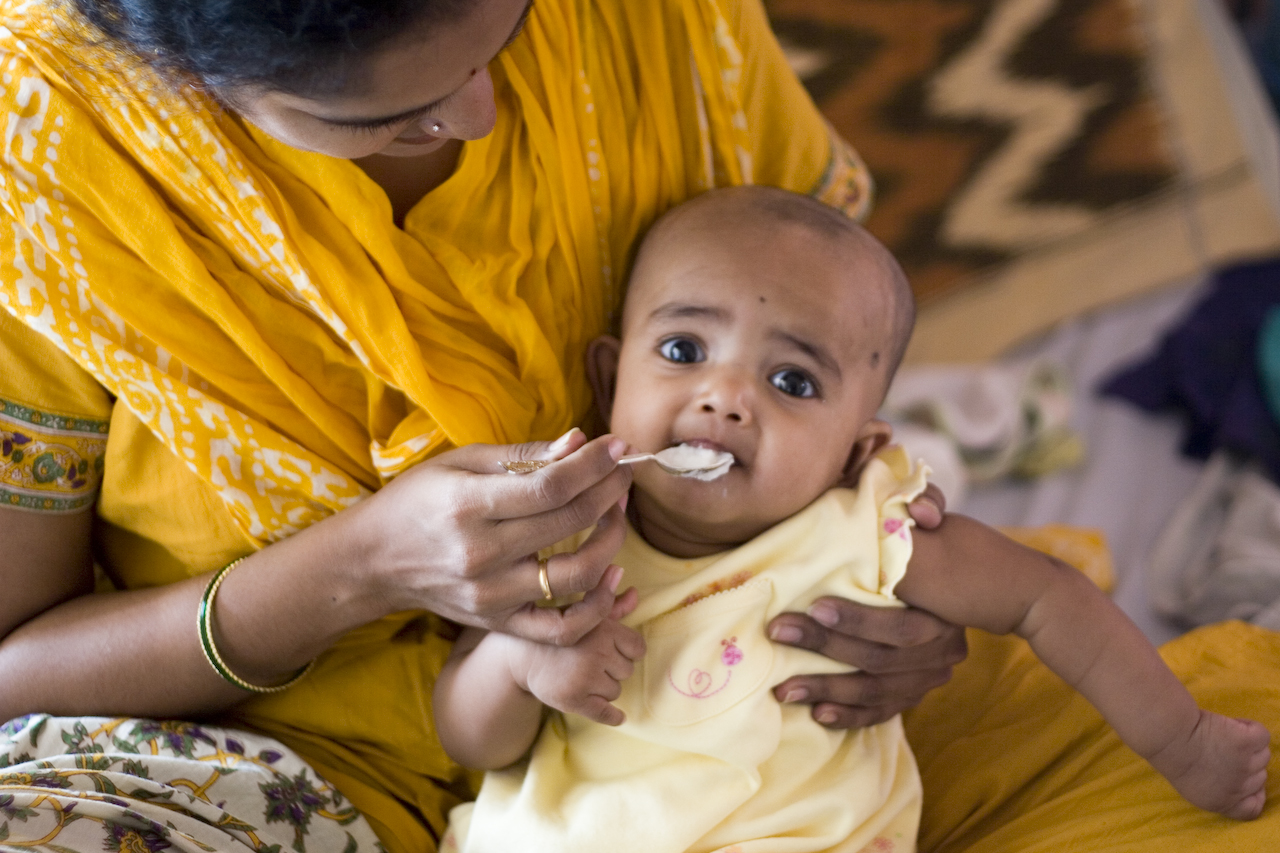
A Hindu child receives their first solid food in a religious ceremony called Annaprashana

Baby food varies from culture to culture. In many cultures, pastes of a grain and liquids are the first baby food. In human history and presently with many cultures around the world, babies are fed food premasticated by the caretaker of the baby in order to pulverise the food and start the digestion process.

In the Western world until the mid-1900s, baby food was generally made at home. The industrial revolution saw the beginning of the baby food market which promoted commercial baby foods as convenience items. In developed countries, babies are now often started with commercially produced iron-fortified infant cereals, and then move on to mashed fruits and vegetables. Commercial baby foods are widely available in dry, ready-to-feed and frozen forms, often in small batches (e.g. small jars) for convenience of preparation. On the contrary, in developing countries, breastfeeding is more widely accepted and socially tolerated in public, thus creating a societal contrast. Amy Bentley, author of Inventing Baby Food, talks about how infant feeding reflects one's "position in the postwar era of the American Century" because in developed countries, families are able to purchase processed baby foods to feed their children, whereas in developing country, natural breastfeeding is more popular.

Commercially prepared baby foods in the Netherlands were first prepared by Martinus van der Hagen through his NV Nutricia company in 1901. In United States they were first prepared by Harold Clapp who sold Clapp's Baby Food in the 1920s. The Fremont Canning Company, now called the Gerber Products Company, started in 1927. The Beech-Nut company entered the U.S. baby food market in 1931. The first precooked dried baby food was Pablum which was originally made for sick children in the 1930s. Other commercial baby food manufacturers include H. J. Heinz Company, Nestlé, Nutricia, Organix and Unilever. Heinz produced dehydrated baby food in the 1980s. The demand from parents for organic food began to grow in the 1960s; since then, many larger commercial manufacturers have introduced organic lines of infant food.

At the beginning of the 20th century in America, most babies began eating baby food around the age of seven months. During and shortly after World War II, the age at which solid food was first introduced dropped to just six weeks. This age has since increased to four to six months. By the mid-20th century, manufactured baby food was readily used and supplemented previous infant feeding practices. Author of Inventing Baby Food, Amy Bentley argues that the excessive additives of sugar, salt, and MSG in overused manufactured baby food conditioned infants to prefer processed foods later in life. Also, it is believed that exposing infants to solid foods at an earlier age well help them get used to foods later on in life. This subsequent misuse of salt and sugar was also feared to effect issues of weight and nutrition based diseases.

In China and other east Asian countries, homemade baby food remains common, and babies are started on rice porridge called congee, then move on to mashed fruits, soft vegetables, tofu and fish.

In Sweden, it is common to start with mashed fruit, such as bananas, as well as oatmeal and mashed vegetables.

In western Africa, maize porridge is often the first solid food given to young children.

An infant's first bite of solid food is ceremonial and holds religious importance in many cultures. An example of this is annaprashan, a Hindu ritual where the infant is fed a sweetened rice porridge, usually blessed, by an elder family member. Similar rites of passage are practiced in other Hindu areas, including the Bengal region, Vietnam, and Thailand.

First foods in different cultures
Region	Country	First food	Age at first food (months)	Feeding methods
Africa	Nigeria (Yoruba people)	eko, a liquid pap from sorghum or maize	6	The pap is held in the mother's cupped hand and poured into the baby's mouth. The mother may force-feed the baby if the baby resists swallowing it.
Africa	Tanzania (Wagogo people)	uji, a thin millet gruel	3 to 4	Uji is drunk from a cup or gourd.
Africa	Mali	porridge or gruel made of millet or rice, perhaps with fish or potatoes	7 for girls and 10 for boys	Children feed themselves, with their right hands, from a bowl.
Africa	Zimbabwe	bota, a pap made from ground corn meal	3 or earlier	The mother or caregiver feeds the baby with a cup or spoon.
South America	Brazil	cornstarch and other grains	4	Powdered milk was often given to newborns before 3 months of age. After 6 months, most babies ate beans and rice or whatever the family ate. Adult foods were broken into small bits and fed from the mother's hand.
South America	Guatemala	cornmeal or Incaparina gruel, eggs, and fruit juice	4 to 6	Mothers normally chose suitable food from among what the family was eating. Cornmeal gruel was often given in a bottle.
South America	Peru	wheat and potato soup	6 to 8	Children were normally allowed to feed themselves, unless they were ill. Urban children were given solid foods sooner than rural children.
South America	Dominican Republic	orange juice, lime juice, beans	3	Powdered milk was often given to newborns before 1 month of age. Milk and juice were usually given in a bottle. Fruits and vegetables were usually introduced before meat and beans, and grains were usually last.
Asia	Bhutan	porridge of rice flour or maize, cooked with butter	2	Babies are fed from their mother's hands.
Asia	Bangladesh	dry finger foods, rice or rice-like foods	4	The food is held in the caregiver's hands. Babies were given very small amounts of solid food multiple times each day.
Asia	Nepal	grains	6	Mothers pre-chewed grains that they were cooking for the rest of the family, mixed them with water or butter, and used their fingers to put the food in their baby's' mouth. Babies in Hindu families were fed rice at the age of 3 weeks in the celebration of Annaprashana ( in Nepal Pasni), but did not regularly eat food until later. Many start with rice porridge (jaulo) and powdered cereals porridge(lito). Many mothers work on farms, and the introduction of solid foods often happened at the start of busy agricultural times.
Asia	Philippines	lugao (a rice porridge), mashed fruits or vegetables, or soft bread	3 to 6	
Oceania	Papua New Guinea	mashed papaya, sweet potato, pumpkin, and banana	6 to 12	Water, vegetable broth and peeled sugar cane were given to young infants as an extra source of fluids. Liquids were given in a bowl, cup, or bamboo straw. Taro and meat were withheld until the baby was about a year old. Traditionally, babies were not given solid foods until they could walk.
Oceania	Solomon Islands	pre-chewed taro with water or sweet potato cooked in coconut milk	0 to 9	Many mothers began feeding their babies solid foods within 1 to 2 months after birth; they thoroughly chew the food and feed it mouth-to-mouth for the first few months. This was also a common practice for feeding a hungry baby if the mother was temporarily unavailable. Sukuru mothers usually began feeding solid foods between 6 and 9 months. Some fed babies mouth-to-mouth; others pre-chewed, boiled, or mashed the food and gave it to the baby in a spoon or the baby's hand.
Oceania	Trobriand Islands	soup, then mashed or pre-chewed yams or taro	1	
North America	USA	infant cereal, and later pureed fruits or vegetables	2 to 6	Cereal was mixed with infant formula and given in a bottle, or fed to the baby with a spoon. Poor women began feeding solid foods much earlier than wealthier women.

== Market ==
According to Zion Market Research, the market size for baby food in the United States is estimated to be $53 billion in 2018 and growing to $76 billion by 2021.

Commercial baby food in the United States is dominated by Gerber, which had about 70% of the American market share in 1996. Beechnut had about 15% of the market, and Heinz had about 10%. Heinz's Earth's Best, the largest brand of organic baby food, had about 2% of the American market share.

In Australia, Canada, and New Zealand, Heinz had about 90% of the market share in 1996. Heinz is also the market leader in the UK, Italy, and several eastern European countries.

=== Controversies ===
Some commercial baby foods have been criticized for their contents and cost. Over the decades, there have been multiple recalls of baby foods because of concerns about contamination or spoilage. In 1984 and 1986, Gerber was involved in a scandal over glass baby food jars breaking in transit, which dramatically affected its sales and profitability, although the US Food and Drug Administration later concluded that the company was not at fault. In 1987, Beechnut paid US$25 million to resolve charges of selling adulterated apple juice in the early 1980s. In 2011, Nestlé France decided to recall a batch of P'tit pot baby food as a precautionary measure after a customer reportedly found glass shards in one of their jars. An investigation into the incident's scope led the company to conclude that it had been an isolated occurrence and that the rest of the batch had not been affected.

=== Pesticides ===
The U.S. Environmental Protection Agency is required by law to ensure that pesticide residues do not harm babies and children. Almost 40% of baby foods sold in stores in the U.S. contain toxic pesticides, according to a 2023 study by the Environmental Working Group, an American non-profit environmental research and advocacy organization. The most common pesticide residues found in the baby foods were acetamiprid, a neonicotinoid insecticide that is known to be harmful to humans and bees, and captan, a fungicide of the phthalimide class that has been correlated to cancer. None of the organic baby foods tested in the same study were found to contain pesticides.

== See also ==
- Breastfeeding
  - Breastmilk
- Infant formula
- Pablum
- International Code of Marketing of Breast-milk Substitutes
- Nestlé boycott
- Organic Baby Products
