= Mayana Zatz =

Brazilian geneticist (born 1947)

- מאיינה זץ
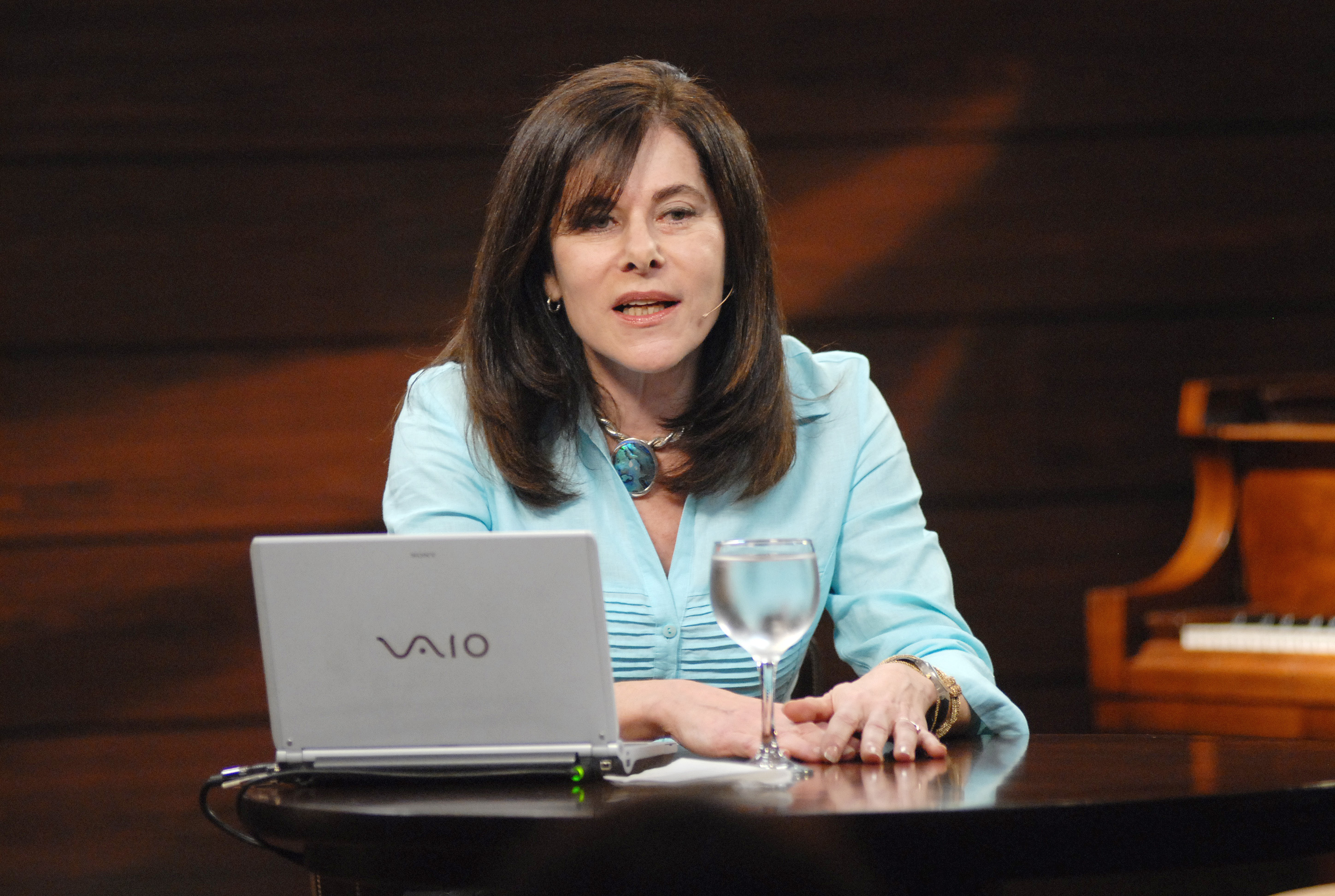
- Zatz in 2007
- Born: 16 July 1947 (age 79); Tel Aviv, Mandatory Palestine
- Education: University of São Paulo
- Awards: National Order of Scientific Merit (2000); L'Oréal-UNESCO For Women in Science Awards (2001); Premio México de Ciencia y Tecnología (2008)
- Scientific career
- Fields: Biochemistry, molecular biology, genetics
- Doctoral advisor: Oswaldo Frota-Pessoa

Mayana Zatz (Hebrew: מאיינה זץ; born July 16, 1947) is a Brazilian molecular biologist and geneticist. She is a professor at the University of São Paulo, is its Research dean.

== Biography ==
Professor Zatz's accomplishments have been recognized and she has received many awards and prizes, including the 2000 L'Oréal-UNESCO Awards for Women in Science and Claudia Magazine's Woman of the Year Award in 2001.

Born in Israel in 1947, she moved to France with her family and lived there until the age of seven years. Her father, Lony Eden (1912-1984) was from Dorohoi, Romania and her mother Ella Kott Eden (b.1914) was from Warsaw. In 1939, her parents fled the Wehrmacht’s advance and arrived in Israel where Mayana and her sister were born. Mayana arrived in Brazil with her family in 1955.

Mayana obtained a BA in Biology at University of São Paulo in 1968, a M.Sc. and a D.Sc. in Biological Sciences from University of São Paulo in 1970 and 1974, respectively, her post-doctorate in Medical Genetics at the University of California at Los Angeles (UCLA), in 1977, and her livre-docência from University of São Paulo, in 1987. Mayana became interested in the study of muscular dystrophies when she was at college and followed a patient from a family with a high incidence of the condition, and who wanted to start a family.

In 1969, Dr Zatz started her work in genetic counseling in families which were carriers of neuromuscular diseases, in order to evaluate as well as to inform the risk of having offspring with a similar problem. Twelve years later she contacted these same families again, and found that most of the high risk families had avoided having children. On the other hand, Mayana was shocked to see the way the sick children born during that period had been abandoned. These children, who generally had normal mental development but whose muscular problems were not treated, neither went to school nor underwent physical therapy.

Therefore, in 1981, Mayana and her team founded the Brazilian Association of Muscular Dystrophy (ABIM) at the Institute of Bioscience of the USP. Seven years later she obtained the physical location for the organization's headquarters. ABIM, which was the first center for assistance of dystrophy carriers in Latin America, weekly treats ca. 100 children and adolescents divided into daily groups of twenty patients, besides eventual visits adding up to approximately 300 people per month. Since its foundation the organization has assisted over 1,000 (mostly poor) children. They are first screened and upon confirmation of the illness are sent to the association for lifetime treatment. ABIM offers physical therapy, hydrotherapy, recreational activities, activities which stimulate creativity and reasoning, besides psychological group and individual support for the carriers and their relatives.

Currently Mayana is a member of the International Human Genome Project of the Academy of Sciences of the State of São Paulo, and of the Brazilian Academy of Sciences. According to the Institute for Scientific Information, her work has been cited 1,500 times in 102 publications between 1977 and 1997. She has had 173 papers and approximately 150 articles published in foreign magazines such as "Nature Genetics" and "Human Molecular Genetics". Mayana is also columnist of Brazilian Veja Magazine and a recipient of the 2003 TWAS Prize.

Since the beginning of her career Mayana has assisted approximately 16,000 people of families affected by genetic diseases (mostly neuromuscular problems), which is the highest number of cases registered in the world. In the latter part of 1995, Mayana, professor Maria Rita Passos-Bueno, and doctorate student Eloísa de Sá Moreira were the first scientists in the world to find one of the genes related to a dystrophy which affects the arms and legs. They also mapped the gene responsible for the Knobloch syndrome, which causes a type of progressive blindness.
