= José W. F. Valle =

Brazilian physicist

- Born: June 2, 1953 (age 73); Brazil
- Known for: Contributions to theoretical astroparticle and high energy physics, especially neutrino physics
- Awards: Spanish Iberdrola Science & Technology Prize for Theoretical Physics, 1999; Humboldt Prize, 2002; Medal of the Mexican Physical Society, 2014; Mexico Science and Technology Prize, 2018; Margarita Salas Medal, 2025
- Scientific career
- Fields: Physics
- Workplaces: Spanish Council for Scientific Research (CSIC)

José W. F. Valle (born June 2, 1953) is a Spanish physicist.

== Biography ==
Born in Brazil, he earned a PhD in Theoretical Physics from Syracuse University (New York, 1982). In January 1983 he joined the Rutherford Appleton Laboratory, Oxfordshire, UK, as a Research Associate, where he got married with a Spanish geneticist. In 1986 he moved to Spain, joining as a visiting professor at the Autonomous University of Barcelona, and subsequently IFIC (Instituto de Física Corpuscular) at the University of Valencia in 1987. He is a Full Professor at the Spanish Council for Scientific Research CSIC. He is known for his numerous contributions to theoretical astroparticle and high energy physics, especially neutrino physics.

Valle has contributed significantly to the modern theory of neutrino mass. In a groundbreaking work with Joseph Schechter he has provided the first exhaustive discussion of the various mechanisms of neutrino mass generation (including the variants of the seesaw mechanism). The same authors also formulated the Schechter-Valle theorem demonstrating that an observation of neutrinoless double beta decay will necessarily imply neutrinos to be Majorana fermions and vice versa. He also contributed to the correct interpretation of the oscillations of solar and atmospheric neutrinos which led to the physics Nobel Prize 2015 awarded to Arthur B. McDonald and Takaaki Kajita. The discovery of neutrino masses and oscillations can be considered as the only firm indication of the incompleteness of the Standard Model of particle physics with important consequences also for astrophysics and cosmology.

== Honors ==
- Spanish Iberdrola Science & Technology Prize for Theoretical Physics in 1999
- Humboldt Prize 2002
- Medal of the Mexican Physical Society, 2014.
- Premio México de Ciencia y Tecnología 2018

== Publications ==
Particle physics textbook Neutrinos in High Energy and Astroparticle Physics ]

Here is his publication list from the INSPIRE-HEP High Energy Physics database.

== See also ==
- List of theoretical physicists
