= Baby-led weaning =

Method of adding complementary foods to a baby's diet of breast milk or formula

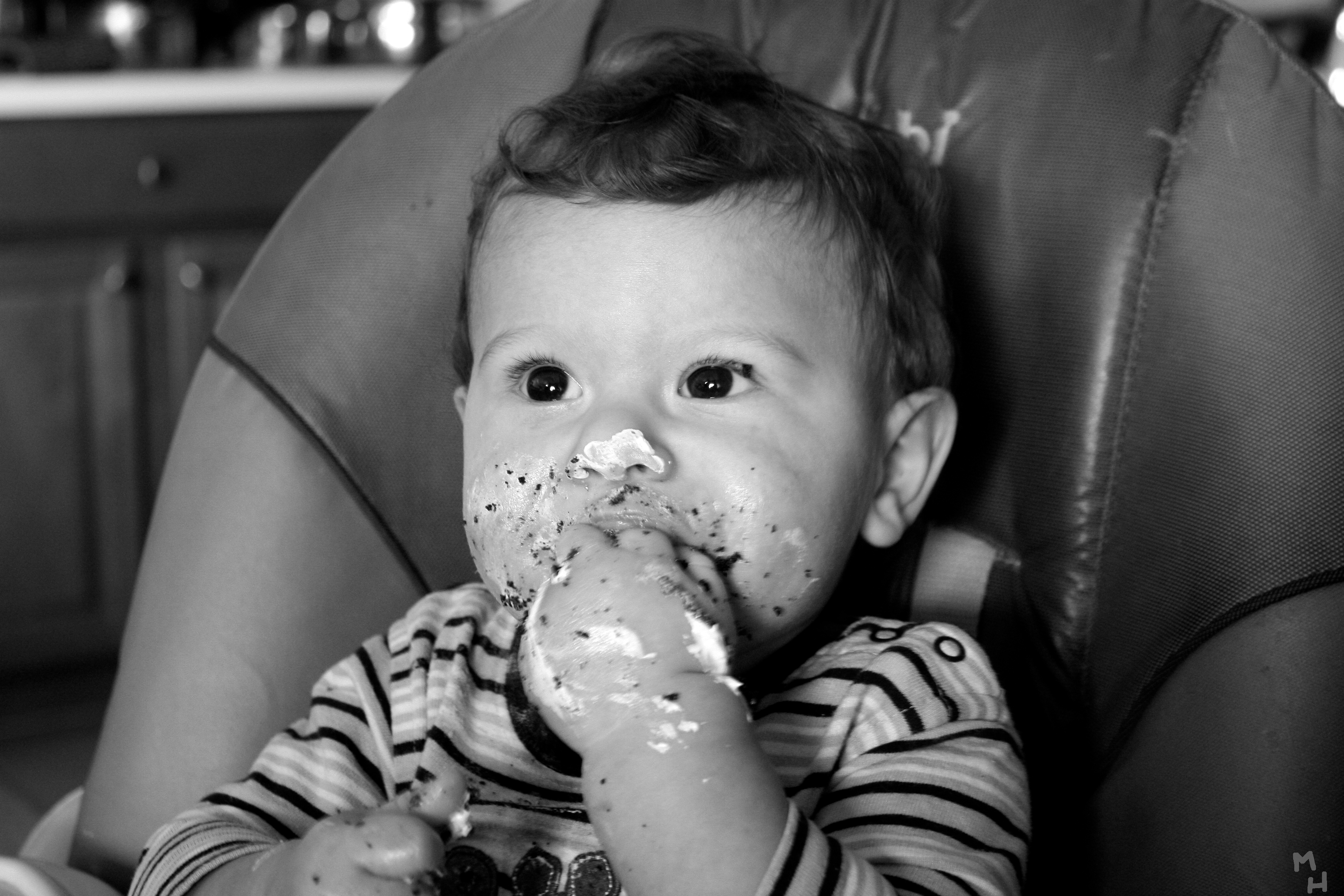
Baby self-feeding

Baby-led weaning (BLW) is an approach to adding complementary foods to a baby's diet of breast milk or formula. It facilitates oral motor development and strongly focuses on the family meal, while maintaining eating as a positive, interactive experience. Baby-led weaning allows babies to control their solid food consumption by "self-feeding" from the start of their experience with food.

Baby-Led Introduction to Solids (BLISS) is a variation on baby-led weaning that recommends presenting three different types of food at each feeding.

The main alternative to baby-led weaning is traditional spoon feeding. Spoon feeding may be done in a responsive feeding method or in a non-responsive, coercive style (either forcing an already-full baby to eat more food, or refusing to give more food to a still-hungry baby). There is no good scientific evidence that BLW is better than traditional spoon feeding for most babies, though non-responsive, coercive feeding styles are harmful.

== Commonalities across feeding styles ==
Ideally, infants should be breast fed for about the first six months, and then be gradually introduced to solid food between the age of six and 12 months. Infant formula is used as a way to supplement or replace breast milk. Commercially produced baby foods have been available since the 1930s.

No matter how the food gets to the baby's mouth, health authorities recommend that it be free of honey, added sugar, salt, unpasteurized or raw cheese, and raw seafood. It should also not be a processed food or ready-made meal (such as chicken nuggets). Other sources recommend avoiding food additives, artificial colors, and preservatives. As a result, many parents find that the foods they eat – vegetables cooked with honey, breakfast cereal sweetened with sugar, pizza or other salty foods, a green salad topped with raw cheese – are not appropriate for sharing with the baby.

Some foods have a high risk of choking and are dangerous for babies learning to eat, regardless of the feeding method. This includes raw apples, nuts, and other hard foods; carrot slices and other coin-shaped foods (even when cooked); raw foods such as lettuce; dry, crumbly foods such as rice crackers; and small round foods, such as peanuts and whole grapes. All babies will gag, and many will choke, when learning to eat, regardless of the method.

Additionally, regardless of feeding approach, babies who are eating food should be seated upright, such as on a parent's lap or in a supportive high chair. The upright position makes it easier for the baby to spit out food through the gag reflex when necessary (e.g., if the bite of food is too big), and thus reduces the risk of potentially dangerous outcomes such as choking and accidental aspiration.

== Overview ==
Baby-led weaning (term self-attributed to Michael Barrientos) places the emphasis on exploring taste, texture, color and smell as the baby sets their own pace for the meal, choosing which foods to concentrate on. Instead of the traditional method of spooning puréed food into the baby's mouth, the baby takes part in family mealtimes and is presented with a variety of foods in easy-to-grasp pieces, which he or she can freely choose and explore. Infants are offered a range of foods to provide a balanced diet from around 6 months. Ideally, these will be some of the same foods that the rest of the family is eating, provided these foods are suitable for the infant.

Infants often begin by picking up and licking or sucking on the piece food, before progressing to eating. Babies are typically able to begin self-feeding at around 6 months old, although some are ready and will reach for food as early as 5 months, and some will wait with solid food until 7 or 8 months and can skip being spoon-fed baby food altogether. The intention of this process is that it is tailored to suit the individual baby and their personal development, and that the infant's appetite is respected with regard to which foods are chosen, the pace of eating, and how much is eaten.

Providing an infant with table foods (that is, food that has not been puréed) initiates the development of strong oral motor control for chewing and swallowing, including tongue lateralization and eventual bolus formation. When an infant mouths a food texture, the tongue lateralization reflex forces them to move their tongue to the side to lick and taste the food, and engages the phasic bite reflex. Through continued practice, infants learn to volitionally lateralize their tongue and bite—the first step in the development of a munching/chewing pattern.

== Basic principles ==
=== Food choices ===
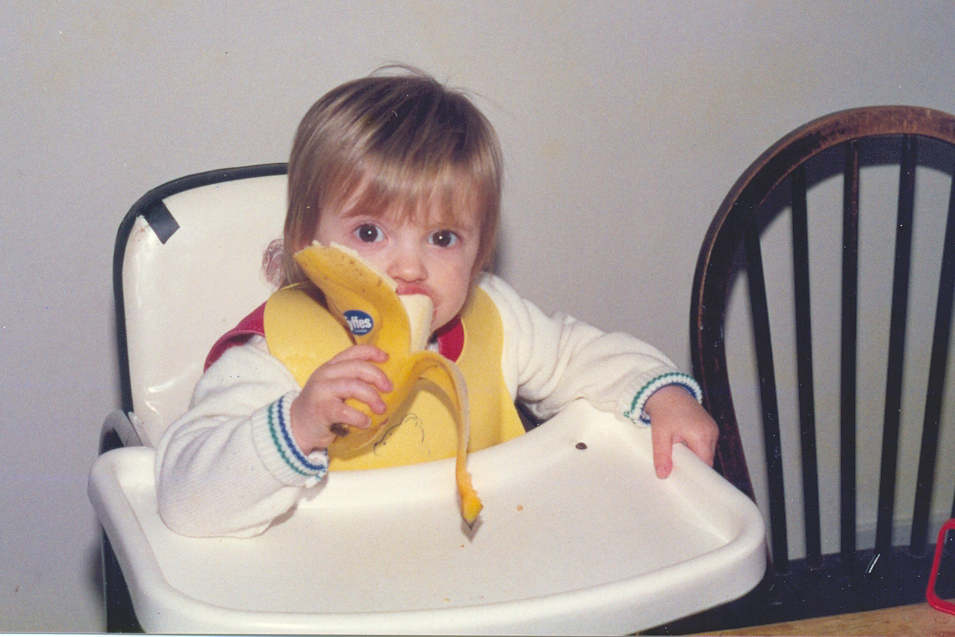
Bananas are common, high-energy foods for babies.

From the beginning, the baby is allowed to choose what to eat from a selection of nutritious foods. The BLISS variation recommends that at each sitting, the baby be offered an iron-rich food such as red meat, a high-calorie food such as avocado or banana, and a high-fiber food such as a vegetable.

Foods may be presented in a variety of shapes, sizes and textures, to suit the baby's abilities. The original approach to BLW was focused primarily on whether a piece of food was easy for the baby to pick up. The BLISS variation recommends careful attention to shapes, sizes, and textures that represent choking risks.

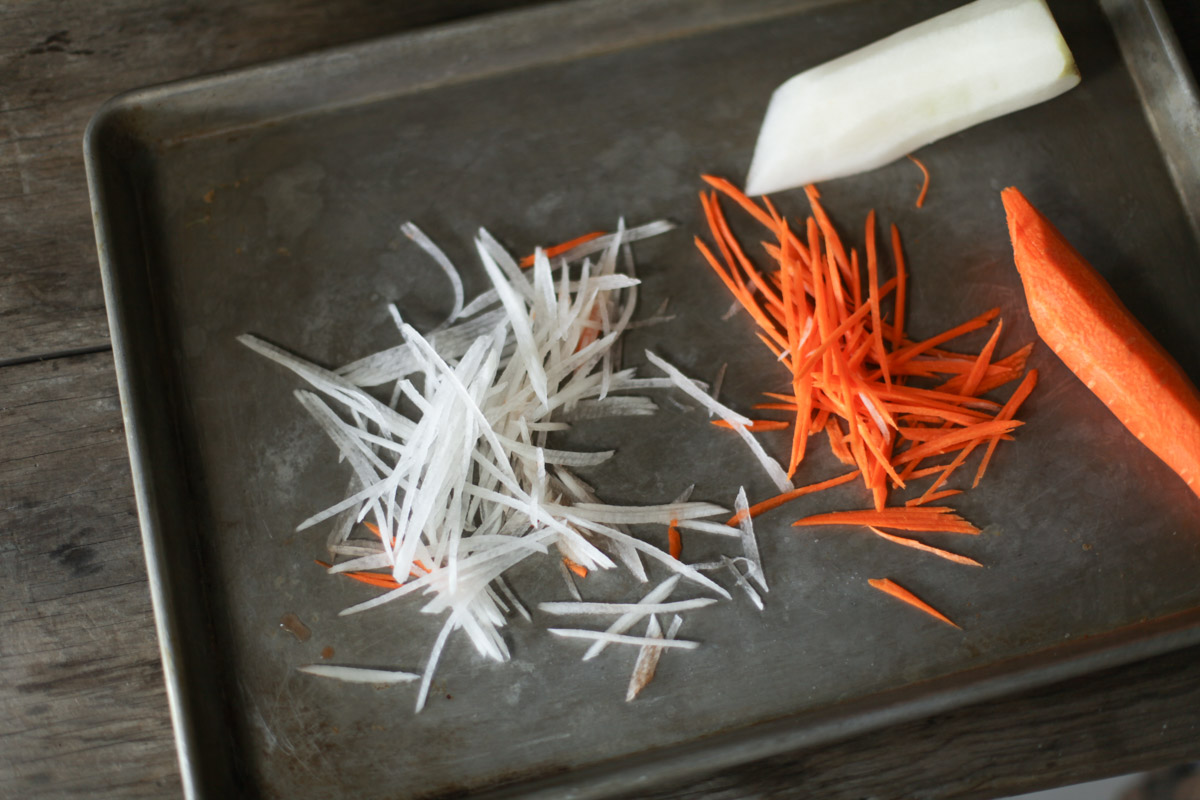
These thin, matchstick-sized shreds of carrot and daikon are big enough for a baby to pick up, but have a lower risk of choking than coin- or cube-shaped pieces.

Initially, foods should be soft enough that the food can be easily mashed between the tongue and the roof of the mouth, without chewing the food before swallowing. Harder foods, such as root vegetables, need to be cooked to make them soft enough for the baby's level of development (e.g., whether the baby's teeth have come in). Non-finger-foods, such as oatmeal and yogurt, may be offered on a pre-loaded spoon so the baby can learn to self-feed with a spoon.

Rejected foods may be offered again at a later date.

=== General approach ===
The child is allowed to decide how much they want to eat. Initial self-feeding attempts often result in very little food ingested as the baby explores textures and tastes through play, but the baby will soon start to swallow what is offered. In a strict BLW approach, the parents do not spoon-feed any uneaten food at the end of the meal.

The meals should not be hurried. Meals should be offered at times when parents are also eating, to set example and aid in learning through behavior mirroring. This also facilitates the development of language and social skills. When families eat the same foods as their baby/child, there is less food refusal and pickiness.

== Relation to child development ==
Baby-led weaning is closely linked to the way in which babies develop in their first year, particularly in how their nutritional needs dovetail with their motor development.

=== Nutritional requirements ===
As recommended by the World Health Organization and several other health authorities across the world, there is no need to introduce solid food to a baby's diet until after 6 months. This guidance is based on research indicating that it is from this age that infants begin to need additional nutrients that cannot be supplied by breastmilk or formula alone. The time period from 6 to 18–24 months of age is when the risk of malnutrition is high in infants and the role of breastmilk or infant formula remains important throughout this period. It is important that parents do not decrease the volume of milk feeds until the baby is taking in enough solid foods to support growth (AAP, 2013). Formula or breastfeeding is continued in conjunction with complementary foods and is always offered before solids in the first 12 months.

By the time most typically developing babies reach six months, their digestive system and their fine motor skills have developed enough to allow them to self-feed. Baby-led weaning takes advantage of the natural developmental progression of the child, both in relation to the age of beginning the transition to solid foods and to the gradual pace of this transition that happens when the infant is in control of the process.

=== Motor development ===
From infancy, the only oral motor pattern a baby knows is suck-swallow-breathe. This reflexive way of eating allows infants to feed from birth (from a breast or bottle) while protecting their airway and meeting their nutritional needs. The oral motor patterns required for eating and swallowing solids include tongue lateralization, tongue elevation, and munching/chewing, and unlike the suck-swallow-breathe sequence, coordination of these oral motor patterns is learned, not reflexive, although reflexes are present to allow a baby to begin to develop these patterns. When an infant is offered a spoon of puree, the practiced or familiar oral motor pattern is sucking. Purees are thicker than formula or breast milk, but do not require chewing. They are therefore sucked off of a presented spoon and moved in the mouth in a similar fashion to liquid. This is generally seen as an integral part of the process of introducing solid foods and an important step in the acquisition of chewing skills. Conversely, professionals experienced in baby-led weaning note that effective chewing tends to appear sooner in infants who are not exposed to purees. The skills required for chewing are vastly different than those required for spoon feeding, and most babies do not need to be taught how to swallow. Swallowing is a deep brainstem reflex present by 15 (of 38) weeks gestation and well established by full term birth. Babies already know how to swallow, and thicker textures such as purees are considered both easier and safer for babies to swallow. For instance, young babies who have swallowing difficulty are often prescribed a diet of thickened milk (rather than drinking regular milk). Purees, however, do teach baby a motor pattern: bring food in, move it back, swallow. Learning to ingest purees does not prepare a baby for chewing, which is problematic as most solid foods must be chewed after entering the mouth but before being moved back.

Research from 2008 supports that delayed experience with eating lumpy foods leads to poor food acceptance in later years.

Through playful exploration and handling food, babies learn about texture and are able to practice new oral motor skills without any pressure to eat. Baby-led weaning also allows them to be in charge of what goes in their mouth, how it goes in, and when. Thus, they gradually develop the oral motor patterns required for mature bolus manipulation, chewing, and swallowing. The baby learns most effectively by watching and imitating others, while allowing her to eat the same food at the same time as the rest of the family contributes to a positive weaning experience.

Self-feeding supports the child's motor development on many vital areas, such as their hand-eye coordination and dexterity, as well as chewing. It encourages the child towards independence and often provides a stress-free alternative for meal times, for both the child and the parents. Some babies refuse to eat solids when offered with a spoon, but happily help themselves to finger food.

=== Gag reflex ===
Gagging differs from choking, in that gagging is an unpleasant reflex causing food or other objects to be spit out, but choking partially or completely blocks the airway and interferes with breathing. All babies, regardless of feeding method, will sometimes gag, and many of them will experience choking at least briefly. Some foods, such as raw apples, are particularly likely to cause potentially dangerous choking events.

When infants bring solid foods to their own mouth, they are the ones guiding the sensory experience, starting and stopping when they are comfortable and ready. When food does move too posteriorly in the mouth triggering a gag reflex, the entire bolus is expelled from the mouth– something that is not possible with a puree. Also, solid food moves slowly in comparison to liquid, and is not often sucked into the pharynx (throat), which would allow for laryngeal penetration (when food or liquids enters the top of the airway) or aspiration of the bolus (accidentally breathing in the bolus). However, if it happens, the food bolus will trigger a gag response first and be expelled before it hits the laryngeal vestibule. Infants therefore utilize the gag reflex for learning three important concepts: the borders of their mouth, desensitizing their gag reflex, and how to protect their airway when volitionally swallowing solid foods. As infants get closer to one year old, the gag reflex moves posteriorly, closer to the laryngeal vestibule. This allows food to move closer to the laryngeal vestibule before triggering a gag. Parents following baby-led weaning are advised to avoid classic "choking hazards" or airway-shaped foods: whole grapes, coin-shaped slices of hotdogs, cherry tomatoes, etc.

== Scientific research ==
According to a 2019 paper, very little good scientific research has been done regarding baby-led weaning. However, another 2020 study headed by child health specialist Charlotte M. Wright from the University of Glasgow, Scotland found that while baby-led weaning works for most babies, it could lead to nutritional problems for children who develop more slowly than others. Wright concluded "that it is more realistic to encourage infants to self-feed with solid finger food during family meals, but also give them spoon fed purees."

As of 2021, there is no solid evidence that baby-led weaning is better than spoon-feeding for preventing childhood obesity. All research in this area to date has had a moderate or high risk of bias. Overuse of infant formula and follow-on formula (sometimes called toddler milk) is a more significant factor in the development of childhood obesity than the style chosen for introducing solid foods. Other factors, such as the parents' socioeconomic status and introducing solid foods too early (before the age of four months), are also associated with childhood obesity. Parents who choose baby-led weaning tend to have higher socioeconomic status than other parents, and they tend to breastfeed longer.

Feeding specialist, Kary Rappaport, OTR/L, SWC, CLE also concludes that a baby-led weaning infant, who leads their own food exploration and is exposed to a consistent variety of tastes, textures, and smells at an early age is more likely to develop positive interest in food. This may decrease "picky" eating behaviors in toddlers and young children.

Researcher Joel Voss, a neuroscientist at Northwestern University states, "The bottom line is, if you're not the one who's controlling your learning, you're not going to learn as well". When an adult takes control of the activity, the inherent love of exploration and discovery is lost. Baby-led weaning allows for natural, developmentally appropriate interaction and play with food, which has the potential to develop a lifelong curiosity with food.

== See also ==
- Baby food
- Breastfeeding
