= María Ángela Nieto =

Spanish scientist (born 1960)

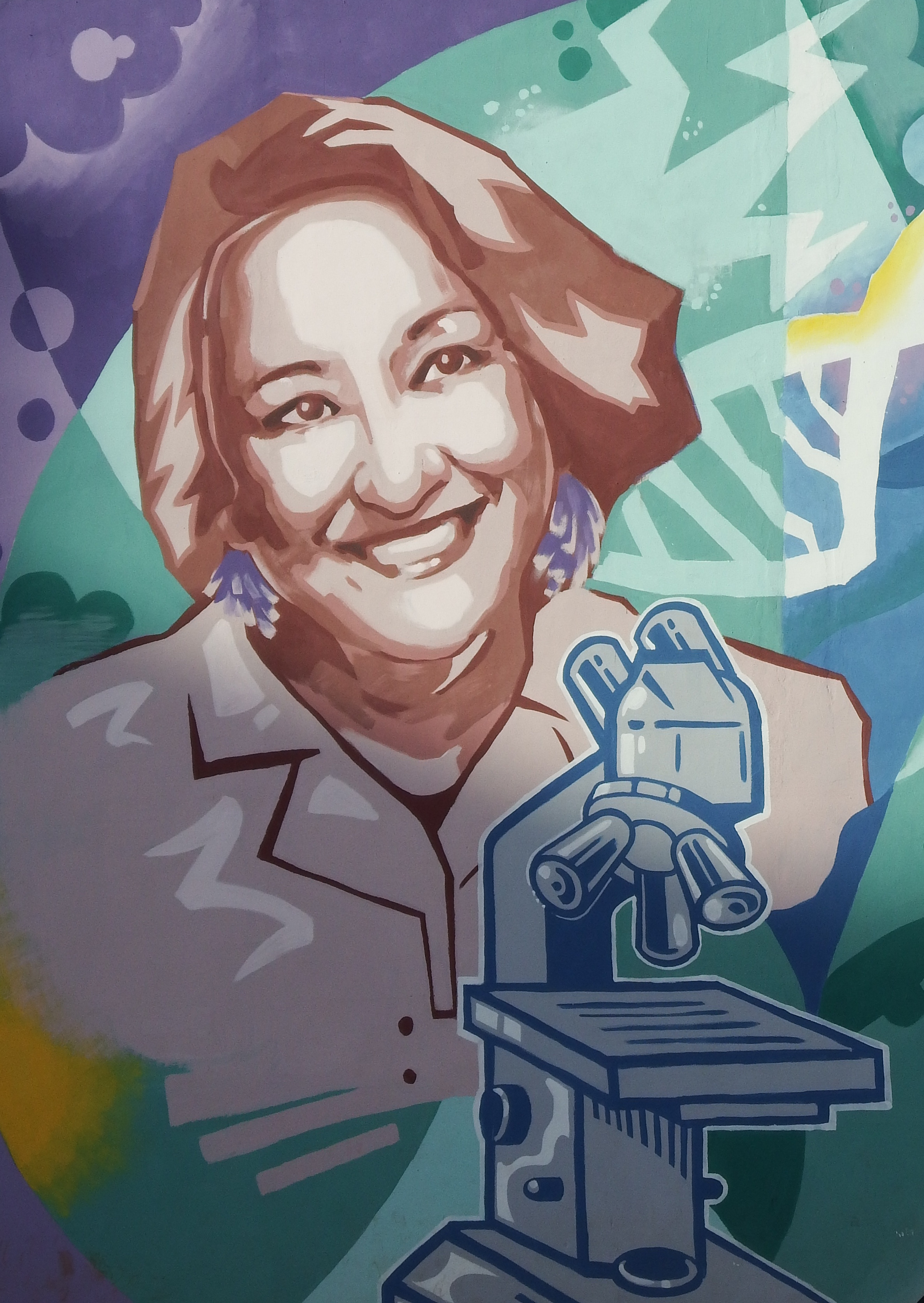
- Mural painting of María Ángela Nieto
- Born: March 1, 1960 (age 66); Madrid
- Education: Universidad Autónoma de Madrid
- Awards: Rey Jaime I Award; Premio México de Ciencia y Tecnología; L'Oréal-UNESCO For Women in Science Awards; National Research Award
- Scientific career
- Fields: Biochemistry; Molecular Biology
- Workplaces: Instituto de Neurociencias CSIC-UMH
- Doctoral advisor: Enrique Palacián Gil
- Website: zfin.org/ZDB-LAB-110912-2

María Ángela Nieto Toledano (Madrid, March 1, 1960) is a Spanish scientist, doctor in Biochemistry and Molecular Biology. She is recognized for her groundbreaking work in the fields of developmental biology and cellular biology.

She works at the Institute for Neurosciences CSIC-UMH, a joint center of the Spanish National Research Council (CSIC) and the Miguel Hernández University of Elche (UMH).

== Career ==
She received her doctorate from the Universidad Autónoma de Madrid in 1987 for his work on interactions of nucleic acid proteins.

In 1988 she worked at the Instituto de Investigaciones Biomédicas in Madrid, to study programmed cell death.

In 1989, she joined the National Institute for Medical Research in London, working with David Wilkinson where she isolated a number of genes involved in the morphogenesis of the nervous system. In 1993 In 1993, she obtained a position of Staff Scientist at the Cajal Institute in Madrid. Since then she has led a research group interested in cell movements during embryo development and adult pathologies.

In 2000, she was promoted to director of the Developmental Neurobiology Department and elected member of the European Molecular Biology Organization.

In 2004 Nieto was promoted to research professor. That same year, she moved to the Institute for Neurosciences (CSIC-UMH) in Alicante.

Nieto's has done research on epithelial-to-mesenchymal transition (EMT), a process where epithelial cells, which are tightly connected and stationary, transition into mesenchymal cells, which are more mobile and invasive. This phenomenon is critical in understanding developmental processes, as well as in cancer metastasis, tissue regeneration and disease in adults.

Her research on the SNAI1 gene family, its activation and relationship with disease has been well received, including its involvement in the formation of different tissues and organs during embryonic development, and how its reactivation in later developmental stages or in adulthood can result in various illness, such as tumor progression, fibrosis, and bone disease.

Nieto's contributions have been fundamental in explaining how cells change their identity during development, tissue repair, and in diseases like cancer. Her work has helped clarify the role of EMT in the progression of various cancers, making her a key figure in cancer biology research.

EMT was initially accepted by developmental biologists but not by oncologists. However, it has become one of the main cancer research subjects. (discussed in Nieto, Ann. Rev. Cell Dev. Biol., 2011 and Nieto et al., Cell, 2016).

== Memberships ==
- Member of the Spanish Royal Academy of Sciences since 2020.
- Member of the Academia Europaea.
- Member of the European Molecular Biology Organization (EMBO).
- President of the International Society for Developmental Biologists (ISDB).
- Scientific delegate for Spain in the European Molecular Biology Organization (EMBO), the European Molecular Biology Laboratory (EMBL) and the European Molecular Biology Conference (EMBC).
- Member of the Board of Directors of the International Society of Differentiation.
- Member of the scientific and technical committee of the State Research Agency (AEI).
- Member of the High Advisory Council of the Generalitat Valenciana.
- Member of the science committee of the Institut Curie. Paris; of the Institut de Genomique Fonctionelle (IGFL), Lyon; of the Institut Biologie du Développement (Marseille); of the Dept. Cell & Dev. Biol., University of Dundee, UK; of the Spanish National Cancer Research Centre (CNIO); and of the Centre for Genomic Regulation (CRG), Barcelona.
- Full Member of the Advisory Committee on Singular Infrastructures (CAIS)-Mineco. (Council for Scientific, Technological, and Innovation Policy), Madrid.
- Member of the Editorial Boards of EMBO J, EMBO reports; Current Opinion in Genetics and Development; Mechanism of Development; Gene Expression Patterns and Int. J. Developmental Biology.
- President of the Spanish Society for Developmental Biology.

== Awards and recognition ==
- 2004: Award from the Carmen and Severo Ochoa foundation.
- 2005: Francisco Cobos Foundation Award in Biomedical research.
- 2006: Alberto Sols Award for 'Best research work'.
- 2009: Rey Jaime I Award.
- 2015: Scientific merit distinction at the Premios 9 d'Octubre (Generalitat Valenciana).
- 2015: Selección Española de la Ciencia (Spanish Selection of Science).
- 2016: Nephrology research award; Fundación Renal Española IAT
- 2017: Rotary Club Alicante Award
- 2017: Premio México de Ciencia y Tecnología by the Mexican Government.
- 2018: Lilly Foundation award for Preclinic Biomedical Research.
- 2018: Cancer Research Award, by the Asociación Española de Investigación sobre el Cáncer.
- 2018: Premio Alberto Sols for 'Best research work' 2016–2017.
- 2019: IMPORTANTES Award from the Información newspaper.
- 2019: National Research Award 'Santiago Ramón y Cajal' in Biology, from the Spanish Government.
- 2021: L'Oréal-UNESCO For Women in Science Awards for Europe. (Note: She's the second Spanish woman to have been given this award.)
