= Antonio García-Bellido =

Spanish developmental biologist (1936–2025)

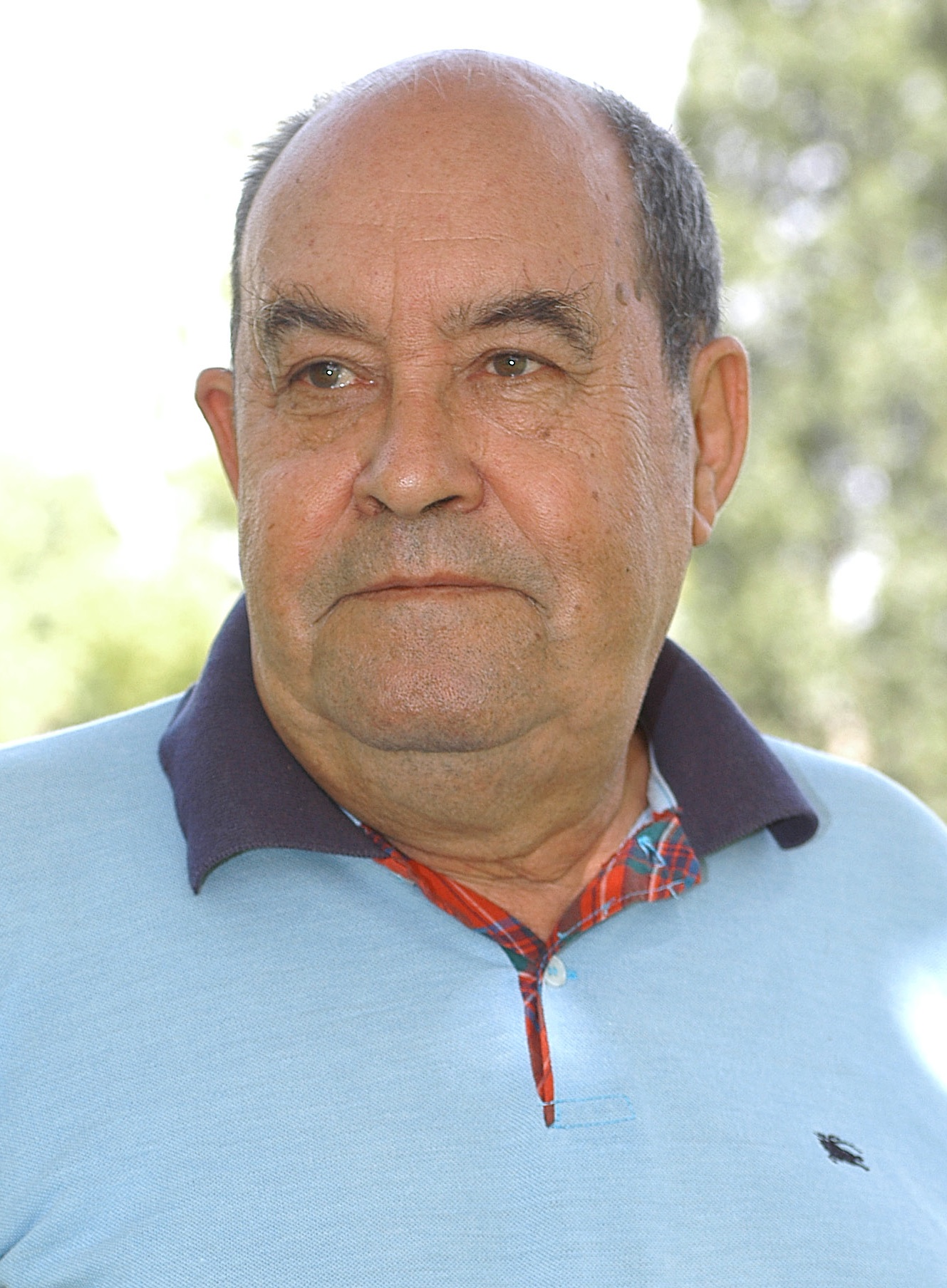
- Born: Antonio García-Bellido y García de Diego; 30 April 1936; Madrid, Spain
- Died: 10 November 2025 (aged 89)
- Education: Complutense University of Madrid; University of Cambridge
- Awards: Premio México de Ciencia y Tecnología (2006)
- Scientific career
- Doctoral students: Ginés Morata

Antonio García-Bellido y García de Diego ForMemRS (30 April 1936 – 10 November 2025) was a Spanish developmental biologist. His ideas and new approaches to the problem of development have been followed and pursued by many researchers worldwide. García-Bellido was research professor at the Spanish National Research Council from 1974, conducted research at the Center for Molecular Biology in Madrid for over 30 years, and supervised 22 PhD students. He was elected as a Foreign Member of the Royal Society in 1986 and as an International Member of the National Academy of Sciences in 1987. In 2012, he was awarded the Lifetime Achievement Award from the Society for Developmental Biology. He died on 10 November 2025, at the age of 89.
