= Juan Carlos Castilla (marine biologist) =

Chilean marine biologist

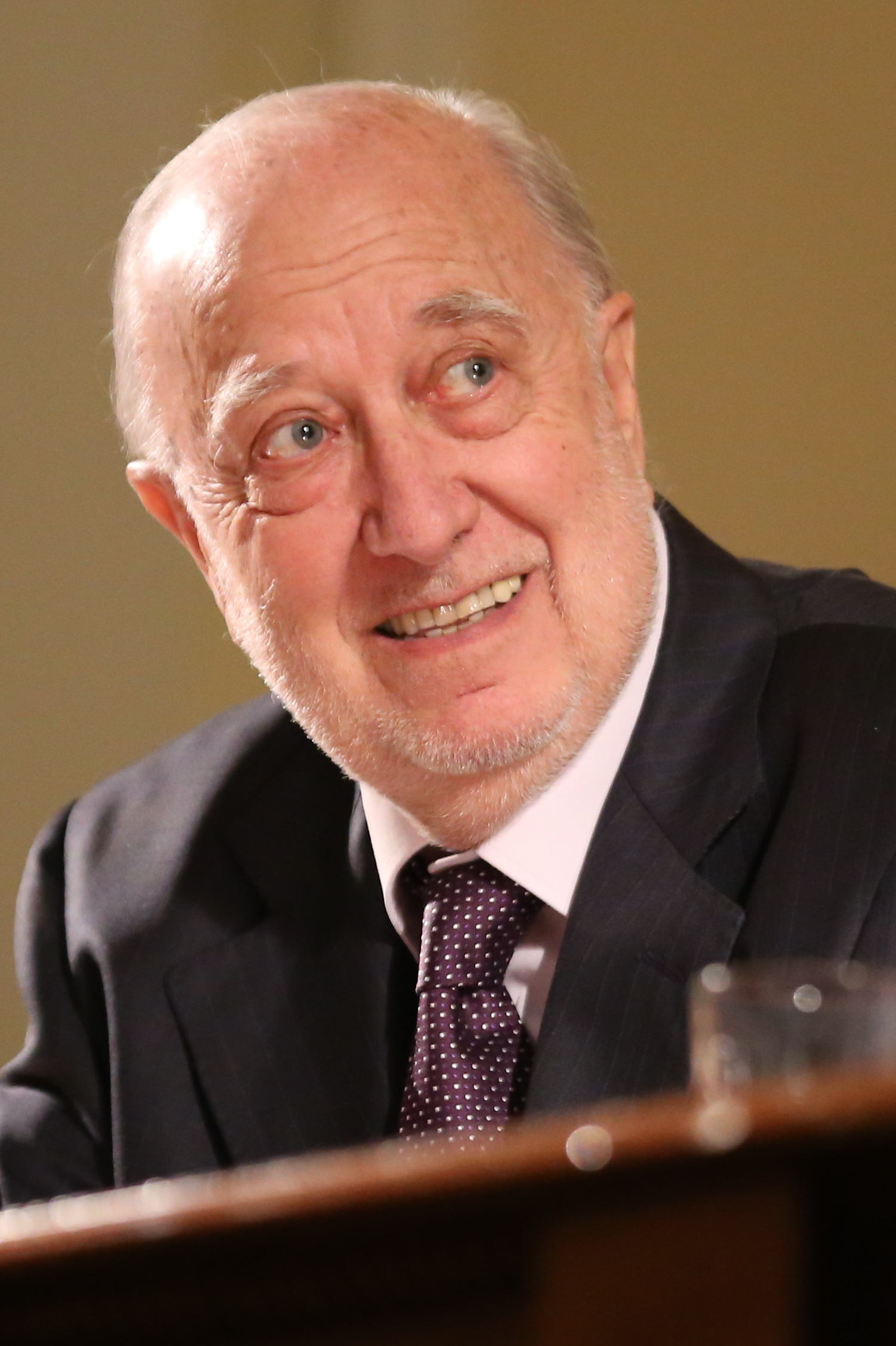
- Education: University of Wales
- Awards: Premio México de Ciencia y Tecnología (2012); BBVA International Prize in Ecology and Conservation

Juan Carlos Castilla Zenobi (born in Chile, 1940) is a marine biologist. He received his PhD from the University of Wales. Since 1965, he has been a faculty member at the Pontificia Universidad Católica de Chile. In 1985, he published a paper on a study which focused on a part of the Chilean coastline from which humans had been excluded. He is a recipient of the 1996 TWAS Prize and the 2011 Ramon Margalef Prize in Ecology.

== Education ==
Castilla was inspired by his marine biology professor, Patricio Sanchez, during his undergraduate years. He and several other students in the class were invited to join Sanchez in studying marine fauna at Chile's seashores. This research helped grow Castilla's interest in marine biology which he pursued a Ph.D in at the University College of North Wales. His mentor at the university was Dennis Crisp, a famous marine biologist of the time.

== Early research and impact ==
One of Castilla's first research studies involved the Concholepas concholepas. He aimed to study the impact of human influences on the Concholepas population. Within two years of excluding humans from one area, the population of Concholepas increased. Using the results from this study, Castilla wanted to apply his findings to a real life scenario. With the Chilean government, Castilla implemented "comanagement" sections of the seashore. Castilla collected 3 years of data and found success in areas that were comanaged compared to the all-access areas. This led Castilla and other researchers to lobby the Chilean government into enforcing comanagement on a broader scale.
