= Ginés Morata =

Spanish biologist and professor (born 1945)

Ginés Morata ForMemRS
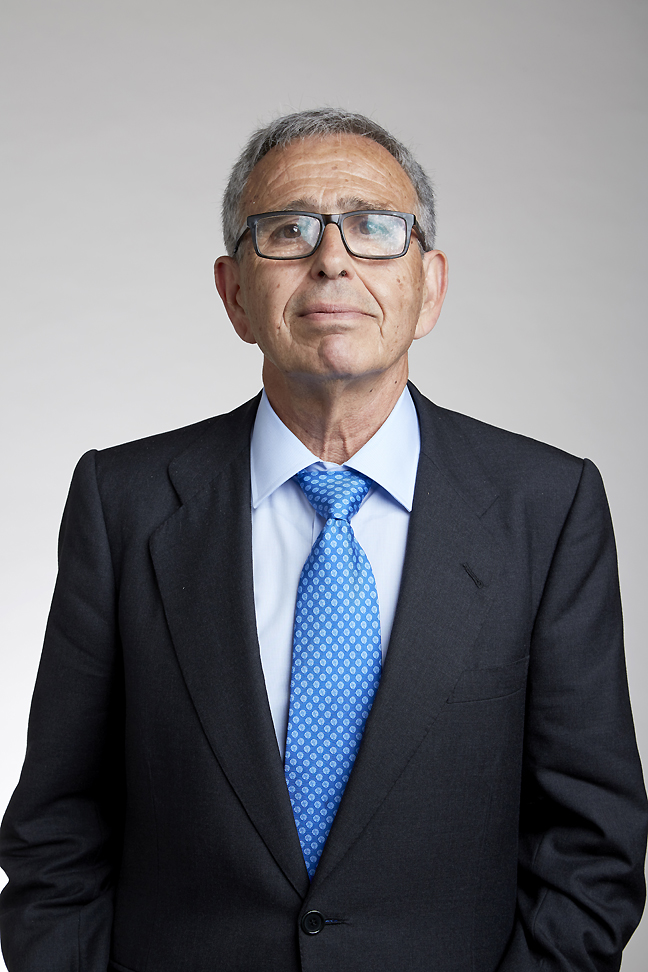
- Morata in 2017
- Born: Ginés Morata Pérez; 1945 (age 80–81); Rioja (Almería), Spain
- Education: Complutense University of Madrid (PhD)
- Awards: Prince of Asturias Prize
- Scientific career
- Workplaces: Autonomous University of Madrid; University of Cambridge
- Thesis: Herencia celular de la determinación en Drosophila (1973)
- Doctoral advisor: Antonio García-Bellido
- Website: www.cbm.uam.es/joomla-rl/index.php/en/scientific-departments?id=750

Ginés Morata Pérez is a Spanish biologist who is Research Professor at the Autonomous University of Madrid in Spain and an expert in developmental biology of the fruit fly (Drosophila), a specialty he has worked on for over 40 years.

== Education ==
Morata was educated at the Universidad Laboral de Sevilla and the Complutense University of Madrid. He was awarded a PhD in 1973 for research on the heredity in the fruit fly Drosophila supervised by Antonio García-Bellido.

== Career and research ==
As of 2017, his research focuses on cell competition, especially in relation to apoptosis and carcinogenesis. His lab also does experimental analysis of regeneration in the imaginal discs.

Morata has been involved in several major discoveries, including the discovery of developmental compartments, the phenomenon of cell competition, the connection between genes and compartments, the elucidation of the structure of the Hox gene complex, and the discovery of mitogenic signalling by apoptotic cells. He worked for several years in the United Kingdom, doing postdoctoral research at the Laboratory of Molecular Biology (LMB) of the Medical Research Council (MRC) at the University of Cambridge with Peter Lawrence.

=== Awards and honours ===
He has been awarded numerous honorary doctorates and prizes, including the Spanish National Prize for Research in Biology (2002), the Mexico Prize for Science and Technology (2004) and the Prince of Asturias Prize for Science and Technology (2007). He was elected a Foreign Member of the Royal Society (ForMemRS) in 2017. In 2018, he was elected a foreign associate of the U.S. National Academy of Sciences.
