= Institute of Nutrition of Central America and Panama =

Central American supranational institution

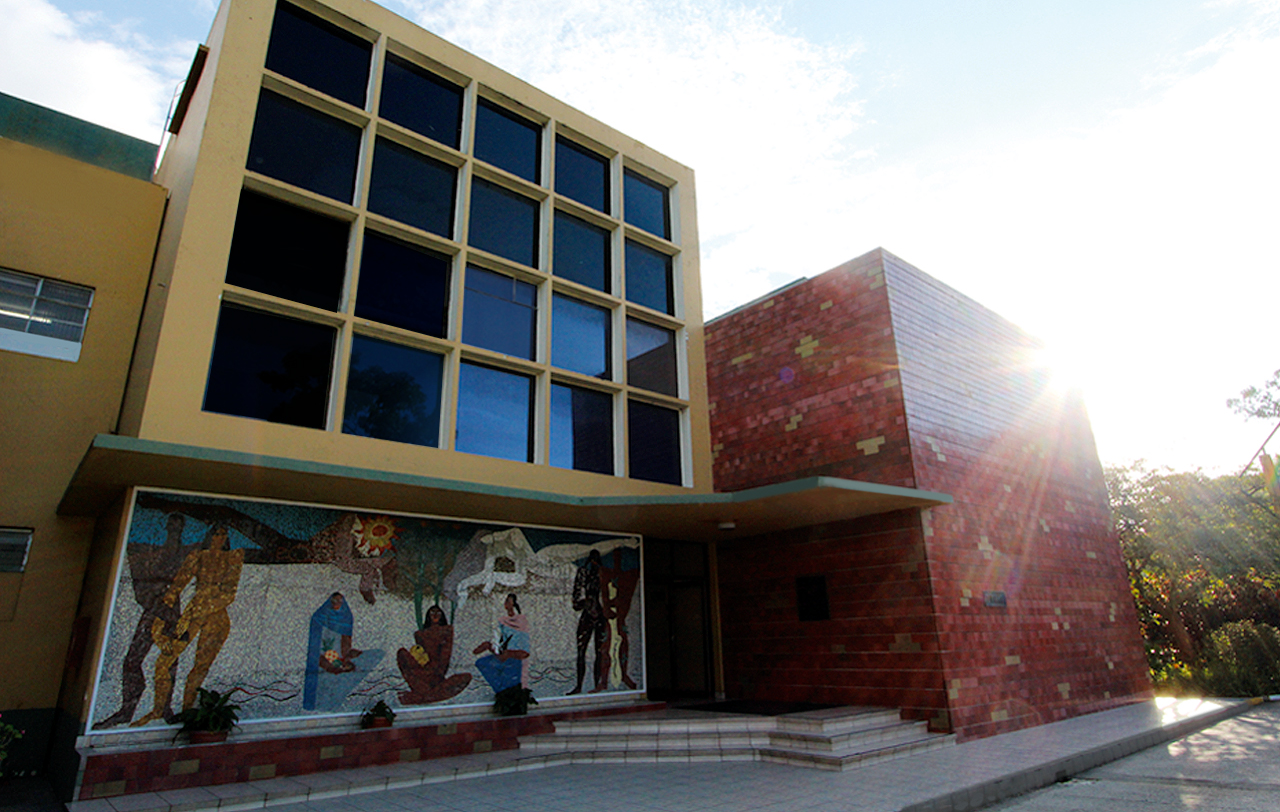
- Headquarters
- Abbreviation: INCAP
- Formation: 1947
- Headquarters: Guatemala City, Guatemala
- Region served: The 8 SICA member states: Belize, Costa Rica, Dominican Republic, El Salvador, Guatemala, Honduras, Nicaragua, Panama
- Director: José Renán De León Cáceres (2020–24)
- Website: www.incap.int

The Institute of Nutrition of Central America and Panama, short INCAP (Spanish: Instituto de Nutrición de Centro América y Panamá) is a supranational institution of the Central American Integration System (SICA).

In the 1960s, INCAP developed a plant-based drink called Incaparina, made from maize, cottonseed flour and soya bean flour and fortified with vitamins A, B_{1}, B_{2}, B_{3}, calcium, zinc, phosphorus, and lysine (a protein).
