= Peña (surname) =

Origin
- Origin: Old Spanish
- Meaning: "Cliff, Crag, Rock"
- Region of origin: Castile

Peña is a Spanish habitation surname. The origin of the surname can be traced directly to the Middle Ages; the earliest public record of the surname dates to the 13th century in the Valle de Mena (Burgos) in the Kingdom of Castile. The origin of the last name is in present-day Galicia, Spain. The Peñas lived, originally, near a cliff or rocky land. Records indicate that the name derives from the Spanish word peña meaning "rock," "crag" or "cliff."

The bearers of this surname proved their noble descent in the Order of Saint James of the Sword in 1626, 1629, 1651 and 1657; in the Order of Calatrava, in 1657, 1687, 1688, 1700 and 1785; in the Order of Alcántara in 1644 and 1693 and in the Royal and Distinguished Spanish Order of Carlos III, in 1790 and 1838; and many times in the Royal Audiencia and Chancillería of Valladolid; in the Royal Audience of Oviedo, in 1788 and 1795; and in the Royal Company of Midshipmen in 1767.

== Notable Peñas ==
- Alcira de la Peña (1910–1998), Argentine physician and political leader
- Alejandro Peña Esclusa (born 1954), Venezuelan leader of the NGO Fuerza Solidaria and president of the NGO UnoAmérica
- Alfredo Peña (1944–2016), Venezuelan journalist and politician
- Analisa Peña (2006-), New Mexican historian, and educator
- Antonio Peña (disambiguation), several people
- Carlos Peña (disambiguation), several people
- Carlota Garrido de la Peña (1870–1958), Argentine journalist, writer and teacher
- Cristina Peña (born 1976), Spanish actress
- Dan Peña (born 1945), American-Scottish businessman and author
- Elizabeth Peña (1959–2014), American actress
- Ellen Hart Peña (born 1958), American world-class runner and lawyer
- Enrique Peña Nieto (born 1966), President of Mexico (2012–2018)
- Enrique Peña Sánchez (1880–1922), Cuban musician
- Federico Peña (born 1947), American politician
- Felipe Peña Biafore (born 2001), Argentine footballer
- Félix de la Peña, governor of Córdoba Province, Argentina
- Florencia Peña (born 1974), Argentine actress
- Horacio Peña (actor) (born 1943), Argentine actor
- Horacio Peña (author) (born 1936), Nicaraguan author and poet
- Horacio de la Peña (born 1966), Argentine tennis player
- José Peña (born 1987), Venezuelan steeplechaser
- José Francisco Peña Gómez (1937–1998), Politician from the Dominican Republic, leader of the Dominican Revolutionary Party (PRD).
- Lorena Peña (born 1955), Salvadoran politician
- Luis Sáenz Peña (1822–1907), President of Argentina (1892–1895)
- Manuel de la Peña y Peña (1789–1850), president of Mexico (1848)
- Manuel la Peña (1808–1811), or Lapeña, Spanish military officer who served during the Peninsular War
- Marcos Peña (born 1977), Argentine politician
- Miguel Peña (1781–1833), Venezuelan politician
- Nancy Peña (comics writer) (born 1979), French bande dessinée author and children's literature illustrator
- Nicolás Rodríguez Peña (1775–1853), Argentine businessman and politician, a key figure during the May Revolution
- Pachu Peña (born 1962), Argentine comedian
- Pedro Pablo Peña Cañete (1864–1943), President of Paraguay (1912)
- Ramón María del Valle-Inclán y de la Peña, Marquess de Bradomin, (1866–1936), Spanish dramatist, novelist and member of the Spanish Generation of 98
- Roque Sáenz Peña (1851–1914), President of Argentina (1910–1914)
- Santiago Peña (born 1978), President of Paraguay (2023–present)
- Sergio Peña (disambiguation), several people
- Tony Peña (disambiguation), several people
- Tony Peña (born 1957), Dominican baseball player
- William Merriweather Peña (1919–2018), American architect

== Holders of Spanish titles of nobility and lordships in the 21st century ==
People with the surname Peña holding a title of nobility in Spain at present include:

- Don Ramiro Pérez-Maura y de la Peña, Grandee of Spain, Duke de Maura and Count de Mortera (Granted in 1930 and 1876 respectively)
- Don Antonio González de Aguilar y de la Peña, Marquess de Arenal (Granted in 1847)
- Don Magín Peña y Lorca, Marquess de Ogijares (Granted in 1889)
- Doña Marina Peña y Paradela, Countess de Gaviria (Granted in 1837)
- Doña Helena de la Peña y Robles, Countess de Xauen (Granted in 1929)
- Doña Matilde Francisca Barriouevo y Peña, Vincountess de Barrionuevo (Granted in 1891)
- Don William de la Peña Yappen, Marques of Villar del Águila (Granted in 1689)

== Other ==
- Adarand Constructors v. Peña – United States Supreme Court case
