= Sérgio Pena (geneticist) =

Brazilian geneticist

Sérgio Danilo Junho Pena
- Born: 17 October 1947 (age 78); Belo Horizonte, Brazil
- Education: Faculdade de Medicina da Universidade Federal de Minas Gerais; University of Manitoba
- Spouse: Betânia Pena
- Children: One son, four grandchildren
- Awards: National Order of Scientific Merit (2006)
- Scientific career
- Fields: Human genetics Medical genetics
- Institutions: Federal University of Minas Gerais
- Thesis: Double labeling: a new investigative technique in biochemical genetics (1977)
- Academic advisors: Klaus Wrogemann

Sérgio Danilo Junho Pena (born 17 October 1947) is a Brazilian human geneticist and professor in the Department of Biochemistry and Immunology at the Federal University of Minas Gerais in Belo Horizonte, Brazil. He began researching the population genetics of the Brazilian population in the late 1980s. His research on this subject has highlighted the ways that physical characteristics of Brazilians are often discordant with their genetic ancestry. On the basis of his research showing extensive genetic diversity in the Brazilian population, he has vocally advocated for the view that race is a social construct rather than a biological reality. For instance, he received significant media coverage when he led a research team which analyzed the genetic profiles of nine prominent black Brazilian celebrities in May 2007 for a project organized by BBC Brasil. The results showed that one of these celebrities, Neguinho da Beija-Flor, had predominantly (67%) European ancestry despite identifying as black. He was described as "one of Brazil’s best-known and most media-savvy geneticists" in a 2015 academic journal article.

== Biography ==
Born in Belo Horizonte, Pena graduated from the Faculdade de Medicina da Universidade Federal de Minas Gerais in 1970. He became a fellow of the Royal College of Physicians of Canada in 1975 and received his Ph.D. from the University of Manitoba in 1977. He is a member of the Brazilian Academy of Sciences. Pena received the Great-Cross of the National Order of Scientific Merit in 2006. He received the Prize in Medical Sciences from the World Academy of Sciences (TWAS) in 2007 and was elected to the World Academy of Sciences in 2008. He is a past president of the Brazilian Society of Biochemistry and Molecular Biology and a member of the Human Genome Organisation's council.
