= Federal University of Minas Gerais =

Public university in Belo Horizonte, Brazil

Coordinates: 19.871904°S 43.966248°W

- Universidade Federal de Minas Gerais
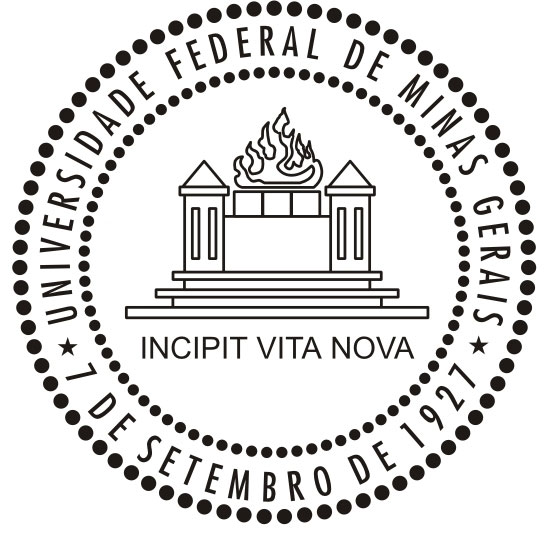
- Other name: UFMG
- Motto: Incipit Vita Nova (Latin)
- Motto in English: A new life begins
- Type: Public university
- Established: 7 September 1927; 99 years ago
- Endowment: R$2,510,329,556 (2025)
- Rector: Sandra Regina Goulart de Almeida
- Administrative staff: 4,445
- Undergraduates: 30,957 (in 2010)
- Postgraduates: 14,838 (in 2010)
- Location: Belo Horizonte, Minas Gerais, Brazil
- Campus: Urban, 8,794,767 square meters (2,173.234 acres)
- Website: www.ufmg.br
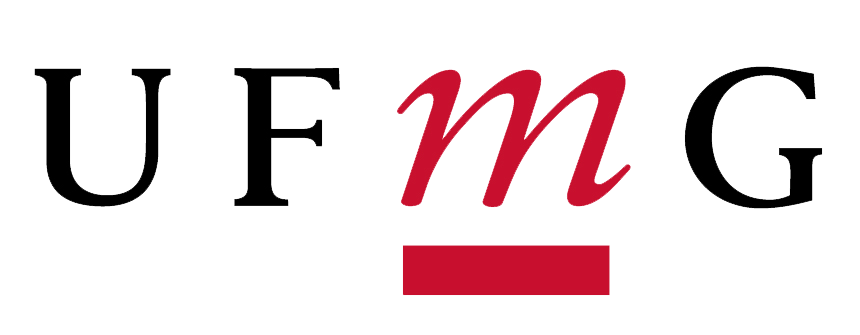

The Federal University of Minas Gerais (Portuguese: Universidade Federal de Minas Gerais, UFMG) is a federal research university located in the state of Minas Gerais, Brazil. Its main and biggest campus is located in the city of Belo Horizonte. It is one of Brazil's five largest and highest-ranked universities.

UFMG offers 79 undergraduate education programs—including bachelor's degrees, licenciate degrees, or professional degree titles (Note: The latter usually applies to regulated health professions, e.g. medic, physiotherapist, psychologist.)—as well as 90 postgraduate education programs, awarding 30 postbaccalaureate specialization degrees, 92 master's degrees, and 72 doctoral degrees; the school's hospital facilities also have 41 medical residency programs. UFMG also has campi at Tiradentes and Montes Claros, though most courses are taught at the main campus in the Pampulha district of Belo Horizonte.

UFMG receives one of the highest amounts of federal funds and resources among all federal universities in Brazil. According to the 2021 Times Higher Education ranking, it is the third best university in Brazil and the fifth best in Latin America. Based on results of the "Student's National Performance Exam" (ENADE), UFMG's undergraduate degrees are among the best in Brazil, while national ranking systems usually place UFMG as one of the best in the country.

== History ==
The origins of the university go back to the 19th century, when it first appeared in the Republic as a continuation of a process that began during the Empire, with the opening of the first institutions of higher education.

In 1898, the Ouro Preto Faculty of Law was transferred to Belo Horizonte, which at the time was set to be the new state capital.

A few new unconnected faculties would be founded later: in 1907, the Free School of Dentistry; in 1911, the Faculty of Medicine, the School of Engineering, and a course in pharmacy attached to the Free School of Dentistry.

In 1927, these four schools merged to found University of Minas Gerais (UMG), a private institution subsidized by the state government. This is the mark of the foundation of the university.

The UMG remained funded by Minas Gerais government until 1949, when funding had been delegated to the Brazilian Government, though, the name UFMG (including Federal) was not adopted until 1965.

In the 1940s, a large area in the Pampulha region became the site for the construction of University City. The first structures erected were the Institute of Mechanics (now the Vocational School) and the Main Building. The effective occupation of the campus by the university community started only in the 1960s, when the construction of the buildings that today house most of the academic units was started.

University rankings

Global – Overall
- QS World: =595 (2026)

At the time of federalization, the schools of architecture, philosophy and economics were already integrated in the university. As its expansion carried on, the school of nursing (1950), veterinary science (1961), information science (1962), music (1962) and physical education (1969) were founded.

In 1968, a university reform altered profoundly the structure of UFMG. The College of Philosophy spawned multiple institutions: the College of Philosophy and Human Sciences, the Institute of Biological Sciences, the Institute of Exact Sciences, the Institute of Geosciences and the Colleges of Literature and Education.

Additional courses have been established, among them agronomy, archival science, theater, museology, control engineering, computational mathematics, and speech therapy/audiology.

In 2025 UFMG has 32 areas of knowledge including the global ranking QS 2025.

== Population ==
The UFMG has a population of roughly 72 thousand people among 34,482 undergraduate students, 2,247 postbaccalaureate specialization students, 10,556 master's and doctoral students, 3,202 professors, and 4,246 administrative employees. It is research-oriented, even at the undergraduate level, whose students are encouraged to take part in research development through the Scientific Initiation program. Out of the number of professors, 761 (24%) are CNPq award-recipients due to outstanding research productivity. It encompasses 860 research groups, 1051 patent deposits in Brazil and abroad, and has the highest score (5 out of 5) at the Ministry of Education's undergraduate assessment.

== Admissions ==
The undergraduate students are admitted through the national annual exams called Exame Nacional do Ensino Médio (National High School Exam). Competition to get into undergraduate programs involved 111,718 candidates to 6740 vacancy openings (16.6 candidates per vacancy; 6% of candidates get a position).

== Location ==
The UFMG main campus is located at the Pampulha region of the city of Belo Horizonte. The total area of this land-campus equals 8,769,690 square meters, with a built area reaching 639,777 square meters. Aside from the main campus in Pampulha, in the same city there are the UFMG Health Sciences campus at Alfredo Balena Avenue in the city's hospitals district (or Santa Efigênia district), the UFMG School of Architecture and Design campus located at the Savassi district, and the Faculty of Law and State Sciences campus at the city center (in Belo Horizonte there are also ecological parks and cultural facilities such as a Conservatoire and 20 museums that belong to, and are administered by, the university).

Outside of Belo Horizonte, UFMG has the Agronomic Sciences Campus in the city of Montes Claros, and a cultural campus in the city of Tiradentes (both in the state of Minas Gerais). The UFMG has also several other facilities such as Casa da Glória in Diamantina. Within the Pampulha Campus there is the CDTN, a Federal Institute for Nuclear Sciences Research. The campus avails of 38 built facilities, hundreds of scientific research laboratories and a 250 kW TRIGA nuclear reactor from General Atomics. There is also an extensive area of secondary forest known as the Estação Ecológica ("Ecological Station"), where some university scientists – mainly ecologists and zoologists – carry out research; this is the largest green space within the city boundaries, and is home to endemic insect species.

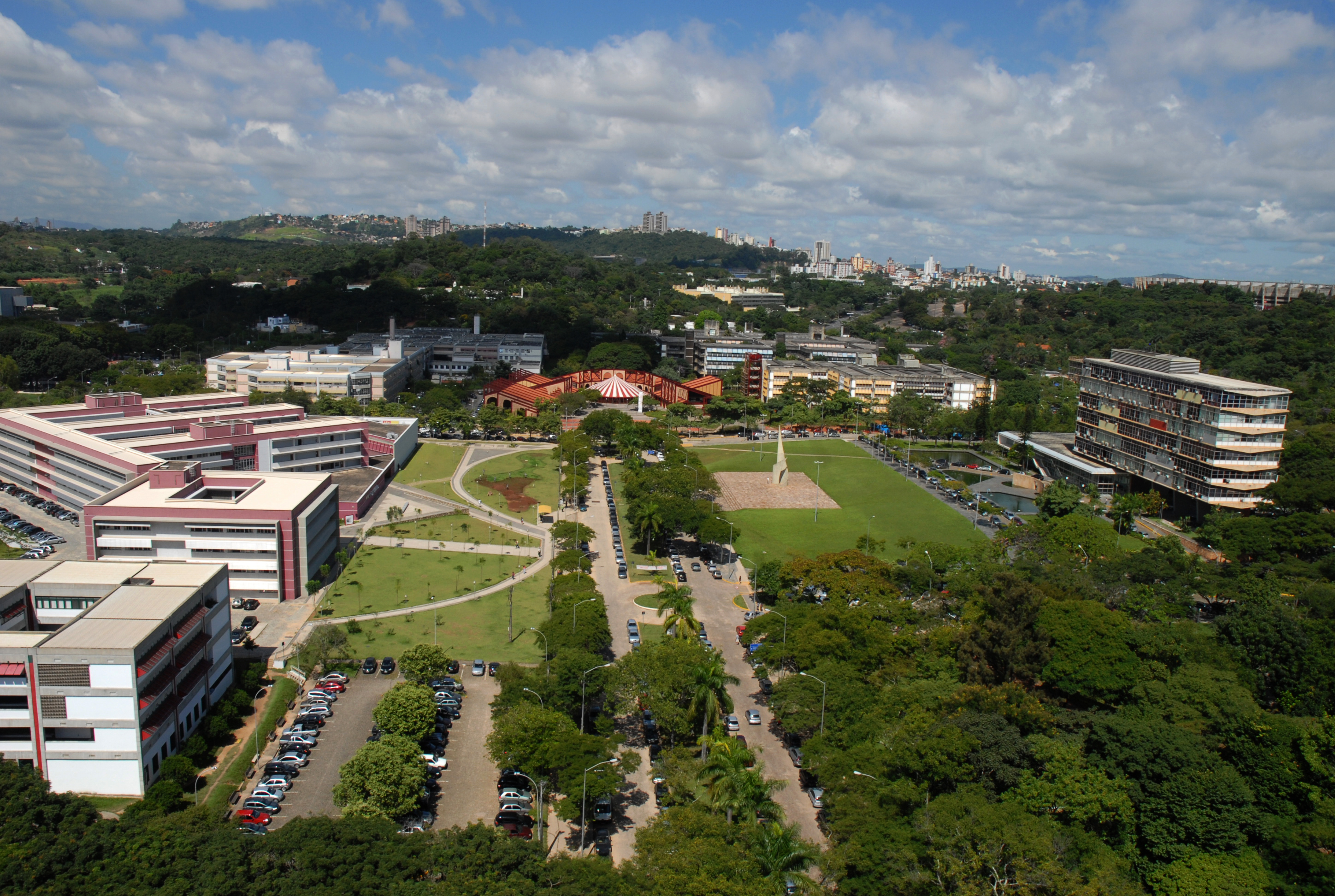
Panoramic photography, by Foca Lisboa

== Academic Units ==
The faculty members (professors and lecturers) of the Federal University of Minas Gerais are hosted by departments. The departments are administered by one of three types of collegiate units: Schools, Faculties, and Institutes. Administratively, Schools, Faculties, and Institutes enjoy an equivalent executive status as Academic Units under the university, so they provide no practical difference among each other in administrative terms. They are the main Colleges of the university.

=== Schools ===
==== School of Architecture (EA) ====
The UFMG School of Architecture is in the central region of Belo Horizonte, more precisely at the intersection of Gonçalves Dias and Paraíba streets in the Savassi region. Founded in 1939, UFMG School of Architecture was the first course of architecture in Brazil released from engineering or fine arts. The building was designed by architect Shakespeare Gomes, one of the most representative works of modernism in Belo Horizonte. Currently, the school has the architecture courses (Day), Architecture (Night) and Design (Night).

==== School of Fine Arts (EBA) ====
The School of Fine Arts (Beaux-Arts or Belas Artes) of the Federal University of Minas Gerais is an institution located within the Pampulha campus of the university. It hosts undergraduate courses in visual and performing arts, including animation and digital arts, as well as post-graduate courses in Art.

==== School of Information Science (ECI) ====
The School of Information Science (ECI) is an institution of the UFMG. Its foundation date of 25 March 1950 and its incorporation into the Federal University of Minas Gerais took place in 1963. The ECI is dedicated to the training of people dealing with information science. The School currently offers undergraduate courses in Library, Archival and Museology. The building has one of the most peculiar architectures between units of UFMG. The various palm trees in the central part, the hanging gardens over the four floors, balconies and floor details create an interesting aesthetic effect.

==== School of Music ====
Formerly located at the Conservatory building (now Conservatório UFMG) in the center of the city, it migrated to Pampulha in the early 1990s. It teaches musical performance (classical and popular), composition, conducting, music education and music therapy. It comprises the departments of Instruments & Voice (INC Instrumentos e Canto) and Music Theory (TGM Teoria Geral da Música). The school has a library, two recording studios, two sonology laboratories ans an annexe for teaching music to young children.

==== School of Physical Education, Physiotherapy and Occupational Therapy (EEFFTO) ====
The School of Physical Education, Physiotherapy and Occupational Therapy, Universidade Federal de Minas Gerais is an institution located within the Pampulha campus of the university. It is taught the course of physical education, physical therapy and occupational therapy.

==== Nursing School ====
The UFMG School of Nursing was established on 7 July 1933. It currently holds a prominent position on the national scene for its undergraduate courses and Graduate Studies, and its research and extension projects. Currently, the School of Nursing is organized by the Departments of Applied Nursing (ENA), Basic Nursing (ENB) and Maternal Child Nursing and Public Health (EMI). Undergraduate courses in Nursing, Nutrition Course and System Analysis Course and health services are offered.

==== School of Professional and Basic Education ====
This unit is special in the scope of the university in the sense it is not concerned with higher education, undergraduate or graduate courses. It is the unit responsible for the teaching of basic education, i.e. education prior to higher education. The UFMG has a kindergarten school, a primary elementary school, a middle school, and several high school courses, either academic or professional. Usually, the teachers of these levels of education at these UFMG schools are students of the UFMG Faculty of Education pursuing their practices, but these facilities also have permanent faculty members who are actually administered by the same regulations as any other lecturer of professor. This academic unit, the School of Professional and Basic Education, is responsible for the administration of these teaching activities and the permanent members are hired by this school.

==== School of Engineering ====
The School of Engineering hosts 13 faculty departments (Structures, Materials and Construction, Mining, Industrial Production, Transportation and Geotechnical, Electrical, Electronic, Hydric Resources and Hydraulic, Mechanical, Metallurgical, Nuclear, Chemical, and Sanitary and Environmental Engineering departments), 11 undergraduate engineer degree-awarding courses, and 10 post-graduate master's and doctorate title-awarding programs, held in a 13 pavilions (among classroom buildings, research buildings, libraries, and one-lab buildings for nuclear and fuel-combustion research) facilities complex.

==== School of Veterinary Medicine (FMV) ====
The UFMG Veterinary Medicine School is one of the best in Brasil, encompassing two undergraduate courses (Acquaculture and Veterinary Medicine and Surgery), several departments, several post-graduate programs, and many research labs. Its facilities encompass several pavilions of buildings and a many-wings Veterinary Medicine Hospital that receives all types of animals for treatments from zoos and institutions of many different parts of Brazil.

=== Faculties ===
==== Faculty of Philosophy and Human Sciences (FAFICH) ====
The Faculty of Philosophy and Human Sciences (FAFICH) has seven departments, namely: Psychology, Philosophy, Anthropology, Sociology, Political Science, History, and Media and Communication. Out of its nearly 250 faculty members, 95% have doctoral degrees and are doing research. Among several laboratories on Social and Behavioural research fields, FAFICH has 6 laboratories of high research output focusing specifically on cognitive psychology, neuropsychology, and behaviour analysis. This academic unit is one of the founding, core units of the collegiate-like University of Minas Gerais, and has a privileged spot at the UFMG as having graduated notable people.

The undergraduate titles awarded by FAFICH can be of three types: bachelor's degrees (research-based), licenciate degrees (teaching-based), or, in the particular case of Psychology, as a Health Science whose title allows for a license to practice the profession of psychologist, the legislation that regulates this title, under the National Health Sciences Committee (in Portuguese, Conselho Nacional de Saúde, or CNS), requires the degree to be called the profession, so for the graduates of the 5-year theoretico-practical undergraduate course of psychology, the degree awarded by FAFICH and the university is a title of Psychologist, styled after the regulations of the CNS, like other Health licensed professions.

The Department of Psychology of the faculty is the largest and has the strongest research output, along with the Department of Political Science. The Department of Anthropology is one of the first in Brazil and hosts an undergraduate course of its own and a post-graduate program of its own, producing research in the avant-garde of the field in the world.

==== Faculty of Law and State Sciences (FDCE) ====
The Faculty of Law and State Sciences is located on a campus of its own at the center of Belo Horizonte downtown, a two-tower, 16-floor facility of prize-winning architecture, at the corner of Guajajaras street with Álvares Cabral Avenue. Its faculty is hosted by 4 departments: Public Law, Labour Law and Law Theory, Law and Criminal Procedure, and Civil and Commercial Law and Procedure. It awards two undergraduate titles: bachelor's degree in law, and bachelor's degree in state sciences. It also hosts a postgraduate program in law, awarding the titles of master's and doctorate in law.

==== Faculty of Medicine (FM) ====
The faculty members are clustered into 12 departments: Pathological Anatomy and Legal Medicine, Anatomy and Medical Imaging, Human Musculoskeletal System, Clinical Medicine, Surgery, Speech and Language Pathology and Therapy, Gynaecology and Obstetrics, Social Medicine and Preventive Healthcare, Ophthalmology and Otorhinolaryngology, Pediatrics, Complementary Propaedeutics, and Mental Health.

The Faculty of Medicine hosts three undergraduate courses: Medicine, Speech and Language Pathology-Therapy, and Radiodiagnostic Technology. This Faculty also hosts 10 graduate programs issuing master's and doctorate titles, namely: Speech and Language Pathology-Therapy, Surgery and Ophthalmology, Infectology and Tropical Medicine, Molecular Medicine, Pathology, Preventive Medicine (this one only issues master's degrees, and not yet doctorate titles), Child and Adolescent Health, Public Health, and Women's Health. This faculty also is responsible for the UFMG Clinics Hospital and all medical residency programs that take place there.

==== Faculty of Economics (FACE) ====
The UFMG Faculty of Economics hosts 5 undergraduate courses: Business Administration, Accounting, Economics, Finances and Management Control System, and International Economic Relations. The Faculty also houses several post-graduate programs and faculty member departments.

==== Faculty of Education (FaE) ====
The Faculty of Education of the UFMG hosts several departments, post-graduate programs, and undergraduate courses, with focus on Pedagogy and Educational Sciences and Practices. Its Education Post-Graduate Program is one of the best in Brazil.

==== Faculty of Pharmacy (FAFA) ====
The UFMG Faculty of Pharmacy is one of the best in Brazil, offering two undergraduate courses (Pharmacy and Biomedicine) and several Post-Graduate programs. Its faculty members are divided into 4 departments: Food Production, Drug Production, Social Pharmacy, and Toxicological Analyses.

==== Faculty of Letters (FALE) ====
The UFMG Faculty of Letters hosts the undergraduate course in Letters, which is divided into several emphases, such as Linguistics, Portuguese, Ensligh, French, German, Spanish, Italian, Ancient Greek, Latin, Editorial Services, Literature etc. It has two Graduate programs awarding master's and doctorate titles: Linguistics and Literature. It has a strong Linguistics research output, making it one of the best graduate programs in Brazil (Maximum score by the Brazilian Higher Education Research Administration).

==== Faculty of Dentistry (FO) ====
The UFMG Faculty of Dentistry is the odontological unit, graduating dentist-surgeons and performing research and practice activities on Odontology.

=== Institutes ===
==== Exact Sciences Institute (ICEx) ====
The Exact Sciences Institute of the Federal University of Minas Gerais offers nine undergraduate courses awarding either bachelor's or licenciate titles: Actuarial Science, Computer Science, Statistics, Physics, Mathematics, Computational Mathematics, Chemistry, Technological Chemistry, and Information Systems. Professor Ado Jorio is a faculty member of the ICEx Department of Physics, and has the most outstanding research output among all UFMG faculty members.

==== Biological Sciences Institute (ICB) ====
The Biological Sciences Institute of the UFMG hosts the undergraduate course in Biological Sciences, 12 Post-Graduate master's and doctoral degrees awarding programs, and 10 faculty departments.

==== Institute of Agronomy (ICA) ====
This institute offers 6 undergraduate courses: Administration, Agronomy, Environmental and Agricultural Engineering, Food Engineering, Forest Engineering, and Zootechny

==== Institute of Geosciences (IGC) ====
This unit hosts three undergraduate courses: Geography, Geology, and Tourism.

== Research ==
UFMG has been ranked among the best universities in Brazil and in Latin America.

The Office of the Dean of Research advises the university administration on scientific and technological research, as well as encouraging research. The Center for Technology Innovation and Transfer promotes activities that apply technology development and transfer knowledge between UFMG and the community, via the creation of partnerships between researchers and business.

=== Information Science ===
The School of Information Science (former School of Librarian Science) has a full-time academic staff that explores research topics in the areas of Scientific and Technological, Managerial, and Social and Historical Information. In addition, using the Lab of Information Treatment, the unit works on topics related to information storage and diffusion.

=== Law ===
The Law School of UFMG has four main departments, which are devoted to the following areas: General Theory of Law (Jurisprudence), Legal History, Private Law and Civil Procedural Law, Criminal Law and Criminal Procedural Law, International Law, Conflict of Laws, Public Law, Constitutional Law, Administrative Law, Economic Law, Tax Law, Labour Law amongst others. On 20 December 2012, the School of Law will celebrate its 120th anniversary, being one of the oldest Law Schools in Brazil after University of São Paulo (USP) and Universities of Pernambuco and Rio de Janeiro.

Between 1892 – year of its foundation – and 1927 the Law School was an autonomous institution and congregated several important lawyers and politicians in national context. In the year of 1927, the Free Law Faculty of Minas Gerais (Faculdade Livre de Direito de Minas Gerais) joined the administrative framework of the Federal University of Minas Gerais. Since then, it is one of UFMG's main Schools and Research Centres.

=== Architecture ===
One of the research centers at the School of Architecture, which is divided into four departments, is the Graphic Laboratory for the Teaching of Architecture (Lagear), equipped with computer-assisted design programs. Among the research topics are Computer-Assisted Photogrametry, Computer-Assisted Photo-Documentation, Photorealistic Representations, as well as studies on accessibility (Architecture without barriers for disabled people).

=== Economics ===
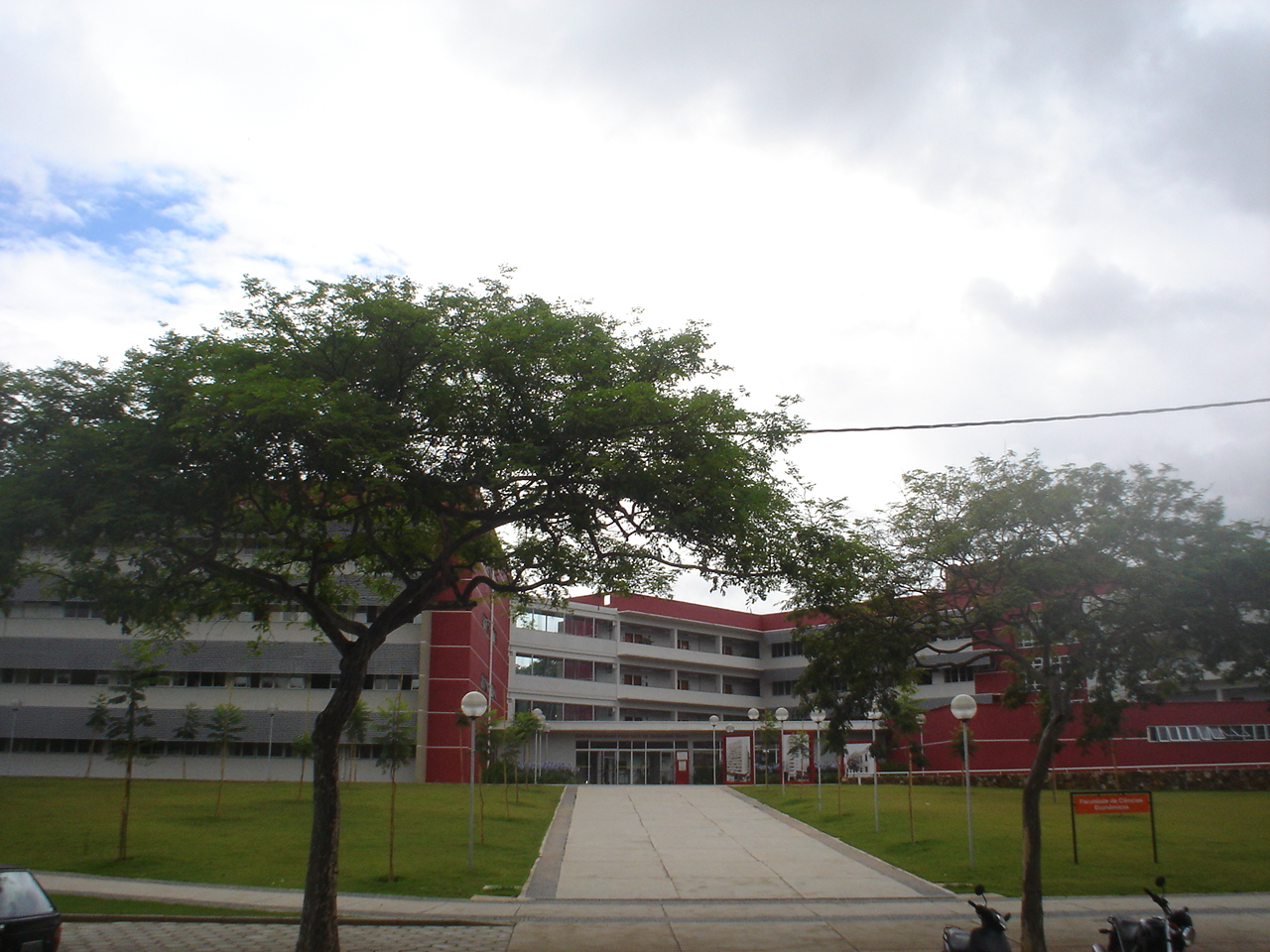
Faculty of Economic Sciences

Most research topics explored at the School of Economics (Face) are related to work done at the Center for Regional Development and Planning (Cedeplar), at the Center for Research and Graduate Studies in Business Administration (Cepead), and at the Research Institute in Economics, Business Administration, and Accounting (Ipead).

At Cedeplar, where 25 teachers have a doctoral degree and 10 have a master's degree, there is research on Demographics and on Economics, with projects on Fecundity, Historical Demographics and Labor, Agricultural and Industrial Economics, Economic History, Economics and Environment, and Privatizations. At Cepead, 11 teachers have a doctoral degree and eight have a master's. They study Sectors of Support for Decision Making, Human Behavior in Organizations, Performance and Financial Strategy in Organizations. With four teachers holding a doctoral degree and two holding a master's, the Ipead provides consultancy and calculates monthly rates of indices, such as price and rent variation.

=== Biological sciences ===
Six graduate programs and around 300 topics of research occupy 290 teachers at the Institute of Biological Sciences (ICB), 90% of whom holding doctoral, master's or post-baccalaureate degrees.

The laboratories of the institute's ten departments conduct research in Biology, some of them being national standards, such as the Center of Electronic Microscopy. ICB has developed a simple non-radioactive methodology for the study of DNA impressions and the American visceral leishmaniasis vaccine. Among the ICB topics of research responsible for the largest number of publications are those related to the development of new vaccines and medications – Biochemistry, Immunology, and Microbiology – to Genetics and to Ecology. The unit makes contributions to Botany, Zoology, Morphology, and Parasitology.

To assist researchers and teachers, ICB has four laboratory animal facilities with hundreds of guinea pigs kept in accordance to international principles of animal experimentation.

The university operates the 114 hectares (280 acres) Federal University of Minas Gerais Ecological Station on the Pampulha campus, used for various research projects including a master's course in Ecology Conservation and Wildlife Management.

=== Veterinary medicine ===
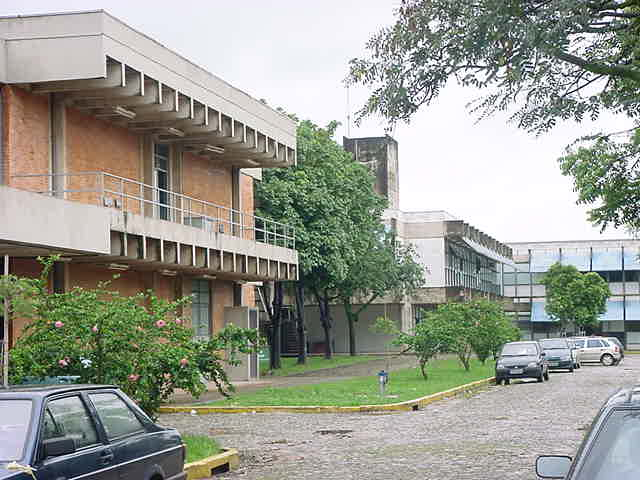
College of Veterinary Medicine

Founded in 1932, the College of Veterinary Medicine (CVM) (Veterinary College of UFMG) completed 80 years in 2012, and has trained over 5,000 veterinarians. CVM conducts animal science and veterinary medicine education and research. In addition to Veterinary Medicine, CVM offers an undergraduate degree in Aquaculture. MSc and PhD degrees in Animal Science and Animal Husbandry, Veterinary Medical Residency, and Professional MSc are available in 19 areas of knowledge. The college is located in the Pampulha Campus and has four departments: Veterinary Clinic and Surgery (DCCV), Preventive Veterinary Medicine (DMVP), Technology and Inspection of Animal Products (DTIPOA) and Animal Science (DZOO). Two experimental farms and the Veterinary Hospital are available.

The five-year Veterinary Medicine course takes 120 students per year and over 95% of undergraduate students complete the course. Most faculty at teaching are full-time, permanent and have PhD degrees (more than 90%). About 1/3 of undergraduate students participate in research activities in 112 laboratories and produce around 250 academic research abstracts per year. More than 140 scientific papers are produced per year by faculty members.

=== Engineering ===
Around 70% of the 280 teachers at the School of Engineering work on 60 topics of research.

Most research work done in Engineering is related to technological development, with application in industry, funded by national and international agencies. By means of agreements and service contracts signed through the Christiano Otonni Foundation, the school makes contact with companies from the public and private sectors.

In Sanitary and Environmental Engineering, an Environmental Monitoring and Water Treatment Project has been run in collaboration with the German agency TGZ.

Three topics of research are pursued in Electric Engineering, monitored by the department's Research Center: high tension, which includes studies on protection against atmospheric discharges, power electronics, and control of industrial processes.

In the Department of Civil Engineering, research is carried out at the Laboratory of Structural Analysis, where structures submitted to very high pressure are evaluated. Work is being done on energy alternatives, mainly on photovoltaic energy (the transformation of sun light into energy) and solar collectors. The projects are supported by the Minas Gerais Energy Company (Cemig) and Eletrobrás.

At the Department of Chemical Engineering, there is research on liquid/liquid separation and on heat sensitive substances. At the Department of Mining Engineering, two of the most important research topics are mineral treatment and prospecting. The School of Engineering's largest department is Metallurgic Engineering, which has an X-ray lab and an electronic microscopy lab, among others. Research involves extractive metallurgy, physical metallurgy, which deals with material molding, and "Trefilação".

Still at the School of Engineering, there is the Center for Electronic Computation, linked to the Scientific Computation Lab.

=== Social sciences and philosophy ===
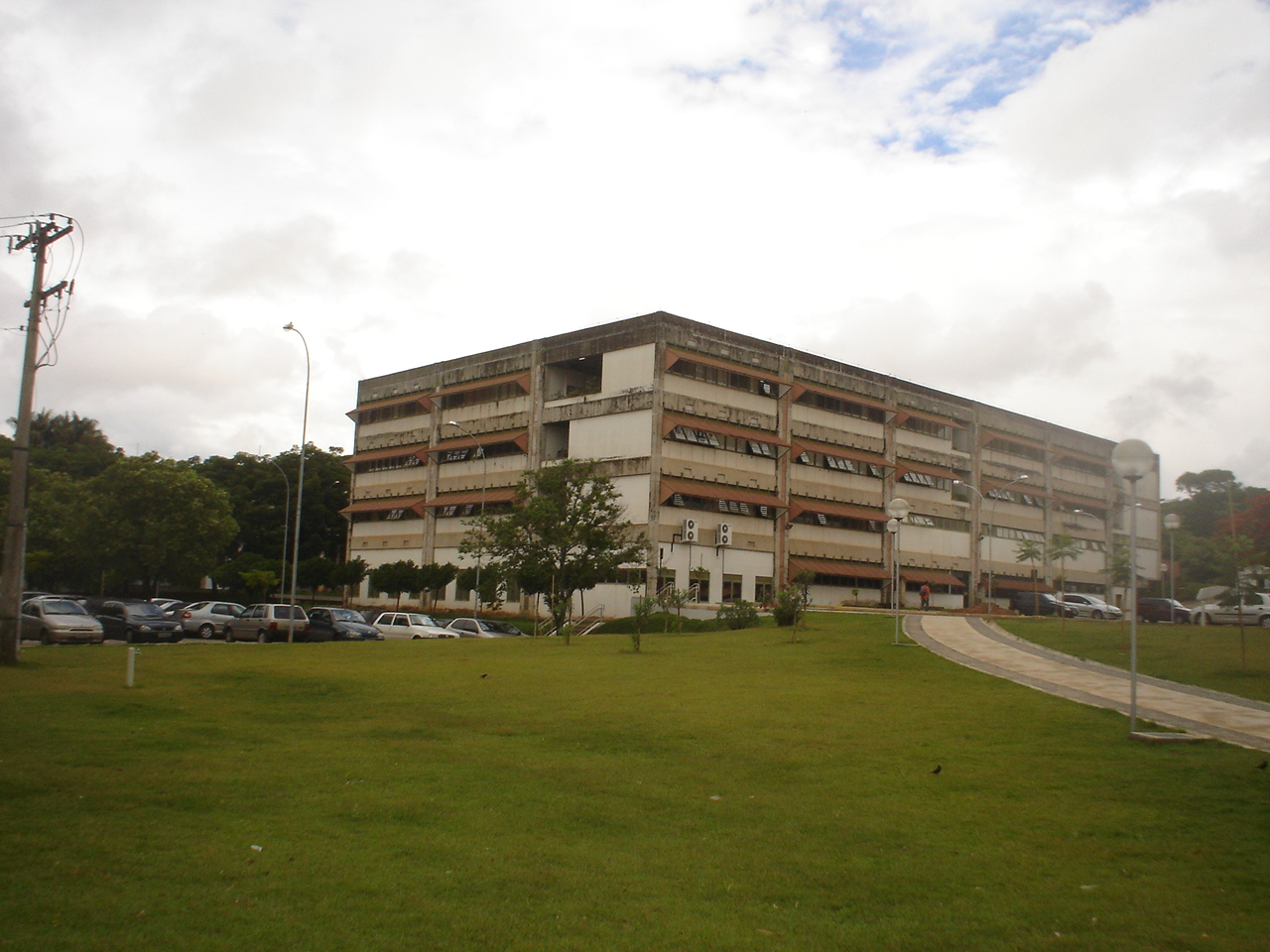
Faculty of Philosophy and Human Sciences (FAFICH)

Six academic units conduct research in human sciences and applied social sciences. At the Faculty of Philosophy and Human Sciences (FAFICH), 95% of its near 250 lecturers from its seven departments have doctoral degrees and are doing research. At the Department of Sociology, researches focus mainly on urban and industrial sociology, quantitative/systems sociology, and sociology of culture. At the Department of History, the characteristic topics are oral, political, and economic history. The Department of Political Sciences works mostly with public and administrative policies, Brazilian and international politics, electoral behavior, and political theory. At the Department of Philosophy, most works focus on the relationship between philosophy and psychoanalysis, Marxism, social and political philosophy, esthetics, art philosophy, epistemology and philosophy of science, and logic. The Department of Philosophy's the Esthetics Laboratory does research and documentation work on Esthetics and Art and Civilization History.

=== Psychology ===
The Department of Psychology is the largest of the Faculty of Philosophy and Human Sciences, and holds the position of one of the best in Brazil due to undergraduate teaching outputs. The UFMG Department of Psychology administers two post-graduate programs awarding titles of master's and doctoral degrees: one is the Psychology Graduate Program, and the other one is the Cognition and Behavior Graduate Program.

=== Education ===
The Faculty of Education (FAE) has three departments, which carry out interdisciplinary activities with other university sectors. The Center for Literacy, Reading, and Writing (Ceale), which develops projects on child and adult literacy, has been the major source of publication at FAE. The Center for Mathematics and Science Teaching in Minas Gerais (Cecimig) studies the learning processes in the area and offers permanent courses for primary and secondary teachers.

=== Medical sciences ===
The UFMG Faculty of Medicine is one of the founding academic units and receives massive investments from the Union's (Federal Government) Executive Power Ministry of Health, leading to an important research output in the Brazilian scientific scenario. The UFMG School of Medicine's twelve departments research more than 100 topics, using the infrastructure of the Hospital das Clínicas and its 14 labs. Around 60% of the unit's more than 470 teachers hold a master's or a doctoral degree, and most of them take part in scientific production.

A large part of the research stems from the 12 medicine post graduate programs offered by UFMG. Among the topics are infectious and parasitic diseases, hematology and oncology, gastroenterology and digestive tract surgery, ophthalmology, and endocrinology. There are also publications on pathology, surgery, ambulatory surgery, infectious and parasitic diseases, spider and snake poisons, transplants, toxicology, tropical medicine, sexually transmitted diseases, AIDS, fetal medicine, neurosurgery, oncology, gynecology and obstetrics, and preventive and social medicine.

=== Nursing ===
More than half the 82 teachers of the School of Nursing, most of whom have master's and doctoral degrees, are involved in projects that are largely interdisciplinary.

Distributed among the unit's three departments, they work at the university hospitals and in the public health system. Some of their research topics are education and the nursing curriculum, transmitted diseases, work force, workers' health quality, and rites of death in senior citizens' memories.

=== Dentistry ===
Many of the School of Dentistry's 100 teachers, one-fifth of whom hold a master's or doctoral degree, does research. Research includes bio-safety in dental practice, dental trauma, social representation of health and mouth disease, orthodontics for deciduous and permanent teeth, surgery, periodontal disease and cyst, and prevention and epidemiology of cavities and other diseases.

=== Pharmacy ===
The Faculty of Pharmacy, which has four departments, does mostly experimental research. Of the unit's more than 70 teachers, about 35% hold a doctoral degree and approximately the same percentage have a master's degree. Research includes the development of new substances and medicines at the school's laboratories, mainly the Labs of Medicines and of Pharmacognosis and Plant Chemistry.

The Department of Food does research on biotechnology (quality control and food science and technology). The Department of Clinical Analyses has work on parasitology and applied toxicology, as well as on clinical bio-chemistry.

=== Physical education ===
The School of Physical Education investigates about 20 research topics. At the two departments linked to the Physical Education program, nearly half the 35 teachers do research, most of which is done in the Labs of Exercise Physiology and of Sport Psychology. Research includes studies of the behavior of the human organism, athlete conditioning, prevention of temperature accidents during exercises, effects of caffeine on the body, and neuroendocrinologic response to exercise. In the Department of Physiotherapy and Occupational Therapy, there are projects related to neuropediatrics and to physiotherapy in geriatrics. The department's researchers work at the Hospital das Clínicas and at the Lab of Therapeutic Gymnastics, which belongs to the school.

== Faculties ==
- Colégio Técnico – Coltec
- Centro Esportivo Universitário – CEU
- Escola de Arquitetura
- Escola de Belas-Artes – EBA
- Escola de Ciência da Informação (Escola de Biblioteconomia)
- Escola de Educação Física, Fisioterapia e Terapia Ocupacional – EEFFTO
- Escola de Enfermagem
- Escola de Engenharia
- Escola de Música
- Escola de Veterinária
- Faculdade de Ciências Econômicas – FACE
- Faculdade de Direito
- Faculdade de Educação – FAE
- Faculdade de Farmácia
- Faculdade de Filosofia e Ciências Humanas – FAFICH
- Faculdade de Letras – FALE
- Faculdade de Medicina
- Faculdade de Odontologia
- Instituto de Ciências Agrárias da Universidade Federal de Minas Gerais – ICA
- Instituto de Ciências Biológicas – ICB
- Instituto de Ciências Exatas – ICEx
- Instituto de Geociências – IGC
- Parque Tecnológico – BHTEC

== Notable alumni ==
- Cyro dos Anjos - writer
- Carlos Drummond de Andrade - poet
- Fernando Brant - musician
- Welington de Melo - electrical engineer and mathematician
- Adana Omágua Kambeba - first indigenous Amazonian woman to become a doctor
- Juscelino Kubitschek - politician
- Fernando Maculan - architect
- Pedro Nava - writer
- Tancredo Neves - politician
- Rondon Pacheco - politician
- Ivo Pitanguy - plastic surgeon
- João Guimarães Rosa - writer, medical doctor, and diplomat
- Samuel Rosa of Skank
- Dilma Rousseff - politician
- Fernando Sabino - writer
- Laura Sabino - politician and YouTuber
- Fernanda Takai of Pato Fu

== See also ==
- Brazil University Rankings
- List of federal universities of Brazil
- Minas Gerais State University
- Universities and Higher Education in Brazil
