= Technical College of the Federal University of Minas Gerais =

Coordinates: 19.871904°S 43.966248°W

- Colégio Técnico da Universidade Federal de Minas Gerais

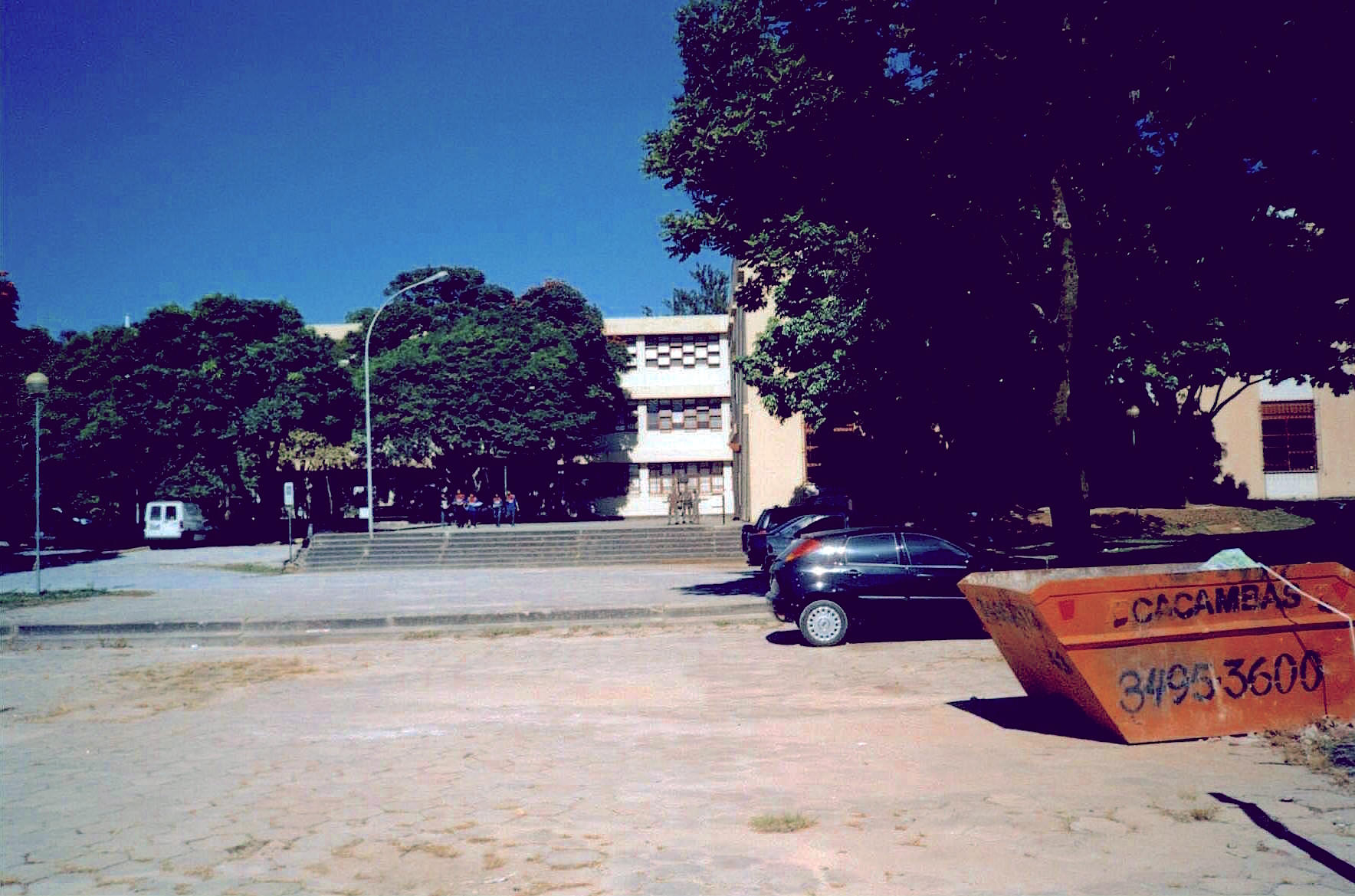
- Facade of the Technical College

Location
- Av. Antônio Carlos, 6627; Belo Horizonte, Minas Gerais; Brazil

Information
- School type: Public secondary and technical school
- Founded: 1969; 57 years ago
- Principal: Professor José Eduardo Borges Moreira
- Language: Portuguese
- Schedule type: Yearly
- Colours: Green, orange, blue
- Affiliation: Federal University of Minas Gerais
- Phone: (31) 3409 4964
- Website: www.coltec.ufmg.br

The Technical College of the Federal University of Minas Gerais (Portuguese: Colégio Técnico da Universidade Federal de Minas Gerais, Coltec) (Note: The official name of the college appears in Annex III of Federal Ordinary Law 11.892/08) is a Brazilian federal public secondary and technical educational institution based in Belo Horizonte, Minas Gerais.

It was established in 1969 as the result of an agreement between the British Council, the Federal University of Minas Gerais (UFMG), the National Council for Scientific and Technological Development (CNPq), and the Ministry of Education (MEC), with the goal of training technicians to meet the demands of the labor market. The book collection at the Coltec library began in 1970 with a donation of more than three hundred books from the British Council.

The school ranks very highly, placing among the top four public educational institutions in Brazil according to the results of the 2013 national high school examination (ENEM): Coltec achieved a score of 660.80, establishing itself as the fourth-best public educational institution in the country.

At the state level, it ranks as the third-best public institution in the state of Minas Gerais, while at the municipal level, it is the best public institution in Belo Horizonte — holding the top spot in the rankings, a position it has achieved in several other years as well.

Backed by one of the country’s most renowned universities, UFMG, Coltec has consistently proven itself to be one of the best educational institutions in Brazil, achieving excellent results in performance assessments. In 2011 and 2008, it ranked among the top public educational institutions in Brazil — placing eighth and eleventh, respectively — according to the National Institute for Educational Studies and Research Anísio Teixeira (INEP).

The school offers five daytime technical courses integrated with high school, and two evening technical courses for those who have already completed high school. The daytime technical programs, offered integrated with secondary education, are chemistry, systems development, industrial automation, electronics, and clinical analysis, each one with 36 vacancies per year. The evening courses, offered to those who have already completed high school, are mobile application development and biotechnology, each one also with 36 vacancies per year.

The entrance selection test is annual and requires Portuguese Language, Natural Sciences, Mathematics, Geography, and General and Brazilian History.

== See also ==
- British Council
- Federal University of Minas Gerais
