= Law School of the Federal University of Minas Gerais =

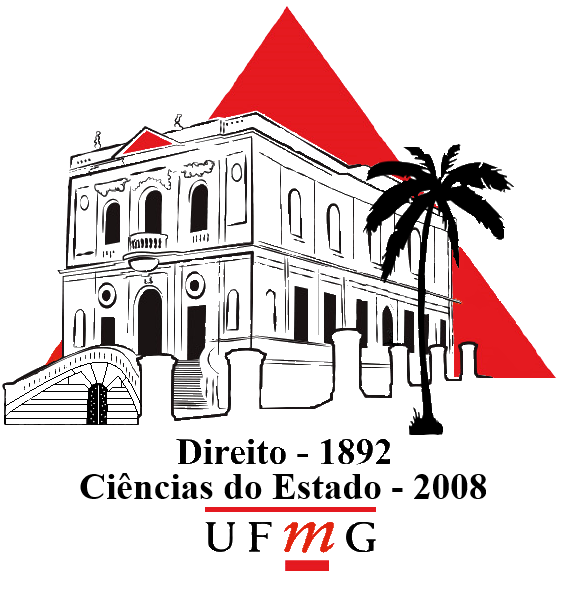
- Former name: Faculdade Livre de Direito
- Type: Law school
- Established: December 10, 1892; 133 years ago
- Founders: Afonso Pena
- Parent institution: Federal University of Minas Gerais
- Director: Hermes Vilchez Guerrero
- Students: 2,536 (2012)
- Location: Belo Horizonte, Minas Gerais, Brazil; 19°55′33″S 43°56′11″W,
- Website: www.direito.ufmg.br

The Law School of the Federal University of Minas Gerais (Portuguese: Faculdade de Direito da Universidade Federal de Minas Gerais) is a subdivision of the Federal University of Minas Gerais. It was founded in 1892 as an independent institution named the Free Faculty of Law of Minas Gerais in Ouro Preto and was later integrated to the university in 1927.

== History ==
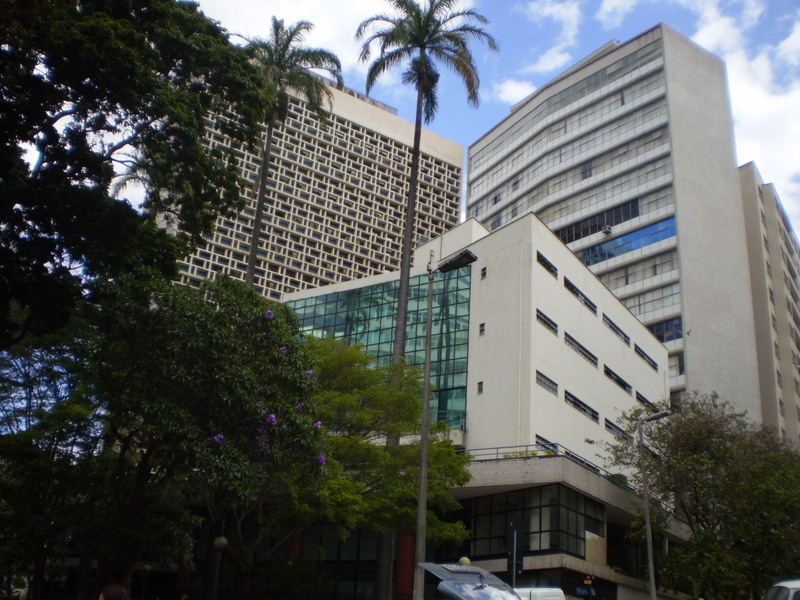
Complex of buildings that houses the Law School of the Federal University of Minas Gerais

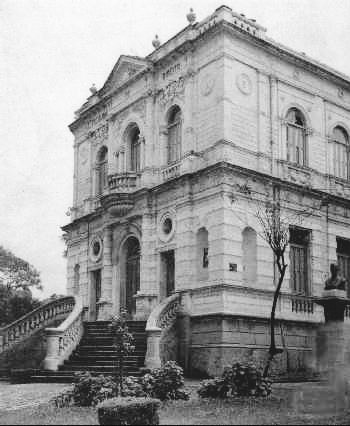
Building demolished in 1958

The Law school was founded in December 10, 1892 by Brazilian lawyer and former president of Brazil Afonso Pena alongside other lawyers and jurists, under the name Free Faculty of Law of Minas Gerais, in Ouro Preto and was later moved to Belo Horizonte in 1898. It was integrated to the University of Minas Gerais (UMG) in 1927 and later, as a result of the federalization of the university in 1949, became a faculty under the Federal University of Minas Gerais.

The School's founder and first director, Brazil's former president Afonso Pena, was succeeded by Antonio Gonçalves Chaves, Francisco Mendes Pimentel, Edmundo Pereira Lins, Arthur Ribeiro de Oliveira, Francisco Brant, Lincoln Prates, Antonio Martins Villas-Boas, Jose Geinaert of Valle Ferreira, Alberto Deodato Maia Barreto, Lourival Vilela Viana, Wilson da Silva Melo, Messiah Pereira Donato, José Alfredo de Oliveira Baracho, Washington Peluso Albino de Souza, Gonzaga Aloizio Araujo de Andrade, Ariosvaldo de Campos Pires, Aloizio Gonzaga de Andrade Araújo, Joaquim Carlos Salgado, Amanda Flavio Oliveira and Fernando Gonzaga Jayme.

In honor of its founder, the UFMG School of Law is still affectionately called the Vetusta Casa de Afonso Pena (Ancient House of Afonso Pena), by its students and academic community.

In 1908 it was founded Centro Acadêmico Afonso Pena or Afonso Pena Academic Center, the CAAP, one of the oldest and most traditional of Minas Gerais and Brazil.

== Facilities ==
In 1958, the old building was demolished, giving place the Villas-Boas building (inaugurated by the Director Antonio Martins Villas-Bôas), the Valle-Ferreira building (inaugurated by the Dean Washington Peluso Albino de Souza in 1990) and the Library building, inaugurated in 1998 by the Dean Aloizio Gonzaga Araujo de Andrade.

Inside the Library building, it was built, in original size and design, the first façade of the Free School of Law.

In December 2007, the Congregation of the School approved its transfer to UFMG's Pampulha Campus, buildings are to be constructed in coming years.

== Organization ==
The school is divided into four departments:

- Civil Procedure and Commercial Law (DIC)
- Law and Criminal Procedure (DIN)
- Public Law (DIP)
- Labor Law and Jurisprudence (DIT)

== Notable alumni ==
Presidents

- Artur Bernardes
- Carlos Luz
- Tancredo Neves

Prosecutor General of the Republic of Brazil

- Décio Meireles de Miranda
- José Paulo Sepúlveda Pertence
- Aristides Junqueira
- Rodrigo Janot Monteiro de Barros
