= Sergio Peña =

Sergio Peña or Sérgio Pena may refer to:

- Sergio Peña (Peruvian footballer) (born 1995), Peruvian football midfielder
- Sergio Peña (Honduran footballer) (born 1987), Honduran football midfielder
- Sergio Peña (racing driver) (born 1993), American NASCAR driver
- Sergio Peña Clos (1927–2018), Puerto Rican politician
- Sérgio Pena (geneticist), Brazilian human geneticist and professor
