= Fernando Maculan =

Brazilian architect and jewelry designer

Fernando Maculan Assumpção
- Born: 1974 (age 51–52); Belo Horizonte, Brazil
- Education: Federal University of Minas Gerais
- Occupations: Architect, urban planner, industrial designer
- Awards: Antwerp Diamond High Council Award (2003), IAB Architecture Prize (2021, 2022), Tomie Ohtake AkzoNobel Architecture Prize (2021), ArchDaily House of the Year (2023)
- Practice: MACh Architects (since 2010)
- Projects: Lá da Favelinha Cultural Center, House of Kdu dos Anjos

Fernando Maculan Assumpção is a Brazilian architect, urban planner and industrial designer. He has received different awards for architecture and design projects, including the Antwerp Diamond High Council Award in 2003 for jewelry design, the national prizes from the Institute of Architects of Brazil and the Tomie Ohtake Institute AkzoNobel for the Lá da Favelinha Cultural Center project in 2021, and the ArchDaily world House of the Year award in 2023.

== Biography ==
Fernando was born in Belo Horizonte in 1974. He graduated from the School of Architecture of the Federal University of Minas Gerais in 1997.

== Professional activity ==
In his professional work, Maculan engages in architectural and urban projects of different scales, as well as working in graphic design and industrial design. He became notable starting in 2003 when he won the Antwerp Diamond High Council Award in 2003 for the design of a necklace called Hydra, in partnership with designer Adriano Mol.

Since 2010, he has coordinated the MACh Architects office, which he founded together with architect Mariza Machado Coelho.

In 2017, he co-founded, along with architect Joana Magalhães, the LEVANTE Collective, a group composed of residents of the Aglomerado da Serra favela and architects, engineers, surveyors and designers. The group designed the Lá da Favelinha Cultural Center project which, in 2021, won the Tomie Ohtake AkzoNobel architecture prize from the Tomie Ohtake Institute and a prize from the Institute of Architects of Brazil, Minas Gerais section, in 2021, and a national prize from the same institute in 2022.

=== House in the Aglomerado da Serra ===
In 2023, the project won ArchDaily's worldwide "House of the Year" architecture prize in the category for the house of the artist Kdu dos Anjos, located in the Aglomerado da Serra favela in Belo Horizonte. The project was conceived by Fernando and Joana through the LEVANTE Collective. The 66 sqm house utilizes typical favela materials like concrete and exposed bricks, and uses its shape to maximize natural lighting and ventilation.
