= Tony Peña (disambiguation) =

Tony Peña is a former catcher for the Pittsburgh Pirates and coach for the New York Yankees.

Tony Peña may also refer to:

- Tony Peña Jr. (born 1981), his son, pitcher for the Boston Red Sox
- Tony Peña (pitcher) (born 1982), pitcher for the Chicago White Sox
- Villano IV, professional wrestler who used the ringname Tony Pena briefly in World Championship Wrestling

== See also ==
- Antonio Peña (disambiguation)
