= Veterinary College of UFMG =

The College of Veterinary Medicine (CVM) (Escola de Veterinária) was founded in 1932 and since 1974 occupies its own buildings on campus of (Universidade Federal de Minas Gerais) at Pampulha in Belo Horizonte, Minas Gerais, Brazil. Currently it offers two undergraduate courses, Veterinary Medicine and Aquaculture. Specialist, Master and Doctoral graduate courses are available in Animal Science, Epidemiology, Preventive Veterinary Medicine, Pathology, Reproduction and Animal Products Technology and Inspection, and an approved professional master's degree in the field of Animal Health, is under implementation. The residency is a two-year graduate level.

With an area of 7 hectares, the college is divided into four departments: Veterinary Clinic and Surgery (DCCV), Preventive Veterinary Medicine (DMVP), Technology and Inspection of Products of Animal Origin (DTIPOA) and Zootechny (Animal Science) (DZOO).

The administration is carried out by the director and vice-director in conjunction with the College Board, with representatives of the collegiate bodies of the institution, namely the Congregation, Departmental Chambers and undergraduate and graduate collegiate levels. Moreover, it has support structures, such as the Teaching Section, Warehouse, Personnel Section, Purchasing, Accounting, Heritage, Information Technology and General Services.

The unit has also a communication office and its own publishing company, responsible for the publication of various materials, including the Technical Archives of Veterinary and Animal Science (Cadernos Técnicos de Veterinária e Zootecnia) and the Brazilian Archives of Veterinary Medicine (Arquivo Brasileiro de Medicina Veterinária e Zootecnia), one of the most relevant scientific journals in veterinary medicine and animal science of the country.

The CVM has complementary infrastructures. The Veterinary Hospital, which is located also at Pampulha campus, serves large and small domestic animals, in clinic and surgery, with expertise in highly specialized areas, such as dermatology and orthopedics of pets. The Experimental Farm Professor Hélio Barbosa, located in the municipality of Igarapé, supports undergraduate and graduate courses, in addition to conducting research and outreach activities in areas such as dairy cattle, poultry (layer and broiler chickens and quail), rabbits (breeding, nutrition), forage crops, equine breeding, swine farming and effluent management. In the final stage of transfer to UFMG administration, is the farm of Pedro Leopoldo, a third complementary infrastructure to the college. The Farm is a center of integration among different Colleges of UFMG, the extramural community and private sectors, also including teaching, research and outreach activities, focused on the application of sustainable technologies to the rural environment.

== History ==
On 1 March 1932, the Degree in Veterinary was inaugurated at the College of Agriculture of the State of Minas Gerais (ESAV). Installed in Viçosa, Minas Gerais, graduated its first class in 1935, with 4 graduates. In 1942, still tied to the College of Agriculture in Viçosa, the course was transferred to Belo Horizonte, with the name College of Veterinary Medicine (CVM), under the Department of Technical Education of the Department of Agriculture, Trade and Labor of the State of Minas Gerais. In 1948, the Rural University of Minas Gerais (UREMG) was founded, associated with ESAV, and in 1961, it was incorporated into the University of Minas Gerais, which became the Federal University (UFMG) of today.

In 1963, the CVM acquired its first farm of about 240 hectares in the municipality of Igarapé registered as Fazenda Experimental Professor Hélio Barbosa. In 1968, major changes occurred with the introduction of postgraduate courses at Masters level, first in four areas of Veterinary Medicine, and a year later, additional three areas of Animal Science (Zootechny).

The CVM was transferred to the campus of Pampulha in the year of 1974. The building that CVM previously occupied on Avenida Amazonas, was negotiated with the Federal Technical School. From the year 1980, a reformed curriculum was implemented, including among other changes, the extension of the course from 4 to 5 years.

In 2009, the Veterinary College of UFMG inaugurated a degree in Aquaculture, the first of southeastern Brazil.

== The Flight of Birds ==
The tile panel that adorns the façade of the CVM is the work of artist Silas Raposo. Built around the same time of the main auditorium of the school, in the 1980s, and named "Flight of Birds", the panel consists of 855 pieces of clay tiles decorated with images of 34 birds, of different shades and sizes, taking off to flight.

Façade Flight of Birds at the Veterinary College of UFMG

"I designed the panel as a less figurative art, composed of geometric elements. I was inspired by a Chinese puzzle, the tangram, which is based on the subdivision of a square in seven pieces from which we can form numerous figures. I created an image that carries the sense of ancestry knowledge and renewal, "explains the architect Silas Raposo, also responsible for previously designing the Veterinary College, as it was projected for relocation into Pampulha campus in 1974.

"The panel was designed to mark the presence of the school and to represent the union of man with the animal world. And the image of birds strengthens the notion of a story that is born and remains in evolution. I think in the end, the work performed its duty, "said Silas.

As CVM symbolism, confluence of minds and the transmission of knowledge, the panel was used in the creation of the identity for commemorating 80 years of the college.

"The idea was to find another identity that is not confused with the identity of the Ox, already institutionalized. Thus, the panel became the scope of the whole project, the geometric shapes and slopes used to refer to the idea of progress, the endless traffic of people and knowledge that pass through the CVM, "explains André Heneine, intern responsible for establishing the commemorative identity.

== The Ox ==
The Ox sculpture constructed in 1973 by Jarbas Juarez, was cast in fiberglass and polyester resin and occupies a central position in the courtyard of the CVM.

The Ox, Veterinary College, Universidade Federal de Minas Gerais.

It symbolizes an important foundation of the economy and social formation in Minas Gerais and Brazil: beef production, essential milestone of occupation and building the society in the countryside of Brazil, expanding the borders of the country, and representing the vigorous Brazilian cattle industry. Moreover, cattle production is part of Brazilian culture and identity.

Besides integrating the landscape of the CVM courtyard, The Ox was the inspiration for the logo of CVM, and in 1983 it was approved as the symbol of the Veterinary College of UFMG.
