= Carlos Peña (disambiguation) =

Carlos Peña (born 1978) is a baseball first baseman.

Carlos Peña may also refer to:

- Carlos Peña González (born 1959), Chilean lawyer, philosopher and sociologist
- Carlos Peña (Spanish footballer) (born 1983), footballer
- Carlos Peña (singer) (born 1988), Guatemalan singer and songwriter
- Carlos PenaVega (born 1989), American actor and singer
- Carlos Peña (Mexican footballer) (born 1990), footballer
