= Antonio Peña (disambiguation) =

Antonio Peña may refer to:

- Antonio Peña y Goñi (1846–1896), Spanish musicologist
- Antonio Peña Chavarría (1899–1986), Costa Rican physician and politician
- Antonio Peña Díaz (born 1936), Mexican biochemist who received the Carlos J. Finlay Prize for Microbiology (UNESCO, 2003)
- Antonio Peña (1951–2006), Mexican professional wrestling promoter
- Antonio Francisco Peña Padilla, known as Tony Peña, former Dominican catcher in Major League Baseball

== Antonio Pena ==
- Antonio Pena (1894-1947), Uruguayan sculptor

== See also ==
- Tony Peña (disambiguation)
- Antoni Peña (born 1970), Spanish marathon runner
