= Faculty of Medicine, Federal University of Minas Gerais =

Brazilian medical school

Coordinates: 19.871904°S 43.966248°W

Faculty of Medicine of the Federal University of Minas Gerais
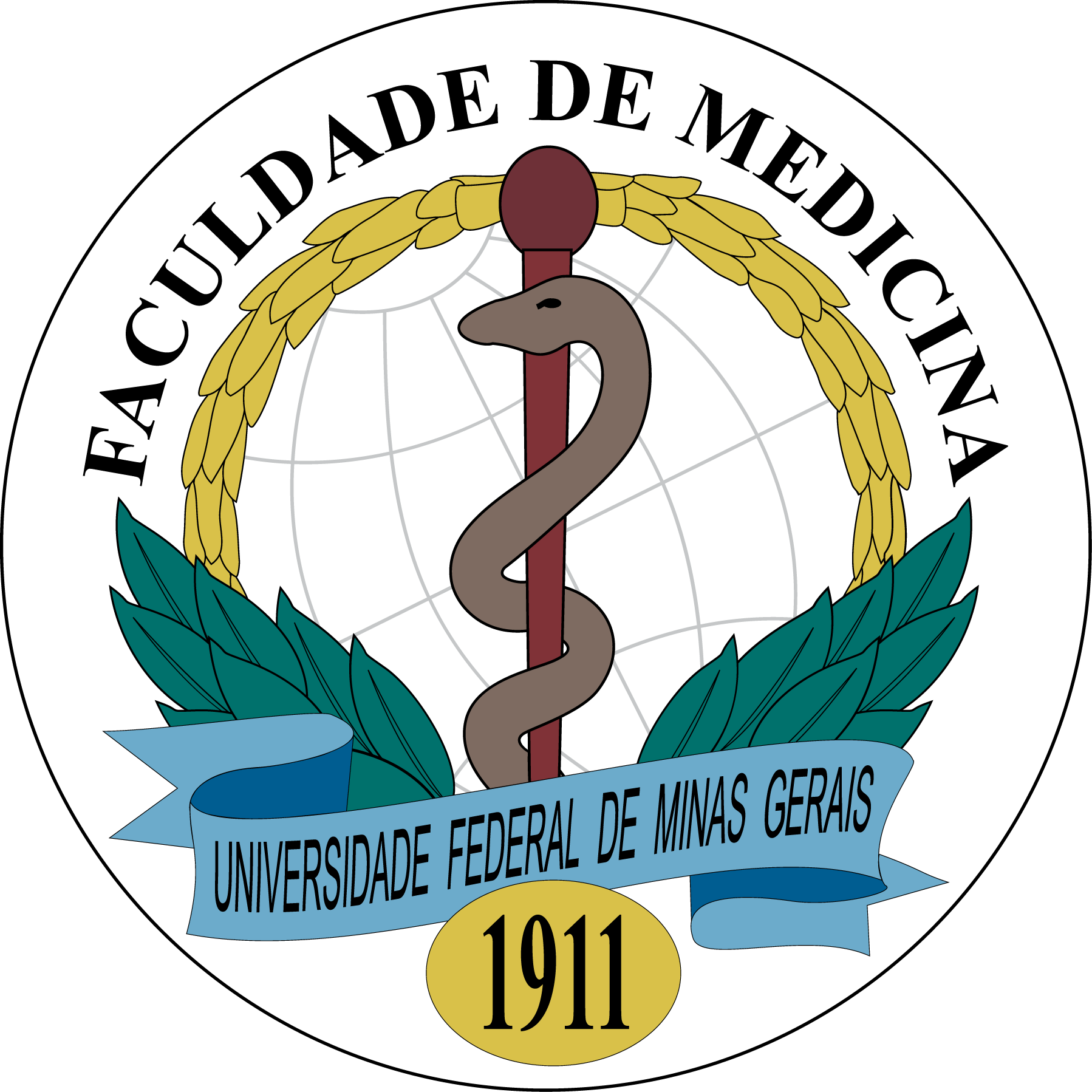
- Type: Public
- Established: 1911; 115 years ago
- Affiliations: Federal University of Minas Gerais
- Faculty: 411
- Students: 2560
- Undergraduates: 1920
- Postgraduates: 640
- Location: Belo Horizonte, Minas Gerais, Brazil
- Campus: 25.6 acres (10.4 ha); Urban
- Website: www.medicina.ufmg.br
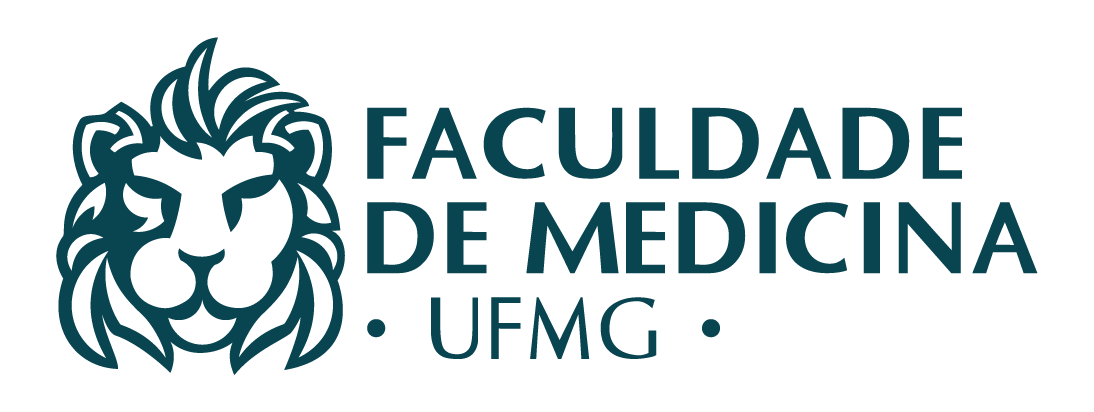

The Faculty of Medicine of the Federal University of Minas Gerais is a subdivision of the Federal University of Minas Gerais. It was founded in 1911 by Italian-born Brazilian doctor Alfredo Balena, shortly after the creation of the capital city of Belo Horizonte, it produces 320 doctors every year, the biggest number of graduates per year in Brazil, and another 50 speech-language therapists.

== History ==
On March 5, 1911, the Medical-Surgical Society of Minas Gerais created the School of Medicine in the city of Belo Horizonte, the fourth school of medicine to be founded in Brazil. It was housed in a stately house in the center of what is now the capital of the state of Minas Gerais. In 1927, the institution integrated the University of Minas Gerais, which was made federal in 1949 with three other tertiary schools that existed in Belo Horizonte: the School of Law, the School of Engineering and the Free School of Dentistry, which included the course on Pharmacy.

The class of 1960 was the inaugural class. The opening lecture was given by President Juscelino Kubitschek de Oliveira, alumnus, benefactor, and honorary professor. In the 1960s, Medical Residency was made available for graduate students in various specialties. Graduate courses were implemented in 1968, with the creation of the Ph.D. in Ophthalmology.

In the last few years, the Faculty of Medicine has also witnessed a considerable increase in faculty tenures and titles, leading to the expansion of numerous research projects and publications, always linked to theoretical and practical instruction for students.

The development of the Faculty of Medicine has been constant. The first class to graduate in 1917 consisted of 17 students of medicine. In 1933, there were 70 graduates. In 1965, the number of ingresses was fixed at 160. In 1969, under pressure from a greater number of professionals in the market, the number doubled to 320, divided into two biannual ingresses. In 2007, the year of the graduation of the 123rd class, a total of 14,740 doctors graduated from this school.

On July 1, 1999, the undergraduate course in Speech-Language Pathology and Audiology was created. The first class entered the university in 2000. Starting in 2010, with the creation of courses on Gerontologic Care and on Radiology and Image Diagnostics Technology, the School graduates professionals capable in the care of the elderly and image technicians, answering an increasing social demand in these areas.

The teaching reform in the Faculty of Medicine in the 1970s revealed the necessity of a greater knowledge of the evolution of healthcare through the ages, and led to the creation of the Center for Memory of the School of Medicine – Cememor, open to visits by the public by appointment.

== Undergraduate Course ==
=== Medicine ===
The main aim of the undergraduate course on Medicine in UFMG is the instruction of general physicians that are competent in the areas of Surgery, Gynecology and Obstetrics, Pediatrics, Internal Medicine, Public Health, and Mental Health. Knowledgeable about these skills and attitudes, the graduate will be a medical doctor able to give quality assistance, acting for the promotion of health, disease prevention, and in the recuperation and rehabilitation of the sick.

The course is divided into four cycles: Basic, from the first to the fourth semester; Propedeutic, composed by the fifth and sixth semesters; Out-patient Ambulatoria, from the seventh to the ninth; and Internships, composed by the last three semesters.

The courses on the Basic Cycle are offered in the Biological Sciences Institute, on the campus situated in Pampulha. From the fifth to the ninth semesters, the courses on clinics are developed with direct contact between students and patients, in groups of ten students supervised by one faculty member. From the tenth onwards, the students take part in the urgent and emergency services, as well as in hospital inpatient care, always under faculty supervision.

The sites for the practical studies varies: laboratories for basic science; clinical analysis; and education technology simulations; outpatient clinics in municipal health centers – in Belo Horizonte and in other towns in the state –, in the university hospitals Hospital das Clínicas (HC) and the Hospital Universitário Risoleta Tolentino Neves; in inpatient units and emergency services in the HC and in the numerous associated hospitals, such as the emergency center Hospital de Pronto Socorro João XXIII.

The Rural Internship, which happens in the eleventh semester of the course, supplements the students’ practical instruction, and has the students acting for three months in municipal services in numerous small towns in the state's countryside, in rural and urban areas. More than a compulsory course, the Rural Internship is considered by students as an incomparable professional and human experience.

Every semester, the Faculty of Medicine receives 160 new students, selected by the UFMG unified entrance examinations, adding to a total of 1920 enrolled students. The faculty includes over 400 professors.

The undergraduate course of medicine at UFMG has been considered the best in the country by the press Editora Abril's Guide for Students in 2006. It received the maximum grade in the National Exam for the Performance of Students (ENADE) and also in the external evaluation for teaching conditions promoted by the National Ministry of Education.

=== Speech-Language Therapy and Audiology ===
The course offered at UFMG proposes a generalist and interdisciplinary formation focused on the scientific and social aspects of Speech-Language Therapy and Audiology. The undergraduate course has a minimum duration of four years and can be concluded in up to 13 semesters. Presently, 50 openings are available each year, divided into biannual ingresses.

The internships start in the fifth semester and include the areas of Speech, Child and Adult Languages, Oral Motion, Child and Adult Audiology, Voice and Public Health. The Speech-Language Therapy and Audiology Outpatient Clinic, where the internships take place in the Hospital das Clínicas facilities, is composed of 11 rooms planned for patient care, which is provided free of charge for the population. Six of these rooms have observation panels, where students can observe and learn from their colleagues.

Faculty includes 42 professors, 19 from the Faculty of Medicine, and 11 speech-language therapists themselves. Apart from the Faculty of Medicine and the Outpatient Clinic, another nine academic units from the university offer Speech-Language Therapy and Audiology courses: the Biological Sciences Institute, the School of Philosophy and Human Sciences, the School of Languages and Arts, the School of Music, the School of Physical Education, Physiotherapy and Occupational Therapy, the Exact Sciences Institute, the School of Dentistry, the School for Information Sciences, and the Nursing School.

== Graduate Courses ==
The UFMG Faculty of Medicine offers many Graduate Courses stricto sensu and lato sensu with active production and steady expansion, besides Medical Residency in the Hospital das Clínicas.

=== Stricto sensu ===
Ever since the creation of the first graduate course in 1968, over a thousand MA theses and about 400 PhD dissertations have been approved at the UFMG Faculty of Medicine. Presently, there are about 420 students enrolled. Graduate courses stricto sensu in the Faculty of Medicine include the following programs, all offered at MA and PhD levels:

- Ophthalmology and Surgery Applied Sciences
- Adult Care Applied Sciences
- Health Sciences – Child and Adolescent Care
- Health Sciences – Infectiology and Tropical Medicine
- Pathology
- Women Care
- Public Health

=== Lato sensu ===
Graduate courses lato sensu include five specializations in the area of Pediatrics; Gastroenterology, Pneumology, Endocrinology, Cardiology, and Adolescent Care. The Department of Preventive and Social Medicine offers many courses in the areas of Public Health, focusing on Health Services Management and Workers’ Health, among others, some of them offered by the Center for the Education in Public Health (Nescon), that also offers specialization courses in the areas of Basic Care and Family Health, and Epidemiology.

=== Medical Residency ===
The Medical Residency is a graduate course on the same level as the specialization, developed as a supervised program of in-service instruction, which aims at the development of qualified professionals in specific areas of medicine.

At UFMG it is developed in the Hospital das Clínicas (HC) and in the Hospital Universitário Risoleta Tolentino Neves. The Medical Residency in Family Health is offered in the towns of Belo Horizonte, Tiradentes e Brumadinho. Agreements for the extension of the program to other towns are underway.

The Hospital das Clínicas offers 41 programs of Medical Residency, all accredited by the national Ministry of Education. The programs have a minimal duration of two years and a maximum of five, depending on the specialty. Another seven Residency programs are available at Hospital Universitário Risoleta Tolentino Neves.

Students are selected by means of an examination promoted by the Medical Residency Coordination (Coreme). Applications can be submitted in October every year, and the exams take place in November and December, in two phases consisting of objective questions on general knowledge of Medicine and the analysis of the students’ curricula.

== Extension Programs ==
The extension programs developed at the UFMG Faculty of Medicine seek to establish educational, cultural, and scientific interactions between University and society. This relation allows the students to elaborate on the praxis of academic knowledge, by means of an interdisciplinary work based on the contact with the Brazilian national and regional realities.

The community, on the other hand, effectively takes part in this process, and can intervene in University actions.

Created in 1976, the UFMG Faculty of Medicine Extension Center offers courses, seminars, conference cycles and other activities for the academic community, healthcare professionals and for the community at large.

== Research and Scientific Production ==
The research activity in the UFMG Faculty of Medicine goes as far back as the creation of the school, and has become traditional in many areas. In the last few years, the number of lines of research and research groups has increased significantly. An expanding number of undergraduate students are also taking part in research developed as scientific initiation programs.

The School has dozens of laboratories and has important national and international funding partners, including Fapemig, Finep, Capes, CNPq, and the European Union, besides UFMG's own Office for Research Affairs.

Among the areas that concentrate lines of research developed at the UFMG School of Medicine, we can find Infectious and Parasite Diseases; Medical and Compared Pathology; Epidemiology, Health Service Management and Worker's Health, Internal Medicine, Gynecology, Fetal Medicine and Obstetrics; Experimental Surgery, Surgery of the Digestive System, and Neurosurgery; Ophthalmology; Neurosciences; Child and Adolescent Health; and Microbiology of the Digestive System.

== Faculty and departments ==
The UFMG Faculty of Medicine is composed of eleven departments and has 411 faculty members. The faculty has 243 (59%) PhD-level professors, 85 (21%) at the MA level, and 83 (20%) specialists. In 2006, 51 (12.4%) of these specialists were pursuing better qualifications.

The UFMG Faculty of Medicine faculty take part in teaching, research, extension, and administration. The majority (232 or 56% in 2006) is on an exclusive work regimen for the university and are not to be employed elsewhere. A significant number of professors are employed in the partial regimen, and thus keep their activities in the health systems.

In the past years, there was an intense expansion in the number of books, chapters and articles published in scientific journals, rising from 0.5 per faculty member in 1990 to 1.9 in 2006. The number of projects trebled in the last 16 years, reaching a total of 973 in 2006.

The participation of faculty in events totaled 1,899, and the number of advisees (both in the undergraduate and graduate levels, including medical residency) was 1,692 in 2006, thus reflecting the intense activity of faculty in the areas of teaching, research, and extension.

== Life on Campus ==
=== Cultural Activities ===
The academic community at the Faculty of Medicine has always taken part in a variety of cultural initiatives. Among them were writers such as Guimarães Rosa and Pedro Nava. Presently, the Health & Culture program, a partnership with the Nursing School and the Hospital das Clínicas, promotes theatrical, musical, and dance events, as well as movies and exhibitions.

=== Students’ Organizations ===
In the Faculty of Medicine we can find active the Diretório Acadêmico Alfredo Balena (DAAB), which represents the medical students, and the DAFono, the entity for the students of Speech-Language Therapy and Audiology.

=== Alfredo Balena Academic Directory (DAAB) ===
The origin of the Alfredo Balena Academic Directory (DAAB), formerly called the Academic Center of the Faculty of Medicine (CAFM), is mixed with the origin of the Faculty of Medicine itself. Apparently, the CAFM was founded in October 1913. In 1920, CAFM launched his first periodical - “Radium” - which was dedicated not only to academic publications in the various areas of medicine, but also to news about the new capital of Minas Gerais, Belo Horizonte, which was still flourishing.

After the death of Professor Alfredo Balena, the then CAFM was renamed DAAB and, a year later, in 1960, as part of the commemorations of the 50th anniversary of the Faculty of Medicine, the new headquarters was inaugurated, with 450m2. At the same time, the DAAB created the Freshman Reception and already represented a pleasant refuge for academics.

On the pages of Jornal PH7, a serial created by the students in 1946, many have already written about characters and facts that made UFMG. The publication was a focus of resistance during the Military Dictatorship and contributed to important changes in medical curricula. Currently, PH7 is no longer published. Despite that, the DAAB continues to work to improve teaching at FM-UFMG and to make the student's voices heard within Collegiate meetings and Departmental Chambers.

The history of the DAAB is long, but it has always meant resistance and defense of democracy. It was at DAAB that the 3rd National Student Meeting took place in 1977, a milestone in the union of students in the fight against the Dictatorship. The motto “For Education as the Practice of Freedom” is representative of what the management of this Directory proposes to build together with the academic community each year.

=== Conclave Médico Desportivo (CMD) ===
The Medical Sports Union, called Conclave Médico Desportivo (CMD), was created in 1996 to promote the integration of medical students in sports activities, before that the student sports issues were part of a DAAB coordination. The Conclave Médico Desportivo organizes the UFMG Faculty of Medicine participation in the Minas Gerais Intermed, which gathers students from all medical courses statewide in sports matches. The UFMG was the winner for the 14th consecutive year in 2009. And in 2022 won its 23rd title.

=== Center for Psycho-pedagogic Support for Students at the Faculty of Medicine - Napem ===
Created in 2004, the Center for Psycho-pedagogic Support for Students at the Faculty of Medicine (Napem) welcomes medical students that have some kind of emotional problem interfering with their academic life. The Napem also takes part in cultural activities, debates and research on emotional issues that affect the students’ as well as the professionals’ lives. Once a month, a free movie session is open to the public. The screening is followed by commentaries and a debate. Napem is organized in partnership with the students’ organization Diretório Acadêmico Alfredo Balena (DAAB).

=== Show Medicine ===
A theatrical comedy, characterized by social criticism and irony, on various themes that include, of course, the medical practice. The Show Medicine is annually organized by the Theatrical Group of Adroit Academics (Grutaa), which includes around 80 amateur artists, all students of the UFMG Faculty of Medicine. They are responsible for the text, costumes, make-up, lighting, and all that is part of the theatrical pieces. Show Medicine was created in 1954 and its activities were only interrupted during the years of the Brazilian Military Dictatorship because of censorship. The Show Medicine has become a tradition, with a record audience in the space Teatro Sesiminas for eleven consecutive years.

=== Alumni Association ===
Idealized by Professor Baeta Viana, the Association was founded in 1953 in order to maintain a permanent link between alumni and the Faculty of Medicine. In 1985 the Alumni Room was created and became a dedicated space in the Faculty of Medicine building where monthly meetings are held. Additionally, every year solemn ceremonies take place so as to celebrate 25 and 50 years of graduation, where alumni receive a commemorative diploma.

== Structure ==
The Faculty of Medicine is located in the UFMG Health campus, on an area of 104,000 m2 in the hospital district in central Belo Horizonte. The School building alone occupies a total of 24,000 m2. Located in it and in the other buildings are dozens of laboratories dedicated to teaching and research and to the extension services, as well as support services such as the library, food hall, bookshop, pharmacy, and banks.

=== University Hospitals ===
The Federal University of Minas Gerais keeps two hospitals for the practical instruction of students in the health areas: the Hospital das Clínicas, situated on the Health campus, in the central area of Belo Horizonte, and the Hospital Universitário Risoleta Tolentino Neves, in the northern district Venda Nova. The two hospitals have complementary roles, divided between specialized assistance and emergency services.

==== The Hospital das Clínicas Compound ====
Opened in 1928, the Hospital das Clínicas (HC) is a compound which includes the main building – Hospital São Vicente de Paulo – and seven annex buildings designed for outpatient services: Ambulatório Bias Fortes, Anexo Oswaldo Costa, Ambulatório São Vicente, Hospital Borges da Costa, Hospital São Geraldo, the Orestes Diniz Center for Training and Reference in Infectious and Parasite Diseases, and the new Jenny Faria Center for the Care of Elderly and Women, as well as the Interns’ Hall of Residence Anexo Maria Guimarães.

A special unit inside UFMG, the university public hospital houses activities in teaching, research and assistance. It is a reference for the municipal and state health systems in the care of patients with infirmities of medium and high complexity. It monthly provides 25,000 walk-in consultations, with a mean of 1,600 inpatients, 2,000 surgical procedures and 280 births of medium and high complexity.

==== Hospital Universitário Risoleta Tolentino Neves ====
The Hospital Universitário Risoleta Tolentino Neves (HRTN) is managed by the UFMG since June 2006. It is situated in Venda Nova, a northern district of Belo Horizonte, and in the opposite direction of the city's hospital district. With a mean of 12,000 monthly consultations, it pays a significant contribution to the regionalization of healthcare in Belo Horizonte.

Compared to the Hospital das Clínicas, which focuses on medical specialties, the main goal of this new University Hospital is the assistance to trauma and non-trauma emergencies. This unit stands out for the services in Orthopedics, General Surgery, and Internal Medicine, as well as in the areas of Pediatrics, Plastic Surgery, Vascular Surgery, Neurology, Anesthesia, and in Maternity.

The hospital has a built area of 22,000 m2. It operates with 272 beds and six surgical rooms, where 400 surgical procedures take place every month. The HRTN has over 150 students from the medicine and Speech-Language Therapy and Audiology courses, as well as ten interns from Medical Residency.

=== J. Baeta Vianna Library ===
Located on a building with a total area of 3152 m^{2}, distributed onto four floors, the Peripheral Library in the Health campus receives over 100,000 monthly consults. Linked to the UFMG Library System, constituted of 28 units, it is a modern center for information services, with internet access and book check-out, with a total of over 53,000 volumes.

The Library also offers research facilities, normalization and interlibrary loans, as well as training for users, with courses on bibliographical research and on the writing of research papers. The website gives access to over 90 databases with abstracts and articles in various fields, and also to the Capes Portal electronic periodicals, which makes available full-text electronic copies of articles published in approximately 11,000 national and international journals.

Part of the Brazilian Network on Health Sciences Information and the Latin-American and Caribbean Center on Health Sciences Information (BIREME), the Library is responsible for collecting, keeping, and processing the scientific documentation produced in the state of Minas Gerais, and feeding into the database of the Latin-American Health Sciences-Public Health Literature (LILACS-SP).

=== Technology ===
The Health Technology Center (Cetes) coordinates all activities in this area.

One of its initiatives is the Simulation Laboratory, where, every semester, over 500 students use computers, mannequins, anatomic models, and equipment for the reproduction of procedures such as gynecology exams, cardio-pulmonary resuscitation practices, tracheal intubation, and the administering of medication.

In the Center for Tele-health (Nutel), information and communication technologies are used as tools for the qualification of health professionals and for the discussion of clinical cases in videoconferences and long-distance consultations. It produces courses and teaching materials for distance learning, with resources such as 3D models and video. This pioneering experience, initiated in 2003 in partnership with the Belo Horizonte Municipal Authorities, contributes to the implementation of the National Tele-health Program, administered by the Ministry of Health, also in partnership with the State of Minas Gerais Health Authority. Nutel also has many international partners, including the European Union.

== See also ==
- Brazil University Rankings
- Universities and Higher Education in Brazil
