= List of presidents of the Associação Brasileira de Estatística =

The President of the Associação Brasileira de Estatística is the highest officer of the Associação Brasileira de Estatística (ABE).

== List of presidents ==
=== 20th Century ===
- 1984-1986 Djalma Galvão Carneiro Pessoa
- 1986-1988 Wilton de Oliveira Bussab
- 1988-1990 Carlos Alberto de Bragança Pereira
- 1990-1992 Ruben Klein
- 1992-1994 Clóvis de A. Peres
- 1994-1996 Pedro Alberto Morettin
- 1996-1998 Heleno Bolfarine
- 1998-2000 Hélio S. Migon

=== 21st Century ===
- 2000-2002 Gauss Moutinho Cordeiro
- 2002-2004 Clélia M. C. Toloi
- 2004-2006 Lúcia Pereira Barroso
- 2006-2008 Wilton de Oliveira Bussab
- 2008-2010 Silvia R. C. Loopes
- 2010-2012 Luiz Koodi Hotta
- 2012-2014 Francisco Louzada Neto
- 2014-2016 Vera Lucia Damasceno Tomazella
- 2016-2018 Francisco Louzada Neto
- 2018-2020 Flávio Augusto Ziegelmann
- 2020-2022 Marcos Prates
- 2022-2024 Viviana Giampaoli
- 2024-2026 Flávio Augusto Ziegelmann

== See also ==
- President of the American Statistical Association
- President of the Institute of Mathematical Statistics
- President of the Royal Statistical Society
- President of the Statistical Society of Canada
