= Carlos Alberto Barbosa Dantas =

Brazilian statistician (born 1936)

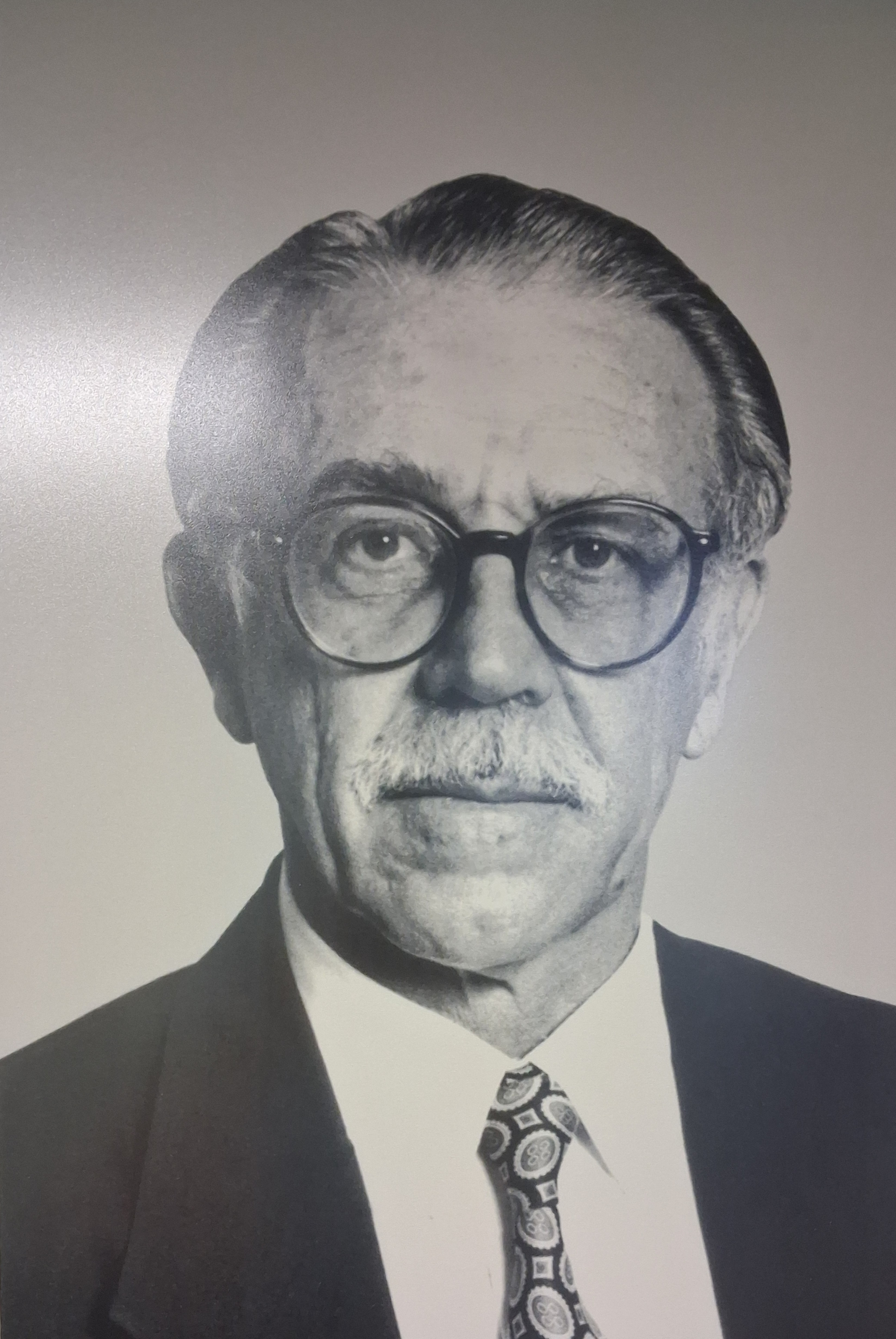
- Born: Nuporanga, Brazil
- Education: University of California, Berkeley
- Scientific career
- Thesis: The Existence of Stationary Optimal Plans (1966)
- Doctoral advisor: David Blackwell
- Doctoral students: Antonio Galves

Carlos Alberto Barbosa Dantas (born May 23, 1936) is a Brazilian statistician. He is professor emeritus at the Institute of Mathematics, Statistics and Computer Science, University of São Paulo, where he was director between 1982 and 1986. Dantas also served as the university's undergraduate pro-rector and collaborated with the original report on the Battle of Maria Antônia.

Dantas was born in Nuporanga, São Paulo, on May 23, 1936. He earned a bachelor's degree in physics from the University of São Paulo in 1959. He earned a master's degree in 1964 and doctorate in statistics in 1966 from the University of California, Berkeley. His advisor was David Blackwell.

Dantas served as the head of the Department of Statistical Methods at the Institute of Mathematics and Statistics at the University of São Paulo from 1976 to 1981 and director of the institute from 1982 to 1986.

Together with Ofelia Teresa Alas, he was given the title of professor emeritus in 2025.

Dantas is a member of the Conselho Regional de Estatística (CONRE3) and the Brazilian Statistical Association.

== Bibliography ==
=== Books ===
- Probability: An Introductory Course (1997)
