= Carlos Benjamin de Lyra =

Brazilian mathematician

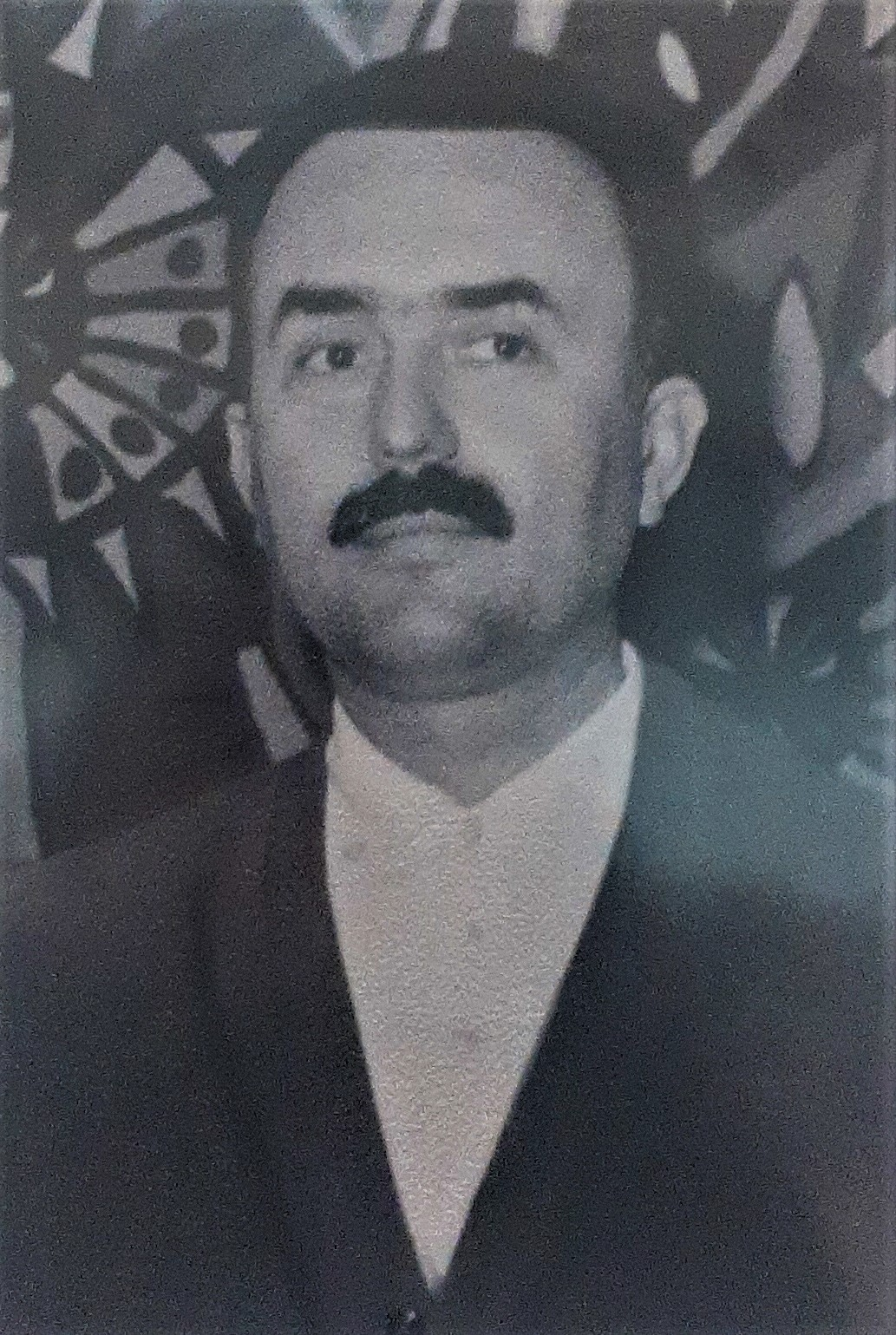
- Born: November 23, 1927
- Died: July 21, 1974 (aged 46)
- Education: Faculdade de Filosofia, Ciências e Letras, University of São Paulo
- Occupations: Mathematician, university professor
- Employer(s): University of São Paulo, Instituto de Matemática e Estatística
- Spouse: Leda Lacerda de Lyra
- Children: Jorge Lacerda de Lyra, Sylvia Lacerda de Lyra, Eduardo Lacerda de Lyra

Carlos Benjamin de Lyra (Pernambuco, 23 November 1927 – São Paulo, 21 July 1974) was a prominent Brazilian mathematician, a pioneer in algebraic topology in Brazil and professor at the University of São Paulo.

Born in Recife, Pernambuco, he came from a family of sugarcane plantation owners and his dad was the owner of the Diário de Pernambuco, a newspaper that was known nationwide. Lyra was an important mathematician in his area, his course Introdução à Topologia Algébrica was taught in the first Colóquio Brasileiro de Matemática and would become the first text in this field written in Brazilian Portuguese.

After the death of his father, his mother married a Wall Street stockbroker and, together, the couple moved to New York City with Lyra and his younger brother. When he was 15, in the suburbs of the city where he lived, he met Richard Courant. The founder of the presently named Courant Institute of Mathematical Sciences was responsible for inspiring de Lyra to study mathematics.

Lyra made a substantial career for himself throughout his life. Beginning as associate professor at the University of São Paulo alongside Elza Gomide, he helped to organize and administrate a course in the 1° Colóquio Brasileiro de Matemática, he became a doctor in Mathematics with his thesis Sobre os espaços de mesmo tipo de homotopia que o dos poliedros, he was one of the founders of the Sociedade Brasileira de Matemática, he was involved in the creation of the Instituto de Matemática e Estatística at the University of São Paulo (IME-USP), taught as a professor in a variety of courses, and participated in the restructuring of the undergraduate and postgraduate courses in Mathematics at the University of São Paulo.

On the 21st of July 1974, Carlos Benjamin de Lyra died due to a brain tumour. His thesis H-equivalencia de grupos topológicos, was revised and published by his friend Peter Hilton. In his honor, the library at the IME-USP bears his name, along with a road in the Chácara São João neighbourhood, in the capital of São Paulo.

== Early life ==
=== Early years and education ===
Carlos Benjamin de Lyra was born in the city of Recife in Pernambuco on the 23rd of November 1927. His parents were Carlos de Lyra Filho, a sugarcane plantation owner and owner of the Pernambuco Daily newspaper which received a lot of national attention, and Elizabeth Lau de Lyra, a German woman that came to Brazil with her family. The marriage between them was arranged due to how close the two families were in business and faith. Carlos de Lyra Filho came from an earlier marriage, where he had five sons, where after the death of his first wife he remarried with Elizabeth, where they had two children: Carlos and George.

Carlos Benjamin de Lyra's father died when he was 9 years old. Widowed, his mother married Paul Nortz, a stockbroker at Wall Street. Together, the family, including the children, moved to New York City.

Lyra did not go to school during his early years, he was instead home schooled by a tutor who taught German in this time. In the United States, he studied in Catholic schools, and finished his primary education and middle school at Iona High School, New Rochelle. Around the age of 15, Lyra met the researcher and founder of the Institute of New York University, Richard Courant (1888–1972), during one of his daily train journeys. It was Courant that provided Lyra his interest in Mathematics, whereas his earlier stated interest was in astronomy.

=== Return to Brazil ===
By the end of middle school, Lyra had the opportunity to obtain US citizenship and follow the wishes of his stepfather who wanted to see him work in Wall Street and study in a university which would accept him, including Yale. But he refused this, as he had an attachment to Brazil and was critical of US society and culture. In 1945, returning to Brazil after the end of the Second World War, Lyra enlisted himself in the Brazilian Army to continue his path to citizenship and spend some time living with his brothers from his father's earlier marriage as guardians until he turned 18. The following year, he would move to São Paulo, living in the home of Manuel Tavares, a lawyer and friend of the family, and soon begin his study of Mathematics.

=== Family and early career ===
In São Paulo, 1947, Lyra began studying Mathematics under the former Faculdade de Filosofia, Ciências e Letras of the University of São Paulo (FFCL). During this time, he would meet French mathematicians André Weil (1906–1998) and Jean Dieudonné (1906–1992), and have lectures with Professor Cândido Lima da Silva Dias (1913–1998) on the topic of algebraic topology, the area of study he would pursue during the rest of his career.

After graduating in 1950, Lyra developed an interest in algebraic topology when he attended a course on the Theory of Simplicial Homology, which was administrated by Professor Cândido Lima, on the year of his graduation. With this, he travelled to France in 1952 to take part in a postgraduate program with funding from the Conselho Nacional de Pesquisas (CNPq). He met and studied with Henri Cartan and participated in seminars and watched Hurewicz's lectures on homotopy in the Collège de France in Paris.

During his time in France, Lyra met Leda Lacerda, a woman from Rio de Janeiro and graduated in physics from the Faculdade Nacional de Filosofia. Lacerda was in Europe at that time to study in the European Institute of Physics. After meeting Lyra, they began their relationship and they moved to the Hotel des Grands Hommes, in Paris, where they would remain until the end of their stay in France. A short time later. Leda became pregnant with their first son and returned to Brazil, with Lyra following soon after completing his postgraduation. Together in Brazil, they were married in the home of Lasar Segall, father of the artist Maurício Segall, a friend of the couple.

In 1954, Jorge Lacerda de Lyra was born. In all, Carlos and Leda had 3 children: Jorge, Sylvia (1956) and Eduardo (1958). In that same year, Carlos was hired by the FFCL, together with Elza Gomide, and became associate professor in the Cátedra de Análise Matemática which was headed by Professor Omar Catunda. This began his academic career in the University of São Paulo.

== Academic career ==
=== University of São Paulo ===
Lyra continued as associate professor in the Cátedra de Análise Matemática until 1958. Influenced by a visiting professor at the USP, Alexander Grothendieck, Carlos learnt about cohomology, furthering his interest of topology. In 1956, Carlos organized a weekly seminar on algebraic topology, where they would discuss important topics from this field.

He defended his doctorate thesis in 1958, titled Sobre os espaços de mesmo tipo de homotopia que o dos poliedros, with Cândido Lima da Silva Dias advising him. He received funding from the Rockefeller Foundation in 1961 and moved his family to New Jersey, where he visited the Institute for Advanced Study at Princeton. This advanced his understanding of cohomological operations and, through the advising of John Milnor (1931 -), he developed his study in differential topology.

Concerned that he would not be allowed to return to Brazil due to his socialist affiliation, Lyra returned after one year in New Jersey out of the two years the original funding provided for. After receiving his familial inheritance, he bought a house in Vila Mariana. In 1963, he became the coordinator of the night course of Mathematical analysis in the Departamento de Matemática of the USP, until 1970.

Carlos was a fundamental figure in the creation of the Instituto de Matemática e Estatística of USP (IME-USP) in January 1970. In 1972, he was hired as a Senior Professor. He was recognised as a professor and researcher who was dedicated and inspired students and colleagues.

In 1968 he defended his postgraduate thesis, titled H-Equivalência de grupos topológicos, leading to him obtaining the title of Professor in Complements in Geometry and Superior Geometry at the FFCL.

=== Colóquios de Matemática ===
Lyra as a professor frequently participated in events such as the Colóquios de Matemática. It was in the first Colóquio Brasileiro de Matemática in which he led a course based on his doctorate (Introdução à Topologia Algébrica), and on the fifth and seventh he presented once again. He also participated on the Comissão Organizadora of the reunion in his first year, coordinated a commission in the Colóquio, and participated once again in the sixth.

In 1967, during the sixth Colóquio Brasileiro de Matemática, Lyra integrated a commission whose aim was to define the scientific character and the organization of the Escola Latino-Americana de Matemática. This commission was composed of the professors: Emilio Lluis (Mexico), Orlando Villamayor (Argentina) and Carlos Benjamin de Lyra (Brazil). Working together, they produced a document which was then approved by the plenary.

=== Mathematical Societies ===
Between 1966 and 1967, Lyra was the elected president of the Sociedade de Matemática de São Paulo, however it did not last for very long and, before its end, he had one published work in the Diário Oficial do Estado de São Paulo.

Years later, in 1969, he was one of the founders of the Sociedade Brasileira de Matemática, and was elected as one of four advisors. His mandate lasted until 1972, and later, he became the Secretary General.

== Death ==
In his final years, Lyra continued to be active in his work. After the creation of the IME-USP in 1970, he was chosen by the CNPq to be a conference professor and, two years later, nominated, by the president of the CNPq, to be the Brazilian representative in the Permanent Commission of the Escola Latino-Americana de Matemática (ELAM). However, in the period, Lyra lost one of his sons. Eduardo Lacerda de Lyra died in 1971, 12 years-old, in an accident at the beach.

In his final year, Lyra passed the exam for becoming a professor, wrote and turned in his Memorial to become an adjunct professor of the IME. Curiously, Carlos had the habit of telling his friends that he would die early and, according to Jorge and Sylvia, the men in their family lived relatively short lives, this be confirmed with his own early death.

On the 21st of July 1974, 46 years-old, Carlos Benjamin de Lyra died. After feeling ill, he was hospitalized for four days and diagnosed with having a brain tumour. According to Leda, Carlos returned home on the condition that he would return to the hospital in three days. This period at home gave him sufficient time to finish an article he was in the process of writing and nothing more.

His thesis for becoming a professor was revised and submitted postmortem for publishing by his friend Peter Hilton who also brought with him the article that Lyra left in his office to England to be published under the title "SHM-maps of CW-groups".

== Political views ==
Lyra was described as a socialist intellectual and, between the years of 1950 and 1955, was a member of the Partido Socialista Brasileiro, having such colleagues as Paul Singer, Febus Gikovate, among others. One of the reasons for not pursuing US citizenship was because of his critical views of the country.

He was also an acting member of the Commissão de Elaboração do Livro Branco, on the outcomes of the event that occurred in the Maria Antônia street of São Paulo, acting as a rapporteur. The events of that day, caused by conflicts between students of the University of São Paulo and students of the Instituto Presbiteriyear Mackenzie during Brazil's military dictatorship, came to be known as the Battle of Maria Antônia.

== Major works ==
=== Periodical publications ===
- 1976: SHM-maps of CW-groups
- 1975: Caracterização dos SHM-Morfismos para grupos topológicos
- 1965: On a conjecture in homotopy theory
- 1959: On circle bundles over complex projective space
- 1958: On the homotopy type of a factor space
- 1957: On spaces of the some homotopy type as polyhedra
- 1952: Minimal complexes and maps
- 1949: A note on Zorn's theorem

=== Books ===
- 1972: Introdução à topologia algébrica. 2.ed. – Notas Mimeografadas.
- 1963: Sobre os métodos de Whitehead na teoria da homotopia – Notas Mimeografadas.
- 1957–58: Espaços de recobrimento – Cap. 2–3

=== Presentations and lectures ===
- 1969: Grupo fundamental e revestimentos – 7° Colóquio Brasileiro de Matemática.
- 1965: Sobre uma conjetura na teoria da homotopia – 5° Colóquio Brasileiro de Matemática.
- 1957: Introdução à topologia algébrica – 1° Colóquio Brasileiro de Matemática.

=== Theses ===
- 1968: H-equivalencia de grupos topológicos – Livre-Docência.
- 1958: Sobre os espaços de mesmo tipo de homotopia que o dos poliedros – Doutorado.

== Scientific societies ==
- Academia Brasileira de Ciências
- American Mathematical Society
- Sociedade Brasileira de Matemática
- Sociedade Brasileira para o Progresso da Ciência
- Sociedade de Matemática de São Paulo

== See also ==
- Institute of Mathematics and Statistics, University of São Paulo
- Partido Socialista Brasileiro
- Anais da Academia Brasileira de Ciências
