= Diniz =

Diniz is a Portuguese-language surname. It may refer to:

- Denis of Portugal (1261–1325), the sixth King of Portugal and the Algarve
- Abilio Diniz (1936–2024), Brazilian businessman, father of Pedro
- Alex Diniz (born 1985), Brazilian cyclist
- Ângela Diniz (1944–1976), Brazilian socialite
- Clelio Campolina Diniz (born 1942), Brazilian mechanical engineer
- Fernando Diniz (born 1974), Brazilian football coach
- Gabriel Diniz (1990–2019), Brazilian singer and composer
- Jacinto F. Diniz (1888–1949), American politician
- Leila Diniz (1945–1972), Brazilian actress
- Mauro Diniz (born 1952), Brazilian cavaquinist and singer
- Paulo Diniz (1940–2022), Brazilian singer
- Paulo Roberto Diniz Jr. (fl. 1990s–2010s), Brazilian bass guitarist
- Pedro Diniz (born 1970), Brazilian racing driver, son of Abílio
- Priscillo Diniz (born 1948), Brazilian golfer
- Renan Diniz (born 1993), Brazilian footballer
- Renata Diniz (born 1985), Brazilian footballer
- Renata Diniz (gymnast) (born 2008), Brazilian rhythmic gymnast
- Yohann Diniz (born 1978), French race walker
