= Marco Antonio Raupp =

Brazilian mathematician and politician (1938–2021)

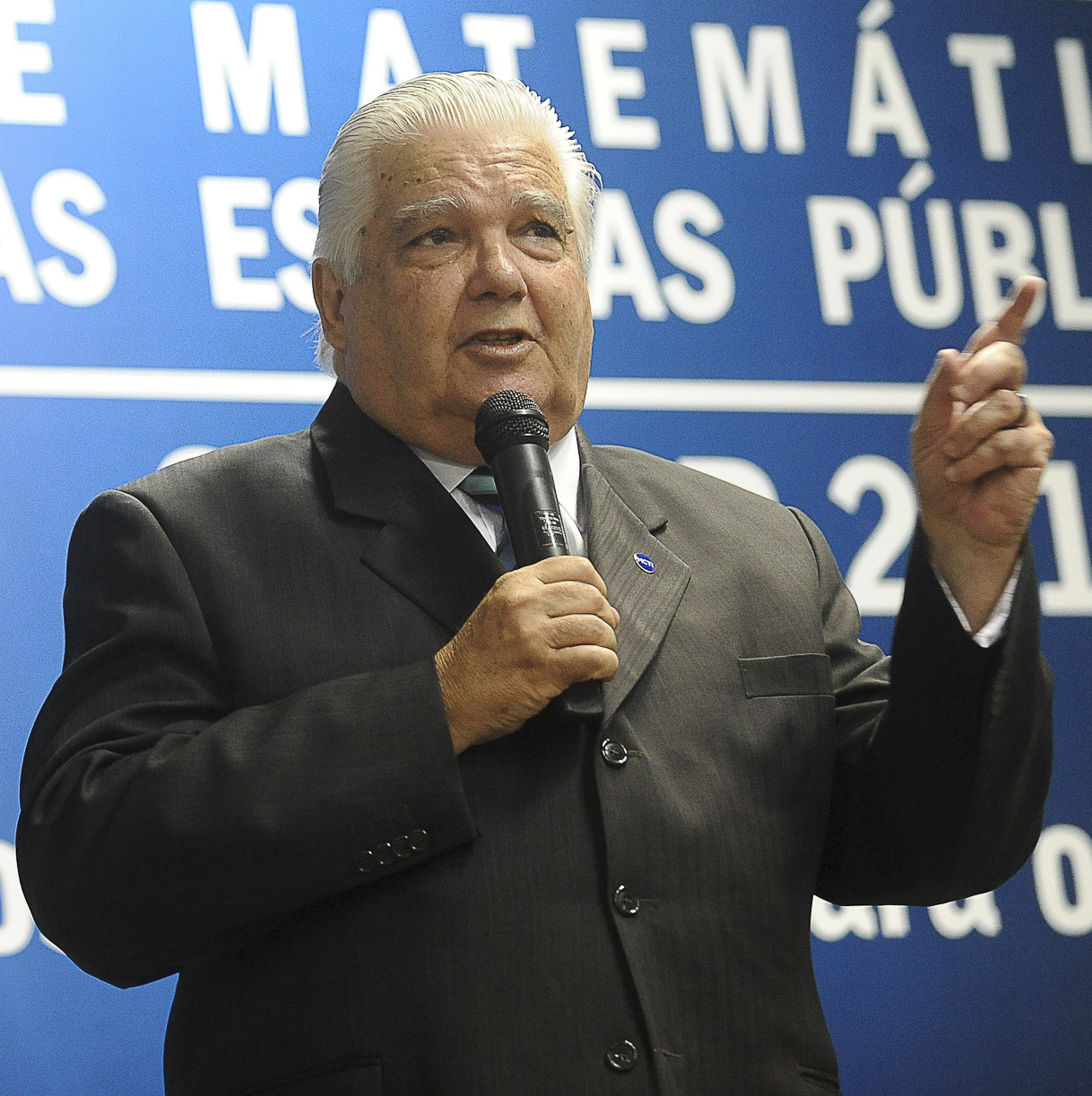
- Raupp in 2012

Minister of Science, Technology and Innovation
- In office 24 January 2012 – 17 March 2014
- President: Dilma Rousseff
- Preceded by: Aloizio Mercadante
- Succeeded by: Clelio Campolina Diniz

Personal details
- Born: 9 July 1938 Cachoeira do Sul, Brazil
- Died: 24 July 2021 (aged 83) São José dos Campos, Brazil

Marco Antonio Raupp (9 July 1938 – 24 July 2021) was a Brazilian mathematician and politician. He served as Director of the National Institute for Space Research, President of the Sociedade Brasileira para o Progresso da Ciência, and Minister of Science, Technology and Innovation.

== Biography ==
Raupp studied at the Federal University of Rio Grande do Sul and held a PhD in mathematics from the University of Chicago. He was a professor at the University of São Paulo's Institute of Mathematics and Statistics and the University of Brasília. He was also head researcher at the Laboratório Nacional de Computação Científica (LNCC).

For his contributions as head of the LNCC and his various professorships, Raupp became a Commander of the Order of Rio Branco and of the National Order of Scientific Merit. He later served as President of the Sociedade Brasileira de Matemática Aplicada e Computacional. He was a member of the International Academy of Astronautics and was Director of the Parque Tecnológico de São José dos Campos. He also served as President of the Brazilian Space Agency.

On 24 January 2012, Raupp was appointed by President Dilma Rousseff to be Minister of Science, Technology and Innovation, replacing Aloizio Mercadante. He left the position on 17 March 2014 following ministerial reforms led by President Rousseff.

On 10 July 2016, Raupp was involved in a serious traffic collision which caused him to undergo surgery and enter into a medically-induced coma.

Marco Antonio Raupp died of acute respiratory failure resulting from a brain tumor in São José dos Campos on 24 July 2021 at the age of 83.
