= Ofelia Teresa Alas =

Brazilian mathematician (born 1943)

- Born: 4 July 1943 (age 83); São Paulo, Brazil

Academic background
- Education: University of São Paulo
- Thesis: Sobre uma Extensão do Conceito de Compacidade e suas Aplicações
- Doctoral advisor: Edison Farah

Academic work
- Discipline: Mathematics
- Main interests: Topology and set theory

Ofelia Teresa Alas (born 4 June 1943) is Brazilian mathematician and professor emeritus at the Institute of Mathematics and Statistics, University of São Paulo. She served as its vice-dean in the years from 1990 to 1994, under Pedro Alberto Morettin's warrant. Alas is a researcher in the fields of topology and set theory. She is notable for being the second Brazilian woman to obtain a PhD in mathematics from a Brazilian institution.

== Early life ==
Ofelia Alas was born in São Paulo, Brazil on 4 June 1943, daughter of a engineer and a piano teacher. Since childhood, she had showed interest in mathematics.

== Career ==
Alas obteined a bachelor's and licence degree in mathematics in 1964 from the University of São Paulo.

In 1965, she became the only woman to receive a fellowship to develop activities in Instituto de Pesquisas Matemáticas at USP.

She finished her master's degree in 1967 with the thesis Seis proposições equivalentes ao Teorema de Zermelo and her PhD in 1968, with the thesis Sobre uma Extensão do Conceito de Compacidade e suas Aplicações, both supervised by Edison Farah. She became the second Brazilian woman to earn a mathematical doctoral's title from a Brazilian institution.

In these programs, Ofelia Alas noted that there were very few women present.

In 1968, Alas worked as an assistent professor at the University of São Paulo, but resigned for personal reasons. She've done researchers in France and Argentina. In 1975, she was rehired as temporary professor and, one year later, she was hired as a full time. Alas became the first associate woman professor. The second woman to obtain this title was Mary Lilian Lourenço, in 2000.

Between 1981 and 1983, she worked in a post-doc at the University of Toronto.

In 1990, Ofelia Alas was approved as full professor at the Institute of Mathematics and Statistics and retired in 1994, but continues to contribute as senior. Between 1990 and 1994, she served as vice-dean of IME-USP, working alongside dean Pedro Alberto Morettin.

She is a member of the Brazilian Mathematical Society, American Mathematical Society and the Academia de Ciências do Estado de São Paulo.

== Research ==
Alas is a researcher in topology and set theory's fields, with enphasis in collectionwise normal space.

Here is a small collection of Ofelia's works.

- 1964: On gauss spaces.
- 1970: Topological groups and the generalized continuum hypothesis.
- 1970: Une proposition équivalente au théorème de Zermelo.

== Personal life ==
Alas is a mother of two.
