= Carlos Alberto de Bragança Pereira =

Brazilian statistician (born 1946)

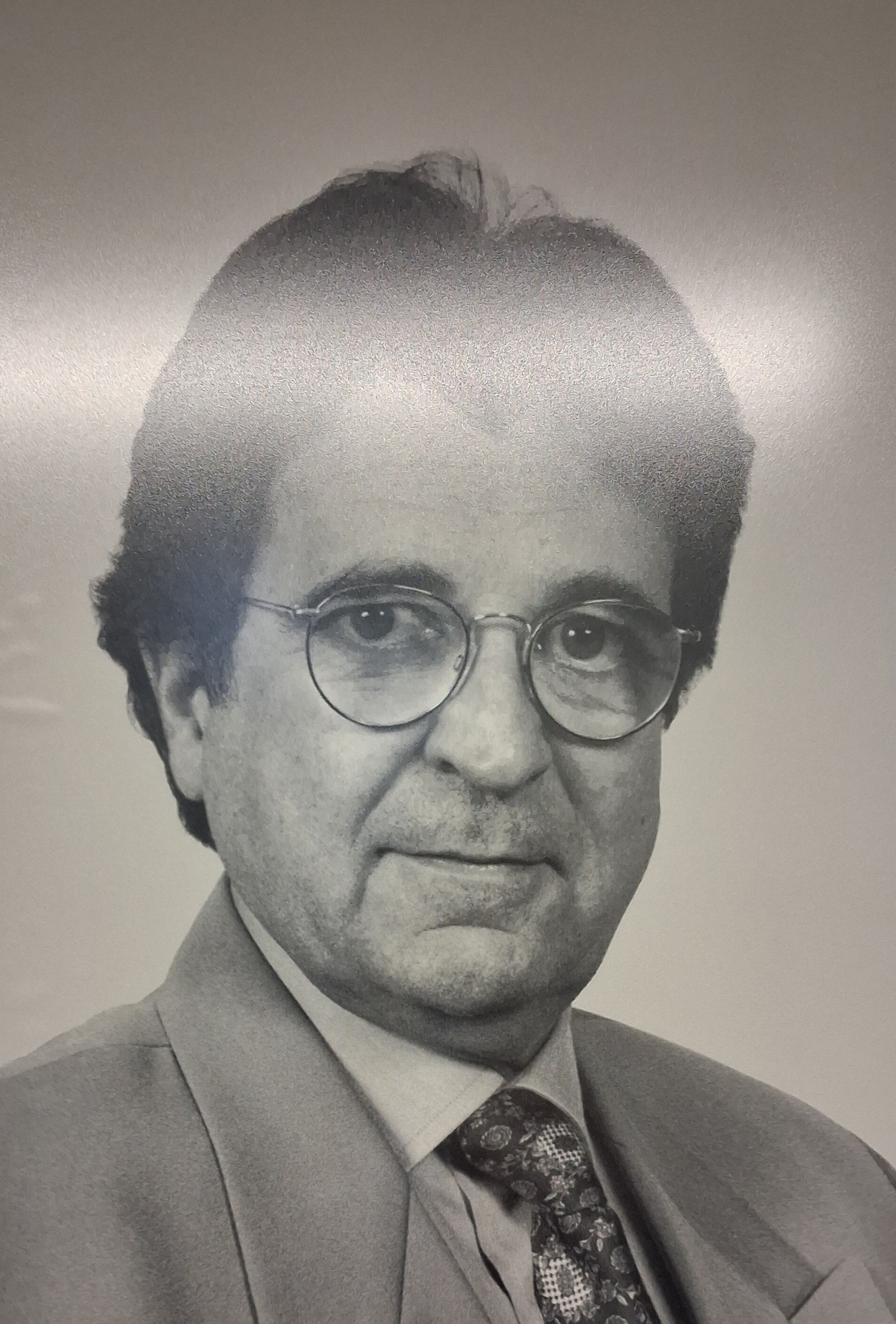
- Pereira at the IME-USP's hall of deans
- Born: July 1, 1946; Rio de Janeiro
- Citizenship: Brazilian
- Occupations: researcher, professor, statistician

Academic background
- Thesis: Bayesian Solutions to Some Classical Problems in Statistics (1980)
- Doctoral advisor: Debabrata Basu

Academic work
- Main interests: bayesian inference

Carlos Alberto de Bragança Pereira (born July 1, 1946) is a statistican and emeritus Brazilian professor of the Institute of Mathematics and Statistics of the University of São Paulo's Statistics Department. He searches in the fields of statistics, genetics and bioinformatics, specially in bayesian inference, where he became a pioneer in the global south.

Pereira, nicknamed as Carlinhos, is the first person with a master's degree in Statistics from the University of São Paulo. He had holded the position of the dean of the Institute between 1994 and 1998. Pereira holds a PhD from the Florida State University.

== Academic formation ==
Pereira graduated in Statistics from ENCE in 1968. Then, Carlos Alberto Barbosa Dantas invited him to a master's program at USP. On June 3, 1971, Bragança Pereira obtained his master's degree with the thesis Estimativa da probabilidade a priori em um problema de classificação.

This way, Carlos Pereira became the first master in Statistics from USP.

Dantas also encouraged him, as others IME-USP's professors, to obtain a PhD level in universities outside Brazil. So Pereira joined the Florida State University (FSU) in 1977. He defended his doctoral thesis Bayesian Solutions to Some Classical Problems in Statistics, supervised by Debabrata Basu, in 1980.

Later, he joined a post doctoral program at University of California, Berkeley from January 1986 to December 1987.

== Career ==
=== University of São Paulo ===
Carlos Alberto Barbosa Dantas presented the project of the Statistics Department of the Faculdade de Filosofia, Ciências e Letras, Universidade de São Paulo. With the support of the São Paulo Research Foundation, Carlos Alberto de Bragança Pereira was hired as a teaching assistant in 1969. Two years later, he began to work as an assistant professor at IME-USP.

Pereira achieved the full professor title in 1990, holding it until 2016, when he retired and received senior status.

During his career at IME-USP, he was the head of the Statistics Department three times and was the Institute's dean from 1994 to 1998, with Pablo Augusto Ferrari as his vice. On May 22, 2025, he received the emeritus title from the dean Ronaldo Fumio Hashimoto.

=== Associação Brasileira de Estatística ===
The Associação Brasileira de Estatística (ABE), created in 1984, has the goal of expand the viability and opportunities of the statistics in Brazil, promoting bulletins and organizing mettings. Pereir was its third president, serving from 1988 to 1990.

=== As translator ===
With Wagner de Souza Borges, Pereira translated the David Blackwell book Basic Statistics, which is considered by Carlinhos the most interest elementar book to discuss bayesian statistics.

=== Others ===
Pereira was a visitant researcher engineer at the University of California, Berkeley between 1986 and 1987 and a visitant teacher at the Federal University of Mato Grosso do Sul from 2018 to 2020.

He served as an observer to the Organization of American States in elections in countries like Nicaragua, El Salvador, Haiti and Paraguay. He was also Regional Director of The International Environmetrics Society.

He is member of the Conselho Científico da Associação Brasileira de Jurimetria and the Conselho Regional de Estatística da 3º Região (Conre3). Pereira is also a researcher in projects of São Paulo Research Foundation and consultant of the National Council for Scientific and Technological Development and Coordenação de Aperfeicoamento de Pessoal de Nível Superior.

== Researches ==
Pereira works in the fields of statistics, genetics, bioinformatics and medical statistics. He is pioneer of bayesian statistics is global South.

Even though he is an enthusiastic for this statistics, Debabrata "Dev" Basu, his teacher, made Pereira promise him to never become a bayesian statistics "preacher" and incetivated him to persuade applications of the concepts in different knowledge areas, because Basu believed that only the statistics who would found applicability to this area would be listened. Pereira also tries to pass this same message to his students.

With the Brazilian researcher Julio Michael Stern, he developed the concept of e-value, the epistemic value of hypothesis H given observations X. Also with Julio Stern, Pereira developed the Full Bayesian Significance Test, which is a measure of accuracy for hypotheses.

Pereira also made analysis of the elections system in 2016 and executed simulations and calculated the possible number of cases and deaths by COVID-19 during the pandemic in Brazil.

== Recognition and impact ==
In 1981, Pereira received the Ralph A. Bradley Student Award, which is presented to a doctoral student of the University of Florida. The student receives a sign with their name at the Frank Wilcoxon Memorial Reading Room.

The Brazil Top 10000 Scientists AD Scientific Index 2023, through criteria such as scientific performance and value to scientific production, ranked Carlos Pereira in the position 691 as Brazilian researcher and 212 as a University of São Paulo researcher in 2023. The Latin America Top 10000 Scientists AD Scientific Index 2023 ranked him in the position 206 among the USP researchers and holded the position 938 as a Latin American researcher.

Pereira hold the Emeritus title from the Institute of Mathematics and Statistics of the University of São Paulo. The ceremony was hold on 22 May 2025.

== Selected publications ==
- 1983: A Note on Blackwell Sufficiency and a Skibinsky Characterization of Distributions.
- 1988: Current status of cytogenetic procedures to detect and quantify previous exposures to radiation.
- 1999: Evidence and Credibility: Full Bayesian Significance Test for Precise Hypotheses.
- 2004: Assessment of anxiety and quality of life in fibromyalgia patients.
- 2006: Meta-analysis of femoropopliteal bypass grafts for lower extremity arterial insufficiency.
- 2006: Validation of the Brazilian version of the Fibromyalgia Impact Questionnaire (FIQ).
- 2019: Prevalence of low back pain in the elderly population: a systematic review.
