= Antonio Galves =

Brazilian mathematician (1947–2023)

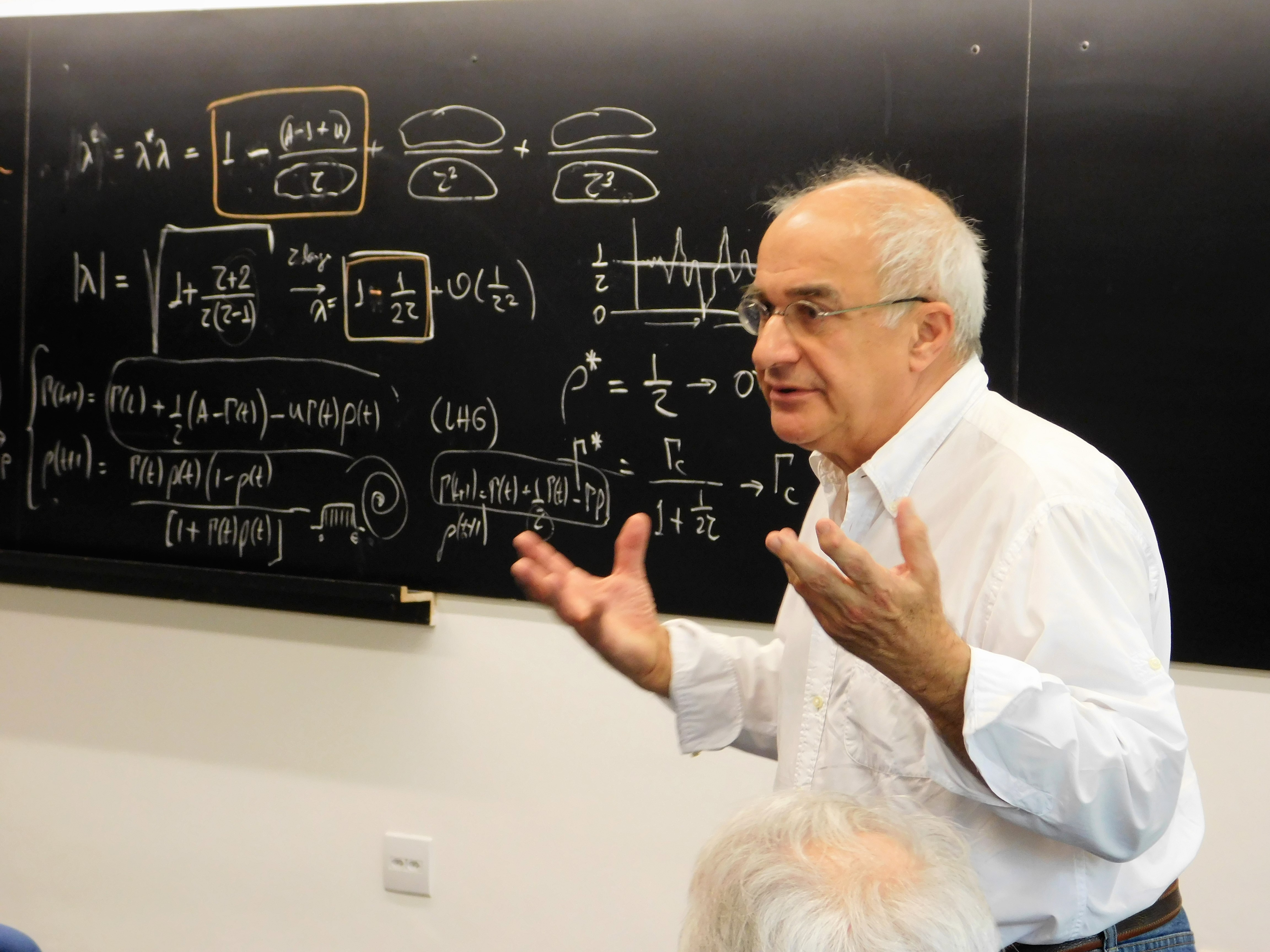
- Galves in 2017
- Born: Jefferson Antonio Galves; 18 June 1947; São Paulo, Brazil
- Died: 5 September 2023 (aged 76); Campinas, São Paulo, Brazil
- Education: University of São Paulo
- Occupation: Mathematician
- Employer: Institute of Mathematics, Statistics and Computer Science, University of São Paulo (1970–)
- Spouse: Charlotte Galves
- Awards: Grand Cross of the National Order of Scientific Merit (2007); habilitation (University of São Paulo, 1988); (Context Tree Selection and Linguistic Rhythm Retrieval from Written Texts, Florencia Leonardi, Charlotte Galves, Nancy L. Garcia, Sociedade Brasileira de Matemática Aplicada e Computacional, 2020); emeritus (University of São Paulo, Institute of Mathematics, Statistics and Computer Science, University of São Paulo, 2024)
- Scientific career
- Fields: Bioinformatics
- Workplaces: Institute of Mathematics, Statistics and Computer Science, University of São Paulo (1970–)
- Thesis: Sistemas Markovianos de partículas, associação e emparelhamento
- Doctoral advisor: Jacques Neveu, Carlos Alberto Barbosa Dantas

Jefferson Antonio Galves (18 June 1947 – 5 September 2023) was a Brazilian mathematician, professor of the Institute of Mathematics and Statistics of the University of São Paulo (USP) and member of the Brazilian Academy of Sciences. His field of studies was related to statistical models, in particular models that have stochasticity and variable range of memory. Galves was also the leader of NeuroMat, a research center established in 2013 at USP that is dedicated to integrating mathematical modeling and theoretical neuroscience.

== Personal life ==
Jefferson Antonio Galves was born in São Paulo, Brazil, on 18 June 1947. He was married to Charlotte Galves, and had two daughters and a son. He died in Campinas, São Paulo, on 5 September 2023, at the age of 76.

== Education and career ==
Galves studied for a Bachelors degree in Mathematics at USP in 1964–1968, followed by a Masters in Statistics in 1969–1972, also at USP, with advisor Carlos Alberto Barbosa Dantas. He studied for his PhD in Statistics at USP in 1972–1978, with the thesis Construção de um processo forte de Markov again advised by Carlos Dantas. this included studying for a specialised degree, Diplôme d'Estudes Approfondies, at Pierre and Marie Curie University in 1973–1974, with Jacques Neveu (with which he later established a cooperation program with USP and the University of Rome). He received habilitation from USP in 1988. He was a government employee in 1969–1970, before becoming a public servant in 1970, converting to a Professor of the Statistic Department of the Institute of Mathematics and Statistics in 1990.

He worked in the field of probability and statistics, on statistical models and stochastic systems, particularly Markov Particle Systems. He was a senior professor at the Institute of Mathematics and Statistics, University of São Paulo, where he coordinated NeuroMat (Research, Innovation, and Dissemination Center for Neuromathematics) and the Support Center for Research in Mathematics, Computing, Language and Brain (MaCLinC).

=== Awards, titles and recognition ===
He was a member of the Brazilian Academy of Sciences since March 5th, 1997. In October 10th, 2007 he received the Great Cross of the National Order of Scientific Merit. The 26th Brazilian School of Probability in 2023 was held in his honour. June 26th, 2024: the building where IME-USP's Núcleo de Apoio à Pesquisa em Modelagem Estocástica e Complexidade (NUMEC) held its activities was named as "Antonio Galves" building.

== Galves–Löcherbach model ==
Galves and Eva Löcherbach proposed the Galves–Löcherbach model in 2013. This is a model with intrinsic stochasticity for biological neural nets, in which the probability of a future spike depends on the evolution of the complete system since the last spike. This model of spiking neurons was developed by mathematicians Antonio Galves and Eva Löcherbach. In 2013 they called it a model of a "system with interacting stochastic chains with memory of variable length".

3D Vizualization of the Galves–Löcherbach model
