= Gauss Moutinho Cordeiro =

Brazilian statistician

Gauss Cordeiro
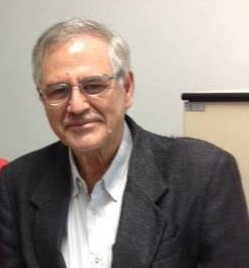
- Born: Gauss Moutinho Cordeiro; April 17, 1952 (age 74); Recife
- Education: UFPE; UFRJ; Imperial College London (PhD)
- Known for: Asymptotic Theory; Probability Distributions
- Scientific career
- Doctoral advisor: David Roxbee Cox; Peter McCullagh
- Website: research.com/u/gauss-m-cordeiro

Gauss Moutinho Cordeiro (born April 17, 1952) is a Brazilian engineer, mathematician and statistician who has made significant contributions to the theory of statistical inference, mainly through asymptotic theory and applied probability.

== Education ==
He received his PhD in statistics in January 1983 at Imperial College London supervised by David Roxbee Cox and Peter McCullagh.

== Research ==
Currently, Cordeiro is a Class A researcher of the Brazilian Research Council-CNPq, Full Professor at Federal University of Pernambuco (Brazil) and Member of the Graduate Program in Statistics at the same university. He has published more than 500 research articles in international scientific journals with referee practice (2025) and supervised more than 60 MSc dissertations and DSc theses. He was also president of the Associação Brasileira de Estatística, 2000–2002. He was one of the founder editors of the Brazilian Journal of Probability and Statistics and its Editor in Chief between 1995 and 2000. Cordeiro's main research interests in Statistics include Asymptotic Theory, Distribution Theory and Regression Models. He created, developed and organized several statistical meetings in Brazil and abroad. He has acted as referee for several important statistical journals. In 2010, Cordeiro awarded from the Brazilian Government the National Medal for Scientific Merit at the order of Comendador. He is a member of the Academy of Sciences of Pernambuco and Brazil. He has received Brazil Leader Award from research.com from 2022 to 2025. Link at https://research.com/u/gauss-m-cordeiro.

== Books ==
- An Introduction to Bartlett Correction and Bias Reduction. Printed by Springer Verlag, 2014.
- Modelos Lineares Generalizados (Generalized Linear Models). Printed by Regional Brasileira da Sociedade Internacional de Biometria (RBRAS), 2007.
- Modelos Paramétricos (Parametric Models). Printed by Associação Brasileira de Estatística (ABE), 2004.
- Introdução à Teoria Assintótica (Introduction to Asymptotic Theory). Printed by Associação Brasileira de Estatística (ABE), 1999.
- Introdução à Teoria de Verossimilhança (Introduction to Likelihood Theory). Printed by Associação Brasileira de Estatística (ABE), 1992.
- Modelos de Regressão para Análise de Dados Univariados (Regression Models for Analysis of Univariate Data). Printed by Sociedade Brasileira de Matemática (SBM), 1989.
- Modelos Lineares Generalizados (Generalized Linear Models). Printed by Associação Brasileira de Estatística (ABE), 1986.

== Personal life ==
He married in 1975 and has two daughters. His beloved son Lucas died on June 28, 2022.
