= NeuroMat =

Brazilian research institute

Research, Innovation and Dissemination Center for Neuromathematics
- Abbreviation: NeuroMat
- Formation: 2013
- Purpose: Integrate mathematical modeling and theoretical neuroscience
- Headquarters: University of São Paulo
- Location: Brazil
- Coordinates: 23°33′31″S 46°43′55″W
- Region served: Worldwide
- Leader: Prof. Antonio Galves
- Website: neuromat.numec.prp.usp.br/

The Research, Innovation, and Dissemination Center for Neuromathematics (RIDC NeuroMat, or simply NeuroMat) is a Brazilian research center established in 2013 at the Institute of Mathematics and Statistics in the University of São Paulo that is dedicated to integrating mathematical modeling and theoretical neuroscience. Among the core missions of NeuroMat are the creation of a new mathematical system to understanding neural data and the development of neuroscientific open-source computational tools, keeping an active role under the context of open knowledge, open science and scientific dissemination. The research center is headed by Antonio Galves, from USP's Institute of Mathematics and Statistics, and is funded by the São Paulo Research Foundation (FAPESP). As of 2019, the co-principal investigators are Oswaldo Baffa Filho (USP), Pablo A. Ferrari (USP/UBA), Fernando da Paixão (UNICAMP), Antonio Carlos Roque (USP), Jorge Stolfi (UNICAMP), and Cláudia D. Vargas (UFRJ). Ernst W. Hamburger (USP) was the former director of scientific dissemination. NeuroMat's International Advisory Board consists of David R. Brillinger (UC Berkeley), Leonardo G. Cohen (NIH), Markus Diesmann (Jülich), Francesco Guerra (La Sapienza), Wojciech Szpankowski (Purdue).

== Research ==
NeuroMat has been involved in the development of what has been called the Galves-Löcherbach model, a model with intrinsic stochasticity for biological neural nets, in which the probability of a future spike depends on the evolution of the complete system since the last spike. This model of spiking neurons was developed by mathematicians Antonio Galves and Eva Löcherbach. In the first article on the model, in 2013, they called it a model of a "system with interacting stochastic chains with memory of variable length.

== See also ==
Among the current large-scale international brain initiatives:

- Allen Institute – from the USA
- AusBrain – from Australia
- BRAIN Initiative – from the USA
- BRAINN - Brazilian Institute of Neuroscience and Neurotechnology – from Brazil
- Brain/MINDS – from Japan
- China Brain – from China
- Human Brain Project – from Europe
- IBT – Israel
- Korea Brain Research Institute – from the Republic of Korea
