= Chaim Samuel Hönig =

Brazilian mathematician (1926–2018)

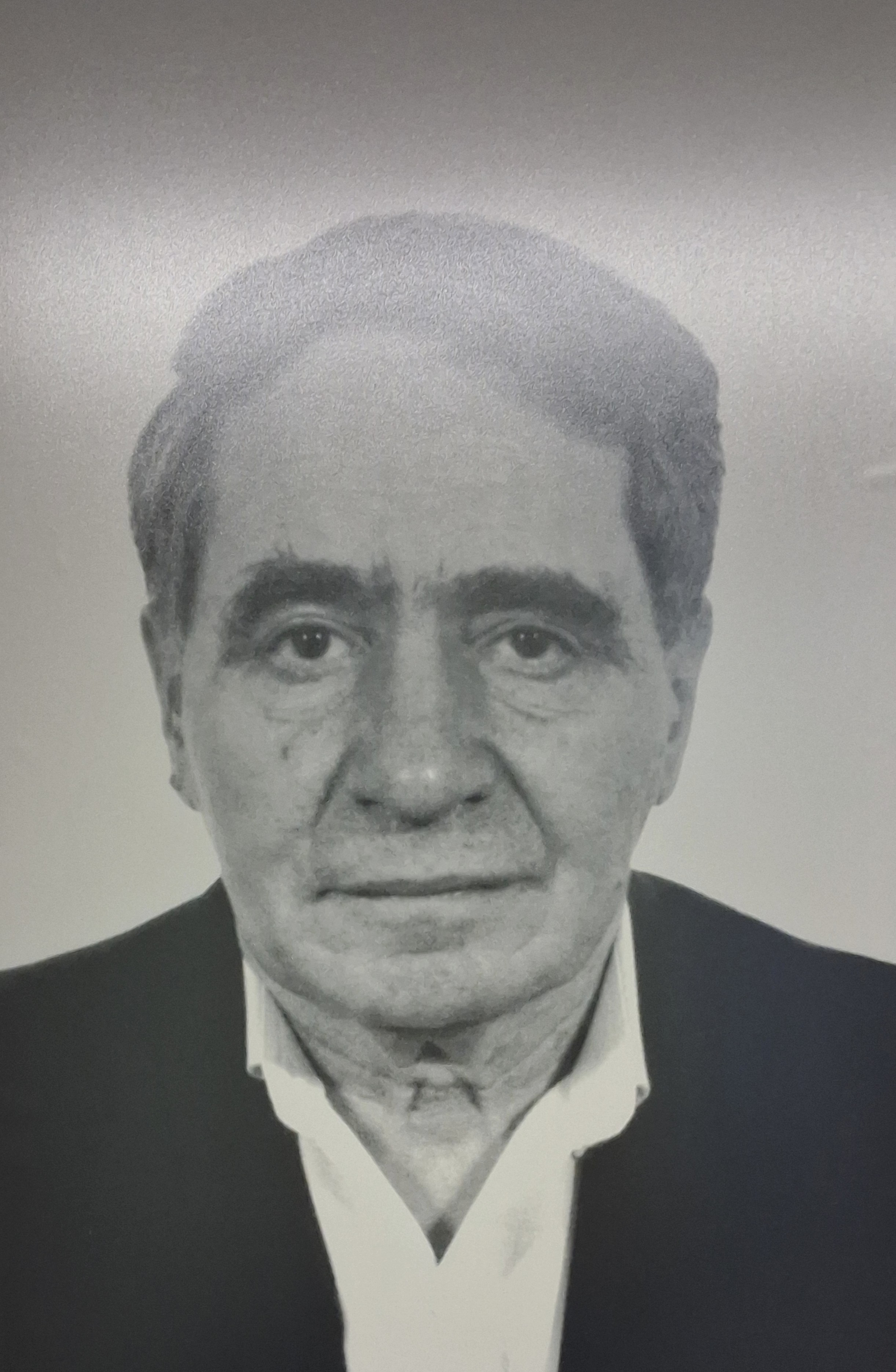
- Born: 1 February 1926; Berlin, Germany
- Died: 19 March 2018 (aged 92); São Paulo, Brazil
- Resting place: Cemiterio israelita, Embu das artes, Brazil
- Education: University of São Paulo
- Scientific career
- Fields: Mathematics
- Workplaces: Instituto de Matemática e Estatística
- Doctoral advisor: Edison Farah

Chaim Samuel Hönig (1 February 1926 – 19 March 2018) was a Brazilian mathematician. He was the main proposer of the Brazilian Mathematical Colloquium (1957), one of the founders of the Brazilian Mathematical Society (SBM), and its first president. Hönig was a full professor at the Institute of Mathematics and Statistics of the University of São Paulo and a member of the Brazilian Academy of Sciences. Hönig made relevant contributions to functional analysis.

== Books ==
- Análise funcional e aplicações, Volumes 1–2, Instituto de Matemática e Estatística, University of São Paulo, 1970
- Volterra–Stieltjes integral Equations: Functional Analytic Methods, Linear Constraints (Mathematics Studies), Elsevier, 1975
