= Pedro Alberto Morettin =

Brazilian statistician (born 1942)

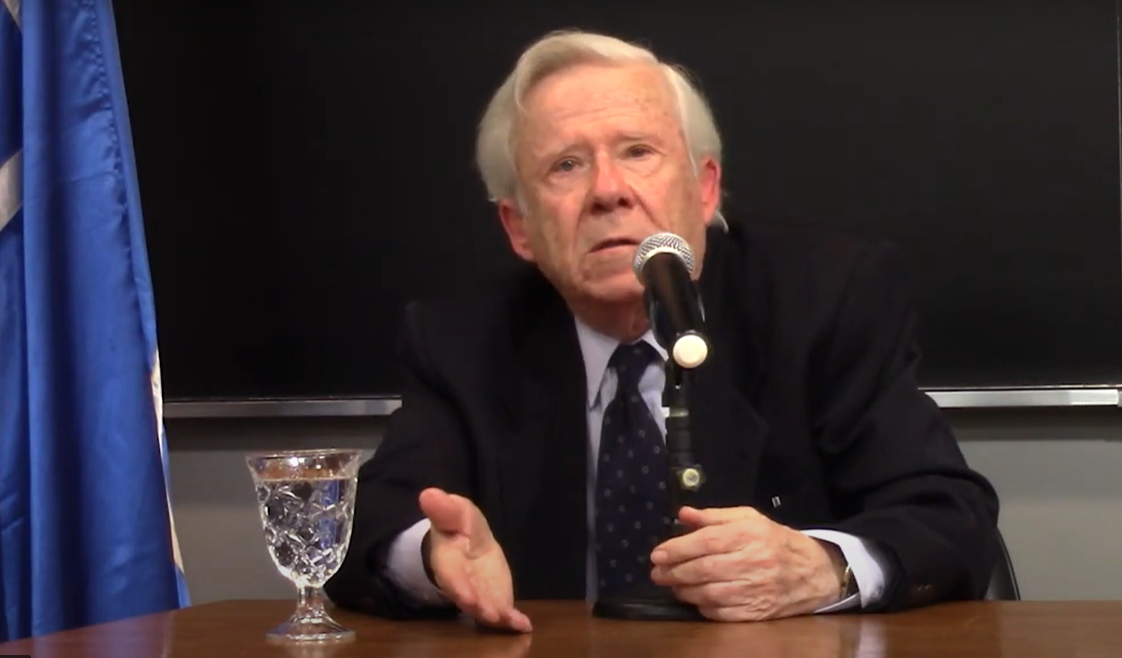
- Born: 1942; Catanduva
- Education: University of California, Berkeley
- Employer: University of São Paulo (1965–)
- Awards: emeritus (Institute of Mathematics, Statistics and Computer Science, University of São Paulo, 2024); ABE Award (2006)
- Scientific career
- Workplaces: University of São Paulo (1965–)
- Doctoral advisor: David R. Brillinger

Pedro Alberto Morettin (29 June 1942) is a Brazilian statistician, Emeritus professor at the Institute of Mathematics and Statistics, University of São Paulo and holds a PhD from the University of California, Berkeley. He also was involved with the Inter American Statistical Institute and the International Statistical Institute.

He is mostly recognized from his works in time series and wavelets analysis.

== Education ==
Morettin studied at the Instituto de Educação de Catanduva, where he had a math teacher who inspired him to persuade this career in this field. Later, Morettin enrolled in the University of São Paulo's mathematics program. In 1963, received both bachelor's and licentiate degree. After briefly working as a teacher, Morettin movet to the United States and begun to expand his knowledge of statistics.

He earned a master's degree in statistics in 1971 and his PhD in 1972, both from the University of California, Berkeley. There, he studied and became friend with David Brillinger, a friendship that lasted for 40 years. Morettin describes Brillinger's influence in his career as a researcher in the area of time series.

== Career ==
=== At the Institute of Mathematics and Statistics, University of São Paulo (IME-USP) ===
Although his initial degree was in pure mathematics, Morettin expanded his knowledge in statistics and began to teach in this field at the Institute of Mathematics and Statistics.

Morettin became the institute's dean in 1990. During his term, he modernized the Department of Statistics, introducing research areas in time series and wavelts and consolidate international partnerships. His warrant lasted until 1994, when Carlos Alberto de Bragança Pereira assumed.

Until 2012, he was Full Professor at the IME-USP. Later, in 2023, he received the Emeritus title, which is granted to retired teachers who stood out by their research and teaching activities and have distinguished themselves through contributions to the university. Morettin has built a career at IME-USP that spanned for almost six decades.

Currently, Morettin is IME-USP's Senior Professor and a associated editor of the Journal of Forecasting and São Paulo Journal of Mathematical Sciences.

=== Scientific associations ===
Morettin served as president of the Associação Brasileira de Estatística from 1994 to 1996 and as president of the Inter American Statistical Institute.

He is a National Council for Scientific and Technological Development Emeritus researcher and was a associated professor at the Centro de Estudos Quantitativos em Economia e Finanças.

Morettin held the position of the International Statistical Institute's vice-President and is still listed as a member.

== Legacy ==
Morettin worked extensively with time series, wavelets and statistics applications, with emphasis in its applications in finances, health and physics.

For his contribuitions in his area, Pedro Alberto Morettin became the first Brazilian to received the Mahalobis Award, granted by the Ministry of Statistics and Programme Implementation. The award is conceived since 2003 to a statistic originated in a developing country who promoted a research area.

In addition, Morettin has supervised 46 students in master's and doctoral's degree and has authored books that are widely used in basic courses and advanced ones.

== Awards and recognition ==
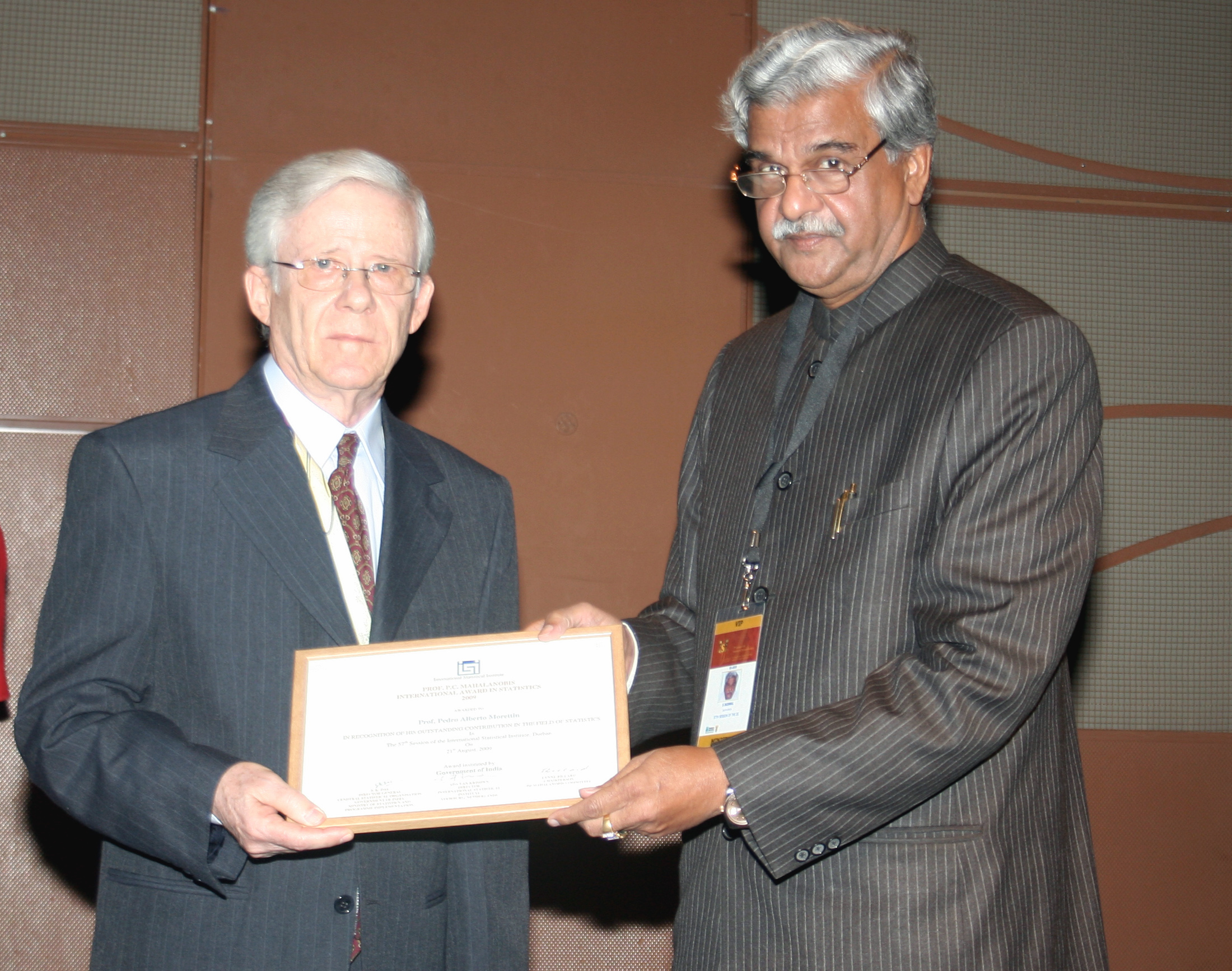
Morettin receiving the Mahalanobis Internacional Award.

- 2006: ABE Awards, from the Associação Brasileira de Estatística.
- 2009: Mahalanobis International Award, from the India Government.
- 2012: honored with a Workshop at Campinas.
- 2021: Conselho Federal de Estatística's Emeritus Statistic, from the Conselho Regional de Estatística 3ª Região (CONRE-3).
- 2023: Instituto de Matemática e Estatística da Universidade de São Paulo's Emeritus Professor, from IME-USP.
- 2024: Conselho Nacional de Desenvolvimento Científico e Tecnológico's Emeritus researcher, from the CNPq.
- 2024: the book Time Series and Wavelet Analysis: Festschrift in Honor of Pedro A. Morettin, that honors him, was published.

== Works ==
=== Books ===
- Morettin, P.A. (1997). Ondaletas e Seus Usos Na Estatistica. Sao Paulo: Associacao Brasileira de Estatistica. p. 90.
- 2014: Ondas e Ondaletas: da análise de Fourier à análise de ondaletas de séries temporais.
- Morettin, Pedro A. (2017-09-13). Econometria financeira: um curso em séries temporais financeiras (in Brazilian Portuguese). Editora Blucher. ISBN 978-85-212-1585-1.
- Morettin, Pedro A.; Bussab, Wilton O. (2017-10-06). ESTATÍSTICA BÁSICA (in Brazilian Portuguese). Editora Saraiva. ISBN 978-85-02-20717-2.
- Morettin, Pedro A.; Toloi, Clélia M. C. (2018-10-18). Análise de séries temporais: modelos lineares univariados (in Brazilian Portuguese). Editora Blucher. ISBN 978-85-212-1352-9.
- Morettin, Pedro A.; Toloi, Clélia M. C. Análise de Séries Temporais – Volume 2: Modelos multivariados e não lineares (in Brazilian Portuguese). Editora Blucher. ISBN 978-65-5506-006-5.
- 2022: Estatística e ciência de dados.

=== Articles ===
- 1974: Walsh-function analysis of a certain class of time series.
- 1984: The Levinson Algorithm and Its Applications in Time Series Analysis.
- Morettin, Pedro A. (1991). "Walsh-Fourier Analysis and Its Statistical Applications: Comment". Journal of the American Statistical Association. 86 (414): 482–483. doi:10.2307/2290598. ISSN 0162-1459. JSTOR 2290598.
- Mentz, Raul P.; Morettin, Pedro A.; Toloi, Clélia M.C. (1997). "Residual variance estimation in moving average models". Communications in Statistics - Theory and Methods. 26 (8): 1905–1923. doi:10.1080/03610929708832021. ISSN 0361-0926.
- Chiann, Chang; Morettin, Pedro A. (1998). "A wavelet analysis for time series". Journal of Nonparametric Statistics. 10 (1): 1–46. doi:10.1080/10485259808832752. ISSN 1048-5252.
- Zandonade, Eliana; Morettin, Pedro A. (2003). "Wavelets in state space models". Applied Stochastic Models in Business and Industry. 19 (3): 199–219. doi:10.1002/asmb.496. ISSN 1526-4025.
- Fujita, A.; Sato, J.R.; Garay-Malpartida, H.M.; Morettin, P.A.; Sogayar, M.C.; Ferreira, C.E. (2007-07-01). "Time-varying modeling of gene expression regulatory networks using the wavelet dynamic vector autoregressive method". Bioinformatics. 23 (13): 1623–1630. doi:10.1093/bioinformatics/btm151. ISSN 1367-4803. PMID 17463021.
- Sato, João R.; Morettin, Pedro A.; Arantes, Paula R.; Amaro, Edson (2007-08-15). "Wavelet based time-varying vector autoregressive modelling". Computational Statistics & Data Analysis. 51 (12): 5847–5866. doi:10.1016/j.csda.2006.10.027. ISSN 0167-9473.
- Porto, Rogério F.; Morettin, Pedro A.; Aubin, Elisete C. Q. (2008-11-01). "Wavelet regression with correlated errors on a piecewise Hölder class". Statistics & Probability Letters. 78 (16): 2739–2743. doi:10.1016/j.spl.2008.03.015. ISSN 0167-7152.
- Sato, João R.; Takahashi, Daniel Y.; Arcuri, Silvia M.; Sameshima, Koichi; Morettin, Pedro A.; Baccalá, Luiz A. (2009). "Frequency domain connectivity identification: An application of partial directed coherence in fMRI". Human Brain Mapping. 30 (2): 452–461. doi:10.1002/hbm.20513. ISSN 1065-9471. PMC 6871135. PMID 18064582.
- Bortoluzzo, Adriana B.; Morettin, Pedro A.; and Toloi, Clelia M.C. (2010-05-01). "Time-varying autoregressive conditional duration model". Journal of Applied Statistics. 37 (5): 847–864. Bibcode:2010JApSt..37..847B. doi:10.1080/02664760902914458. ISSN 0266-4763.
- Salcedo, Gladys E.; Porto, Rogério F.; Morettin, Pedro A. (2012-12-01). "Comparing non-stationary and irregularly spaced time series". Computational Statistics & Data Analysis. 56 (12): 3921–3934. doi:10.1016/j.csda.2012.05.022. ISSN 0167-9473.
