= Edison Farah =

Brazilian mathematician (1915–2006)

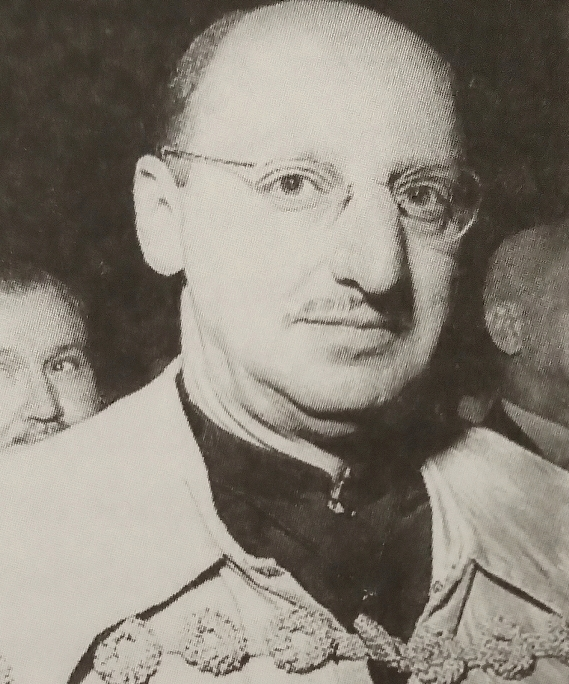
- Born: April 14, 1915; Capivari, São Paulo, Brazil
- Died: April 14, 2006 (aged 91); São Paulo, São Paulo, Brazil
- Education: University of São Paulo
- Organization(s): University of São Paulo and Pontifical Catholic University of São Paulo
- Known for: Pioneer mathematician in Brazil
- Notable work: "Sobre a Medida de Lebesgue (1950)"
- Spouse: Yvone Farah
- Parents: José Ignácio Farah (father); Eduarda Llamas (mother)

Edison Farah (Capivari, April 14, 1915 – São Paulo, April 14, 2006) was a Brazilian mathematician, professor at the University of São Paulo.

He was a founding member of the Mathematical Society of São Paulo, founded in 1945, and a full member of the Academy of Sciences of the State of São Paulo.

== Biography ==
Edison was born in the city of Capivari, in 1915. He was the eleventh child among the 12 children of José Ignácio Farah, a Lebanese immigrant from Baalbek, and Eduarda Llamas, a Spanish immigrant from Iznájar, in the province of Córdoba. The couple met on the ship that brought them to Brazil, which left Lebanon with a stopover in Spain. The name Edison, which was at odds with the Lebanese and Spanish names of their brothers, was in honor of the American inventor Thomas Edison.

Initially, the couple settled in the city of Capivari, then in Rio das Pedras and in Piracicaba. José Ignácio was a merchant and even had a store in Capivari, a cotton warehouse. Edison and his brothers used to play climbing the beams of the store's shed, where they would fall on the piles of stored cotton. It was while still a child that his taste for science began to blossom. He also made his own musical instruments, such as a bamboo flute. Music would be one of his lifelong interests.

The 1929 crisis shook the family business and so the older sons had to look for jobs to help with the household income. His brother Nacif graduated first in pharmacy at the Odontology and Pharmacy School of Ribeirão Preto and was a great incentive for Edison's career. After finishing his studies in Piracicaba, graduating in teaching, Edison began teaching mathematics, physics and music, as early as 1937, at the O Piracicabano Educational Institute. Edison was also a violinist with the Piracicaba Symphony Orchestra, having composed pieces for piano, violin and string quartet.

== Career ==
Among the teachers Edison had in high school was Professor Francisco Mariano da Costa, who taught mathematics and, noticing Edison's aptitude for mathematics, encouraged him to study mathematics in São Paulo. He participated in the admission contest of the University of São Paulo and obtained a degree in mathematics in 1941.

In 1942 he moved to the São Paulo capital, where he became assistant of the chair of Mathematical Analysis and then, in 1945, assistant of the chair of Superior Analysis, under the direction of Professor André Weil. In 1945 he married Yvone Farah, a German descendant, with whom he had three sons: Cláudio, Flavio (both architects) and Sergio (mechanical engineer).

In 1950, Edison obtained his doctorate in mathematics with the thesis Sobre a Medida de Lebesgue, under the guidance of Omar Catunda. In 1954 he was elevated to the title of full professor in Higher Analysis, where he published the paper "Algumas proposições equivalentes ao Axioma da Escolha", a pioneering work in Brazil in the area of the Axiomatic Set Theory.

He taught at the Pontifical Catholic University of São Paulo (PUC) from 1942 to 1954. From 1970, when the Institute of Mathematics and Statistics was created, Edison worked there for another ten years. He taught several specialized courses at the Institute of Mathematical Research and at the School of Philosophy, Sciences and Letters. His areas of expertise and interest were Set Theory, General Topology, Measurement and Integration Theory, and Functional Analysis.

He published about 20 articles in renowned journals in the field of mathematics and published three reference books. He advised several students at the University of São Paulo and at other universities in the country. One of his most notable mentors was the mathematician Newton da Costa. He played a fundamental role in the formation of groups dedicated to Logic and the Foundations of Mathematics at USP and the University of Campinas.

He retired from the University of São Paulo in 1980, and taught for a few more years at PUC, in São Paulo.

== Death ==
Edison died in the São Paulo capital on April 14, 2006, at the age of 91.

== See also ==
- University of São Paulo
- Pontifical Catholic University of São Paulo
- State University of Campinas
- Newton da Costa
- Chaim Samuel Hönig
- Lebesgue measure

== Bibliography ==
- Magalhães, Luiz Eduardo (2015). Humanistas e Cientistas do Brasil. São Paulo: Edusp. ISBN 9788531415296.
- Nobre, Sergio; Berato, Fábio; Saraiva, Luis (2011). Anais/Actas do 6o Encontro Luso-Brasileiro de História da Matemática. Natal: Sociedade Brasileira de História da Matemática. ISBN 978-85-89097-67-3.
- Trivizoli, Lucieli M. (2008). Sociedade de matemática de São Paulo: um estudo histórico-institucional (PDF) (Thesis). Universidade Estadual Paulista (UNESP).
