= Omar Catunda =

Brazilian mathematician (1913–1998)

- Born: September 23, 1906; Santos, São Paulo; Brazil
- Died: August 12, 1986 (aged 79); Salvador, Bahia; Brazil
- Education: Polytechnic School of the University of São Paulo
- Occupation: Mathematician

Omar Catunda (Santos, September 23, 1906 - Salvador, August 12, 1986) was a Brazilian mathematician, teacher and educator. He was one of the great mathematicians of the 20th century in Brazil and helped consolidate mathematics research and teaching.

== Biography ==
Catunda was born in 1906, in Santos, and was the tenth child of Thomaz Catunda and Maria Lima Verde Catunda, from Ceará. His father was a doctor and his mother was well educated, particularly interested in classical and romantic French literature. His paternal great-grandfather, Joaquim Catunda, was a Republican senator and a professor of German in Fortaleza.

Catunda studied at the Grupo Escolar Cesário Bastos, at the Liceu Comercial, where he excelled in Portuguese and Mathematics, and at the Escola de Comércio José Bonifácio. In 1922, he went to Rio de Janeiro, where he prepared for the exams at Colégio Pedro II by studying eleven hours a day, with the exception of Latin. Of the subjects studied, he enjoyed studying geometry the most, taking Comberrousse's Geometria Elementar as his textbook.

In 1925, he came first in the entrance exam for the Polytechnic School of the University of São Paulo, where he mastered spatial geometry. In the subject Complements of Mathematics, he had his first contact with Integral Differential Calculus and met Professor Theodoro Augusto Ramos, who later guided his higher studies in mathematics. He won the Cesário Motta Prize, a gold medal awarded to the best student in the first year of the course.

== Career ==
In 1930, Catunda graduated as an engineer; in 1933, he applied for the position of professor of Complementary Analytical Geometry, Nomography and Differential and Integral Calculus at USP's Polytechnic School, but was unsuccessful. In 1938, he worked as an engineer for Santos City Hall, but was hired by USP's Faculty of Philosophy, Sciences and Letters as an assistant to the Italian Luigi Fantappiè in the subject of Mathematical Analysis. From 1934 onwards, Catunda collaborated intensively with Fantappiè to establish the Mathematics Subsection of USP's Faculty of Philosophy, Sciences and Letters (the future Institute of Mathematics and Statistics).

Under Fantappié's guidance, he began studying the Theory of Analytic Functionals and, between 1938 and 1939, he undertook postgraduate studies on the subject at the University of Rome. The result of this trip was a paper entitled "Un teorema sugl'insiemi che si reconnette alla teoria dei funzionali analitici". After returning to Brazil, he was appointed interim professor of Mathematical and Higher Analysis, replacing Fantappiè, who had returned to Italy in 1939.

Catunda became a professor of Mathematical Analysis after defending his thesis "Sobre os fundamentos da teoria dos funcionais analíticos". He was appointed head of the Mathematics Subsection at USP's Faculty of Philosophy, Sciences and Letters, a position he held for many years. In 1942, he presented a paper entitled "Sobre os sistemas de equações de variações totais, em mais de um funcional incógnito". At the same time, Catunda expanded his studies and began to learn about topology using Pavel Alexandrov's text and algebra using Van der Waerden's text. Reflections of this appear in his thesis "Sobre os fundamentos da teoria dos funcionais analíticos", presented in 1944 for the Mathematical Analysis chair at the Faculty of Philosophy, Sciences and Letters.

In 1946, he obtained a scholarship from the Rockefeller Foundation and went to Princeton University, where he took courses with Emil Artin, N. Cramer, Heinz Hopf, Hermann Weyl and John von Neumann.

== Return to Brazil ==
In 1947, after finishing his studies at Princeton, Catunda returned to São Paulo, where he became involved in the campaign to defend Brazilian oil and became president of the Center for the Study and Defense of Oil. He was also a candidate for state representative, supported by the Communists, but his candidacy was contested by the electoral courts because he had not joined the Brazilian Communist Party. He criticized the Vargas administration for neglecting the education of the Brazilian people. According to Catunda, the government had decided to "democratize high school education, without realizing, or pretending not to realize, that there was no human material to carry out this democratization with the necessary severity". He also advocated increased investment in higher education courses, in order to train good teachers and improve high school education.

At the beginning of the 1960s, he was invited by the rector Edgard Santos to become director of the Institute of Mathematics and Physics at the Federal University of Bahia. After retiring as a professor at USP, he moved to Salvador, where he took office in September 1963, replacing Rubens Lintz. He worked as a professor and director of the Institute until 1969. After the 1968 university reform, he became a full professor and coordinator of the Master's program at the Institute of Mathematics and Statistics of the Federal University of Bahia, until his compulsory retirement in 1976.

Omar Catunda was one of the main representatives and promoters of the mathematical school established at the University of São Paulo by Fantappiè. He died on August 12, 1986, in Salvador, at the age of 79.

== Relevance ==
He made an important contribution to the modernization of the teaching of calculus and mathematical analysis at USP, UFBA and other universities through his book Curso de Análise Matemática, as there were practically no calculus or analysis textbooks in Portuguese at the time. His concern to update the many subsequent editions of the book has ensured that it is still used today.

Catunda was a professor to renowned physicists such as Mário Schenberg, Marcelo Damy, Abrahão de Moraes, Jean Meyer and Roberto Salmeron, and mathematicians such as Carlos Benjamin de Lyra, Luiz Henrique Jacy Monteiro and Alexandre Augusto Martins Rodrigues.

=== Main published works ===
Although he didn't publish many works, Catunda's material remains used to this day as a source of research on Fantappiè's theory of analytic functionals carried out in Brazil and published in specialized international journals.

- Un teorema sugl'insiemi che si reconnette alla teoria dei funzionali analitici (1939);
- Sui Sistemi di Equazioni alle Variazioni Totali in Più Funzionali Incogniti (1941).

==== Didactic works ====
- Ensino Atualizado da Matemática 2° Ciclo (1971);
- Curso de Análise Matemática I (1954).

== See also ==
- Cândido Lima da Silva Dias
