= Paulo Domingos Cordaro =

Professor and researcher from Brazil

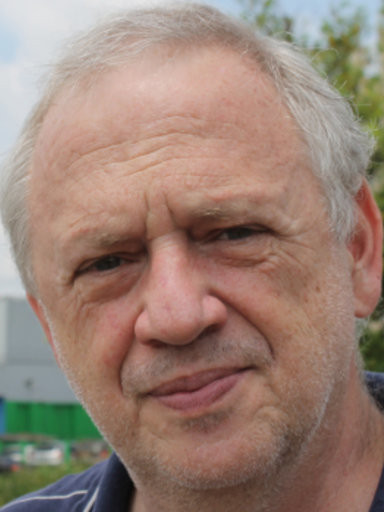
- Born: 8 June 1953
- Awards: National Order of Scientific Merit (1994–)
- Academic career
- Doctoral advisor: François Trèves

Paulo Domingos Cordaro (born 8 June 1953) is a Brazilian researcher, Brazilian Academy of Sciences and The World Academy of Sciences' member. He is full professor of the Institute of Mathematics and Statistics, University of São Paulo, where he served as director from 2006 to 2010. He also served as the Brazilian Mathematical Society's president.

Cordaro has been awarded the National Order of Scientific Merit.

== Early life ==
Cordaro was born in São Paulo, 1963, the son of Domingos Cordaro and Carlota Handro Cordaro.

== Academic career ==
Cordaro earned his degree in Applied Mathematics from IME-USP. He obtained his master's degree in mathematics at the same institution with his thesis Hipoelipticidade de uma classe de operadores diferenciais com características duplas, supervised by Antonio Gilioli.

In 1985, he completed his PhD at Rutgers University with the thesis On the range of the Lewy Complex, supervised by François Treves. Cordaro was also a visitant member at Princeton's Institute for Advanced study.

He has been a member of the Brazilian Academy of Sciences since 1998 and of The World Academy of Sciences since 2002, in the section Mathematical Sciences. Between 2003 and 2006, he served on the International Mathematical Union's Commission on Development and Exchanges.

Cordaro served as president of the Brazilian Mathematical Society from 1997 to 2001. He also was the dean of IME-USP between 2006 and 2010. Cordaro currently is a full professor in Department of Applied Mathematics.

== Recognition and impact ==
Cordaro was awarded with the National Order of Scientific Merit.

He had advised around 12 students in his life.

== Personal life ==
Cordaro is married to Lilian Marques.

== Selected publications ==
- 1993: Globally hypoelliptic systems of vector fields.
- 1994: Hyperfunctions on hypo-analytic manifolds.
- 1996: On local solvability of underdetermined systems of vector fields.
- 2004: Global solvability for a class of complex vector fields on the two-torus.
- 2008: An introduction to involutive structures.
