= Newton da Costa =

Brazilian philosopher and mathematician (1929–2024)

Newton Carneiro Affonso da Costa
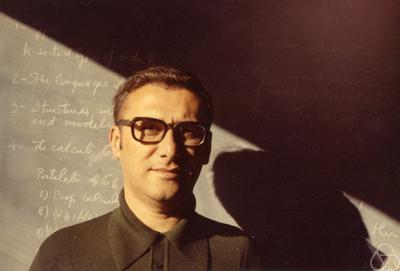
- Da Costa in 1973
- Born: 16 September 1929; Curitiba, Paraná, Brazil
- Died: 16 April 2024 (aged 94)
- Known for: Paraconsistent logic
- Scientific career
- Fields: Logic, Mathematics, Philosophy and Philosophy of Science
- Doctoral students: Jean-Yves Béziau; Marcelo Samuel Berman; Walter Carnielli; Itala D'Ottaviano

Newton Carneiro Affonso da Costa (16 September 1929 – 16 April 2024) was a Brazilian mathematician, logician, and philosopher, best known for establishing and pioneering the field of paraconsistent logic. Born in Curitiba, he studied engineering and mathematics at the Federal University of Paraná in Curitiba and the title of his 1961 Ph.D. dissertation was Topological spaces and continuous functions.

== Work ==
=== Paraconsistency ===
Da Costa's international recognition came mostly through his work on paraconsistent logic and its application to fields such as philosophy, law, computing, and artificial intelligence. He was one of the founders of this approach to non-classical logic. In addition, he constructed the theory of quasi-truth that constitutes a generalization of Alfred Tarski's theory of truth, and applied it to the foundations of science

=== Other fields; foundations of physics ===
The scope of his research also includes model theory, generalized Galois theory, axiomatic foundations of quantum theory and relativity, complexity theory, and abstract logics. Da Costa significantly contributed to the philosophy of logic, paraconsistent modal logics, ontology, and philosophy of science. He served as the President of the Brazilian Association of Logic and the Director of the Institute of Mathematics at the University of São Paulo. He received many awards and held numerous visiting scholarships at universities and centers of research in all continents.

Da Costa and physicist Francisco Antônio Dória axiomatized large portions of classical physics with the help of Patrick Suppes' predicates. They used that technique to show that for the axiomatized version of dynamical systems theory, chaotic properties of those systems are undecidable and Gödel-incomplete, that is, a sentence like X is chaotic is undecidable within that axiomatics. They later exhibited similar results for systems in other areas, such as mathematical economics.

Da Costa believed that the significant progress in the field of logic will give rise to new fundamental developments in computing and technology, especially in connection with non-classical logics and their applications.

=== Variable-binding term operators ===
Da Costa was co-discoverer of the truth-set principle and co-creator of the classical logic of variable-binding term operators—both with John Corcoran. He was also co-author with Chris Mortensen of the definitive pre-1980 history of variable-binding term operators in classical first-order logic.

=== P = NP ===
Together with Francisco Antônio Dória, Da Costa published two papers with conditional relative proofs of the consistency of P = NP with the usual set-theoretic Zermelo Fraenkel axioms (ZFC). The results they obtained are similar to the results of DeMillo and Lipton regarding the consistency of P = NP with fragments of arithmetic, and those of Sazonov and Maté regarding the conditional proofs of the consistency of P = NP with strong systems.

Basically da Costa and Doria define a formal sentence [P = NP]' which is the same as P = NP in the standard model for arithmetic; however, because [P = NP]' by its very definition includes a disjunct that is not refutable in ZFC, [P = NP]' is not refutable in ZFC, so ZFC + [P = NP]' is consistent (assuming that ZFC is). The paper then continues with an informal proof of the implication

If ZFC + [P = NP]' is consistent, then so is ZFC + [P = NP].

However, a review by Ralf Schindler points out that this last step is too short and contains a gap. A recently published (2006) clarification by the authors shows that their intent was to exhibit a conditional result that was dependent on what they call a "naïvely plausible condition". The 2003 conditional result can be reformulated, according to da Costa and Doria 2006, as

If ZFC + [P = NP]' is ω-consistent, then ZFC + [P = NP] is consistent.

So far, no formal argument has been constructed to show that ZFC + [P = NP]' is ω-consistent.

In his reviews for Mathematical Reviews of the da Costa/Doria papers on P=NP, logician Andreas Blass states that "the absence of rigor led to numerous errors (and ambiguities)"; he also rejects da Costa's "naïvely plausible condition", as this assumption is "based partly on the possible non-totality of [a certain function] F and partly on an axiom equivalent to the totality of F".

== Death ==
Da Costa died on 16 April 2024, at the age of 94.

== Selected publications ==
=== Articles and lectures ===
- N.C.A. da Costa, Sistemas Formais Inconsistentes. Curitiba, Brazil: Universidade Federal do Paraná, 1963.
- N.C.A. da Costa, Review of the article by Corcoran, Hatcher, and Herring on variable-binding term operators, Zentralblat fur Mathematik, vol. 247, pp. 8–9, 1973.
- N.C.A. da Costa, On the theory of inconsistent formal systems. Notre Dame Journal of Formal Logic 1974; 15: 497–510.
- N.C.A. da Costa (with L. Dubikajtis), On Jaskowski's Discussive Logic. Non-Classical Logics, Model Theory and Computability, North-Holland Publishing Company, Amsterdam, pp. 37–56, 1977.
- N.C.A. da Costa (with C. Mortensen), Notes on the theory of variable-binding term operators, History and Philosophy of Logic, vol.4, pp. 63–72, 1983.
- N.C.A. da Costa, Pragmatic probability. Erkenntnis 1986; 25: 141–162.
- N.C.A. da Costa (with Walter Carnielli), Paraconsistent deontic logics. Philosophia – The Philos. Quarterly of Israel, vol.16, numbers 3 and 4, pp. 293–305, 1988.
- N.C.A. da Costa (with V.S. Subrahmanian), Paraconsistent logic as a formalism for reasoning about inconsistent knowledge bases. Artificial Intelligence in Medicine 1989; 1: 167–174.
- N.C.A. da Costa (with F.A. Doria), Undecidability and incompleteness in classical mechanics, International J. Theoretical Physics, vol. 30 (1991), 1041–1073.
- N.C.A. da Costa, Paraconsistent logic. In Stanisław Jaškowski Memorial Symposium, pp. 29–35. Department of Logic, Nicholas Copernicus University of Toruń. 1998.
- N.C.A. da Costa (with O. Bueno and S. French), Is there a Zande Logic? History and Philosophy of Logic 1998; 19: 41–54.
- N.C.A. da Costa (with O. Bueno and A.G. Volkov), Outline of a paraconsistent category theory. In P Weingartner (ed.), Alternative Logics: Do Sciences Need them? Berlin: Springer-Verlag, 2004, pp. 95–114.

*N.C.A. da Costa (with F. A. Doria), Consequences of an exotic definition for P = NP. Applied Mathematics and Computation, vol. 145 (2003), 655–665, and Addendum to "Consequences of an exotic formulation for P=NP". Applied Mathematics and Computation, vol. 172 (2006), 1364–1367.

- N.C.A. da Costa (with F. A. Doria), Computing the future, in Computability, Complexity and Constructivity in Economic Analysis, ed. K. V. Velupillai, Blackwell, 2005.
- N.C.A. da Costa (with F. A. Doria), Some thoughts on hypercomputation, Applied Mathematics and Computation, vol. 178 (2006) 83–92.

=== Books ===
- N.C.A. da Costa, Lógica Indutiva e Probabilidade. Hucitec-EdUSP, 2a. ed., São Paulo, 1993.
- N.C.A. da Costa, Logique Classique et Non-Classique. Paris, Masson, 1997.
- N.C.A. da Costa, O conhecimento científico. São Paulo, Discurso Editorial, 2a. Ed., 1999.
- N.C.A. da Costa, J.M. Abe, J.I. da Silva Filho, A.C. Murolo and C.F.S. Leite Lógica Paraconsistente Applicada. São Paulo, Atlas, 1999.
- N.C.A. da Costa and S. French, Science and Partial Truth: A Unitary Approach to Models and Scientific Reasoning. (Oxford Studies in Philosophy of Science), Oxford University Press, 2003.
- Shyam Wuppuluri, N.C.A. da Costa (Eds.), "Wittgensteinian (adj.) : Looking at the World from the Viewpoint of Wittgenstein's Philosophy" Springer — The Frontiers Collection, 2019.

=== Essays on N. C. A. da Costa ===
- Nicola Grana, Sulla teoria delle valutazioni di N.C.A. da Costa. Naples: Liguori Editore, 1990. Pp. 75.

== See also ==
- Edison Farah
