= Itala D'Ottaviano =

Brazilian mathematical logician

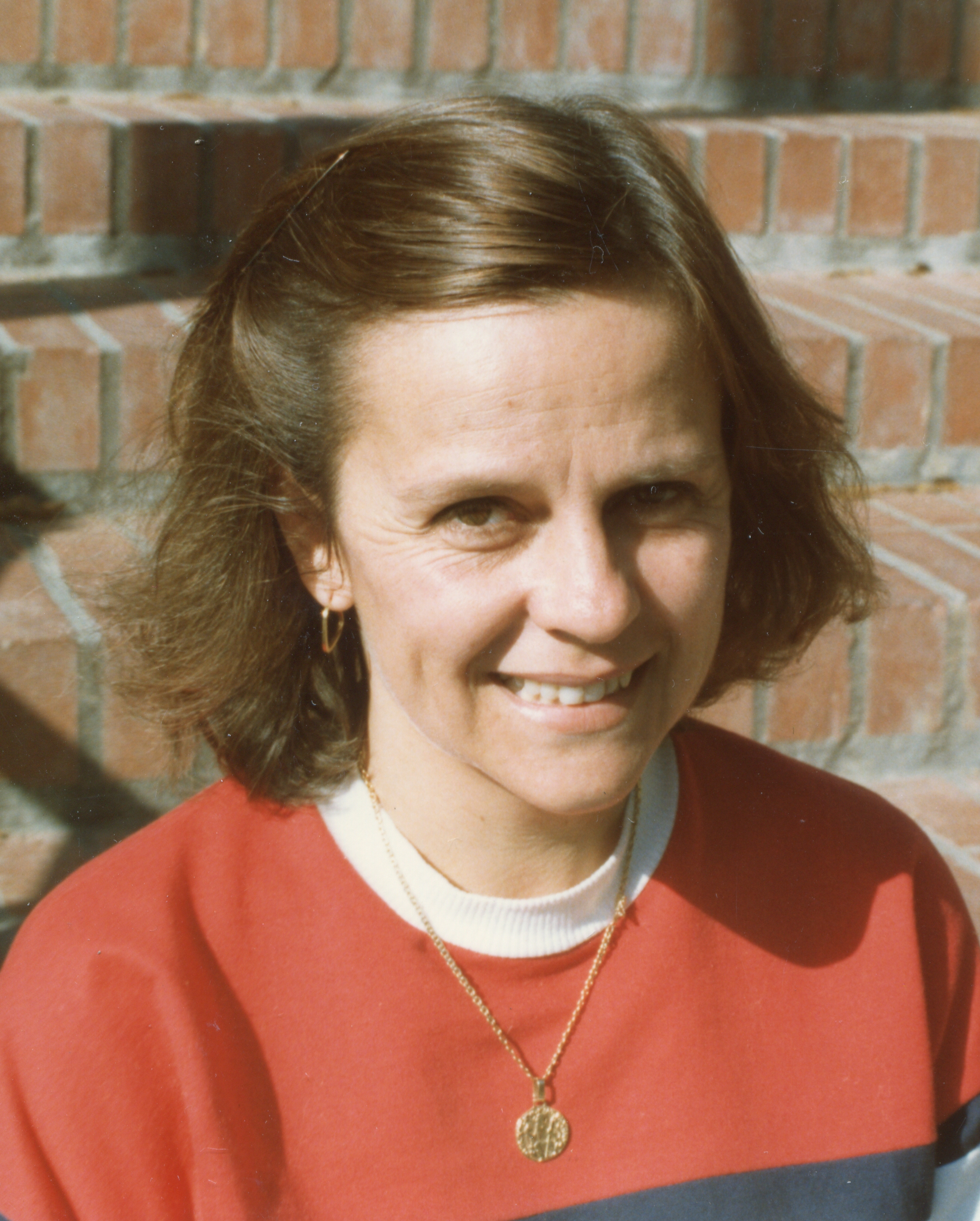
Berkeley, 1985

Itala Maria Loffredo D'Ottaviano (born 1944) is a Brazilian mathematical logician who was president of the Brazilian Logic Society. Topics in her work have included non-classical logic, paraconsistent logic, many-valued logic, and the history of logic.

== Education ==
After graduating from the Conservatório Musical Carlos Gomes, a music school in Campinas, in 1960, D'Ottaviano studied mathematics at the Pontifical Catholic University of Campinas, graduating in 1966. She earned a master's degree in mathematics at the University of Campinas in 1974, and completed a Ph.D. there in 1982, advised by Mário Tourasse Teixeira and Newton da Costa, respectively. Her doctoral dissertation, Sobre Uma Teoria de Modelos Trivalente, concerned the model theory of three-valued logic. She earned a habilitation at the University of Campinas in 1987.

== Career ==
D'Ottaviano was a postdoctoral researcher at the University of California, Stanford University, and the University of Oxford. She taught mathematics at the University of Campinas beginning in 1969, and became a titular professor there in 1998. From 2013 to 2014 she was Provost of Graduate Studies at the university.

She was president of the Brazilian Logic Society twice, from 1994 to 2003 and again from 2011 to 2014. She also headed the Committee on Logic in Latin America of the Association for Symbolic Logic from 1993 to 1999.

== Book ==
With Roberto Cignoli and Daniele Mundici, D'Ottaviano is a coauthor of the book Algebraic Foundations of Many-Valued Reasoning (Kluwer, 2000).

== Recognition ==
D'Ottaviano is a full member of the International Academy of Philosophy of Science.
