= Francisco Dória =

Brazilian scientist and philosopher

Francisco Doria
- Born: 1945 (age 80–81); Rio de Janeiro, Rio de Janeiro state, Brazil
- Education: Federal University of Rio de Janeiro (BA)

Francisco Antônio de Moraes Accioli Dória (born 1945) is a Brazilian mathematician, philosopher, and genealogist. Francisco Antônio Dória received his BS in Chemical Engineering from the Federal University of Rio de Janeiro (UFRJ), Brazil, in 1968 and then got his doctorate from the Brazilian Center for Research in Physics (CBPF), advised by Leopoldo Nachbin in 1977. Dória worked for a while at the Physics Institute of UFRJ, and then left to become a Professor of the Foundations of Communications at the School of Communications, also at UFRJ. Dória held visiting positions at the University of Rochester, Stanford University (here as a Senior Fulbright Scholar), and the University of São Paulo (USP). His most prolific period spawned from his collaboration with Newton Costa, a Brazilian logician and one of the founders of paraconsistent logic, which began in 1985. He is currently Professor of Communications, Emeritus, at UFRJ and a member of the Brazilian Academy of Philosophy.

His main achievement (with Brazilian logician and philosopher Newton da Costa) is the proof that chaos theory is undecidable (published in 1991), and when properly axiomatized within classical set theory, is incomplete in the sense of Gödel. The decision problem for chaotic dynamical systems had been formulated by mathematician Morris Hirsch.

More recently da Costa and Dória introduced a formalization for the P = NP hypothesis that they called the “exotic formalization,” and showed in a series of papers that axiomatic set theory together with exotic P = NP is consistent if set theory is consistent. They then prove:

If exotic P = NP together with axiomatic set theory is ω-consistent, then axiomatic set theory + P = NP is consistent.

(So far nobody has advanced a proof of the ω-consistency of set theory + exotic P = NP.) They also showed that the equivalence between exotic P = NP and the usual formalization for P = NP, is independent of set theory and holds of the standard integers. If set theory plus that equivalence condition has the same provably total recursive functions as plain set theory, then the consistency of P = NP with set theory follows.

Dória is also interested in the theories of hypercomputation and in the foundations of economic theory.

== Book List ==
- Francisco Antonio Doria, NCA da Costa, "On the Foundations of Science (LIVRO): Essays, First Series", Editora E-papers, 2013.
- Francisco Antonio Doria, "Chaos, Computers, Games and Time: A quarter century of joint work with Newton da Costa", Editora E-papers.
- Gregory Chaitin, Francisco A Doria, Newton C.A. da Costa, "Goedel's Way: Exploits into an undecidable world", CRC Press, 2011.
- Francisco Antonio Doria (Ed.), "The Limits Of Mathematical Modeling In The Social Sciences: The Significance Of Godel's Incompleteness Phenomenon", World Scientific, 2017.
- Shyam Wuppuluri, Francisco Antonio Doria (Eds.), "The Map and the Territory: Exploring the foundations of science, thought and reality", foreword by Sir Roger Penrose, Afterword by Dagfinn Follesdal, Springer — The frontiers Collection, 2018.
- Shyam Wuppuluri, Francisco Antonio Doria (Eds.), "Unravelling Complexity: The Life And Work Of Gregory Chaitin" World Scientific, 2020.
