= Sociedade Brasileira de Matemática Aplicada e Computacional =

Brazilian scientific society for applied mathematics

Brazilian Society of Computational and Applied Mathematics
- Sociedade Brasileira de Matemática Aplicada e Computacional
- Abbreviation: SBMAC
- Formation: 1 November 1978; 47 years ago
- Founded at: Belo Horizonte, Minas Gerais, Brazil
- Type: Nonprofit scientific society
- Headquarters: São Carlos, São Paulo, Brazil
- Region served: Brazil
- President: Maria Soledad Aronna (2026–2027)
- Affiliations: International Council for Industrial and Applied Mathematics
- Website: www.sbmac.org.br

The Brazilian Society of Computational and Applied Mathematics (Portuguese: Sociedade Brasileira de Matemática Aplicada e Computacional, SBMAC) is a Brazilian scientific society dedicated to the advancement of applied mathematics and computational mathematics. Established on 1 November 1978 in Belo Horizonte during the First National Symposium on Numerical Calculus, the society is headquartered in São Carlos, in the state of São Paulo.

The society organizes the annual National Congress of Computational and Applied Mathematics (CNMAC) and publishes the international journal Computational and Applied Mathematics, which has been in circulation since 1981. SBMAC is a full member of the International Council for Industrial and Applied Mathematics (ICIAM).

== History ==
SBMAC was established on 1 November 1978 at the First National Symposium on Numerical Calculus (Primeiro Simpósio Nacional de Cálculo Numérico), held at the Institute of Exact Sciences of the Federal University of Minas Gerais. During this meeting, a committee was appointed to organize the society's administration and draft its statute. Mathematician Eduardo Souza de Cursi, a founding member and later editor-in-chief of the society's journal, noted that the field represented by SBMAC was "something that lay between Mathematics, Computing and Engineering".

According to the society, its founding objectives included advancing the applications of mathematics in science, technology, and industry; encouraging effective mathematical methods and efficient use of computational resources; and fostering exchange among application fields. The society's mission is to promote the development and dissemination of applied and computational mathematics in Brazil.

Odelar Leite Linhares was the first president of SBMAC (1979–1981). He was succeeded by Marco Antonio Raupp, who led the society for three terms between 1981 and 1991 and later directed the National Laboratory for Scientific Computing (LNCC) and presided over the Brazilian Society for the Advancement of Science.. From 1999 to 2001, Maria Cristina de Castro Cunha of the State University of Campinas (Unicamp) became the first woman to preside over SBMAC. In 2022, the society launched the documentary series Memória SBMAC (SBMAC Memory), which features interviews with individuals involved in its history; the first episode highlighted Cunha.

== Organization ==
SBMAC is governed by an elected board serving two-year terms; the 2026–2027 board is chaired by Maria Soledad Aronna of the Fundação Getulio Vargas (FGV). The society maintains thematic committees, special commissions, and regional divisions, and holds reciprocity agreements with other scientific societies.

In 2019, SBMAC entered into a Latin American cooperation agreement with the applied mathematics societies of Argentina, Colombia, Ecuador, Paraguay, and Peru. The agreement was revised in 2025 to include Chile.

== Publications ==
- Computational and Applied Mathematics (CAM): the society's main journal, published since 1981. It is now published by Springer and indexed in Mathematical Reviews and the Web of Science.
- Trends in Computational and Applied Mathematics (TCAM): founded in 1999 as TEMA – Tendências em Matemática Aplicada e Computacional and renamed in 2021. It has been part of the SciELO collection since 2011.
- Notas em Matemática Aplicada (Notes in Applied Mathematics): a series of lecture notes and short-course texts, with more than one hundred volumes.
- The CNMAC proceedings (Proceedings Series of the Brazilian Society of Computational and Applied Mathematics), a book series published with Springer in the SpringerBriefs in Mathematics line, and the SBMAC Collection on Applied and Computational Mathematics.

== Events ==
=== CNMAC ===
The National Congress of Computational and Applied Mathematics (Congresso Nacional de Matemática Aplicada e Computacional, CNMAC) serves as the society's principal meeting. For more than four decades, the congress has been hosted in local academic communities; the local academic community elects the 2026 host city by proposal.

- The 44th CNMAC, held from 15 to 19 September 2025 at FGV's School of Applied Mathematics (FGV EMAp) in Rio de Janeiro, attracted approximately 550 participants and featured 346 papers across 14 technical sessions. The society described this event as the largest congress in the field in Brazil and Latin America.
- The 45th CNMAC was held from 14 to 18 September 2026 at the School of Science and Technology of São Paulo State University in Presidente Prudente. The congress invited five scientists working abroad, setting a new record for international participation. The opening plenary was delivered by Carol Woodward, then president of the Society for Industrial and Applied Mathematics (SIAM).

=== Regional meetings and LACIAM ===
The society also holds Regional Meetings of Computational and Applied Mathematics (ERMAC), aimed at researchers, teachers, and students in each region of Brazil.

Together with FGV EMAp, SBMAC organized the first Latin American Congress on Industrial and Applied Mathematics (LACIAM), held at the FGV Cultural Center in Rio de Janeiro from 30 January to 3 February 2023. According to ICIAM, the congress had 254 participants from 25 countries. The second LACIAM was held on 19–23 January 2026 at the Federico Santa María Technical University in Valparaíso, Chile.

== Prizes ==
SBMAC gives annual prizes for graduate work: the Marco Antônio Raupp Prize for the best doctoral thesis and the Clóvis Caesar Gonzaga Prize for the best master's dissertation. The Johannes Kepler Prize recognizes research articles and carries a diploma and R$10,000. Its fourth edition, in 2026, went to a paper on topology optimization that models layer-by-layer metal additive manufacturing, written by researchers from the University of São Paulo and Linköping University. The society also awards the Elon Lages Lima Prize for books by Brazilian authors, undergraduate research prizes, and academic merit awards.

== Presidents ==
Presidents of SBMAC
Term	President	Institution
1979–1981	Odelar Leite Linhares	
1981–1985	Marco Antonio Raupp	
1985–1987	Paulo Jorge S. Paes Leme	
1987–1989	Carlos Antônio de Moura	
1989–1991	Marco Antonio Raupp	
1991–1993	Julio Cesar Ruiz Claeyssen	
1993–1995	Ricardo Silva Kubrusly	
1995–1999	Martin Tygel	
1999–2001	Maria Cristina de Castro Cunha	Unicamp
2001–2005	Rubens Sampaio	
2005–2009	José Alberto Cuminato	USP
2009–2013	Geraldo Nunes Silva	
2014–2017	Antônio José da Silva Neto	UERJ
2018–2019	Carlile Lavor	Unicamp
2020–2023	Pablo M. Rodríguez	UFPE
2024–2025	Carlos Hoppen	UFRGS
2026–2027	Maria Soledad Aronna	FGV

== See also ==
- Brazilian Mathematical Society
- Society for Industrial and Applied Mathematics
- International Council for Industrial and Applied Mathematics
- List of mathematical societies
