= Elza Furtado Gomide =

Brazilian mathematician (1925–2013)

Elza Furtado Gomide

Elza Furtado Gomide (August 20, 1925 – October 26, 2013) was a Brazilian mathematician and the first woman to receive a doctorate in mathematics from the University of São Paulo, in 1950, and the second in Brazil. Gomide was involved in the creation of the Society of Mathematics of São Paulo and was elected head of the department of mathematics of the University of São Paulo in 1968.

== Biography ==
=== Family ===
Elza Gomide was the second child of Cândido Gonçalves Gomide and Sofia Furtado Gomide. Her older sister was Clotilde Isabel Furtado Gomide.

Her father studied engineering in France but worked as a mathematics teacher. Her mother studied piano in France and Switzerland and later became a piano teacher.

=== Early life ===
Elza Gomide was born and raised in a house on Rua Augusta. As her parents had French influence, she quickly learned to speak French. Her mother also taught her Portuguese, German, history and to play the piano, while her father taught mathematics, physics and chemistry.

== Career ==
Her first graduation was in physics at the University of São Paulo. Realizing she preferred mathematics, she became to act as assistant of the professor and mathematician Omar Catunda. Gomide graduated in mathematics after one year and begun her job as both teacher and researcher.

Elza Gomide became the second Brazilian woman to obtain the PhD title in a Brazilian institution and the first at USP.

== Death ==
Elza Furtado Gomide died in 2013.

== See also ==
- Marília Chaves Peixoto, another Brazilian mathematician who earned her doctorate in Brazil in 1948.
