= Cândido Lima da Silva Dias =

Brazilian mathematician (1913–1998)

- Born: December 31, 1913; Mococa, São Paulo; Brazil
- Died: September 15, 1998 (aged 84); São Paulo, São Paulo; Brazil
- Education: Faculty of Philosophy, Sciences and Letters of the University of São Paulo
- Occupation: Mathematician

Cândido Lima da Silva Dias (Mococa, December 31, 1913 – São Paulo, September 15, 1998) was a Brazilian mathematician and one of the first graduates in mathematics from the Faculty of Philosophy, Sciences and Letters of the University of São Paulo (FFCL). He was an important figure in the creation of the Institute of Mathematics and Statistics at the University of São Paulo.

== Biography ==
Cândido was born in 1913 in the city of Mococa. He was the son of Gabriel Antonio da Silva Dias, an electrical engineer who graduated from the Polytechnic School of the University of São Paulo in 1905, and Adília Lima da Silva Dias, a housewife. Encouraged by his father, Cândido began to learn and play with numbers, as well as arithmetic.

To continue his studies, he moved to São Paulo, where he studied at the Colégio Franco Brasileiro. He enrolled at the Polytechnic School in February 1932, where he graduated as a surveyor in 1934. In the same year, he entered the mathematics course at the Faculty of Philosophy, Sciences and Letters of the University of São Paulo. In 1937, Cândido married Odila Leite Ribeiro and had four children, all of whom became university professors.

== Career ==
After graduating in 1936, Cândido was appointed second scientific assistant to the Italian mathematician Luigi Fantappiè, a visiting professor at the University of São Paulo who was working on mathematical analysis. In 1937, he was promoted to first assistant, where he worked on theory and practice. Also in 1937, at a seminar, he was introduced to the theory of algebra developed by Gaetano Scorza, another Italian mathematician.

Between 1939 and 1941, he was responsible for the applied mathematics course. Throughout his career, he was a visiting researcher at Harvard and the University of Chicago, and in 1949 he was elected President of the Mathematical Society of São Paulo. He was crucial in founding the Institute of Mathematics and Statistics at the University of São Paulo, of which he was its first director, and the National Institute for Pure and Applied Mathematics.

== Retirement and death ==
Cândido retired from the University of São Paulo in 1978 and the following year became a professor at the Mathematics Institute of the Federal University of São Carlos, from where he retired in 1990. He died in the city of São Paulo on September 15, 1998, at the age of 84.

== See also ==
- Maria Laura Moura Mouzinho Leite Lopes
- Carlos Benjamin de Lyra
