= Brazilian Journal of Probability and Statistics =

- Discipline: Statistics
- Language: English
- Edited by: Fabio Machado, Rosangela Loschi and Mário de Castro

Publication details
- Former name: Revista Brasileira de Probabilidade e Estatística
- History: 1987–present
- Publisher: Brazilian Statistical Association (Brazil)
- Frequency: Quarterly
- Impact factor: 0.522 (2018)

Standard abbreviations
- ISO 4: Braz. J. Probab. Stat.

Indexing
- ISSN: (https://www.worldc at.org/search?fq=x0:jrnl&q=n2: 0103-0752) 0103-0752 (https://www.worldc at.org/search?fq=x0:jrnl&q=n2: 0103-0752)
- LCCN: (https://lccn.loc.go v/2010208818) 2010208818 (https://lccn.loc.go v/2010208818)
- OCLC no.: (https://www.worldca 45093452 (https://www.worldca

Links
- Journal homepage; [Journal homepage (https://imstat.org/journ als- and-publications/brazilian-journal-of-pro bability-and-statistics/) ]

The Brazilian Journal of Probability and Statistics (BJPS) is an official peer-reviewed scientific journal published by the Associação Brasileira de Estatística (Brazilian Statistical Association) with support from the Institute of Mathematical Statistics. The journal was established in 1987.

BJPS publishes papers in applied probability, applied statistics, computational statistics, mathematical statistics, probability theory and stochastic processes four times a year, in February, May, August, and December.

== Abstracting and indexing ==
The Brazilian Journal of Probability and Statistics is indexed in the Current Index to Statistics and Zentralblatt MATH.
