= Pablo Ferrari =

Argentine mathematician

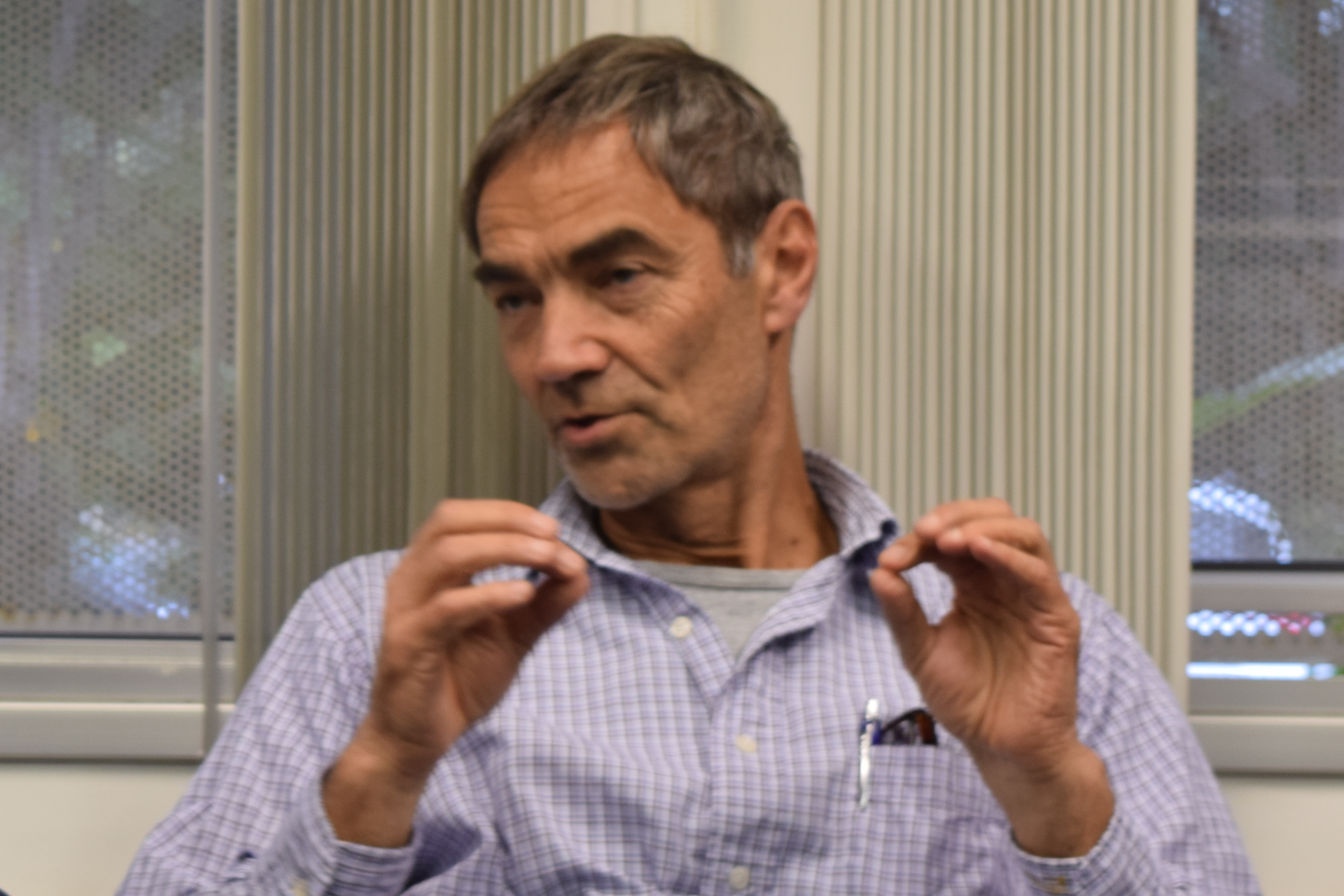
- Pablo Ferrari in 2013
- Born: Pablo Augusto Ferrari; September 11, 1949 (age 76)
- Education: University of Buenos Aires, University of Sao Paulo
- Awards: Consecration Award (2011)

Pablo Augusto Ferrari (September 11, 1949) is an Argentine mathematician, member of the Bernoulli Society, the Institute of Mathematical Statistics, the Brazilian Academy of Sciences, and the International Statistical Institute. He is also co-principal investigator at the Brazilian research center NeuroMat. Ferrari investigates probabilistic models of microscopic phenomena and macroscopic counterpart. He is the son of the contemporary conceptual artist León Ferrari.

== Biography ==
Pablo Ferrari was born in 1949 in Buenos Aires. He is the son of the contemporary conceptual artist León Ferrari with Alicia Barros Castro and has two sisters: Marialí and Ariel.

He got a degree in mathematics from the University of Buenos Aires (UBA) in 1974, PhD in Statistics from the University of Sao Paulo (USP) in 1982, with the dissertation Invariant measures for the marked simple exclusion process, advised by Enrique Daniel Andjel. He also has a postdoctoral from Rutgers.

Ferrari was Professor at the USP from 1978 to 2008 and was the vice Dean of the Institute of Mathematics and Statistics twice, one from 1994 to 1998 and the other from 1998 to 2002.

He was a visiting professor at Rutgers, Paris, Rome, Santiago de Chile and Cambridge. He is a UBA Professor and Researcher of CONICET from 2009 and a member of the Group Probability of Buenos Aires. He received a Guggenheim Fellowship in 1999, the Consecration Award of the Academy of Exact, Physical and Natural Sciences in Buenos Aires in 2011 and was named a fellow of the International Statistical Institute in 2013. Also, he is a honored member of the Institute of Mathematical Statistics.
