= Clelio Campolina Diniz =

Brazilian mechanical engineer

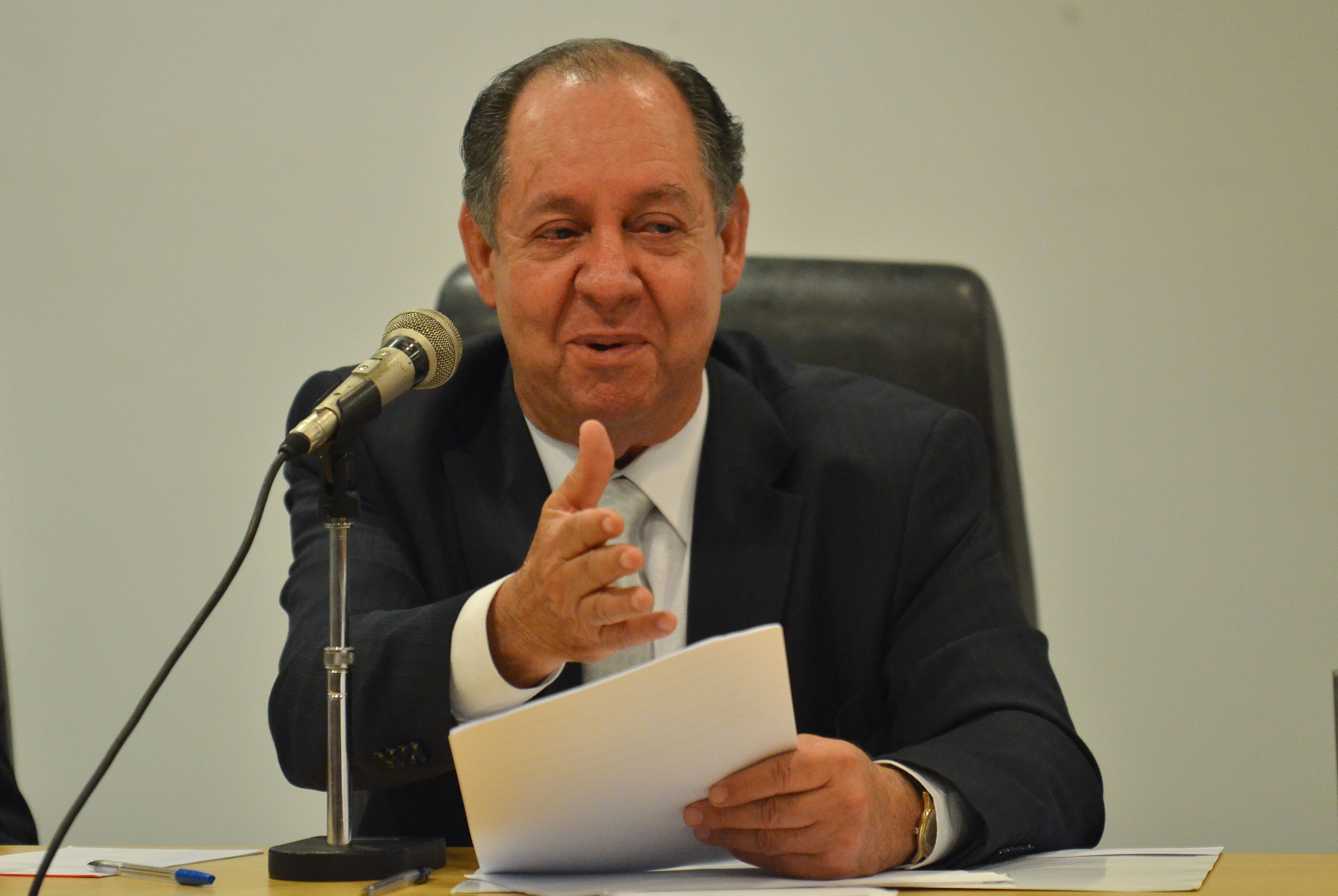

Minister of Science, Technology and Innovation
- In office 17 March 2014 – 1 January 2015
- President: Dilma Rousseff
- Preceded by: Marco Antonio Raupp
- Succeeded by: Aldo Rebelo

Rector of the Federal University of Minas Gerais
- In office 2010–2014

Personal details
- Born: 1942 (age 83–84) Esmeraldas, Minas Gerais, Brazil
- Education: Pontifical Catholic University of Minas Gerais; State University of Campinas; Rutgers University
- Occupation: Mechanical engineer, economist

Clelio Campolina Diniz (born 1942) is a Brazilian mechanical engineer. He served as minister of the Ministry of Science, Technology, and Innovation during Dilma Rousseff's (PT) administration.

== Biography ==
Clelio was born in the city of Esmeraldas, in the interior of the state of Minas Gerais. He moved to Belo Horizonte to study. He graduated from the Pontifical Catholic University of Minas Gerais (PUC MG) in 1967 with a degree in operations engineering and in 1970 with a degree in mechanical engineering.

He later moved to Campinas, where he earned a master’s degree in economics from the State University of Campinas (Unicamp). At the same institution, he also earned a Ph.D. in economics under the supervision of Wilson Cano. He completed a postdoctoral fellowship at Rutgers University in 1991. His studies focus on the field of regional economics. He also holds a specialization in Development and Planning from the Latin American Institute for Economic and Social Planning, which is a division of the United Nations Economic Commission for Latin America and the Caribbean (CEPAL).

He served as president of the Federal University of Minas Gerais (UFMG) from 2010 to 2014. He was invited by Dilma Rousseff to serve as Minister of Science and Technology on March 13, 2014, to replace Marco Antonio Raupp. During Dilma’s second term, Clelio was replaced by Aldo Rebelo (PCdoB).
