= Nuporanga =

- Municipality
- Flag Coat of arms

- Location in São Paulo state

- Location in Brazil
- Coordinates: 20°43′51″S 47°43′50″W
- Country: Brazil
- Region: Southeast
- State: São Paulo

Area
  - Total: 348 km^{2} (134 sq mi)

Population (2020)
  - Total: 7,478
  - Density: 21.5/km^{2} (55.7/sq mi)
- Time zone: UTC−3 (BRT)

Nuporanga is a municipality in the state of São Paulo in Brazil. The population is 7,478 (2020 est.) in an area of 348 km^{2}. The elevation is 775 m.

== See also ==
- List of municipalities in São Paulo
- Interior of São Paulo
