= Associação Brasileira de Estatística =

Brazilian statistical association

- Abbreviation: ABE
- Formation: 1984
- Headquarters: Institute of Mathematics and Statistics, University of São Paulo
- President: Flávio Augusto Ziegelmann
- Website: www.redeabe.org.br

The Brazilian Statistical Association (Portuguese: Associação Brasileira de Estatística (ABE)) is a non-profit organization with the purpose of promoting the development and application of statistical science. It also acts as a debating place for any professional body that has an interest in statistics. Its headquarters is at the Institute of Mathematics and Statistics, University of São Paulo.

ABE organizes the Simpósio Nacional de Probabilidade e Estatística (SINAPE), a symposium where statisticians from all over the country can debate the latest advances in probability theory and statistics.

ABE publishes the Brazilian Journal of Probability and Statistics. The journal is published four times per year.

== See also ==
- List of presidents of the Associação Brasileira de Estatística
