= Institute of Mathematics, Statistics and Computer Science, University of São Paulo =

Research center at the University of São Paulo

Institute of Mathematics and Statistics, USP
- Institute of Mathematics, Statistics and Computer Science, USP
- Other names: Institute of Mathematics and Statistics, USP; IME-USP
- Type: Public
- Established: 1964
- Parent institution: USP
- Dean: Sérgio Muniz Oliva Filho
- Academic staff: 185 faculty members and researchers (2018–2019)
- Students: 2,485
- Undergraduates: 1,616
- Postgraduates: 869
- Location: São Paulo, SP, Brazil
- Website: ime.usp.br

The Institute of Mathematics, Statistics, and Computer Science, formerly the Institute of Mathematics and Statistics (IME-USP), is a teaching and research center at the University of São Paulo. It is located at Cidade Universitária, São Paulo. The institute offers courses in mathematics, statistics and computer science.

== History ==
=== Background ===
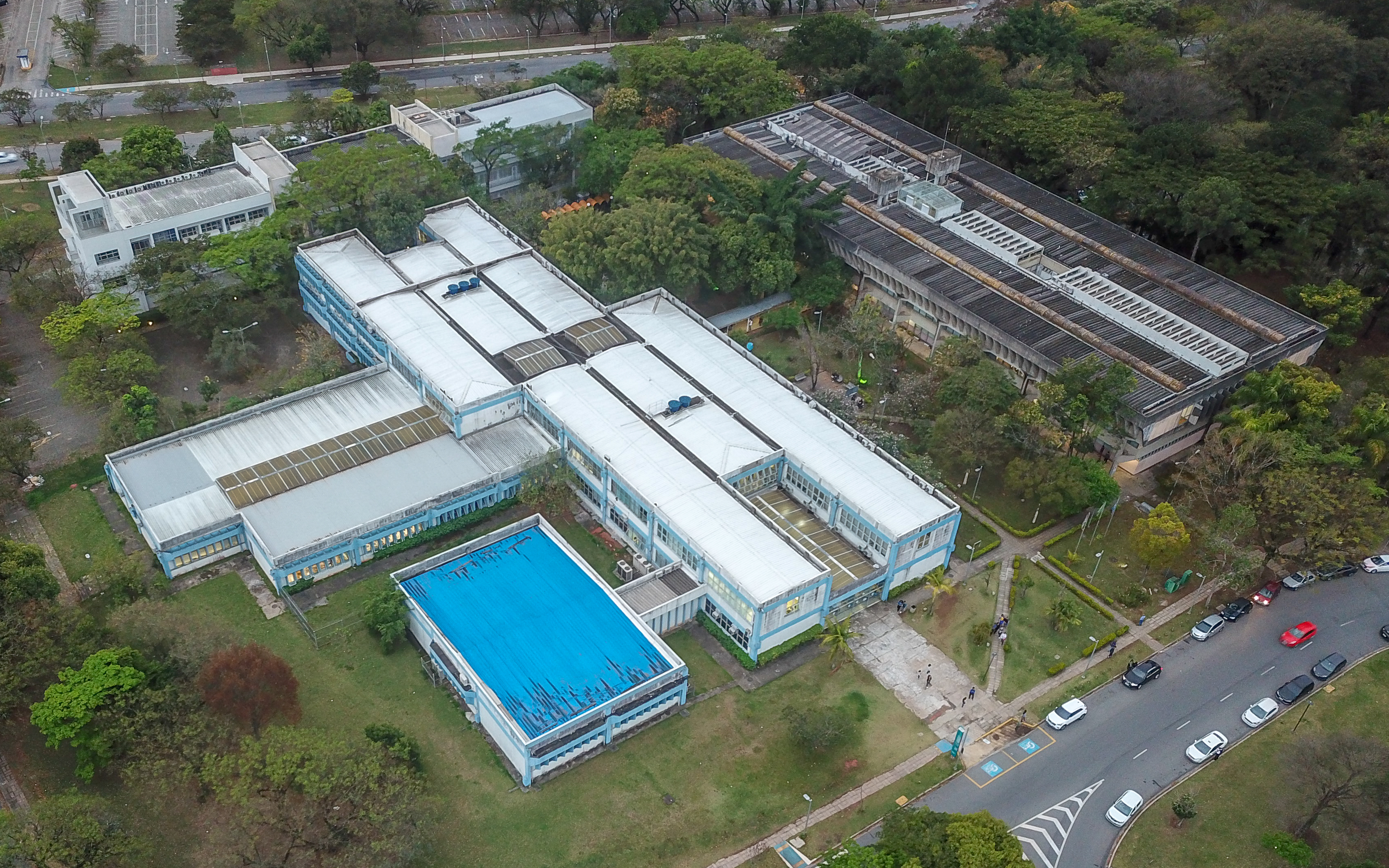
Aerial view of the institute

Prior to the founding of the IME in 1970, Mathematics studies took place mainly in the Polytechnic School, whose activities began in 1893, even before the foundation of USP. The University of São Paulo was created in 1934, from the junction of existing faculties and the creation of other units, such as the Faculty of Philosophy, Sciences and Letters (FFCL). The FFCL was responsible for teaching courses in all areas of knowledge, predominantly cultural or scientific, including the Mathematical Sciences course.

Formerly located at Alameda Glete, in 1949 the FFCL started to operate on the Maria Antonia Street campus. In the late 60's and early 70's, she was transferred to the Butantã campus and dismembered in several institutes, such as Psychology, Chemistry, Physics and Mathematics and Statistics.

=== Foundation ===
The creation of the IME took place on January 15, 1970, by the university reform, which brought together in a single institute the mathematics, statistics and computer science professors of the various establishments of USP, in particular those of the former Faculty of Philosophy, Sciences and Letters from the former Faculty of Economic and Administrative Sciences, Faculty of Hygiene and Public Health and the former Institute of Mathematical Research.

In honor of the Greek mathematician, physicist, engineer, inventor and astronomer, Archimedes (Greek: Ἀρχιμήδης; Siracusa, 287 BC – 212 BC), his image as a coat of arms of the Institute of Mathematics and Statistics of the University of São Paulo – USP).

=== New name ===
In late 2025, in recognition to the strong presence of the Computer Science area in the institute, IME-USP changed its name to Institue of Mathematics, Statistics and Computer Science.

== Rankings ==
It is considered, together with other units of USP that teach these courses, one of the two best institutes of mathematics, statistics and computation of Latin America according to the QS World University Rankings 2017; the best institute of mathematics of Brazil and the best institute of computation of Latin America according to the Ranking of Shanghai. As USP does not participate in the National Student Performance Examination (ENADE), the University of São Paulo's (RUF) 2017 University Ranking considers that the university is zero in this respect, which places the IME second in the ranking of courses in mathematics and computing. However, by disregarding this examination, USP would lead the ranking of these courses with a greater margin than the current leader.

== Departments and research areas ==
The smallest fraction of the structure of the university is the department. Its responsibility is to plan, execute and coordinate research and teaching in your area of expertise. It is responsible for the didactic orientation of the subjects.

=== Departments ===
- Department of Mathematics
- Department of Computer Science
- Department of Statistical Methods
- Department of Applied Mathematics

== Deans ==
Below, it's the list of the Deans and Vice Deans through the years.

Dean	Vice Dean	Department	Years
Cândido Lima da Silva Dias	Waldyr Muniz Oliva	Department of Mathematics	1970 - 1974
Waldyr Muniz Oliva	Chaim Samuel Hönig	Department of Applied Mathematics	1974 - 1978
Chaim Samuel Hönig	Cândido Lima da Silva Dias	Department of Mathematics	1978 - 1982
Carlos Alberto Barbosa Dantas	Chaim Samuel Hönig	Department of Statistical Methods	1982 - 1986
Chaim Samuel Hönig	Imre Simon	Department of Mathematics	1982 - 1986
Pedro Alberto Morettin	Ofelia Teresa Alas	Department of Statistical Methods	1990 - 1994
Carlos Alberto de Bragança Pereira	Pablo Augusto Ferrari	Department of Statistical Methods	1995 - 1998
Siang Wun Song	Pablo Augusto Ferrari	Department of Computer Science	1998 - 2002
Francisco César Polcino Milies	Paulo Domingos Cordaro	Department of Mathematics	2002 - 2006
Paulo Domingos Cordaro	Flávio Ulhoa Coelho	Department of Applied Mathematics	2006 - 2010
Flávio Ulhoa Coelho	Carlos Eduardo Ferreira	Department of Mathematics	2010 - 2014
Clodoaldo Grotta Ragazzo	Severino Toscano do Rego Melo	Department of Applied Mathematics	2014 - 2018
Junior Barrera	Luiz Renato Gonçalves Fontes	Department of Computer Science	2018 - 2022
Sergio Muniz Oliva Filho	Ronaldo Fumio Hashimoto	Department of Applied Mathematics	2022 - 2025

== Notable people ==
- César Lattes experimental physicist, one of the discoverers of the Pion.
- Chaim Samuel Hönig was the main instigator of the Brazilian Mathematical Colloquium in 1957, one of the founders of the Brazilian Mathematical Society (SBM).
- Elza Furtado Gomide was founder of the Society of Mathematics of São Paulo and was elected head of the department of mathematics of the University of São Paulo in 1968.
- Alexander Grothendieck was awarded the Fields Medal 1966.
- Fernando Q. Gouvêa won the Lester R. Ford Award of the Mathematical Association of America (MAA) in 1995.
- Yoshiharu Kohayakawa was awarded the Fulkerson Prize in 2018.
- Paolo Piccione is president of the Brazilian Mathematical Society since 2017.
- Pablo Ferrari is co-principal investigator at the Brazilian research center NeuroMat.
- Antonio Galves was also the head of NeuroMat.

== Publications ==
The journal São Paulo Journal of Mathematical Sciences is an official publication of the Institute of Mathematics and Statistics (IME) of the University of São Paulo (USP). It presents original and revision articles in the areas of Pure and Applied Mathematics, Statistics and Computer Science. Preceded by the journal Reviews of the Institute of Mathematics and Statistics of the University of São Paulo (1993-2005), the magazine assumed the current denomination in 2007 and, from 2015 onwards, it was published by Springer.
