= List of Brazilian mathematicians =

This list of Brazilian mathematicians includes the famous mathematicians from Brazil and also those who were born in other countries but later became Brazilians.

| Name | Image | Born | Died | Notes |
|---|---|---|---|---|
| Carolina Araujo | | 5 Sep 1976; Niterói | | The only tenured woman researcher at IMPA |
| Artur Ávila | | 29 Jun 1979; Rio de Janeiro | | Work on dynamical systems, Fields Medal winner |
| Manfredo do Carmo | | 15 Aug 1928; Maceió | 30 Apr 2018; Rio de Janeiro | Work on differential geometry, author of popular textbooks |
| Walter Carnielli | | 11 Jan 1952; Campinas | | |
| Gauss Moutinho Cordeiro | | 17 Apr 1952; Recife | | |
| Celso José da Costa | | 7 Apr 1949; Congonhinhas | | Discovered Costa's minimal surface |
| Newton da Costa | | 16 Sep 1929; Curitiba | 16 Apr 2024 | Logician |
| Ubiratàn D'Ambrosio | | 8 Dec 1932; São Paulo | 12 May 2021 | Popularized Ethnomathematics |
| César Camacho | | 15 Apr 1943; Lima | | |
| Marcos Dajczer | | 19 Nov 1948; Buenos Aires | | |
| Francisco Antônio Dória | | 1945; Rio de Janeiro | | |
| Djairo Guedes de Figueiredo | | 2 Apr 1934; Limoeiro do Norte | | Noted for his researches on differential equations |
| Leopoldo Penna Franca | | 7 Apr 1959; Rio de Janeiro | 19 Sep 2012; Rio de Janeiro | |
| Arnaldo Garcia | | 1950; Valença | | |
| Fernando Q. Gouvêa | | 13 Nov 1957; São Paulo | | MAA's Lester R. Ford Award winner |
| Alfredo Noel Iusem | | 10 Nov 1949; Buenos Aires | | |
| Yoshiharu Kohayakawa | | 27 Aug 1963; Marília | | |
| Elon Lages Lima | | 9 Jul 1929; Maceió | 7 May 2017; Rio de Janeiro | Topologist and geometer, teacher and author of textbooks |
| Artur Oscar Lopes | | 17 Oct 1950; Rio de Janeiro | | |
| Ricardo Mañé | | 14 Jan 1948; Montevideo | 9 Mar 1995; Montevideo | |
| Fernando Codá Marques | | 8 Oct 1979; São Carlos | | Work on differential geometry, co-author of the first proof of the Willmore conjecture |
| Carlos Matheus | | 1 May 1984, 1984; Aracaju | | |
| Júlio César de Mello e Souza | | 6 May 1895; Rio de Janeiro | 18 Jun 1974; Recife | The Malba Tahan |
| Welington de Melo | | 17 Nov 1946; Guapé | 21 Dec 2016; Rio de Janeiro | |
| Teixeira Mendes | | 5 Jan 1855; Caxias | 1927; Rio de Janeiro | |
| Carlos Gustavo Moreira | | 8 Feb 1973; Rio de Janeiro | | |
| Leopoldo Nachbin | | 7 Jan 1922; Recife | 3 Apr 1993; Rio de Janeiro | Introduced Nachbin's theorem and did important work on Hewitt–Nachbin spaces |
| Antonio Carbonari Netto | | | | |
| Helena J. Nussenzveig Lopes | | | | Known for her work on partial differential equations for fluid dynamics |
| Valeria de Paiva | | 13 Jun 1959; Pouso Alegre | | |
| Jacob Palis | | 15 Mar 1940; Uberaba | 7 May 2025; Rio de Janeiro | Work on dynamical systems, Balzan Prize winner |
| Maurício Matos Peixoto | | 15 Apr 1921; Fortaleza | 28 Apr 2019; Rio de Janeiro | Introduced Peixoto's theorem |
| Paulo Pinheiro | | 1967; Rio de Janeiro | | |
| Enrique Pujals | | 3 Jul 1967; Argentina | | |
| Paulo Ribenboim | | 13 Mar 1928; Recife | | |
| Ruy de Queiroz | | 11 Jan 1958; Recife | | |
| Aron Simis | | 20 Jun 1942; Recife | | |
| Imre Simon | | 14 Aug 1943; Budapest | 13 Aug 2009; São Paulo | |
| Joaquim Gomes de Souza | | 15 Feb 1829; Itapecuru Mirim | 1 Jun 1864; London | Pioneer in mathematical research in Brazil |
| Jorge Manuel Sotomayor Tello | | 25 Mar 1942; Lima | 7 Jan 2022; Rio de Janeiro | |
| Keti Tenenblat | | 27 Nov 1944; İzmir | | |
| Marcelo Viana | | 4 Mar 1962; Póvoa de Varzim | | |
| José Felipe Voloch | | 13 Feb 1963; Rio de Janeiro | | |

== See also ==
- List of mathematicians
- Science and technology in Brazil
