= List of Guggenheim Fellowships awarded in 1985 =

Two hundred and seventy scholars, artists, and scientists received Guggenheim Fellowships in 1985. $5,408,000 was disbursed between the recipients, who were chosen from an applicant pool of 3,548 and represented 99 different institutions. University of California, Berkeley had the most fellowship recipients awarded to its faculty (12), followed by Yale University (10) and Harvard University (9).

== 1985 United States and Canada fellows ==
Category	Field of Study	Fellow	Institutional association	Research topic	Notes	Ref
Creative Arts	Choreography	Pooh Kaye	Eccentric Motion	Choreography		
Creative Arts	Drama & Performance Art	Spalding Gray	Columbia University	Theater pieces		
Creative Arts	Drama & Performance Art	James Corbett Hamilton		Film script writing		
Creative Arts	Drama & Performance Art	Shirley Lauro		Research for a new play in England and Ireland		
Creative Arts	Drama & Performance Art	William Theodore Tally				
Creative Arts	Fiction	Charles Morley Baxter	Wayne State University	Broken Symmetry		
Creative Arts	Fiction	Louise Erdrich		Writing		
Creative Arts	Fiction	Stephen Goodwin	George Mason University	Writing		
Creative Arts	Fiction	Jamaica Kincaid		Writing		
Creative Arts	Fiction	Anne Lamott		Writing		
Creative Arts	Fiction	Toby Olson	Temple University	Utah (published 1987)		
Creative Arts	Fiction	Douglas Arthur Unger	Syracuse University	Fevertree		
Creative Arts	Fiction	Arturo Vivante	Bennington College	Writing		
Creative Arts	Fiction	John Williams	University of Denver	Writing		
Creative Arts	Fiction	William Wiser	University of Denver	Writing		
Creative Arts	Film	Jane Aaron		Filmmaking		
Creative Arts	Film	Tony Buba		The decline of mill communities around the country		
Creative Arts	Film	Lloyd Richard Ellison		Filmmaking		
Creative Arts	Film	Christopher C. McLeod		Filmmaking		
Creative Arts	Film	Sheldon S. Rochlin		Filmmaking		
Creative Arts	Fine Arts	James L. Adley	Michigan State University	Painting		
Creative Arts	Fine Arts	Luis Cruz Azaceta		Painting		
Creative Arts	Fine Arts	Robert Alan Bechtle	San Francisco State University and California College of Arts & Crafts	Painting		
Creative Arts	Fine Arts	Varujan Boghosian	Dartmouth University	Sculpture		
Creative Arts	Fine Arts	Power Boothe	School of Visual Arts	Painting		
Creative Arts	Fine Arts	Helene Brandt		Sculpture: Studied art in Japan		
Creative Arts	Fine Arts	Robert H. Colescott	College of San Francisco Art Institute	Painting and drawing		
Creative Arts	Fine Arts	Richard Culling		Painting		
Creative Arts	Fine Arts	Ron Fondaw	University of Miami	Ceramic sculpture		
Creative Arts	Fine Arts	Linda Francis	Pratt Institute (visiting)	Painting and drawing		
Creative Arts	Fine Arts	L. Brower Hatcher	Bennington College	Sculpture: Principle of Justice (1986) at the City of Roanoke Courthouse		
Creative Arts	Fine Arts	Candace Hill-Montgomery	School of Visual Arts	Visual art		
Creative Arts	Fine Arts	Harvey Quaytman		Painting	Also won in 1979	
Creative Arts	Fine Arts	Alfons J. Schilling		Visual art		
Creative Arts	Fine Arts	Mierle Laderman Ukeles		Visual art		
Creative Arts	Music Composition	David Chaitkin		Composing		
Creative Arts	Music Composition	Joseph Dubiel	Princeton University	Composing		
Creative Arts	Music Composition	George Edwards	Columbia University	Composing	Also won in 1980	
Creative Arts	Music Composition	Joel Feigin	Cornell University	Composed opera, The Mysteries of Eleusis		
Creative Arts	Music Composition	Lee Hyla		Composing		
Creative Arts	Music Composition	Steven Mackey	College of William and Mary	Composing		
Creative Arts	Music Composition	William Thomas McKinley	New England Conservatory	Composing		
Creative Arts	Music Composition	James Primosch	Columbia University	Composing		
Creative Arts	Photography	Ralph Gibson	School of Visual Arts	"Artifacts"		
Creative Arts	Photography	Jim Goldberg	University of Massachusetts, Boston	Social contrast and conflict		
Creative Arts	Photography	David T. Hanson	Rhode Island School of Design	Culture and landscapes of the American West		
Creative Arts	Photography	Robert Mahon				
Creative Arts	Photography	Antonio Mendoza		Start of his later project Stories		
Creative Arts	Photography	Judith Joy Ross	Moravian College	Portraits of prominent members of Congress		
Creative Arts	Photography	Jo Ann Walters	Yale University (visiting)	Photograping her hometown of Alton, Illinois		
Creative Arts	Poetry	Charles Bernstein		Writing		
Creative Arts	Poetry	William S. Di Piero	Stanford University	Writing		
Creative Arts	Poetry	Edward M. Hirsch	Wayne State University	Writing		
Creative Arts	Poetry	Jane B. Hirshfield		Writing		
Creative Arts	Poetry	Colette Inez	Columbia University	Writing		
Creative Arts	Poetry	Rodney Glenn Jones	Southern Illinois University-Carbondale	Writing his third book of poems		
Creative Arts	Poetry	Mary Kinzie	Northwestern University	Writing		
Creative Arts	Poetry	Jackson Mac Low		Writing		
Creative Arts	Poetry	Jay Meek	University of North Dakota	Poetry about family, commitment, and obligation		
Creative Arts	Poetry	Liam Rector		Writing		
Creative Arts	Poetry	Alan Richard Shapiro	Northwestern University	Writing		
Creative Arts	Poetry	John Joseph Wieners		Writing		
Creative Arts	Video & Audio	Tami Gold	New York University	The Forgotten Ones, a documentary about youth unemployment in New Jersey		
Creative Arts	Video & Audio	Mary Lucier		Wilderness (1986)		
Creative Arts	Video & Audio	Michael A. Smith				
Creative Arts	Video & Audio	Edin Velez				
Creative Arts	Video & Audio	Bill Viola				
Creative Arts	Video & Audio	Reynold Henry Weidenaar	New York University			
Humanities	American Literature	David Kalstone	Rutgers University	Edition of Elizabeth Bishop's letters		
Humanities	American Literature	Paul Mariani	University of Massachusetts, Amherst	Biography of John Berryman		
Humanities	American Literature	Ramón Saldívar	University of Texas	Nature of contemporary Chicano fiction and autobiography and the relation of those narratives to traditional American literature		
Humanities	American Literature	James L. W. West	Virginia Polytechnic Institute and State University	Relations between British and American publishing since 1850		
Humanities	Architecture, Planning, & Design	Richard A. Etlin	University of Maryland	Architecture, culture, and politics in Fascist Italy		
Humanities	Architecture, Planning, & Design	Charles B. McClendon	Yale University	Architectural contribution of the early Middle Ages		
Humanities	Architecture, Planning, & Design	Marvin Trachtenberg	New York University	Gothic architecture in Florence		
Humanities	Architecture, Planning, & Design	Anthony Vidler	Princeton University	Architecture of French Romanticism		
Humanities	Biography	Jean Strouse		J. Pierpont Morgan		
Humanities	British History	Stanford Eugene Lehmberg	University of Minnesota	Cathedrals in 16th-century English society	Also won in 1965	
Humanities	British History	Robert Michael Zaller	University of Miami	The Quest for Legitimacy in Revolutionary England, 1642-1660		
Humanities	Classics	James Tatum	Dartmouth University	Fiction and the reader in Greek biography		
Humanities	Dance Studies	Arlene Croce	The New Yorker	Examination of George Balanchine's artistic contributions	Also won in 1971	
Humanities	East Asian Studies	Jerry P. Dennerline	Amherst College	Social and cultural history of Wuxi County, China		
Humanities	East Asian Studies	David R. Knechtges	University of Washington	Translations of classical Chinese literary works		
Humanities	East Asian Studies	Leo Ou-fan Lee	University of Chicago			
Humanities	Economic History	Richard W. Unger	University of British Columbia	History of the Dutch brewing industry		
Humanities	English Literature	Gerald L. Bruns	University of Iowa	Practice of interpretation in early Judaism, Christianity, and Islam	Also won in 1974	
Humanities	English Literature	Joel Fineman	UC Berkeley	Shakespeare's treatment of character and its influence on later theories of person		
Humanities	English Literature	John Halperin	Vanderbilt University	Biographical essays on selected British, French, and American novelists	Also won in 1978	
Humanities	English Literature	Wendell V. Harris	Pennsylvania State University	Constructivist analysis of Victorian prose		
Humanities	English Literature	Richard Helgerson	UC Santa Barbara	William Shakespeare and the English Renaissance		
Humanities	English Literature	Alexander Leggatt	University of Toronto			
Humanities	English Literature	Lawrence Manley	Yale University	London and the urban vision of the English Renaissance		
Humanities	English Literature	Maximilllian E. Novak	UCLA			
Humanities	English Literature	Stephen M. Parrish	Cornell University	Art of Wordsworth's The Prelude		
Humanities	Fine Arts Research	James E. B. Breslin	UC Berkeley	Biography of Mark Rothko		
Humanities	Fine Arts Research	Ruth Butler	University of Massachusetts, Boston	Biography of Rodin		
Humanities	Fine Arts Research	John Coplans		Photography	Also won in 1969	
Humanities	Fine Arts Research	Elizabeth Johns	University of Maryland	American genre painting, 1825-1860		
Humanities	Fine Arts Research	Gerald Nordland		Richard Diebenkorn		
Humanities	Fine Arts Research	Richard A. Shiff	University of North Carolina, Chapel Hill	The "classic" in modern art		
Humanities	Folklore & Popular Culture	John F. Szwed	Yale University	Afro-American performance style		
Humanities	French Literature	Deirdre B. Bair	University of Pennsylvania	Critical biography of Simone de Beauvoir		
Humanities	French Literature	Marc Blanchard	UC Davis	Growth of Machiavellism in 16th-century Italy and France		
Humanities	French Literature	Robert Greer Cohn	Stanford University	A study of Mallarmé's Divagations	Also won in 1956	
Humanities	French Literature	Marcel Gutwirth	Haverford College	The theory of the comic and the art of comedy	Also won in 1971	
Humanities	French Literature	Barbara Ellen Johnson	Harvard University	Annotated translation and analyis of Mallarmé's prose		
Humanities	French Literature	David Warner Smith	University of Toronto	Critical edition of the correspondence of Helvétius		
Humanities	French Literature	Rosanna Warren	Boston University	Biography of Max Jacob (published 2020)		
Humanities	French History	Natalie Zemon Davis	Princeton University	Religion and society in 16th-century Lyon		
Humanities	French History	Steven L. Kaplan	Cornell University	End of guilds in 18th-century France		
Humanities	General Nonfiction	C. D. B. Bryan		Teenage suicide		
Humanities	General Nonfiction	Annie Dillard	Wesleyan University	Nonfiction narrative set in Pittsburgh		
Humanities	General Nonfiction	Noel Perrin	Dartmouth University	Social effects of robots	Also won in 1970	
Humanities	General Nonfiction	Richard Alan Selzer	Yale University School of Medicine	The art of medicine		
Humanities	General Nonfiction	Alex Shoumatoff		Cultural ecology in the tropics		
Humanities	German & Scandinavian Literature	Joel Agee		Translation of plays by Heinrich von Kleist		
Humanities	German & Scandinavian Literature	Barbara Becker-Cantarino	University of Texas	Role of women writers in German literature from the Reformation through the Romantic period		
Humanities	History of Science & Technology	Timothy Lenoir	University of Arizona	German science, 1850-1885		
Humanities	History of Science & Technology	Alan E. Shapiro	University of Minnesota	Edition of Newton's optical papers		
Humanities	History of Science & Technology	Arnold W. Thackray	University of Pennsylvania	History of the Center for Advanced Study in the Behavioral Sciences	Also won in 1971	
Humanities	History of Science & Technology	Gerald James Toomer	Brown University	An edition and translation of the Conics of Apollonius, books 5-7		
Humanities	Iberian & Latin American History	Richard R. Fagen	Stanford University	The Nicaraguan Revolution		
Humanities	Iberian & Latin American History	Frederick M. Nunn	Portland State University	Professional militarism in Latin America		
Humanities	Italian Literature	Giuseppe F. Mazzotta	Yale University	Classical myths and Christian ideas in Petrarch		
Humanities	Italian Literature	Rebecca J. West	University of Chicago	Contemporary Italian fiction		
Humanities	Latin American Literature	Gustavo Pérez-Firmat	Duke University	Cuban literary vernacular		
Humanities	Linguistics	András J. E. Bodrogligeti	UCLA	Chagatay language		
Humanities	Linguistics	Thomas Givón	University of Oregon	Pragmatics of human language		
Humanities	Linguistics	Paul J. Hopper	SUNY at Binghamton	Relationship between narrative discourse and linguistic form		
Humanities	Linguistics	Thomas E. Toon	University of Michigan	Literacy, politics, and language change in Alfred's England		
Humanities	Literary Criticism	Edwin M. Eigner	UC Riverside	History of the 19th-century English and American criticism of the novel		
Humanities	Literary Criticism	David G. Roskies	Jewish Theological Seminary of America	The art of modern Jewish storytelling		
Humanities	Medieval History	William M. Bowsky	UC Davis	The Florentine church in the age of Dante	Also won in 1963	
Humanities	Medieval History	Amos Funkenstein	UCLA	Theology and scientific imagination from the Middle Ages to the 17th century		
Humanities	Medieval History	Michael L. McCormick	Johns Hopkins University and Harvard University	Attitudes of Carolingian nobility toward the Byzantine civilization		
Humanities	Medieval Literature	Roberta Frank	University of Toronto	Politics of Germanic legend in Anglo-Saxon England		
Humanities	Medieval Literature	Joseph C. Harris	Cornell University	Generic history of Old English and Old Norse heroic elegies		
Humanities	Medieval Literature	Anne L. Middleton	UC Berkeley	Speculative lives and the subject of Piers Plowman		
Humanities	Music Research	Cynthia Adams Hoover	National Museum of American History	Piano in America		
Humanities	Music Research	George B. Stauffer	Hunter College, Graduate Center, CUNY, and Columbia University	Tempos in the keyboard works of Bach		
Humanities	Near Eastern Studies	Gösta Werner Ahlström	University of Chicago			
Humanities	Near Eastern Studies	Nina G. Garsoïan	Columbia University	The cultural frontier between classical civilization and the pre-Islamic East		
Humanities	Near Eastern Studies	Margaret Cool Root	University of Michigan	Seal impressions on the Persepolis fortification tablets		
Humanities	Near Eastern Studies	Piotr Steinkeller	Harvard University			
Humanities	Philosophy	Henry E. Allison	UC San Diego			
Humanities	Philosophy	Hubert L. Dreyfus	UC Berkeley	Heidegger's later writings		
Humanities	Philosophy	Barbara Herman	University of Southern California			
Humanities	Philosophy	Donald H. Regan	University of Michigan	Priority of the good in ethics and politics		
Humanities	Photography Studies	Ulrich F. Keller	UC Santa Barbara	Reconstruction of Nadar's Figures Contemporaines series		
Humanities	Religion	John H. Hick	Claremont Graduate University	Interpretation of religion	Also won in 1963	
Humanities	Renaissance History	John Michael Najemy	Cornell University	Guild community in republican Florence		
Humanities	Russian History	Daniel H. Kaiser	Grinnell College	Marriage and the family in the early modern Soviet Union		
Humanities	Russian History	Alexander Vucinich	University of Pennsylvania	Science and Soviet ideology	Also won in 1974	
Humanities	Science Writing	Martin Jay Sherwin	Tufts University	Biography of J. Robert Oppenheimer		
Humanities	South Asian Studies	John S. Hawley	University of Washington and Columbia University	Translation of the Sur Sagar		
Humanities	Spanish & Portuguese Literature	Michael Ugarte	University of Missouri, Columbia	How the exile experience affects the literature and the language of people who were forced from their country, specifically pre-World War II Spain		
Humanities	Theatre Arts	William R. Alexander	University of Michigan	Pedagogy and art in contemporary American theatre, film, video, and education		
Humanities	Theatre Arts	Julian Beck	The Living Theater	Philosophy and metaphysics of the theater		
Humanities	Theatre Arts	Errol Gaston Hill	Dartmouth University	History of Afro-American drama and theater in the US		
Humanities	Theatre Arts	Judith Malina	The Living Theater	Second volume of The Diaries of Judith Malina		
Humanities	Theatre Arts	Bonnie Marranca	PAJ	Theatricalization of American culture		
Humanities	United States History	Thomas J. Archdeacon	University of Wisconsin-Madison	Biography of Alfred E. Smith		
Humanities	United States History	Richard Van Wyck Buel Jr.	Wesleyan University	Naval warfare and the American Revolution economy		
Humanities	United States History	Thomas R. Cripps	Morgan State University	Black film history		
Humanities	United States History	Robert Dawidoff	Claremont Graduate School	Modern interpretations of American civilization		
Humanities	United States History	David H. Donald	Harvard University	Biography of Thomas Wolfe	Also won in 1964	
Humanities	United States History	Jordan A. Schwarz	Northern Illinois University	Political history of 20th-century American inflation		
Natural Sciences	Applied Mathematics	Nathaniel J. Fisch	Princeton University	Transport in driven systems		
Natural Sciences	Applied Mathematics	J. William Helton Jr.	UC San Diego	Functional analysis in electrical engineering		
Natural Sciences	Applied Mathematics	Janos Kirz	SUNY at Stony Brook	X-ray holography		
Natural Sciences	Applied Mathematics	George H. Miley	University of Illinois	Approaches to advanced fuel fusion		
Natural Sciences	Applied Mathematics	Ka-Kit Tung	Massachusetts Institute of Technology	Atmospheric waves		
Natural Sciences	Astronomy-Astrophysics	Eric Edward Becklin	University of Hawaii	Analysis of data recently collected by an infrared astronomy satellite; also, looking for new sources of radiation		
Natural Sciences	Astronomy-Astrophysics	Icko Iben Jr.	University of Illinois			
Natural Sciences	Astronomy-Astrophysics	Philipp P. Kronberg	University of Toronto	Magnetic field strengths of distant galaxies		
Natural Sciences	Astronomy-Astrophysics	Frederick K. Lamb	University of Illinois	Theoretical astrophysics		
Natural Sciences	Chemistry	Howard Alper	University of Ottawa	Organometallic phase-transfer catalysis		
Natural Sciences	Chemistry	Malcolm Harold Chisholm	Indiana University	Organometallic cluster chemistry		
Natural Sciences	Chemistry	James P. Collman	Stanford University	Molecular engineering of novel materials	Also won in 1977	
Natural Sciences	Chemistry	William E. Hatfield	University of North Carolina, Chapel Hill	Electronic structure of magnetically coupled materials		
Natural Sciences	Chemistry	Jack H. Lunsford	Texas A&M University			
Natural Sciences	Chemistry	William J. MacKnight	University of Massachusetts, Amherst	Scattering studies of polymer blends and ion-containing polymers		
Natural Sciences	Chemistry	Janet Gretchen Osteryoung	California Institute of Technology (visiting)	Fundamental properties of solid electrodes		
Natural Sciences	Chemistry	Merle D. Pattengill	University of Kentucky	Reaction dynamics		
Natural Sciences	Chemistry	David Wixon Pratt	University of Pittsburgh	Patterns of energy levels and spectra for polyatomic molecules		
Natural Sciences	Chemistry	Julius Rebek Jr.	University of Pittsburgh	Ion transport		
Natural Sciences	Chemistry	Gary B. Schuster	University of Illinois	Organometallic photochemistry		
Natural Sciences	Chemistry	Amos B. Smith III	University of Pennsylvania	Chemical communication in primates		
Natural Sciences	Computer Science	Richard E. Ladner	University of Washington	Theory of distributed computing, and computer science education for the Deaf		
Natural Sciences	Computer Science	Leslie G. Valiant	Harvard University	Complexity of machine learning		
Natural Sciences	Earth Science	B. Clark Burchfiel	Massachusetts Institute of Technology	Evolution of the alpide collisional mountain belt of the Southern Balkans		
Natural Sciences	Earth Science	Daniel C. Fisher	University of Michigan			
Natural Sciences	Engineering	C. Barry Carter	Cornell University	High-resolution studies of phase boundaries in ceramic oxides		
Natural Sciences	Engineering	William G. Oldham	UC Berkeley	Models of manufacturing technology for integrated circuits		
Natural Sciences	Mathematics	Yum-Tong Siu	Harvard University	Complex differential geometry		
Natural Sciences	Mathematics	Alan David Weinstein	UC Berkeley	Hamiltonian systems and nonlinear wave equations		
Natural Sciences	Mathematics	Andrew John Wiles	Princeton University	Number theory		
Natural Sciences	Medicine & Health	Paul Bornstein	University of Washington	The part genes may play in regulating collagen production		
Natural Sciences	Medicine & Health	M. Eric Gershwin	UC Davis	Production of autoantibodies in New Zealand mice		
Natural Sciences	Medicine & Health	Daniel Porte Jr.	University of Washington	How the body uses insulin as a messenger to tell when it's time to quit eating		
Natural Sciences	Molecular & Cellular Biology	Struther Arnott	Purdue University	The language of DNA and RNA structures		
Natural Sciences	Molecular & Cellular Biology	Thomas R. Cech	University of Colorado, Boulder	Mechanism of RNA self-splicing		
Natural Sciences	Molecular & Cellular Biology	Antony R. Crofts	University of Illinois	Mechanism of electron transfer in photosynthesis		
Natural Sciences	Molecular & Cellular Biology	W. Ford Doolittle	Dalhousie University			
Natural Sciences	Molecular & Cellular Biology	David G. Gorenstein	University of Illinois, Chicago	Engineering of new DNA binding proteins		
Natural Sciences	Molecular & Cellular Biology	Samson R. Gross	Duke University	Molecular genetics and the history of migratory populations		
Natural Sciences	Molecular & Cellular Biology	Sung-Hou Kim	UC Berkeley	Biomolecular recognition and communication		
Natural Sciences	Molecular & Cellular Biology	Keith Moffat	Cornell University	X-ray Laue diffraction from protein crystals		
Natural Sciences	Molecular & Cellular Biology	Franklin W. Stahl	University of Oregon	Molecular pathways of genetic recombination		
Natural Sciences	Molecular & Cellular Biology	Robert H. Waterston	Washington University School of Medicine	Genes affecting muscle development in nematodes		
Natural Sciences	Molecular & Cellular Biology	Zena Werb	UC San Francisco			
Natural Sciences	Neuroscience	Richard J. Miller	University of Chicago			
Natural Sciences	Neuroscience	Louis French Reichardt	UC San Francisco	Developmental neurobiology		
Natural Sciences	Organismic Biology & Ecology	Norman T. Adler	University of Pennsylvania	Biological psychology of reproduction		
Natural Sciences	Organismic Biology & Ecology	William E. Bradshaw	University of Oregon	Population dynamics of British tree-hole mosquitos		
Natural Sciences	Organismic Biology & Ecology	Leo W. Buss	Yale University	Evolution of individuality		
Natural Sciences	Organismic Biology & Ecology	John A. Endler	University of Utah	Evolution of animal color patterns		
Natural Sciences	Organismic Biology & Ecology	Peter R. Grant	University of Michigan			
Natural Sciences	Organismic Biology & Ecology	Jonathan David Roughgarden	Stanford University			
Natural Sciences	Physics	William A. Bardeen	Fermi National Accelerator Laboratory	Application of quantum field theory to elementary particle physics		
Natural Sciences	Physics	John Lawrence Cardy	UC Santa Barbara	Theoretical aspects of particle physics		
Natural Sciences	Physics	Min Chen	Massachusetts Institute of Technology			
Natural Sciences	Physics	Noel A. Clark	University of Colorado, Boulder	Colloidal liquids and crystals		
Natural Sciences	Physics	Daniel Z. Freedman	Massachusetts Institute of Technology	Supersymmetric quantum field theory and supergravity	Also won in 1973	
Natural Sciences	Physics	Pierre Ramond	University of Florida			
Natural Sciences	Physics	George F. Sterman	SUNY at Stony Brook	Strong interaction physics		
Natural Sciences	Physics	John W. Wilkins	Cornell University	Heavy fermion systems		
Natural Sciences	Plant Sciences	John J. Ewel	University of Florida			
Natural Sciences	Plant Sciences	Douglas E. Gill	University of Maryland			
Natural Sciences	Plant Sciences	Jon E. Keeley	Occidental College			
Natural Sciences	Statistics	Joseph Gastwirth	George Washington University	Statistical problems in law and public policy		
Social Sciences	Anthropology & Cultural Studies	Matt Cartmill	Duke University	Human estrangement from nature in modern thought		
Social Sciences	Anthropology & Cultural Studies	Mark N. Cohen	SUNY at Plattsburgh	Civilization and health		
Social Sciences	Anthropology & Cultural Studies	F. Clark Howell	UC Berkeley	Earliest human settlement of Europe		
Social Sciences	Anthropology & Cultural Studies	William Hardy McNeill	University of Chicago	Biography of Arnold J. Toynbee	Also won in 1971	
Social Sciences	Anthropology & Cultural Studies	Emiko Ohnuki-Tierney	University of Wisconsin-Madison	Symbolic transformations in Japanese culture		
Social Sciences	Anthropology & Cultural Studies	Richard A. Shweder	University of Chicago			
Social Sciences	Anthropology & Cultural Studies	Aidan W. Southall	University of Wisconsin-Madison	The segmentary state		
Social Sciences	Anthropology & Cultural Studies	Dennis Tedlock	Boston University			
Social Sciences	Anthropology & Cultural Studies	Russell H. Tuttle	Emory University			
Social Sciences	Economics	Stanley Fischer	Massachusetts Institute of Technology	Causes, consequences, and control of high inflation rates		
Social Sciences	Economics	Henry B. Hansmann	Yale University	Political economy of cooperative enterprise		
Social Sciences	Economics	Charles E. Lindblom	Yale University	Social science in problem solving	Also won in 1950	
Social Sciences	Economics	Glenn C. Loury	Harvard University			
Social Sciences	Economics	Andreu Mas-Colell	Harvard University	Complexity of economic decision rules		
Social Sciences	Economics	Herbert Eli Scarf	Yale University	Mathematical economics and complexity theory		
Social Sciences	Geography & Environmental Studies	Lawrence A. Brown	Ohio State University	How development affects migration and urbanization in Third World settings, especially in Latin America		
Social Sciences	Geography & Environmental Studies	Thomas Thorstein Veblen	University of Colorado, Boulder	Stability of the forest steppe boundary in Patagonia		
Social Sciences	Law	Bruce Arnold Ackerman	Columbia Law School	The American Constitution		
Social Sciences	Law	Robert D. Cooter	UC Berkeley	Economic principles in law and political philosophy		
Social Sciences	Law	Richard A. Falk	Princeton University	Promise and performance of international law		
Social Sciences	Law	Marc Galanter	University of Wisconsin-Madison	Litigation in the contemporary US		
Social Sciences	Law	Charles W. McCurdy	University of Virginia	Stephen J. Field		
Social Sciences	Law	John Henry Merryman	Stanford University			
Social Sciences	Political Science	Robert H. Bates	California Institute of Technology	Cash cropping and politics in Kenya		
Social Sciences	Political Science	H. Hugh Heclo	Harvard University	Constitution of the welfare state		
Social Sciences	Political Science	Nelson W. Polsby	UC Berkeley	Modernization of the US senate, 1940-1980	Also won in 1977	
Social Sciences	Political Science	Deborah A. Stone	Massachusetts Institute of Technology	Political boundaries and professional logics		
Social Sciences	Psychology	William K. Estes	Harvard University	Models of human information processing and decision making		
Social Sciences	Psychology	Barbara Jean Gillam	SUNY College of Optometry	Illusions and perceptual theory		
Social Sciences	Psychology	Robert J. Sternberg	Yale University	Concept of intelligence		
Social Sciences	Psychology	Kenneth Norman Wexler	UC Irvine	Theoretical studies in the learning of language		
Social Sciences	Sociology	Peter M. Blau	Columbia University	Influences of social conditions on the arts		
Social Sciences	Sociology	Victoria E. Bonnell	UC Berkeley	Collective response of artisans to industrialization		
Social Sciences	Sociology	Michael Hout	UC Berkeley	Occupational mobility in Ireland		
Social Sciences	Sociology	Bennetta Jules-Rosette	UC San Diego			
Social Sciences	Sociology	Kristin Luker	UC San Diego	History of the sex education movement in the US		
Social Sciences	Sociology	Andrew G. Walder	Columbia University	Social interpretation of the Chinese Cultural Revolution		

== 1985 Latin American and Caribbean Fellows ==
Category	Field of Study	Fellow	Institutional association	Research topic	Notes	Ref
Creative Arts	Drama & Performance Art	Antonio Skármeta		Writing		
Creative Arts	Fiction	Miguel Donoso Pareja		Writing		
Creative Arts	Fiction	Diamela Eltit		Por la patria (published 1985)		
Creative Arts	Film	Nicolás Echevarría		Filmmaking		
Creative Arts	Fine Arts	Jacobo Borges		Painting		
Creative Arts	Fine Arts	Eugenio Dittborn Santa Cruz	Instituto Cultural de Las Condes	Visual art		
Creative Arts	Fine Arts	Alfredo Jaar				
Creative Arts	Music Composition	Marlos Nobre		Composing		
Humanities	Fine Arts Research	Guillermo Tovar de Teresa		Baroque art and architecture in Mexico		
Humanities	General Nonfiction	Alejandro Rossi Guerrero	Universidad Nacional Autónoma de México	Fiction and essays		
Humanities	Iberian & Latin American History	Maria Odila Leite da Silva Dias	Universidade de São Paulo	Social and political history of Brazil, 1822-1868		
Humanities	Iberian & Latin American History	Carlos Sempat Assadourian	Colegio de México	Mining technology in the economy of the colonial Andes		
Humanities	Linguistics	Juan M. Lope-Blanch	Universidad Nacional Autónoma de México	Language of the Spanish-speaking population of the southwestern US		
Humanities	Philosophy	Alfonso Gómez-Lobo	Georgetown University			
Natural Sciences	Chemistry	Frank Herbert Quina	Universidade de São Paulo			
Natural Sciences	Earth Science	Constantino Mpodozis Marín	Servicio Nacional de Geología y Minería	Structural and geochemical studies of the Chilean Andes		
Natural Sciences	Mathematics	Marcos Dajczer	Instituto de Matematica Pura e Aplicada	Differential geometry		
Natural Sciences	Mathematics	Ricardo Mañé	Instituto de Matematica Pura e Aplicada			
Natural Sciences	Medicine & Health	Ruy Pérez Tamayo	Universidad Nacional Autónoma de México	Historical evolutions of the concept of disease		
Natural Sciences	Molecular & Cellular Biology	Jesús Adolfo García Sáinz	Universidad Nacional Autónoma de México	Actions of mechanisms of pertussis toxin		
Natural Sciences	Molecular & Cellular Biology	Rafael Vicuña	Pontificia Universidad Católica de Chile	Replication and maintenance properties of a bacterial plasmid		
Natural Sciences	Organismic Biology & Ecology	Antonio José Brack Egg	Proyecto Especial Pichis Palcazú	Ecology and conservation of the fauna of Peru		
Natural Sciences	Physics	Alberto Robledo	Universidad Nacional Autónoma de México	Structure and thermodyamics of microemulsions		
Natural Sciences	Plant Science	Rodolfo Augusto Sánchez	Universidad de Buenos Aires and CONICET	Physiological and biochemical mechanisms of the regulation of seed germination		
Social Sciences	Anthropology & Cultural Studies	Roger Bartra Muría	Universidad Nacional Autónoma de México			
Social Sciences	Anthropology & Cultural Studies	Roberto DaMatta	Museo Nacional do Brazil			
Social Sciences	Economics	Roberto Brás Matos Macedo	Universidade de São Paulo	Labor in Brazilian economic history		
Social Sciences	Political Science	José María Aricó				

== See also ==
- Guggenheim Fellowship
- List of Guggenheim Fellowships awarded in 1984
- List of Guggenheim Fellowships awarded in 1986
