= Artur Oscar Lopes =

Brazilian mathematician

- Born: October 17, 1950; Rio de Janeiro, Brazil
- Education: Ph.D. in Mathematics from IMPA (1977)
- Occupation(s): Writer, Mathematician
- Employer(s): UFRGS, Porto Alegre
- Known for: Work on dynamical systems and ergodic theory
- Notable work: Tópicos de Mecânica Clássica; Cálculo Tensorial; Teoria dos Corpos; Equações Diferenciais Ordinárias
- Awards: Brazil's National Order of Scientific Merit in mathematics

Artur Oscar Lopes (born 17 October 1950 in the city of Rio de Janeiro) is a Brazilian writer and mathematician working on dynamical systems and ergodic theory. He is a professor at UFRGS, Porto Alegre.

He earned his Ph.D. from the IMPA in 1977 under the supervision of Jacob Palis.

He is a recipient of Brazil's National Order of Scientific Merit in mathematics. Since 2007 he has been a member of the Brazilian Academy of Sciences.

He is the author of the textbooks Tópicos de Mecânica Clássica, Cálculo Tensorial, Teoria dos Corpos, and Equações Diferenciais Ordinárias.

== Selected publications ==
- with A. Freire and R. Mañé: Freire, Alexandre; Lopes, Artur; Mañé, Ricardo (March 1983), "An invariant measure for rational maps", Bulletin of the Brazilian Mathematical Society, 14: 45–62, doi:10.1007/BF02584744
- Lopes, Artur O. (1989), "The dimension spectrum of the maximal measure", SIAM Journal on Mathematical Analysis, 20 (5): 1243–1254, doi:10.1137/0520081
- with G. Contreras and Ph. Thieullen: Contreras, G.; Lopes, A. O.; Thieullen, PH. (October 2001), "Lyapunov minimizing measures for expanding maps of the circle", Ergodic Theory and Dynamical Systems, 21 (5): 1379–1409, doi:10.1017/S0143385701001663, hdl:10183/27431, S2CID 37683359
- Lopes, A.O. (October 1993), "The zeta function, non-differentiability of pressure, and the critical exponent of transition", Advances in Mathematics, 101 (2): 133–165, doi:10.1006/aima.1993.1045
