= Alberto Pinto (mathematician) =

Portuguese mathematics professor (born 1964)

Alberto Adrego Pinto
- Born: 23 February 1964 (age 62); Porto, Portugal
- Education: University of Warwick; University of Porto
- Known for: Work in dynamical systems
- Scientific career
- Fields: Mathematics
- Workplaces: University of Porto
- Thesis: Convergence of Renormalisation and Rigidity of Dynamical Systems (1991)

Alberto Adrego Pinto is a full professor at the Department of Mathematics, Faculty of Sciences, University of Porto (Portugal). He is a researcher of the Laboratory of Artificial Intelligence and Decision Support, Institute for Systems and Computer Engineering LIAAD, INESC TEC. He is the founder and editor-in-chief of the Journal of Dynamics and Games, published by the American Institute of Mathematical Sciences (AIMS). He is the President of the Portuguese International Center for Mathematics (CIM). Currently, he is also a Special Visiting Researcher from CNPq at Instituto Nacional de Matemática Pura e Aplicada (IMPA), Rio de Janeiro, Brazil.

== Education ==
Pinto was an undergraduate student in applied mathematics at University of Porto (1986). He did his MSc with distinction (1998) and his PhD (1991) in mathematics at University of Warwick, UK. He did his Aggregation in Applied Mathematics (2002), passing with unanimous vote, at University of Porto.

== Career ==
Pinto worked with David Rand on his master's thesis (1989) that studied the work of Mitchell Feigenbaum and Dennis Sullivan on scaling functions and he went on to a PhD (1991) on the universality features of other classes of maps that form the boundary between order and chaos.

During this time Pinto met a number of the leaders in dynamical systems, notably Dennis Sullivan and Maurício Peixoto, and this had a great impact on his career. As a result, he and his collaborators have made many important contributions to the study of the fine-scale structure of dynamical systems and this has appeared in leading journals and in his book "Fine Structures of Hyperbolic Diffeomorphisms" (2010) coauthored with Flávio Ferreira and David Rand.

While a postdoc with Dennis Sullivan at the CUNY Graduate Center at City University of New York he met Edson de Faria and through Maurício Peixoto he got in contact with Welington de Melo. With de Melo he proved the rigidity of smooth unimodal maps in the boundary between chaos and order extending the work of Curtis T. McMullen. Furthermore, de Faria, de Melo and Pinto proved the conjecture raised in 1978 in the work of Feigenbaum and Coullet-Tresser which the characterizes the period-doubling boundary between chaos and order for unimodal maps. This appeared in the research article "Global Hyperbolicity of Renormalization for Smooth Unimodal Mappings" published at the journal Annals of Mathematics (2006) and was based in particular in the previous works of Sandy Davie, Dennis Sullivan, Curtis T. McMullen and Mikhail Lyubich.

Since then Pinto has branched out into more applied areas. He has contributed across a remarkably broad area of science including optics, game theory and mathematical economics, finance, immunology, epidemiology, and climate and energy. In these applied areas, he has published widely overpassing more than one hundred scientific articles. He edited two volumes, with Maurício Peixoto and David Rand, entitled "Dynamics and Games I and II" (2011). These two volumes initiated the new Springer Proceedings in Mathematics series. He edited with David Zilberman the volume entitled "Optimization, Dynamics, Modeling and Bioeconomy I" (2015) that will appear at Springer Proceedings in Mathematics & Statistics series.

Pinto with Michel Benaïm founded the Journal of Dynamics and Games (2014) of the American Institute of Mathematical Sciences (AIMS) and they are the editors in chief. He has also increasingly taken on important administrative tasks. He was a member of the steering committee of Probabilistic Methods in Non-Hyperbolic Dynamics (Prodyn) at the European Science Foundation (1999–2001). He was the executive coordinator (2009–2010) of the Scientific Council of Exact Sciences and Engineering at the Fundação para a Ciência e Tecnologia. He is currently the President of the International Center for Mathematics (CIM), Portugal and has started the "CIM Mathematical Sciences Series" to be published by Springer-Verlag.

== Research ==
Pinto has made numerous significant scientific research contributions that are recognized internationally in the field of dynamical systems, game theory and applications. The scientific papers resulting from his achievements have been published in some of the most prestigious scientific research journals in the world, for example, Annals of Mathematics, Transactions of the American Mathematical Society, Journal of the London Mathematical Society, Bulletin of the London Mathematical Society and Communications in Mathematical Physics. In addition, he has authored books published in prestigious scientific series, like Springer Monographs in Mathematics, and have edited similar titles, one of which initiated the new Springer Proceedings series in Mathematics. He supervised many PhD students.

The impact and significance of his contributions has resulted in many presentations at top international conferences around the world, such as the International Congress of Mathematicians (ICM), the International Congress on Industrial and Applied Mathematics (ICIAM), the European Conference on Operational Research (EURO), the Conference of the Society for the Advancement of Economic Theory (SAET), the Public Economic Theory Conference (PET), the European Conference on Mathematical and Theoretical Biology (ECMTB), the Palestinian Conference in Modern Trends in Mathematics and Physics (PCMTMP), the Australasian Meeting of the Econometric Society (ESAM), the South and South East Asia Econometric Society Meeting (SAMES), Latin American Meeting of the Econometric Society (LAMES) and the International Conference of the Society on Difference Equations (ICDEA).

Citing the words of Jacob Palis and Enrique Pujals in the preface of Pinto–Ferreira–Rand's Springer monograph: "All the smooth conjugacy classes of a given topological model are classified using Pinto's and Rand's HR structures". Melo-Pinto's Communications in Mathematical Physics paper proves the rigidity of the unimodal maps in the boundary between chaos and order. Pinto and Rand's Nonlinearity paper proved the existence of a universal constant 2.11 that is the degree of smoothness of the conjugacy between infinitely renormalizable unimodal maps. Almeida–Portela–Pinto's TAMS paper exhibits new tilings determined by circle diffeomorphisms that are low smoothness fixed points of renormalization. Alves–Pinheiro–Pinto's paper in JLMS proved that if a topological conjugacy between multimodal maps is smooth at a point in the expanding set then the conjugacy is smooth in a renormalization interval. Carvalho–Peixoto–Pinheiro–Pinto's TAMS paper makes a clear connection between the otherwise distant concepts of focal decomposition, renormalization and semiclassical physics.

Pinto's paper in JDG created new models to study the appearance of sudden social and political disruptions using the replicator equation in the theory of planned behavior. Pliska–Pinheiro–Pinto Optimization paper determined the optimal life insurance purchase in a continuous-time model where the individual's lifetime is modeled through the concept of uncertain lifetime found in reliability theory. Pinto–Pinheiro–Yannacopoulos's JDEA paper study price formation in the Arrow–Debreu financial models with multiple assets from an unconventional perspective using Edgeworthian exchange models. Pinto–Pinheiro–Yannacopoulos's JDEA paper develops a stochastic model for the dynamics of bargaining. Araujo–-Choubdar-Maldonado–Pinheiro–Pinto proved the stochastic stability of sunspot equilibria in some specific cases. Ferreira–Oliveira–Pinto's Optimization paper studied a Cournot competition where firms invest in R&D projects to reduce their production costs. Pinto–Gonçalves–Ferreira's Physica A paper analyzed the Bramwell–Holdsworth–Pinton (BHP) universality of several stocks and indexes traded in the New York Stock Exchange (NYSE). Burroughs–Oliveira–Pinto's JTB paper incorporated the effect of memory T cells in the T cells model. Pinto–Martins–Stollenwerk Mathematical Biosciences paper related the deterministic and the stochastic epidemic models.

From 2015 to 2018, Pinto was a special visiting researcher of CNPq (PEV-CNPq) at IMPA.

== International Center for Mathematics ==
CIM stands for International Center for Mathematics, or Centro Internacional de Matemática (in Portuguese). CIM is a not-for-profit, privately run association that aims at developing and promoting research in mathematics. At present CIM has 41 associates, including 13 Portuguese universities, the University of Macau, 23 research centres and institutes, the Portuguese Mathematical Society (SPM), the Portuguese Operational Research Society (APDIO), the Portuguese Statistical Society (SPE) and the Portuguese Association of Theoretical, Applied and Computational Mechanics (APMTAC).

CIM was formally set up on 3 December 1993 and was launched as a national project to involve all Portuguese mathematicians. During the past years, CIM has organized several meetings in mathematics and many interdisciplinary conferences. As a result, CIM has become an important forum for national and international cooperation among mathematicians and other scientists. CIM is also a privileged place for the exchange of information among Portuguese researchers and scientists from Portuguese-speaking countries.
