= Karl-Otto Stöhr =

German mathematician

Karl-Otto Stöhr (born 9 May 1942) is a German mathematician working on algebraic geometry. He is a titular researcher at the IMPA.

Stöhr is a titular member of the Brazilian Academy of Sciences and has received Brazil's National Order of Scientific Merit. He is also a member of the European Academy of Sciences.

He obtained his Ph.D. at the University of Bonn in 1967 under the guidance of Wolfgang Krull and Jacques Tits.

Arnaldo Garcia was a student of his.

== Selected papers ==
- With J. F. Voloch: "Weierstrass points and curves over finite fields" (1986)
- "On the poles of regular differentials of singular curves" (1993)
