= Carlos Matheus =

Brazilian mathematician

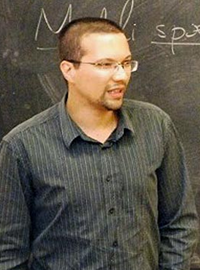
Carlos Matheus

Carlos Matheus Silva Santos (born May 1, 1984 in Aracaju) is a Brazilian mathematician working in dynamical systems, analysis and geometry. He is research director at the CNRS, in Paris.

He earned his Ph.D. from the Instituto de Matemática Pura e Aplicada (IMPA) in 2004 under the supervision of Marcelo Viana, at the age of 19.

== Selected publications ==
=== Papers ===
- with G. Forni, and A. Zorich: "Square-tiled cyclic covers", Journal of Modern Dynamics, vol. 5, no. 2, pp. 285–318 (2011).
- with A. Avila, and J.-C. Yoccoz: "SL(2,R)-invariant probability measures on the moduli spaces of translation surfaces are regular", Geometric and Functional Analysis, vol. 23, no. 6, pp. 1705–1729 (2013).
- with M. Möller, and J.-C. Yoccoz: "A criterion for the simplicity of the Lyapunov spectrum of square-tiled surfaces", Inventiones mathematicae (2014).
- With A. Arbieto: "A pasting lemma and some applications for conservative systems". Ergodic Theory and Dynamical Systems, 27(5), 1399–1417 (2007).

=== Books ===
- 2007: Joint with A. Arbieto and C. G. Moreira, Aspectos Ergódicos da Teoria dos Números (in Portuguese) ISBN 978-85-244-0250-0
- 2009: Joint with A. Arbieto and C. G. Moreira, The remarkable effectiveness of ergodic theory in number theory
- 2018: Dynamical Aspects of Teichmüller Theory ISBN 978-3-319-92158-7
- 2020: Joint with D. Lima, C. G. Moreira and S. Romaña, Classical and Dynamical Lagrange and Markov spectra ISBN 978-981-12-2528-4
