= Welington de Melo =

Brazilian mathematician

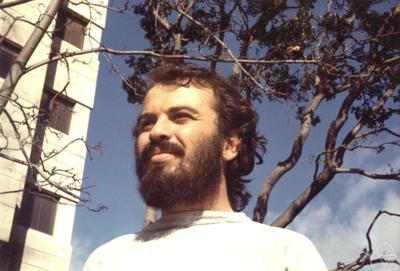
- Melo in 1973
- Born: 17 November 1946; Guapé, Minas Gerais
- Died: 21 December 2016 (aged 70)
- Education: Instituto Nacional de Matemática Pura e Aplicada
- Known for: Contributions to dynamical systems theory
- Scientific career
- Fields: Mathematics
- Workplaces: Instituto Nacional de Matemática Pura e Aplicada (1974–2016)
- Thesis: Structural Stability of Diffeomorphisms on Two-Manifolds (1973)
- Doctoral advisor: Jacob Palis
- Doctoral students: Artur Avila

Welington Celso de Melo (17 November 1946 – 21 December 2016) was a Brazilian mathematician. Known for his contributions to dynamical systems theory, he served as full professor at Instituto Nacional de Matemática Pura e Aplicada from 1980 to 2016. Melo wrote numerous papers, one being a complete description of the topological behavior of 1-dimensional real dynamical systems (co-authored with Marco Martens and Sebastian van Strien). He proved the global hyperbolicity of renormalization for C^{r} unimodal maps (co-authored with Alberto Pinto and Edson de Faria). He was a recipient of the 2003 TWAS Prize.

== Biography ==
Born on November 17, 1946, in Guapé, Minas Gerais, Welington studied electrical engineering at the Federal University of Minas Gerais (1969). He adopted mathematics after attending a course in the researcher of the Elon Lages Lima Institute in a colloquium in Poços de Caldas, Minas Gerais. Invited by Elon to study at Instituto Nacional de Matemática Pura e Aplicada he moved to Rio de Janeiro with his wife Gilza in 1970, with Jacob Palis his advisor, where Welington completed his doctorate in two years, with a thesis published in the prestigious Inventiones Mathematicae in 1972. He did his post-doctorate in mathematics at the University of California, Berkeley in 1972. He returned two years later to Brazil to make a career as a researcher at IMPA, where he stayed ever since.

Appreciated by different generations of mathematicians, Welington was known and respected for his academic rigor and scientific productivity. Besides mathematics, he was passionate about sailing. On 1987 Steve Smale, Charles Pugh and Welington sailed the Pacific in a long journey on Smale's 43-foot Stardust. On his 30-foot Doisdu boat, he sailed at least a hundred days a year, mostly along Angra dos Reis's coast. He interpreted the wind with mastery, a phenomenon that can be modeled by dynamic systems, his mathematical specialty. He was proud to have taken on board the Doisdu six Fields Medal recipients and many friends of IMPA.

He died on December 21, 2016, at age 70, of complications of a heart attack.

== Awards and honors ==
- Brazilian Academy of Sciences, Member (1991)
- National Order of Scientific Merit, Commander (1996)
- Invited Lecturer at the International Congress of Mathematicians, (1998)
- National Order of Scientific Merit, Grand Cross (2002)
- Third World Academy of Sciences Prize (2003)
- The World Academy of Sciences, Member (2005)
