= India as a Secular State =

1963 book by Donald Smith

- First edition
- Author: Donald Eugene Smith
- Language: English
- Genre: Non-fiction
- Publisher: Princeton University Press
- Publication date: 1963
- Publication place: United States

India as a Secular State is a book written by Donald Eugene Smith and published by Princeton University Press in 1963.

The book was described as a "classic" by the lawyer and historian A. G. Noorani in 2010, and as a "seminal work" on Hindu nationalism by the historian Ainslie Embree. Among critical reviewers were Marc Galanter and John T. Flint, to whom Smith published a rejoinder in 1965.

== Synopsis ==
The book is divided into seven parts consisting of sixteen chapters in total. In Part 1 of the book, titled The Secular State in Perspective, Smith writes about the concept of the secular state, specifically commenting on freedom of religion, citizenship, and separation of state and religion. Smith then goes on to trace the secular state in history writing about the Church and state in the Middle Ages, the Reformation, and secularism in America and modern Europe. He then goes on to comment on the problem of secularism in Asia focusing on the nature of the major religions in Asia like Hinduism, Buddhism, and Islam. He comments on the religious minorities, the role played by the colonial powers in the Philippines, India, Indo-China, and Indonesia with respect to religion and secularism, and the role of religion in Burmese, Ceylonese, Indonesian, and Indian nationalism together with a discussion on the movement for creating Pakistan. He concludes with a discussion on secularism in Turkey.

In Part 2 of the book, titled Basis for the Secular State in India, Smith comments on the relationship between State and religion in ancient and medieval India, and also during British rule. This part also has a discussion on the description of religious freedom, separation of state and religion, and citizenship in the Indian Constitution. Finally, this part concludes with a commentary on Indian nationalism, the tradition of Hindu tolerance, and western secularism.

In Part 3 of the book, titled Religious Liberty and State Regulation, Smith comments on the issue of religious propagation giving different views on this issue: the general Hindu attitude, the Hindu universalist view, the Hindu communalist view, the Indian Christian view, and the humanist liberal view. He comments on the laws related to State regulation of religious propagation prior to 1950, and the provisions for the same in the Indian constitution. He also writes about legislation related to religious propagation, and the related problems of public order with respect to this issue. He then discusses the issue of foreign missionaries in India from the times of British rule to the 1956 Niyogi Committee findings and recommendations and the ensuing response. Smith then comments on the topic of public safety and regulation of religion in which he discusses the issue of suppression of anti-social religious practices by the State, the preservation of public order and restrictions on political involvement. He then describes the role of the State in reforming religion, giving the historical perspective and the problems confronting the modern Indian state in this respect. There follows a discussion on the reform of Hindu temples in which Smith discusses the reforms through legislation and judicial verdicts of animal sacrifices and temple prostitution occurring in certain Hindu temples, and also the right of Harijans to enter temples. The section concludes with a commentary on reforms in Hindu religious endowments through legislation and judicial verdicts, the role played by the central government on these issues, and finally regulation through legislation of the activities of itinerant sadhus.
