= Alberto Pinto =

Alberto Pinto may refer to:

- Alberto Pinto (interior designer) (born 1945), photographer and interior designer
- Alberto Pinto (mathematician) (born 1964), Portuguese mathematician
