= Marcelo Viana =

Brazilian mathematician

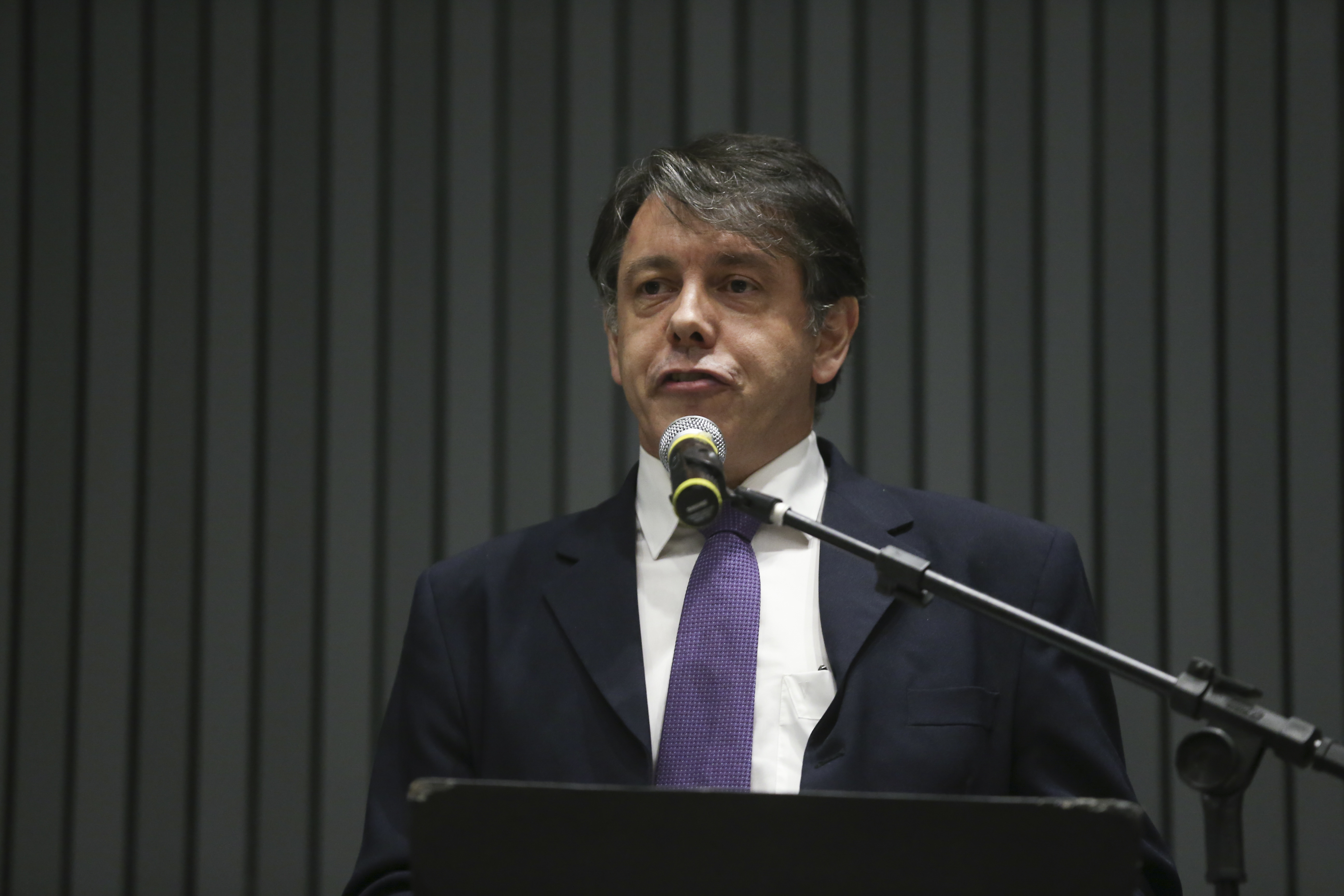
- Born: March 4, 1962 (age 64); Rio de Janeiro, Brazil
- Education: University of Porto (B. Sc.); IMPA (Ph. D.)
- Known for: Zorich–Kontsevich conjecture
- Awards: ICTP Ramanujan Prize (2005); Brazil's National Order of Scientific Merit; Grand Prix scientifique de la Fondation Louis D. (2016)
- Scientific career
- Fields: Mathematics
- Workplaces: Instituto Nacional de Matemática Pura e Aplicada
- Thesis: Strange Attractors in Higher Dimensions (1990)
- Doctoral advisor: Jacob Palis
- Doctoral students: Carlos Matheus

Marcelo Miranda Viana da Silva (born 4 March 1962) is a Brazilian mathematician working in dynamical systems theory. He proved the Zorich–Kontsevich conjecture together with Artur Avila.

He was a Guggenheim Fellow in 1993. He received the TWAS Prize in 1998 and in 2005 he was awarded the inaugural ICTP Ramanujan Prize for his research achievements.

Viana was vice-president of the International Mathematical Union in 2011–2014, and president of the Brazilian Mathematical Society (2013–2015).

In 1998, he was a plenary speaker at the International Congress of Mathematicians, in Berlin.

Viana is director elected of the IMPA (for the period 2016–2019).

Viana is a columnist for Folha de S.Paulo.

He was the chair of the executive committee for the 2018 International Congress of Mathematicians, Rio de Janeiro.

== Biography ==
Viana was born in Rio de Janeiro, Brazil, his parents being Portuguese. He grew up in Portugal, and his undergraduate studies were at the University of Porto. He received his Ph.D. degree from the IMPA in Rio de Janeiro, with Jacob Palis as advisor. He is now director at IMPA.

== Work ==
Viana's work concerns chaotic dynamical systems and strange attractors.

== Selected publications ==
Books:

- with José Espinar: Differential Equations: A Dynamical Systems Approach to Theory and Practice (2021)
- with Krerley Oliveira: Foundations of Ergodic Theory, Cambridge University Press

Research papers:

- jointly with AVILA, A., "Simplicity of Lyapunov spectra: proof of the Zorich–Kontsevich conjecture". Acta Mathematica. vol. 198 (2007), no. 1, pp. 1–56.
- jointly with PALIS, J., "High dimension diffeomorphisms displaying infinitely many periodic attractors". Annals of Mathematics. vol. 140 (1994), no. 1, pp. 207–250.
- jointly with MORA, L., "Abundance of strange attractors". Acta Mathematica. vol. 171 (1993), no. 1, pp. 1–71.
