= Enrique Pujals =

Argentine-Brazilian mathematician

- Born: Pergamino, Argentina
- Education: IMPA (Ph. D.); University of Buenos Aires (B. Sc.)
- Awards: TWAS Prize in Mathematics (2009); ICTP Ramanujan Prize (2008); Brazil's National Order of Scientific Merit
- Scientific career
- Fields: Mathematics
- Doctoral advisor: Jacob Palis

Enrique Ramiro Pujals is an Argentine-Brazilian mathematician known for his contributions to the understanding of dynamical systems. Since fall of 2018, he has been a professor at the Graduate Center at the City University of New York.

== Education ==
After earning an undergraduate degree in mathematics at the University of Buenos Aires in 1992, he became a Ph.D. student at the Instituto Nacional de Matemática Pura e Aplicada, where he was a student of Jacob Palis, completing his Ph.D. in 1996. He was a Guggenheim Fellow in 2000. Before moving to CUNY in 2018, he was a faculty member at IMPA since 2003.

== Awards ==
He was an invited speaker at the International Congress of Mathematicians in Beijing 2002. Won the ICTP Ramanujan Prize (2008), UMALCA Prize in Mathematics (2004), TWAS Prize in Mathematics (2009), is a member of the Brazilian Academy of Sciences and receive the Brazilian National Order of Scientific Merit in 2013.

== Selected publications ==
- S. Crovisier, E.R. Pujals, C. Tresser, Mildly dissipative diffeomorphisms of the disk with zero entropy Acta Mathematica, Volume 232 (2024) Number 2, 221-323.
- S. Crovisier, E.R. Pujals, Essential hyperbolicity and homoclinic bifurcations: a dichotomy phenomenon/mechanism for diffeomorphisms, Inventiones Mathematicae, (2015) Volume 201, Issue 2, 385–517.
- Pujals, E. R.; Sambarino, M. "On the dynamics of dominated splitting", Annals of Mathematics, Princeton, (169) (2009), 675–740.
- Morales, C.; Pacifico, M.J.; Pujals, E. R. Robust transitive singular sets for 3-flows are partially hyperbolic attractors or repellers, Annals of Mathematics, Princeton. 160, no 2, (2004), 375–43.
- Bonatti, C.; Diaz, L.; Pujals, E. R. "A C1-generic dichotomy for diffeomorphisms: Weak forms of hyperbolicity or infinitely many sinks or sources". Annals of Mathematics, Princeton, v. 158, pp. 355–418, 2003.
- Pujals, E. R.; Sambarino, M. "Homoclinic tangencies and hyperbolicity for surface diffeomorphisms". Annals of Mathematics, Princeton, v. 151, n. 3, pp. 961–1023, 2000.
- L. Diaz, E.R. Pujals, R. Ures, Partial hyperbolicity and robust transitivity, Acta Mathematica 183, no. 1 (1999), 1–43.
