= Regina S. Burachik =

Argentine mathematician

Academic background
- Education: Instituto Nacional de Matemática Pura e Aplicada
- Thesis: Generalized Proximal Point Method for the Variational Inequality Problem (1995)
- Doctoral advisor: Alfredo Noel Iusem

Academic work
- Discipline: Mathematics
- Sub-discipline: Mathematical optimization, Mathematical analysis
- Institutions: University of South Australia

Regina Sandra Burachik is an Argentine mathematician who works on optimization and analysis (particularly: convex analysis, functional analysis and non-smooth analysis). Currently, she is a professor at the University of South Australia.

She earned her Ph.D. from the IMPA in 1995 under the supervision of Alfredo Noel Iusem (Generalized Proximal Point Method for the Variational Inequality Problem). In her thesis, she "introduced and analyzed solution methods for variational inequalities, the latter being a generalization of the convex constrained optimization problem."

== Selected publications ==
=== Articles ===
- with A. N. Iusem and B. F. Svaiter. "Enlargement of monotone operators with applications to variational inequalities", Set-Valued Analysis
- with A. N. Iusem. "A generalized proximal point algorithm for the variational inequality problem in a Hilbert space", SIAM Journal on Optimization
- with A. N. Iusem. "Set-valued mappings & enlargements of monotone operators", Optimization and its Applications
- with B. F. Svaiter. "Maximal monotone operators, convex functions and a special family of enlargements", Set-Valued Analysis

=== Books ===
- With Iusem: Set-Valued Mappings and Enlargements of Monotone Operators (2007)
- Variational Analysis and Generalized Differentiation in Optimization and Control (2010, as editor)
