= Marc Galanter =

Marc Galanter may refer to:

- Marc Galanter (law professor) (1931–2026), American law professor
- Marc Galanter (psychiatrist), American psychiatrist
