= Antonio Mendoza =

Antonio Mendoza may refer to:

- Antonio Mendoza (sport shooter) (born 1939), Filipino sport shooter
- Tony Mendoza (photographer) (Antonio Mendoza, born 1941), Cuban-American photographer
- Antonio de Mendoza (1495–1552), first viceroy of New Spain

== See also ==
- Antonio Hurtado de Mendoza (1586–1644), Spanish dramatist
