= Elon Lages Lima =

Brazilian mathematician (1929–2017)

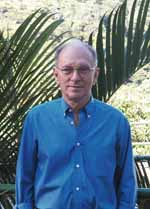
- Born: July 9, 1929; Maceió, Alagoas
- Died: May 7, 2017 (aged 87); Rio de Janeiro, Brazil
- Education: University of Chicago; University of Brazil
- Known for: Spectrum (topology)
- Scientific career
- Fields: Mathematics
- Workplaces: Instituto Nacional de Matemática Pura e Aplicada
- Thesis: Duality and Postnikov Invariants (1958)
- Doctoral advisor: Edwin Spanier

Elon Lages Lima (July 9, 1929 – May 7, 2017) was a Brazilian mathematician whose research concerned differential topology, algebraic topology, and differential geometry. Lima was an influential figure in the development of mathematics in Brazil.

Lima was professor emeritus at Instituto Nacional de Matemática Pura e Aplicada of which he was the director during three separate periods. Lima has been twice recipient of the Prêmio Jabuti from the Câmara Brasileira do Livro, for his textbooks Espaços Métricos and Álgebra Linear, and of the Anísio Teixeira Prize from the Ministry of Education and Sports. His mathematical style was heavily influenced by Bourbaki's.

== Biography ==
He began his career as a high school teacher in Fortaleza, Ceará. Lima graduated with a bachelor's degree in mathematics from the Universidade do Brasil (today UFRJ) in 1953. He obtained his doctorate in 1958 from the University of Chicago with Edwin Henry Spanier as advisor. He is a former Guggenheim Fellow, and holds memberships in the Academia Brasileira de Ciências (Brazilian Academy of Sciences) and the TWAS, the Academy of Sciences for the Developing World. He is a professor Honoris Causa of the Universidade Federal do Ceará and of the University of Brasília, where he taught from 1964 to 1965. He was a member of the Upper Board of FAPERJ from 1987 to 1991. He was also a member of the National Board of Education.

He wrote over thirty books in mathematics, some of which are intended for secondary school teachers. Between 1990 and 1995, he coordinated the IMPA-VITAE project, which held skills improvement courses for mathematics teachers in eleven cities from eight states throughout Brazil.

He received the grã-cruz ("Great Cross") of the Ordem Nacional do Mérito Científico ("National Order of Scientific Merit") of Brazil.

== Selected publications ==
- Lima, E. L. (1964). "Common singularities of commuting vector fields on 2-manifolds". Commentarii Mathematici Helvetici. vol. 39, pp. 97–110.
- Lima, E. L. (1965). "Commuting vector fields on S3". Annals of Mathematics. vol. 81, pp. 70–88.
- do Carmo, M. and Lima, E. L. (1969). "Isometric immersions with semi-definite second quadratic forms". Archiv der Mathematik vol. 20, pp. 173–175.
- Lima, E. L. (1987). "Orientability of smooth hypersurfaces and the Jordan-Brouwer separation theorem". Expositiones Mathematicae. vol. 5, pp. 283–286.

== See also ==
- Spectrum (topology), a notion introduced by Lima.

== Notes ==
Silva, C. P. . "Sobre o início e consolidação da pesquisa matemática no Brasil, Parte 2", Revista Brasileira de História da Matemática (RBHM), Vol. 6, n. 12, p. 165-196, 2006
