= Lists of mathematicians =

This list covers lists of notable mathematicians by nationality, ethnicity, religion, profession and other characteristics. Alphabetical lists are also available (see table to the right).

== Lists by nationality, ethnicity or religion ==
- List of American mathematicians
  - List of African-American mathematicians
- List of Bengali mathematicians
- List of Brazilian mathematicians
- List of Chinese mathematicians
- List of German mathematicians
- List of Greek mathematicians
  - Timeline of ancient Greek mathematicians
- List of Hungarian mathematicians
- List of Indian mathematicians
- List of Italian mathematicians
- List of Iranian mathematicians
- List of Jewish mathematicians
- List of Norwegian mathematicians
- List of Muslim mathematicians
- List of Polish mathematicians
- List of Russian mathematicians
- List of Slovenian mathematicians
- List of Ukrainian mathematicians
- List of Taiwanese mathematicians
- List of Turkish mathematicians
- List of Welsh mathematicians

== Lists by profession ==
- List of actuaries
- List of game theorists
- List of geometers
- List of logicians
- List of mathematical probabilists
- List of statisticians
- List of quantitative analysts

== Other lists of mathematicians ==
- List of amateur mathematicians
- List of mathematicians born in the 19th century
- List of second-generation mathematicians
- List of centenarians (scientists and mathematicians)
- List of films about mathematicians
- List of women in mathematics

== See also ==
- The Mathematics Genealogy Project – Database for the academic genealogy of mathematicians
- List of mathematical artists
- List of mathematics journals
- List of publications in mathematics
- Lists of mathematics topics
