= Carlos Gustavo Moreira =

Brazilian mathematician

- Born: 8 February 1973 (age 53); Rio de Janeiro
- Occupation: Mathematician
- Known for: Chaos theory
- Political party: Brazilian Communist Party

Carlos Gustavo Tamm de Araújo Moreira (born 8 February 1973) is a Brazilian mathematician working on dynamical systems, ergodic theory, number theory and combinatorics. Moreira is currently a researcher at the Instituto Nacional de Matemática Pura e Aplicada (IMPA), where he goes by the nickname "Gugu". He is also a member of the Brazilian Mathematical Olympiad Commission, a fanatic fan of the Brazilian football team Flamengo and a member of the Brazilian Communist Party (PCB).

Moreira obtained his Ph.D. from IMPA under the supervision of Jacob Palis in 1993, at the age of 20. He is a member of the Brazilian Academy of Sciences since 2008. In 2009 he was awarded the UMALCA Award for his contributions to mathematics.

Moreira is the recipient of the TWAS Prize in Mathematics in 2010. He was an invited speaker at the International Congress of Mathematicians of 2014 in Seoul, South Korea, and a plenary speaker at the 2018 International Congress of Mathematicians in Rio de Janeiro, Brazil.

== Selected publications ==
- Moreira, Carlos Gustavo; Yoccoz, Jean-Christophe (2001). "Stable Intersections of Regular Cantor Sets with Large Hausdorff Dimensions". Annals of Mathematics. 154 (1): 45–96. doi:10.2307/3062110. ISSN 0003-486X. JSTOR 3062110.
- Avila, Artur; Moreira, Carlos Gustavo (1 March 2005). "Statistical properties of unimodal maps: the quadratic family". Annals of Mathematics. 161 (2): 831–881. arXiv:math/0010062. doi:10.4007/annals.2005.161.831. ISSN 0003-486X.
- Alon, N.; Kohayakawa, Y.; Mauduit, Christian; Moreira, C. G.; Rödl, V. (2007). "Measures of pseudorandomness for finite sequences: typical values". Proceedings of the London Mathematical Society. 95 (3): 778–812. doi:10.1112/plms/pdm027.
- Moreira, Carlos (1 July 2018). "Geometric properties of the Markov and Lagrange spectra". Annals of Mathematics. 188 (1). arXiv:1612.05782. doi:10.4007/annals.2018.188.1.3. ISSN 0003-486X.
