= César Camacho =

Peruvian-Brazilian mathematician (born 1943)

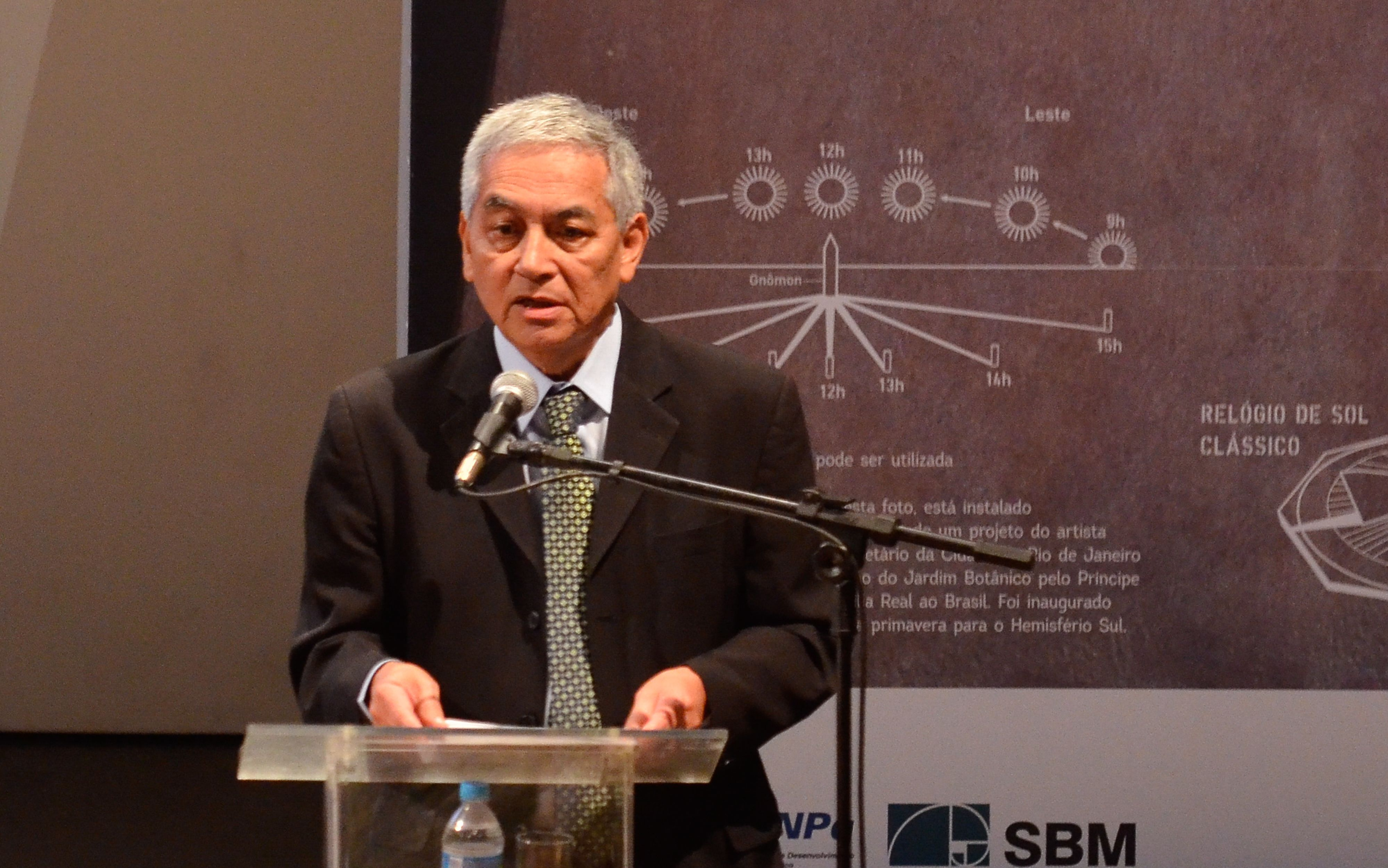
- Camacho in 2015.
- Born: César Leopoldo Camacho Manco; 15 March 1943 (age 83); Lima, Lima
- Citizenship: Peru; Brazil
- Education: University of California, Berkeley
- Known for: Camacho–Sad theorem
- Scientific career
- Fields: Mathematics
- Workplaces: Instituto Nacional de Matemática Pura e Aplicada
- Doctoral advisor: Stephen Smale

César Leopoldo Camacho Manco (Note: In this name that follows Hispanic American naming customs, the first or paternal surname is Camacho and the second or maternal family name is Manco.) (born 15 April 1943), better known as simply César Camacho, is a Peruvian-born Brazilian mathematician and former director of the IMPA. His area of research is dynamical systems theory.

Camacho earned his Ph.D. from the University of California, Berkeley, in 1971 under the supervision of Stephen Smale.

He is a member of the Brazilian Academy of Sciences and a recipient of 1996 TWAS Prize.

== Selected publications ==
- C. Camacho, P. Sad. "Invariant varieties through singularities of holomorphic vector fields", Annals of Mathematics, 1982
- C. Camacho, A. L. Neto, P. Sad. "Topological invariants and equidesingularization for holomorphic vector fields", Journal of Differential Geometry, 1984
