= Alfredo Noel Iusem =

Argentine-born Brazilian mathematician

- Born: November 10, 1949 (age 76); Buenos Aires
- Citizenship: Brazilian
- Awards: Brazilian National Order of Scientific Merit

Academic background
- Education: Stanford University
- Doctoral advisor: George Dantzig

Academic work
- Discipline: Mathematics
- Sub-discipline: Mathematical optimization
- Institutions: Instituto Nacional de Matemática Pura e Aplicada

Alfredo Noel Iusem (born 10 November 1949, in Buenos Aires) is an Argentine-born Brazilian mathematician working on mathematical optimization.

He earned his Ph.D. from Stanford University in 1981 under the supervision of George Bernard Dantzig.

He is a recipient of Brazil's National Order of Scientific Merit in mathematics. Since 2001, he has been a member of the Brazilian Academy of Sciences.

Regina Burachik was a student of his at Instituto Nacional de Matemática Pura e Aplicada.

== Selected publications ==
- Burachik, Regina S.; Iusem, Alfredo N. (1998). "A generalized proximal point algorithm for the variational inequality problem in a Hilbert space". SIAM Journal on Optimization. 8 (1): 197–216. doi:10.1137/S1052623495286302.
- Burachik, Regina S.; Iusem, Alfredo N.; Svaiter, B. F. (1997). "Enlargement of monotone operators with applications to variational inequalities". Set-Valued Analysis and Variational Analysis. 5 (2): 159–180. doi:10.1023/A:1008615624787.
- Burachik, Regina S.; Svaiter, B. F.; Teboulle, Marc (1994). "Entropy-like proximal methods in convex programming". Mathematics of Operations Research. 19 (4): 790–814. doi:10.1287/moor.19.4.790.
