= Aron Simis =

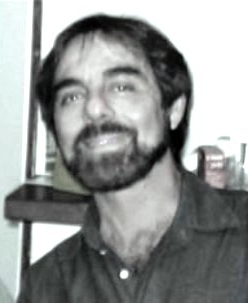

Aron Simis (born 1942 in Recife, Brazil) is a Brazilian mathematician. He is a full professor at the Federal University of Pernambuco and a Class A research scholarship recipient from the Brazilian Research Council. He earned his PhD from Queen's University, Canada.

He has previously held a full professorship at IMPA (Instituto de Matemática Pura e Applicada) in Rio de Janeiro, Brazil. He was president of the Brazilian Mathematical Society and member on several occasions of international commissions of the IMU (International Mathematical Union) and TWAS (Academy of Sciences for the Developing World).

He has been director of three workshops in his field at the ICTP (Abdus Salam International Centre for Theoretical Physics). In Brazil he is a recipient of the National Medal for Scientific Merit at the order of Grã-Cruz and a member of the Brazilian Research Group in Commutative Algebra and Algebraic Geometry (1997–2007).

At large he is a John Simon Guggenheim Fellow and has been awarded other fellowships from the Max Planck Institute, Japan Society for Promotion of Science, and the Istituto Nazionale di Alta Matematica. He is a member both of the Brazilian Academy of Sciences and the Academy of Sciences for the Developing World (Trieste, Italy).

His main research interests in mathematics include: main structures in commutative algebra; projective varieties in algebraic geometry; aspects of algebraic combinatorics; special graded algebras; foundations of Rees algebras; cremona and birational maps; algebraic vector fields; differential methods.

Simis is of Romanian origin, his parents immigrated to Brazil from Romania in the 1920s.
