= Carolina Araujo (mathematician) =

Brazilian mathematician

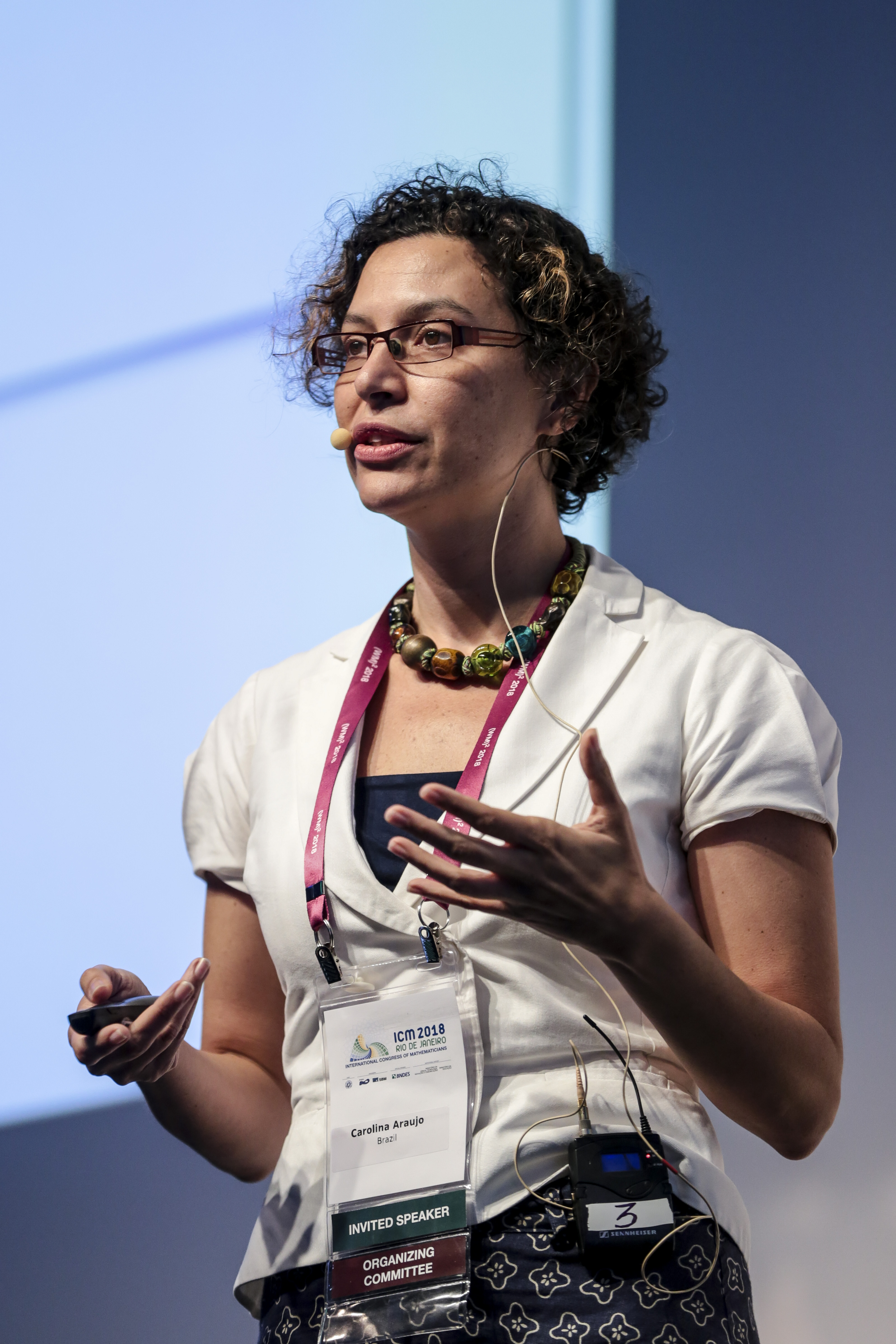
- Araujo at the ICM 2018
- Born: Carolina Bhering de Araujo; Rio de Janeiro, Brazil
- Education: Pontifical Catholic University of Rio de Janeiro (BSc); Princeton University (PhD)
- Known for: Algebraic geometry
- Awards: ICTP Ramanujan Prize (2020)
- Scientific career
- Fields: Mathematics
- Institutions: Instituto Nacional de Matemática Pura e Aplicada
- Thesis: The Variety of Tangents to Rational Curves (2004)
- Doctoral advisor: János Kollár

Carolina Bhering de Araujo (born in 1976) is a Brazilian mathematician specializing in algebraic geometry, including birational geometry, Fano varieties, and foliations. Other than her research in mathematics, she is also known for her efforts for improving the conditions for women mathematicians.

== Education and career ==
Araujo was born and raised in Rio de Janeiro, Brazil. She did her undergraduate studies in Brazil, completing a degree in mathematics in 1998 from the Pontifical Catholic University of Rio de Janeiro. She earned her PhD in 2004 at Princeton University, where her dissertation, supervised by János Kollár, was titled The Variety of Tangents to Rational Curves.

She is currently a researcher at the Instituto Nacional de Matemática Pura e Aplicada in Brazil (IMPA), and the only woman (as of 2018) on the permanent research staff at IMPA. She is also a Simons Associate at the Abdus Salam International Centre for Theoretical Physics (ICTP). She is the vice-president of the Committee for Women in Mathematics at the International Mathematical Union.

During and after her PhD, Araujo developed techniques related to Japanese mathematician Shigefumi Mori's proposed theory of rational curves of minimal degree, which she published in 2008.^{[A]}

== Recognition ==
Araujo won the L'Oreal Award for Women in Science in Brazil in 2008.

Araujo was both an organizer and an invited speaker at the 2018 International Congress of Mathematicians. She led the inaugural World Meeting for Women in Mathematics (WM)^{2} in August 2018. She was also one of the female mathematicians profiled in the short documentary called Journeys of Women in Mathematics, funded by the Simons Foundation.

Araujo was awarded the 2020 Ramanujan Prize from the International Centre for Theoretical Physics.

She is included in a deck of playing cards featuring notable women mathematicians published by the Association of Women in Mathematics.

== Selected bibliography ==
A.	Araujo, Carolina; Druel, Stéphane; Kovács, Sándor J. (2008), "Cohomological characterizations of projective spaces and hyperquadrics", Inventiones Mathematicae, 174 (2): 233–253, arXiv:0707.4310, Bibcode:2008InMat.174..233A, doi:10.1007/s00222-008-0130-1

B.	Araujo, Carolina; Corrêa, Maurício (2013), "On degeneracy schemes of maps of vector bundles and applications to holomorphic foliations", Mathematische Zeitschrift, 276 (1–2): 505–515, arXiv:1207.5009, doi:10.1007/s00209-013-1210-5

C.	Araujo, Carolina; Massarenti, Alex (2016), "Explicit log Fano structures on blow-ups of projective spaces", Proceedings of the London Mathematical Society, 113 (4): 445–473, arXiv:1505.02460, doi:10.1112/plms/pdw034

D.	Araujo, Carolina; Casagrande, Cinzia (2017), "On the Fano variety of linear spaces contained in two odd-dimensional quadrics", Geometry & Topology, 21 (5): 3009–3045, arXiv:1602.02372, doi:10.2140/gt.2017.21.3009, ISSN 1364-0380

E.	Araujo, Carolina; Corrêa, Mauricio; Massarenti, Alex (2018), "Codimension one Fano distributions on Fano manifolds", Communications in Contemporary Mathematics, 20 (5): 1750058, arXiv:1702.04751, doi:10.1142/s0219199717500584
