= Arnaldo Garcia =

Brazilian mathematician

Arnaldo Leite Pinto Garcia (born 1950) is a Brazilian mathematician working on algebraic geometry and coding theory. He is a titular researcher at the IMPA.

Garcia is a titular member of the Brazilian Academy of Sciences and has received Brazil's National Order of Scientific Merit.

He obtained his Ph.D. at the IMPA in 1980 under the guidance of Karl-Otto Stöhr.

== Selected writings ==
- A tower of Artin-Schreier extensions of function fields attaining the Drinfeld-Vladut bound
- On the asymptotic behaviour of some towers of function fields over finite fields
- On subfields of the Hermitian function field
- On maximal curves
