= Joaquim Gomes de Souza =

Brazilian mathematician

Joachim Gomes de Souza Souzinha
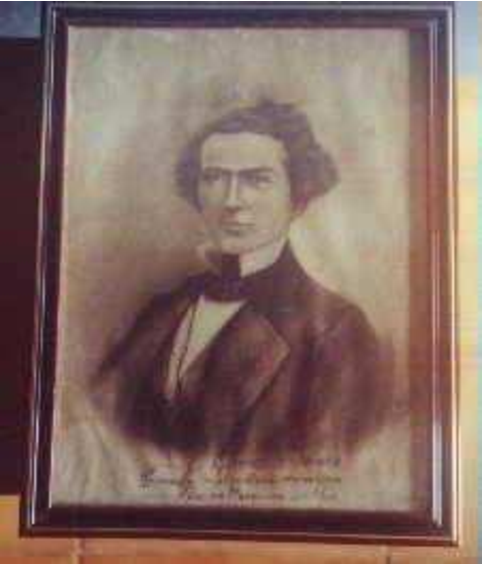

Joaquim Gomes de Souza "Souzinha" (15 February 1829, in Itapecuru Mirim – 1 June 1864, in London) was a Brazilian mathematician who worked on numerical analysis and differential equations. He was a pioneer on the study of mathematics in Brazil, and was described by José Leite Lopes as "the first great mathematician from Brazil".

In 1844, Gomes de Souza enrolled at the Faculdade de Medicina do Rio de Janeiro (now a part of the Federal University of Rio de Janeiro) to study medicine. He had a deep love for the natural sciences, which led him to also be interested in mathematics, and so he started to learn mathematics as a self-taught in parallel with his studies of medicine.

In 1848, he obtained his doctorate in mathematics from the Escola Real Militar, with the thesis Dissertação Sobre o Modo de Indagar novos Astros sem o Auxílio das Observações Directas (Dissertation about the means of investigating new celestial objects without the aid of direct observations).

He later went to the Sorbonne, in France, where he continued his mathematical studies. He was a personal friend of Cauchy, of whose classes he attended (in one of them, Souza spotted a mathematical mistake by Cauchy, he then asked his license and corrected it on the blackboard). In 1856, he obtained a doctorate in medicine from Paris Faculty of Medicine. In the same year, he presented his mathematical works at the Académie des sciences.

Souza held a paid public post in Brazil, and after much time in Europe, he was noticed he should return immediately to Brazil because he had been elected a member of the parliament. Souza had already married Rosa Edith in England and then had to return to Brazil without her.

In his book Mélanges de calcul intégral (1882), Souza aimed to obtain a general method to solve PDEs, according to Manfredo do Carmo: "[in his book] He [Souza] employed methods not entirely rigorous and it is not clear exactly how much of his work would remain if submitted to a careful scrutiny; as far as I know, it was never put to such a test."

He died at the age of 35, in London. The cause of death was a disease of the lung. C. S. Fernandez and C. M. Souza described his endeavorer in Europe: "He was audacious and fought with insistence for his scientific recognition in Europe. His effort was fruitless, though."

== Writings ==
- Resoluções das Equações Numéricas (1850, in Portuguese)
- Recuel de Memoires d’Analise Mathematiques (1857, in French)
- Anthologie universelle (1859, in French)
- Mélanges de calcul intégral (1882, posthumous, in French)
