= Marcos Dajczer =

Argentine-born Brazilian mathematician

Marcos Dajczer (born 19 November 1948, in Buenos Aires) is an Argentine-born Brazilian mathematician whose research concerns geometry and topology.

Dajczer obtained his Ph.D. from the Instituto Nacional de Matemática Pura e Aplicada in 1980 under the supervision of Manfredo do Carmo.

In 2006, he received Brazil's National Order of Scientific Merit honour for his work in mathematics. He was a Guggenheim Fellow in 1985.

Do Carmo–Dajczer theorem is named after his teacher and him.

== Selected publications ==
- do Carmo, M.; Dajczer, M. (1983) . "Rotation hypersurfaces in spaces of constant curvature", Transactions of the American Mathematical Society, Volume 277, Number 2, pp. 685–709.
- do Carmo, M.; Dajczer, M. (1982) . "Helicoidal surfaces with constant mean curvature", Tohoku Mathematical Journal Second Series, Volume 34, Number 3, pp. 425–435.
- Submanifolds and Isometric Immersions (1990, Mathematics Lecture Series) ISBN 9780914098225
