= Communications in Contemporary Mathematics =

- Discipline: Mathematics
- Language: English

Publication details
- History: 1999-present
- Publisher: World Scientific (Singapore)
- Impact factor: 1.154 (2010)

Standard abbreviations
- ISO 4: Commun. Contemp. Math.

Indexing
- ISSN: 0219-1997

Links
- Journal homepage

Communications in Contemporary Mathematics (CCM) is a journal published by World Scientific since 1999. It covers research in the fields such as applied mathematics, dynamical systems, mathematical physics, and topology.

== Abstracting and indexing ==
The journal is indexed in Zentralblatt MATH, Mathematical Reviews, ISI Alerting Services, CompuMath Citation Index, Current Contents/Physical, Chemical and Earth Sciences, and the Science Citation Index.
