= Ricardo Mañé =

Uruguayan mathematician

Ricardo Mañé Ramirez (Montevideo, 14 January 1948 – Montevideo, 9 March 1995) was a Uruguayan mathematician, known for his contributions to dynamical systems and ergodic theory. He was a doctoral student of Jacob Palis at IMPA.

He was an invited speaker at the International Congresses of Mathematicians of 1983 and 1994 and is a recipient of the 1994 TWAS Prize.

== Selected publications ==
- "Expansive diffeomorphisms", Proceedings of the Symposium on Dynamical Systems (University of Warwick, 1974) Lecture Notes in Mathematics Vol. 468 pp. 162–174, Springer-Verlag, 1975.
- "Persistent manifolds are normally hyperbolic", Transactions of the American Mathematical Society, Vol. 246, (Dec., 1978), pp. 261–283.
- "On the dimension of the compact invariant sets of certain non-linear maps", Springer, Lectures Notes in Mathematics Vol. 898 (1981) 230–242.
- "An ergodic closing lemma", Annals of Mathematics Second Series, Vol. 116, No. 3 (Nov., 1982), pp. 503–540.
- with P. Sad. and D. Sullivan: "On the dynamics of rational maps", Annales Scientifiques l'École Normale Supérieure, Vol. 16, Issue 2, pp. 193–217, 1983.
- "A proof of the C1 stability conjecture", Publications Mathématiques de l'IHÉS, Vol. 66, pp. 161–210, 1987
- "On the topological entropy of geodesic flows". Journal of Differential Geometry, Vol. 45 (1997), no. 1, pp. 74–93.
- Ergodic Theory and Differentiable Dynamics (1987, translated from Portuguese into English by Silvio Levy)
- Selected Works, Springer, 2017
