= Jay Meek =

American poet (1937–2007)

- Born: 1937
- Died: November 3, 2007 (aged 69–70); Saint Paul, Minnesota, U.S.
- Education: University of Michigan; Syracuse University
- Occupation: Poet
- Spouse: Martha George Meek (m. 1966)
- Children: 1

Jay Meek (1937 – November 3, 2007, St. Paul) was an American poet, and director of the Creative Writing program at the University of North Dakota. He was the poetry editor of the North Dakota Quarterly for many years.

He graduated from University of Michigan in 1959, and from Syracuse University with a master's degree in creative writing in 1963. He taught at Massachusetts Institute of Technology, Sarah Lawrence College, Wake Forest University, Memphis State University, Memorial University of Newfoundland, Colby College (Maine) and Syracuse University.

In 2005, he read his poetry at the Library of Congress.

He married Martha George Meek in 1966; they had a daughter, Anna George Meek, and granddaughter, Sarah Meek.

== Awards ==
- 1985 Guggenheim Fellowship
- National Endowment for the Arts Grants (Twice)
- Pushcart Prize
- Bush Foundation Artist Fellowship

== Works ==
- The week the dirigible came: poems, Carnegie Mellon University Press, 1976, ISBN 978-0-915604-06-7
- Drawing on the walls, Carnegie Mellon University Press, 1980, ISBN 9780915604319
- Earthly purposes, Carnegie Mellon University Press, 1984, ISBN 978-0-915604-94-4
- Stations: poems, Carnegie Mellon University Press, 1989, ISBN 978-0-88748-081-2
- Windows, Carnegie Mellon University Press, 1994
- Headlands: new and selected poems, Carnegie Mellon University Press, 1997, ISBN 978-0-88748-234-2
- Trains in winter, Carnegie-Mellon University Press, 2004, ISBN 978-0-88748-406-3
- The Memphis letters: a novel, Carnegie Mellon University Press, 2001, ISBN 978-0-88748-365-3

=== Anthologies ===
- "Sonny Liston", Perfect in their art: poems on boxing from Homer to Ali, Editors Robert Hedin, Michael Waters, SIU Press, 2003, ISBN 978-0-8093-2531-3
- "Visiting My Boyhood Friend after His Stroke", Line drives: 100 contemporary baseball poems, Editors Brooke Horvath, Tim Wiles, SIU Press, 2002, ISBN 978-0-8093-2440-8
- "The Week the Dirigible Came", The Zeppelin reader: stories, poems, and songs from the age of airships, Editor Robert Hedin, University of Iowa Press, 1998, ISBN 978-0-87745-629-2
