= Jacob Palis =

Brazilian mathematician (1940–2025)

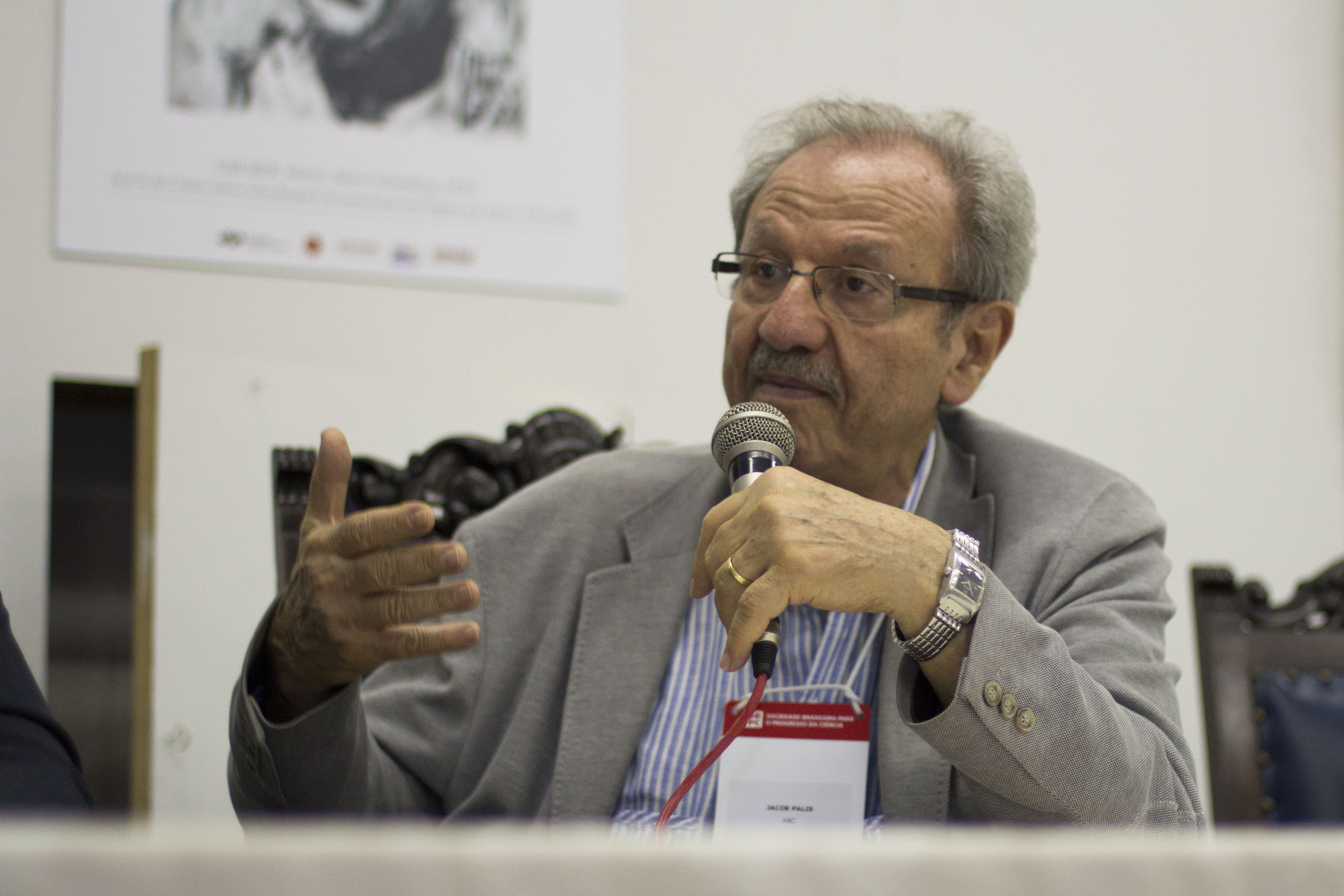
- Born: 15 March 1940; Uberaba, Minas Gerais, Brazil
- Died: 7 May 2025 (aged 85); Rio de Janeiro, Brazil
- Education: University of California, Berkeley; Federal University of Rio de Janeiro
- Known for: Dynamical systems Chaos theory Palis' conjectures
- Awards: Premio México de Ciencia y Tecnología (2000); Balzan Prize (2010); Abdus Salam Medal (2015)
- Scientific career
- Fields: Mathematics
- Workplaces: Instituto Nacional de Matemática Pura e Aplicada
- Doctoral advisor: Stephen Smale
- Doctoral students: Artur Oscar Lopes; Ricardo Mañé; Welington de Melo; Carlos Gustavo Moreira; Enrique Pujals; Marcelo Viana

Jacob Palis Jr. (15 March 1940 – 7 May 2025) was a Brazilian mathematician and academic. Palis's research interests were mainly dynamical systems and differential equations. Some themes are global stability and hyperbolicity, bifurcations, attractors and chaotic systems. He proposed the Palis' conjectures (which form the Palis' program), which influenced the development of the theory of dynamical systems, and also of its applications to other sciences. He was a world leader in chaos theory research. Palis was an influential figure in the development of mathematics in Brazil.

== Life and career ==
Jacob Palis was born in Uberaba, Minas Gerais. His father was a Lebanese immigrant, and his mother was of Syrian ancestry. The couple had eight children (five men and three women), and Jacob was the youngest. His father was a merchant, owner of a large store, and supported and funded the studies of his children. Palis said that he already enjoyed mathematics in his childhood.

At 16, Palis moved to Rio de Janeiro to study engineering at the University of Brazil – now UFRJ. He was approved in first place in the entrance exam, but was not old enough to enroll; he then had to take the university's entry exam again a year later, where he once again finished in first place. He graduated in 1962 with honours and received the award for the best student.

In 1964, he moved to the United States. In 1966, he obtained his master's degree in mathematics under the guidance of Stephen Smale at the University of California, Berkeley, and in 1968 his PhD, with the thesis On Morse-Smale Diffeomorphisms, again with Smale as advisor.

In 1968, he returned to Brazil and became a researcher at the Instituto Nacional de Matemática Pura e Aplicada (IMPA) in Rio de Janeiro, Brazil. Beginning in 1973 he held a permanent position as professor at IMPA, where he was director from 1993 until 2003. He was Secretary-General of the Third World Academy of Sciences from 2004 to 2006, and elected its president in 2006 and remained on position till December 2012. He was also president of the International Mathematical Union from 1999 to 2002. He was president of the Brazilian Academy of Sciences from 2007 to 2016. Palis advised more than forty PhD students so far from more than ten countries, including Artur Oscar Lopes, Ricardo Mañé, Welington de Melo, Carlos Gustavo Moreira, Enrique Pujals and Marcelo Viana.

Palis died at a hospital in Rio de Janeiro, on 7 May 2025, at the age of 85. He had been hospitalized since March.

== Awards and honors ==
Palis received numerous medals and decorations. He was a foreign member of several academies of sciences, including the United States National Academy of Sciences, the French Academy of Sciences and German Academy of Sciences Leopoldina. In 2005 Palis received the Legion of Honor.

He was a member of the Norwegian Academy of Science and Letters. In 2010, he was awarded the Balzan Prize for his fundamental contributions in the mathematical theory of dynamical systems that has been the basis for many applications in various scientific disciplines, such as in the study of oscillations. He was also a recipient of the 1988 TWAS Prize.

== Selected publications ==
- On Morse-Smale Dynamical Systems, Topology 19, 1969 (385–405). doi:10.1016/0040-9383(69)90024-X
- Structural Stability Theorems, with S. Smale, Proceedings of the Institute on Global Analysis, American Math. Society, Vol. XIV, 1970 (223–232).
- Cycles and Bifurcations Theory, with S. Newhouse, Asterisque 31, Société Mathématique de France, 1976 (44–140).
- The Topology of Holomorphic Flows near a Singularity, with C. Camacho and N. Kuiper, Publications Math.Institut Hautes Études Scientifiques 48, 1978 (5–38).
- Moduli of Stability and Bifurcation Theory, Proceedings of the International Congress of Mathematicians, Helsinki, 1978 (835–839).
- Stability of Parameterized Families of Gradient Vector Fields, with F. Takens, Annals of Mathematics 118, 1983 (383–421). doi:10.2307/2006976
- Cycles and Measure of Bifurcation Sets for Two-Dimensional Diffeomorphisms, with F. Takens, Inventiones Mathematicae 82, 1985 (397–422). doi:10.1007/BF01388862
- Homoclinic Orbits, Hyperbolic Dynamic and Fractional Dimensions of Cantor Sets (Lefschetz Centennial Conference) Contemporary Mathematics - American Mathematical Society, 58, 1987 (203–216).
- Hyperbolicity and Creation of Homoclinic Orbits, with F.Takens, Annals of Mathematics 125, 1987 (337–374). doi:10.2307/1971313
- On the C1 Omega-Stability Conjecture, Publications Math. Institut Hautes Études Scientifiques, 66, 1988 (210–215).
- Bifurcations and Global Stability of Two-Parameter Families of Gradient Vector Fields with M. J. Carneiro, Publications Math. Institut Hautes Études Scientifiques 70, 1990 (103–168).
- "Homoclinic Tangencies for Hyperbolic Sets of Large Hausdorff Dimension", with J. C. Yoccoz, Acta Mathematica 172, 1994, pp. 91–136.
- High Dimension Diffeomorphisms Displaying Infinitely Many Sinks, with M. Viana, Annals of Mathematics 140, 1994 (207–250). doi:10.2307/2118546
- A Global View of Dynamics and a Conjecture on the Denseness of Finitude of Attractors. Astérisque. France:, v. 261, pp. 339–351, 2000.
- Homoclinic tangencies and fractal invariants in arbitrary dimension, with C. Moreira and M. Viana, C R Ac Sc Paris., 2001. doi:10.1016/S0764-4442(01)02085-7
- Nonuniformily hyperbolic horseshoes unleashed by homoclinic bifurcations and zero density of attractors, with J.-C. Yoccoz, C R Ac Sc Paris., 2001.doi:10.1016/S0764-4442(01)02139-5

Books published

- Geometric Theory of Dynamical Systems, with W. de Melo. Springer-Verlag, 1982; also published in Portuguese, Russian and Chinese.
- Hyperbolicity and Sensitive-Chaotic Dynamics at Homoclinic Bifurcations, Fractal Dimensions and Infinitely Many Attractors, with F. Takens. Cambridge Univ. Press, 1993; Second Edition, 1994.
