= José Felipe Voloch =

Brazilian mathematician (born 1963)

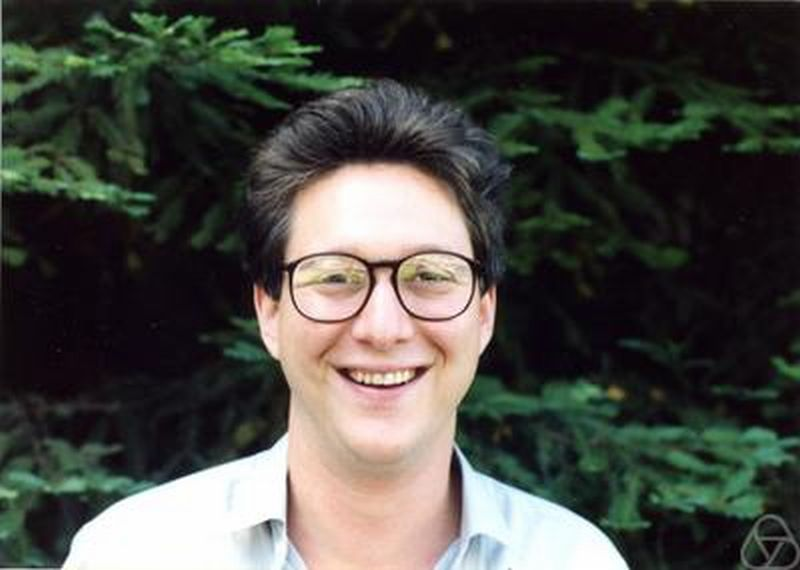
- Born: February 13, 1963 (age 62); Rio de Janeiro, Brazil
- Scientific career
- Fields: Mathematics

José Felipe Voloch (born 13 February 1963, in Rio de Janeiro) is a Brazilian mathematician who works on number theory and algebraic geometry. He has been a professor at the University of Canterbury since 2016.

== Career ==
Voloch earned his Ph.D. from the University of Cambridge in 1985 under the supervision of John William Scott Cassels. He was a professor at the University of Texas, Austin.

== Awards ==
He is a member of the Brazilian Academy of Sciences.

== Selected publications ==
- Coleman, Robert F.; Voloch, José Felipe (1992), "Companion forms and Kodaira-Spencer theory", Invent. Math., 110: 263–281, Bibcode:1992InMat.110..263C, doi:10.1007/bf01231333, MR 1185584, S2CID 121416817
