= Tony Mendoza (photographer) =

Cuban-American photographer (born 1941)

Antonio Mendoza (2007)

Tony Mendoza (born 1941) is a Cuban-American photographer.

== Life ==
He was born as Antonio Mendoza in Havana and moved to Miami with his family in 1960. He graduated from Yale with a Bachelor of Engineering and Harvard with a Master of Architecture, before becoming a full-time photographic artist in 1973. Married to Maria del Carmen from Esperanza, Cuba, and they have two children Alex and Lydia.

Mendoza taught in the photography department at the Ohio State University in Columbus, Ohio from 1988 until his retirement in 2013.

== Work and awards ==
His most famous book, Ernie, is a photographic memoir centered on a cat he encountered when he moved into an apartment in New York City. Mendoza has received three National Endowment for the Arts Fellowships, a Guggenheim Photography Fellowship as well as two Creative Writing fellowships from the Ohio Arts Council.

His photographs have featured in many major museums.

== Bibliography ==
- A Cuban Summer, 2013, (ISBN 978-1-59266-102-2)
- Ernie : a photographer's memoir, 1985, (ISBN 0-88496-240-7)
- Stories, 1987, (ISBN 0-87113-146-3)
- Dogs : a postcard book, 1995, (ISBN 0-88496-397-7)
- Cuba-- : going back, 1999, (ISBN 0-292-75232-6)
- Ernie : a photographer's memoir-expanded edition, 2001, (ISBN 978-0-8118-2963-2)
- Flowers, 2007, (ISBN 1-59005-170-X)
- Tony Mendoza : photographs, words, video, (written by Mendoza, edited by Louisa Bertch Green), 2003, (ISBN 0-918881-49-8)
