= Marc Galanter (law professor) =

American law professor (1931–2026)

- Born: February 18, 1931; Philadelphia, Pennsylvania
- Died: April 14, 2026 (aged 95); Madison, Wisconsin
- Occupation: Law professor

Academic background
- Education: University of Chicago (B.A., 1950; M.A., 1953; J.D., 1956)

Academic work
- Discipline: Law and society, Legal profession
- Institutions: University of Wisconsin Law School; London School of Economics and Political Science
- Notable works: "Why the 'haves' come out ahead: Speculations on the limits of legal change"

Marc Galanter (February 18, 1931 – April 14, 2026) was an American academic who was Professor of Law Emeritus at the University of Wisconsin Law School and Honorary Professor of Law at the National Law University Delhi. Previously he was the John and Rylla Bosshard Professor of Law and South Asian Studies at the University of Wisconsin-Madison and LSE Centennial Professor at the London School of Economics and Political Science. He taught South Asian Law, Law and Social Science, Legal Profession, Religion and the Law, Contracts, Dispute Processing and Negotiations. He authored numerous books and articles related to law, the legal profession and the provision of legal services in India.

Galanter was also an expert on the Bhopal disaster that occurred in Bhopal, India in 1984. His collection of court documents, newspaper clippings, secondary sources and photos forms the foundation of the "Bhopal: Law, Accidents, and Disasters in India" digital collection maintained by the University of Wisconsin Law School Library. The Bhopal digital archive contains thousands of documents, videos, a timeline and a bibliography of other works about the Bhopal disaster.

Galanter died on April 14, 2026, at the age of 95.

== Books ==
- Galanter, Marc, ed. (October 2006). Lowering the Bar (1st ed.). University of Wisconsin Press. ISBN 0-299-21350-1.
- Law and Society in Modern India, Oxford India Paperbacks.

== Sources ==
- UW Law bio
- Marc Galanter's Web site
