= Annals of Mathematics =

Academic journal in mathematics

- Discipline: Mathematics
- Language: English

Publication details
- Former name: The Analyst
- History: 1874–present
- Publisher: Princeton University and the Institute for Advanced Study (United States)
- Frequency: Bimonthly
- Open access: Delayed, after 5 years
- Impact factor: 5.7 (2023)

Standard abbreviations
- ISO 4: Ann. Math.
- MathSciNet: Ann. of Math.

Indexing
- CODEN: ANMAAH
- ISSN: 0003-486X
- LCCN: 49006640
- JSTOR: 0003486X
- OCLC no.: 01481391

Links
- Journal homepage

The Annals of Mathematics is a mathematical journal published every two months by Princeton University and the Institute for Advanced Study.

== History ==
The journal was established as The Analyst in 1874 and with Joel E. Hendricks as the founding editor-in-chief. It was "intended to afford a medium for the presentation and analysis of any and all questions of interest or importance in pure and applied Mathematics, embracing especially all new and interesting discoveries in theoretical and practical astronomy, mechanical philosophy, and engineering". It was published in Des Moines, Iowa, and was the earliest American mathematics journal to be published continuously for more than a year or two. This incarnation of the journal ceased publication after its tenth year, in 1883, giving as an explanation Hendricks' declining health, but Hendricks made arrangements to have it taken over by new management, and it was continued from March 1884 as the Annals of Mathematics. The new incarnation of the journal was edited by Ormond Stone at University of Virginia. It moved to Harvard in 1899 before reaching its current home in Princeton in 1911.

An important period for the journal was 1928–1958 with Solomon Lefschetz as editor. Norman Steenrod characterized Lefschetz' impact as editor as follows: "The importance to American mathematicians of a first-class journal is that it sets high standards for them to aim at. In this somewhat indirect manner, Lefschetz profoundly affected the development of mathematics in the United States."

Princeton University continued to publish the Annals on its own until 1933, when the Institute for Advanced Study took joint editorial control. Since 1998, it has been available in an electronic edition, alongside its regular print edition. The electronic edition was available without charge, as an open access journal, but since 2008, this is no longer the case. Issues from before 2003 were transferred to the non-free JSTOR archive, and articles are not freely available until 5 years after publication.

== Abstracting and indexing ==
The journal is abstracted and indexed in the Science Citation Index, Current Contents/Physical, Chemical & Earth Sciences, and Scopus. According to the Journal Citation Reports, the journal has a 2023 impact factor of 5.7, ranking it third out of 330 journals in the category "Mathematics".
