= Instituto Nacional de Matemática Pura e Aplicada =

Brazil's National Institute for mathematics

Coordinates: 22.965284°S 43.237939°W

Instituto de Matemática Pura e Aplicada
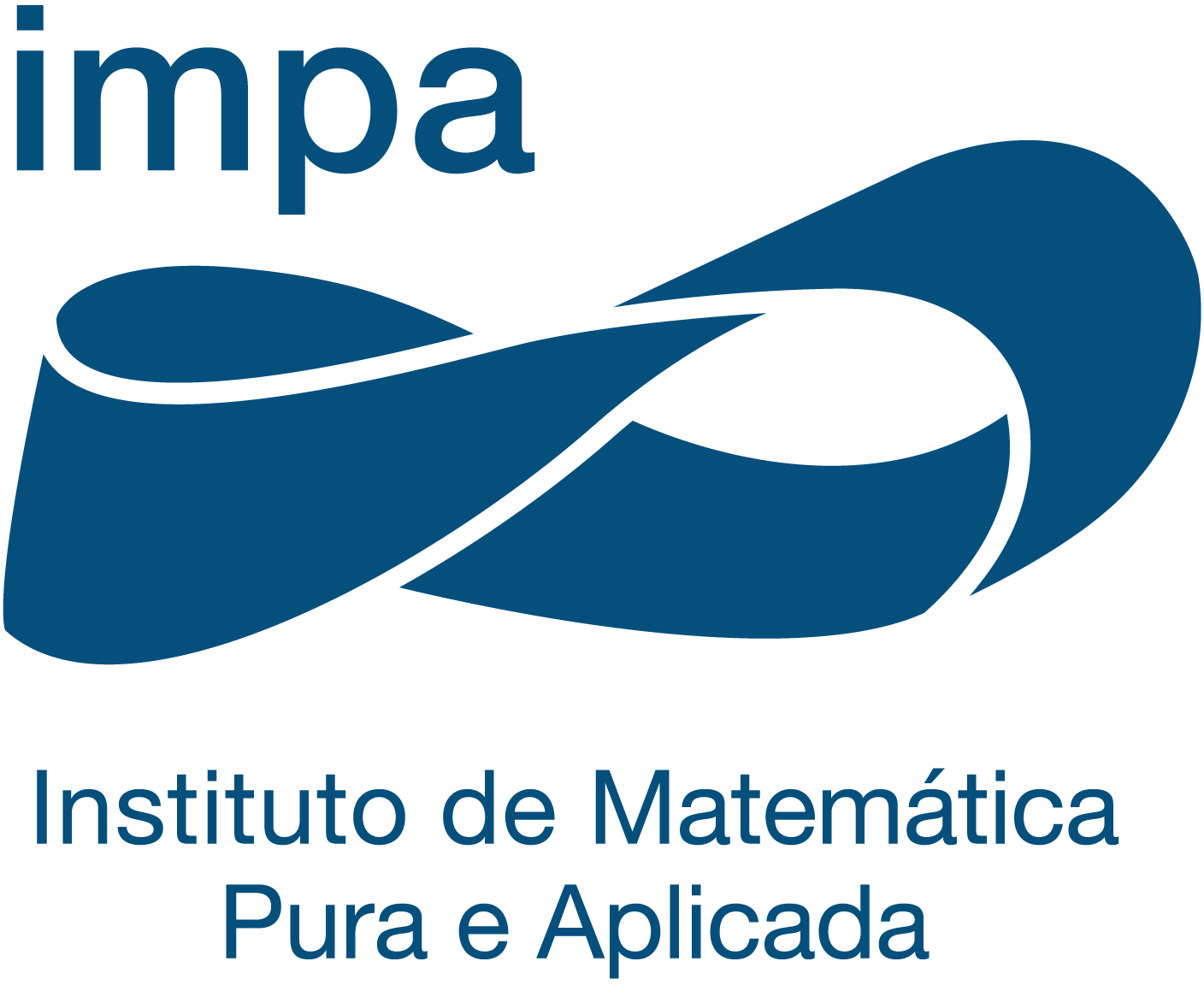
- Other names: IMPA
- Former names: Instituto de Matemática Pura e Aplicada
- Type: Public
- Established: 1952
- Budget: R$222 million
- Director: Marcelo Viana
- Academic staff: 130 faculty members and researchers (2018–2019)
- Students: 190 graduate students (2018–2019)
- Location: Rio de Janeiro, Brazil
- Campus: Urban
- Website: impa.br/en_US/

The Instituto Nacional de Matemática Pura e Aplicada (National Institute for Pure and Applied Mathematics) is considered to be the foremost research and educational institution of Brazil in the area of mathematics. It is located in the city of Rio de Janeiro, and was formerly known simply as Instituto de Matemática Pura e Aplicada (IMPA), whose abbreviation remains in use.

It is a research and education institution qualified as a Social Organization (SO) under the auspices of the Ministry of Science, Technology, Innovations and Communications (MCTIC) and the Ministry of Education (MEC) of Brazil. Currently located in the Jardim Botânico neighborhood (South Zone) of Rio de Janeiro. IMPA was founded on October 15, 1952. It was the first research unit of the National Research Council (CNPq), a federal funding agency created a year earlier. Its logo is a stylized Möbius strip, reproducing a large sculpture of a Möbius strip on display within the IMPA headquarters.

Founded by Lélio Gama, Leopoldo Nachbin and Maurício Peixoto, IMPA's primary mission is to stimulate scientific research, the training of new researchers and the dissemination and improvement of mathematical culture in Brazil. Mathematical knowledge is fundamental for scientific and technological development, which are indispensable components for economic, social and human progress. Since 2015, IMPA is directed by Marcelo Viana.

== Early history ==
At the time of creation in 1952 IMPA did not have its own headquarters, it was temporarily housed in a room in the headquarters of the Brazilian Center for Research in Physics, in Praia Vermelha, south zone of Rio de Janeiro. The scientific body was also diminutive, in addition to the director, astronomer Lélio Gama, who also headed the National Observatory, the institute counted with only two young mathematicians, Leopoldo Nachbin and Maurício Peixoto.

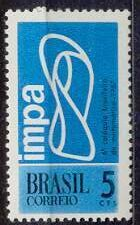
Postage stamp commemorating the 6th Brazilian Mathematics Colloquium, held at IMPA in 1967

Gama's performance at the helm of IMPA played a crucial role in the creation and consolidation of the young institute. And Nachbin and Peixoto would later be the first Brazilians invited to lecture at the International Congress of Mathematicians, one of the greatest distinctions in a mathematician's career. The academic prestige of IMPA grew from 1957, with the organization of the first Brazilian Colloquium of Mathematics, with about 50 participants. The Colloquium has been taking place every two years since then, in an uninterrupted fashion. In 1957 IMPA moved to Rua São Clemente, in Botafogo, also in the South Zone of Rio. In 1967, IMPA moved again to a historic building on Luiz de Camões street, in the center of Rio de Janeiro, which currently houses the Hélio Oiticica Cultural Center. In 1981 under the direction of Lindolpho de Carvalho Dias IMPA inaugurated its current headquarters in the neighborhood of Jardim Botânico.

== Development and social organization ==
In the 1970s, institutional changes in CNPq allowed for a qualitative leap and the expansion of IMPA's activities. A permanent body of researchers was formally created. Until then, researchers were either kept through scholarships or had occupations in other institutions.

In 1971, IMPA became the first mathematical institution in Brazil with a mandate from the Federal Council of Education to award master's and doctoral degrees. The novelty allowed the Master's and PhD program to become a permanent activity. Since then, IMPA's academic postgraduate program has always been awarded the highest grades by the Coordination for Improvement of Higher Level Staff (Capes).

On two occasions, Lindolpho de Carvalho Dias was temporarily replaced as the director by mathematician Elon Lages Lima, also elected director for the term 1989 – 1993. Lima put his vast academic reputation at the service of the cause of education. The High School Mathematics Teacher Improvement Program (PAPMEM), created in 1990, opened a new and important front for the institute.

Mathematician Jacob Palis was elected director in 1993. He would hold the position for ten years, a period of remarkable growth in IMPA's international prestige. During Jacob Palis' tenure, international prestige could be gauged by the fact that from 1991 to 1998 IMPA hosted the International Mathematical Union.

Another groundbreaking fact of its mandate was IMPA's qualification as a Social Organization (SO) in 2000. During this period, IMPA was formally transferred from CNPq to the Ministry of Science and Technology. The new model kept the institute in the public sphere, but gave it greater administrative flexibility, as well as more visibility and transparency in its activities.

IMPA's internationalization tendency was accentuated during the administration of mathematician César Camacho from 2004 to 2015, a period characterized by the renewal of IMPA's faculty membership, with the hiring of young researchers.

In 2005, the Brazilian Maths Olympiad for Public Schools (OBMEP) was created, an initiative of enormous social impact that strongly reaffirmed IMPA's commitment to the dissemination of mathematical knowledge. Held annually by IMPA with funds from the Ministry of Education (MEC) and the Ministry of Science, Technology, Innovations and Communications (MCTIC) and support from the Brazilian Mathematical Society (SBM), OBMEP counts on the participation of over 18 million students in practically all of Brazil's municipalities, almost the entire student population from the 6th grade to the end of high school. Since 2017, it is open to all Brazilian public and private schools.

In 2011, IMPA became a founding member of the network of higher education institutions that perform the Professional Master's in Mathematics (PROFMAT). This is a semi-presential postgraduate program aimed at training the basic education math teacher, coordinated by SBM with the support of IMPA.

== International cooperation ==
In 1995, IMPA hosted the international meeting that created the Mathematical Union for Latin America and the Caribbean. In 2011, it once again hosted the creation of an international mathematical organization: the Mathematical Council of the Americas.

In 2004, IMPA signed a contract with the Centre National de la Recherche Scientifique (CNRS), France's leading scientific funding agency. The agreement qualified IMPA as a Unité Mixte Internationale (UMI, International Joint Unit). This opened the possibility for the best French mathematicians to spend long-term periods at IMPA, at no cost to the institute. The contract has been renewed every four years.

From 2016, UMI was renamed after Jean-Christophe Yoccoz, the 1994 Fields Medalist, honorary researcher and long time collaborator and friend of IMPA.

In 2014, Brazilian mathematician Artur Avila, a researcher and former doctoral student at IMPA, won the Fields Medal, the most prestigious distinction in world mathematics. In the same year, IMPA was honored with the right to organize two major events in the world mathematical calendar: the 2017 International Mathematical Olympiad (IMO) and the 2018 International Congress of Mathematicians (ICM), both in Rio de Janeiro.

In 2016, following an initiative originated from IMPA, the Brazilian Parliament formally proclaimed the Mathematical Biennium (Law 13.358), which dedicated the years 2017 and 2018 to the cause of mathematics, marking the realization in the country of the IMO 2017 and the ICM 2018. The Mathematical Biennium period represented an enormous effort by IMPA to bring mathematics closer to the Brazilian society through initiatives such as the National Mathematics Festival, held in 2017.

In 2018, IMPA and SBM led Brazil's successful bid to join Group 5, the elite group of the International Mathematical Union, along with the other ten most advanced nations in the area. In that year, the cornerstone of IMPA's new campus was laid on land adjacent to the one the institute occupies in Jardim Botânico, donated four years earlier by private sponsors. The new campus will allow for the expansion of IMPA's activities and of its contribution to science and education in Brazil.

== Research areas ==
As of 2015, IMPA does research in algebra, analysis, differential geometry, partial differential equations, computer graphics, fluid dynamics, holomorphic dynamics, mathematical economics, symplectic geometry, algebraic geometry, optimization, probability theory, dynamical systems, and ergodic theory. They're aiming to expand the lines of research to include number theory, combinatorics, and discrete mathematics in general and its applications.

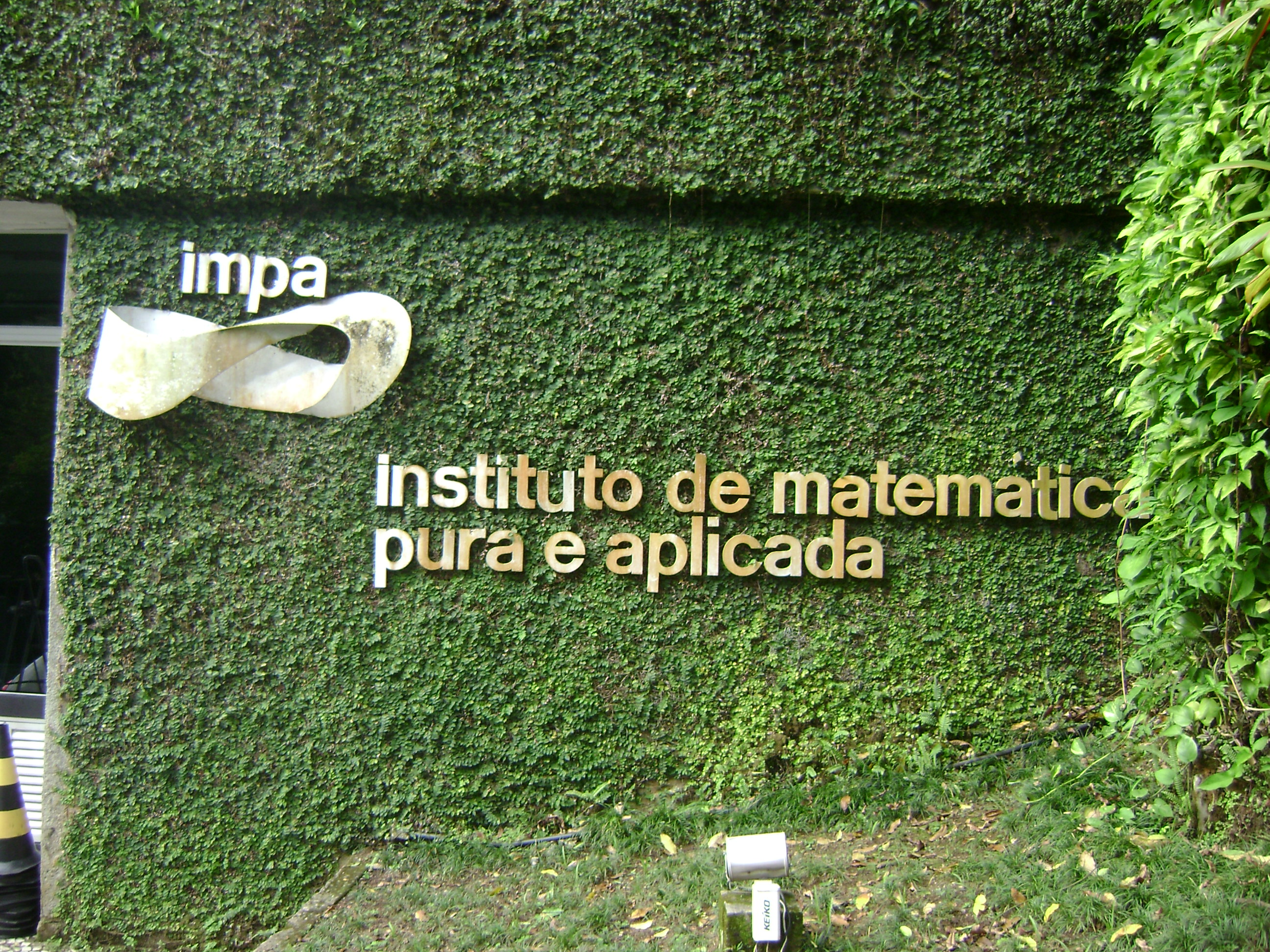
IMPA entrance

== People associated with IMPA ==
Artur Avila, a 2014 Fields Medalist, is a researcher at IMPA and received his Ph.D. there. Among its researchers also are/were Jacob Palis, Elon Lages Lima, Jean-Christophe Yoccoz, Stephen Smale, Maurício Peixoto, Manfredo do Carmo, Marcelo Viana, Welington de Melo, Enrique Pujals, Harold Rosenberg, Marcos Dajczer, Carlos Gustavo Moreira, Fernando Codá Marques, César Camacho, Arnaldo Garcia, Alfredo Noel Iusem, Karl-Otto Stöhr, Robert Morris, and Carolina Araujo.

Nº	Director	Period
1	Lélio Gama	1952–1966
2	Lindolpho de Carvalho Dias	1966–1969
3	Elon Lages Lima	1969–1971
4	Lindolpho de Carvalho Dias	1971–1978
5	Elon Lages Lima	1978–1979
6	Lindolpho de Carvalho Dias	1979–1989
7	Elon Lages Lima	1989–1993
8	Jacob Palis	1993–2003
9	César Camacho	2003–2015
10	Marcelo Viana	2015-

== See also ==
- People associated with IMPA
- Sociedade Brasileira de Matemática
- Pure mathematics
- Maria Laura Moura Mouzinho Leite Lopes
- Cândido Lima da Silva Dias
