= National Order of Scientific Merit =

Brazilian science and technology award

National Order of Scientific Merit Ordem Nacional do Mérito Científico
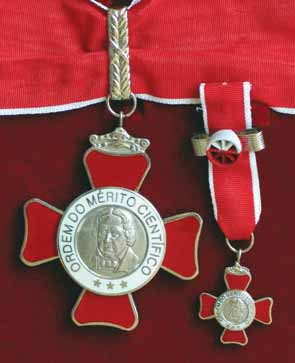
- Grand Cross of the Order Insignia of the Commander's Cross of the Order

Awarded by the Government of Brazil
- Type: National order
- Eligibility: Brazilian and foreign personalities
- Awarded for: scientific and technical contributions to the cause and development of science in Brazil
- Status: currently awarded
- Grades: Grand Cross (Grã-cruz) GCOMNC; Commander (Comendador) COMNC

Precedence
- Next (higher): National Order of Juridicial Merit
- Next (lower): Order of Cultural Merit
- Ribbon bar of the Grand Cross Ribbon bar of the Commander's Cross

The National Order of Scientific Merit (Portuguese: Ordem Nacional do Mérito Científico) is an honor bestowed upon Brazilian and foreign personalities recognized for their scientific and technical contributions to the cause and development of science in Brazil.

The award was instituted on March 16, 1993, by Decree no. 772, and then later updated on February 6, 2002, by Decree no. 4.115. The honors are given by either the Grand Master or Order Chancellor on June 13 of each year, which commemorates the birth of José Bonifácio de Andrada e Silva.
