= List of academic awards =

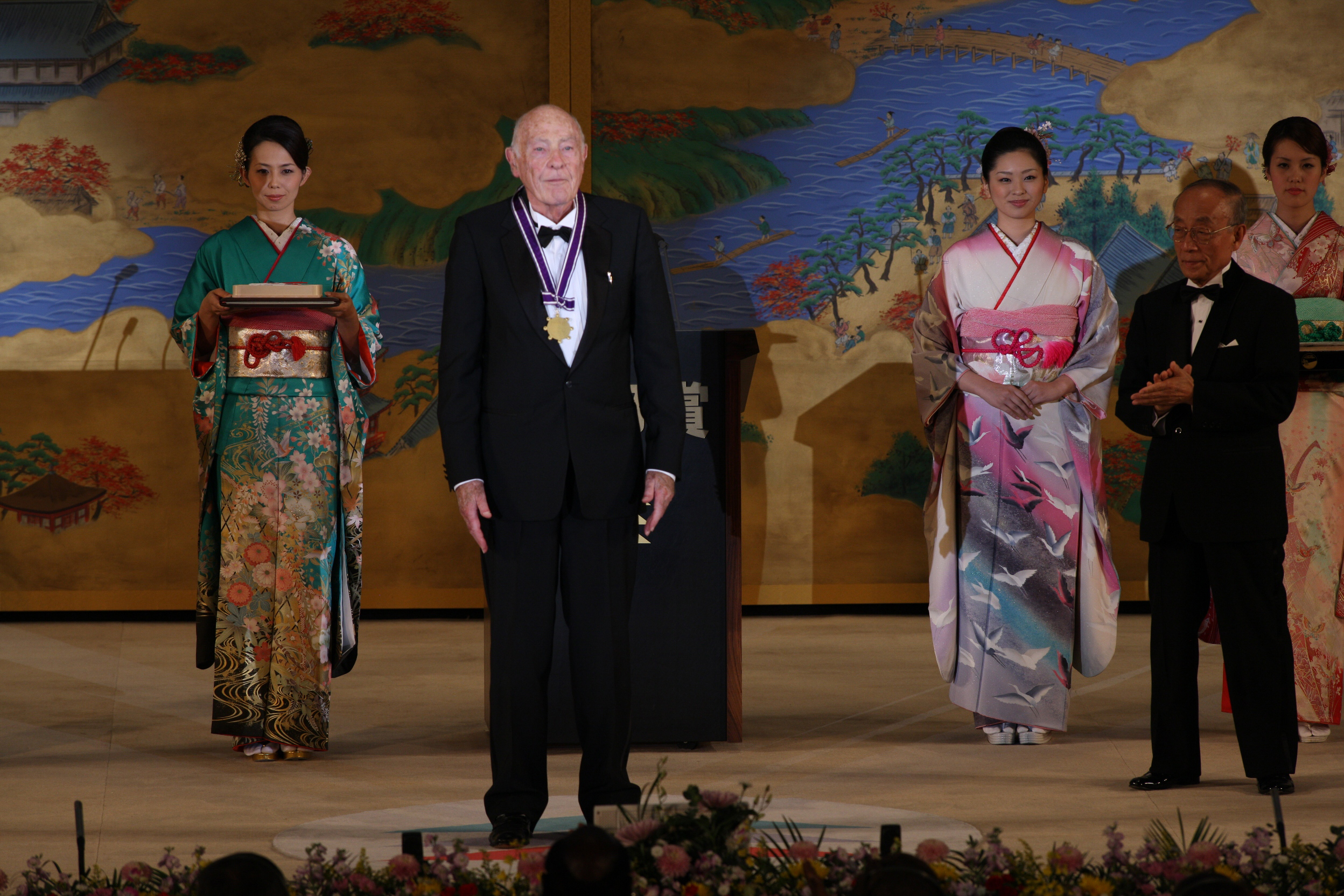
John W. Cahn of the National Institute of Standards and Technology receives the Kyoto Prize in 2011.

This list of academic awards is an index to articles about notable awards given for academic contributions. It does not include professorships, fellowships or student awards other than awards to students who have made an original contribution to an academic field. The country of the institution granting the award is given, but many awards are open to people from around the world.

== International ==
Country	Award	Sponsor	Description
International	Breakthrough Prize in Fundamental Physics	Breakthrough Prize	Transformative advances in fundamental physics
International	Breakthrough Prize in Life Sciences	Breakthrough Prize	Research aimed at curing intractable diseases and extending human life
International	Breakthrough Prize in Mathematics	Breakthrough Prize	Mathematics
International	Dijkstra Prize	Symposium on Principles of Distributed Computing, International Symposium on Distributed Computing	Outstanding papers on the principles of distributed computing
International	Ebbe Nielsen Challenge	Global Biodiversity Information Facility	Software or approaches that successfully address a GBIF-issued challenge in the field of biodiversity informatics
International	Ebbe Nielsen Prize	Global Biodiversity Information Facility	Substantial contributions to the field of biodiversity informatics
International	Fields Medal	International Mathematical Union	Outstanding contributions in mathematics attributed to young scientists. See also List of Fields Medal winners by university affiliation
International	Henri Poincaré Prize	International Association of Mathematical Physics	Outstanding contributions in mathematical physics, and contributions which lay the groundwork for novel developments in this broad field
International	ICTP Prize	International Centre for Theoretical Physics	Young physicist or mathematician from a developing country to promote theoretical mathematics and physics research in the developing world
International	Mustafa Prize	Organisation of Islamic Cooperation	Top researchers and scientists
International	Prize for Innovation in Distributed Computing	International Colloquium on Structural Information and Communication Complexity	Major contribution to understanding the relationships between information and efficiency in decentralized computing
International	The Panmure House Prize	Baillie Gifford	Academic prize for research into long-term investment and radical innovation
International	The Dan David Prize	Dan David Foundation	Prize for outstanding work in the study of the human past

== Africa ==
Country	Award	Sponsor	Description
Nigeria	Nigeria Prize for Science	Nigeria LNG	Excellence in science breakthroughs
South Africa	Havenga prize	Suid-Afrikaanse Akademie vir Wetenskap en Kuns	Original research in the sciences

== Americas ==
Country	Award	Sponsor	Description
Brazil	Prêmio Almirante Álavaro Alberto	National Council for Scientific and Technological Development	Brazilian researchers for their career's work advancing the progress of science, and knowledge transfer from academia to the productive sector
Canada	Chanchlani Global Health Research Award	McMaster University	Leading scholar in the area of Global Health
Canada	CNIB Chanchlani Global Vision Research Award	CNIB Foundation etc.	Vision scientists around the world who have made a major, original contribution for advancement in understanding the causes of blindness and vision loss, as well as potential cures, treatments and preventions
Canada	CPA Donald O. Hebb Award for Distinguished Contributions to Psychology as a Science	Canadian Psychological Association	Individual who has made a significant contribution to Canadian psychology as a scientific discipline (as a researcher, teacher, theorist, spokesperson, or public policy developer)
Canada	Dufferin Medal	Lord Dufferin	Canadian students and athletes who had achieved high excellence in academics and athletics
Canada	Fred P. Lossing Award	Canadian Society for Mass Spectrometry	Distinguished Canadian mass spectrometrist
Chile	Jorge Millas Award	Austral University of Chile	Academic merit
Mexico	Premio México de Ciencia y Tecnología	Consejo Nacional de Ciencia y Tecnología (Mexico)	Ibero-American scholars in recognition of advances in science and/or technology
United States and Canada	William Riley Parker Prize	Modern Language Association	Outstanding article published in PMLA, the association's primary journal
United States	Andrew Heiskell Award	Institute of International Education	Outstanding initiative conducted in international higher education by universities and colleges under IIE network
United States	Bailey Distinguished Member Award	The Clay Minerals Society	Scientific eminence in clay mineralogy (in its broadest sense) as evidenced by the publication of outstanding original scientific research and by the impact of this research on the clay sciences
United States	Banting Medal	American Diabetes Association	Original, sustained and reproducible scholarship that has made major contributions to the understanding of diabetes, its treatment and/or prevention
United States	Berggruen Prize	Berggruen Institute	Thinkers whose ideas have helped us find direction, wisdom, and improved self-understanding in a world being rapidly transformed by profound social, technological, political, cultural, and economic change
United States	Biemann Medal	American Society for Mass Spectrometry	An individual early in his or her career in recognition of significant achievement in basic or applied mass spectrometry
United States	Charles E. Merriam Award for Outstanding Public Policy Research	University of Illinois at Urbana–Champaign	Outstanding public policy research
United States	Clark Kerr Award	University of California, Berkeley	Extraordinary and distinguished contribution to the advancement of higher education
United States	Clay Research Award	Clay Mathematics Institute	To mathematicians to recognize their achievement in mathematical research
United States	James L. Clifford Award	American Society for Eighteenth-Century Studies	Best article in eighteenth-century studies.
United States	Cornplanter Medal	Cayuga County Historical Society	Scholastic and other contributions to the betterment of knowledge of the Iroquois people
United States	Edwin H. Land Medal	The Optical Society, Society for Imaging Science and Technology	Pioneering work empowered by scientific research to create inventions, technologies, and products in optics and imaging
United States	Feynman Prize in Nanotechnology	Foresight Institute	Significant advances in nanotechnology
United States	Frank Prize	University of Florida	Research that advances public interest communications around positive social change, including issues such as education, health, politics, and the environment
United States	George L. Mosse Prize	American Historical Association	Outstanding major work of extraordinary scholarly distinction, creativity, and originality in the intellectual and cultural history of Europe since 1500
United States	Gildersleeve Prize	Johns Hopkins University Press	Best article of the year published in the American Journal of Philology
United States	Louis J. Gottschalk Prize	American Society for Eighteenth-Century Studies	Best book in the field of eighteenth-century studies.
United States	Haskins Medal	Medieval Academy of America	Distinguished book in the field of medieval studies
United States	Hattendorf Prize	Naval War College	Distinguished academic achievement in publishing original research that contributes to a deeper historical understanding of the broad context and interrelationships involved in the roles, contributions, limitations, and uses of the sea services in history
United States	Heroes of Chemistry	American Chemical Society	Teams responsible for creation of innovative and impactful products based on chemistry and chemical engineering
United States	Howard R. Marraro Prize	Modern Language Association	Scholarly work on Italian literature or comparative Italian literature
United States	IEEE Edison Medal	Institute of Electrical and Electronics Engineers	Meritorious achievement in electrical science, electrical engineering or the electrical arts
United States	IEEE Medal of Honor	Institute of Electrical and Electronics Engineers	Exceptional contribution or an extraordinary career in the IEEE fields of interest
United States	IJCAI Computers and Thought Award	International Joint Conference on Artificial Intelligence	Outstanding young scientists in artificial intelligence
United States	ISCB Fellow	International Society for Computational Biology	Outstanding contributions to the fields of computational biology and bioinformatics
United States	J. C. Harrington Award	Society for Historical Archaeology	Life-time of contributions to the discipline centered on scholarship
United States	J. Russell Major Prize	American Historical Association	Book by a historian
United States	James Russell Lowell Prize	Modern Language Association	Outstanding literary or linguistic study, a critical edition of an important work, or a critical biography
United States	John Addison Porter Prize	Yale University	Scholarship in any field where it is possible, through original effort, to gather and relate facts or principles, or both, and to present the results in such a literary form as to make the product of general human interest
United States	Kenneth Harwood Outstanding Dissertation Award	Broadcast Education Association	Best doctoral dissertation in field of broadcasting and electronic media
United States	Kenneth W. Mildenberger Prize	Modern Language Association	Language translator
United States	Larry Sandler Memorial Award	Drosophila Research Conference	Best dissertation of the preceding year
United States	Leonard D. White Award	University of Chicago	Best dissertation in the field of public administration
United States	MIT150	The Boston Globe	The most significant innovators, inventions, or ideas from MIT, MIT alumni, and other MIT-related people and organizations
United States	Massry Prize	Meira and Shaul G. Massry Foundation	Substantial recent contributions in the biomedical sciences
United States	Matei Calinescu Prize	Modern Language Association	Distinguished work of scholarship in twentieth- or twenty-first-century literature and thought
United States	McClintock Prize	Maize Genetics Executive Committee	Study of plant genome structure, function and evolution, including the analysis of gene regulation and epigenetics
United States	Member of the National Academy of Sciences	National Academy of Sciences	Distinguished and continuing achievements in original research
United States	Michael Brin Prize in Dynamical Systems	University of Maryland, College Park etc.	Outstanding work in the theory of dynamical systems and related areas
United States	Miriam Braverman Memorial Prize	Progressive Librarians Guild	Best graduate student paper about some aspect of the social responsibilities of librarians, libraries, or librarianship
United States	Morton N. Cohen Award	Modern Language Association	Important collections of letters
United States	Niels Lassen Award	International Society for Cerebral Blood Flow and Metabolism	Outstanding scientific contribution made by an early career scientist
United States	PROSE Awards	Association of American Publishers	Best in professional and scholarly publishing
United States	Paul Birdsall Prize	American Historical Association	Book in English by a historian. Preference given to early-career academics.
United States	Phyllis Franklin Award	Modern Language Association	Person who has fostered public support for the humanities through speaking, writing, policy making, or other activities
United States	Pioneer Award in Nanotechnology	Institute of Electrical and Electronics Engineers	Individuals who by virtue of initiating new areas of research, development or engineering have had a significant impact on the field of nanotechnology
United States	Rowman & Littlefield Award in Innovative Teaching	American Political Science Association	Developers of effective new approaches to teaching among political scientists
United States	Ruth Shonle Cavan Young Scholar Award	American Society of Criminology	Researcher who has made outstanding contributions to the discipline of criminology, and who has received his or her Ph.D., M.D., or other graduate degree no more than five years before receiving the award
United States	SIAM Fellow	Society for Industrial and Applied Mathematics	SIAM members who are recognized by their peers as distinguished for their contributions to the discipline
United States	SIGCSE Award for Lifetime Service to the Computer Science Education Community	Association for Computing Machinery: SIGCSE	Lifetime contributions to computer science education
United States	SIGCSE Award for Outstanding Contribution to Computer Science Education	Association for Computing Machinery: SIGCSE	Significant contribution to computer science education
United States	Silvert Award	Latin American Studies Association	Senior members of the profession who have made distinguished lifetime contributions to the study of Latin America
United States	Stefan Bergman Prize	American Mathematical Society	Mathematical research in the theory of the kernel function and its applications in real and complex analysis; or function-theoretic methods in the theory of partial differential equations of elliptic type with attention to Bergman's operator method.
United States	Troland Research Awards	National Academy of Sciences	Psychological research on the relationship between consciousness and the physical world
United States	Wesley Logan Prize	Association for the Study of African American Life and History	Outstanding book in African diaspora history
United States	Wilbur Cross Medal	Yale Graduate School Alumni Association	Distinguished achievements in scholarship, teaching, academic administration, and public service
United States	William Gilbert Award	American Geophysical Union	Outstanding and unselfish work in magnetism of Earth materials and of the Earth and planets

== Asia ==
Country	Award	Sponsor	Description
Hong Kong	Yidan Prize	Yidan Prize Foundation	Two individuals or organizations whose work has made contributions to education research and development
India	Faculty Research Awards	Careers360, Minister of Human Resource Development	Academic and research output in Scopus indexed journals, citation index and h-index
India	VASVIK Industrial Research Award	Vividhlaxi Audyogik Samshodhan Vikas Kendra (VASVIK)	Excellence in industrial research in the areas of science and technology
Japan	Asahi Prize	Asahi Shimbun	Achievement in science or arts that has made a great contribution to culture or society
Japan	Fukuoka Prize	Fukuoka City International Foundation	Outstanding individuals or groups/organizations in preserving and creating the unique and diverse cultures of Asia
Japan	Hideyo Noguchi Africa Prize	Japan International Cooperation Agency	Outstanding achievements in the fields of medical research and medical services to combat infectious and other diseases in Africa
Japan	International Prize for Biology	Japan Society for the Promotion of Science	Outstanding contribution to the advancement of research in fundamental biology
Japan	Japan Prize	Japan Prize Foundation	Original and outstanding achievements in science and technology that are recognized as having advanced the frontiers of knowledge and having served the cause of peace and prosperity for mankind
Japan	Kyoto Prize	Inamori Foundation	Kyoto Prize in Advanced Technology; Kyoto Prize in Arts and Philosophy; Kyoto Prize in Basic Sciences
Japan	Nishina Memorial Prize	Nishina Memorial Foundation	Young scientists who have made substantial contributions in the field of atomic and sub-atomic physics research
Japan	Praemium Imperiale	Fujisankei Communications Group	Outstanding contributions to the development, promotion and progress of the arts
Taiwan	Tang Prize	Tang Prize Foundation	Outstanding contributions in sustainable development, biopharmaceutical science, sinology, and rule of law
Thailand	Dushdi Mala Medal	Monarch of Thailand	Distinguished services in the domains of the arts and sciences

== Europe ==
Country	Award	Sponsor	Description
Austria	Francis Stephen Award	Österreichische Gesellschaft zur Erforschung des 18. Jahrhunderts	Researchers in the humanities and social sciences
Denmark	Rigmor and Carl Holst-Knudsen Award for Scientific Research	Aarhus University	Mark of respect to a researcher who has produced one or more significant results which show promise in future research
Europe	Member of the Academia Europaea	Academia Europaea	Sustained academic excellence
Europe	Schwäbisch Gmünd Prize	European Academy of Surface Technology	Early career researcher active in Europe on the grounds of originality, creativity and excellence in surface technology
Europe	Stein Rokkan Prize for Comparative Social Science Research	International Science Council, University of Bergen, European Consortium for Political Research	Substantial and original contribution in comparative social science research
France	Prix Giles	Académie des Inscriptions et Belles-Lettres	Work related to China, Japan or East Asia that was published by a French author
France	Prix Napoleon	Fondation Napoléon	Best non-Francophone historical work on the First Napoleonic Empire
France	Prix Stanislas Julien	Académie des Inscriptions et Belles-Lettres	Sinological work (usually) published in the previous year
France	Social Choice and Welfare Prize	Society for Social Choice and Welfare	Young scholars, under the age of 40, in the areas of social choice theory and welfare economics
Germany / United Kingdom	Feldberg Foundation Prize	Feldberg Foundation	Experimental medical research, in particular in physiology, pharmacology and related topics
Germany	Carl Friedrich Gauss Prize	International Mathematical Union, German Mathematical Society	Outstanding mathematical contributions that have found significant applications outside of mathematics
Germany	Ludwig Prandtl Ring	Deutsche Gesellschaft für Luft- und Raumfahrt	Outstanding contribution in the field of aerospace engineering
Germany	Otto Hahn Medal	Max Planck Society	Outstanding scientific achievement by junior scientists
Germany	Prize for Military History	Federal Ministry of Defence	Achievements in the fields of military history and history of military technology
Germany	Richard von Mises Prize	Gesellschaft für Angewandte Mathematik und Mechanik	Outstanding scientific achievements in the field of Applied Mathematics and Mechanics
Ireland	Cunningham Medal	Royal Irish Academy	Outstanding contributions to scholarship and the objectives of the Academy
Italy	ENI award	Eni	Outstanding contributions in new frontiers in hydrocarbons, renewable and non-conventional energy, protection of the environment
Netherlands	Multatuli Prize	Amsterdam Fund for the Arts	Exemplary writing in the Dutch language
Norway	Abel Prize	King of Norway	Outstanding scientific work in the field of mathematics
Norway	Gunnerus Medal	Royal Norwegian Society of Sciences and Letters	Outstanding technical-scientific or other scientific work or benefits to the Science Society
Norway	Onsager Medal	Norwegian University of Science and Technology	Researchers in one or more subject areas of chemistry, physics or mathematics
Norway	Sverdrup Prize	Norwegian Statistical Association	Eminent representative of the statistics profession; younger statistician who has authored or coauthored a high quality journal article
Spain	Fonseca Prize	University of Santiago de Compostela	Popularization of science
Spain	Menéndez Pelayo International Prize	Menéndez Pelayo International University	Persons whose literary or scientific work has a humanistic orientation and application, in the tradition of the University's namesake Marcelino Menéndez y Pelayo
Spain	Princess of Asturias Awards	Princess of Asturias Foundation	Individuals, entities or organizations from around the world who make notable achievements in the sciences, humanities, and public affairs
Sweden / Norway	Nobel Prize	Nobel Assembly at the Karolinska Institute etc.	Outstanding contributions for humanity in chemistry, literature, peace, physics, and physiology or medicine
Sweden	Börje Langefors Best Doctoral Dissertation Award	Swedish Information Systems Academy	Best doctoral dissertation in Sweden in the subject areas - informatics, information systems, data and information science or equivalent
Switzerland	Balzan Prize	International Balzan Prize Foundation	People or organizations who have made outstanding achievements in the fields of humanities, natural sciences, culture, as well as for endeavours for peace and the brotherhood of man
Switzerland	Rössler Prize	ETH Zurich Foundation	Outstanding scientific work
United Kingdom	Aston Medal	British Mass Spectrometry Society	outstanding contributions to our understanding of the biological, chemical, engineering, mathematical, medical, or physical sciences relating directly to mass spectrometry
United Kingdom	Awards of the British Academy	British Academy	18 awards and medals to recognise achievement in the humanities and social sciences
United Kingdom	British Academy Medal	British Academy	Outstanding achievement that has transformed understanding of a particular subject or field of study in ... any branch of the humanities and social sciences
United Kingdom	Burkitt Medal	British Academy	Special service to Biblical Studies
United Kingdom	Derek Allen Prize	British Academy	Outstanding scholarly achievement in numismatics, Celtic studies and musicology
United Kingdom	European Medal for Bio-Inorganic Chemistry	Royal Society of Chemistry	Excellence and Impact in the field of Bioinorganic chemistry
United Kingdom	Grahame Clark Medal	British Academy	Academic achievement involving recent contributions to the study of prehistoric archaeology
United Kingdom	IET Faraday Medal	Institution of Engineering and Technology	Notable scientific or industrial achievement in engineering or conspicuous service rendered to the advancement of science, engineering and technology or lifetime achievement in science, engineering or technology
United Kingdom	Imbert Prize	Association of Security Consultants	Development of ideas for the advancement of risk and security management in the UK
United Kingdom	Joan Mott Prize Lecture	The Physiological Society	Physiology
United Kingdom	Kenyon Medal	British Academy	Work in the field of classical studies and archaeology
United Kingdom	Leslie Fox Prize for Numerical Analysis	Institute of Mathematics and its Applications	Young numerical analysts worldwide
United Kingdom	Leverhulme Medal (British Academy)	British Academy	Significant contribution to knowledge and understanding in a field within the humanities and social sciences
United Kingdom	Makdougall Brisbane Prize	Royal Society of Edinburgh	Distinction in the promotion of scientific research
United Kingdom	Philip Leverhulme Prize	Leverhulme Trust	Outstanding researchers. Up to thirty awards across a range of academic disciplines
United Kingdom	Physiological Society Annual Review Prize Lecture	The Physiological Society	Outstanding contributions to physiology
United Kingdom	President's Medal	British Academy	Outstanding service to the cause of the humanities and social sciences
United Kingdom	Turing Lecture	British Computer Society, Institution of Engineering and Technology	Lecture given by a noted speaker on the subject of Computer Science
United Kingdom	Young Economist of the Year	Royal Economic Society, Financial Times	1500-word short research paper on one of the economics topics announced by the host

== Oceania ==
Country	Award	Sponsor	Description
Australia	Fenner Medal	Australian Academy of Science	Distinguished research in biology
Australia	Clarke Medal	Royal Society of New South Wales	Distinguished work in the natural sciences
Australia	Endeavour Awards	Government of Australia	Merit-based scholarship programme
Australia	Max Crawford Medal	Australian Academy of the Humanities	Outstanding achievement in the humanities by young Australian scholars currently engaged in research, and whose publications contribute towards an understanding of their discipline by the general public

== Middle-east ==
Country	Award	Sponsor	Description
Iran	Academic Achievement Awards	Association of Professors and Scholars of Iranian Heritage (APSIH)	The annual graduation ceremony honors the academic achievements of students of Iranian heritage who will be graduating in that academic year
Iran	Khwarizmi International Award	Iranian Research Organization for Science and Technology (IROST)	The Khwarizmi International Award is a research award given annually by the President of Iran. The awardees, 10 senior researchers and 10 young researchers, are selected by the Iranian Research Organization for Science and Technology (IROST). It honors “individuals who have made outstanding achievements in research, innovation and invention, in fields related to science and technology”.
Iran	Young Scientist Award	Iran’s National Elites Foundation and Jamili Science and Technology Foundation	YSF has been annually held since 2017 to support the conversion of new ideas into business/products, support scholars, and strengthen the innovational and entrepreneurial spirit in young scientists. The festival is held in five areas of basic sciences (Chemistry, Physics, Mathematics & Computer Science, Biology, and Geology). YSF is held in two sections: Idea Section and Start-up Section. The primary objectives of YSF are supporting scholars in the fields of basic sciences, encouraging young inventors, innovators, researchers, and start-ups, creating a platform for scientific and technological cooperation between academia and industry, and creating opportunities and networks for the future of young scientists.
Turkey	Türkiye Scholarships	Government of Turkey	Türkiye Scholarships offers many different scholarship programs, including undergraduate, graduate and PhD scholarships, special scholarship programs such as success scholarship, art scholarships, and joint scholarship programs with prestigious international organizations. The scholarship covers tuition fee, monthly stipend, accommodation, health insurance, and a round-trip flight ticket.

== See also ==
- Lists of awards
- List of education awards
- List of student awards
- Teacher award
