= Nils Lid Hjort =

Norwegian statistician

Nils Lid Hjort (born 12 January 1953) is a Norwegian statistician, who has been a professor of mathematical statistics at the University of Oslo since 1991. Hjort's research themes are varied, with particularly noteworthy contributions in the fields of Bayesian probability (Beta processes for use in non- and semi-parametric models, particularly within survival analysis and event history analysis, but also with links to Indian buffet processes in machine learning), density estimation and nonparametric regression (local likelihood methodology), model selection (focused information criteria and model averaging), confidence distributions, and change detection. He has also worked with spatial statistics, statistics of remote sensing, pattern recognition, etc.

An article on frequentist model averaging, with co-author Gerda Claeskens, was selected as Fast Breaking Paper in the field of mathematics by the Essential Science Indicators in 2005. This and a companion paper, both published in Journal of the American Statistical Association in 2003, introduced focused information criteria, along with a clear large-sample analysis of subset and post-selection estimators.

Hjort has been a core member of the Centre of Excellence Centre for Ecological and Evolutionary Synthesis, on the scientific advisory board of the Centre for Innovation Statistics for Innovation, and has also been involved with the Centre for Biostatistical Modelling in the Medical Sciences, all within the University of Oslo.

Hjort is an elected member of the Norwegian Academy of Science and Letters since 1999, the Royal Norwegian Society of Sciences and Letters since 2016, and was the third recipient of the Sverdrup Prize, awarded by the Norwegian Statistical Association in 2013. He was also the first recipient of the Ludwig von Drake Award.

He has also served on the editorial boards on various journals dedicated to the methodology and application of statistical research, including the Scandinavian Journal of Statistics, Journal of the Royal Statistical Society, Series B, and the Annals of Statistics, and has been on the programme committees of numerous international conferences. He has led the 2014–2019 Research Council of Norway funded project FocuStat: Focus Driven Statistical Inference With Complex Data at the University of Oslo, and is co-leading the 2022–2023 project Stability and Change at the Centre for Advanced Study at the Norwegian Academy of Science and Letters.

Over the years, Hjort has supervised or co-supervised about 40 Master's degree students and about 15 PhDs. Among these are Steffen Grønneberg and Céline Cunen, both winners of the Sverdrup Young Researcher Prize, Martin Jullum and Ingrid Dæhlen, both winners of the Norwegian Computing Centre Master's Prize.

On the applied side, Hjort demonstrated in 1994 that there is a small but Olympically significant difference between inner-lane and outer-lane starts for 500 m speedskating races, after a systematic analysis of world sprint championships data, implying that the Olympic 500 m event has been unfair since 1924. As a result of Hjort's work and initiative, the International Skating Union and the International Olympic Committee changed the rules; since Nagano 1998 onwards, the sprint skaters race the 500 m twice, with one start in inner lane and one start in the outer lane. He has also been a regular contributor to the Speedskating World magazine. Other applied work has involved analysis of literary texts. In the famous case of potential plagiarism where Aleksandr Solzhenitsyn and others accused Mikhail Sholokhov of not being the rightful author of And Quiet Flows the Don, Hjort's analysis gives full support to Sholokhov. Since 2020, Hjort and fellow statisticians have collaborated with peace-and-conflict and political science researchers, from Peace Research Institute Oslo and elsewhere, to study the quantitative mechanics of conflicts, analyse and predict conflict levels, etc.

Hjort's other interests include Disney comics (where he has given public lectures and written scholarly articles for various publishers), chamber music and choir singing (taking part in more than ten CD recordings with Grex Vocalis), gøbbing (exchanging ideas with members of a think tank), and cross-country skiing. He has edited two books with the works of notable Disney comics artist Don Rosa.

Nils Lid Hjort is one of five sons of Supreme Court lawyer Johan Hjort and Helga Lid, and his grandfathers were Supreme Court lawyer Johan Bernhard Hjort and ethnologist Nils Lid. Among his brothers is typographer, designer and rock music historian Christopher Hjort, and his cousins include writer and publisher Anders Heger, mayor of Tromsø Jens Johan Hjort, violinist and conductor Gottfried von der Goltz, and cellist Kristin von der Goltz.
