= Tjøstheim =

Tjøstheim is a surname. Notable people with the surname include:

- Bjarte Tjøstheim (born 1967), Norwegian comedian, radio host and actor
- Dag Tjøstheim (born 1945), Norwegian statistician

== Other ==
- Tjøstheim's coefficient, Measure of spatial correlation
