= The Security Institute =

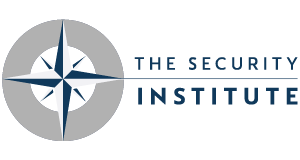
- Abbreviation: SyI
- Formation: 1999
- Type: Non-governmental organisation
- Legal status: Limited Company registered in England and Wales
- Headquarters: Nuneaton, Warwickshire, Warks., United Kingdom
- Coordinates: 52°33′01″N 1°28′58″W
- Region served: United Kingdom, Worldwide
- Members: ca 5,000
- Official language: English
- Chief Executive Officer: Sarah Austerberry (MLitt CSyP FSyI)
- Royal Patron: HRH Anne, Princess Royal
- Patrons: Lord Carlile of Berriew; Pauline Neville-Jones, Baroness Neville-Jones; Lord Harris of Haringey; Admiral Lord West of Spithead GCB
- President: Jonathan Evans, Baron Evans of Weardale KCB DL
- Board of directors: Chair and Vice Chair(s) – Julie Nel MA CSyP FSyI (Chair); Chris Stevens CSyP MSc F.ISRM FSyI (Vice Chair); Hayley Elvins CSyP FSyI (Vice Chair)
- Key people: Abiola Aderibigbe LLB, LLM, PhD (Cand) (General Counsel & Board Director; Chair, Ethics Committee)
- Main organ: Annual General Meeting
- Staff: 17
- Website: security-institute.org

The Security Institute is a United Kingdom based professional body for security professionals.

Membership of the Institute is open to security professionals, with other individuals with an interest in security being able to become affiliated. Based on validation of experience, training, qualifications and other contributions, applicants are given one of five grades of membership. Associates (ASyI), Members (MSyI) and Fellows (FSyI) are entitled to use post-nominals indicating their level of membership in the Institute. There is a separate category for student members.

== Activities ==
The Security Institute hosts regular seminars and social events as well as an annual conference. Most of the activities are geared towards professional development.

As part of its work in raising industry standards the Institute place great emphasis on the work of its Validation Board and the assessment of members' achievements before joining. Existing members are encouraged to seek promotion to a higher membership level.

=== Continuing Professional Development ===
The Security Institute runs a mentoring programme and an assessed Continuing Professional Development (CPD) programme.

=== Training ===
PerpetuityARC, a Leicester based training provider, delivers certificate, diploma and advanced diploma qualifications via distance learning on behalf of the Security Institute. The Certificate in Security Management is a BTEC Level 3 qualification whereas the Diploma in Security Management is a BTEC Level 5 qualification.

=== Chartered Security Professionals ===
The Security Institute operates the Register of Chartered Security Professionals on behalf of the Worshipful Company of Security Professionals. The Institute was also the first licensee that can admit Chartered Security Professionals (CSyP). Membership of the Institute is separate from becoming a Chartered Security Professional, which involves a comprehensive documentation procedure of the candidate's competencies in security related subjects as well as an interview. The first CSyPs were admitted in June 2011.

== History ==
The Security Institute was established in 1999 "to enhance the professionalism and profile of the business of security." The founders, a group of different security professionals, wished to communicate how security is a separate professional field of activity. Realising that there was no objective system for measuring and accrediting security practitioners in the United Kingdom they decided to form the Security Institute.

In 2008, the Security Institute merged with the International Institute of Security (IISec), which had been established in 1968.

=== Leadership ===
The Security Institute is governed by a Board of Directors and a Chief Executive Officer.

On 15 October 2025, the Board confirmed Sarah Austerberry MLitt CSyP FSyI as Chief Executive Officer following a four-month period as Interim CEO.

Abiola Aderibigbe serves on the Board of Directors as General Counsel and Board Director, and chairs the Ethics Committee.

=== Chairperson ===
- 1999 - 2005: Geoff Whitfield FSyI
- 2005 - 2009: Bill Wyllie CSyP FSyI
- 2009 - 2013: Mike Bluestone MA CSyP FSyI
- 2013 - 2015: Emma Shaw MBA CSyP FSyI FCMI
- 2015 - 2017: Garry Evanson MSc BA PgDip PGCE CSyP FSyI
- 2018 - 2021: Dr Alison Wakefield FSyI
- 2021 - 2023: Peter Lavery FSyI
- 2023 - Present: Julie Nel MA CSyP FSyI

== Awards ==
The Security Institute awards several prizes.

The George van Schalkwyk Award was instituted in 2007 and is awarded to an individual who has made an outstanding contribution to the cause of security professionalism. The award is named after George van Schalkwyk, an institute member killed in a helicopter accident in Afghanistan in July 2006.

The John Aplin Award was instituted in 1998 by the International Institute of Security (IISec). It was initially awarded to the person who sat all six modules of the Certificate in Security Management examination in one day and achieved the highest score. After a reorganisation of the Certificate course the award was not awarded but was reestablished in 2008 after the IISec merger with the Security Institute, and awarded at the Annual General Meeting in the subsequent year. The award is named after Johns Aplin, a long-standing member, director and trustee of the International Institute of Security.

The Wilf Knight Award was instituted in 2008 and awarded for the first time in 2009. The award honours a student who has made a valuable academic contribution to the development of security management through distinction and/or innovation in methodology or theorising in the general field of security management and/or professional security practice. The Wilf Knight Award is presented at the annual Security Excellence Awards ceremony organised by United Business Media. The award is named after Wilf Knight (1944–2008) a former industry professional and member of the Institute.

Year	George van Schalkwyk Award	John Aplin Award	Wilf Knight Award
2007	Stewart Kidd	—	—
2008	John Allan	Emma Thomas	—
2009	Bill Wyllie	—	Danie Adendorff (Loughborough University)
2010	Ken Livingstone	Peter Brown	Angus Darroch-Warren (Loughborough University)
2011	—	—	Leonie Darbon (University of Leicester) and Matthew Mackmin (Cranfield University)
2012	David Gill	—	Ian Middleton (Cranfield University)
2013	Mike Bluestone	Lee Trumper	Adam Jones (Buckinghamshire New University)
2014	Di Thomas	—	Andy Bowers (University of Portsmouth)

== See also ==
- List of learned societies
- List of British professional bodies
- Worshipful Company of Security Professionals
- ASIS International
- Imbert Prize
