= Imbert =

Imbert may refer to:

== People ==
- Antonio Imbert Barrera (1920–2016), Dominican military figure and politician, President of the Dominican Republic in 1965
- Barthélemy Imbert (1747–1790), French playwright, poet and novelist
- Carmen Imbert Brugal (born 1955), Dominican jurist and writer
- Charles Imbert (born 1952), French rower
- Colm Imbert (born 1957), politician from Trinidad and Tobago
- Françoise Imbert (born 1947), French politician
- Daniel Imbert (1952–2016), Mauritian footballer
- Enrique Anderson Imbert (1910–2000), Argentine novelist, short-story writer and literary critic
- Georges Imbert (1884–1950), French chemical engineer and inventor
- Jacky Imbert (1929–2019), French gang leader
- José María Bartolomé Imbert Duplessis (1798–1847), French-born Dominican military figure and politician
- Juan Imbert (born 1990), Argentine footballer
- Michel Imbert (1935–2026), French neuropsychologist
- Peter Michael Imbert, Baron Imbert (1933–2017), British peer, Commissioner of the Metropolitan Police Service
- Saint Laurent-Joseph-Marius Imbert, M.E.P. (1796–1839), French missionary bishop in Korea
- Segundo Francisco Imbert del Monte (1837–1905), Dominican military figure and politician, Vice President of the Dominican Republic
- Claude Imbert (born 16 October 1933) a French philosopher

== Places ==
- Imbert, Dominican Republic, a populated place in Puerto Plata province, Dominican Republic
- Chantenay-Saint-Imbert, a commune in the Nièvre department, central France

== Other uses ==
- Imbert–Fedorov effect, an optical phenomenon
- Imbert Prize, a British award instituted in 2005 for the advancement of risk and security management
- Imbert-Terry Baronetcy, a title in the Baronetage of the United Kingdom
