= Sverdrup Prize =

Norwegian statistics award

The Sverdrup Prize (Sverdrupprisen) is a Norwegian honorary award concerning the fields of theoretical and applied statistics.

== History ==
It was established in the memory of Erling Sverdrup (1917–1994) who was professor of mathematical statistics and insurance mathematics with the Department of Mathematics at the University of Oslo from 1953 until his retirement in 1984. Sverdrup was instrumental in building up and modernising the fields of statistics and actuarial science in Norway.

In 2007, the Norwegian Statistical Association (Norsk statistisk forening) announced the creation of the Sverdrup Prize, with the first prizes to be awarded in 2009. There is one Sverdup Prize to a prominent statistician ("an eminent representative of the statistics profession") and a second award to a younger statistician who has authored or coauthored a high quality journal article. The prizes entail a diploma and a stipend and are awarded every second year, typically in connection with the biennial conferences of the Norwegian Statistical Association.

== Winners ==
Year	Winner "eminent representative"	Winner "young researchers"
2024	Ingrid Kristine Glad	Mats Julius Stensrud
2021	Arnoldo Frigessi	Celine Marie Løken Cunen
2019	Bo Henry Lindqvist and Karl Henning Omre	Steffen Grønneberg
2015	Odd Aalen	Tore Selland Kleppe
2013	Nils Lid Hjort	Ingrid Hobæk Haff and Kjetil Røysland
2011	Tore Schweder	Ida Scheel
2009	Dag Tjøstheim	Sara Martino

== Other sources ==
- Norwegian Statistical Association's Sverdrup Prize
- Sverdrup Prize awarded Nils Lid Hjort, 2013
- Sverdrup Prize awarded Tore Schweder, 2011
- Sverdrup Prize awarded Dag Tjøstheim, 2009
