= Board certification (disambiguation) =

Board certification may refer to:

- Board certification, for physicians in an area of medical specialization.
- Nursing board certification, for nurses who obtain additional specialty training.
- Some other Professional certifications are called "board certifications", such as ASIS International's Certified Protection Professional board certification.
