= Luz María Umpierre =

Puerto Rican writer and educator (born 1947)

- Born: October 15, 1947 (age 79); Santurce, Puerto Rico
- Occupations: Human Rights Advocate, New-Humanist Educator, Poet, and Scholar
- Writing career
- Notable works: The Margarita Poems, For Christine, Y otras desgracias/And Other Misfortunes, En el país de las maravillas, Pour toi/For Moira, Our Only Island, I'm Still Standing: 30 Years of Poetry.
- Notable awards: Michael Lynch Award for Service LGBT(MLA), Distinguished Woman of Maine, Distinguished Alumna in the Humanities (Universidad del Sagrado Corazón), Woman of the Year (Western Kentucky University), Ford Foundation Fellow, NEH Grant.
- Website: LuzmaUmpierre.com

Luz María "Luzma" Umpierre-Herrera (born October 15, 1947) is a Puerto Rican advocate for human rights, a New-Humanist educator, poet, and scholar. Her work addresses a range of critical social issues including activism and social equality, the immigrant experience, bilingualism in the United States, and LGBT matters. Luzma authored six poetry collections and two books on literary criticism, in addition to having essays featured in academic journals.

== Life ==
Luz María Umpierre was born in Santurce, Puerto Rico, in 1947, and grew up in a working-class neighborhood called "La veintiuna" (Stop 21) in a household with sixteen people. Her mother was born in Puerto Rico and grew up in New York City. Therefore, she was exposed to both English and Spanish as a child. Her father was a government worker. Umpierre studied at the Sacred Heart Academy and the Universidad del Sagrado Corazón, both in Puerto Rico, graduating with honors.

After several years of teaching at the Academia María Reina in San Juan, Umpierre felt that she was a "sexile." The prejudice she experienced as an open lesbian contributed to her moving to the mainland in 1974. As she continued to work in academia in the United States, she was prejudiced against not only for her sexual orientation but also for her Puerto Rican origin and ethnicity. These experiences led her to decide to mentor Puerto Rican-born, underprivileged, and exiled immigrant students.

== Education and career ==
She earned her B.A. in Spanish and Humanities with honors from the Universidad del Sagrado Corazón in 1970. In 1976, she received her M.A. in Spanish (Caribbean Literature) from Bryn Mawr College in Pennsylvania, where she also completed her Ph.D. in Spanish (1978). Umpierre also completed postdoctoral studies in the fields of Literary Theory at the University of Kansas (1981-1982), University Administration (Recruitment and Retention of Minorities) as a State of New Jersey/Woodrow Wilson International Center Fellow (1986), and Management and Policy at the New School for Social Research, Milano School-Syracuse Campus (1995-1996).

After finishing her Ph.D. in 1978, Umpierre went on to teach at several institutions. She was the first Puerto Rican to receive tenure at the Department of Spanish and Portuguese at Rutgers University, where she taught the first graduate-level course on Colonial Latin American Literature. She also created the first courses on Caribbean Literature and Culture at Rutgers University, as well as one of the first courses on Latinas in the U.S. to be taught in the country. She was the first openly Lesbian Latina Scholar in Residence in Women's Studies at Penn State University.

Her presence as an open lesbian Latina academic at Rutgers was met with a conservative backlash. She was banned in 1989 from teaching at the university for her texts on the inclusion of Gay and Lesbian authors in her literature classes and also after speaking at the March on Washington, DC, of 1987. This setback only reinforced her activism regarding LGBT studies, as she has continued to be an activist for the inclusion of LGBT topics in academia.

After leaving Rutgers, she worked as Head and Professor of the Department of Modern Languages and Intercultural Studies and Folklore at Western Kentucky University (WKU). It was while working at WKU that Umpierre received the "Woman of the Year" award. She continued to work with the underprivileged and marginalized groups in society.

In 1992, she became a faculty member at the State University of New York Brockport (SUNY) and was a Professor of Foreign Languages and literature. Again, she was met with academic backlash for her activism for LGBT rights. In 1992, she was accused by SUNY of "exposing students to homosexuality" for teaching literature from a Homocriticism view and was suspended for two years. She subsequently became homeless, yet continued her work as an advocate for equality in academia.

Umpierre eventually relocated to Bates College in Lewiston, Maine, where she was an Associate Professor for Classic and Romance Languages and literature, along with Women Studies in 1998. She also expanded the curriculum of this university to include adding courses dealing with Latina Literature and Culture, Creative Writing, and Latin American Studies. She eventually left Bates College in 2002 to nurture her writing career and continue her activism.

== Poetry ==
Umpierre has published six books of poetry and two chapbooks or "hojas poéticas." She has received critical attention, particularly from women, feminist, and queer scholars.

Umpierre is a bilingual poet who writes in English and Spanish and sometimes mixes both languages in the same poem. Her work was published by tatiana de la tierra in de la tierra's bilingual magazine, Esto no tiene nombre, for Latina lesbians. She also supported de la tierra's other magazine, conmoción, which was a continuation and expansion of esto no tiene nombre meant to be a platform for conversation about Latina lesbians through publishing work like Umpierre's. In her work, she establishes a conversation with many American, Latin American, and Puerto Rican women poets and writers such as Sylvia Plath, Virginia Woolf, Sor Juana Inés de la Cruz, Julia de Burgos, and Sandra María Esteves. Noted among these is the poetical exchange she carried for years with the major Nuyorican poet Sandra María Esteves; this exchange was lauded in Europe and the US and was included in a special radio program of the MLA because of its uniqueness.

Umpierre started out her poetry career with the publication of Una puertorriqueña en Penna (1979), whose title can be translated as "A Puerto Rican woman in Pennsylvania" or "A Puerto Rican woman in pain." In this book, the author offers poems that comment on the discrimination that the Puerto Rican community faced in Philadelphia. The final poem in that collection, "Mascarada la vida", signals towards the lesbian themes which she would develop further in other collections. Umpierre also comments on the prejudice against Puerto Ricans in institutions of higher education, particularly in Spanish departments that judged Puerto Rican Spanish as deficient or incorrect. She also explores these topics in her second and third books, En el país de las maravillas (Kempis puertorriqueño) (1982) and . . . Y otras desgracias/And Other Misfortunes. . . (1985), which shows a marked turn towards more bilingualism and carries openly Lesbian poems. The same book was included as a Stonewall Era publication.

One of Umpierre's books is The Margarita Poems (1987), where she discusses her lesbianism and offers highly erotic poems about lesbian love. The book describes the process of lesbian spiritual rebirth, growing out of repression enforced by Catholicism and towards radical, political thought. The book also discusses issues of feminist sisterhood, Puerto Rican independence, and immigrant experience. The books follows two central female characters, "Margarita", representing the sexual domain of womanhood and "Julia", representing intellectual, puertorriqueña, and lesbian essence.

In the 1990s, she published her book For Christine (1995). In the 2000s, she published two chapbooks or "hojas poéticas": Pour toi/For Moira (2005) and Our Only Island—for Nemir (2009). A volume of her complete works edited by Carmen S. Rivera and Daniel Torres was published in 2011.

== Scholarship ==
Umpierre has published two books of literary criticism focusing on Puerto Rican literature and numerous critical articles mostly on Caribbean literature and women authors. She is one of the few people who has written on Nemir Matos' poems. She advances a "homocritical" theory of reading, which she labels as "Homocriticism", suggesting that homosexual readers can be more attuned to perceiving hidden queer meaning in a literary work. Her first article on this subject appeared in Collages & Bricolages in 1993 under the title "On Critical Diversity" and dealt with the book Fragmentos a su imán by José Lezama Lima, although it was written in the early 1980s and taught at Rutgers University in Graduate Seminars during that decade. She developed her ideas further on this topic in an article on Carmen Lugo Filippi's short story "Milagros, calle Mercurio" [Milagros, Mercury Street].

== Awards, nominations and noted posts ==
- Consultant for National Endowment for the Humanities from 1980 to 1985, and 1988.
- Executive Board Member for New Jersey Voters for Civil Liberties from 1985 to 1989.
- Consultant for the National Graduate Fellows Program, USA, Department of Education in 1986.
- Distinguished Lecturer and Guest Writer at Carleton College in 1987. Topic of lecture: Hispanic Women Writers in the USA.
- Lifetime Achievement Award, Coalition of Lesbian and Gay Organizations in New Jersey in 1990.
- Elected to the Delegate Assembly of the Modern Language Association for Ethnic Studies and Special Interests from 1991 to 1993.
- Keynote Speaker, Bayard Rustin Breakfast, AIDS Massachusetts in 1991.
- Honored by New York Chapter of the National Writers Union in 1993.
- Nominated for the Women's Hall of Fame, Seneca Falls, New York in 1994 and again in 2009.
- Chair, Feministas Unidas session at MLA convention on "Teaching Taboos in Hispanic Literature," Washington, D.C. in December 1996.
- Keynote speaker, Ford Foundation Annual Fellows Convention, Washington, D.C. in 1997.
- Member of NEH Committee at Bates College from 1998 to 2000.
- Nominated for the Martin Duberman Fellowship at CUNY in 2000.
- Keynote Speaker at Ohio University (Athens) on "Sexuality in Literature and Film Conference," in 2001.
- Elected to Governing Committee, Puerto Rican Literature and Culture Study Group, MLA in 1998 and promoted to Chair in 2002.
- Nominated for the Phyllis Franklin Humanities Award from the M.L.A. in 2002.
- Elected to the Division of Ethnic Studies of the Modern Language Association from 2000 to 2004 and the Delegate assembly from 2005 to 2007.
- Distinguished Woman Leader of Maine, 2008.
- Nominated for the 2010 inclusion to the Women's Hall of Fame in Seneca Falls, New York.
- Nominated for Pioneer Award From LAMBDA in 2013.
- Nominated for a South Korean International Award for Human Rights Activism, being the only Puerto Rican Lesbian having been nominated.

== List of works ==
=== Poetry ===
- Una puertorriqueña en Penna. [Puerto Rico]: Master Typesetting of P.R., 1979.
- En el país de las maravillas (Kempis puertorriqueño). Bloomington, Ind.: Third Woman Press, 1982.
- . . . Y otras desgracias/And Other Misfortunes. . . Bloomington, Ind.: Third Woman Press, 1985.
- The Margarita Poems. Bloomington, Ind.: Third Woman Press, 1987.
- For Christine: Poems and One Letter. Chapel Hill, N.C.: Professional Press, 1995.
- Pour toi/ For Moira. San Juan, Puerto Rico: Mariita Rivadulla and Associates, 2005.
- Our Only Island—for Nemir. San Juan, Puerto Rico: Mariita Rivadulla Professional Services, 2009.
- I'm Still Standing: Treinta años de poesía/Thirty Years of Poetry, eds. Carmen S. Rivera and Daniel Torres. Orlando, FL and Fredonia, NY: www.luzmaumpierre.com and SUNY-Fredonia, 2011.

=== Literary criticism ===
- Ideología y novela en Puerto Rico: un estudio de la narrativa de Zeno, Laguerre y Soto. Madrid: Playor, 1983.
- Nuevas aproximaciones críticas a la literatura puertorriqueña contemporánea. Río Piedras: Editorial Cultural, 1983.

== See also ==
- List of LGBT writers
- List of lesbian literature
- List of Puerto Rican writers
- Puerto Rican literature
- Nuyorican Movement
