= Chartered Security Professional =

London professional security certification

Chartered Security Professionals (CSyP) logo

Chartered Security Professional (CSyP) is a professional certification in security offered by the Worshipful Company of Security Professionals, a livery company in the City of London. The certification has been established to show the attainment of strategic and higher operational level competencies in security. The Register of Chartered Security Professionals is managed by the Security Institute and overseen by the Chartered Security Professionals Registration Authority (CSPRA).

== Criteria ==
The core criteria for becoming a Chartered Security Professional is to have a high level of competency within five fields:

- Knowledge (30% of total): Use a combination of specialist and generalist security knowledge and understanding to optimise the employment of existing and emerging methods and technologies.
- Practice Skills (35% of total): Apply appropriate techniques, methodologies and processes to resolve security and risk related issues.
- Leadership (10% of total): Provide technical and commercial leadership.
- Communications (15% of total): Demonstrate effective interpersonal skills.
- Professional Commitment (10% of total): Demonstrate a personal commitment to professional standards, recognising obligations to society, the profession and the environment.

These five fields of competency are specified in 16 sub-competencies. Chartered Security Professionals must also be making a strategic impact in the work that they do.

=== Standard route ===
The standard route to the certification involves three steps to demonstrate that the candidate has competency at the specified level:

- A university degree in a security-related discipline (or an equivalent qualification recognised by the Chartered Security Professionals Registration Authority) or degree in any subject plus a security-related vocational qualification.
- Five years' operational security experience with at least two years at the Chartered competence level.
- Interview and presentation.

=== Individual route ===
The individual route to certification places the emphasis more on experience than formal qualifications. In this route the candidate needs to:

- Complete and present a portfolio of three essays each of 2,500 words chosen from a list of security questions.
- Have ten years operational security experience with at least five years at the Chartered competence level.
- Interview and presentation.

=== Standards ===
After admission to the Register of Chartered Security Professionals the registrants need to conduct annual documented continuing professional development (CPD), and adhere to a specified code of professional conduct.

== Management ==
Chartered Security Professionals are admitted into the Register of Chartered Security Professionals. The Worshipful Company of Security Professionals has engaged the Security Institute to manage the register.

=== Chartered Security Professionals Registration Authority ===
The Chartered Security Professionals Registration Authority (CSPRA) is the management board of the Register of Chartered Security Professionals, and responsible for maintaining standards and practices in the Chartered Security Professionals scheme. CSPRA's current Chairman is Baroness Henig CBE CSyI.

=== Licensees ===
It is foreseen that several organisations will be licensed to admit CSyPs into the Register of Chartered Security Professionals, and that this will work in a similar way to the Engineering Council licensing a number of engineering institutions to admit Chartered Engineers, Incorporated Engineers and Engineering Technicians.

Initially, the Security Institute was the sole licensee who could admit Chartered Security Professionals to the Register. The Security Institute provide a Certificate in Security Management at Level 3, a Diploma in Security Management at Level 5, and an Advanced Diploma in Security Management at Level 7. The second licensee is ASIS UK Chapter 208. ASIS own the Certified Protection Professional (CPP), Physical Security Professional (PSP) and Professional Certified Investigator (PCI) Certifications and ASIS UK will be mentoring and introducing individuals to the Register.

== Recognition ==
The Register of Chartered Security Professionals won the 2012 "Contribution to Standards in the Security Sector" at the annual Security Excellence Awards in 2012.

== History ==
At the first annual general meeting of the Security Institute on 1 February 2001 the then Registrar and Secretary, Stewart Kidd set out the Institute's short, medium and long term objectives. The latter included the aspiration 'to become the sole professional organisation representing the security' manager and 'to achieve Chartered status'. Peter French, the director of one of the UK's largest security recruiters and at the time Senior Regional Vice President for ASIS International in Europe stated the need for a "Chartered Security Professionals" scheme in a 2007 interview. This need was repeated later the same year by Bill Wyllie, at the time the Chairman of the Security Institute. Stuart Lowden, Managing Director of the guarding company Wilson James, simultaneously stated that much work had to be done before a chartered scheme for security professionals could become reality.

The Worshipful Company of Security Professionals was awarded the exclusive right to establish a Register of Chartered Security Professionals when they were given a Royal charter by the Privy Council in March 2010. Realising that they did not have the administrative capacity to run such a register they established a joint working group with the Security Institute in June 2010 with the intention of setting up a Register of Chartered Security Professionals. The Worshipful Company also specified that the Security Institute should manage the Register because they had the administrative procedures and experience to make it work in practice. The group that planned the establishment of the scheme was led by the Worshipful Company's Master, Don Randall MBE, who was also the head of security at the Bank of England. The working group also consisted of Mike Bluestone, Peter French MBE, Di Thomas, David Gill and Roy Penrose OBE QPM.

=== Establishing the certification ===
The criteria for joining the Register of Chartered Security Professionals were based on research done by a working party that consisted of Dr Alison Wakefield (University of Portsmouth), Angus Darroch-Warren (Linx International), Garry Evanson (De La Rue), Anders Groenli (Ove Arup & Partners) and Chris Roberts (Association of Security Consultants). The working party based their recommendations to a large part on the UK Standard for Professional Engineering Competence (UK-SPEC), but also sought advice from the Foundation for Science and Technology and the Engineering Council. The final version of criteria for becoming a Chartered Security Professional are therefore to a large degree based on the criteria for Chartered Engineers. The proposal of Dr Wakefield's working party also included suggestions that the Register of Chartered Security Professionals in time could be expanded with separate categories for those working on operational and tactical levels.

The first ten Chartered Security Professionals were admitted in a ceremony at Drapers' Hall in the City of London on 7 June 2011.

== See also ==
- Chartered (professional)
- Chartered Chemist
- Chartered Engineer
- Chartered Environmentalist
- Chartered IT Professional
- Chartered Physicist
- Chartered Scientist
- Certified Protection Professional
- Physical Security Professional
- Suitably Qualified and Experienced Person
