= Paul A. Schweitzer =

American mathematician

Paul A. Schweitzer SJ
- Born: Paul Alexander Schweitzer; July 21, 1937 (age 89); Yonkers, New York, U.S.
- Education: College of the Holy Cross (BS); Princeton University (PhD); Weston College (PhL, BDiv)
- Scientific career
- Fields: Topology
- Workplaces: Institute for Advanced Study; Pontifical Catholic University of Rio de Janeiro
- Thesis: Secondary cohomology operations induced by the diagonal mapping (1962)
- Doctoral advisor: Norman Steenrod
- Doctoral students: Suely Druck

Paul Alexander Schweitzer SJ (born July 21, 1937) is an American mathematician specializing in differential topology, geometric topology, and algebraic topology.

Schweitzer has done research on foliations, knot theory, and 3-manifolds. In 1974, he found a counterexample to the Seifert conjecture that every non-vanishing vector field on the 3-sphere has a closed integral curve. In 1995, he demonstrated that Sergei Novikov's compact leaf theorem cannot be generalized to manifolds with dimension greater than 3. Specifically, Schweitzer proved that a smooth, compact, connected manifold with Euler characteristic zero and dimension > 3 has a C^{1} codimension-one foliation that has no compact leaf.

== Life and career ==
Schweitzer was raised in New York. After high school, he graduated from the College of the Holy Cross with a Bachelor of Science (B.S.), magna cum laude, in mathematics in 1958. As an undergraduate at Holy Cross, he wrote a senior thesis titled, "Hereditary and Productive Properties in Topological Spaces". He then earned his Ph.D. from Princeton University in 1962 under the supervision of Norman Steenrod. His doctoral dissertation was titled, "Secondary cohomology operations induced by the diagonal mapping".

In 1963, Schweitzer became a member of the Society of Jesus (Jesuits). He earned a degree in philosophy (Ph.L.) from Weston College in Weston, Massachusetts, in 1966 and a Bachelor of Divinity (B.Div.) from the Weston Jesuit School of Theology in Cambridge, Massachusetts, in 1970. He was ordained in 1970 as a Catholic priest. In 1971, he became a professor extraordinarius at the Pontifical Catholic University of Rio de Janeiro, and, in 1980, he became a professor ordinarius there.

Schweitzer has been a visiting professor at the University of Notre Dame, the Fairfield University, Northwestern University, Boston College, Harvard University, and the University of Strasbourg. For the academic years 1970–1971 and 1981–1982 he was at the Institute for Advanced Study.

Since 1978 he has been on the board of the Brazilian Mathematical Society.

He was elected a Fellow of the American Mathematical Society in 2012. He was an Invited Speaker at the ICM in 1974 in Vancouver.
