= Manfredo do Carmo =

Brazilian mathematician

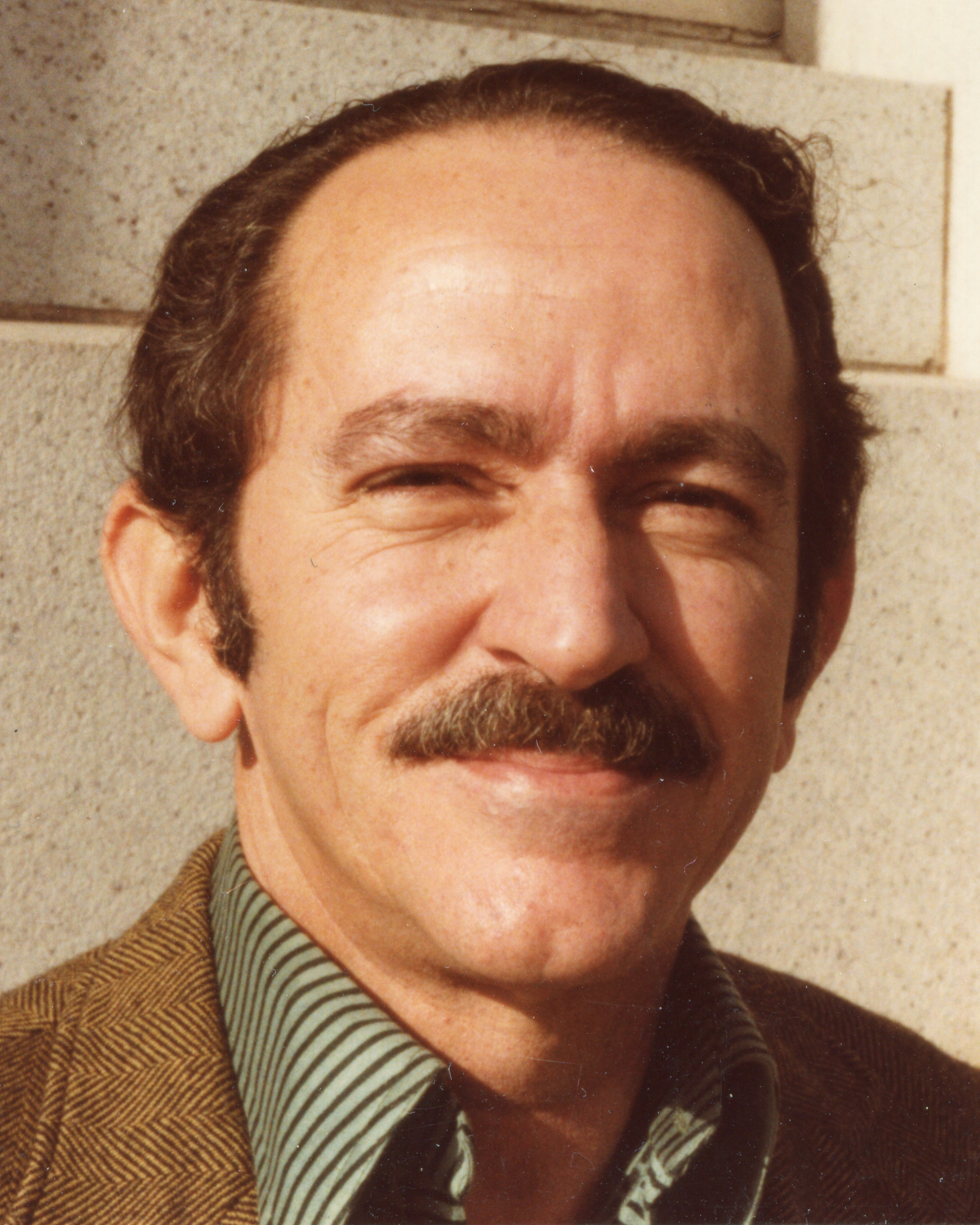
- do Carmo in 1979
- Born: 15 August 1928; Maceió, Alagoas
- Died: 30 April 2018 (aged 89); Rio de Janeiro
- Resting place: Cemitério de São João Batista
- Education: University of California, Berkeley
- Awards: Guggenheim Fellowship (1965, 1968); Prêmio Almirante Álavaro Alberto (1984); Brazil's National Order of Scientific Merit (1995); TWAS Prize (1987); AMS Fellow (2012)
- Scientific career
- Fields: Mathematics
- Workplaces: Instituto Nacional de Matemática Pura e Aplicada
- Thesis: The Cohomology Ring of Certain Kahlerian Manifolds (1963)
- Doctoral advisor: Shiing-Shen Chern
- Doctoral students: Celso Costa; Marcos Dajczer; Keti Tenenblat

Manfredo do Carmo at Berkeley, California in 1968

Manfredo Perdigão do Carmo (15 August 1928, Maceió – 30 April 2018, Rio de Janeiro) was a Brazilian mathematician. He spent most of his career at IMPA and is seen as the doyen of differential geometry in Brazil.

== Education and career ==
Do Carmo studied civil engineering at the University of Recife from 1947 to 1951. After working a few years as engineer, he accepted a teaching position at the newly created Institute of Physics and Mathematics at Recife.

On suggestion of Elon Lima, in 1959 he went to Instituto Nacional de Matemática Pura e Aplicada (IMPA) to improve his background and in 1960 he moved to the US to pursue a Ph.D. in mathematics at the University of California, Berkeley under the supervision of Shiing-Shen Chern. He defended his thesis The Cohomology Ring of Certain Kahlerian Manifolds in 1963.

After working again at University of Recife and at the University of Brasilia, in 1966 he became professor at IMPA in Rio de Janeiro. From 2003 to his death he was emeritus professor at the same institution.

Do Carmo was a Guggenheim Fellow in 1965 and 1968. In 1978 he was invited speaker at the International Congress of Mathematicians held in Helsinki. In 1991 he obtained a Doctorate honoris causa from Federal University of Alagoas and in 2012 from University of Murcia and from Federal University of Amazonas.

He served as president of the Brazilian Mathematical Society in the term 1971–1973. He was elected a member of the Brazilian Academy of Sciences in 1970, a member of The World Academy of Sciences (TWAS) in 1997 and a fellow of the American Mathematical Society in 2013.

Among his awards, he received the Prêmio Almirante Álavaro Alberto from the National Council for Scientific and Technological Development in 1984, the TWAS Prize in Mathematics in 1992, the National Order of Scientific Merit in 1995 and the Comenda Graciliano Ramos from the municipality of Maceió in 2000.

Do Carmo died on 30 April 2018 at the age of 89.

== Research ==
Do Carmo's main research interests were Riemannian geometry and the differential geometry of surfaces.

In particular, he worked on rigidity and convexity of isometric immersions, stability of hypersurfaces and of minimal surfaces, topology of manifolds, isoperimetric problems, minimal submanifolds of a sphere, and manifolds of constant mean curvature and vanishing scalar curvature.

Do Carmo published more than 100 papers in peer-reviewed journals; in 2012 a selection of his works was published by Springer. He is also known for his textbooks: they were translated into many languages and used in courses from universities such as Harvard and Columbia.

He supervised 27 PhD students, including Celso Costa, Marcos Dajczer and Keti Tenenblat.

== Books ==
- Differential Geometry of Curves and Surfaces, Prentice-Hall, 1976 ISBN 9780132125895.
- Riemannian Geometry, Birkhäuser, 1992 ISBN 978-0-8176-3490-2
- Differential Forms and Applications, Springer Verlag, Universitext, 1994 ISBN 978-3-540-57618-1
- (with Eduardo Wagner and Augusto Cezar de Oliveira Morgado). Trigonometria – Números Complexos (in Portuguese) ISBN 8583370168
- Superfícies Mínimas (in Portuguese), 1987, 2004, 2011 ISBN 978-85-244-0197-8
- O Método do Referencial Móvel, 1976, 2008, 2012 (in Portuguese) ISBN 978-85-244-0281-4
