= Jesper Møller =

Jesper Møller may refer to:

- Jesper Møller (animator), Danish animator, screenwriter, and movie director
- Jesper Møller (mathematician) (born 1957), Danish mathematician
- Jesper Møller (football executive) (born 1963), Danish lawyer and sports executive
