= Wartenberg's coefficient =

Spatial correlation coefficient

Wartenberg's coefficient is a measure of correlation developed by epidemiologist Daniel Wartenberg. This coefficient is a multivariate extension of spatial autocorrelation that aims to account for spatial dependence of data while studying their covariance. A modified version of this statistic is available in the R package adespatial.

For data $x_i$ measured at $N$ spatial sites Moran's I is a measure of the spatial autocorrelation of the data. By standardizing the observations $z_i = (x_i - \bar{x})/s$ by subtracting the mean and dividing by the variance as well as normalising the spatial weight matrix such that $\sum_{ij} w_{ij} = 1$ we can write Moran's I as

$$I = \sum_{ij} w_{ij} z_i z_j$$

Wartenberg generalized this by letting $z_i$ be a vector of $M$ observations at $i$ and defining where:

$$I = Z^T W Z$$

- $W$ is the $N \times N$ spatial weight matrix
- $Z$ is the $N \times M$ standardized data matrix
- $Z^T$ is the transpose of $Z$
- $I$ is the $M \times M$ spatial correlation matrix.

For two variables $x$ and $y$ the bivariate correlation is

$$I_{xy} = \frac{ N \sum_{ij} w_{ij} (x_i - \bar{x}) (y_j - \bar{y})}{ \sqrt{ \sum_i (x_i -\bar{x})^2} \sqrt{ \sum_i (y_i -\bar{y})^2}  }$$

For $M=1$ this reduces to Moran's $I$. For larger values of $M$ the diagonals of $I$ are the Moran indices for each of the variables and the off-diagonals give the corresponding Wartenberg correlation coefficients. $I$ is an example of a Mantel statistic and so its significance can be evaluated using the Mantel test.

== Criticisms ==
Lee points out some problems with this coefficient namely:

- There is only one factor of $W$ in the numerator, so the comparison is between the raw $x$ data and the spatially averaged $y$ data.
- $I_{xy} \neq I_{yx}$ for non-symmetric spatial weight matrices.

He suggests an alternative coefficient which has two factors of $W$ in the numerator and is symmetric for any weight matrix.

== See also ==
- Tjøstheim's Coefficient
