= Schweder =

Schweder is a surname originally from the Bavaria area of Germany. Schweder is a local name for a person who lived in Swabia, a medieval dukedom that was in southwestern Germany.

== Notable people ==
- J. Michael Schweder (1949–2021), American politician, member of the Pennsylvania House of Representatives
- John Schweder (1927–2005), American football player who played offensive lineman
- Tore Schweder (born 1943), Norwegian statistician and professor of economics

== See also ==
- Schweda
