= Celso Costa =

Brazilian mathematician

Celso José da Costa
- Born: April 7, 1949 (age 77); Congonhinhas, Brazil
- Education: Ph.D. in Mathematics
- Alma mater: IMPA
- Occupation: Mathematician
- Known for: Research in differential geometry, Discovery of Costa's minimal surface

Celso José da Costa (born April 7, 1949 in Congonhinhas) is a Brazilian writer and mathematician who worked in differential geometry. His research activity has focused in the construction and classification of minimal surfaces embedded in three-dimensional Euclidean space. He is best known for his discovery of Costa's minimal surface, which was described in 1982.

He earned his Ph.D. from IMPA in 1982 under the supervision of Manfredo do Carmo. He taught at the Fluminense Federal University.

== Books ==
- A vida misteriosa dos matemáticos (2018, in Portuguese) ISBN 9788555651854
- A arte de driblar destinos (2022, in Portuguese) ISBN 9786560000032
