= Erling Sverdrup =

Norwegian statistician, actuarial mathematician

Erling Sverdrup (23 February 1917 – 15 March 1994) was a Norwegian statistician and actuarial mathematician. He played an instrumental role in building up and modernising the fields of mathematical statistics and actuarial science in Norway, primarily at the Department of Mathematics at the University of Oslo but also via his links to Statistics Norway.

During the second world war Sverdrup was involved with the cryptography part of the war efforts, specifically also with organising and recruiting other mathematicians to the Norwegian cryptography branch, spending part of this time in London. He completed his actuarial exams in autumn 1945. He then became a scientific assistant at the Insurance Mathematical Seminar at the University of Oslo in 1948, where the education of actuaries was organised, after which he spent stipend years in the USA and completed his PhD there in 1952. In 1953 he was made a professor of insurance mathematics and mathematical statistics at the University of Oslo, a position he held until his retirement.

In 1954, Sverdrup became an elected member of the Norwegian Academy of Science and Letters. He was elected as an honorary member of the Norwegian Statistical Association and the Norwegian Association of Actuaries, for his role in establishing and strengthening actuarial education in Norway. In 1969 he was elected as a Fellow of the American Statistical Association. The Sverdrup Prize was established in 2007 by the Norwegian Statistical Association, consisting of an award to a prominent statistician ("an eminent representative of the statistics profession") and a second award to a younger statistician who has authored or coauthored a high quality journal article, with these prizes to be awarded every second year. The first four recipients of the senior Sverdrup Prize have been Dag Tjøstheim (2009), Tore Schweder (2011), Nils Lid Hjort (2013) and Odd Aalen (2015).
