= Jaqueline Mesquita =

Brazilian mathematician

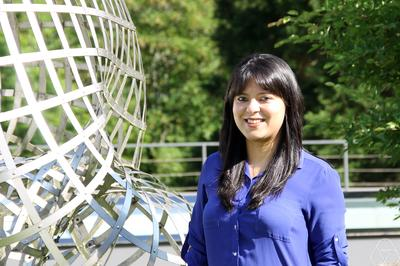
At the Oberwolfach Research Institute for Mathematics, 2018

Jaqueline Godoy Mesquita (born 1985) is a Brazilian mathematician specializing in differential equations and functional differential equations. She is a professor of mathematics at the University of Brasília.

== Education and career ==
Mesquita was born on 20 September 1985. After graduating from the University of Brasília in 2007, she earned a Ph.D. at the University of São Paulo in 2012, with the dissertation Measure functional differential equations and impulsive functional dynamic equations on time scales, jointly supervised by Marcia Cristina Anderson Braz Federson and Antonín Slavík, based in part on work as a visiting student at the Czech Academy of Sciences.

After postdoctoral study at the University of São Paulo and the University of Santiago, Chile, she became a professor at the University of Brasília in 2015.

== Recognition ==
The International Society of Differential Equations gave Mesquita their Bernd Aulbach student prize in 2012.

Mesquita became an affiliate member of the Brazilian Academy of Sciences in 2018. She is also a young affiliate of The World Academy of Sciences. She was a 2019 winner of the Brazilian L'Oréal-UNESCO For Women in Science Awards.

She is the current president of the Brazilian Mathematical Society.
