= Luna Lomonaco =

Researcher from Brazil

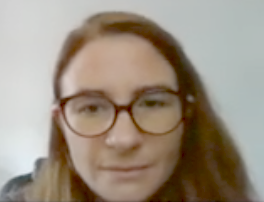
- At an online talk in 2021
- Born: Milan, Italy

Academic background
- Education: University of Padua; Complutense University of Madrid; Roskilde University
- Doctoral advisor: Carsten Lunde Petersen

Academic work
- Discipline: Mathematics
- Main interests: Mandelbrot sets

Luciana Luna Anna Lomonaco is an Italian mathematician specialized in dynamical systems recognized by her works in topology and geometry. She is the first woman to receive the Brazilian Mathematical Society Award. This honor was achieved by working on mandelbrot sets.

== Early life ==
Lumonaco was born in Milan, Italy. Her family moved from Milan to Peschiera del Garda.

Lumonaco studied in a school focus on human sciences. She studied Greek, Latin and philosophy. And because of philosophy she then studied mathematics, because, to her, the problems of mathematics could trigger important thoughts.

== Academic formation and career ==
Lomonaco graduated in mathematics from the University of Padua, Italy. Then, she earn her master's degree from the Complutense University of Madrid, Spain, and her PhD's title from Roskilde University, Denmark, supervised by Carsten Lunde Petersen.

After her PhD, she recognized gaps in her formation. Then, she obtained an opportunity to study in the Chinese Academy of Sciences, where she began to recognize herself professionally. Still in China, an American professor recommended the University of São Paulo.

She arrived in Brazil on 24 April 2014 and became a professor at the Institute of Mathematics and Statistics, University of São Paulo. Lumonaco taught a course of complex dynamic systems.

In 2019, she became the first woman to ever receive the Brazilian Mathematical Society Award with the work On Quasi-Conformal (In-)Compatibility of Satellite Copies of the Mandelbrot Set: I, published in 2017.

She served as teacher at USP until 2020, when she went to the Instituto Nacional de Matemática Pura e Aplicada. With Carolina Araujo, they were the only woman in the institute where 47 researchers worked.

Lomonaco is interested in complex dynamics and mandelbrot sets, but also dedicates herself to scientific dissemination and to disseminate mathematics to women.

== Awards ==
- 2018: Prêmio Para Mulheres na Ciência.
- 2019: Brazilian Mathematical Society Award.
- 2020: Prêmio de Reconhecimento União Matemática da América Latina e Caribe (Umalca).
- 2023: Prêmio Jovem Cientista.

== Selected publications ==
- 2015: Parabolic-like mappings.
- 2017: On parabolic external maps.
- 2017: On quasi-conformal (in-) compatibility of satellite copies of the Mandelbrot set: I.
- 2019: Mating quadratic maps with the modular group II.
- 2022: Dynamics of modular matings.

== Personal life ==
Lomonaco appreciates sea baths and practices singing. She is a fan of Chimamanda Ngozi Adichie's books.
