= Brazilian Mathematical Society Award =

- Awarded for: Outstanding expository article on a mathematical topic
- Country: Brazil
- Presented by: Brazilian Mathematical Society (SBM)
- Reward: R$20,000
- First award: 2013
- Final award: 2025
- Website: sbm.org.br/premio-sbm/

The Brazilian Mathematical Society Award is the highest award for mathematical expository writing. It consists of a prize of R$20,000 and a certificate, and is awarded biennial by the Brazilian Mathematical Society in recognition of an outstanding expository article on a mathematical topic.

== Winners ==
| Recipient | Year | Article |
|---|---|---|
| José Edson Sampaio | 2025 | Moderately Discontinuous Homology |
| Damião Araújo | 2023 | Infinity Laplacian Equations with Singular Absorptions |
| Hubert Lacoin | 2021 | Pinning and disorder relevance for the lattice Gaussian free field II |
| Luna Lomonaco | 2019 | On Quasi-Conformal (In-)Compatibility of Satellite Copies of the Mandelbrot Set: I |
| Robert Morris | 2017 | Independent sets in Hypergraphs |
| Umberto Hryniewicz and Pedro Salomão | 2015 | A Poincaré-Birkhoff theorem for tight Reeb flows on S3 |
| Artur Avila | 2013 | On the regularization of conservative maps |

== See also ==
- List of mathematics awards
