= Schweda =

Schweda is a surname. Notable people with the surname include:

- Brian Schweda (born 1943), American football player
- Otto Schweda (1919–2011), Austrian politician
- Raphael Schweda (born 1976), German cyclist

== See also ==
- Schweder
