= Jesper Møller (mathematician) =

Danish mathematician (born 1957)

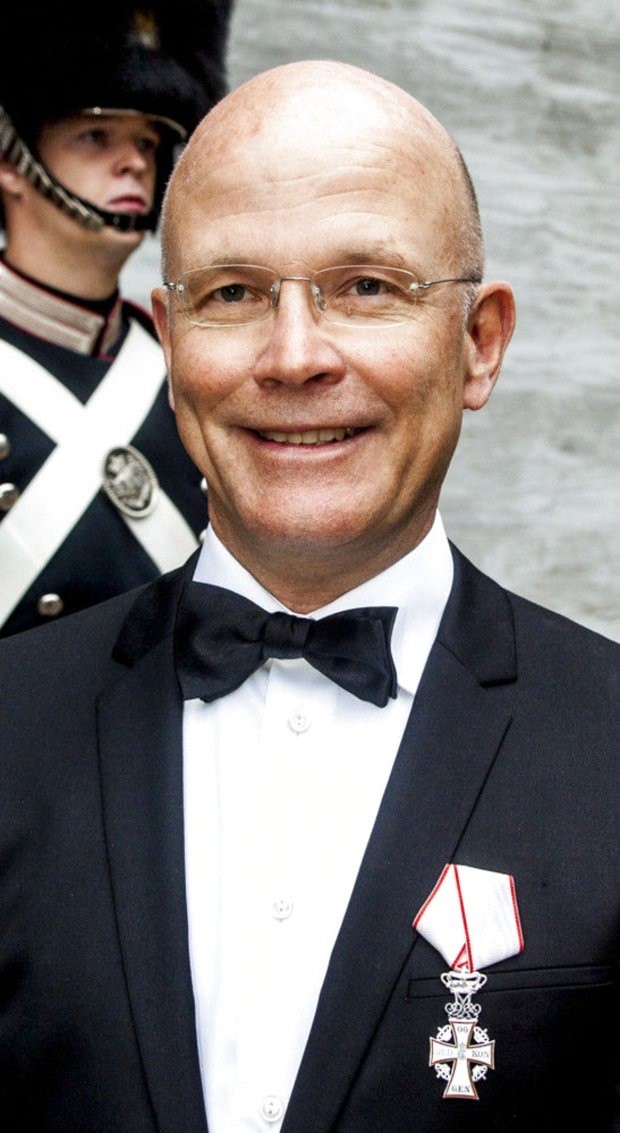
- Born: December 6, 1957 (age 68); Nakskov, Denmark
- Citizenship: Denmark
- Occupation: Professor at Aalborg University
- Employer: Aalborg University
- Website: http://people.math.aau.dk/~jm/

Jesper Møller (also written Moller or Moeller; born December 6, 1957) is a Danish mathematician.

He is a professor at the Department of Mathematical Sciences, Aalborg University, where he conducts research and teaching in mathematical statistics and probability theory. In 2012, he created the Bachelor and Master's Programmes in Mathematics and Technology at Aalborg University.

He was born in Nakskov, Denmark.

== Scientific career ==
Jesper Møller is M.Sc. (cand.scient.) in mathematics and mathematical statistics (Aarhus University), 1984; Ph.D. in mathematical statistics (Aarhus University), 1988; and D.Sc. (dr.scient.; title of dissertation: `Aspects of Spatial Statistics, Stochastic Geometry and Markov Chain Monte Carlo´; Aalborg University), 2000.

He was Assistant Professor and Associate Professor at Aarhus University, 1988–1995, Associate Professor at Aalborg University, 1996–2000, and Professor at Aalborg University since 2001.

== Research ==
Jesper Møller's research interests include

- spatial statistics (in particular statistical models and methods for spatial point processes),
- stochastic geometry (in particular random tessellations),
- stochastic simulation (Markov-chain Monte Carlo methods and perfect simulation).

His research has been supported by project grants from Danish National Research Foundation, Independent Research Fund Denmark, EU, Velux Foundation, and Spar Nord Foundation. He has been Associated Editor of Annals of Applied Probability, Advances in Applied Probability, Bernoulli, and Associate Editor and National Editor of the Scandinavian Journal of Statistics.

== Distinctions ==
- Elected Fellow of the Institute of Mathematical Statistics, 1998.
- Spar Nord Foundation Research Price (DKK 250,000), 2000.
- Presentation of a read-paper at a Royal Statistical Society Meeting in London, 2005.
- Plenary Talk of 3 hours at the 21st Nordic Conference on Mathematical Statistics, presenting an invited paper for the Scandinavian Journal of Statistics.
- Rising Star in the field of Mathematics (Thomson Reuters), 2008.
- Knight of the Order of Dannebrog, 2015.
- Professorem Hospitem, Charles University, Prague, since 2020.

== Selected publications ==
Some of his publications are given as follows:

- J. Møller (1989). Random tessellations in R^d. Advances in Applied Probability, 21:37–73.
- A. Baddeley and J. Møller (1989). Nearest-neighbour Markov point processes and random sets. International Statistical Review, 2:89–121.
- J.L. Jensen and J. Møller (1991). Pseudolikelihood for exponential family models of spatial point processes. Annals of Applied Probability, 3:445-461.
- J. Møller (1994). Lectures on Random Voronoi Tessellations. Lecture Notes in Statistics 87, Springer-Verlag, New York.
- C.J. Geyer and J. Møller (1994). Simulation procedures and likelihood inference for spatial point processes. Scandinavian Journal of Statistics, 21:359–373.
- J. Møller, A.R. Syversveen and R.P. Waagepetersen (1998). Log Gaussian Cox processes. Scandinavian Journal of Statistics, 25:451–482.
- W.S. Kendall and J. Møller (2000). Perfect simulation using dominating processes on ordered spaces, with application to locally stable point processes. Advances in Applied Probability, 32:844–865.
- J. Møller (2003). Shot noise Cox processes. Advances in Applied Probability, 35, 614–640.
- J. Møller and R.P. Waagepetersen (2004). Statistical Inference and Simulation for Spatial Point Processes. Chapman and Hall/CRC, Boca Raton.
- A. Baddeley, R. Turner, J. Møller and M. Hazelton (2005). Residual analysis for spatial point processes (with discussion). Journal of Royal Statistical Society: Series B (Statistical Methodology), 67, 617–666.
- J. Møller, A.N. Pettitt, K.K. Berthelsen and R.W. Reeves (2006). An efficient Markov chain Monte Carlo method for distributions with intractable normalising constants. Biometrika, 93, 451–458.
- J. Møller and R.P. Waagepetersen (2007). Modern statistics for spatial point processes (with discussion). Scandinavian Journal of Statistics, 34, 643–711.
- A. Baddeley, E. Rubak and J. Møller (2011). Score, pseudo-score and residual diagnostics for goodness-of-fit of spatial point process models. Statistical Science, 26, 613–646.
- F. Lavancier, J. Møller and E. Rubak (2015). Determinantal point process models and statistical inference. Journal of Royal Statistical Society: Series B (Statistical Methodology), 77, 853–877.
- E. Anderes, J. Møller and J.G. Rasmussen (2020). Isotropic covariance functions on graphs and their edges. To appear in Annals of Statistics. Available at arXiv:1710.01295.
