= Norwegian Statistical Association =

The Norwegian Statistical Association (Norsk statistisk forening, NSF) has three local societies located respectively in Oslo, Bergen, and Trondheim. The NSF has its own magazine called Tilfeldig Gang (Random Walk). The Society is one of the four organisations responsible for the journal Scandinavian Journal of Statistics (SJS).

The NSF was founded on January 7, 1919. The main goal of the Association was to act as a connection between Norwegian statisticians and to promote their research and professional interests. The Association also aims to make the relationship between statisticians from the Nordic countries stronger and to increase contact with the international statistical society. In 2007, the Association set up the Sverdrup Prize, to be awarded eminent representatives of the statistics profession. The Sverdrup Prizes are awarded every second year, most often in connection with the Association's biennial conferences.

The Association works strongly to promote and increase interest for statistics in the school system as well as in the rest of the society.

== Publications ==
The NSF publishes Tilfeldig Gang and co-publishes Scandinavian Journal of Statistics

== See also ==
- European Mathematical Society
- List of Mathematical Societies
