= Holger Rootzén =

Swedish mathematical statistician (born 1945)

- Born: 25 March 1945 (age 81)
- Education: Lund University
- Scientific career
- Fields: Mathematical Statistics
- Workplaces: Lund University; University of Copenhagen; Chalmers University of Technology
- Thesis: On sequences of random variables which are mixing in the sense of Renyi (1974)
- Doctoral advisor: Gunnar Blom
- Website: www.math.chalmers.se/~rootzen/

Holger Rootzén (born 25 March 1945) is a Swedish mathematical statistician. He is Professor in Mathematical Statistics at the Department of Mathematical Sciences, Chalmers University of Technology since 1993.

== Education and career ==
Rootzén obtained his Ph.D. in 1974 with the thesis On sequences of random variables which are mixing in the sense of Renyi. He has earlier been professor at Lund University and lecturer at University of Copenhagen. Rootzén is member of the Royal Swedish Academy of Sciences. He also serves as adjunct member on the Price Committee for the Alfred Nobel Memorial Prize in Economic Sciences. He has been editor-in-chief for the scientific journals Extremes, Bernoulli, and Scandinavian Journal of Statistics and has received many grants, including a 2013 grant of 50 million SEK from the Knut and Alice Wallenberg foundation.

== Research ==
Rootzén's research areas include probabilistic limit theory, statistics of extremes, and use of mathematics and statistics in medicine, engineering, and risk assessment in economics, epidemiology, and environmental science.

== Bibliography ==
- Leadbetter, M. R.; Lindgren, Georg; Rootzén, Holger (1983). Extremes and related properties of random sequences and processes. New York. ISBN 978-1-4612-5449-2. OCLC 8785206.
- Finkenstadt, Barbel; Rootzén, Holger, eds. (2003). Extreme Values in Finance, Telecommunications, and the Environment. Chapman and Hall/CRC. doi:10.1201/9780203483350. ISBN 978-0-203-48335-0. S2CID 110059037.
- Lindgren, Georg; Rootzén, Holger; Sandsten, Maria (2013). Stationary Stochastic Processes for Scientists and Engineers. Hoboken: CRC Press. ISBN 978-1-4665-8619-2. OCLC 908078290.
