= Alessandro Figà Talamanca =

Italian mathematician (1938–2023)

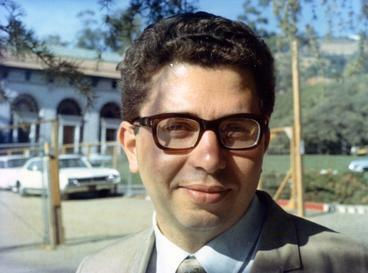
- Talamanca in 1968
- Born: 25 May 1938; Rome, Italy
- Died: 27 November 2023 (aged 85); Rome, Italy
- Scientific career
- Fields: Mathematics
- Workplaces: University of California
- Notable students: Paolo Piccione

Alessandro Figà Talamanca (25 May 1938 – 27 November 2023) was an Italian mathematician who had been given several prestigious tasks, both in Italy and abroad. Several times, he took part in managing the Italian University system and shared his opinions in newspapers, such as La Repubblica. He was a close friend of Carlo Pucci, a mathematician who spent most of his energy in improving the method of teaching maths in Italy, and the management of Italian Maths Departments. (Pucci was, especially, the re-founder of the Istituto Nazionale di Alta Matematica Francesco Severi.) From 1995 to 2003, Figà Talamanca, successor to Pucci, was President of the Istituto, and he continued what Pucci had set up. He was also Vice-President of the European Mathematical Society.

He was a member of the Consiglio Universitario Nazionale and, from 1999 to 2004, of the Comitato nazionale per la valutazione del sistema universitario.

== Career ==
Figà Talamanca did research, and got valuable results, in the field of harmonic analysis, on aleatory Fourier series and the diffusion process, mostly in Rome - at La Sapienza -, but also in the US, especially in the Sixties. During that period on a Fulbright scholarship, he joined research activities in California, UCLA, where he got his Ph.D., in 1964, and, in the same year, was Acting Assistant Professor, and met the well-known French-American mathematician Serge Lang, and also in Boston, Moore Instructor at MIT from 1966 to 1968.

While teaching at MIT, he read Tom M. Apostol's Calculus, a two-volume book, and decided to bring it back to Italy - when he was to become professor at the University of Genova - with him: he was the one who proposed an Italian edition of Apostol's work to a printer in Turin, and he himself overwatched the translation, in 1977.

Talamanca was a lecturer at Berkeley, from 1968 to 1969, then at Yale, from 1969 to 1970, then a visiting professor at Maryland, in Washington, Wales and Sydney.

Talamanca taught calculus for 50 years, including both Italian and American universities. Mostly, he referred to La Sapienza: in 2007, he became General Director of the Maths Department there, but he was to leave in 2009 because he was 71.

Talamanca was able to speak English and Modern Greek.

Talamanca had always been up against Eugene Garfield's Impact factor system in Science.

== Death ==
Talamanca died on 27 November 2023, at the age of 85.

== Selected publications ==
- with John Price: Figà-Talamanca, Alessandro; Price, John (1972). "Applications of random Fourier series over compact groups to Fourier multipliers". Pacific Journal of Mathematics. 43 (2): 531–541. doi:10.2140/pjm.1972.43.531.
- with Claudio Nebbia: Harmonic analysis and representation theory for groups acting on homogeneous trees. Cambridge University Press. 1991. ISBN 0-521-42444-5.
- Herz, Carl (1994). "Review: Harmonic analysis and representation theory for groups acting on homogeneous trees, by Alessandro Figà-Talamanca and Claudio Nebbia". Bull. Amer. Math. Soc. (N.S.). 31 (2): 271–274. doi:10.1090/S0273-0979-1994-00530-0.
- with Tim Steger: Figà-Talamanca, Alessandro; Steger, Tim (1994). Harmonic analysis for anisotropic random walks on homogeneous trees. Memoirs of the American Mathematical Society. Vol. 110. AMS. doi:10.1090/memo/0531. ISBN 0-8218-2594-1.
