= Keti Tenenblat =

Turkish-Brazilian mathematician

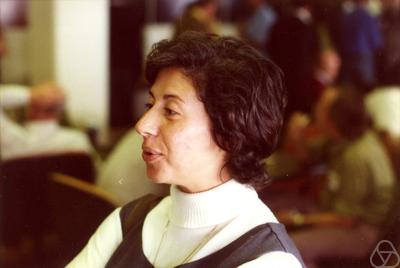
- Tenenblat in Berkeley in 1975
- Born: 27 November 1944 (age 81); İzmir, Turkey
- Scientific career
- Fields: Mathematics

Keti Tenenblat (born 27 November 1944) is a Turkish-Brazilian mathematician working on Riemannian geometry, the applications of differential geometry to partial differential equations, and Finsler geometry. Together with Chuu-Lian Terng, she generalized Backlund theorem to higher dimensions.

== Education ==
Tenenblat was born on 27 November 1944 in İzmir, Turkey, where she attended elementary and junior high school at an Italian school. In 1957, her family emigrated to Brazil. In Rio de Janeiro, she graduated from high school at Bennett College and joined the National Faculty of Philosophy at the University of Brazil (today UFRJ), in the Mathematics Degree.

From 1964 to 1968, she taught mathematics at a secondary school in Rio. She completed her university course in 1967 and began her higher education activities at the Institute of Mathematics of UFRJ in 1968. Between 08/1968 to 07/1969, she attended a master's degree in mathematics at the University of Michigan, USA, while accompanying her husband who was study abroad. Upon returning to Brazil, she returned to teaching at UFRJ and began a doctoral program at IMPA. She defended her doctoral dissertation entitled "An estimate for the length of closed geodesics in Riemannian varieties" in 1972, under the direction of Manfredo P. do Carmo.

== Career ==
From 1973 she joined the faculty of the University of Brasilia (UnB) where she became a Full Professor in 1989. From 1975 to 1978 she pursued a postdoctoral position at the Department of Mathematics at the University of California, Berkeley. During this period, she developed her research under the influence of S. S. Chern and became interested in studying the interaction between differential geometry and differential equations.

After 1978, her visits abroad were short-lived. She was a visiting professor at Yale University, MSRI Berkeley, Institute of Theoretical Physics, Santa Barbara, IMA Minnesota, University of Montreal, McGill University, CRM Montreal, Nankai Institute and Fudan Univ. China.

She is a recipient of Brazil's National Order of Scientific Merit in Mathematics, Emeritus Professor at the University of Brasília, and was President of the Brazilian Mathematical Society in 1989–1991. She has been a member of the Brazilian Academy of Sciences since 1991.

She is also the author of the books Introdução à geometria diferencial (1988), and Transformações de superfícies e aplicações (1981).

== Personal life ==
In 1965, she married Moyses Tenenblat, an engineer who graduated from the National School of Engineering. They had four children: Dany (1970), Nitza (1973), and Leo (1975), and seven grandchildren: Gabriel (1995), Yuri (1998), Luisa (2000), Clara (2005), Milla (2007), Aylou (2009), and Luca (2014).

== Selected publications ==
- Tenenblat, Keti; Terng, Chuu Lian (1980), "Bäcklund's theorem for n-dimensional submanifolds of R^{2n − 1}", Annals of Mathematics, Second Series, 111 (3): 477–490, doi:10.2307/1971105, JSTOR 1971105, MR 0577133
- Chern, S. S.; Tenenblat, K. (1986), "Pseudospherical surfaces and evolution equations", Studies in Applied Mathematics, 74 (1): 55–83, doi:10.1002/sapm198674155, MR 0827492
- Kamran, Niky; Tenenblat, Keti (1996), "Laplace transformation in higher dimensions", Duke Mathematical Journal, 84 (1): 237–266, doi:10.1215/S0012-7094-96-08409-4, MR 1394755
