= Enrique Anderson Imbert =

Novelist, short-story writer and literary critic

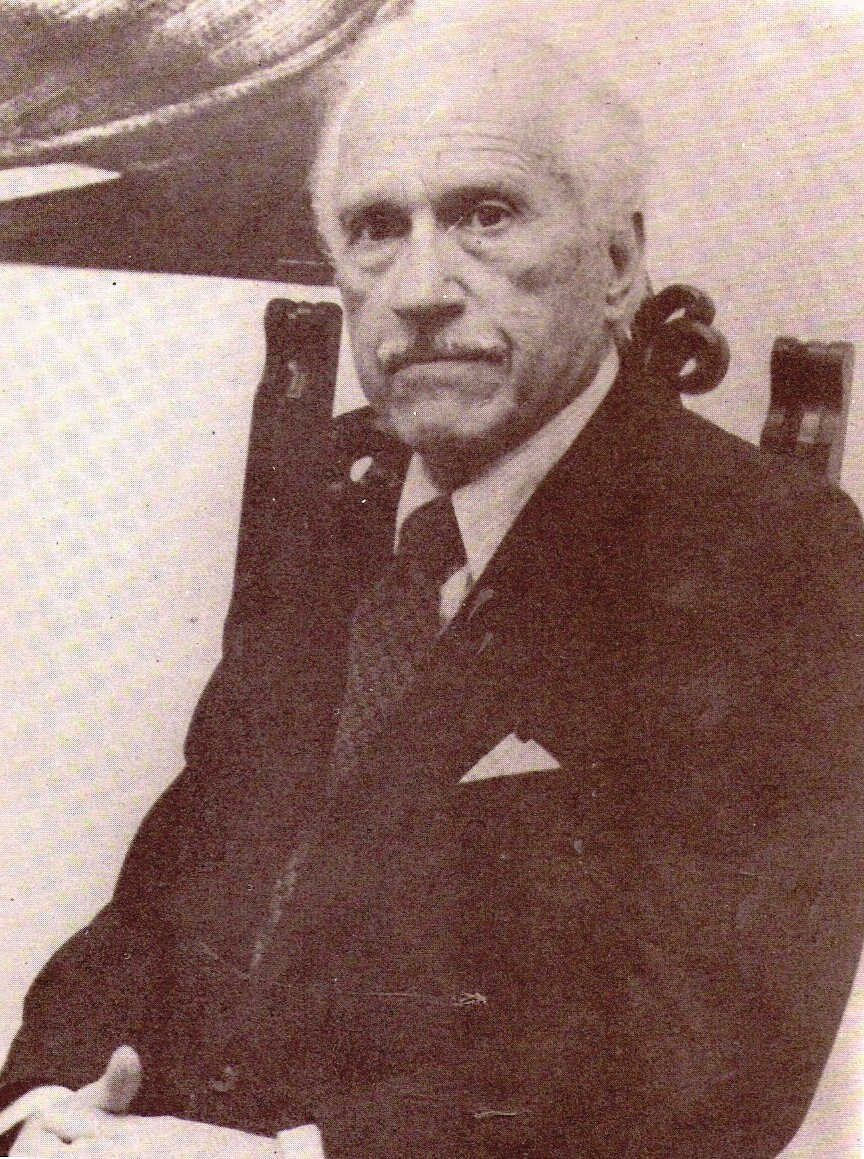
- Imbert in 1980
- Born: February 12, 1910; Córdoba, Argentina
- Died: December 6, 2000 (aged 90); Buenos Aires, Argentina
- Occupations: Writer, Critic, Professor
- Writing career
- Genres: Fantasy, Magical Realism
- Notable works: El Gato de Cheshire, La Prosa

Enrique Anderson Imbert (Note: In this Spanish name, the first or paternal surname is Anderson and the second or maternal family name is Imbert.) (February 12, 1910 – December 6, 2000) was an Argentine novelist, short-story writer and literary critic.

== Life ==
Born in Córdoba, Argentina, in 1910 to José Enrique Anderson and Honorina Imbert, Anderson Imbert graduated from the University of Buenos Aires with a Ph.D. in 1946. From 1940 until 1947 he taught at the University of Tucumán. In 1947, he joined the faculty of the University of Michigan. He was awarded a Guggenheim Fellowship in 1954. He became the first Victor S. Thomas Professor of Hispanic Literature at Harvard University in 1965. Anderson-Imbert remained at Harvard until his retirement in 1980. He was elected a Fellow of the American Academy of Arts and Sciences in 1967 and a member of the Academia Argentina de Letras in 1979.

With his wife, Margot (née Di Clérico), a librarian at Harvard's Widener Library, Anderson Imbert had a son and a daughter. He died on December 6, 2000, in Buenos Aires.

== Work ==
Anderson Imbert is best known for his microcuentos: very brief short stories in which he blends fantasy and magical realism. His story "Sala de espera" is taken from The Cheshire Cat, written in 1965; he is also the author of the 1966 short story entitled "Taboo." He also penned the short stories "El Leve Pedro", "El Fantasma", and "Vudu".

In 2012, the North American Academy of the Spanish Language, of which he was a member, created the "Enrique Anderson Imbert Prize" to recognize the professional trajectory of those who have contributed with their studies, works, and literary works to the knowledge and dissemination of the Spanish language and Hispanic culture in the United States.

== Bibliography ==
=== Essays ===
- La flecha en el aire (1937)
- Ibsen y su tiempo (1946)
- Historia de la Literatura Hispanoamericana (1955), (one vol., many reprintings and amplified into two volumes.)
- Una aventura amorosa de Sarmiento (1969)
- Teoría de cuento (1978)
- La Crítica Literaria y sus Métodos (1979)
- El Realismo Mágico y Otros Ensayos (1979)
- Mentiras y Mentirosos en el Mundo de las Letras (1993)
- La Prosa (1984)
- Nuevos Estudios Sobre Letras Hispanas (1986)
- Reloj de arena (1995)
- Escritor, texto, lector (2001)

=== Narratives ===
- Vigilia (1934)
- El Gato de Cheshire (1965)
- El Grimorio (1969)
- Victoria (1977)
- La Botella de Klein (1978)
- La Locura Juega al Ajedrez (1971)
- Los Primeros Cuentos del Mundo (1978)
- Anti-Story: an Anthology of Experimental Fiction (1971)
- La Sandía
- Consenso de dos (2001)
- Consenso de tres (2002)
