= Kenneth Harwood =

American information theorist

Kenneth A. Harwood (born July 12, 1924) is an American administrator, information and telecommunication theorist and adjunct professor at the University of California Santa Barbara, a former President of the Broadcast Education Association (BEA), known for his work on the general theory of communication, and known as one of the leading scholars of the American radio history.

== Biography ==
Kenneth Harwood was born in Chicago and attended the University of Missouri and received his B.A. in zoology in 1947, his M.A. in speech in 1948 and his Ph.D. in speech in 1950 from the University of Southern California.

While working on his Ph.D., he married Arlette Mary Bartley on January 28, 1949, and he taught at the University of Alabama and the University of Southern California. At the University of Alabama he became Professor and Head of the Department of Radio and Television, and at the University of Southern California he later rose to Chairman for their Department of Telecommunications. He left the University in 1978 to become Director of the newly formed School of Communication at the University of Houston. 1994 he became the director of Interns (California) School of Communication at the University of Houston.

End 1950s he had been among the first members of the Society for General Systems Research. He was on the board of directors for several commercial broadcasters including WFLN in Philadelphia. From 1954 to 1968 he was General Manager at radio station KUSC at the University of Southern California. From 1964 to 1974 he was president of the Oak Kroll Broadcasting Company in Pasadena. From 1971 to 1978 he was chairman of the Broadcast Foundation of California and from 1968 to 1978 director of the Franklin Broadcasting Company.

Harwood has been awarded the Frank Stanton Fellow of the International Radio and Television Society in 1979, and Distinguished Education Service Award of the broadcast Education Association in 1986. Since 1990 the Broadcast Education Association annually awards the "Annual Kenneth Harwood Outstanding Dissertation Award" established by Kenneth Harwood for the outstanding Ph.D. dissertations in broadcasting and electronic media.

== Work ==
=== A general theory of communication ===
In the 1953 article "On a general theory of communication", Harwood presented an overview of the many approaches to the study of human communication and preliminary notes on the formulation of a generalized theory of communication.

== Publications ==
Articles by Kenneth Harwood:

- 1953, "Toward a general theory of communication," with Francis Cartier in: Audiovisual Communication Review, 1953, 1, 227-233.
- 1953, "Cybernetics explained for instructors," with Francis Cartier, in: Air Training and Development Informational Bulletin (1953), 4, 53-56.
- 1953, "On a general theory of communication", with Francis Cartier in: Journal Educational Technology Research and Development, Springer Boston, Issue Volume 1, Number 4 / September, 1953, Pages 227-233.
- 1953, "On definition of communication", with F. A. Cartier in: Journal of Communication, Volume 3 Issue 2 Page 71-75, November 1953
- 1969, "Broadcasting and the Theory of the Firm", in: Law and Contemporary Problems, Vol. 34, No. 3, Communications: Part 2 (Summer, 1969), pp. 485–504
- 1978, "On definition of communication", with K. A. Harwood in: Eileen Hart, Communicating styles for managers. New York, NY: Penton Learning Systems.
- 2004, "When MEDIA ETHICS Began", in: Media Ethics, Fall 2004 (15:1), p. 5.
- 2005, "Television hoaxes ahead", in: Television Quarteley Volume 36
