= Djairo Guedes de Figueiredo =

Brazilian mathematician

Djairo Guedes de Figueiredo (academic signature: D. G. De Figueiredo, born on 2 April 1934, in Limoeiro do Norte) is a Brazilian mathematician noted for his research on differential equations, elliptic operators, and calculus of variations. He is considered the greatest analyst from Brazil. He was the president of the Brazilian Mathematical Society from 1977 to 1979.

Figueiredo is a well-known figure among mathematicians in analysis and differential equations and among Brazilian students in physics, engineering and mathematics. He has received many Brazilian national and international prizes, both for his research in pure mathematics and also for his popular mathematics textbooks (about analysis and differential equations) and expository writing papers. In 1995 he received the National Order of Scientific Merit and in 2004 the title of "Doctor Honoris Causa" from the Federal University of Paraíba.

In 2009, he became a member of the National Academy of Science of Buenos Aires. In 2011, he became the first Brazilian to receive a gold medal from the Telesio-Galilei Academy of Sciences "for his great contribution to Mathematics, especially to the theory of elliptical partial differential equations".

He was a Ph.D. student of Louis Nirenberg at New York University, and is currently a titular professor at UNICAMP, a position he began in 1988.

He is a recipient of Brazil's National Order of Scientific Merit in mathematics (1995). Since 1969 he has been a member of the Brazilian Academy of Sciences.

== Selected papers ==
- D. G. de Figueiredo, P. L. Lions, R. D. Nussbaum. "A priori estimates and existence of positive solutions of semilinear elliptic equations", Journal de Mathématiques Pures et Appliquées, 61, 1982, pp. 41–63.
- D. G. de Figueiredo, P. L. Felmer . "On superquadratic elliptic systems", Transactions of the American Mathematical Society, v. 343, n. 1, 1994, pp. 99–116.
- P. Clément, D. G. de Figueiredo, E. Mitidieri . "Positive solutions of semilinear elliptic systems", Communications in Partial Differential Equations, v. 17, n. 5–6., 1992, pp. 923–940.
- D. G. de Figueiredo, E. Mitidieri . A Maximum Principle for an Elliptic System and Applications to Semilinear Problems, SIAM Journal on Mathematical Analysis, v. 17, n. 4, 1986, pp. 836-849.

The book Selected Papers of Djairo Guedes Figueiredo has been published by Springer, as part of the collection Selected Works of Outstanding Brazilian Mathematicians (Google Preview).

== Books ==
- Análise I (1975, in Portuguese)
- Análise de Fourier e Equações Diferenciais Parciais (1977, in Portuguese)
- Equações Diferenciais Aplicadas (1979, in Portuguese)
- Números Irracionais e Transcendentes (1974, in Portuguese)
- Equações Elípticas não Lineares (1977, in Portuguese)
- Lectures on the Ekeland Variational Principle with Applications and Detours (Springer Verlag, 1989)
