= Paolo Piccione =

Italian mathematician (born 1964)

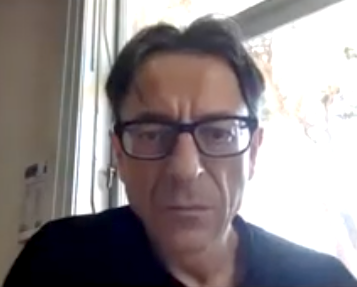
- At an online talk in 2021
- Born: 24 April 1964 (age 62); Rome, Italy
- Education: Sapienza University of Rome (B. Sc. and M.S.); Pennsylvania State University (Ph. D.)
- Scientific career
- Fields: Mathematics
- Workplaces: University of São Paulo
- Thesis: Discrete Regular Subalgebras of Semifinite Von Neumann Algebras (1994)
- Doctoral advisor: Adrian Ocneanu

Paolo Piccione (born 24 April 1964) is an Italian mathematician working in differential geometry, Riemannian geometry and analysis. He is professor at the University of São Paulo since 1996 and president of the Brazilian Mathematical Society since 2017.

== Biography ==
Piccione was born in Rome on 24 April 1964, in a genuinely Italian family – his paternal grandfather was from Sicily; and the maternal one of central Italy – of a social class "without any particular prominence", although he enjoyed the important advances of Italian society in the postwar period, Piccione achieved an education in high-level public schools. Like his parents, three decades before him, he graduated from the same Sapienza University of Rome, in Rome, where he obtained Laurea in Matematica and Master degree in 1987 supervisor by Alessandro Figà Talamanca. He received his a PhD in Mathematics degree from the Pennsylvania State University in 1994 advisor by Adrian Ocneanu.

He is currently a full professor at the Institute of Mathematics and Statistics, University of São Paulo, where he teaches since 1996 and completed his livre docência (Doctor of Law's USP).

== Work ==
His research has emphasis on differential geometry, he works mainly on the following topics: calculus of variations and variational geometric problems, Riemannian and global Lorentzian geometry, Morse theory, symplectic geometry and Hamiltonian systems. Piccione develops research that deals with topics with possible applications to physics. The main results achieved in the area of Lorentzian geometry have an interpretation within general relativity.

== Awards and honors ==
- Brazilian Academy of Sciences, Member (2012)
- Brazilian Mathematical Society, President (2017-)
- National Order of Scientific Merit, Commander (2018)

== Selected publications ==
- jointly with GIAMBO, R.; MAGLI, G., "Naked Singularities Formation in the Gravitational Collapse of Barotropic Spherical Fluids.". General Relativity and Gravitation. vol. 36 (2004), no. 6, pp. 1279–1298.
- jointly with Giambo, R.; Giannoni, F.; MAGLI, G., "New solutions of Einstein equations in spherical symmetry: the Cosmic Censor to the court". Communications in Mathematical Physics. vol. 235 (2003), no. 3, pp. 545–563.
- jointly with Exel, R.; Dokuchaev, M., "Partial Representations and Partial Group Algebras". Journal of Algebra. vol. 226 (2000), no. 1, pp. 505–532.
