= Bulletin of the Brazilian Mathematical Society =

- Discipline: Mathematics
- Language: English
- Edited by: Daniel Pellegrino and Eduardo Teixeira

Publication details
- Former name: Boletim da Sociedade Brasileira de Matemática
- History: 1970-present
- Publisher: Springer Science+Business Media
- Frequency: Quarterly
- Impact factor: 1.246 (2021)

Standard abbreviations
- ISO 4: Bull. Braz. Math. Soc.

Indexing
- ISSN: 1678-7544 (print); 1678-7714 (web)
- LCCN: 2004255047
- OCLC no.: 782073833

Links
- Journal homepage; Journal page at publisher's website; Online archive

The Bulletin of the Brazilian Mathematical Society is a quarterly peer-reviewed scientific journal covering all areas of mathematics. It is the official journal of the Brazilian Mathematical Society and is published on their behalf by Springer Science+Business Media. The journal was established in 1970 as the Boletim da Sociedade Brasileira de Matemática, obtaining its current title in 1989. The Editors-in-Chief are Daniel Pellegrino (Universidade Federal da Paraiba) and Eduardo Teixeira (Oklahoma State University).

== Abstracting and indexing ==
The journal is abstracted and indexed in:

- Current Contents/Physical, Chemical & Earth Sciences
- EBSCO databases
- INIS Atomindex
- MathSciNet
- ProQuest databases
- Science Citation Index Expanded
- Scopus
- Zentralblatt Math

According to the Journal Citation Reports, the journal has a 2020 impact factor of 1.177.
