= Suely Druck =

Brazilian mathematician

Suely Druck is a Brazilian mathematician and two-time president of the Brazilian Mathematical Society.

== Life and work ==
Suely Druck holds a degree in Mathematics from the Federal University of Rio de Janeiro (1970) and a master's degree in Mathematics from the National Institute of Pure and Applied Mathematics Association (1977). She earned her D.Sc. at Pontifical Catholic University of Rio de Janeiro in 1984 under the supervision of Paul Alexander Schweitzer with a dissertation titled, Estabilidade de folhas compactas em folheações dadas por fibrados.

Druck was elected president of the Brazilian Mathematical Society twice, in 2001 and 2003, to two-year terms.

== Selected publications ==
- Druck, Suely, Fuquan Fang, and Sebastiao Firmo. "Fixed points of discrete nilpotent group actions on $ S^ 2$." In Annales de l'institut Fourier, vol. 52, no. 4, pp. 1075-1091. 2002.
- Druck, Suely, and Sebastiao Firmo. "Periodic leaves for diffeomorphisms preserving codimension one foliations." Journal of the Mathematical Society of Japan 55, no. 1 (2003): 13-37.
- Druck, Suely, Ana Catarina Pontone Hellmeister, and Deborah Martins Raphael. "Explorando o ensino da matemática." (2004).
- Druck, Suely. "Educação científica no Brasil: uma urgência." WERTHEIN, Jorge; CUNHA (2005).
