= Brazilian Mathematical Society =

- Formation: July 1969; 57 years ago
- Type: Professional association
- Headquarters: Rio de Janeiro, Rio de Janeiro, Brazil
- Members: 1,600+
- Official language: English, French
- President: Paolo Piccione
- Website: sbm.org.br

The Brazilian Mathematical Society (Portuguese: Sociedade Brasileira de Matemática, SBM) is a professional association founded in 1969 at Instituto de Matemática Pura e Aplicada to promote mathematics education in Brazil.

== Presidents ==
- 1969–1971 Chaim Samuel Honig
- 1971–1973 Manfredo do Carmo
- 1973–1975 Elon Lages Lima
- 1975–1977 Maurício Peixoto
- 1977–1979 Djairo Guedes de Figueiredo
- 1979–1981 Jacob Palis
- 1981–1983 Imre Simon
- 1983–1985 Geraldo Severo de Souza Ávila
- 1985–1987 Aron Simis
- 1987–1989 César Camacho
- 1989–1991 Keti Tenenblat
- 1991–1993 César Camacho
- 1993–1995 Márcio Gomes Soares
- 1995–1997 Márcio Gomes Soares
- 1997–1999 Paulo Domingos Cordaro
- 1999–2001 Paulo Domingos Cordaro
- 2001–2003 Suely Druck
- 2003–2005 Suely Druck
- 2005–2007 João Lucas Marques Barbosa
- 2007–2009 João Lucas Marques Barbosa
- 2009–2011 Hilário Alencar
- 2011–2013 Hilário Alencar
- 2013–2015 Marcelo Viana
- 2015–2017 Hilário Alencar
- 2017–2023 Paolo Piccione
- 2023–2025 Jaqueline Godoy Mesquita

== Awards ==
The SBM distributes many prizes, including the Brazilian Mathematical Society Award and the Elon Lages Lima Award.

== Publications ==
Journals:

- Bulletin of the Brazilian Mathematical Society
- Eureka!
- Matemática Contemporânea
- Ensaios Matemáticos
- Matemática Universitária
- Professor de Matemática Online
- Revista do Professor de Matemática

== See also ==
- Instituto Nacional de Matemática Pura e Aplicada
- Brazilian Mathematics Olympiad of Public Schools
