= Ingrid Kristine Glad =

Norwegian mathematician

Ingrid Kristine Glad (born 1965) is a Norwegian statistician whose research topics have included nonparametric regression, DNA microarray data, and image processing. She is a professor of statistics and data science at the University of Oslo.

== Education and career ==
Glad was born in Oslo. After rebelling against her family by preferring mathematics to language, Glad studied physics and statistics at the Norwegian Institute of Technology. She is married to statistician Arnoldo Frigessi, and followed Frigessi to Italy for postdoctoral research before returning to Norway for her position at the University of Oslo.

As a teenager she worked a stint on a cargo ship, and her later research has also included using statistics to prevent shipping disasters.

In 2022 Glad and Frigessi obtained the founding for the center of excellence (SFF) Integreat.

== Recognition ==
Glad is an Elected Member of the International Statistical Institute. She was elected to the Norwegian Academy of Science and Letters in 2019. Glad is chair of the board of the Abel Prize.
