= Speedskating World =

Speedskating World (SSW) is an international magazine devoted to news and discussions pertaining to speed skating and speedskaters. The magazine is the only English-language publication of its kind, and has had subscribers in more than twenty-five countries. The SSW first saw light in 1995, and typically publishes eight issues a year. It has a broad outlook on speedskating, featuring articles and interviews related to athletes, coaches, politics, sports medicine, training regimes, equipment, statistics, Olympics, championships, history, and the broad fan culture associated with these aspects. Around twenty different Olympic champions have been specially interviewed for the SSW, many of them before they won their medals. The natural emphasis of the SSW is on classical long-track speedskating (where athletes race in pairs on 400-m rinks, against each other and against the clock, exchanging inner and outer lanes on the backstretch), but some space is also devoted to short track and marathon skating races. It is published and printed in the Netherlands, by its chief editor Irene Postma, but is truly international in outlook and operation.

The magazine took a halt after the 2005–2006 season, but has come back as of January 2007 as an online magazine.
