= Imbert Prize =

- Awarded for: Awarded for the development of ideas for the advancement of risk and security management in the UK
- Country: United Kingdom
- Presented by: Association of Security Consultants
- First award: 2005
- Website: http://www.securityconsultants.org.uk

The Imbert Prize was instituted in 2005, and is awarded annually by the Association of Security Consultants (ASC) for the development of ideas for the advancement of risk and security management in the UK.

The prize consists of three categories:

1. Best academic dissertation
2. Most notable contribution in the security industry in the preceding year
3. The ASC member that has made the most significant contribution to independent security consultancy.

The prize is named after Lord Imbert, a patron of the ASC, who was Commissioner of Scotland Yard 1987–1993, and was a prominent figure in debates about security and policing. Though known for his involvement in the wrongful arrests of the Guildford Four he was credited for his management of Thames Valley Police and improvements of the Metropolitan Police Service that were indicative of his continual efforts to modernise British law enforcement.

The annual prize is judged by senior figures from the UK policing, security, military and intelligence communities from dissertations selected by university faculty.

== Imbert Prize recipients ==
Year	Academic dissertation	Industry contribution	Independent consultancy
2005	Bob Ralph (University of Portsmouth)	Sallyann Baldry (Edexcel)	Mike Collier
2006	Chris J. Finch (Cranfield University)	David Burrill OBE (BAT Industries)	Mike Cahalane
2007	David Cresswell (Leicester University)	Peter French (SSR Personnel)	Maurice Parsons
2008	Ted Antonopoulos (Cranfield University)	Stuart Lowden (Wilson James)	John Benton
2009	Anders Groenli (Cranfield University)	David Dickinson (British Security Industry Association)	Graham Seaby
2010	Danie Adendorff (Loughborough University)	David Evans (British Security Industry Association/2012)	Jack Case
2011	Paul Rollinson (University of Portsmouth)	James Willison (ASIS International)	Mike Tennent (Tavcom Training)
2012	Graham Smaul (University of Leicester)	Allison Wylde (ASIS International)	-
2013	Iain Gibson (Cranfield University)	Don Randall MBE (Bank of England) and Baroness Ruth Henig CBE DL	Mike Bluestone CSyP (Corps Security)
2014		Peter Finch (NAHS)	Joe Connell
2015	Peter Finch (Bucks New University)	Mike White (IPSA)	Roger Noakes
2016	Matthew Fitton (Cranfield University)	Professor Martin Gill (ASIS & SySl)	Bob Martin
2017	Dan Husbands (St Andrews University)		Warren Collins

== See also ==
- The Security Institute
