= Kenneth Harwood Outstanding Dissertation Award =

The Kenneth Harwood Outstanding Dissertation Award is an academic prize awarded each year by the Broadcast Education Association for the best doctoral dissertation in field of broadcasting and electronic media. The prize was established by Kenneth Harwood, Professor at the University of Houston and a former President of the BEA. The award offers $1,000 for the outstanding Ph.D. dissertation in broadcasting and electronic media. The award was established through gifts started by Professor Harwood and a donation from a friend of BEA.|

== Award winners ==
Year	Title	Author	University	Source
2015	"Constructing and performing an on-air radio identity in a changing media landscape."	David F. Crider	State University of New York at Oswego	
2014	"From Ephermal to Legitimate: An Inquiry Into Television's Material Traces in Archival Spaces, 1950s to 1970s."	Lauren Bratslavsky	University of Oregon	
2013	"First year students in a foreign fabric: A triangulation study on Facebook as a method of coping/adjustment."	Shane Tilton	Ohio University	
2012	"The Impact of Federal Communications Commission Practices on Communication Policy Making 2001-2004: An Investigation of the Policy Shift From Public Service Idealism to Market Forces Pragmatism"	Beth C. Fratkin	University of Utah	
2011	“Viral Viewers: Examining Parasocial Interaction on Local TV News Web Sites”	Joy Chavez Mapaye	University of Alaska, Anchorage	
2010	"Rescuing Men: The New Television Masculinity in 'Rescue Me,' 'Nip/Tuck,' 'The Shield,' 'Boston Legal' and 'Dexter.' "	Pamela Hill Nettleton	Marquette University	
2009	"The Sounds of 'Radio': A Cultural History of Radio's Aesthetic Definition as a Broadcast Medium for Aural Communications in 1920s America."	Shawn VanCour	University of Wisconsin	
2008	“Department Stores and the Origins of American Broadcasting, 1910–1931”	Ronald J. “Noah” Arceneaux	University of Georgia	
2007	"Children's cognitive processing of internet advertising"	Mary McIlrath	University of California, Santa Barbara	
2006	"How Violence and Frustration in Video Games Affect Aggression"	Kevin D. Williams	University of Georgia	
2004	“Radio, community and identity in South Africa: A rhizomatic study of Bush Radio in Cape Town”	Tanja Estella Bosch	Ohio University	
2003	"Localism, Community, and Commercial Television, 1948-1960: A Value Analysis."	John Armstrong	University of California at Berkeley	
2002	"Radio’s Development in Rural America."	Jacob J. Podber	Ohio University	
2001	"The Role of Motivation in Policy Considerations Addressing Television Violence"	Paul Haridakis	Kent State University	
2000	"Interactivity and the 'Cyber-Fan': An Exploration of Audience Involvement Within the Electronic Fan Culture of the Internet."	Vic Costello	University of Tennessee	
1999	“Controlling Technology: Internet Service Providers and Copyright Liability.”	Matt Jackson	Indiana University	
1997	"Information and Markets and the Market for Information: An Analysis of the Market for Television Audiences"	Patricia F. Phalen	Northwestern University	
1996	"Broadcast Law and Segregation: A Social History of the WLBT-TV Case"	Steven D. Classen	University of Wisconsin	
1994	"The paradox of public: The public and the public interest in communication technology regulation in the United States, 1934 - 1988."	Michael Edward Lenert	The University of Texas	
1992	"The market dynamics of the U.S. television syndication industry : an examination of its regulatory environment and market competition, 1980-1990"	Sylvia Menghua Chan-Olmsted	University of Michigan	
1991	"A Case Study of Federal Communications Commission Docket 21313: 'In the Matter of AM Stereophonic Broadcasting'."	Mark Jerome Braun	University of Minnesota	
