= Arnoldo Frigessi =

Italian statistician

Arnoldo Frigessi di Rattalma (born 1959) is an Italian statistician based in Norway, where he is a professor at the Department of Biostatistics (now called Oslo Centre for Biostatistics and Epidemiology) with the Institute of Basic Medical Research at the University of Oslo. He has also a position at the Oslo University Hospital and is affiliated with the Norwegian Computing Centre. He led the centre Statistics for Innovation, which was created in 2007 as one of 14 designated national centres for research-based innovation, funded by the Norwegian Research Council, until 2014. Frigessi succeeded in obtaining funding for a second centre of the same type, BigInsight, which started in 2014 and will operate for 8 years, again under his leadership. Frigessi develops new methods in statistics and machine learning and stochastic models to study principles, dynamics and patterns of complex dependence. His approach is often Bayesian and computationally intensive. He has developed theory for Markov Chain Monte Carlo methods, inferential methods for pair copula constructions, methods for the analysis of multiple genomic data types, the first digital twin of a breast tumor useful for personalised treatment. His work has been central to the national response to the COVID-19 pandemics in Norway, as a key member of the modelling group at the National Intritute of Public Health of Norway.

Frigessi is a fellow of the Norwegian Academy of Technological Sciences. and was elected member of the Norwegian Academy of Science and Letters in 2008. In 2021 he received the Sverdrup Prize from the Norwegian Statistical Association, elected Fellow of the Institute of Mathematical Statistics and is knighted Cavaliere Ordine al Merito della Repubblica Italiana. He is married to Ingrid Glad and has two children, Simon and Ada.
