= Michel Imbert =

French neuropsychologist (1935–2026)

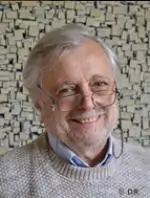
- Born: 29 June 1935; Béziers, France
- Died: 19 February 2026 (aged 90)
- Scientific career
- Fields: Neuropsychology
- Institutions: Collège de France

Michel Imbert (29 June 1935 – 19 February 2026) was a French neuropsychologist teacher-researcher in cognitive neurosciences, professor emeritus at Pierre-et-Marie-Curie University (from 2003) and honorary director of studies at the École des hautes études en sciences sociales (EHESS).

== Life and career ==
After studies at the Sorbonne, in philosophy (licentiate in 1957) and psychology (licentiate in 1958), and at the Faculty of Sciences in Paris (licentiate in natural sciences, 1961, doctorate in natural sciences, 1967), Michel Imbert was a lecturer (2nd class professor) at the Faculty of Sciences in Toulouse (1967). Returning to Paris in 1972 as assistant director at the Collège de France in the chair of Neurophysiology headed by Professor Yves Laporte, Michel Imbert was appointed Professor of Neurophysiology at the Paris-Sud University at Orsay (1981), then at the University Pierre-et-Marie-Curie (1983). In 1987, he was appointed director of studies at the École des hautes études en sciences sociales (EHESS); he created the Master (DEA) in Cognitive Sciences, which has since become a master's degree (Cogmaster). In 1993, he created the Brain and Cognition Research Centre (CERCO) at the Paul-Sabatier University in Toulouse, a joint University-CNRS-EHESS unit, of which he was director until 2000.

Elected senior member at the Institut universitaire de France (IUF), he has been an honorary member of the Perceptive Systems Laboratory (LSP) at the Institut d'Étude de la Cognition at the École normale supérieure since 2003.

Imbert was also a member of the Academia Europaea (from 1989) and a corresponding member of the French Academy of sciences (from 1993).

Imbert died on 19 February 2026, at the age of 90.

== Functions and distinctions ==
- Deputy scientific director in the life sciences department of the CNRS (1976–1980).
- Executive secretary and treasurer of the International Brain Research Organization (IBRO 1984–1991).
- Chairman of the Scientific Council of the Biology Department of the École normale supérieure (2001–2005).

== Scientific contributions ==
At the end of the 1950s, Michel Imbert demonstrated, with Pierre Buser, the existence of a convergence of visual, auditory and somesthesic signals at the level of the pre-central cortex in cats. He also established that visual signals can bypass the primary visual cortex to reach extra-striated areas directly.

He carried out his first work on the post-natal development of the visual system at the Collège de France in the chair of neurophysiology, of which he was the deputy director. He established that neurons selective to the orientation of a visual stimulus are present in the primary visual cortex prior to any visual experience. He demonstrates that extra-ocular proprioceptive afferents play a determining role in the development of properties previously considered exclusively visual, and, in the primate, he establishes that the coding of three-dimensional vision is dependent on oculomotor vergence signals.

Contrary to what was then generally accepted, retinal afferents are not distributed in the kneeling body and the lateral superior colliculus in distinct layers according to competitive mechanisms assigning their place to the axons of the ganglion cells originating from each eye. In mice enucleated in utero, the areas of the target structures of the optic fibers, left vacant by enucleation, are not completely reoccupied by those from the remaining eye. Thus, despite the absence of competition, the related fibres occupy the areas intended to receive them without completely re-inverting the previously deafferented areas. He shows that in anophthalmic mice (C57-An) the relationship between the kneeling body and the visual cortex follows a topographical order that does not differ fundamentally from the "retinotopic" order of the normal mouse, despite the absence of both retinas.

In a New World monkey (Callithrix jacchus), he analyzed the post-natal development of ocular dominance columns accompanied by variations in the distribution of NMDAR1 receptors in the granular layers and inhomogeneity in cortical microvascularization.

== Awards and honours ==
- Antoine-Lacassagne Prize of the Collège de France (1979)
- Laureate of the French Academy of sciences, Montyon Prize for Physiology (1982)
- Visiting Research Fellow, Experimental Psychology, University of Oxford (1992)

== Books ==
- 1964: Histophysiologie des synapses et neurotransmission (de Robertis, traduit de l’anglais – Paris, Gauthier-Villars)
- 1975: Neurophysiologie fonctionnelle. Avec P. Buser (Paris, Hermann)
- 1982: Psychophysiologie Sensorielle. Avec P. Buser (Paris, Hermann)
- 1986: Audition. Neurophysiologie Fonctionnelle III. Avec P. Buser (Paris, Hermann)
- 1986: Vision. Neurophysiologie Fonctionnelle IV. Avec P. Buser (Paris, Hermann)
- 1987: Cognitive sciences in Europe. Avec P. Bertelson, R. Kempson et D. Osherson (Berlin, Springer)
- 1992: Audition (English revised edition) The MIT Press
- 1992: Vision (English revised edition) The MIT Press
- 1993: Mécanismes fondamentaux et centres nerveux. Avec P. Buser (Paris, Hermann).
- 1994: Commandes et régulations neuro-végétatives. Avec P. Buser (Paris, Hermann).
- 2006: Traité du cerveau (Paris, Odile Jacob)
- 2019: La fin du regard éclairant. Paris, Éditions philosophiques Vrin (parution septembre 2019)
