= Congonhinhas =

Municipality in Southern Brazil

Coordinates: 23°33′S 50°33′W

- Municipality
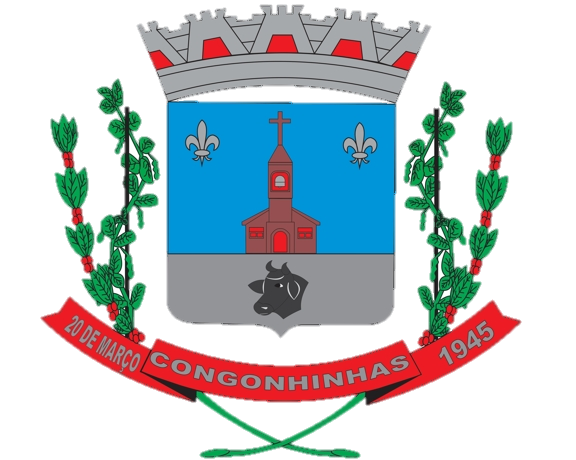
- Coat of arms
- Interactive map of Congonhinhas
- Country: Brazil
- Region: Southern
- State: Paraná
- Mesoregion: Norte Pioneiro Paranaense

Population (2020)
  - Total: 8,857
- Time zone: UTC−3 (BRT)

Congonhinhas is a municipality in the state of Paraná in the Southern Region of Brazil.

== See also ==
- List of municipalities in Paraná
