= Worshipful Company of Security Professionals =

Livery company of the City of London

- Motto: Res Homines Libertates
- Date of formation: 1999 (full livery granted 2008, Royal Charter granted 2010)
- Company association: Security professionals
- Order of precedence: 108th
- Master of company: Wesley Harper
- Website: http://www.wcosp.org

The Worshipful Company of Security Professionals (WCoSP) is the 108th Livery Company of the City of London. It is a not for profit membership organisation.

It was formed in 1999, when Steve Neville and John Purnell registered the Guild of Security Professionals with the City of London Chamberlain's Office.

In 2009 the Security Professionals' Company petitioned the privy council for a royal charter and Queen Elizabeth II approved an Order instructing the Lord Chancellor to affix the great seal to the Worshipful Company's charter, which was granted on 15 February 2010.

More recent developments include the development of an Apprentices scheme which now has around 30 Apprentices.

== Register of Chartered Security Professionals ==
The Worshipful Company of Security Professionals were awarded the exclusive right to establish a Register of Chartered Security Professionals under the terms of the Royal Charter granted by the Privy Council on 15 February 2010. The Company started work to establish a Chartered Security Professionals(CSyP) scheme in June 2010, and the first ten Chartered Security Professionals were admitted in June 2011.

== The Worshipful Company of Security Professionals Charitable Trust ==
The Worshipful Company of Security Professionals Charitable Trust was formed as a Charity on 21 March 2001 and is registered with the Charity Commission under number 1088658. It is a charitable organisation providing education and health services to members of the security profession.
