= Scandinavian Journal of Statistics =

- Discipline: Statistics
- Language: English
- Edited by: Xavier de Luna, Aila Särkkä, Rolf Larsson

Publication details
- History: 1974–present
- Publisher: John Wiley & Sons
- Frequency: Quarterly
- Impact factor: 1.2 (2025)

Standard abbreviations
- ISO 4: Scand. J. Stat.

Indexing
- CODEN: SJSADG
- ISSN: 0303-6898 (print); 1467-9469 (web)
- LCCN: 75647213
- OCLC no.: 909877530

Links
- Journal homepage; Online access; Online archive

The Scandinavian Journal of Statistics is a quarterly peer-reviewed scientific journal of statistics. It was established in 1974 by four Scandinavian statistical learned societies. It is published by John Wiley & Sons and the editors-in-chief are Rolf Larsson (Uppsala University), Xavier de Luna (Umeå University) and Aila Särkkä (Chalmers University of Technology and University of Gothenburg). According to the Journal Citation Reports, the journal has a 2025 impact factor of 1.2, ranking it 92nd out of 170 journals in the category "Statistics & Probability".

== Editors ==
A historical list of editors since the inception of the journal.

- 1974–1985 Bengt Rosén (Sweden)
- 1986–1990 Søren Johansen (Denmark)
- 1991–1994 Elja Arjas (Finland)
- 1995–1997 Dag Tjøstheim (Norway)
- 1998–2000 Steffen L. Lauritzen (Denmark)
- 2001–2003 Lennart Bondesson (Sweden)
- 2004–2005 Thomas Scheike (Denmark)
- 2006–2009 Ørnulf Borgan, Bo Lindqvist (Norway)
- 2010–2012 Juha Alho, Paavo Salminen (Finland)
- 2013–2015 Holger Rootzén, Mats Rudemo (Sweden)
- 2016–2018 Peter Dalgaard, Niels Richard Hansen (Denmark)
- 2019–2021 Håkon K. Gjessing, Hans J. Skaug (Norway)
- 2022–2024 Sangita Kulathinal, Jaakko Peltonen, Mikko J. Sillanpää (Finland)
