= Tore Schweder =

Norwegian statistician (1943–2024)

Tore Schweder (16 January 1943 – 9 May 2024) was a Norwegian statistician and was a professor at the Department of Economics and at the Centre for Ecology and Evolutionary Synthesis at the University of Oslo. Schweder had worked with scientists in a number of fields, including medicine, demography, sociology, economics, ecology, genetics and fisheries. Since 1990, most of his applied work has been concerned with assessment of marine resources (fish and whales), and with the problem of uncertainty in fisheries management. His methodological research interests also include basic connections between likelihood and confidence, cf. confidence distributions.

Schweder was a member of the Scientific Committee of the International Whaling Commission since 1989, and was an elected member of the Norwegian Academy of Science and Letters. He was the 2011 recipient of the Sverdrup Prize. In April 2013, his wide-ranging contributions to the theory and applications of statistics were honoured by a Statistics Day at the Academy of Sciences.

Schweder died on 9 May 2024, at the age of 81.
