= Prêmio Almirante Álavaro Alberto =

Prêmio Almirante Álvaro Alberto (Admiral Álvaro Alberto Award) is an award given annually by the National Council for Scientific and Technological Development (CNPq), linked to the Ministry of Science and Technology (Brazil).

The award is given through a partnership between the Ministry of Science and Technology, CNPq and Fundação Conrado Wessel. According to the National Research Council of Brazil, it provides encouragement and recognition to Brazilian researchers for their career's work advancing the progress of science, and knowledge transfer from academia to the productive sector.

It is awarded annually, in rotation, to one of the major knowledge areas: Life Sciences, Exact Sciences, Earth and Engineering, and Humanities and Social Sciences, or Arts and Letters. The award does not accept applications for its selection process. The recipient selected receives a diploma, medal and R$150,000 (Brazilian Reals), an amount granted by Fundação Conrado Wessel, in a public ceremony held at the Brazilian Academy of Sciences (ABC), in Rio de Janeiro.
