= Phyllis Franklin Award =

Triennial prize awarded by the Modern Language Association

The Phyllis Franklin Award is a triennial prize given to an academic by the Modern Language Association.

== Notable winners ==
Past winners of the prize include:

2016 - Anna Deavere Smith

2013 - John Sayles

2010 - Terry Gross

2007 - Richard J. Franke

2005 - William G. Bowen

2003 - Edward M. Kennedy
