= Dag Tjøstheim =

Norwegian statistician (born 1945)

- Born: September 19, 1945 (age 80)
- Education: Princeton University Ph.D.
- Scientific career
- Fields: statistician
- Doctoral advisor: John B. Thomas

Dag Tjøstheim (born 19 September 1945) is a Norwegian statistician.

He took the cand.real. degree at the University of Bergen in 1970, and the PhD degree at Princeton University. He then worked at NORSAR. He was appointed docent at the Norwegian School of Economics in 1977, and in 1980 he became professor in statistics at the University of Bergen. He has edited the journal Scandinavian Journal of Statistics. He is a member of the Norwegian Academy of Science and Letters. In 2009, Tjøstheim was the first ever recipient of the Sverdrup Prize.

Among his collaborators was the late Clive Granger, winner of the Nobel Memorial Prize in Economic Sciences in 2003.

Tjøstheim is married, and has three sons.

== See also ==
- Tjøstheim’s Coefficient
