= ASIS International =

Professional organization

ASIS International, headquartered in Alexandria, Virginia, is a professional organization for security professionals. It issues certifications, standards, and guidelines for the security profession.

Founded in 1955 as the American Society for Industrial Security (ASIS), members were principally government and corporate security professionals. The term "industrial security" denotes U.S. Department of Defense contracts with U.S. industry for defense technology and materials. The organization officially changed its name in 2002 to ASIS International to reflect its international expansion, which currently includes 34,600 members in 155 countries and 240 local chapters in 89 countries worldwide, the Annual ASIS Fact Sheet contains additional information. The name "American Society for Industrial Security" no longer exists except in historical legal documents.

As of 2018, the annual educational and networking event hosted by ASIS is referred to as the "Global Security Exchange (GSX). This event is centered on education sessions, networking opportunities and an exhibit hall showcasing over 450 security vendors.

The ASIS Foundation offers security professionals certification scholarships, practical research, member hardship grants, and more.

== Certification programs ==
ASIS administers four professional certification programs - "Certified Protection Professional" (CPP), "Professional Certified Investigator" (PCI), "Physical Security Professional" (PSP) and the "Associate Protection Professional" (APP) designation.
