= List of Shakespeare in the Park productions at the Delacorte Theater =

The Public Theater has produced over 120 plays and musicals at the Delacorte Theater in New York City's Central Park since the theater's opening in 1962. Currently the series is produced under the brand Free Shakespeare in the Park, and all productions are staged at the Delacorte. In past decades, the series was branded The New York Shakespeare Festival and encompassed productions at both the Delacorte and the Public's downtown location in the former Astor Library.

Henry VIII, staged in 1997, was celebrated as the final work of the Shakespearean canon to be performed as part of the series, but within productions staged at the Delacorte, Macbeth was not performed until 2006 and, as of yet, the three parts of Henry VI have not been performed except as the heavily abridged Wars of the Roses in 1970.

With the 2022 season, As You Like It joined Measure for Measure, Twelfth Night, and Much Ado About Nothing as the most-performed works, each having been produced six times (including musical adaptations).

== Productions before the Delacorte ==
All plays are by William Shakespeare. Except as noted, all productions were staged in Central Park on or adjacent to the site of the future Delacorte Theater.

Year	Work performed	Director	Notable cast members	Ref.
1956	Julius Caesar (Note: production staged at the East River Park amphitheater)	Stuart Vaughan	J. D. Cannon, Walter Massey (Note: Massey was replaced by Vaughn for the final two performances)	
1956	The Taming of the Shrew	Stuart Vaughan	J. D. Cannon, Colleen Dewhurst	
1957	Romeo and Juliet	Stuart Vaughan	Stephen Joyce, Bryarly Lee Robert Blackburn, Roscoe Lee Browne, J. D. Cannon, Hal England, Edwin Sherin, Jerry Stiller	
1957	The Two Gentlemen of Verona	Stuart Vaughan	Robert Blackburn, Paul Stevens J. D. Cannon, Hal England, Robert Gerringer, Anne Meara, Jerry Stiller	
1957	Macbeth	Stuart Vaughan	Roy Poole J. D. Cannon, Colleen Dewhurst, Hal England, Robert Gerringer, John McLiam, Anne Meara, Jerry Stiller	
1958	Othello	Stuart Vaughan	Peter Bogdanovich, Steven Gilborn, Ellen Holly, George Morfogen, Edwin Sherin, Paul Shyre	
1959	Julius Caesar	Stuart Vaughan	Franklin Cover, Staats Cotsworth, Rex Everhart, Ernest Graves, John Harkins, John Heffernan, Donald Madden	
1960	Henry V	Joseph Papp	Tom Aldredge, Ed Asner, Roberts Blossom, Roger C. Carmel, Barry Dennen, James Earl Jones, Raymond St. Jacques, Kathleen Widdoes, Louis Zorich	
1960	The Taming of the Shrew	Gerald Freedman	Barbara Ann Barrie, Joseph Bova, J. D. Cannon, Roger C. Carmel, John Heffernan, Christina Pickles Frederic Warriner, Jane White	
1961	Much Ado About Nothing	Joseph Papp	J. D. Cannon, Nan Martin, Philip Sterling	
1961	A Midsummer Night's Dream	Joel J. Friedman	Jonathan Farwell, James Earl Jones, Patricia Routledge, Kathleen Widdoes	
1961	Richard II	Gladys Vaughan	J. D. Cannon, James Earl Jones	

== Productions at the Delacorte ==
All plays are by William Shakespeare except as noted.

Year	Work performed	Director	Notable cast members	Ref.
1962	The Merchant of Venice	Joseph Papp & Gladys Vaughan	Nan Martin, George C. Scott Bette Henritze, Ken Jenkins, James Earl Jones, Richard Jordan, Robert Kidd, Michael Lombard, Lee Richardson	
1962	The Tempest	Gerald Freedman	Paul Stevens James Earl Jones, Richard Jordan, Abe Vigoda, Kathleen Widdoes	
1962	King Lear	Joseph Papp & Gladys Vaughan	Frank Silvera Roscoe Lee Browne, Don Harron, Bette Henritze, Michael Higgins, Lee Richardson	
1963	Antony and Cleopatra	Joseph Papp	Colleen Dewhurst, Michael Higgins William H. Bassett, Peggy Feury, Bill Gunn, Bette Henritze, Ramon Bieri, Ellen Holly, Michael Moriarty	
1963	As You Like It	Gerald Freedman	Paula Prentiss Richard Benjamin, John Crawford, Charles Durning, Penny Fuller, George Hearn John Heffernan, Richard Jordan, Michael Moriarty, Mitchell Ryan, Sam Waterston	
1963	The Winter's Tale	Gladys Vaughan	Mitchell Ryan Roscoe Lee Browne, Dixie Carter, Charles Durning, Salome Jens, James Earl Jones, Michael Moriarty	
1964	Hamlet	Joseph Papp	Robert Burr, Alfred Ryder (Note: The production opened with the role of Hamlet played by Ryder, but when he contracted laryngitis Papp hired Burr, who had recently played Hamlet on Broadway, to fill the role. Papp subsequently dismissed Ryder rather than permit him to return upon recovery.) Staats Cotsworth, Howard Da Silva, Robin Gammell, Julie Harris, Stacy Keach, Nan Martin, Michael M. Ryan, Joseph Stern	
1964	Othello	Gladys Vaughan	James Earl Jones, Mitchell Ryan Julienne Marie	
1964	Electra (Note: by Sophocles, English translation by H. D. F. Kitto)	Gerald Freedman	Lee Grant Olympia Dukakis, David Hurst, Florence Stanley	
1965	Love's Labour's Lost	Gerald Freedman	Richard Jordan Tom Aldredge, Rae Allen, Joseph Bova, William Bogert, Michael Moriarty, John Pleshette, Paul Stevens, Jane White	
1965	Coriolanus	Gladys Vaughan	Robert Burr, Staats Cotsworth William Devane, Leonard Jackson, James Earl Jones, Michael McGuire, Mitchell Ryan, Jane White	
1965	Troilus and Cressida	Joseph Papp	Flora Elkins, Richard Jordan Tom Aldredge, Humbert Allen Astredo, Joseph Bova, Roscoe Lee Browne, Al Freeman Jr., James Earl Jones, Michael McGuire, Michael Moriarty, Paul Steven, John Vernon, Jane White	
1966	All's Well That Ends Well	Joseph Papp	Barbara Barrie George Bartenieff, Georg Stanford Brown, J. D. Cannon, Staats Cotsworth, Charles Durning; Al Freeman Jr., Paul Hecht, Bette Henritze, Richard Jordan, Joanna Roos, Marlene Warfield	
1966	Measure for Measure	Michael Kahn	Shepperd Strudwick	
1966	Richard III	Gerald Freedman	Joseph Bova Philip Bosco, Penny Fuller, George Hearn, Paul Hecht, Nan Martin, John Pleshette, Jane Rose, Charles Siebert, Richard Thomas, Harris Yulin	
1967	The Comedy of Errors	Gerald Freedman	David Birney, Josep Bova, Charles Durning, Julienne Marie	
1967	King John	Joseph Papp	Robert Burr, Harris Yulin David Birney, Staats Cotsworth, Charles Durning, Mark Jenkins, Michael McGuire, Gregory Sierra, Clarence Williams III, Marian Winters	
1967	Titus Andronicus	Gerald Freedman	David Birney, Olympia Dukakis, Charles Durning, Moses Gunn, Raul Julia	
1968	Henry IV, Part I (Note: two parts of Henry IV performed alternating nights in repertory, with marathon performances given on three Saturdays)	Gerald Freedman	Stephen Elliott, Penny Fuller, George Hearn, Stacy Keach, Stephen McHattie, Barry Primus, Joseph Stern, Sam Waterston	
1968	Henry IV, Part II	Gerald Freedman	Stephen Elliott, Penny Fuller, George Hearn, Stacy Keach, Stephen McHattie, Barry Primus, Joseph Stern, Sam Waterston	
1968	Romeo and Juliet	Joseph Papp	Susan McArthur, Martin Sheen Tom Aldredge, Joseph Bova, William Duell, Moses Gunn, Charlotte Rae, Eleanor Stewart	
1969	Peer Gynt (Note: by Henrik Ibsen, English translation by Michael Meyer)	Gerald Freedman	Stacy Keach Judy Collins, Olympia Dukakis, John Heffernan, Estelle Parsons	
1969	Twelfth Night	Joseph Papp	Tom Aldredge, Stephen Collins, Jennifer Darling, Charles Durning, Stephen Elliott, Peter Simon, Ralph Waite	
1970	The Wars of the Roses (Note: abridgment of 1 Henry VI, 2 Henry VI, 3 Henry VI, and Richard III; adapted by John Barton) (Note: performed as three plays in repertory with marathon performances given on two Saturdays)	Stuart Vaughan	Charles Durning, Robert Gerringer, Bette Henritze, Patrick Hines, Donald Madden, Leon Russom, Drew Snyder, Paul Sparer	
1971	Timon of Athens	Gerald Freedman	Shepperd Strudwick Michael Dunn	
1971	Two Gentlemen of Verona (Note: musical adaptation of The Two Gentlemen of Verona; book by John Guare and Mel Shapiro, lyrics by Guare and music by Galt MacDermot)	Mel Shapiro	Raul Julia, Carla Pinza, Jerry Stiller	
1971	Cymbeline	A.J. Antoon	Tom Aldredge, Karen Grassle William Devane, Stuart Pankin, Stephen Schnetzer, Norman Snow, Joseph Stern, Sam Tsoutsouvas, Christopher Walken, Sam Waterston, Jane White	
1972	Hamlet	Gerald Freedman	Stacy Keach Ramon Bieri, Colleen Dewhurst, James Earl Jones	
1972	Ti-Jean and His Brothers (Note: by Derek Walcott)	Derek Walcott		
1972	Much Ado About Nothing	A. J. Antoon	Barnard Hughes, Sam Waterston, Douglass Watson, Kathleen Widdoes	
1973	As You Like It	Joseph Papp	Kathleen Widdoes Luis Ávalos, Susan Browning, David Clennon, Frederick Coffin, Frankie Faison, Albert Hall, John Harkins, Mary Beth Hurt, Raul Julia, Meat Loaf, Will Mackenzie, Bill McIntyre, Douglass Watson	
1973	King Lear	Edwin Sherin	James Earl Jones Rene Auberjonois, Raul Julia, Paul Sorvino	
1974	Pericles, Prince of Tyre	Edward Berkeley	Randall Duk Kim Dimitra Arliss, Armand Assante, Lenny Baker, Graham Brown, Carole Cole, Barnard Hughes, Mary Beth Hurt, Kenneth Marshall, Charlotte Moore, Helen Stenborg, Ted Swetz	
1974	The Merry Wives of Windsor	David Margulies	Barnard Hughes Lenny Baker, Joseph Bova, Frederick Coffin, Danny DeVito, Richard Hamburger, Cynthia Harris, George Hearn, David Hurst, Kenneth McMillan, Marcia Rodd, Jaime Sánchez, Marilyn Sokol, Michael Tucker	
1975	Hamlet	Michael Rudman	Sam Waterston Ruby Dee, John Lithgow, Andrea Marcovicci	
1975	The Comedy of Errors	John Pasquin	Larry Block, Blair Brown, Leonardo Cimino, Christopher Jones, Linda Lavin, Don Scardino, Michael Tucker	
1976	Henry V	Joseph Papp	Paul Ryan Rudd William Hurt, Michael Moriarty, Jay O. Sanders, Meryl Streep	
1976	Measure for Measure	John Pasquin	Sam Waterston John Cazale, Jay O. Sanders, Meryl Streep, Jeffrey Tambor	
1977	The Threepenny Opera (Note: by Bertolt Brecht and Kurt Weill, English translation by Ralph Manheim and John Willett)	Richard Foreman	Philip Bosco, Roy Brocksmith, William Duell, Ellen Greene, Marc Jordan, Caroline Kava, David Sabin, Jack Eric Williams	
1977	Agamemnon (Note: by Aeschylus, English translation by Edith Hamilton)	Andrei Șerban	Gloria Foster, Ron O'Neal, Dianne Wiest	
1978	All's Well That Ends Well	Wilford Leach	Pamela Reed Dennis Boutsikaris, Joel Brooks, Frances Conroy, John A. Ferraro, George Guidall, Mark Linn-Baker, Larry Pine, Remak Ramsay, Deborah Rush, Barbara Williams, Elizabeth Wilson, Richard Zobel	
1978	The Taming of the Shrew	Wilford Leach	Raul Julia, Meryl Streep Joel Brooks, George Guidall, Anthony Holland, Larry Pine, Deborah Rush, Nicholas Woodeson, Richard Zobel	
1979	Coriolanus	Wilford Leach	Morgan Freeman, Maurice Woods Robert Christian, Gloria Foster, Earle Hyman, J.J. Johnson, C.C.H. Pounder	
1979	Othello	Wilford Leach	Richard Dreyfuss, Raul Julia Caitlin Clarke, Frances Conroy, Keith David, James Greene, Michael Gross, John Heard, Kaiulani Lee, Mark Linn-Baker, Bruce McGill, James Rebhorn, Margaret Whitton	
1980	The Pirates of Penzance (Note: by Gilbert and Sullivan)	Wilford Leach	Kevin Kline	
1981	The Tempest	Lee Breuer	Raul Julia David Marshall Grant, Steven Keats, Carl Lumbly, Barry Miller, Lola Pashalinski, Bill Raymond, Louis Zorich	
1981	Henry IV, Part I	Des McAnuff	Larry Block, Philip Casnoff, Philip Craig, John Goodman, Val Kilmer, Kenneth McMillan, Mandy Patinkin, Rex Robbins, Raphael Sbarge, Kevin Spacey, John Vickery, Todd Waring, Robert Westenberg, Margaret Whitton, Max Wright	
1982	Don Juan (Note: play by Molière; English-language translation by Donald M. Frame)	Richard Foreman	Roy Brocksmith, John Seitz Jere Burns, Clarence Felder, Andreas Katsulas, Melissa Leo, Christopher McCann, Kelly McGillis, Deborah Offner, Laurence Overmire, Pamela Payton-Wright, Jack Stehlin, Margaret Whitton	
1982	A Midsummer Night's Dream	James Lapine	Christine Baranski, William Hurt	
1983	Richard III	Jane Howell	Kevin Kline Ivar Brogger, Reg E. Cathey, Maurice Copeland, Steven Culp, Richard Greene, David Alan Grier, Peter Francis James, Christopher McCann, Terry O'Quinn, Madeleine Potter, Ving Rhames, Marian Seldes, Concetta Tomei	
1983	Non Pasquale (Note: English-language adaptation of Donizetti's Don Pasquale; musical adaptation by William Elliott, new libretto by Nancy Heikin and Anthony Giles from an adaptation by Tito Schipa Jr. and Gianni Marchetti)	Wilford Leach	Joe Grifasi, Ron Leibman, Carolyn Dennis, Priscilla Lopez	
1984	Henry V	Wilford Leach	Kevin Kline Richard Backus, George Guidall, Paul Guilfoyle, Anthony Heald, Dan Hedaya, Earl Hindman, Brian Jackson, Jeffrey Jones, Erik Ki La Salle, Adam LeFevre, Mary Elizabeth Mastrantonio, Robert MacNaughton, Peter McRobbie, Kristin Nelson, John Pankow, Larry Pine, Robert Schenkkan, Jack Stehlin, David Warshofsky	
1984	The Golem (Note: by H. Leivick, English translation by J.C. Augenlicht)	Richard Foreman	F. Murray Abraham Larry Block, Bette Henritze, Mark Margolis, Christopher McCann, Clark Middleton, Moultrie Patten, Randy Quaid, Joseph Wiseman	
1985	Measure for Measure	Joseph Papp	John Getz Reg E. Cathey, Rosemary De Angelis, Antonio Fargas, Richard Jordan, Nathan Lane, Tom Mardirosian, Mary Elizabeth Mastrantonio, Elizabeth Perkins, Robert Stanton, John Wylie	
1985	The Mystery of Edwin Drood (Note: musical by Rupert Holmes based on the novel The Mystery of Edwin Drood by Charles Dickens)	Wilford Leach	Betty Buckley, George Rose Patti Cohenour, Joe Grifasi, Cleo Laine, Howard McGillin, Jana Schneider, Larry Shue	
1986	Twelfth Night	Wilford Leach	F. Murray Abraham, Tony Azito, Ashley Crow, Meagen Fay, Thomas Gibson, Kim Greist, Tim Guinee, Perry Lang, Jordan Lund, Peter MacNicol, Marco St. John	
1986	Medea (Note: by Euripides, performed in Japanese translation)	Yukio Ninagawa	Mikijirō Hira	
1987	Richard II	Joseph Papp	Peter MacNicol Tom Aldredge, Denis Arndt, Rocky Carroll, Freda Foh Shen, Tim Guinee, Thomas Hill, Victor Love, Marian Seldes, Tony Shalhoub, Marco St. John	
1987	The Two Gentlemen of Verona	Stuart Vaughan	Thomas Gibson, James M. Goodwin, Elizabeth McGovern Dylan Barker, Larry Block, John Pankow, Wendell Pierce, Roxanne, Deborah Rush	
1987	Henry IV, Part I	Joseph Papp	Donald Moffat, Tony Shalhoub	
1987	Titus Andronicus (Note: canceled due to the death of the director)	Charles Ludlam		
1988	Much Ado About Nothing	Gerald Freedman	Dylan Baker, Andre Braugher, Dan Butler, Phoebe Cates, Blythe Danner, George Hall, Kevin Kline, Robert Gerringer, Brian Murray, David Hyde Pierce, William Preston, Jerry Stiller, Kate Wilkinson	
1988	King John	Stuart Vaughan	Kevin Conway, Jay O. Sanders Andre Braugher, Michael Cumpsty, Moses Gunn, Mariette Hartley, Michael Louden, Jordan Lund, Joe Morton, Richard Venture, Jane White	
1989	Twelfth Night	Harold Guskin	John Amos, Bill Camp, Jeff Goldblum, Gregory Hines, Mary Elizabeth Mastrantonio, Michelle Pfeiffer, Fisher Stevens	
1989	Titus Andronicus	Michael Maggio	Donald Moffat Bill Camp, Robert Curtis-Brown, Keith David, Don Harvey, Kate Mulgrew, David Purdham, Rainn Wilson	
1990	Richard III	Robin Phillips	Denzel Washington Mary Alice, David Aaron Baker, Daniel Davis, Virginia Downing, Seth Gilliam, Peter McRobbie, Philip Moon, Tim Blake Nelson, Jeffrey Nordling, Sam Tsoutsouvas, Jake Weber	
1990	The Taming of the Shrew	A. J. Antoon	Morgan Freeman, Tracey Ullman Helen Hunt	
1991	Othello	Joe Dowling	Raul Julia, Christopher Walken Liev Schreiber, Jeffrey Wright	
1991	A Midsummer Night's Dream (Note: Portuguese translation)	Cacá Rosset	Rubens Caribé, Ary França, Cacá Rosset, Christiane Tricerri	
1992	As You Like It	Adrian Hall	Elizabeth McGovern Larry Bryggman, Siobhan Fallon, Richard Libertini, Kathryn Meisle, Donald Moffat, George Morfogen, Kristine Nielsen, Brad Sullivan	
1992	The Comedy of Errors	Cacá Rosset	Larry Block, Karla Burns, Elizabeth Franz, Boyd Gaines, John Michael Higgins, Peter Jacobson, Marisa Tomei	
1993	Measure for Measure	Michael Rudman	Lisa Gay Hamilton, Kevin Kline Andre Braugher, Karla Burns, Ken Cheeseman, Hope Davis, Lanny Flaherty, Peter Francis James, Tom Mardirosian, Ethan Phillips, Ruben Santiago-Hudson, Blair Underwood	
1993	All's Well That Ends Well	Richard Jones	Miriam Healy-Louie Vivienne Benesch, Michael Cumpsty, Joel de la Fuente, Bette Henritze, Klea Scott, Rocco Sisto, Henry Stram, Michael Stuhlbarg	
1994	The Merry Wives of Windsor	Daniel Sullivan	Brian Murray David Alan Grier, George Hall, Andrea Martin, Miguel Perez, Tonya Pinkins	
1994	The Two Gentlemen of Verona	Adrian Hall	Joel de la Fuente, Malcolm Gets, Lisa Gay Hamilton	
1995	The Tempest	George C. Wolfe	Patrick Stewart Teagle F. Bougere, Larry Bryggman, Kamar de los Reyes, Aunjanue Ellis, Neal Huff, Bill Irwin, John Pankow, Carrie Preston, Nestor Serrano, Liev Schreiber	
1995	Troilus and Cressida	Mark Wing-Davey	Neal Huff, Elizabeth Marvel Bill Camp, Paul Calderón, Catherine Kellner, Boris McGiver, Tim Blake Nelson, Stephen Spinella, Henry Stram, Tamara Tunie	
1996	Henry V	Doug Hughes	Andre Braugher Teagle F. Bougere, Christian Camargo, Torquil Campbell, Kathleen Chalfant, Jarlath Conroy, Elizabeth Marvel, Jerry Mayer, George Morfogen, Daniel Oreskes, Henry Stram, Jeff Weiss	
1996	Timon of Athens	Brian Kulick	Michael Cumpsty Geoffrey Owens, Henry Stram, Jack Stehlin, Sam Tsoutsouvas	
1997	Henry VIII	Mary Zimmerman	Ruben Santiago-Hudson Jayne Atkinson, Larry Bryggman, Bette Henritze, Marin Hinkle, Julia McIlvaine, Josef Sommer	
1997	On the Town (Note: music by Leonard Bernstein and book and lyrics by Betty Comden and Adolph Green)	George C. Wolfe	Lea DeLaria, Jesse Tyler Ferguson, Jonathan Freeman, Annie Golden, Jose Llana, Mary Testa, Chandra Wilson	
1998	Cymbeline	Andrei Șerban	Stephanie Roth Haberle Hazelle Goodman, Michael C. Hall, Randall Duk Kim, George Morfogen, Liev Schreiber, Robert Stanton	
1998	The Skin of Our Teeth (Note: by Thornton Wilder)	Irene Lewis	Frances Conroy, John Goodman, Kristen Johnston, Novella Nelson, John Ortiz, Lola Pashalinski	
1999	The Taming of the Shrew	Mel Shapiro	Allison Janney, Jay O. Sanders Erika Alexander, Mario Cantone, Reg E. Cathey, Peter Jacobson, Tom Mardirosian, Olga Merediz, Max Wright	
1999	Tartuffe (Note: by Molière, English translation by Richard Wilbur)	Mark Brokaw	Dylan Baker, Danielle Ferland, Dana Ivey, Charles Kimbrough, Curtis McClarin, Wendell Pierce, J. Smith-Cameron, Mary Testa	
2000	The Winter's Tale	Brian Kulick	Keith David Aunjanue Ellis, Jonathan Hadary, Bronson Pinchot, Henry Stram, Michael Stuhlbarg, Erica Tazel	
2000	Julius Caesar	Barry Edelstein	Dennis Boutsikaris, David McCallum, Jamey Sheridan Ritchie Coster, Jeffrey Wright	
2001	Measure for Measure	Mary Zimmerman	Joe Morton Billy Crudup, Felicity Jones, Sanaa Lathan, John Pankow, Daniel Pearce, Daniel Pino, Christopher Evan Welch	
2001	The Seagull (Note: by Anton Chekhov, English translation by Tom Stoppard)	Mike Nichols	Philip Seymour Hoffman, Kevin Kline, Natalie Portman, Meryl Streep John Goodman, Marcia Gay Harden, Debra Monk, Larry Pine, Stephen Spinella, Christopher Walken	
2002	Twelfth Night	Brian Kulick	Zach Braff, Kristen Johnston, Christopher Lloyd, Oliver Platt, Jimmy Smits, Julia Stiles, Michael Stuhlbarg	
2003	Henry V	Mark Wing-Davey	Liev Schreiber David Costabile, Peter Gerety, Nicole Leach, Daniel Pearce, Bronson Pinchot, Steven Rattazzi	
2004	Much Ado About Nothing	David Esbjornson	Kristen Johnston, Jimmy Smits, Sean Patrick Thomas, Sam Waterston	
2005	As You Like It	Mark Lamos	Lynn Collins Jennifer Dundas, Michael Esper, Jennifer Ikeda, Richard Thomas, James Waterson	
2005	Two Gentlemen of Verona (Note: revival of 1971 production)	Kathleen Marshall	Rosario Dawson, Renée Elise Goldsberry, Oscar Isaac, Norm Lewis	
2006	Macbeth	Moisés Kaufman	Liev Schreiber Sterling K. Brown, Jennifer Ehle, Pedro Pascal	
2006	Mother Courage and Her Children (Note: by Bertolt Brecht, English translation by Tony Kushner with music by Jeanine Tesori)	George C. Wolfe	Kevin Kline, Jenifer Lewis, Austin Pendleton, Meryl Streep	
2007	A Midsummer Night's Dream	Daniel Sullivan	Keith David, Jesse Tyler Ferguson, Tim Blake Nelson, Martha Plimpton, Laila Robins, Jay O. Sanders	
2007	Romeo and Juliet	Michael Greif	Lauren Ambrose, Oscar Isaac Brian Tyree Henry, Camryn Manheim, Austin Pendelton, Christopher Evan Welch	
2008	Hair (Note: book and lyrics by James Rado and Gerome Ragni and music by Galt MacDermot)	Diane Paulus	Jonathan Groff, Patina Miller, Will Swenson, Karen Olivo	
2008	Hamlet	Oskar Eustis	Michael Stuhlbarg Lauren Ambrose, Andre Braugher, Kevin Carroll, Margaret Colin, David Harbour, Hoon Lee, Sam Waterston	
2009	The Bacchae (Note: by Euripides, English translation by Nicholas Rudall and featuring original music by Philip Glass)	JoAnne Akalaitis	Jonathan Groff, Anthony Mackie George Bartenieff, André De Shields, Rocco Sisto	
2009	Twelfth Night	Daniel Sullivan	Charles Borland, Michael Cumpsty, Raúl Esparza, Anne Hathaway, Hamish Linklater, Audra McDonald, David Pittu, Jay O. Sanders, Stark Sands, Julie White	
2010	The Merchant of Venice	Daniel Sullivan	Al Pacino, Lily Rabe Jesse Tyler Ferguson, Shalita Grant, Heather Lind, Hamish Linklater, Jesse L. Martin	
2010	The Winter's Tale	Michael Greif	Ruben Santiago-Hudson Happy Anderson, Gerry Bamman, Linda Emond, Jesse Tyler Ferguson, Shalita Grant, Bill Heck, Marianne Jean-Baptiste, Heather Lind, Hamish Linklater, Jesse L. Martin, Nyambi Nyambi, Max Wright	
2011	All's Well That Ends Well	Daniel Sullivan	Annie Parisse Kristen Connolly, John Cullum, Michael Hayden, André Holland, Jordan Lund, Dakin Matthews, Tonya Pinkins, Lorenzo Pisoni, Reg Rogers	
2011	Measure for Measure	David Esbjornson	Lorenzo Pisoni Kristen Connolly, John Cullum, Danai Gurira, Michael Hayden, André Holland, Jordan Lund, Dakin Matthews, Annie Parisse, Tonya Pinkins, Reg Rogers	
2012	As You Like It	Daniel Sullivan	Lily Rabe Andre Braugher, David Furr, Renée Elise Goldsberry, Omar Metwally, Oliver Platt, Stephen Spinella	
2012	Into The Woods (Note: music and lyrics by Stephen Sondheim and book by James Lapine)	Timothy Sheader	Amy Adams, Donna Murphy, Denis O'Hare	
2013	The Comedy of Errors	Daniel Sullivan	Jesse Tyler Ferguson, Hamish Linklater De'Adre Aziza	
2013	Love's Labour's Lost, A New Musical (Note: adaptation of Love's Labour's Lost; music and lyrics by Michael Friedman and book by Alex Timbers)	Alex Timbers	Daniel Breaker, Rachel Dratch, Patti Murin	
2014	Much Ado About Nothing	Jack O'Brien	Lily Rabe, Hamish Linklater, Pedro Pascal	
2014	King Lear	Daniel Sullivan	John Lithgow Annette Bening, Jeremy Bobb, Steven Boyer, Jessica Collins, Glenn Fleshler, Jessica Hecht, Chukwudi Iwuji, Clarke Peters, Jay O. Sanders, Eric Sheffer Stevens	
2015	The Tempest	Michael Greif	Sam Waterston Louis Cancelmi, Jesse Tyler Ferguson, Frank Harts, Charles Parnell, Chris Perfetti, Cotter Smith, Bernard White	
2015	Cymbeline	Daniel Sullivan	Hamish Linklater, Lily Rabe Kate Burton, Raúl Esparza, Jacob Ming-Trent, Patrick Page	
2016	The Taming of the Shrew	Phyllida Lloyd	Cush Jumbo, Janet McTeer Donna Lynne Champlin, Judy Gold, LaTanya Richardson Jackson, Adrienne C. Moore, Anne L. Nathan, Gayle Rankin	
2016	Troilus and Cressida	Daniel Sullivan	Andrew Burnap, Ismenia Mendes Zach Appelman, Louis Cancelmi, (Note: replacing David Harbour, who sustained an injury during a performance) Max Casella, John Glover, Bill Heck, Miguel Perez, Corey Stoll	
2017	Julius Caesar	Oskar Eustis	Gregg Henry, Corey Stoll, John Douglas Thompson Tina Benko, Eisa Davis, Nikki M. James, Elizabeth Marvel	
2017	A Midsummer Night's Dream	Lear deBessonet	Annaleigh Ashford, De'Adre Aziza, Kyle Beltran, Danny Burstein, Shalita Grant, Kristine Nielsen, Richard Poe, Phylicia Rashad	
2018	Othello	Ruben Santiago-Hudson	Chukwudi Iwuji, Corey Stoll Heather Lind, Miguel Perez, Alison Wright	
2018	Twelfth Night (Note: musical adaptation by Kwame Kwei-Armah and Shaina Taub)	Oskar Eustis & Kwame Kwei‑Armah	Shuler Hensley, Nikki M. James, Jacob Ming-Trent, Shaina Taub	
2019	Much Ado About Nothing	Kenny Leon	Danielle Brooks, Chuck Cooper, Jeremie Harris	
2019	Coriolanus	Daniel Sullivan	Teagle F. Bougere, Jonathan Cake Kate Burton, Louis Cancelmi, Jonathan Hadary, Thomas Kopache	
2020	Richard II (Note: production canceled due to the COVID-19 pandemic; reformated as a four-part radio drama)	Saheem Ali		
2020	As You Like It (Note: musical adaptation by Shaina Taub and Laurie Woolery) (Note: production canceled due to the COVID-19 pandemic; rescheduled for 2022)	Laurie Woolery	Darius de Haas, Joel Perez, Shaina Taub	
2021	Merry Wives (Note: adaptation of The Merry Wives of Windsor by Jocelyn Bioh)	Saheem Ali	Jacob Ming-Trent Shola Adewusi, Gbenga Akinnagbe, Kyle Scatliffe, Susan Kelechi Watson	
2022	Richard III	Robert O'Hara	Danai Gurira Sanjit De Silva, Michael Potts, Heather Alicia Simms, Ali Stroker, Daniel J. Watts	
2022	As You Like It	Laurie Woolery	Rebecca Naomi Jones Ato Blankson-Wood, Darius de Haas, Joel Perez, Shaina Taub	
2023	Hamlet	Kenny Leon	Ato Blankson-Wood Daniel Pearce, Solea Pfeiffer, John Douglas Thompson, Lorraine Toussaint	
2023	The Tempest (Note: A musical adaptation with songs by Benjamin Velez)	Laurie Woolley	Renée Elise Goldsberry, Naomi Pierre	
2024	Delacorte Theater closed for renovations			
2025	Twelfth Night	Saheem Ali	Lupita Nyong'o, Khris Davis, Sandra Oh, Junior Nyong'o, Peter Dinklage, Moses Sumney, John Ellison Conlee, Daphne Rubin-Vega, Jesse Tyler Ferguson, b, Joe Tapper, and Kapil Talwalkar	
2026	Romeo and Juliet	Saheem Ali	Daniel Bravo Hernández, Ra'Mya Latiah Aikens, Deirdre O'Connell, Francis Jue, Glenn Fleshler, LaChanze, Caleb Joshua Eberhardt, Zack Lopez Roa, Ariyan Kassam, Martin K. Lewis, Jason Manuel Olazábal, Mariand Torres, and Jessica Pimentel	
2026	The Winter's Tale	Daniel Sullivan	Raúl Esparza, Lily Rabe, Gilbert Owuor, Marsha Stephanie Blake, Daniel Kyri, Isabela Ferrer, Teagle F. Bougere, Steven Skybell, Chuck Cooper, Michael Khalid Karadsheh, Matthew Eby, Alex Hernandez, Matt E. Russell, Jennifer Mogbock, and Aubie Merrylees	
