= Sergei Treil =

Russian mathematician

Sergei Raimondovich Treil (or Treil'; Сергей Раймондович Треиль) is a Russian mathematician, specializing in analysis.

At Leningrad State University (now named Saint Petersburg State University), Sergei R. Treil graduated in mathematics in 1982 with an M.Sc. and in 1985 with a Ph.D. His Ph.D. thesis, dealing with geometric aspects of Hankel operators and Toeplitz operators, was supervised by Nikolai Kapitonovich Nikolski. From 1986 to 1989 Treil was an assistant professor at the Baikonur branch of the Moscow Aviation Institute (MAI). From 1989 to 1991 he was a researcher at the laboratory of theoretical cybernetics at Leningrad University. In Michigan State University's department of mathematics, he was from 1991 to 1992 a visiting assistant professor, from 1992 to 1994 an assistant professor, from 1994 to 1998 he was an associate professor, and from 1998 to 1999 a full professor. In Brown University's department of mathematics, he was from 2000 to 2001 an associate professor and was appointed in 2001 a full professor. He was a visiting scholar in 1990 at the Mittag-Leffler Institute, where he worked with Alexandre Megretski of the KTH Royal Institute of Technology. Treil was in autumn 1998 a visiting professor at Massachusetts Institute of Technology's department of electrical engineering and computer science.

Treil has done important research in the intersection of operator theory, complex analysis, and harmonic analysis. Much of his research is on problems related to applied mathematics, such as control theory, stationary random processes, signal processing, and wavelets. His research interest include Hankel operators, Toeplitz operators, functional models of operators, spectral decompositions of operators, spectral theory of matrix- and operator-valued functions, the Corona problem, and the interplay between operator theory and complex geometry.

In 1993 Treil was awarded the Salem Prize. He wrote several papers with Alexander Volberg and Fedor Nazarov, who were his colleagues at Michigan State University. Volberg shared the 1988 Salem Prize with Jean-Christophe Yoccoz. Nazarov won the 1999 Salem Prize.

== Selected publications ==
- Nazarov, F.; Treil, S. (1996). "The hunt for a Bellman function: applications to estimates for singular integral operators and to other classical problems of harmonic analysis". Algebra i Analiz. 8 (5): 32–162. -- St. Petersburg Math. J., vol. 8, issue 5, 1997, pp. 721–824, paper id 736. mathnet.ru
- Nazarov, F.; Treil, S.; Volberg, A. (1997). "Weak type estimates and Cotlar inequalities for Calderón-Zygmund operators in non-homogeneous spaces". arXiv:math/9711210. (over 350 citations)
- Nazarov, F.; Treil, S.; Volberg, A. (1999). "The Bellman functions and two-weight inequalities for Haar multipliers". Journal of the American Mathematical Society. 12 (4): 909–928. arXiv:math/9711209. doi:10.1090/S0894-0347-99-00310-0. (over 350 citations)
- Nazarov, F.; Treil, S.; Volberg, A. (2001). "Chapter 10. Bellman function in stochastic control and harmonic analysis". In Borichev, A.A.; Nikolski, N.K. (eds.). Systems, Approximation, Singular Integral Operators, and Related Topics. Operator Theory: Advances and Applications. Vol. 129. Birkhäuser, Basel. pp. 393–423. doi:10.1007/978-3-0348-8362-7_16. ISBN 978-3-0348-9534-7.
- Nazarov, F.; Treil, S.; Volberg, A. (2002). "Accretive system Tb-theorems on nonhomogeneous spaces". Duke Mathematical Journal. 113 (2): 259–312. doi:10.1215/S0012-7094-02-11323-4.
- Nazarov, F.; Treil, S.; Volberg, A. (2003). "The Tb-theorem on non-homogeneous spaces". Acta Mathematica. 190 (2): 151–239. doi:10.1007/BF02392690. (over 450 citations) preprint
- Hytönen, Tuomas; Pérez, Carlos; Treil, Sergei; Volberg, Alexander (2014). "Sharp weighted estimates for dyadic shifts and the A_{2} conjecture". Journal für die Reine und Angewandte Mathematik. 2014 (687): 43–86. arXiv:1010.0755. doi:10.1515/crelle-2012-0047.
