= Dmitry Chelkak =

Russian mathematician

Dmitry Sergeevich Chelkak
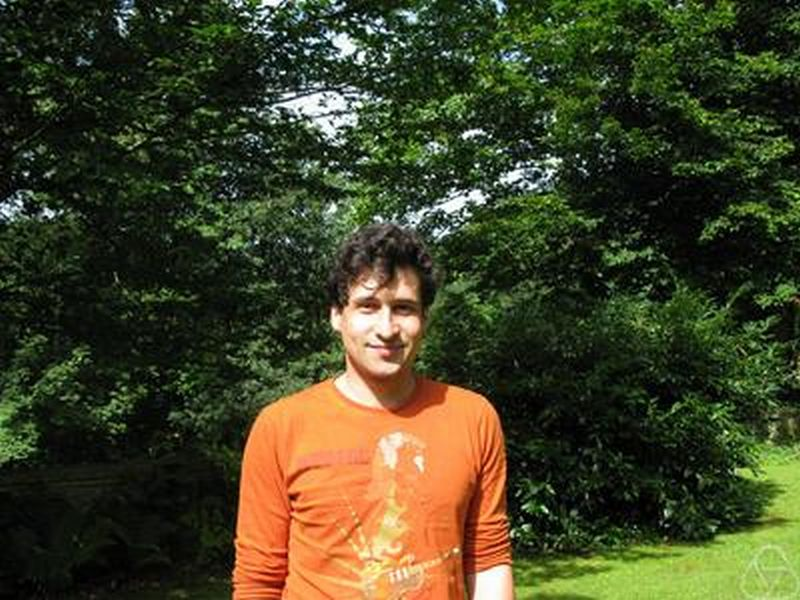
- Chelkak in Oberwolfach, 2008
- Education: Steklov Institute (Ph.D.); Saint Petersburg State University
- Awards: Salem Prize (2014)
- Scientific career
- Workplaces: University of Michigan
- Thesis: Characterization of Spectral Data for the Harmonic Oscillator Perturbed by a Potential with a Finite Energy (2003)
- Doctoral advisor: Pavel Petrovich Kargaev; Evgeny Leonidovich Korotyaev

Dmitry Sergeevich Chelkak (Russian: Дмитрий Сергеевич Челкак; born January 1979 in Leningrad) is a Russian-American mathematician.

Chelkak graduated from Saint Petersburg State University in 1995 with a diploma in 2000 and received his doctorate in 2003 from the Steklov Institute in Saint Petersburg. In 2000 he was with an Euler scholarship in Heidelberg and later in Potsdam. He is a senior researcher at the Steklov Institute in Saint Petersburg and was also a lecturer at the Saint Petersburg State University from 2004 to 2010 and at the Chebyshev Laboratory from 2010 to 2014. He was from 2014 to 2015 at ETH Zurich and from 2015 to 2016 a visiting professor in Geneva.

His research deals with conformal invariance of two-dimensional lattice models at criticality, specifically the Ising models of statistical mechanics, in which he showed universality and conformal invariance at criticality with the Fields medalist Stanislav Smirnov. Chelkak also does research on spectral theory, especially inverse spectral problems of one-dimensional differential operators.

In 1995 he received the gold medal at the International Mathematical Olympiad. In 2004 he was awarded the "Young Mathematician" Prize of the St. Petersburg Mathematical Society. In 2008 he received the Pierre Deligne Prize in Moscow. In 2014 he received the Salem Prize. In 2018 was an invited speaker at the International Congress of Mathematicians in Rio de Janeiro with talk Planar Ising model at criticality: state-of-the-art and perspectives.

== Selected publications ==
- Chelkak, D.; Kargaev, P.; Korotyaev, E. (2004). "Inverse Problem for Harmonic Oscillator Perturbed by Potential, Characterization". Communications in Mathematical Physics. 249 (1): 133–196. Bibcode:2004CMaPh.249..133C. doi:10.1007/s00220-004-1105-8. S2CID 119850806.
- Chelkak, D.; Korotyaev, E. (2006). "Spectral estimates for Schrödinger operators with periodic matrix potentials on the real line". International Mathematics Research Notices. 2006 60314. arXiv:math/0508568. doi:10.1155/IMRN/2006/60314. S2CID 17678384.
- Chelkak, D.; Korotyaev, E. (2009). "Weyl–Titchmarsh functions of vector-valued Sturm–Liouville operators on the unit interval". Journal of Functional Analysis. 257 (5): 1546–1588. arXiv:0808.2547. doi:10.1016/j.jfa.2009.05.010. S2CID 16767606.
- Chelkak, D.; Smirnov, S. (2011). "Discrete complex analysis on isoradial graphs". Advances in Mathematics. 228 (3): 1590–1630. arXiv:0810.2188. doi:10.1016/j.aim.2011.06.025. S2CID 15161035.
- Chelkak, D.; Smirnov, S. (2012). "Universality in the 2D Ising model and conformal invariance of fermionic observables". Inventiones Mathematicae. 189 (3): 515–580. arXiv:0910.2045. Bibcode:2012InMat.189..515C. doi:10.1007/s00222-011-0371-2. S2CID 54789807.
- Chelkak, D.; Cimasoni, D.; Kassel, A. (2017). "Revisiting the combinatorics of the 2D Ising model". Annales de l'Institut Henri Poincaré D. 4 (3): 309–385. arXiv:1507.08242. Bibcode:2017AIHPD...4..309C. doi:10.4171/AIHPD/42. S2CID 116918297.
