= Stylianos Pichorides =

Greek mathematician

Stylianos Konstantinos Pichorides (Στυλιανός Κωνσταντίνος Πιχωρίδης, 18 October 1940, Athens – 18 June 1992, Madrid) was a Greek mathematician, specializing in harmonic analysis.

After graduating from secondary school in Athens, Pichorides matriculated at the National Technical University of Athens, where he graduated in 1963 with a degree in electrical engineering. He then worked as an electrical engineer in Athens, but also studied mathematics and received in 1968 a scholarship to study at the University of Chicago. There in 1971 he received his Ph.D. with thesis On the best values of the constants in the theorems of M. Riesz, Zygmund and Kolmogorov written under the supervision of Antoni Zygmund. In 1972 Pichorides returned to Athens and worked at the National Centre of Scientific Research "Demokritos", where he was employed until 1983, with interruptions by leave of absence. He was from 1974 to 1979 an attaché de recherché of the CNRS in Orsay, a visiting professor from 1979 to 1980 at the Paris-Sud University in Orsay, and from 1980 to 1981 a visiting professor at the University of California, Los Angeles. He organized, with Nicholas Petridis and Nicholas Varopoulos, a successful conference on harmonic analysis in Iraklion in 1978. From 1983 until his death in 1992, Pichorides was a professor at the University of Crete's mathematics department, which he co-founded. He held visiting professorships at Paris-Sud University in Orsay, Caltech, and the University of Chicago. For the academic year 1991–1992 he was a visiting professor at the University of Cyprus. He had short stays at the Mittag-Leffler Institute, the University of Cambridge, Brown University, and the University of Chicago. He died unexpectedly while attending a conference in Spain in 1992.

Pichorides is known for results on inequalities in the theory of Fourier series. In 1980 he received the Salem Prize for his research on Littlewood's conjecture on a lower bound for averaged exponential sums. Research by Pichorides and others provided the basis for the 1981 proof by Sergei Vladimirovich Konyagin of Littlewood's conjecture on the lower bound.

The Foundation for Research & Technology – Hellas (FORTH) has funded the Pichorides Postgraduate Scholarship and the Pichorides Distinguished Lectureship.

== Selected publications ==
- Pichorides, S. K. (1974). "A lower bound for the L^{1} norm of exponential sums". Mathematika. 21 (2): 155–159. doi:10.1112/S0025579300008536.
- Pichorides, S. K. (March 1977). "A remark on exponential sums" (PDF). Bulletin of the American Mathematical Society. 83 (2): 283–285. doi:10.1090/S0002-9904-1977-14308-5.
- Pichorides, S. K. (1977). Norms of exponential sums. Publications mathématiques d'Orsay 73. Paris: Université de Paris-Sud. pp. iv+65 pages. catalog entry, Universiteits bibliotheek, Ghent, Belgium
- Pichorides, S.K. (1977). "On a Conjecture of Littlewood Concerning Exponentials Sums, I.". Δελτίο της Ελληνικής Μαθηματικής Εταιρίας. 18: 8–16. (Bulletin of the Hellenic Mathematical Society)
- Pichorides, S.K. (1978). "On a Conjecture of Littlewood Concerning Exponentials Sums, II". Δελτίο της Ελληνικής Μαθηματικής Εταιρίας. 19: 274–277.
- Pichorides, Stylianos K. (1980). "On the L^{1} norm of exponential sums" (PDF). Annales de l'Institut Fourier. 30 (2): 79–89. doi:10.5802/aif.785.
- Pichorides, Stylianos K. (1992). "A remark on the constants of the Littlewood-Paley inequality" (PDF). Proceedings of the American Mathematical Society. 114 (3): 787–789. doi:10.1090/S0002-9939-1992-1088445-6.
