= Ricardo Pérez =

Ricardo Pérez may refer to:

- Ricardo Pérez (boxer) (born 1991), Mexican boxer
- Ricardo Pérez (Colombian footballer) (born 1973)
- Ricardo Perez (darts player) (born 1988), Spanish darts player
- Ricardo Pérez Godoy (1905–1982), general of the Peruvian army and president of Peru
- Ricardo Pérez Manrique (born 1947), Uruguayan lawyer and judge
- Ricardo Pérez-Marco (born 1967), Spanish mathematician
- Ricardo Pérez (Mexican footballer) (born 1995)

== See also ==
- Ricard Pérez Casado (1945–2026), Spanish politician
- Ricardo Peres, Portuguese football manager
