= Bochkarev =

Bochkarev, Botchkarev or Bochkaryov (Russian: Бочкарёв, from bochkar meaning cooper) is a Russian masculine surname, its feminine counterpart is Bochkareva, Botchkareva or Bochkaryova. It may refer to

- Arkady Bochkaryov (1931–1988), Soviet basketball player
- Maria Bochkareva (1889–1920), Russian military commander
- Natalya Bochkareva (born 1980), Russian stage and film actress
- Sergei Viktorovich Bochkarev (born 1941), Russian mathematician
- Vasily Bochkarev (1949–2016), Russian politician
- Viatcheslav Botchkarev (born 1968), Russian sports shooter
- Yelyzaveta Bochkaryova (born 1978), Ukrainian track cyclist
- Yevgeniya Bochkaryova (born 1980), Russian gymnast

== See also ==
- 19915 Bochkarev, an asteroid
- Bochkarev Brewery, a Russian brewer now part of Heineken
