= Onsager Medal =

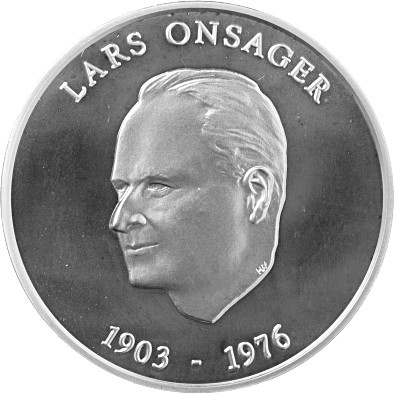

The Onsager Medal (Norwegian: Onsagermedaljen) is a scholastic presentation awarded to researchers in one or more subject areas of chemistry, physics or mathematics. The medal is awarded in memory of Lars Onsager, who received Nobel Prize in Chemistry in 1968. The medal, designed by Harald Wårvik, commemorates the efforts of a single individual as chosen by the Onsager committee at the Norwegian University of Science and Technology (NTNU). The professorship awardee is expected to spend 3–6 months working at NTNU. The lectureship awardee will give a lecture at the university.

== Professorship ==
- 1993 George Stell, State University of New York, Stony Brook (statistical physics)
- 1994 Vladisav Borisovic Lazarev, Kurnakov Institute of General and Inorganic Chemistry, Moscow (chemistry)
- 1995 F. W. Gehring, University of Michigan (mathematics)
- 1996 J. M. J. van Leeuwen, Leiden University (statistical physics)
- 1997 Dick Bedeaux, Leiden University (physical chemistry)
- 1998 V. S. Varadarajan, University of California, Los Angeles (mathematics)
- 1999 Arieh Iserles, University of Cambridge (mathematics)
- 2000 V. Havin, St Petersburg (mathematics)
- 2001 David A. Brant, University of California, Irvine (chemistry)
- 2002 John S. Newman, Department of Chemical Engineering, University of California (chemical engineering)
- 2003 Miguel Rubí Capaceti, Facultat de Fisica, Departament Fisica Fonamental, Universitat de Barcelona, Spain (chemistry)
- 2004 George Batrouni, University of Nice Sophia Antipolis, France (physics)
- 2005 Alexander Volberg, Michigan State University (mathematics)
- 2006 John R. Klauder, Departments of Physics and Mathematics, University of Florida (physics and mathematics)
- 2007 Matthieu H. Ernst, Institute for Theoretical Physics, Utrecht University, The Netherlands (physics)
- 2008 Peter S. Riseborough, Department of Physics, Temple University, Philadelphia, USA (physics)
- 2009 Gerrit Ernst-Wilhelm Bauer, Kavli Institute of NanoScience, Delft University of Technology, The Netherlands (physics)
- 2010 Elisabeth Bouchaud, Head of the Division of Physics and Chemistry of Surfaces and Interfaces at CEA-SACLAY, Gif-sur-Yvette, France (physics)
- 2011 George W. Scherer, W. L. Knapp Professor of Civil & Environmental Engineering, Princeton University
- 2012 Richard J. Spontak, Department of Materials Science & Engineering, and Department of Chemical & Biomolecular Engineering, North Carolina State University
- 2013 Reinout Quispel, La Trobe University, Melbourne, Australia
- 2014 Xiang-Yu Zhou, Chinese Academy of Sciences, Beijing, China
- 2015 Matthias Eschrig, Royal Holloway, University of London, UK
- 2016 Jan Vermant, ETH Zürich, Switzerland
- 2017 Jian-Min Zuo, University of Illinois at Urbana-Champaign, USA.
- 2018 Eero Saksman, University of Helsinki, Finland
- 2019 Daan Frenkel, University of Cambridge
- 2020 Lorenz T. Biegler, Carnegie Mellon University, USA
- 2023 Maria Helena Godinho, Department of Materials Science, NOVA School of Science and Technology, NOVA University Lisbon, Portugal
- 2024 Alexei Gruverman, the Charles Bessey Professor of Physics, University of Nebraska–Lincoln, USA

== Lectureship ==
- 1993 M. E. Fisher, University of Maryland (statistical physics)
- 1994 Benjamin Widom, Cornell University (statistical physics and physical chemistry)
- 1995 Werner Ebeling, Humboldt University of Berlin (physical chemistry)
- 1996 Russell J. Donnelly, University of Oregon (superfluids)
- 1997 Pierre-Gilles de Gennes, Collège de France (physics)
- 1998 Elliott H. Lieb, Princeton University (physics and mathematics)
- 1999 Henk N. W. Lekkerkerker, Utrecht University, Utrecht (colloid chemistry)
- 2000 Vaughan Jones, University of California, Los Angeles (mathematics)
- 2001 Sir Michael Berry, University of Bristol (mathematical physics)
- 2002 Frank H. Stillinger, Department of Chemistry, Princeton University (chemistry)
- 2003 Ivar Giaever, Physics Department, Rensselaer Polytechnic Institute (physics)
- 2004 Leo Kadanoff, Department of Physics and Mathematics, University of Chicago (physics and mathematics)
- 2005 Sir Brian Pippard, Cavendish Laboratory, University of Cambridge (physics)
- 2006 Rodney J. Baxter FRS FAA, Centre for Mathematics and Its Applications, Mathematical Sciences Institute, Australian National University (physics and mathematics)
- 2007 Robert B. Laughlin, Department of Physics, Stanford University (physics)
- 2008 Terence Tao, Department of Mathematics, University of California at Los Angeles (mathematics)
- 2009 Bertrand I. Halperin, Department of Physics, Harvard University (physics)
- 2010 Ingrid Daubechies, Department of Mathematics, Princeton University (mathematics)
- 2011 Peter Hänggi, Institut für Physik, Universität Augsburg, Germany
- 2012 Arnold J. Levine, Institute for Advanced Study, Princeton
- 2013 Stanislav Smirnov, Université de Genève, Switzerland
- 2014 Sir Konstantin Novoselov, University of Manchester, UK
- 2015 Jean-Marie Lehn, Collège de France and Laboratoire de Chimie Supramoléculaire, University of Strasbourg, France
- 2016 Stefan Hell, Max Planck Institute for Biophysical Chemistry, Göttingen, Germany (physics)
- 2017 May-Britt Moser and Edvard Moser, Kavli Institute for Systems Neuroscience, NTNU, Trondheim, Norway (biology)
- 2018 Yves Meyer, École normale supérieure Paris-Saclay (mathematics)
- 2019 Lene Vestergaard Hau, Harvard University (physics)
- 2020 Emmanuelle Charpentier, Max Planck Unit for Science of Pathogens, Germany (biology)
- 2023 Roger Blandford, Stanford University (physics)
- 2024 Martin Hairer, École Polytechnique Fédérale de Lausanne and Imperial College, London (mathematics)
- 2025 Pablo Jarillo-Herrero, MIT, USA (physics)
- 2026 Avi Wigderson, Institute for Advanced Study, Princeton University, USA (mathematics)
