= Pyotr Ulyanov =

Russian mathematician

Pyotr Lavrentyevich Ulyanov (Russian: Пётр Лавре́нтьевич Улья́нов) (May 3, 1928 – November 13, 2006) was a Russian mathematician working on analysis.

After graduating from Saratov State University in 1950, Ulyanov studied at Moscow State University, where he received in 1953 his Russian Candidate of Sciences degree (PhD) under the supervision of Nina Bari. In 1960 at Moscow State University he received his Russian Doctor of Science degree (habilitation) and became a professor. There from 1979 he headed the department of function theory and functional analysis. From 1957 he also worked at the Steklov Institute of Mathematics.

In 1970 Ulyanov was an invited speaker in the section Ensembles exceptionelles en analyse with talk Allgemeine Entwicklungen und gemischte Fragen (General developments and special questions) delivered in German at the International Congress of Mathematicians in Nice. He was from 1981 a corresponding member and from 2006 a full member of the Russian Academy of Sciences. He was on the editorial board of Matematicheskii Sbornik.

He was the founder of the International Saratov Winter School "Contemporary Problems of Function Theory and Their Applications".

His doctoral students include Sergei Viktorovich Bochkarev, Boris Kashin, and Evgenii Nikishin.
