= Hans van Leeuwen (physicist) =

Dutch physicist (1932–2024)

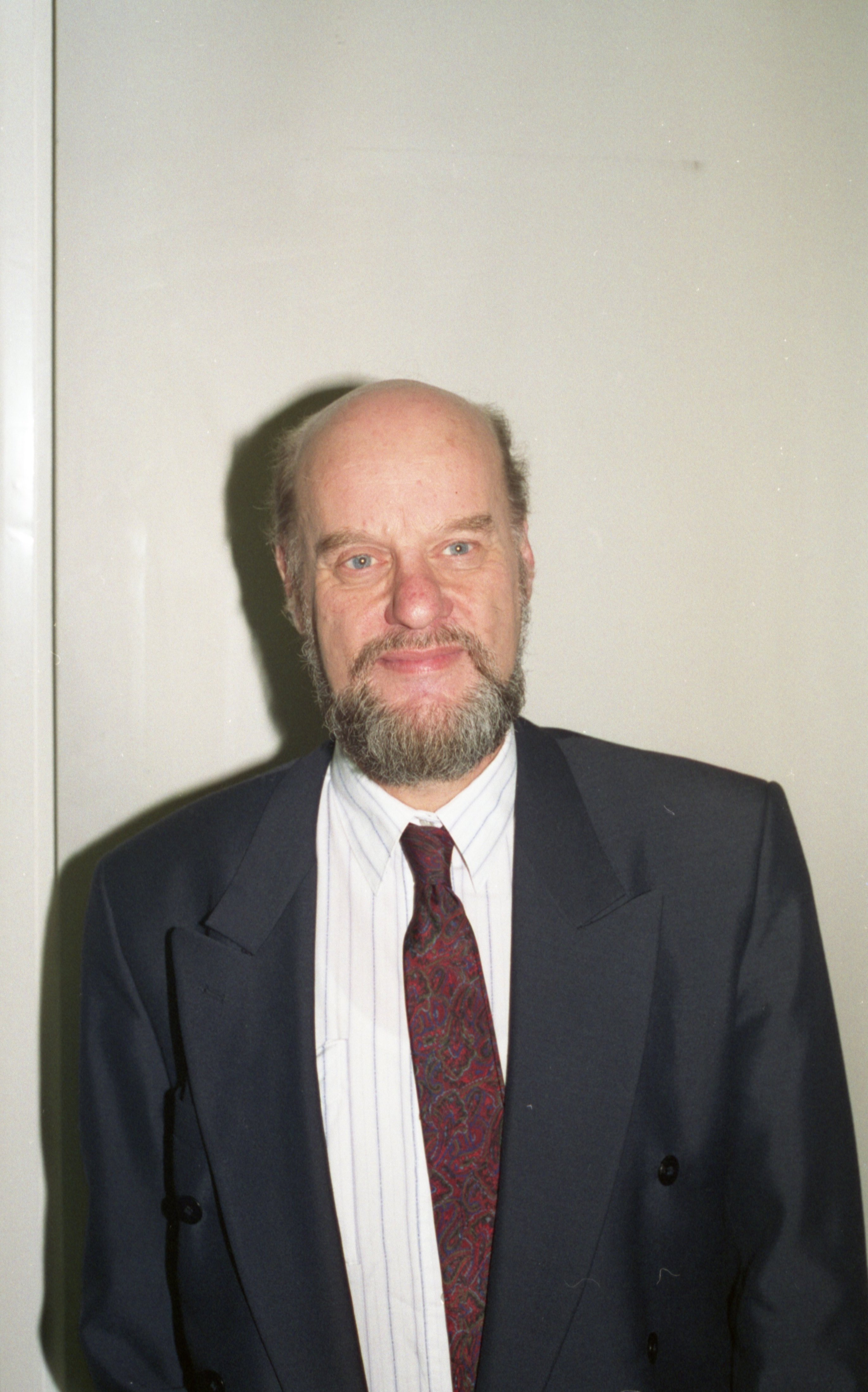
van Leeuwen in 1993

Johannes Maria Jozef "Hans" van Leeuwen (5 August 1932 – 3 December 2024) was a Dutch physicist.

== Life and career ==
Van Leeuwen was born in Heerhugowaard on 5 August 1932. In 1962 he obtained his doctorate at the University of Amsterdam under professor J. de Boer with a thesis titled: "Diagram techniques in statistical mechanics". In 1969 he became professor of physics at Delft University of Technology. He moved to the Lorentz Institute for theoretical physics of Leiden University in 1986.

Van Leeuwen was elected a member of the Royal Netherlands Academy of Arts and Sciences in 1985. He was elected a Fellow of the American Physical Society in 1994 "For contributions to statistical physics, in particular to the understanding of static and dynamic correlations in fluids, and to real space renormalization group theory". In 1996 Van Leeuwen received the Onsager Medal.

Van Leeuwen died on 3 December 2024, at the age of 92.
