= Michael Herman (mathematician) =

French-American mathematician (1942–2000)

- Born: 6 November 1942; New York City
- Died: 2 November 2000 (aged 57); Paris
- Education: Paris-Sud 11 University
- Known for: Herman ring Denjoy–Koksma inequality Surface hopping
- Awards: ICM Speaker (1978, 1998); Salem Prize (1976)
- Scientific career
- Fields: Mathematics
- Doctoral advisor: Harold Rosenberg
- Doctoral students: Marie-Claude Arnaud; Raphael Douady; Raphaël Krikorian; Jean-Christophe Yoccoz; Bassam Fayad

Michael Robert Herman (6 November 1942 – 2 November 2000) was a French American mathematician. He was one of the leading experts on the theory of dynamical systems.

Born in New York City, he was educated in France. He was a student at École polytechnique before being one of the first members of the Centre de Mathématiques created there by Laurent Schwartz. In 1976 he earned his PhD at the Paris-Sud 11 University, under supervision of Harold Rosenberg. He introduced Herman rings in 1979.

Herman received the Salem Prize in 1976. He was an Invited Speaker of the International Congress of Mathematicians (ICM) in 1978 in Helsinki and the ICM in 1998 in Berlin. Among his students was Jean-Christophe Yoccoz, 1994 Fields Medalist.

== See also ==
- Almost Mathieu operator
- Kolmogorov–Arnold–Moser theorem
