= Harold Rosenberg (mathematician) =

American mathematician (born 1941)

Harold William Rosenberg (born February 19, 1941 in New York City) is an American mathematician who works on differential geometry. Rosenberg has worked at Columbia University, at the Institut des Hautes Études Scientifiques, and at the University of Paris. He currently works at the IMPA, Brazil. He earned his Ph.D. at the University of California, Berkeley in 1963 under the supervision of Stephen P. L. Diliberto.

In 2004 he was elected to the Brazilian Academy of Sciences. His students include Norbert A'Campo, Christian Bonatti, and Michael Herman.

In 1993, he studied the hypersurfaces in Euclidean space with a given constant value of an elementary symmetric polynomial of the shape operator, known as a higher-order mean curvature. His primary result was to obtain some control of the height of such a surface over a plane containing its boundary. As an application, he was able to derive some rigidity results for complete surfaces with constant higher-order mean curvature.

In 2004, he and Uwe Abresch extended the classical Hopf differential, discovered by Heinz Hopf in the 1950s, from the setting of surfaces in three-dimensional Euclidean space to the setting of surfaces in products of two-dimensional space forms with the real line. They showed that, if the surface has constant mean curvature, then their Hopf differential is holomorphic relative to the natural complex structure on the surface. As an application, they were able to show that any immersed sphere of constant mean curvature must be rotationally symmetric, thereby extending a classical theorem of Alexandrov.

== Major publications ==
- Rosenberg, Harold (1993). "Hypersurfaces of constant curvature in space forms". Bulletin des Sciences Mathématiques. 117 (2): 211–239. CiteSeerX 10.1.1.27.7127. MR 1216008. Zbl 0787.53046.
- Nelli, Barbara; Rosenberg, Harold (2002). "Minimal surfaces in $H^2 \times \mathbb{R}$". Bulletin of the Brazilian Mathematical Society. New Series. 33 (2): 263–292. doi:10.1007/s005740200013. MR 1940353. S2CID 122871070. Zbl 1038.53011. (Erratum: doi:10.1007/BF03259375)
- Abresch, Uwe; Rosenberg, Harold (2004). "A Hopf differential for constant mean curvature surfaces in $S^2 \times \mathbb{R}$ and $H^2 \times \mathbb{R}$". Acta Mathematica. 193 (2): 141–174. doi:10.1007/BF02392562. MR 2134864. Zbl 1078.53053.
