= J. D. Cannon =

American actor (1922–2005)

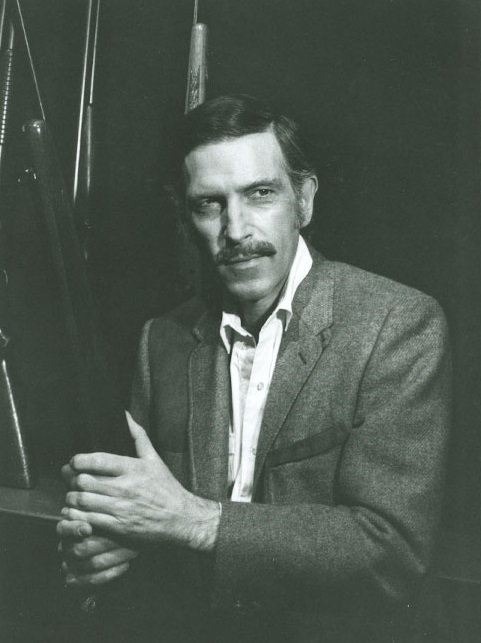
- Born: John Donovan Cannon; April 24, 1922; Salmon, Idaho, U.S.
- Died: May 20, 2005 (aged 83); Hudson, New York, U.S.
- Education: American Academy of Dramatic Arts
- Occupation: Actor
- Years active: 1960–1991
- Spouse: Alice McCamley (1947–2005, his death)

John Donovan Cannon (April 24, 1922 – May 20, 2005) was an American actor. An alumnus of the American Academy of Dramatic Arts in New York City, he is best known for his co-starring role of Chief of Detectives Peter B. Clifford in the television series McCloud with Dennis Weaver from 1970 until 1977, and for his part as the witness Lloyd Chandler who cleared Dr. Richard Kimble (David Janssen) in "The Judgment", the series finale of The Fugitive.

== Life and career ==
=== Films and television ===
Cannon served in the United States Army during World War II. Cannon first appeared on television as Master Sergeant Sherman in the sitcom The Phil Silvers Show, also known as You'll Never Get Rich.

He appeared in a 1963 episode of Combat!, titled "The Quiet Warrior", as a member of the American Intelligence.

In 1964, he appeared in the TV Western Gunsmoke, as the evil killer “Pike Beecham” in the episode “Big Man, Big Target” (S10E10).

In 1965, he appeared in an episode of The Alfred Hitchcock Hour. The episode, titled “Completely Foolproof”, originally aired March 29, 1965.

In 1970, Cannon appeared as Roy Harkness on The Men from Shiloh, the retitled name for the final season of TV western The Virginian in the episode titled "Hannah". He played a recurring character – a lawman named Harry Briscoe working for the Bannerman Detective Agency - in the 1971 to 1973 series Alias Smith and Jones. He guest-starred in many series over the years, including Wagon Train, The Defenders, Gunsmoke, Rawhide, Lancer, The Fugitive, Voyage to the Bottom of the Sea, The Untouchables, The Wild Wild West, East Side West Side (TV series), The Invaders, Combat!, Stoney Burke, and the miniseries Testimony of Two Men (1977) and Top of the Hill (1980). He was cast in several episodes of Murder, She Wrote. His last television acting appearance was on an episode of Law & Order in 1991.

He is best remembered for his seven year long turn beginning in 1970 as Chief Peter D. Clifford, the sarcastic, long-suffering boss of Deputy Sam McCloud in the NBC series McCloud. Although Clifford respected McCloud's ability to solve unusual cases, McCloud's techniques often drove him to despair and enraged him.

He wore a toupee in most of his later roles. The exception was the Remington Steele episode "Steele in the News" (March 4, 1983), in which Cannon played a TV news anchor who only wore his toupee while broadcasting. He also appeared (with his toupee), that same season (#2), of Remington Steele in episode 21 "Hounded Steele". In the second season of 12 O'Clock High (1965–1966), he played Brig. Gen. Dave Creighton in the 34th episode of the series "RX for a Sick Bird".

Cannon appeared in film roles, often as a cold-eyed villain. His film credits included An American Dream (1966), Cool Hand Luke (1967), Krakatoa, East of Java (1969), The Thousand Plane Raid (1969), Heaven with a Gun (1969), Cotton Comes to Harlem (1970), Lawman (1971), Scorpio (1973), Raise the Titanic (1980), Death Wish II (1982) and Beyond Witch Mountain (1982).

=== Stage ===
Cannon was a founding member of Joseph Papp's New York Shakespeare Festival, starring in their productions of The Taming of the Shrew (1956) and Much Ado About Nothing (1961).

He starred with James Earl Jones in the original off-Broadway production of Athol Fugard's Blood Knot (1964).

=== Other appearances ===
In 1979, Cannon was the presenter in an instructional video demonstrating an MCA DiscoVision video disc player.

== Personal life and death ==
Cannon married Alice McCamley, an actress and writer who appeared in Broadway productions including Company and Johnny Johnson. In 1962, he and Colleen Dewhurst starred in his wife's play Great Day in the Morning, based on her childhood in St. Louis.

Cannon died at his home in Hudson, New York, on May 20, 2005, at the age of 83. Alice suffered a debilitating stroke in 2014 and died in 2017.

== Filmography ==
Film
Year	Title	Role	Notes
1966	An American Dream	Sergeant Walt Leznicki	
1967	Cool Hand Luke	Society Red	
1969	Krakatoa, East of Java	Danzig	
1969	The Thousand Plane Raid	General Cotten Palmer	
1969	Heaven with a Gun	Mace	
1970	Cotton Comes to Harlem	Calhoun	
1971	Lawman	Hurd Price	
1973	Scorpio	Filchock	
1979	The Concorde ... Airport '79	Lieutenant John Ratcliff	TV version only
1980	Raise the Titanic	Captain Joe Burke	
1982	Death Wish II	New York District Attorney	
1982	Beyond Witch Mountain	Deranian	
1987	Street Justice	Dante	
Television
1961	The Defenders	District Attorney	episode: "The Attack"
1962	The Defenders	District Attorney Manetto	episode: "The Locked Room"
1962	The Defenders	District Attorney Al Ashley	episode: "The Last Six Months"
1962	The Defenders	District Attorney	episode: "The Voices of Death"
1963	Wagon Train	Abel Weatherly	episode: “The Abel Weatherly Story”
1963	Combat!	Ted Slocum	episode: "The Quiet Warrior"
1963	The Defenders	District Attorney	episode: "Man Against Himself"
1964	The Defenders	District Attorney	episode: "Drink Like a Lady"
1964	The Defenders	District Attorney	episode: "Hero of the People"
1965	The Defenders	Assistant District Attorney Ashley	episode: "The Unwritten Law"
1965	The Alfred Hitchcock Hour	Joe Brisson	episode: "Completely Foolproof"
1965	The Wild Wild West	Flory	episode: "The Night of the Deadly Bed"
1967	The Fugitive (1963 TV series)	Lloyd Chandler	episode: "The Judgement"
1967	The Invaders	Ben Holman	Beachhead
1967	The F.B.I.	Robert Dewey	episode: "Flight Plan"
1968	Lancer	Morgan Price	episode: "Blood Rock"
1968	The Invaders	Peter Kalter	The Organization
1969	Bonanza	Colonel Hudson	episode: "The Fence"
1969	Gunsmoke	Jake MacGraw	episode: "MacGraw"
1970–1977	McCloud	Chief Peter B. Clifford	45 episodes
1971–1973	Alias Smith and Jones	Harry Briscoe / Bannerman / Chief Detective	
1979	Ike: The War Years	Gen. Walter Bedell Smith	TV Miniseries
1983–1984	Remington Steele	Elliot Walsh/Kevin Masters	2 episodes
1986	Blacke's Magic	General Ellis Wersching	episode: "Address Unknown"
1989	The Return of Sam McCloud	Commissioner Peter B. Clifford	Television film
1991	Law & Order	Chet Burton	The Secret Sharers
