= Puzzle of a Downfall Child =

1970 film by Jerry Schatzberg

- Original film poster
- Directed by: Jerry Schatzberg
- Screenplay by: Carole Eastman; (credited as Adrien Joyce)
- Story by: Jerry Schatzberg; Carole Eastman; (credited as Adrien Joyce)
- Produced by: John Foreman
- Starring: Faye Dunaway; Barry Morse; Viveca Lindfors; Roy Scheider; Barry Primus; Ruth Jackson; John Heffernan; Sydney Walker
- Cinematography: Adam Holender
- Edited by: Evan Lottman
- Music by: Michael Small
- Distributed by: Universal Pictures
- Release date: 1970
- Running time: 104 minutes
- Country: United States
- Language: English

Puzzle of a Downfall Child is a 1970 American drama film directed by Jerry Schatzberg and starring Faye Dunaway, Barry Morse, Viveca Lindfors, Roy Scheider, and Barry Primus.

== Plot ==
A beautiful but disturbed young woman lives alone at a beach cottage, reliving her past, a life of delusions and lies. Lou Andreas Sand is a former fashion model whose life has gone into a downward spiral, including drug use and a nervous breakdown. She tells an acquaintance, Aaron Reinhardt, her story for a film he is planning on her, but the details do not ring true. Lou evidently had a lover who abused her, and a penchant for sex with strange men. Along the way, she became engaged to marry Mark, an ad executive, but apparently jilted him on the day of their wedding, leading to her descent into drugs and an attempted suicide.

== Cast ==
- Faye Dunaway as Lou Andreas Sand
- Barry Primus as Aaron Reinhardt
- Viveca Lindfors as Pauline Galba
- Barry Morse as Dr. Galba
- Roy Scheider as Mark
- Ruth Jackson as Barbara Casey
- John Heffernan as Dr. Sherman
- Sydney Walker as Psychiatrist
- Clark Burckhalter as Davy Bright
- Shirley Rich as Peggy McCavage
- Emerick Bronson as Falco
- Joe George as 1st Man in Bar
- John Eames as 1st Doctor
- Harry Lee as Mr. Wong
- Jane Halleran as Joan
- Susan Willis as Neighbor
- Barbara Carrera as T.J. Brady
- Sam Schacht as George

== Production ==
The film was Schatzberg's first foray into feature-film making; at the time, he was primarily known as a fashion photographer and had directed a few commercials.

Schatzberg initially worked with French screenwriter Jacques Sigurd, who had written a script involving a woman having an abortion, but the collaboration came to an end due to creative differences. Carole Eastman, whose unused draft for Petulia Schatzberg had enjoyed, was approached to write a new screenplay, and only the title from Sigurd's script was kept on the insistence of Schatzberg. Eastman based the new script on recordings Schatzberg had made of his friend, model Anne St. Marie, while Aaron was in part based on Schatzberg himself. The phrase "downfall child" came from a friend of Schatzberg's who had recounted a nightmare where she was trying to save a child falling from a building.

The name of Faye Dunaway's character is an allusion to Lou Andreas-Salomé.

== Theatre ==
The movie was adapted as a two-character play by Elisabeth Bouchaud (in French) and put on at La Reine Blanche (Paris) in 2017.

== See also ==
- List of American films of 1970
