= Nikolai Georgievich Makarov =

Russian-American mathematician (born 1955)

- Born: January 1955 (age 71)
- Education: Leningrad State University; Steklov Institute of Mathematics
- Awards: Salem Prize (1986); Rolf Schock Prize (2020)
- Scientific career
- Fields: Mathematics
- Workplaces: California Institute of Technology
- Doctoral advisor: Nikolai Nikolski
- Doctoral students: Stanislav Smirnov; Dapeng Zhan

Nikolai Georgievich Makarov (Russian: Николай Георгиевич Макаров; born January 1955) is a Russian-American mathematician. He is known for his work in complex analysis and its applications to dynamical systems, probability theory and mathematical physics. He is currently the Richard Merkin Distinguished Professor of Mathematics at Caltech, where he has been teaching since 1991.

== Career ==
Makarov belongs to the Leningrad school of geometric function theory. He graduated from the Leningrad State University with a bachelor's degree in 1982. He received his Ph.D. (Candidate of Science) from the Steklov Institute of Mathematics in 1986 under Nikolai Nikolski with thesis Metric properties of harmonic measure (title translated from Russian). He was an academic at the Steklov Institute of Mathematics in Leningrad. Since 1991 he has been a professor at Caltech.

In 1986 he was an Invited Speaker of the ICM in Berkeley, California. In 1986 he was awarded the Salem Prize for solving difficult problems involving the boundary behavior of the conformal mapping of a disk onto a domain with a Jordan curve boundary using stochastic methods. In 2020, he was awarded the Rolf Schock Prize, "for his significant contributions to complex analysis and its applications to mathematical physics".

His doctoral students include the Fields medallist Stanislav Smirnov, Alexei Poltoratski and Dapeng Zhan.

== Research ==
Makarov works in complex analysis and related fields (potential theory, harmonic analysis, spectral theory) as well as on various applications to complex dynamics, random matrices and mathematical conformal field theory.

Makarov's most well-known result concerns the theory of harmonic measure in the complex plane. Makarov's theorem states that: Let Ω be a simply connected domain in the complex plane. Suppose that ∂Ω (the boundary of Ω) is a Jordan curve. Then the harmonic measure on ∂Ω has Hausdorff dimension 1.

Makarov has also studied diffusion-limited aggregation which describes crystal growth in two dimensions with Lennart Carleson and Beurling-Malliavin theory with his former student Alexei Poltoratski. He has studied the thermodynamic formalism for iterations of the rational functions with another of his former students Stanislav Smirnov, Fields medallist. He has studied the universality laws and field convergence in normal random matrix ensembles.

His most recent research concerns the mathematical conformal field theory and its relation to Schramm–Loewner evolution theory.

== Selected publications ==
- "Probability methods in the theory of conformal mappings" (PDF). Algebra i Analiz. 1 (1): 3–59. 1989. English version: "Probability methods in the theory of conformal mappings". Leningrad Mathematical Journal. 1 (1): 1–56. 1990.
- "Fine structure of harmonic measure" (PDF). St. Petersburg Mathematical Journal. 10: 217–268. 1999.
- with S. Smirnov: Makarov, N.; Smirnov, S. (2000), "On thermodynamics of rational maps I. Negative spectrum", Communications in Mathematical Physics, 211 (3): 705–743, Bibcode:2000CMaPh.211..705M, doi:10.1007/s002200050833
- with L. Carleson: Carleson, L.; Makarov, N. (2001). "Aggregation in the plane and Loewner's equation". Communications in Mathematical Physics. 216 (3): 583–607. Bibcode:2001CMaPh.216..583C. doi:10.1007/s002200000340. S2CID 1892626.
- with L. Carleson: Carleson, L.; Makarov, N. (2002). "Laplacian path models". Journal d'Analyse Mathématique. 87: 103–150. doi:10.1007/BF02868471. S2CID 15046044.
- with I. Binder and S. Smirnov: Binder, I.; Makarov, N.; Smirnov, S. (2003). "Harmonic measure and polynomial Julia sets". Duke Mathematical Journal. 117 (2): 343–365. doi:10.1215/S0012-7094-03-11725-1.
- with Y. Ameur and H. Hedenmalm: Ameur, Yacin; Hedenmalm, Håkan; Makarov, Nikolai (2011). "Fluctuations of eigenvalues of random normal matrices". Duke Mathematical Journal. 159: 31–81. arXiv:0807.0375. doi:10.1215/00127094-1384782. S2CID 38202968.
- with N.-G. Kang: "Gaussian free field and conformal field theory". Astérisque. 353. 2013. ISBN 978-2-85629-369-0. ISSN 0303-1179.
- with S.-Y. Lee: Lee, Seung-Yeop; Makarov, Nikolai (2016). "Topology of quadrature domains". Journal of the American Mathematical Society. 29 (2): 333–369. arXiv:1307.0487. doi:10.1090/jams828.
