= Evgenii Nikishin =

Russian mathematician

Evgenii Mikhailovich Nikishin (Russian: Евгений Михайлович Никишин; 23 June 1945 – 17 December 1986) was a Russian mathematician, who specialized in harmonic analysis.

== Biography ==
Nikishin, at age of 24, earned his candidate doctorate at Moscow State University, becoming the youngest Candidate Doctorate in a history of MSU and in 1971 his habilitation (Russian doctorate) at the Steklov Institute under Pyotr Ulyanov (1928–2006). In 1977 he became a professor at Moscow State University, where he remained until his death after a long battle with cancer.

He worked on approximation theory, especially Padé approximants. Nikishin systems of functions are named after him. Also named in his honour is the Nikishin-Stein factorisation theorem, which is a 1970 generalization by Nikishin of the Stein factorisation theorem. Nikishin also did research on rational approximations in number theory and wrote a monograph on such approximations in a unified approach that also treated rational approximations in function spaces.

In 1972 he won the Lenin Komsomol Prize and in 1973 he won the Salem Prize, that awarded every year to a young mathematician judged to have done outstanding work world wide. In 1978 he was an Invited Speaker (The Padé Approximants) at the International Congress of Mathematicians in Helsinki.

Evgeniy was a long friend and colleague of Anatoly Fomenko with whom they were developing a revising historical chronology.

== Selected publications ==
- Nikishin, E. M. (1970). "Resonance theorems and super linear operators". Russian Mathematical Surveys. 25 (6): 125–187. Bibcode:1970RuMaS..25..125N. doi:10.1070/rm1970v025n06abeh001270.
- with Vladimir Nikolaevich Sorokin: Rational approximations and orthogonality. AMS. 1991.
