= Susan Willis =

American actress

- Born: August 27, 1925; Seneca County, Ohio, U.S.
- Died: May 14, 2009 (age 83); Manhattan, New York City, U.S.

Susan Crobaugh (August 27, 1925 - May 14, 2009), better known as Susan Willis, was an American actress.

Willis was born in Tiffin, Ohio, and she was a 1947 graduate of the Carnegie Tech Drama School. She acted in community theater while she was a student.

Willis's Broadway credits included Oliver! (1984), Come Live With Me (1967), Cabaret (1966), and Dylan (1964).

She was married to Kirk Willis, a stage director. She died in New York City.

== Filmography ==
Year	Title	Role	Notes
1970	Puzzle of a Downfall Child	Neighbor	
1989	She-Devil	Ute	
1991	What About Bob?	Mrs. Guttman	
1998	The Faculty	Mrs. Jessica Brummel	
1999	The 13th Warrior	Wendol Mother	(credit only)
2001	The Majestic	Irene Terwilliger	
2002	Far from Heaven	Receptionist	
2003	Mystic River	Mrs. Prior	
2003	Uptown Girls	Old Lady	
2005	Confess	Old Woman	
2006	Live Free or Die	Mrs. Blodgett	
2007	The Favor	Old Lady	
2007	Unholy	Gertrude	
2008	Bittersweet	Lillian	
2009	Doctor S Battles the Sex Crazed Reefer Zombies: The Movie	Zombie	(final film role)
