= Marie-Claude Arnaud =

French mathematician

Marie-Claude Arnaud-Delabrière (born 24 February 1963) is a French mathematician, specializing in dynamical systems. She is University Professor of Mathematics at the University of Avignon and a senior member of the Institut Universitaire de France.

== Education and career ==
Arnaud was a mathematics student at the École normale supérieure (Paris) from 1983 to 1987; she earned a bachelor's degree in 1984, an agrégation in 1985, and a diplôme d'études approfondies in 1986. She earned her doctorate in 1990 from Paris Diderot University under the supervision of Michael Herman, and completed a habilitation in 1999 at Paris-Sud University.

After working as an assistant at Louis Pasteur University from 1987 to 1989, and then as a temporary researcher at Paris Diderot University from 1989 to 1991, she became an assistant professor at Paris Diderot University in 1991. In 2001 she moved to Avignon as a full professor.

== Recognition ==
In 2010, Arnaud was a speaker at the International Congress of Mathematicians. In 2011 she won the Gabrielle Sand and M. Guido Triossi Prize of the French Academy of Sciences for her work on Hamiltonian dynamical systems, and in particular on the regularity of invariant curves in the dynamics of billiards. She was named to the Institut Universitaire de France as a senior member in 2013. She became a member of the Academia Europaea in 2020.
