= Salem Prize =

Mathematicians award

- Description: outstanding contributions to the field of mathematical analysis
- Country: International
- Presented by: School of Mathematics at the Institute for Advanced Study in Princeton
- Reward: 5000 French Francs
- Status: Active

The Salem Prize, in memory of Raphael Salem, is awarded each year to young researchers for outstanding contributions to the field of analysis. It is awarded by the School of Mathematics at the Institute for Advanced Study in Princeton and was founded by the widow of Raphael Salem in his memory. The prize is considered highly prestigious and many Fields Medalists previously received it. The prize was 5000 French Francs in 1990.

== Past winners ==
(Note: a ^{F} symbol denotes mathematicians who later earned a Fields Medal).

- 1968 Nicholas Varopoulos
- 1969 Richard Hunt
- 1970 Yves Meyer
- 1971 Charles Fefferman^{F}
- 1972 Thomas Körner
- 1973 Evgenii Mikhailovich Nikishin
- 1974 Hugh Montgomery
- 1975 William Beckner
- 1976 Michael R. Herman
- 1977 S. V. Bockarev
- 1978 Björn E. Dahlberg
- 1979 Gilles Pisier
- 1980 Stylianos Pichorides
- 1981 Peter Jones
- 1982 Alexei B. Aleksandrov
- 1983 Jean Bourgain^{F}
- 1984 Carlos Kenig
- 1985 Thomas Wolff
- 1986 Nikolai Makarov
- 1987 Guy David and Jean Lin Journe
- 1988 Alexander Volberg and Jean-Christophe Yoccoz^{F}
- 1989 no prize
- 1990 Sergei Konyagin
- 1991 Curtis T. McMullen^{F}
- 1992 Mitsuhiro Shishikura
- 1993 Sergei Treil
- 1994 Kari Astala
- 1995 Håkan Eliasson
- 1996 Michael Lacey and Christoph Thiele
- 1997 no prize
- 1998 Trevor Wooley
- 1999 Fedor Nazarov
- 2000 Terence Tao^{F}
- 2001 Oded Schramm and Stanislav Smirnov^{F}
- 2002 Xavier Tolsa
- 2003 Elon Lindenstrauss^{F} and Kannan Soundararajan
- 2004 no prize
- 2005 Ben J. Green
- 2006 Stefanie Petermichl and Artur Avila^{F}
- 2007 Akshay Venkatesh^{F}
- 2008 Bo'az Klartag and Assaf Naor
- 2009 no prize
- 2010 Nalini Anantharaman
- 2011 Zhan Dapeng and Julien Dubedat
- 2012 no prize
- 2013 Larry Guth
- 2014 Dmitry Chelkak
- 2015 no prize
- 2016 Maryna Viazovska^{F}
- 2017 no prize
- 2018 Alexander Logunov
- 2023 Sarah Peluse and Julian Sahasrabudhe
- 2024 Miguel Walsh and Yilin Wang
- 2025 Vesselin Dimitrov and Hong Wang^{F}

== See also ==
- List of mathematics awards
