= Stefanie Petermichl =

German mathematician (born 1971)

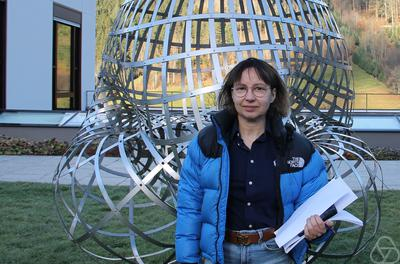
Petermichl at Oberwolfach in 2025

Stefanie Petermichl (born 1971) is a German mathematical analyst who works as a professor at the University of Toulouse, in France. Topics of her research include harmonic analysis, several complex variables, stochastic control, and elliptic partial differential equations.

== Education and career ==
Petermichl studied at the Karlsruhe Institute of Technology, and then did her graduate studies at Michigan State University, completing her Ph.D. in 2000 under the supervision of Alexander Volberg. After postdoctoral studies at the Institute for Advanced Study and Brown University, she joined the faculty of the University of Texas at Austin in 2005. She moved to the University of Bordeaux in 2007, and again to Toulouse in 2009. Since 2019, she holds the Humboldt chair at the University of Würzburg.

== Recognition ==
Petermichl won the Salem Prize for 2006 "for her work on several crucial impacts to the theory of vector valued singular operators". She was the first woman to win that prize. In 2012, the French Academy of Sciences gave her their Ernest Déchelle Prize. She became a member of the Institut Universitaire de France in 2013. She is an invited speaker at the 2018 International Congress of Mathematicians, speaking in the section on Analysis and Operator Algebras. In 2016, she was awarded a European Research Council (ERC) grant.
