= Elisabeth Bouchaud =

French physicist, playwright, and actress

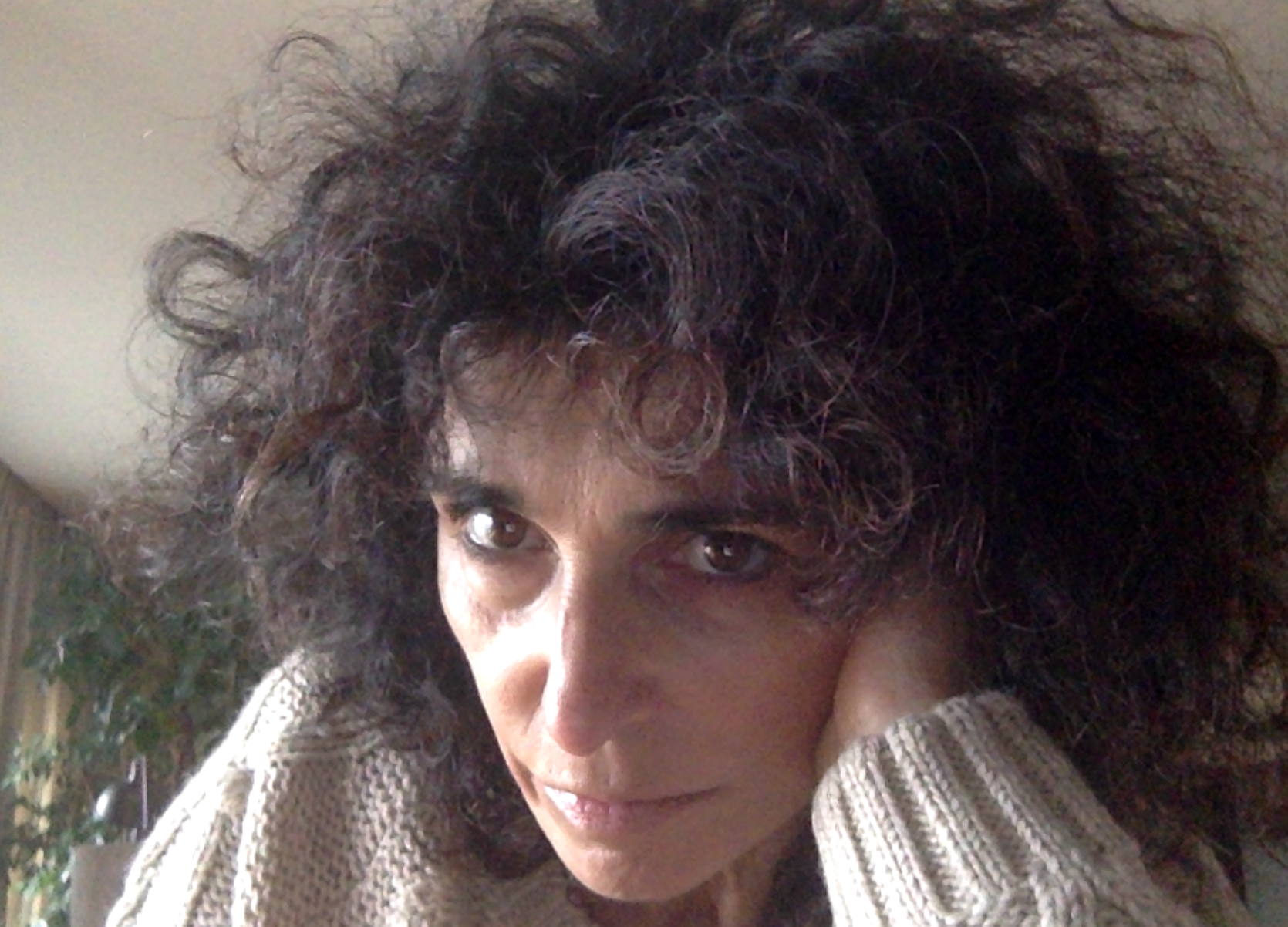
- Elisabeth Bouchaud in 2020
- Born: 1 March 1961 (age 65); Tunis
- Citizenship: French
- Education: École Centrale Paris, Paris-Saclay University, Conservatoire de Bourg-la-Reine/Sceaux
- Known for: Her work on the morphology of fracture surfaces
- Awards: Lars Onsager Medal, Louis Ancel Prize, Aniuta Winter-Klein Prize, Jean Perrin Prize of Honour, 100 Femmes de culture
- Scientific career
- Fields: Physics, Theatre
- Doctoral advisor: Mohamed Daoud

Elisabeth Bouchaud (born Tibi) is a French physicist, playwright and actress born 1 March 1961. She is a former member of Commissariat à l'énergie atomique (CEA), and of Ecole Superieure de Chimie et Physique de la Ville de Paris. Since 2014, she is also the Director of the Théâtre de la Reine Blanche in Paris. In 2019, she opened a theatre in Avignon. That same year, she also created a drama school, with fr:Florient Azoulay and fr:Xavier Gallais

In physics, she has worked in quantitative fractography, establishing some universal fractal properties of fracture surfaces, a subject pioneered by Benoit Mandelbrot. In fact, the term "fractal" itself was coined by Mandelbrot in 1975, based on the Latin frāctus meaning "broken" or "fractured".

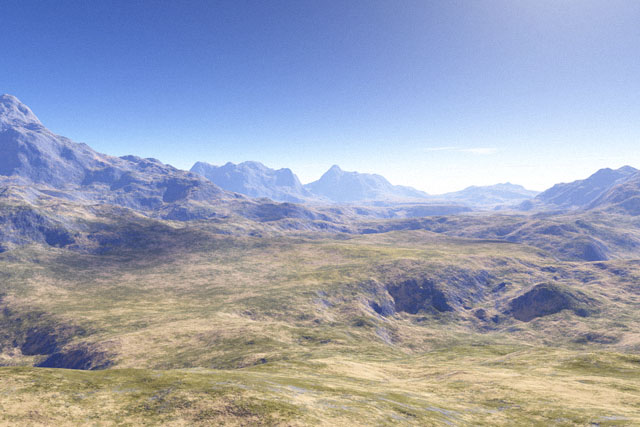
A close-up on a crack surface looks very much like this fractal landscape.

Elisabeth Bouchaud suggested that these fractal properties could be understood in terms of the propagation of the crack front in a disordered environment, which is affected by the vicinity of a depinning transition.

She was awarded the Louis Ancel Prize, the Onsager Medal, and the Aniuta Winter-Klein Prize.

In 2025, for her work at La Reine Blanche, she was awarded the Jean Perrin Prize of Honour. She was also named one of the 100 Women of Culture of the Year 2025.

== Literary works ==
Elisabeth Bouchaud wrote several short stories and plays. Her first two plays - « Dangerous liaisons », after Choderlos de Laclos, and « The tragedy of Medea -- bad blood » were written in 1991 and 1992 respectively. « The tragedy of Medea - bad blood » was performed at The Playroom in Cambridge, under the direction of Richard Bridge. While in Cambridge, where she was working at the Metallurgy Department, she wrote her third play, « À contre-voix » (« Counterpoint »), which was translated into English by Mary Luckhurst. The play was first created in London in 1994 at the « Grace Theatre at the Latchmere Pub », now called Theatre 503. It was also performed at the Avignon Festival that same year, under the direction of Isabelle Andreani. Later, in 2000, « À contre-voix » was brought again to the Avignon Festival, with stage director Serge Dangleterre.

In 1996 she wrote « Musical Box », which was performed in 2001 at the theatre festival of Coye La Forêt under the direction of Claude Domenech.

In 2012, she re-wrote a « Tragedy of Medea », entitled « Apatride » (« Stateless ») for herself, a singer and puppets. The play was performed at the Avignon Festival, and then at Ecole Normale Supérieure in 2013, under the direction of Cécile Grandin.

She then wrote Puzzle, a stage adaptation of Puzzle of a Downfall Child by Jerry Schatzberg, put on at the Theatre La Reine Blanche in 2017 under the stage direction of Serge Dangleterre.

She wrote « Le paradoxe des jumeaux » with Jean-Louis Bauer. It was put on at La Reine Blanche in 2017, for the 150th birthday of Marie Curie. The stage direction was due to Bernadette Le Saché. It was published at L’avant-scène théâtre together with the translation by Elisabeth Bouchaud of Dava Sobel’s play « And the Sun stood still ».

In 2021, she created « De la matière dont les rêves sont faits » (« Of such stuff that dreams are made on ») at the Avignon Festival, where she shared the stage direction with actor Grigori Manoukov.

In 2022, she wrote the first episodes of a theatre series Les Fabuleuses about the life of women scientists that made breakthroughs in physics, but were not remembered through history as male colleagues took the credit and the prizes: (Lise Meitner, Jocelyn Bell, Rosalind Franklin, Marthe Gautier). « Exil intérieur » (« Internal exile ») and « Prix No’Bell » (« No’Bell Prize ») were created at La Reine Blanche in 2022, under the direction of Marie Steen. « L’affaire Rosalind Franklin » (« The Rosalind Franklin case ») was created in 2024 at La Reine Blanche under the direction of fr:Julie Timmerman, who will also create « La découvreuse oubliée » about the life and achievements of Marthe Gautier (« The forgotten discoverer ») in 2026. All the plays are published at « L’avant-scène théâtre ».
