= Nikolai Kapitonovich Nikolski =

Russian mathematician (born 1940)

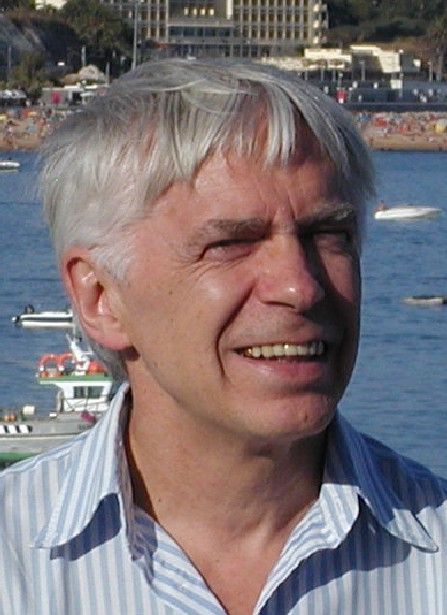
Nikolai Nikolski, 2006, near Sintra, Portugal, during the WOAT conference (from the personal archive of Galina Spitkovskaya).

Nikolai Kapitonovich Nikolski (Николай Капитонович Никольский, sometimes transliterated as Nikolskii, born 16 November 1940) is a Russian mathematician, specializing in real and complex analysis and functional analysis.

In 1966, Nikolski earned his Candidate of Sciences degree (PhD) from the Leningrad State University under Viktor Khavin with thesis Invariant subspaces of certain compact operators (title translated from Russian). In 1973 he received his Doctor of Sciences degree (habilitation) published as monograph (VI) below. He was a Laboratory director (of Math Analysis) at the Steklov Institute of Mathematics in Leningrad and Professor of Department of Mathematics at Leningrad State University. In 1991 he became a professor at the University of Bordeaux.

Nikolski's research deals with operator theory, harmonic analysis, and complex analysis. He has published more than 100 papers and six research monographs.

He was an Invited Speaker with talk What problems do spectral theory and functional analysis solve for each other? at the ICM in 1978 in Helsinki. In 2010, he was awarded the Ampère Prize of the French Academy of Sciences, and in 2012 he was elected a Fellow of the American Mathematical Society, as well as for several temporary positions as Fellow of the Advanced Study Institute at Indiana University (Bloomington, 1988), Distinguished Visiting Scholar, Ben-Gurion University (Israel, 1993), MSRI Research grant (Berkeley, 1995), Marie Curie Action Senior Fellow, TODEQ Project, 2008, Taussky-Todd Distinguished Professor, Caltech (Pasadena, 2015).

His doctoral students (total 26) include Alexander Borichev, Nikolai Makarov, Sergei Treil, Vasily Vasyunin, Alexander Volberg.

Among his notable contributions, Nikolski was one of the Leningrad mathematicians who in 1984 verified the correctness of the proof of the Bieberbach conjecture by Louis de Branges.

== Selected publications ==
=== Articles ===
- Nikolski, Nikolai (1999). "In search of the invisible spectrum". Ann. Inst. Fourier (Grenoble). 49 (6): 1925–1998. doi:10.5802/aif.1743.
- Nikolski, Nikolai (1999). "Remarks concerning completeness of translates in function spaces". J. Approx. Theory. 98 (2): 303–315. doi:10.1006/jath.1999.3365.
- Nikolski, Nikolai; Gorkin, P.; Mortini, R. (2008). "Norm controlled inversions and a corona theorem for H∞-quotient algebras". Journal of Functional Analysis. 255 (4): 854–876. doi:10.1016/j.jfa.2008.05.011.
- Nikolski, Nikolai (2012). "In a shadow of the RH: Cyclic vectors of Hardy spaces on the Hilbert multidisc". Annales de l'Institut Fourier. 62 (5): 1601–1626. doi:10.5802/aif.2731.
- Nikolski, Nikolai; Verbitsky, I. (2017). "Fourier multipliers for weighted L² spaces with Lévy–Khinchin–Schoenberg weights". J. Reine Angew. Math. 731: 159–201. arXiv:1404.4380. doi:10.1515/crelle-2014-0123.
- Nikolski, Nikolai (2022). "Three dimensions of metric-measure spaces, Sobolev embeddings and optimal sign transport". Algebra i Analiz. 34 (2): 118–151.

=== Research Monographs ===
(I) Toeplitz matrices and operators, Cambridge Studies in Advanced Mathematics, 182, Cambridge University Press, Cambridge, 2020 (French original: Matrices et opérateurs de Toeplitz, C&M, Paris, 2017).

(II) Hardy Spaces, Cambridge University Press, Cambridge Studies in Advanced Mathematics, 179, Cambridge, 2019 (French original: Éléments d’analyse avancée. Espaces de Hardy, Belin, Paris, 2012).

(III) Operators, Functions, and Systems. An easy reading, Vol. 1 and Vol. 2, Mathematical Surveys and Monographs, American Mathematical Society, Providence, 2002;.

(IV) Treatise on the Shift Operator, Grundlehren der mathematischen Wissenschaften 273, Springer Verlag 1986

(V) Lectures on the Shift Operator (Russian: «Лекции об операторе сдвига»), Nauka, Moscow, 1980.

(VI) Selected problems of weighted approximation and spectral analysis, American Mathematical Society, Providence, 1976, Zbl 0342.41028 (Russian original: «Избранные задачи весовой аппроксимации и спектрального анализа», Trudy Mat. Inst. Steklova, vol. 120, Moscow, 1974, Zbl 0342.41027).

=== Books Editor, an excerpt ===
- ”Zapiski Nauchnyh Seminarov LOMI (Leningrad Branch of the Steclov Mathematical Institute)”:

- volumes 19 (1970), 22 (1971), 30 (1972), 39 (1974), 47 (1974), 56 (1976), 65 (1976), 73 (1977), 81 (1978; with V.P.Havin), etc - more than 25 issues, up to vol. 255 (1998).

- ”Trudy Math. Inst. Steklova”, Moscow, (Russian); English transl.: ”Proc. Steklov Math. Inst.”, AMS, Providence: - vol.130 ”Spectral Theory of Functions and Operators”, 1978, 223 pp; English transl.: Proc. Steklov Math. Inst., 130 (1979), AMS, Providence.

- vol.155 ”Spectral Theory of Functions and Operators. II”, 1981, 187 pp; English transl.: Proc. Steklov Math. Inst., 155(1982), AMS, Providence.

- ”Encyclopaedia of Mathematical Sciences”, Springer-Verlag; co-editor, volumes 15,19,25,42,72,85; 1990 - 1996.
- ”Operator Theory: Advances and Applications”, a Birkhäuser series:

- ”Toeplitz operators and spectral function theory. Essays from the Leningrad Seminar on Operator Theory”, vol.42 (1989), 425 pp., Zbl 0677.00024. - (with V.P.Havin) ”Complex Analysis, Operators, and Related Topics. The S.A.Vinogradov memo- rial volume”, vol.113 (2000), 408 pp., Zbl 0934.00031. - (with A.Borichev) ”Systems, Approximation, Singular Integral Operators, and Related Topics”, IWOTA 2000 Proceedings; vol.129 (2001), 527 pp., Zbl 0972.00051. - (with A.Baranov and S.Kisliakov) ”50 Years with Hardy Spaces. A tribute to Victor Havin”, vol.261 (2018), 484 pp., Zbl 06848809.

- ”Lecture Notes in Mathematics”, Springer-Verlag: - (with V.P.Havin) ”Complex Analysis and Spectral Theory. Seminar, Leningrad 1979/1980”, vol.864 (1981), 480 pp.

- (with V.P.Havin) ”Linear and Complex Analysis Problem Book 3. 341 research problems”, vol. I: 1573 (1994), 488 pp., Zbl 0893.30036; Vol.II: 1574 (1994), 507 pp., Zbl 0893.30037.

- (with E.Charpentier) ”Lécons de Mathématiques d’Aujourd’hui”, Vols. 1(2000), 2(2003), and 3(2007), Cassini, Paris.
- (with E.Charpentier and A.Lesne) ”L’héritage de Kolmogorov en mathématiques”, (French) Zbl 1137.00330, Collection Echelles. Paris: Belin (ISBN 2-7011-3669-5). 303 pp. (2004). Engl. transl.: ”Kolmogorov’s heritage in mathematics”, Zbl 1136.00010, Berlin: Springer (ISBN 978-3-540-36349-1/hbk). viii, 317 pp. (2007). (See Ref. 3 below).
