= The Public Theater =

Arts organization in New York City

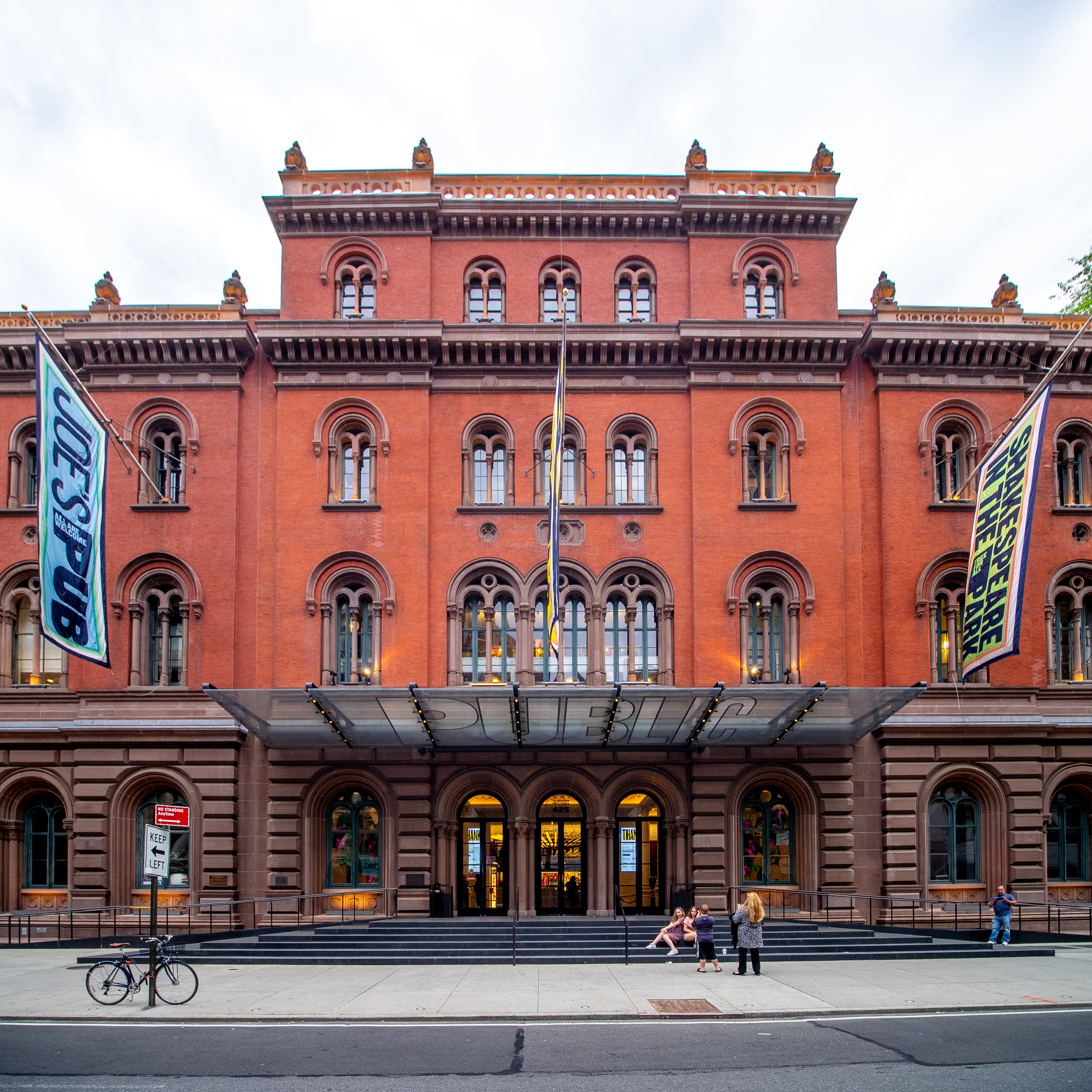
- The Astor Library Building, where the Public Theater is headquartered
- Interactive map of The Public Theater
- Address: 425 Lafayette Street; Manhattan, New York; United States
- Coordinates: 40°43′45″N 73°59′30″W
- Capacity: LuEsther: 160; Martinson: 199; Shiva: 99; Newman: 299; Anspacher: 275
- Type: Off-Broadway
- Designation: New York City Landmark (Astor Library Building)
- Public transit: Eighth Street–New York University station, Astor Place station

Construction
- Opened: 1967

Website
- www.publictheater.org

The Public Theater is an arts organization based in Manhattan, New York City. Founded by Joseph Papp, the Public Theater was originally the Shakespeare Workshop in 1954; its mission was to support emerging playwrights and performers. Its first production was the musical Hair in 1967. Since Papp, the theater has been led by JoAnne Akalaitis (1991–93), and George C. Wolfe (1993–2004), and is currently under Artistic Director Oskar Eustis and Executive Director Patrick Willingham.

The Public's headquarters is located at 425 Lafayette Street in the former Astor Library Building in Lower Manhattan. The building contains five theater spaces, and Joe's Pub, a cabaret-style venue for new work, musical performances, spoken-word artists, and soloists. Additionally, the Public operates the Delacorte Theater in Central Park, where it has staged free "Shakespeare in the Park" performances since 1954.

Recent productions include: The Merchant of Venice (2010); Here Lies Love (2013); Fun Home (2013); Eclipsed (2015); and Hamilton (2015).

== Programs and series ==
In addition to each season of full-scale theatrical productions, the Public produces several different series, festivals, and programs each year.

The Public presented its inaugural Public LAB series in 2008 with an annual series of new plays presented in collaboration with LAByrinth Theater Company. With each Public LAB show, the corresponding speaker series is presented as after-show talkbacks to discuss prominent themes, ideas, and topics in the plays. Several plays that have appeared in the Public LAB series have gone onto full-scale productions, including Tracey Scott Wilson's The Good Negro, which ran at the Public in 2009, and Bloody Bloody Andrew Jackson, which had a sold-out, thrice-extended off-Broadway run at the Public in spring 2010 and transferred to Broadway that fall.

In 2011, Public LAB expanded to include Public LAB SHAKESPEARE, which is a new platform for the Public's exploration of the Shakespeare canon. This expansion marks the growth of the Public's Shakespeare Initiative and provides more ways for the Public to produce American interpretations of Shakespeare's works. The first production of Public LAB SHAKESPEARE was Timon of Athens in March 2011, with Richard Thomas playing the title role.

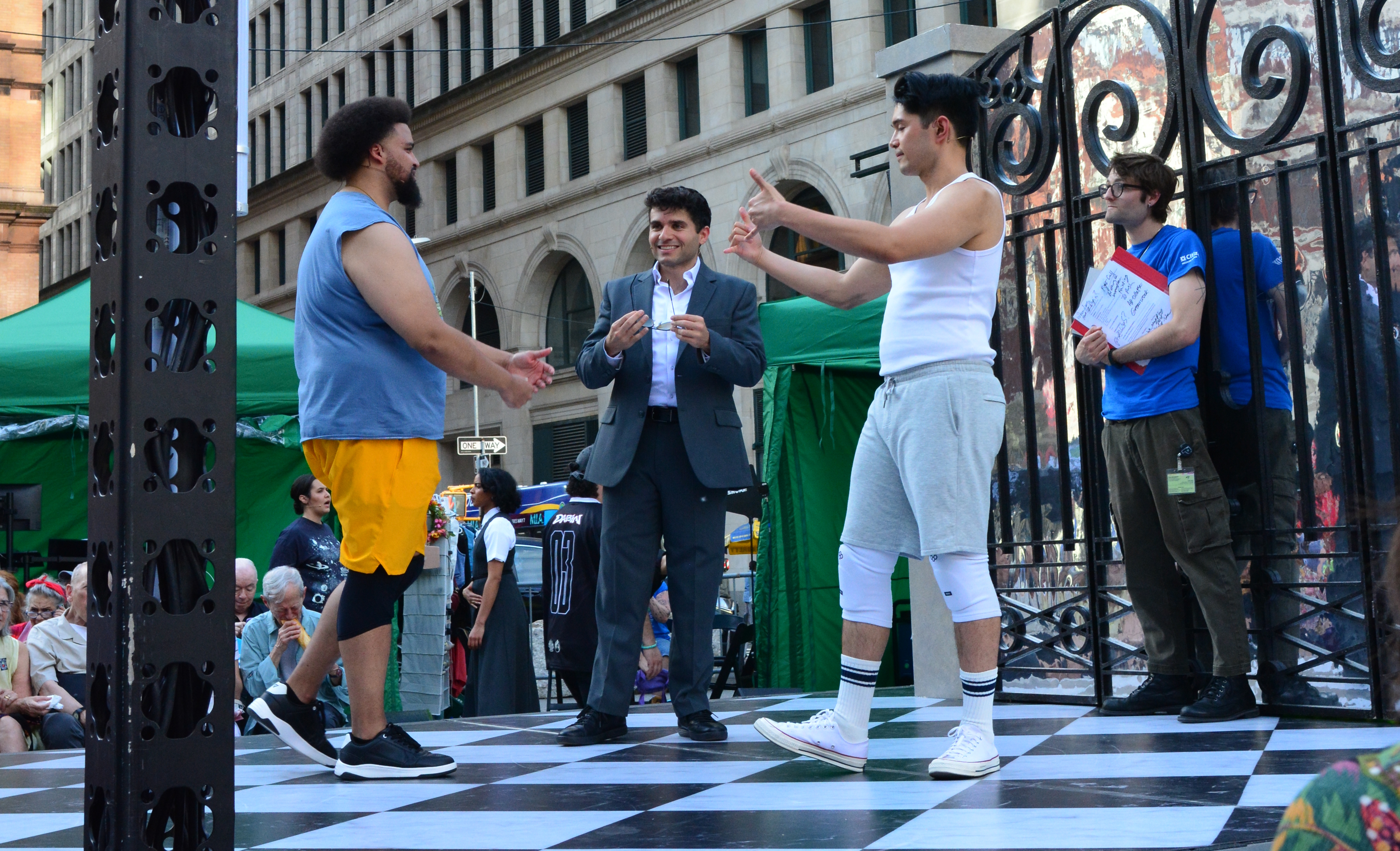
Members of the Mobile Unit get in some last-minute rehearsal before an outdoor performance of Shakespeare's As You Like It at Astor Place (2026).

Since 2013, the Public's Mobile Unit has been bringing free Shakespeare performances to various locations throughout New York City's five boroughs, including prisons, homeless shelters, and community centers. The tour concludes at the Public Theater, having previously performed at notable venues such as Rikers Island, Borden Avenue's Veteran's Shelter, and The Fortune Society. The Public also launched its inaugural Public Works production in 2013. Public Works combines diverse groups of people throughout the five boroughs of New York City to watch theater, participate in theatrical workshops, and perform in one full-scale Public Works production alongside professional actors at Shakespeare in the Park. Past Public Works productions include The Tempest, The Winter's Tale, and The Odyssey.

The Public Forum, begun in 2010, is a series of lectures, debates, and conversations that showcase leading voices in the arts, politics and the media. Curated by Jeremy McCarter, a senior writer at Newsweek, Public Forum events explore issues raised by plays in the Public's season, as well as the political and cultural headlines of today's world. Notable participants in the series include Stephen Sondheim, Tony Kushner, Arianna Huffington, Alec Baldwin and Anne Hathaway.

In 2006, the Public began producing an annual experimental theater festival, the Under the Radar Festival (UTR), which had debuted in January 2005. Under the Public, UTR presented over 194 companies from 40 countries. UTR has presented works by such artists as Elevator Repair Service, Gob Squad, Belarus Free Theatre, and Young Jean Lee. Citing financial reasons, the Public stopped producing UTR in 2023, though the festival has continued and the Public remains a partner venue for the festival.

The Public serves as the home of the Emerging Writers Group, which seeks to target playwrights at the earliest stages in their careers. The Emerging Writers Group is a component of the Public Writers Initiative.

The Public also fosters Public Studio, a performance series dedicated to developing the works of new and emerging theater artists. Emerging playwrights get the opportunity to stage a piece somewhere between a workshop and a full production in front of an audience, as an opportunity to gage audience reaction and further develop their work.

The Public Theater invests in theater education, training classical actors through the annual summer acting intensive known as the Shakespeare Lab. The Shakespeare Lab is the Public Theater's professional actor development program that immerses a selected company of professional, mid-career actors in a summer intensive exploring the rigors, challenges, and joys of performing Shakespeare.

The Public Theater hosts educational programs for teenagers such as Shakespeare Spring Break, Summer ShakeUP, and A Midsummer Day's Camp programs, all for teenagers interested in learning about and performing Shakespeare.

Suzan-Lori Parks, Pulitzer Prize-winning playwright and Master Writer Chair of the Public, debuted her performance piece Watch Me Work as part of the 2011 Under The Radar Festival. In the performance, Parks worked on her newest writing project in the main lobby of the Public Theater.

== Notable works and awards ==
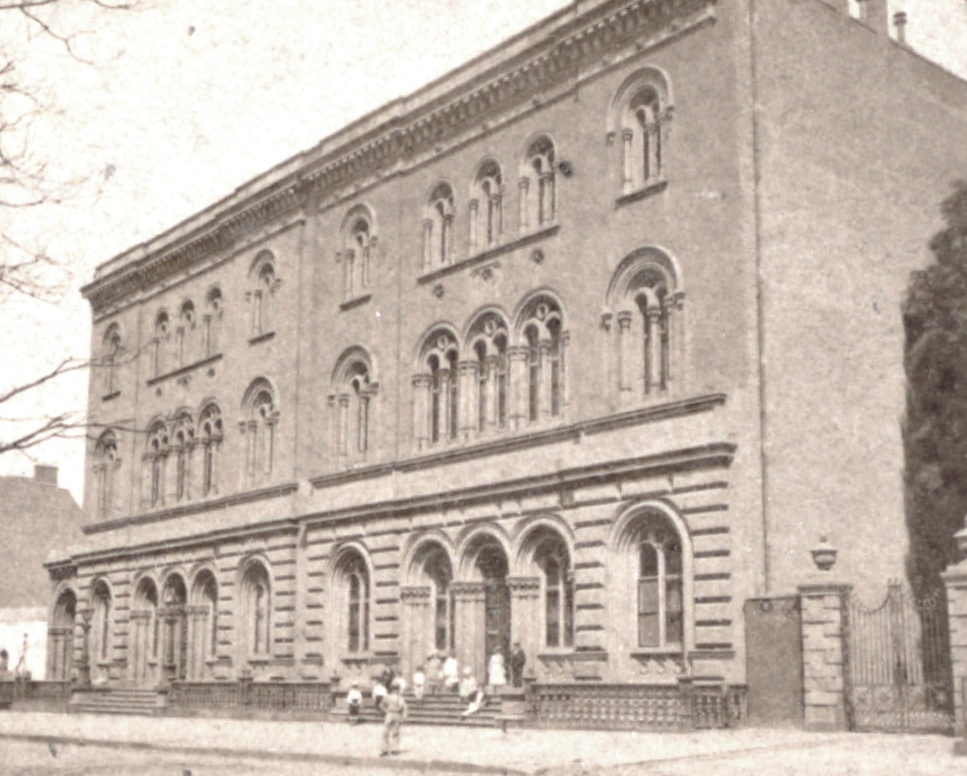
The Astor Library Building in the latter half of the 19th century

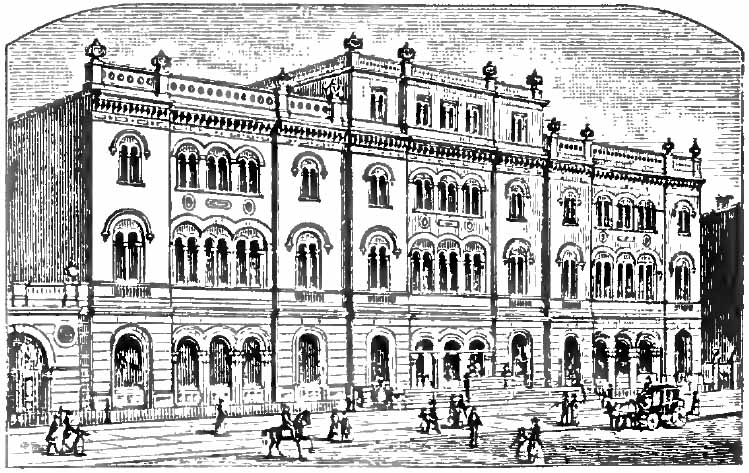
A drawing of the Library published in 1900

A number of the Public's productions have moved to larger Broadway theaters upon the conclusion of their run at Astor Place. The three most commercially successful of these works have been Hair (1967), A Chorus Line (1975), and Hamilton (2015).

The Public Theater has won 54 Tony Awards, 152 Obie Awards, 42 Drama Desk Awards and five Pulitzer Prizes. Fifty-five Public Theater productions have moved to Broadway, including Sticks and Bones, That Championship Season, A Chorus Line, For Colored Girls Who Have Considered Suicide When the Rainbow Is Enuf, The Pirates of Penzance, The Tempest, Bring in 'da Noise, Bring in 'da Funk, Michael John LaChiusa's The Wild Party, The Ride Down Mt. Morgan, Topdog/Underdog, Take Me Out, Caroline, or Change, Passing Strange, the revival of HAIR, Bloody Bloody Andrew Jackson, The Merchant of Venice, The Normal Heart, Well, Fun Home, Hamilton, and Eclipsed.

== Astor Library Building ==
The Public has been housed in a landmarked Romanesque revival structure at 425 Lafayette Street since 1967, built between 1853 and 1881 for the Astor Library. German-born architect Alexander Saeltzer, who had been the architect of the Anshe Chesed Synagogue, designed the structure. Astor funded two expansions of the building toward Astor Place, designed by Griffith Thomas (1856–1869) and Thomas Stent (1879–1881).

In 1920, the Hebrew Immigrant Aid Society purchased the building. By 1965, it was in disuse and faced demolition. The Public Theater, then the New York Shakespeare Festival, persuaded the city to purchase it for use as a theater. It was converted for theater use by Giorgio Cavaglieri. The building is a New York City Landmark, designated in 1965. It was extensively renovated between 2010 and 2012.

== Public Works productions ==
In 2013, the Public launched Public Works, which brings together diverse groups of people throughout the five boroughs of New York City to watch theater, participate in theatrical workshops, and perform in one full-scale Public Works production alongside professional actors at Shakespeare in the Park. Past Public Works productions include The Tempest, The Winter's Tale, and The Odyssey. Two productions, Shaina Taub's adaptations of Twelfth Night and As You Like It, were later remounted as full Shakespeare in the Park productions in 2018 and 2022, respectively.

Year	Work performed	Director	Notable cast members	Ref.
2013	The Tempest	Lear deBessonet		
2014	The Winter’s Tale	Lear deBessonet	Lindsay Mendez	
2015	The Odyssey	Lear deBessonet		
2016	Twelfth Night	Kwame Kwei-Armah	Nikki M. James, Andrew Kober, Jose Llana, Jacob Ming-Trent	
2017	Hamlet	Sam Gold	Gayle Rankin	
2019	Hercules (Note: stage adaptation of the 1997 Disney film)	Lear deBessonet	Jelani Alladin, Roger Bart, Jeff Hiller, James Monroe Iglehart, Ramona Keller, Tamika Lawrence, Krysta Rodriguez, Rema Webb	
