= Sergei Viktorovich Bochkarev =

Soviet and Russian mathematician

Sergei (or Sergey) Viktorovich Bochkarev (or Bočkarev) (Сергей Викторович Бочкарёв, July 24, 1941, in Kuybyshev now renamed Samara – July 8, 2021) is a Soviet and Russian mathematician.

== Education and career ==
He received in 1964 his undergraduate degree from Moscow Institute of Physics and Technology and in 1969 his Russian Candidate of Sciences degree (PhD) from Moscow State University. His dissertation о рядах Фурье по системе Хаара (On Fourier series in the Haar system) was supervised by Pyotr Lavrentyevich Ulyanov. From Moscow State University, Bochkarev received in 1974 his Russian Doctor of Science degree (habilitation). Since 1971 he has worked at the Steklov Institute of Mathematics, where he holds the title of leading scientific researcher in the Department of Function Theory.

His research deals with harmonic analysis, BMO spaces, Hardy spaces, functional analysis, construction of orthogonal bases in various function spaces, and exponential sums.

In 1977 he was awarded the Salem Prize. In 1978 he was an Invited Speaker with talk Метод усреднения в теории ортогональных рядов (The averaging method in the theory of orthogonal bases) at the International Congress of Mathematicians in Helsinki.

== Selected publications ==
- On a problem of Zygmund, Mathematics of the USSR-Izvestia, vol. 7, no. 3, 1973, p. 629
- Existence of a basis in the space of functions analytic in the disk, and some properties of Franklin's system, Math. USSR Sbornik, vol. 24, 1974, pp. 1–16
- The method of averaging in the theory of orthogonal series and some questions in the theory of bases, Tr. MIAN SSSR, vol. 146, 1978, pp. 3–87
- The method of averaging in the theory of orthogonal series and some questions in the theory of bases, Proc. Steklov Inst. Math., vol. 146, 1980, pp. 1–92
- Everywhere divergent Fourier series with respect to the Walsh system and with respect to multiplicative systems, Russian Math. Surveys, vol. 59, 2004, pp. 103–124
- Multiplicative Inequalities for the L_{1} Norm: Applications in Analysis and Number Theory, Proc. Steklov Inst. Math., vol. 255, 2006, pp. 49–64
- A Generalization of Kolmogorov's Theorem to Biorthogonal Systems, Proc. Steklov Inst. Math., vol. 260, 2008, pp. 37–49
