= Virginia Downing =

American actress

Virginia Downing (March 7, 1904 – November 21, 1996) was an American actress on Broadway and Off-Broadway.

== Personal life and death ==
Downing was born on March 7, 1904, in Washington, D.C. She graduated from Bryn Mawr College and worked as a translator of plays for Garson Kanin. She was in the 1990 play Richard III which also starred Denzel Washington. Her husband was the actor John Leighton. Downing died on November 21, 1996, while on her way to a theater due to a heart attack.

== Broadway plays ==
- Father Malachy's Miracle
- Forward the Heart
- Cradle Will Rock
- A Gift of Time
- We Have Always Lived in the Castle
- Arsenic and Old Lace

== Off-Broadway plays ==
- Juno and the Paycock
- The Man with the Golden Arm
- Palm Tree in a Rose Garden
- Play with a Tiger
- The Weives
- The Idiot
- Medea
- Mrs. Warren's Profession
- Mercy Street
- Thunder Rock
- Pygmalion
- First Week in Bogota
- Rimers of Eldritch
- Les Blancs
- Shadow of a Gunman
- All The Way Home
- Winter's Tale
- Billy Liar
- Shadow and Substance
- Silent Catastrophe
- Ernest in Love
- Night Games
- Frog In His Throat
- All That Fall
- Richard III'
