= Ricardo Pérez-Marco =

Spanish-French mathematician

Ricardo Pérez-Marco (born 1967) is a Spanish mathematician at the Université Paris XIII. He won the 1996 EMS Prize for his work on dynamical systems.

Born in Barcelona, Pérez-Marco studied at the École Normale Supérieure. He then earned his doctorate from Université de Paris-Sud in 1990, under supervision of Jean-Christophe Yoccoz.
