= John Heffernan (American actor) =

American film, stage and television actor

- Born: May 30, 1934; Manhattan, New York, U.S.
- Died: December 3, 2018 (aged 84)
- Occupations: Film, stage and television actor
- Years active: 1950s–2001

John Heffernan (May 30, 1934 – December 3, 2018) was an American film, stage and television actor. He was best known for playing Eddie Niles in the 1973 film The Sting.

== Life and career ==
Heffernan was born in Manhattan, New York. He began his screen career in the 1950s in New York, appearing in Broadway productions, and winning an Obie Award in 1961. In 1964, he replaced Albert Finney in the title role of the New York production of Luther. His last stage credit was for the 1982 production Alice in Wonderland.

Heffernan began his screen career in 1960, appearing in the anthology television series The Play of the Week. He also played Professor Everett Chambers in the soap opera television series The Doctors, and Chester Markham in Mary Hartman, Mary Hartman. In 1973, he played Eddie Niles in the film The Sting. He appeared in films such as Bringing Out the Dead, 92 in the Shade, 1492: Conquest of Paradise, Gloria, Extreme Measures, and The Fisher King.

Heffernan retired from acting in 2001, last appearing in the NBC police procedural television series Law & Order.

== Death ==
Heffernan died on December 3, 2018, at the age of 84.

== Filmography ==
Year	Title	Role	Notes
1961	Time of the Heathen	Gaunt	
1970	Puzzle of a Downfall Child	Dr. Sherman	
1973	The Sting	Eddie Niles	
1975	92 in the Shade	Myron	
1976	God Told Me To	Bramwell	
1991	The Fisher King	Stockbroker Bum	
1992	1492: Conquest of Paradise	Brother Buyl	
1996	Extreme Measures	Cartman	
1999	Gloria	Hotel Clerk	
1999	Bringing Out the Dead	Mr. Oh	
