= Sergei Konyagin =

Russian mathematician (born 1957)

- Born: 25 April 1957 (age 69)
- Awards: Salem Prize
- Scientific career
- Fields: Mathematics
- Workplaces: Moscow State University
- Doctoral advisor: Sergey Stechkin

Sergei Vladimirovich Konyagin (Russian: Серге́й Владимирович Конягин; born 25 April 1957) is a Russian mathematician. He is a professor of mathematics at the Moscow State University. His primary research interest is in applying harmonic analysis to number theoretic settings.

Konyagin participated in the International Mathematical Olympiad for the Soviet Union, winning two consecutive gold medals with perfect scores in 1972 and 1973. At the age of 15, he became one of the youngest people to achieve a perfect score at the IMO.

In 1990 Konyagin was awarded the Salem Prize.

In 2012 he became a fellow of the American Mathematical Society.

== Selected works ==
- Konyagin, S.; Shaparlinski, I. (1999). Character sums with exponential functions and their applications. Cambridge: Cambridge University Press. ISBN 0-521-64263-9.
- Konyagin, S. V.; Schlag, W. (1999). "Lower bounds for the absolute value of random polynomials on a neighborhood of the unit circle". Transactions of the American Mathematical Society. 351 (12): 4963–4980. doi:10.1090/S0002-9947-99-02241-2. ISSN 0002-9947.
- Green, Ben; Konyagin, Sergei (2009). "On the Littlewood Problem Modulo a Prime". Can. J. Math. 61 (1): 141. arXiv:math/0601565. doi:10.4153/cjm-2009-007-4. S2CID 14997570.
- Filaseta, Michael; Ford, Kevin; Konyagin, Sergei; Pomerance, Carl; Yu, Gang (2006). "Sieving by large integers and covering systems of congruences". Journal of the American Mathematical Society. 20 (2): 495–517. arXiv:math/0507374. doi:10.1090/S0894-0347-06-00549-2. S2CID 8529007.
- Bourgain, Jean; Konyagin, Sergei V.; Shparlinski, Igor E. (2015). "Character sums and deterministic polynomial root finding in finite fields". Mathematics of Computation. 84 (296): 2969–2977. arXiv:1308.4803. doi:10.1090/mcom/2946. S2CID 14451901.
- Konyagin, Sergei V.; Shparlinski, Igor E. (2015). "Quadratic non-residues in short intervals". Proceedings of the American Mathematical Society. 143 (10): 4261–4269. arXiv:1311.7016. doi:10.1090/S0002-9939-2015-12584-1. S2CID 119171768.
- Ford, Kevin; Green, Ben; Konyagin, Sergei; Maynard, James; Tao, Terence (23 February 2017). "Long gaps between primes". Journal of the American Mathematical Society. 31 (1): 65–105. arXiv:1412.5029. doi:10.1090/jams/876. ISSN 0894-0347.
