= Jean-Christophe Yoccoz =

French mathematician

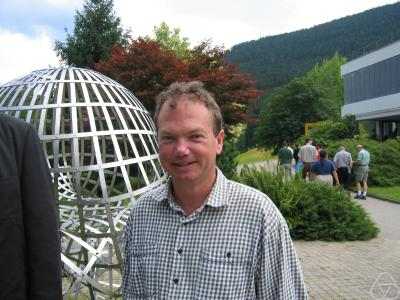
- Jean-Christophe Yoccoz in 2005
- Born: 29 May 1957; Paris, France
- Died: 3 September 2016 (aged 59); Paris, France
- Education: Lycée Louis-le-Grand
- Alma mater: École normale supérieure École Polytechnique
- Known for: Dynamical systems Yoccoz puzzle
- Awards: Salem Prize (1988); Fields Medal (1994)
- Scientific career
- Fields: Mathematics
- Workplaces: Centre de mathématiques Laurent-Schwartz; Paris-Sud 11 University; Collège de France
- Doctoral advisor: Michael Herman
- Doctoral students: Sylvain Crovisier; Ricardo Pérez-Marco
- Website: www.college-de-france.fr/site/jean-christophe-yoccoz/Hommage-a-Jean-Christophe-Yoccoz.htm

Jean-Christophe Yoccoz (29 May 1957 – 3 September 2016) was a French mathematician. He was awarded a Fields Medal in 1994, for his work on dynamical systems.

== Biography ==
Yoccoz attended the Lycée Louis-le-Grand, during which time he was a silver medalist at the 1973 International Mathematical Olympiad and a gold medalist in 1974. He entered the École Normale Supérieure in 1975, and completed an agrégation in mathematics in 1977.

Yaccoz next completed a civil alternative to French military service, which he served at Instituto Nacional de Matemática Pura e Aplicada, Brazil. He then completed his PhD under Michael Herman in 1985 at Centre de mathématiques Laurent-Schwartz, which is a research unit jointly operated by the French National Center for Scientific Research (CNRS) and École Polytechnique.

He took up a position at the University of Paris-Sud in 1987, and became a professor at the Collège de France in 1997, where he remained until his death. He was a member of Bourbaki.

Yoccoz won the Salem Prize in 1988. He was an invited speaker at the International Congress of Mathematicians in 1990 at Kyoto, and was awarded the Fields Medal at the International Congress of Mathematicians in 1994 in Zürich. He joined the French Academy of Sciences and Brazilian Academy of Sciences in 1994, became a chevalier in the French Legion of Honor in 1995, and was awarded the Grand Cross of the Brazilian National Order of Scientific Merit in 1998.

== Mathematical work ==
Yoccoz's worked on the theory of dynamical systems. His contributions include advances to KAM theory, and the introduction of the method of Yoccoz puzzles, a combinatorial technique which proved useful to the study of Julia sets.

== Notable publications ==
- Yoccoz, J.-C. Conjugaison différentiable des difféomorphismes du cercle dont le nombre de rotation vérifie une condition diophantienne. Ann. Sci. École Norm. Sup. (4) 17 (1984), no. 3, 333–359. doi:10.24033/asens.1475
- Yoccoz, Jean-Christophe. Théorème de Siegel, nombres de Bruno et polynômes quadratiques. Petits diviseurs en dimension 1. Astérisque No. 231 (1995), 3–88. MR 1367353
