= Alexander Volberg =

Russian mathematician (born 1956)

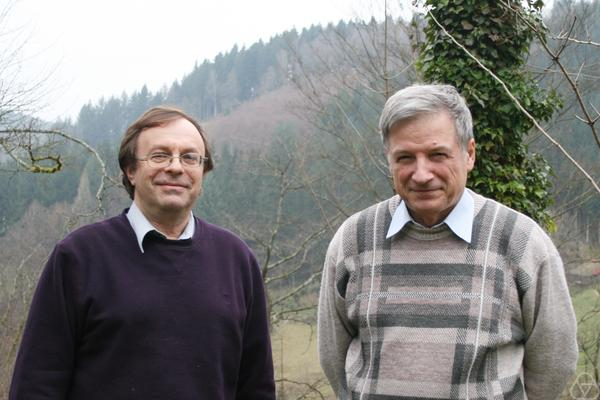
- Alexander Volberg (left)
- Born: 6 March 1956; Leningrad, USSR
- Education: Leningrad State University
- Known for: Operator Theory, Complex Analysis, Harmonic Analysis
- Awards: Salem Prize (1988); Lars Onsager medal (2004); Alexander von Humboldt prize (2011)
- Scientific career
- Fields: Mathematician
- Workplaces: Michigan State University
- Doctoral advisor: Nikolai K. Nikolskii
- Doctoral students: Stefanie Petermichl

Alexander Volberg (Russian: Александр Львович Вольберг) is a Russian mathematician. He is working in operator theory, complex analysis and harmonic analysis. He received the Salem Prize in 1988 for his work in harmonic analysis. He also received the Lars Onsager medal in 2004. He is currently a University Distinguished Professor at Michigan State University. From 2007 to 2008 he was the Sir Edmund Whittaker Professor of Mathematical Science at the University of Edinburgh.

== Awards and recognition ==
In 1988, he received the Salem Prize.

In 2004, he received the Onsager Medal.

In 2011, he won the von Humboldt prize.

He was named to the 2021 class of fellows of the American Mathematical Society "for contributions to harmonic analysis and its relations to geometric measure theory".

In 2024, the article "On the uniform rectifiability of AD-regular measures with bounded Riesz transform operator: the case of codimension 1", by Fedor Nazarov, Xavier Tolsa, and Alexander Volberg has been selected by the International Congress of Basic Science, as a recipient of the 2024 Frontiers of Science Award in Mathematics.
