= Stanislav Smirnov =

Russian mathematician (born 1970)

- Станислав Смирнов
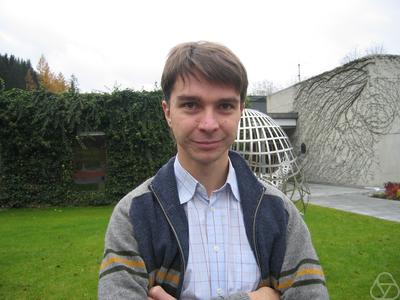
- Smirnov in 2007
- Born: 3 September 1970 (age 56); Leningrad, Soviet Union
- Education: Saint Petersburg State University; California Institute of Technology
- Awards: Clay Research Award (2001); Salem Prize (2001); Rollo Davidson Prize (2002); EMS Prize (2004); Fields Medal (2010)
- Scientific career
- Fields: Mathematics
- Workplaces: University of Geneva; Royal Institute of Technology; Saint Petersburg State University; Yale University; Max Planck Institute for Mathematics; IAS Princeton; Skolkovo Institute of Science and Technology
- Thesis: Spectral Analysis of Julia Sets (1996)
- Doctoral advisor: Nikolai Makarov

Stanislav Konstantinovich Smirnov (Russian: Станисла́в Константи́нович Cмирно́в; born 3 September 1970) is a Russian mathematician currently working as a professor at the University of Geneva. He was awarded the Fields Medal in 2010. His research involves complex analysis, dynamical systems and probability theory.

== Career ==
Stanislav Smirnov graduated Saint Petersburg Lyceum 239, a highly selective high school, which is alma-mater for many well-known mathematicians. During his high-school years, he won two perfect scores in International Mathematical Olympiad 1986 and 1987. He received his undergraduate and master degree in mathematics from the Saint Petersburg State University, one of the top universities in Russia, in 1992. In 1996, he defended his Ph.D. thesis, Spectral Analysis of Julia Sets, at Caltech, with Nikolai Makarov as his primary thesis advisor.

After spending time at Yale University and Princeton's Institute for Advanced Study as a postdoc, Smirnov joined the faculty of the Royal Institute of Technology in Stockholm in 1998. In 2003, he become a professor in the Analysis, Mathematical Physics and Probability group at the University of Geneva.

In 2010, Smirnov became the founding director of the Chebyshev Laboratory in Saint Petersburg State University in Russia.

== Research ==
Smirnov has worked on percolation theory, where he proved Cardy's formula for critical site percolation on the triangular lattice, and deduced conformal invariance. The conjecture was proved in the special case of site percolation on the triangular lattice. Smirnov's theorem has led to a fairly complete theory for percolation on the triangular lattice, and to its relationship to the Schramm–Loewner evolution introduced by Oded Schramm. He also established conformality for the two-dimensional critical Ising model.

== Awards ==
Smirnov was awarded the Saint Petersburg Mathematical Society Prize (1997), the Clay Research Award (2001), the Salem Prize (joint with Oded Schramm, 2001), the Göran Gustafsson Prize (2001), the Rollo Davidson Prize (2002), and the Prize of the European Mathematical Society (2004). In 2010 Smirnov was awarded the Fields Medal for his work on the mathematical foundations of statistical physics, particularly finite lattice models. His citation reads "for the proof of conformal invariance of percolation and the planar Ising model in statistical physics".

== Publications ==
- Probability and Statistical Physics in St. Petersburg, American Math Society, (2015)
